= UNIS-UN Conference =

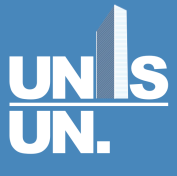
- Formation: 1976
- Type: Student Conference
- Legal status: Active
- Advisors: Zakaria Baha, Michelle Fredj-Bertrand, Alcy Leyva
- Parent organization: United Nations International School
- Website: https://www.unis.org/unis-un
- First Conference - 3–4 March 1977; Last Conference - 17–19 March 2025

The UNIS-UN Conference is organized and run by high school students from the United Nations International School (UNIS). It aims to foster an environment in which young adults can grow their worldview and expand their horizons, whilst learning about and discussing important, influential issues in our world today. By inviting a variety of different schools from around the world, with different outlooks and cultures, it creates an atmosphere in which students can learn and form opinions in a globalized setting and ultimately become better, well-rounded world citizens. An integral part of the UNIS-UN experience was the hosting of visiting students by UNIS families to help foster friendships and promote cross-cultural exchange.

The conference is held annually in the General Assembly Hall of the United Nations Headquarters. The use of the General Assembly Hall by the UNIS-UN Conference is a strong representation of the tie between the United Nations International School and the United Nations. The conference is targeted towards the international high-school students that make up the majority of its audience. Attending schools must be invited and attendees must be affiliated with a school.

The 2006 UNIS-UN Conference UN General Assembly Hall

Each year, a new topic of interest and importance is chosen for the conference. The UNIS-UN Conference is designed to provide students with expert knowledge imparted by provocative guest speakers. The conference also endeavors to give visiting students a platform to express their own opinions and views during the debate segment, introduced in 2006. The conference has gained much fame over the years, and is commonly the first thing associated with the United Nations International School. More than seven hundred students hailing from six continents attend the conference. Approximately 400 of the attending students are enrolled at UNIS. An additional 300 - 400 more students are invited from international schools around the world.

Secretary General Kofi Annan and President of the General Assembly Jan Eliasson at the 2006 UNIS-UN Conference

== History ==
UNIS-UN was founded in 1976 by several UNIS students in collaboration with a Tutorial House (UNIS equivalent of high school) humanities teacher. The conference was first held on March 3 and 4, 1977, in the General Assembly Hall of the United Nations Headquarters, and became a tradition every year since then. In 2011, the Cultural Showcase was introduced, featuring international performances at UNIS by visiting schools the day before the conference. Due to the COVID-19 pandemic, the 2020 conference was cancelled along with the tradition of hosting visiting schools. The organizing committee has grown over the years (to its current number of approximately seventy).

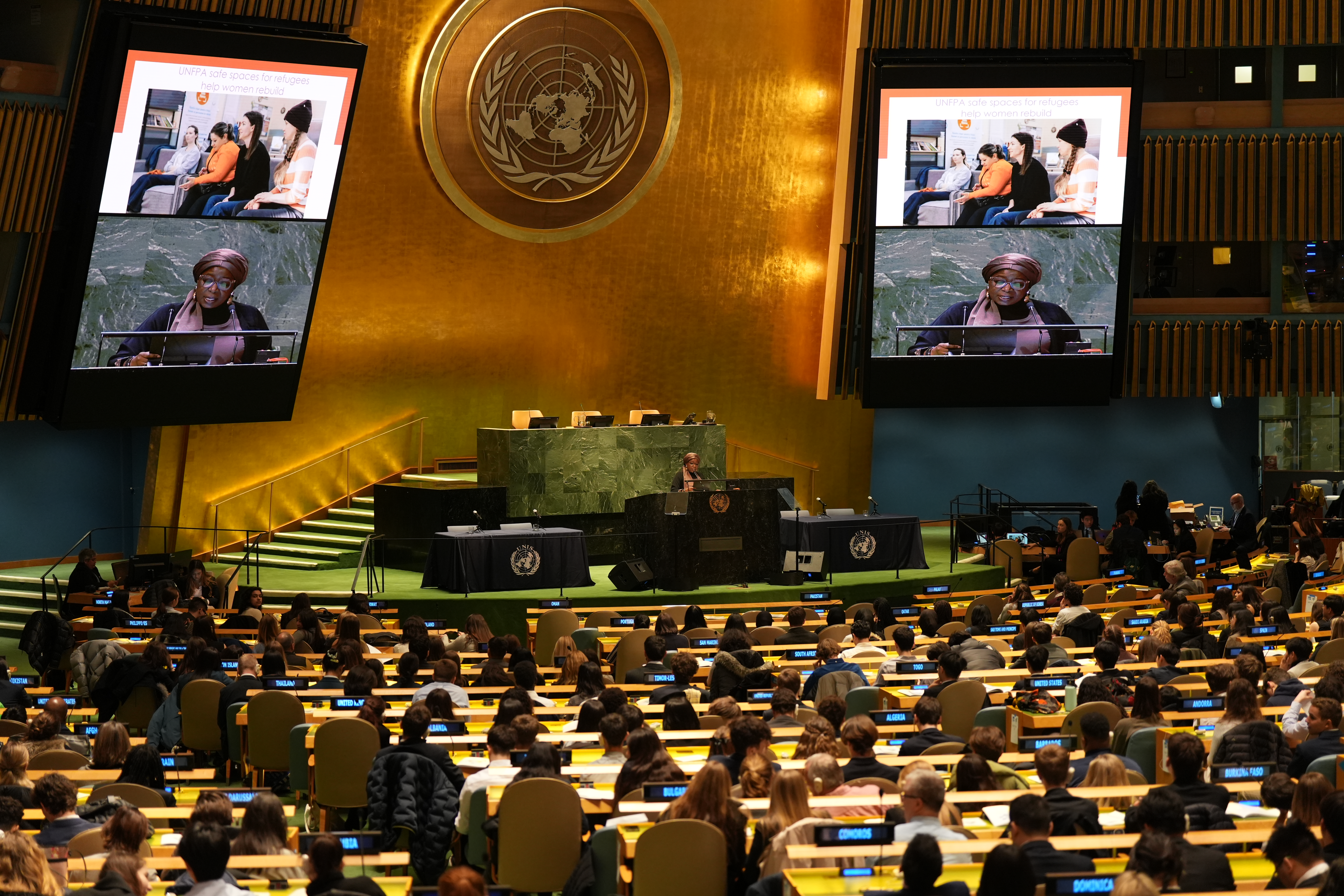
Students attend the 2024 UNIS-UN Conference. The speaker on the podium is Diene Keita.

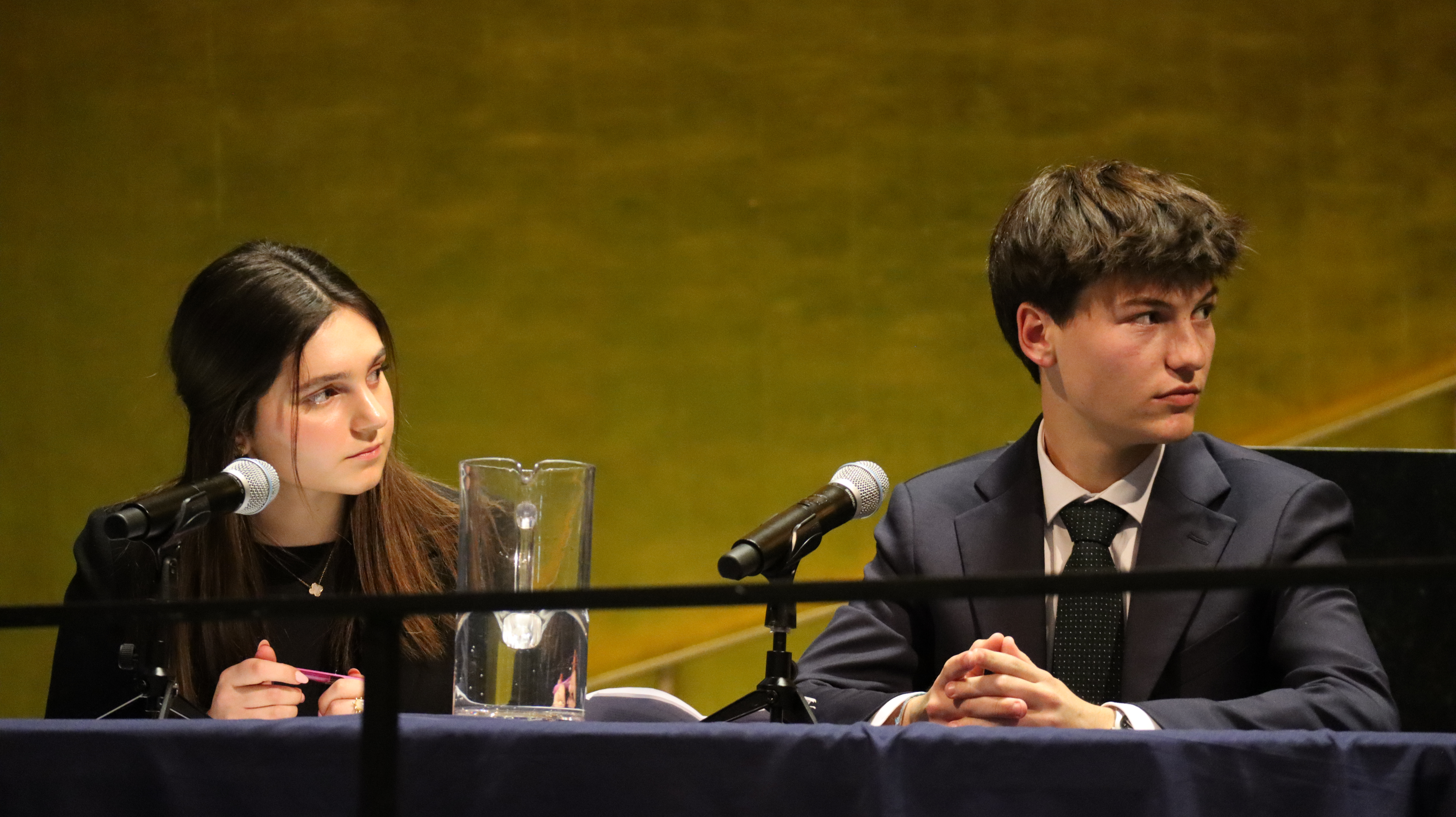
Students debating during the 2024 UNIS-UN Conference

== Organization ==
The UNIS-UN Organizing Committee is split up into several committees (Visiting Schools, Finance, Tech, Logistics, Editing, and Speakers) to ease the organization process. Visiting Schools is in charge of organizing the students visiting from abroad. Finance manages the budget and buys merchandise for the attendees to purchase. Technology organizes any technological components, like presentations for the speakers and liaising with UN staff. Logistics organizes the Day of Cultural Exchange, which includes workshops, the Cultural Showcase, and a welcome dinner the day before the conference. Editing edits the articles for the Working Paper, and Speakers finds people to speak at the conference and organizes the debates. Each committee is headed by one or two students (usually juniors and seniors). These committee heads make up the UNIS-UN Executive Committee (ExComm); however, there are a select few students who are not the heads of the commissions but are prominent members of the committees.

Preparations for the conference are begun nearly a year in advance and include finding and researching a topic of global relevance, drawing up a list of speakers, inviting several hundred students from schools all over the world, and compiling a Working Paper of articles pertaining to the topic written and edited by members of the UNIS-UN Editing ExComm. The conference is broadcast live on UN Web TV.

== Past conferences ==
Previous UNIS-UN speakers and panelists include:

- Kofi Annan (Former Secretary-General of the UN)
- Jan Eliasson (Former President of the General Assembly of the UN)
- Danny Glover
- Harry Belafonte
- Vanessa Redgrave
- Morgan Spurlock
- Hillary Clinton (Former First Lady of the United States)
- Maria Luiza Ribeiro Viotti (Former Permanent Representative of Brazil to the United Nations)

Previous topics include:

Previous UNIS-UN Conferences
Year	Conference Topic	ExComm Co-chairs	Speakers and Panelists
2024	Equal Rights Equal Heights: Climbing the Ladder of Gender Equality	Justa van Gaal and Aaliya Malholta	Diene Keita
2024	Equal Rights Equal Heights: Climbing the Ladder of Gender Equality	Justa van Gaal and Aaliya Malholta	Navina Haidar Haykel
2024	Equal Rights Equal Heights: Climbing the Ladder of Gender Equality	Justa van Gaal and Aaliya Malholta	Mariam Vahradyan
2024	Equal Rights Equal Heights: Climbing the Ladder of Gender Equality	Justa van Gaal and Aaliya Malholta	Caryl Stern
2024	Equal Rights Equal Heights: Climbing the Ladder of Gender Equality	Justa van Gaal and Aaliya Malholta	Anna Karin Eneström (Permanent Representative of Sweden to the United Nations)
2024	Equal Rights Equal Heights: Climbing the Ladder of Gender Equality	Justa van Gaal and Aaliya Malholta	Jörundur Valtýsson (Permanent Representative of Iceland to the United Nations)
2024	Equal Rights Equal Heights: Climbing the Ladder of Gender Equality	Justa van Gaal and Aaliya Malholta	Vanessa Frazier (Permanent Representative of Malta to the United Nations)
2024	Equal Rights Equal Heights: Climbing the Ladder of Gender Equality	Justa van Gaal and Aaliya Malholta	Felipe Paullier (Assistant Secretary-General for Youth Affairs at the United Nations)
2023	Turning the Page: A New Chapter in Education	Sophie Chen and Antonio Athias	Christopher de Bono
2023	Turning the Page: A New Chapter in Education	Sophie Chen and Antonio Athias	Roser Salavert
2023	Turning the Page: A New Chapter in Education	Sophie Chen and Antonio Athias	Ana Paula Zakarias
2023	Turning the Page: A New Chapter in Education	Sophie Chen and Antonio Athias	Juan Ramón de la Fuente
2023	Turning the Page: A New Chapter in Education	Sophie Chen and Antonio Athias	Robert Keith Rae
2023	Turning the Page: A New Chapter in Education	Sophie Chen and Antonio Athias	Sheikha Alya Ahmed Bin Saif Al-Thani
2023	Turning the Page: A New Chapter in Education	Sophie Chen and Antonio Athias	Sheikh Manssour Bin Mussallam
2023	Turning the Page: A New Chapter in Education	Sophie Chen and Antonio Athias	Lauren Rumble
2023	Turning the Page: A New Chapter in Education	Sophie Chen and Antonio Athias	Soraya Fouladi
2022	Food for Thought: A Sustainable Approach to Food Security	Eva Lifsec and Jack Hochman	Seth Goldman
2022	Food for Thought: A Sustainable Approach to Food Security	Eva Lifsec and Jack Hochman	Abby Maxman
2022	Food for Thought: A Sustainable Approach to Food Security	Eva Lifsec and Jack Hochman	Mary-Ellen McGroarty
2022	Food for Thought: A Sustainable Approach to Food Security	Eva Lifsec and Jack Hochman	Susan Bratton
2022	Food for Thought: A Sustainable Approach to Food Security	Eva Lifsec and Jack Hochman	Rebekah Hodge
2022	Food for Thought: A Sustainable Approach to Food Security	Eva Lifsec and Jack Hochman	Esther Penunia
2022	Food for Thought: A Sustainable Approach to Food Security	Eva Lifsec and Jack Hochman	Mai Thin Yu Mon
2022	Food for Thought: A Sustainable Approach to Food Security	Eva Lifsec and Jack Hochman	Oscar Ekponimo
2022	Food for Thought: A Sustainable Approach to Food Security	Eva Lifsec and Jack Hochman	Eli Goldman
2021	A Global Catastrophe: The Impacts of COVID-19	Eva Lifsec and Jack Hochman	Anthony Fauci
2021	A Global Catastrophe: The Impacts of COVID-19	Eva Lifsec and Jack Hochman	Michael S. Phillips
2021	A Global Catastrophe: The Impacts of COVID-19	Eva Lifsec and Jack Hochman	Christiane Amanpour
2021	A Global Catastrophe: The Impacts of COVID-19	Eva Lifsec and Jack Hochman	Sanjay Gupta
2021	A Global Catastrophe: The Impacts of COVID-19	Eva Lifsec and Jack Hochman	Burhan Gafoor
2020	Megacities: A Sustainable Future	Sophia Duff and Tom Mckillop	
2019	Ripple Effect: The Water Crisis	Noëlla Kalasa and Sophia Duff	Galila Gray
2019	Ripple Effect: The Water Crisis	Noëlla Kalasa and Sophia Duff	Andrew Hudson
2019	Ripple Effect: The Water Crisis	Noëlla Kalasa and Sophia Duff	Seth M. Siegel
2019	Ripple Effect: The Water Crisis	Noëlla Kalasa and Sophia Duff	Wolfram Schlenker
2019	Ripple Effect: The Water Crisis	Noëlla Kalasa and Sophia Duff	Zaria Forman
2019	Ripple Effect: The Water Crisis	Noëlla Kalasa and Sophia Duff	Fiona Ward
2018	Under CTRL: Technology, Innovation and the Future of Work	Ayesha Wijesekera and Noëlla Kalasa	Maha Aziz
2018	Under CTRL: Technology, Innovation and the Future of Work	Ayesha Wijesekera and Noëlla Kalasa	Andrew Brust
2018	Under CTRL: Technology, Innovation and the Future of Work	Ayesha Wijesekera and Noëlla Kalasa	Michael Scissons
2018	Under CTRL: Technology, Innovation and the Future of Work	Ayesha Wijesekera and Noëlla Kalasa	Federico Rampini
2018	Under CTRL: Technology, Innovation and the Future of Work	Ayesha Wijesekera and Noëlla Kalasa	Tsvi Gal
2018	Under CTRL: Technology, Innovation and the Future of Work	Ayesha Wijesekera and Noëlla Kalasa	Clay Shirky
2017	Migration: Crossing the Line	Sarah Blau and Sean Waxman-Lenz	William Milberg
2017	Migration: Crossing the Line	Sarah Blau and Sean Waxman-Lenz	Angy Rivera
2017	Migration: Crossing the Line	Sarah Blau and Sean Waxman-Lenz	Sirin Selcuk
2017	Migration: Crossing the Line	Sarah Blau and Sean Waxman-Lenz	Gregory Maniatis
2017	Migration: Crossing the Line	Sarah Blau and Sean Waxman-Lenz	Ben Fox Rubin
2017	Migration: Crossing the Line	Sarah Blau and Sean Waxman-Lenz	Victor Flores
2016	Media’s Influence: Opinions, Activism, & Outcomes		Suroosh Alvi
2016	Media’s Influence: Opinions, Activism, & Outcomes		Buzz Bissinger
2016	Media’s Influence: Opinions, Activism, & Outcomes		Susan Chira
2016	Media’s Influence: Opinions, Activism, & Outcomes		Casey Neistat
2016	Media’s Influence: Opinions, Activism, & Outcomes		Paloma Escudero
2016	Media’s Influence: Opinions, Activism, & Outcomes		Trevor Johnson
2015	Sustainability: Balancing People, Planet, & Profit		Amina J. Mohammed
2015	Sustainability: Balancing People, Planet, & Profit		Estela Vazquez
2015	Sustainability: Balancing People, Planet, & Profit		Georg Kell
2015	Sustainability: Balancing People, Planet, & Profit		Hans Rosling
2015	Sustainability: Balancing People, Planet, & Profit		Jennifer Siebel Newsom
2015	Sustainability: Balancing People, Planet, & Profit		Joel K. Bourne
2014	Globalization: A World of Exchange		
2013	Modern Youthquake: A Generation’s Impact		Ban Ki-moon
2013	Modern Youthquake: A Generation’s Impact		Corinne Woods
2013	Modern Youthquake: A Generation’s Impact		Sheena Matheiken
2013	Modern Youthquake: A Generation’s Impact		Claudia López
2013	Modern Youthquake: A Generation’s Impact		Brandon Stanton
2013	Modern Youthquake: A Generation’s Impact		Kiran Bir Sethi
2013	Modern Youthquake: A Generation’s Impact		Chris Temple
2013	Modern Youthquake: A Generation’s Impact		Zach Ingrasci
2012	Human Exploitation: Exposing the Unseen		Daniel F. Persico
2012	Human Exploitation: Exposing the Unseen		Katherine Chon
2012	Human Exploitation: Exposing the Unseen		Johanna M. Esposito
2012	Human Exploitation: Exposing the Unseen		Radhika Coomaraswamy
2012	Human Exploitation: Exposing the Unseen		Asha-Rose Migiro
2012	Human Exploitation: Exposing the Unseen		Kenneth D. Johnson
2012	Human Exploitation: Exposing the Unseen		Rachel Lloyd
2012	Human Exploitation: Exposing the Unseen		Lynn Stratford
2012	Human Exploitation: Exposing the Unseen		Helen Benedict
2011	The Web: Wiring our World		Nicholas Negroponte
2011	The Web: Wiring our World		Kamran Elahian
2011	The Web: Wiring our World		Judith Donath
2011	The Web: Wiring our World		Burt Herman
2011	The Web: Wiring our World		Clay Shirky
2011	The Web: Wiring our World		Jon Lawhead
2011	The Web: Wiring our World		Marc Rotenberg
2011	The Web: Wiring our World		Alexis Ohanian
2010	Bioethics: Striking a Balance		Christine Mitchell
2010	Bioethics: Striking a Balance		Kenneth Prager
2010	Bioethics: Striking a Balance		Ana Lita
2010	Bioethics: Striking a Balance		David Magnus
2010	Bioethics: Striking a Balance		Joseph Fins
2010	Bioethics: Striking a Balance		Wesley Smith
2009	The Food Crisis: A Global Challenge		Ban Ki-moon
2009	The Food Crisis: A Global Challenge		Daniel Gustafson
2009	The Food Crisis: A Global Challenge		J.W. Smith
2009	The Food Crisis: A Global Challenge		Caryl Stern
2009	The Food Crisis: A Global Challenge		A. G. Kawamura
2009	The Food Crisis: A Global Challenge		Henk-Jan Brinkman
2008	The Pursuit of Energy: A Catalyst To Conflict		Carlos Alejaldre
2008	The Pursuit of Energy: A Catalyst To Conflict		Mark Crandall
2008	The Pursuit of Energy: A Catalyst To Conflict		Lucas McConnell
2007	Global Warming: Confronting the Crisis		
2006	30 Years of UNIS-UN: The Role of the Corporation in Today's World		
2005	Global Health: Rights and Responsibilities in the 21st Century		
2004	Modern Mass Media: The Influence of Information		
2003	Youth at Risk: The Future in Our Hands		
2002	Prejudice: How Racism and Bigotry Scar Our World		
2001	Twenty-five years of the UNIS-UN: Problems and Progress over the Past Quarter Century		
2000	A Changing World: Examining Global Interdependence and Inequalities		
1999	Facing the New Millennium: a Search for Global Ethics		
1998	Civil Conflicts: Global Consequences and Concerns		
1997	Technology and Communications in the 21st Century: the Impact on Society		
1996	Children of the World: Struggles of a Generation		
1995	Women in Society: a Natural Balance, an Unequal World		
1994	International Responsibility: Power and Politics		
1993	Ethnic Struggles: Identity and Survival		
1992	Environment and Development: a Common Ground		
1991	A New World Order: the Opportunity for Change		
1990	Education for Survival		
1989	Human Rights		
1988	The Environment: a Global Crisis - the Need for Change		
1987	The Cost of War - The Price of Peace		
1986	Men and Women: Tradition and Change		
1985	Rights and Responsibilities of Youth		
1984	The Communication Revolution: Freedom or Control		
1983	Disarmament		
1982	Population and Development		
1981	Food and Development		
1980	Energy, Development and the Environment		
1979	Development Strategies and the Needs of Children in Celebration of the International Year of the Child		
1978	The Law of the Sea		
1977	New International Economic Order		
