= Marian Young =

American developmental biologist

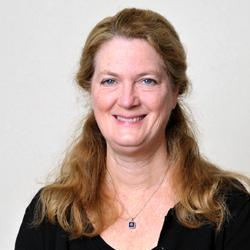
- Education: State University of New York at Oneonta; University of Connecticut
- Scientific career
- Fields: Developmental biology
- Workplaces: National Institute of Dental and Craniofacial Research
- Thesis: Serum Protein Synthesis in the Extraembryonic Endoderm of the Early Chick Embryo (1981)

Marian Frances Young is an American developmental biologist researching the function of extracellular matrix proteins in skeletal tissues. She is the deputy scientific director of the division of intramural research at the National Institute of Dental and Craniofacial Research.

== Education ==
Young completed a bachelor's degree at State University of New York at Oneonta. She earned a Ph.D. in developmental biology from the University of Connecticut in the department of genetics and cell biology. Her 1981 dissertation was titled, Serum Protein Synthesis in the Extraembryonic Endoderm of the Early Chick Embryo. In 1981, Young came to the National Institute of Dental and Craniofacial Research (NIDCR) as a postdoctoral fellow to work with George Martin, the chief of the lab of craniofacial and developmental anomalies (LDBA) branch. Her postdoctoral work in the LDBA ranch from 1981 to 1983 investigated the structure, function, and regulation of matrix genes made by cartilage tissue.

== Career ==
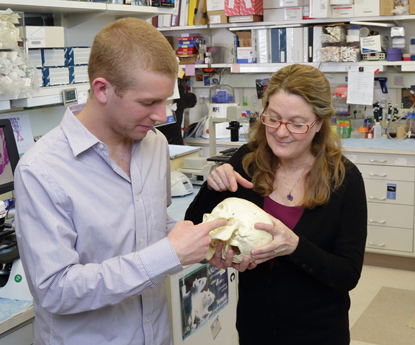
Postbaccalaureate researcher Andrew Donald (left) and Young (right) examining the temporomandibular joint in a plastic replica of the craniofacial bones in a human skull in 2012

Young became staff fellow/tenure-track investigator in 1983 in the mineralized tissue branch (MTB) led by John Termine. There, she began investigations on the molecular biology and function of extracellular matrix (ECM) proteins in skeletal tissues. In 1990, Young became a tenured senior investigator of the molecular biology of bones and teeth section in the MTB which subsequently became the craniofacial and skeletal diseases branch led by Pamela Robey.

Young has organized symposia and scientific conferences on the topic of bones and teeth, mineralization, and the ECM including the Gordon Research Conference (GRC) on Bones and Teeth (1997), a symposium on the ECM in the Craniofacial Complex, AADR (2004) and the GRC on Proteoglycans (2010). Young has served on numerous committees at the NIH related to promotion and tenure action, oversight of animal facilities, and coordination of summer student research. She has supervised dozens of research fellows and students.

As of 2018, Young was a senior investigator and chief of the molecular biology of bones and teeth section. In August 2018, she was appointed deputy scientific director of the NIDCR division of intramural research.

=== Research ===
Marian Young’s research section explores the function of ECM proteins found in skeletal tissues. The focus is on the small leucine-rich proteoglycans (SLRPs) biglycan (bgn), decorin (dcn), and fibromodulin (fmod), and the Wnt target gene known as WISP1. Young’s research explores how these ECM components control skeletal tissue function via both anabolic (through differentiation and formation) and catabolic (breakdown or resorption) mechanisms which, in some cases, work by modulating growth factor availability. The group also investigates how stem cell fate can be regulated by the ECM in multiple skeletal sites including bones, teeth, cartilage, and tendon. The ultimate purpose of the research is to develop practical applications for these ECM components in ameliorating diseases such as osteopenia, osteoarthritis, and ectopic bone formation in soft tissues.

== Awards ==
Young received an honorary doctorate from her undergraduate alma mater State University of New York (SUNY) at Oneonta in 1998. In 2012, she was awarded the NIH Directors Award for Mentorship. In 2014, Young received a Ruth L. Kirschstein Mentoring award. In 2018, Young received the Stephen M. Krane Award from the American Society for Bone and Mineral Research in recognition of outstanding achievements in basic, translational, or clinical research in inflammation and/or skeletal matrix biology.
