= Coffel =

Coffel is a surname. Notable people with the surname include:

- Erin Coffel (born 2002), American softball player
- Scott Coffel (born 1956), American poet
