= Royal F. Netzer =

Academic administrator

4th President of the State University of New York at Oneonta
- In office 1951–1970
- Preceded by: Charles W. Hunt
- Succeeded by: Clifford J. Craven

Personal details
- Born: Royal Franklin Netzer; 1907
- Died: 1986 (aged 78-79)

Royal Franklin Netzer was an academic administrator who served as the 4th President of the State University of New York at Oneonta from 1951 to 1970.

Prior to becoming the head of SUNY Oneonta, Netzer was a dean at the school now known as SUNY Geneseo from 1939 until he was appointed the president of SUNY Oneonta in 1951. He was selected to serve in the position following Charles W. Hunt reaching the age of 70, which triggered his mandatory retirement. Netzer assumed his position on February 1, 1951. He retired in 1970, and was succeeded by Clifford Craven.

The Royal F. Netzer Endowment is named for him.
