= George W. Thompson =

George W. Thompson may refer to:

- George W. Thompson (politician) (1806–1888), Virginia politician and lawyer
- George W. Thompson (Medal of Honor) (1847–?), American soldier and recipient of the Medal of Honor
- George William Thompson (born 1956), American international trade attorney and adjunct professor
