= Ian McMillan =

Ian McMillan may refer to:

- Ian MacMillan (author) (1941–2008), Hawaiian scholar and novelist
- Ian McMillan (curler) (born 1991), Canadian curler
- Ian McMillan (footballer) (1931–2024), Scottish footballer
- Ian McMillan (poet) (born 1956), English poet, journalist, playwright, and broadcaster
- Iain Macmillan (1938–2006), Scottish photographer
