= Antonio Pérez (educator) =

Puerto Rican educator

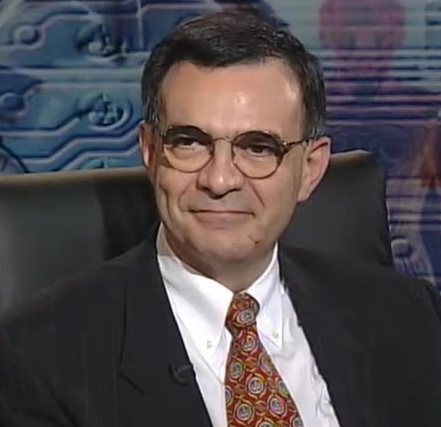
- Pérez on CUNY TV's Education Forum, 1999
- Born: December 29, 1946 (age 79); Aguada, Puerto Rico
- Education: State University of New York, Oneonta (BA); State University of New York, Albany (MA, EdD)

Antonio Pérez López was appointed in 1995 as president of Borough of Manhattan Community College (BMCC), The City University of New York (CUNY) which has grown since that time to have the highest enrollment of any CUNY college. President Pérez stepped down in 2018.

President Pérez has led the development of programs that increase the participation of women and low-income students in the STEM (Science, Technology, Engineering and Math) fields, as well as programs that prepare students to enter high-demand fields, including nursing and allied health.

He is also widely known for having shepherded the college community through the aftermath of the events of September 11, 2001. BMCC is the only college in United States history to have lost a campus building to a terrorist attack. Fiterman Hall, a few blocks from BMCC's main campus, was destroyed when World Trade 7, across the street, collapsed and fell against it, causing irreparable damage. Fiterman Hall was closed and BMCC’s main campus building became a command center and staging area for about 2,000 rescue workers. Pérez, broadcasting live with CBS 2 reporter Lou Young on the roof of the BMCC main campus building, got the word out to the college’s then 16,000 students that BMCC would reopen on October 1, less than three weeks after the attacks.

After 9/11, Pérez spent more than 10 years involved in efforts to procure funding to raze and rebuild Fiterman Hall. He was closely involved in developing a public/private partnership between the Dormitory Authority of the State of New York, the Office of NYC Mayor Michael Bloomberg, The City University of New York, the U.S. Environmental Protection Agency, the NYS Department of Labor, the NYC Department of Transportation and others.

That partnership resulted in the opening of a new Fiterman Hall in August 2012. Pérez has spoken and written widely on leadership during a crisis and other issues affecting community college students since that time, and discusses leading BMCC through the post-9/11 years in a January 2014 interview with TV station WPIX-NY (Pix11)

== Early life and education ==
Antonio Pérez was born on December 29, 1946, in Aguada, Puerto Rico, and raised in Harlem, New York City. His mother, Delia Lopez-Mejia, is an Aguada native, and his father, Antonio Pérez-Moreno, was born in Rincón, Puerto Rico. Pérez earned a Bachelor of Arts in Secondary Education/Social Science degree from the State University of New York (SUNY) Oneonta in 1968 and a doctoral degree in education (Ed.D.) from SUNY Albany in 1974.

== Career ==
The BMCC student body grew from over 16,300 in 1995, when Pérez came on board, to over 25,000 in Spring 2015, and the number of degree programs the college offers grew from 20 to 33 in that time. In Spring 2018, he retired from being president.

According to Community College Week’s Top 100 Associate Degree and Certificate Producers 2014, BMCC ranks #4 among community colleges nationwide in granting associate degrees to minority students; #4 among community colleges nationwide in granting associate degrees to African American students and #10 among community colleges nationwide in granting associate degrees to Hispanic students.

When speaking to groups of BMCC students, Pérez often refers to his own experience of growing up in an immigrant household with limited income, and experiencing academic challenges. Responding to criticism about community college graduation rates from former New York City Mayor Rudolph Giuliani, Pérez founded the BMCC Out in Two program, which provides scholarships and academic support enabling students to graduate in two years. Pérez led the creation of a partnership between BMCC and SUNY Empire State College, so that BMCC graduates have a pathway to earn a bachelor's degree in an accredited distance-learning program, and he facilitated BMCC's role in the creation of the NYSIM (CUNY/NYU Langone Medical Center), which serves as a training site for BMCC allied health students, as well as for college students across New York City.

== Community service ==
Advisory Board Member, The 2015 Americas Film Festival of New York• Advisory Board Member, Lower Manhattan Development Corporation • Board Member, Downtown Alliance • Board Member, Greater Harlem Chamber of Commerce • Board Member, Lower Manhattan Cultural Council • Board Member, National Jazz Museum in Harlem • Board Member, National Museum of the American Indian • Board Member, New York Simulation Center for Health Services • Vice President, Hispanic Initiatives, Greater New York Councils of Boy Scouts of America •• Former Chair, The City University of New York Nursing Task Force • Member, Memorial Mission Statement Drafting Committee, World Trade Center Site Memorial Competition, Lower Manhattan Development Corporation, 2004 • Member, Presidents for Latino Student Success, Excelencia in Education • Member, Council of Presidential Advisors, One To World, Creating Global Citizens, Inspiring a Peaceful World • Secretary, Hispanic Association of Colleges and Universities •• Vice President, Board of Directors, Hispanic Educational Telecommunications System (2003) • National Advisory Board Member, National Community College Hispanic Council • Board Officer, Hispanic Association of Colleges and Universities • Emeritus Board Member, The Northeast Region of The National Council on Black American Affairs • Speaker, Keeping the Promise: Partnerships for Latino Education Success, Congressional Hispanic Caucus Institute, Inc., 2012

== Awards ==
• Honorary Doctorate in Humane Letters, State University of New York, Oneonta (1997) • Chair’s Award for Contributions to Global Education, City College Birmingham, England (2003) • Annual Latino Heritage and Culture Award Winner (2008) • Top 100 Minority Business Leader, Crain’s New York Business (2003) • Golden Age Honoree in Community Leadership, Latino Center on Aging, 22nd Golden Age Awards Annual Banquet (2014) • Pacesetter of the Year, National Council for Marketing and Public Relations (2001) • Public Service Award, Salvador Center (2014) • Lifetime Achievement Award, New York League of Puerto Rican Women, Inc. (2012) • Member CEO, RC-2020, Inc., Enhancing Leadership and Expanding Visions for Urban Community Colleges
