= United Nations Population Fund =

United Nations organization

- Abbreviation: UNFPA
- Formation: 1969
- Legal status: Active
- Headquarters: New York City, United States
- Head: Diene Keita
- Employees: 3111 (2022)
- Website: www.unfpa.org

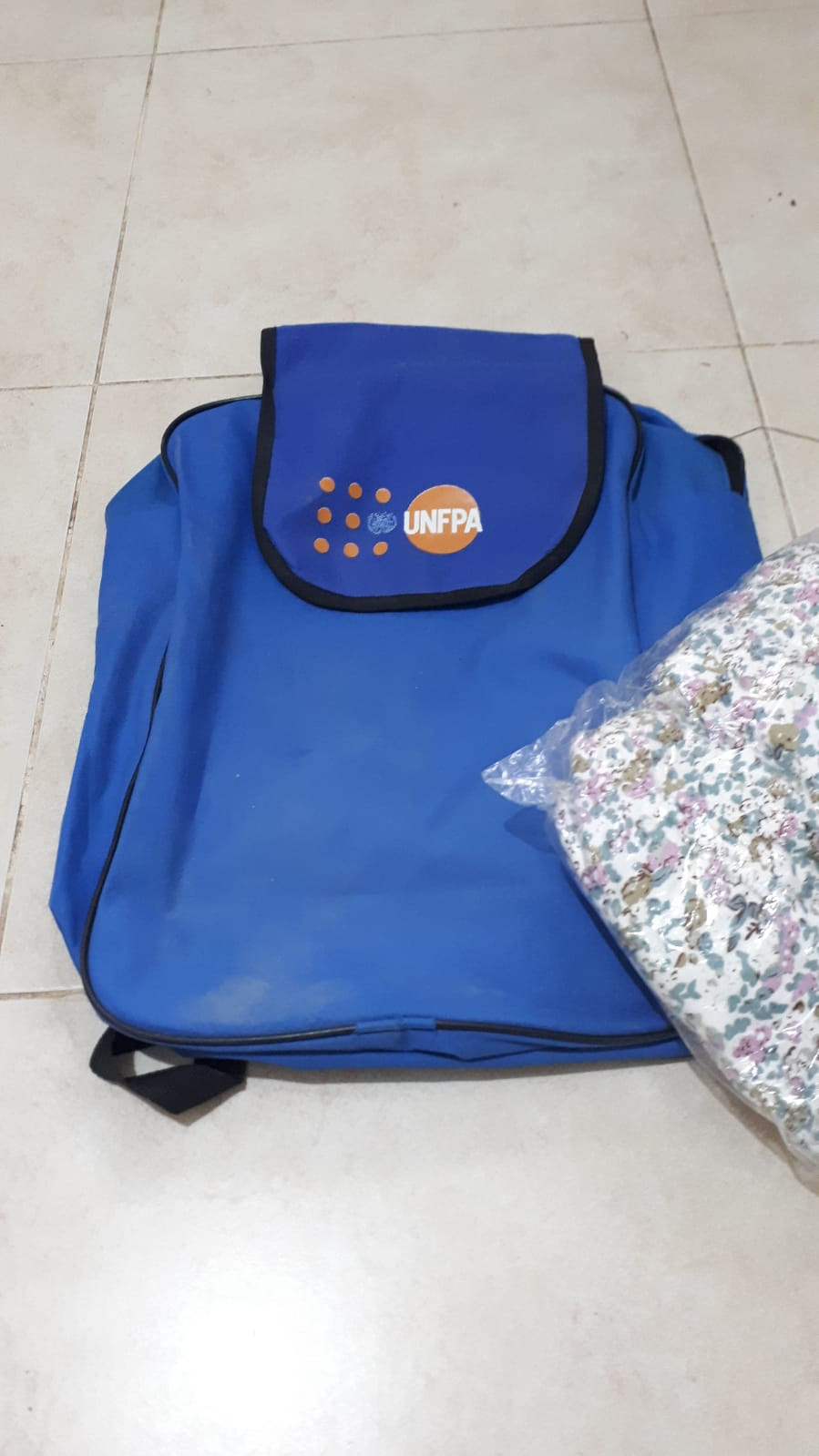
A case like this was transferred through the humanitarian corridor in Gaza in 2024. The bag contained a galabia, sunscreen, soap and flip-flops. The UNFPA logo is printed on the case.

The United Nations Population Fund (UNFPA) is a UN agency aimed at improving reproductive and maternal health worldwide. Its work includes developing national healthcare strategies and protocols, increasing access to birth control, and leading campaigns against child marriage, gender-based violence, obstetric fistula, and female genital mutilation.

The UNFPA supports programs in more than 144 countries across four geographic regions: Arab States and Europe, Asia and the Pacific, Latin America, the Caribbean and Africa. Around three-quarters of the staff work in the field. It is a founding member of the United Nations Development Group, a collection of UN agencies and programmes focused on fulfilling the Sustainable Development Goals.

== Origins ==
In December 1966, 12 heads of state made a declaration urging the United Nations to work on population issues. The Secretary-General created a trust fund for population in 1967. The agency began operations in 1969 as the United Nations Fund for Population Activities under the administration of the United Nations Development Fund. In 1971 it was placed under the authority of the United Nations General Assembly. Its name was changed into United Nations Population Fund in 1987. However, the shortened term of UNFPA has been retained.

== UNFPA: Strategic outlook ==
=== Sustainable Development Goals ===
In September 2015, the 193 member states of the United Nations unanimously adopted the Sustainable Development Goals, a set of 17 goals aiming to transform the world over the next 15 years. These goals are designed to eliminate poverty, discrimination, abuse and preventable deaths, address environmental destruction, and usher in an era of development for all people, everywhere.

UNFPA stated the Sustainable Development Goals are ambitious, and they will require enormous efforts across countries, continents, industries and disciplines, but they are achievable. UNFPA works with governments, partners and other UN agencies to directly tackle many of these goals – in particular Goal 3 on health, Goal 4 on education and Goal 5 on gender equality – and contributes in a variety of ways to achieving many of the other goals.

=== Warning on declining fertility ===
In June 2025, UNFPA issued a report, based on a survey of 14,000 people in 14 countries, warning of a decline in fertility. "The world has begun an unprecedented decline in fertility rates," said Dr Natalia Kanem, head of UNFPA. The causes of people having less children than they wanted included the high cost of child care.

Countries surveyed included the US, Sweden, Brazil, India, Indonesia, Morocco, South Africa, and Nigeria, a mix of low-, middle- and high-income countries, which amounted to a third of the global population. Professor Stuart Gietel-Basten, demographer at the Hong Kong University of Science and Technology, said "This is the first time that [the UN] have really gone all-out on low fertility issues."

== Leadership ==
The UNFPA is a subsidiary organ of the UN General Assembly and also receives policy guidance from the UN Economic and Social Council. It is headed by an Executive Director, and governed by an executive board which it shares with UNDP and UNOPS.

List of Executive Directors:

	Executive Director	Country	Period
1	Rafael M. Salas	Philippines	1969–1987
2	Nafis Sadik	Pakistan	1987–2000
3	Thoraya Ahmed Obaid	Saudi Arabia	2001–2010
4	Babatunde Osotimehin	Nigeria	2011–2017
5	Natalia Kanem	Panama	2017–2025
6	Diene Keita	Guinea	2025–present

== Areas of work ==
UNFPA is the world's largest multilateral source of funding for population and reproductive health programs. The Fund works with governments and non-governmental organizations in over 150 countries with the support of the international community, supporting programs that help women, men and young people:

- voluntarily plan and have the number of children they desire and to avoid unwanted pregnancies
- undergo safe pregnancy and childbirth
- avoid spreading sexually transmitted infections
- decrease violence against women
- increase the equality of women
- encouraging the use of birth control

UNFPA uses a human rights-based approach in programming to address three "transformative goals":

1. Zero preventable maternal death
2. Zero gender-based violence
3. Zero unmet need for family planning.

The Fund raises awareness of and supports efforts to meet these goals, advocates close attention to population concerns and helps nations formulate policies and strategies in support of sustainable development. Osotimehin assumed leadership in January 2011. The Fund is also represented by UNFPA Goodwill Ambassadors and a Patron.

=== How it works ===
UNFPA works in partnership with governments, along with other United Nations agencies, communities, NGOs, foundations and the private sector, to raise awareness and mobilize the support and resources needed to achieve its mission to promote the rights and health of women and young people. For instance, it is one of the co-sponsors of the Special Programme on Human Reproduction.

Contributions from governments and the private sector to UNFPA in 2016 totaled $848 million. The amount includes $353 million for the organization's core resources and $495 million earmarked for specific programs and initiatives. As a result of the economic impact of coronavirus pandemic, the United Kingdom imposed 85% aid cut to UNFPA.

Examples of campaigns:

=== Campaign to end fistula ===
- This UNFPA-led global campaign works to prevent obstetric fistula, a devastating and socially isolating injury of childbirth, to treat women who live with the condition and help those who have been treated to return to their communities. The campaign works in more than 40 countries in Africa, the Arab States and South Asia.
- The leader of the campaign to end fistula, Erin Anastasi, decided to start this campaign in 2003 in hopes of ending the deaths of new mothers after developing fistula. This campaign is now active in over 50 countries working not only to prevent fistula but also to give fistula survivors a sense of reforming their life after overcoming this burden. Nearly 800 women in Africa and Asia die after childbirth and more than 2 million young women live with untreated obstetric fistula in Asia and Sub-Saharan Africa. The campaign focuses mainly on providing training and funds to support women living with fistula, and also programs aimed towards survivors. The campaign is also looking at ways to prevent fistula from developing in general by providing medical supplies and technical guidance and support.

=== Ending female genital mutilation ===
- UNFPA has worked for many years to end the practice of female genital mutilation, the partial or total removal of external female genital organs for cultural or other non-medical reasons. The practice, which affects 100–140 million women and girls across the world, violates their right to health and bodily integrity. In 2007, UNFPA in partnership with UNICEF, launched a $44 million program to reduce the practice by 40 per cent in 16 countries by 2015 and to end it within a generation. UNFPA also recently sponsored a Global Technical Consultation, which drew experts from all over the world to discuss strategies to convince communities to abandon the practice. UNFPA supports the campaign to end female genital mutilation with The Guardian.

== Relations with the US government ==
UNFPA has been accused by American pro-life groups of providing support for government programs which have promoted forced abortions and coercive sterilizations. UNFPA says it "does not provide support for abortion services". Its charter includes a strong statement condemning coercion. In response to these allegations, the US Congress passed the Kemp-Kasten amendment in 1985 to empower the president to block US funding of programs deemed by the president to include "coercive abortion or involuntary sterilization". Since its passage, all Republican presidents (Reagan, H.W. Bush, W. Bush, and Trump) have withheld funding from the UNFPA – a policy known as the Mexico City Policy.

UNFPA provided aid to Peru's reproductive health program in the mid-to-late 1990s. When it was discovered a Peruvian program had been engaged in carrying out coercive sterilizations, UNFPA called for reforms and protocols to protect the rights of women seeking assistance. UNFPA continued work with the country after the abuses had become public to help end the abuses and reform laws and practices.

Over the course of the George W. Bush administration, a total of $244 million in Congressionally approved funding was blocked by the Executive Branch. From 2002 through 2008, the administration denied funding to UNFPA that had already been allocated by the US Congress, on the grounds that the UNFPA supported Chinese government programs which include forced abortions and coercive sterilizations. In a letter from the Under Secretary of State for Political Affairs Nicholas Burns to Congress, the administration said it had determined that UNFPA's support for China's population program "facilitates its government's coercive abortion program", thus violating the Kemp-Kasten Amendment, which bans the use of United States aid to finance organizations that support or take part in managing a program of coercive abortion or sterilization.

The notion that UNFPA had any connection to China's administration of forced abortions was deemed to be unsubstantiated by investigations carried out by various US, UK, and UN teams sent to examine UNFPA activities in China. Specifically, a three-person US State Department fact-finding team was sent on a two-week tour throughout China. It wrote in its report that it found "no evidence that UNFPA has supported or participated in the management of a program of coercive abortion or involuntary sterilization in China," as has been charged by critics.

However, according to then-Secretary of State Colin Powell, the UNFPA contributed vehicles and computers to the Chinese to carry out their population planning policies. However, both The Washington Post and The Washington Times reported that Powell simply fell in line, signing a brief written by someone else.

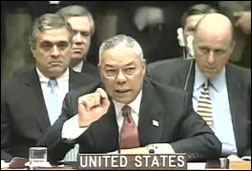
Colin Powell at the United Nations

US Representative Chris Smith criticized the State Department investigation, saying the investigators were shown "Potemkin Villages" where residents had been intimidated into lying about the family-planning program. Nafis Sadik, former director of UNFPA, said her agency had been pivotal in reversing China's coercive population planning methods, but a 2005 report by Amnesty International and a separate report by the US State Department found that coercive techniques were still regularly employed by the Chinese, casting doubt upon Sadik's statements. However, Amnesty International found no evidence that UNFPA had supported the coercion.

A 2001 study conducted by the pro-life Population Research Institute claimed that the UNFPA shared an office with the Chinese family planning officials who were carrying out forced abortions. "We located the family planning offices, and in that family planning office, we located the UNFPA office, and we confirmed from family planning officials there that there is no distinction between what the UNFPA does and what the Chinese Family Planning Office does," said Scott Weinberg, a spokesman for PRI. However, United Nations Members disagreed and approved UNFPA's new country programme in January 2006. The more than 130 members of the "Group of 77" developing countries in the United Nations expressed support for the UNFPA programmes. In addition, speaking for several European democracies – Norway, Denmark, Sweden, Finland, the Netherlands, France, Belgium, Switzerland and Germany – the United Kingdom stated, "UNFPA's activities in China, as in the rest of the world, are in strict conformity with the unanimously adopted Programme of Action of the ICPD" and plays "a key role in supporting our common endeavour, the promotion and protection of all human rights and fundamental freedoms".

In response, the EU decided to fill the gap left behind by the US under the Sandbæk Report. According to its Annual Report for 2008, the UNFPA received its funding mainly from European governments: Of the total income of $845.3 million, $118 million was donated by the Netherlands, $67 million by Sweden, $62 million by Norway, $54 million by Denmark, $53 million by the UK, $52 million by Spain, and $19 million by Luxembourg. The European Commission donated a further $36 million. The most important non-European donor state was Japan, which gave $36 million. The number of donors exceeded 180 in one year.

In the United States, nonprofit organizations like Friends of UNFPA, formerly Americans for UNFPA, worked to compensate for the loss of United States federal funding by raising private donations.

In January 2009 President Barack Obama restored US funding to UNFPA, saying in a public statement that he would "look forward to working with Congress to restore U.S. financial support for the U.N. Population Fund. By resuming funding to UNFPA, the U.S. will be joining 180 other donor nations working collaboratively to reduce poverty, improve the health of women and children, prevent HIV/AIDS and provide family planning assistance to women in 154 countries."

The United States said during the UNDP/UNFPA/UNOPS Executive Board meeting that considered the China programme in 2015:

During its recent visit, the U.S. delegation observed the positive impact of UNFPA's rights-based programming in China. We commend the Fund's adherence to demonstrating the advantages of a voluntary approach to family planning and were pleased to see – in support of its ICPD commitments – increased provider emphasis on patient rights.

In April 2017, the Trump administration announced that it will cut off funding to UNFPA, on the grounds that it "supports, or participates in the management of, a program of coercive abortion or involuntary sterilization." UNFPA refuted this claim, as all of its work promotes the human rights of individuals and couples to make their own decisions, free of coercion or discrimination.

On 7 January 2026, the second Trump administration announced that the United States would be formally withdrawing from UNFPA "as soon as possible".

== Other UN population agencies and entities ==
Entities with competencies about population in the United Nations:

- Commission on Population and Development
- United Nations Department of Economic and Social Affairs

== See also ==
- Reproductive Health Supplies Coalition
