= Brown v. City of Oneonta =

American legal case

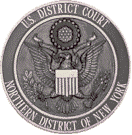
- Court: U.S. District Court for the Northern District of New York
- Full case name: Ricky Brown, et al., Plaintiffs, v. City of Oneonta, et al., Defendants.
- Decided: January 3, 1996

Case history
- Appealed to: United States Court of Appeals for the Second Circuit

Keywords
- Equal protection

Brown v. City of Oneonta was a case brought to the U.S District Court for the Northern District of New York in 1993 and later appealed to the United States Court of Appeals for the Second Circuit in 1999 that concerned the use of race in law enforcement investigations.

Residents of Oneonta, New York who were questioned in an effort by local law enforcement to question every Black resident of the town in a criminal investigation filed a class-action lawsuit against the city alleging that the action was unconstitutional. The court dismissed the claims holding that the police may question members of a specific minority group based on a witness' physical description.

The ruling has been criticized as upholding racial profiling in law enforcement.

== Background ==
In the morning of September 4, 1992, Oneonta police received a report that an individual with a knife broke into a private home within the city; a woman sleeping inside awoke and struggled with the intruder, who quickly fled the scene. The woman, in her report, admitted that while she had not seen the intruder's face, she had witnessed a dark-skinned forearm. She also allegedly reported that during her struggle with the intruder, they had cut their own hand. Police also reported she believed the intruder was young and male from the speed at which he moved.

== Investigation ==
A canine unit allegedly tracked the intruder's scent a few hundred yards away from the residence towards the State University of New York College at Oneonta. Suspecting the individual to be a student, the city police decided to question each African American male enrolled at the university. Using a list provided by the school, nicknamed "the black list", police approached Black students on and off campus, asking for each to provide an alibi and show their hands for possible cuts.

Finding no clear suspects, police chose to conduct a citywide sweep of Oneonta's African American residents. One police officer told reporters the purpose of the sweep was “to examine the hands of all the Black people in the community." During the sweep, police stopped cars occupied by Black individuals and prevented Black individuals from boarding busses unless they participated in physical examination and questioning. More than 300 individuals were questioned during the sweep, however no suspect was identified.

== Case ==
In 1993 individuals questioned during the sweep, including those on the list of Black university students provided to the police filed a class-action lawsuit in the United States District Court for the Northern District of New York against the City of Oneonta, State of New York, the university, and local police, including individual police officers. The plaintiffs asserted that law enforcement and the university had violated the Fourth Amendment and Equal Protection Clause of the U.S. Constitution, among a number of other local and federal anti-discrimination and privacy laws.

=== District court ===
The United States District Court for the Northern District of New York dismissed the plaintiffs equal protection claims, writing, that the clause is "essentially a direction that all persons similarly situated be treated alike" and that the plaintiffs had failed to identify a "similarly situated class of non-minorities" that had been treated differently

=== Appeal ===
The US Court of Appeals for the Second Circuit upheld law enforcement’s actions and dismissed the plaintiff's claims in 1999, ruling that use of race-based classification in identifying suspects in instances when use of such classification would prove efficient did not violate the constitution, although it may prove to have a "disparate impact on small minority groups." The ruling asserted the actions represented efficiency of policing over racial bias and such, in a "primarily black [community] with very few white residents and the search were for a young white male, the impact would be reversed."

== Discrepancies with records ==
In February 2002, CBS News obtained the police records from the 1992 investigation, which reportedly include a number of major discrepancies with information presented during the lawsuit. According to the records, the woman only describes a hand of dark complexion, entirely lacking any reference to a cut or description of the individual as young, key identifiers police reported during their sweep of the city. Additionally, the record shows that the police dog moved away from the university campus, contradicting information presented to the public by law enforcement.

== Reaction ==
=== Criticism ===
The original investigation and subsequent rulings have faced both faced significant criticism for their alleged use and support of racial profiling and Black criminality in policing; Stanford Law professor Ralph Richard Banks and journalist Lynne Duke have both written extensively on such criticisms.

=== Brothers Of The Black List ===
A 2014 feature-length documentary film titled "Brothers Of The Black List" detailed the events of the case and preceding incident. The film was directed by Sean Gallagher, a graduate of the university, and filmmaker Jonathan Demme.
