= Felipe Paullier =

UN senior official

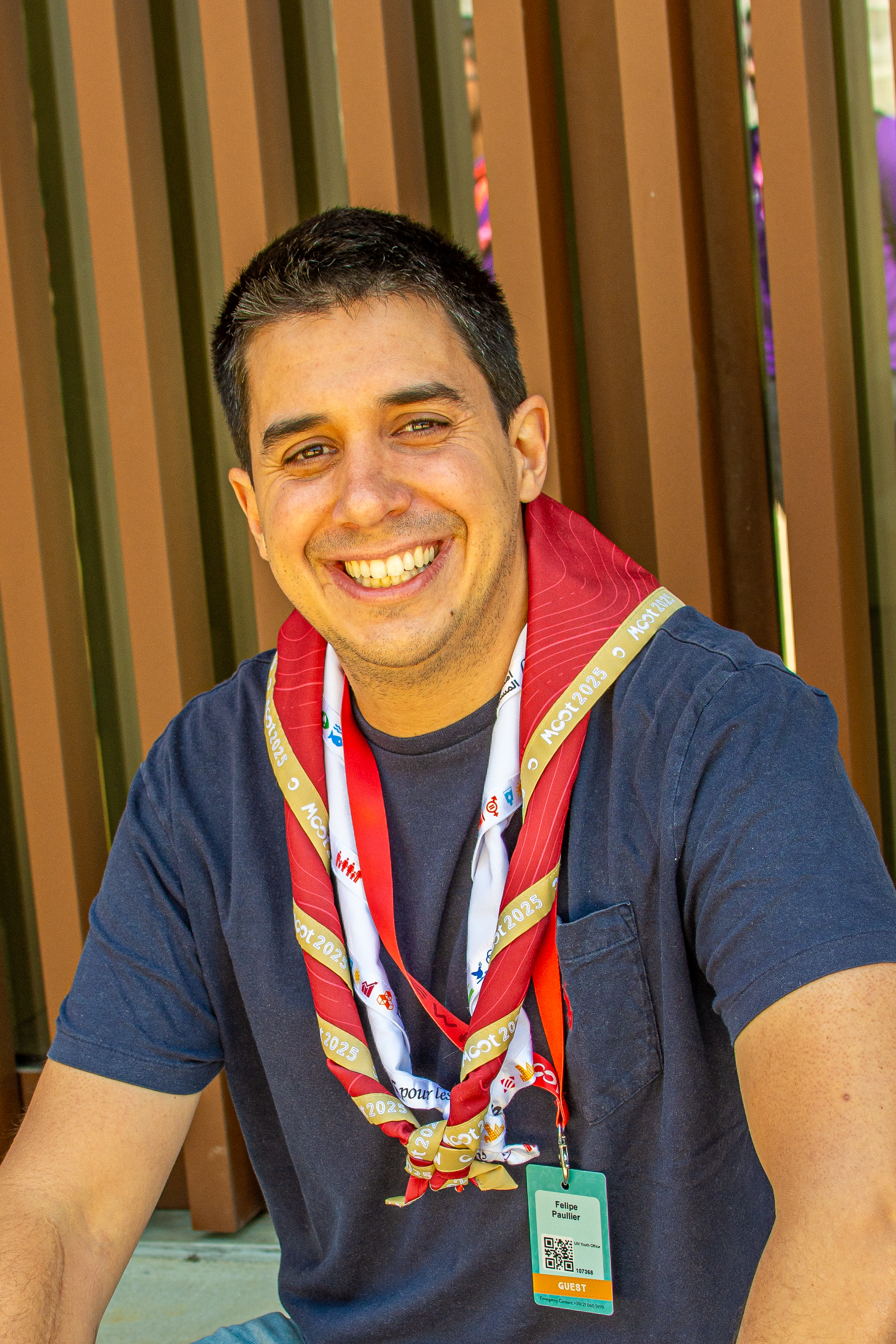
- Felipe Paullier at the 16th World Scout Moot in Portugal.
- Born: January 26, 1991 (age 35); Uruguay
- Organization: United Nations
- Known for: First-ever Assistant Secretary-General for Youth Affairs

Felipe Paullier is a Uruguayan physician and senior official at the United Nations. In December 2023, he was appointed as the first United Nations Assistant Secretary-General for Youth Affairs at the age of 32. At the time of his appointment, he was noted as the youngest senior official in the history of the United Nations and the youngest member of the Secretary-General's senior management group.

== Education ==
Born in Uruguay, Paullier trained as a Medical Doctor with a specialization in pediatrics. He earned his medical degree from the University of the Republic in Uruguay and later pursued a Master in Business Administration (MBA) from the Catholic University of Uruguay.

== Career ==
Paullier has been involved in youth advocacy and policymaking throughout his career. Before joining the UN, he held various positions in international diplomacy and governance, including as the Director General of the National Youth Institute of Uruguay, where he contributed to advancing youth participation in national policymaking. In December 2023, he was appointed as the UN Assistant Secretary-General for Youth Affairs, heading the newly established youth office. In this capacity, he oversees global work on meaningful youth engagement across sustainable development, human rights, and peace and security, as well as coordination and accountability work within the UN system.

During the Summit of the Future held in September 2024, Paullier was involved in discussions about meaningful youth participation. In an interview with AP News, he stated that his role is not to represent youth voices directly but rather to advocate for their concerns to be integrated into the UN's work. He acknowledged the challenge of ensuring that youth engagement goes beyond token participation, noting commitments from governments to establish national-level youth engagement mechanisms and global principles. He also emphasized that institutions must adapt to a rapidly changing world where young people expect to be engaged as full partners rather than just beneficiaries.

Beyond his work at the Summit of the Future, Paullier has engaged with youth leaders and policymakers worldwide. In April 2024, he traveled to Ethiopia, where he met representatives from the Ethiopian Youth Network, Ethiopian government officials, and the UN Youth Taskforce to discuss the priorities, opportunities, and challenges faced by young people in the country, emphasizing the importance of rebuilding trust in multilateralism through meaningful youth engagement. He underscored that youth participation is a crucial step in restoring trust in global governance and that young people should be seen as partners in shaping international policies and decision-making. In November 2024, he participated in the launch of the Hope Network in Bahrain, where he highlighted the platform as a significant avenue for collaboration, knowledge-sharing, and forging impactful partnerships for youth engagement globally.

Pictures of Felipe Paullier
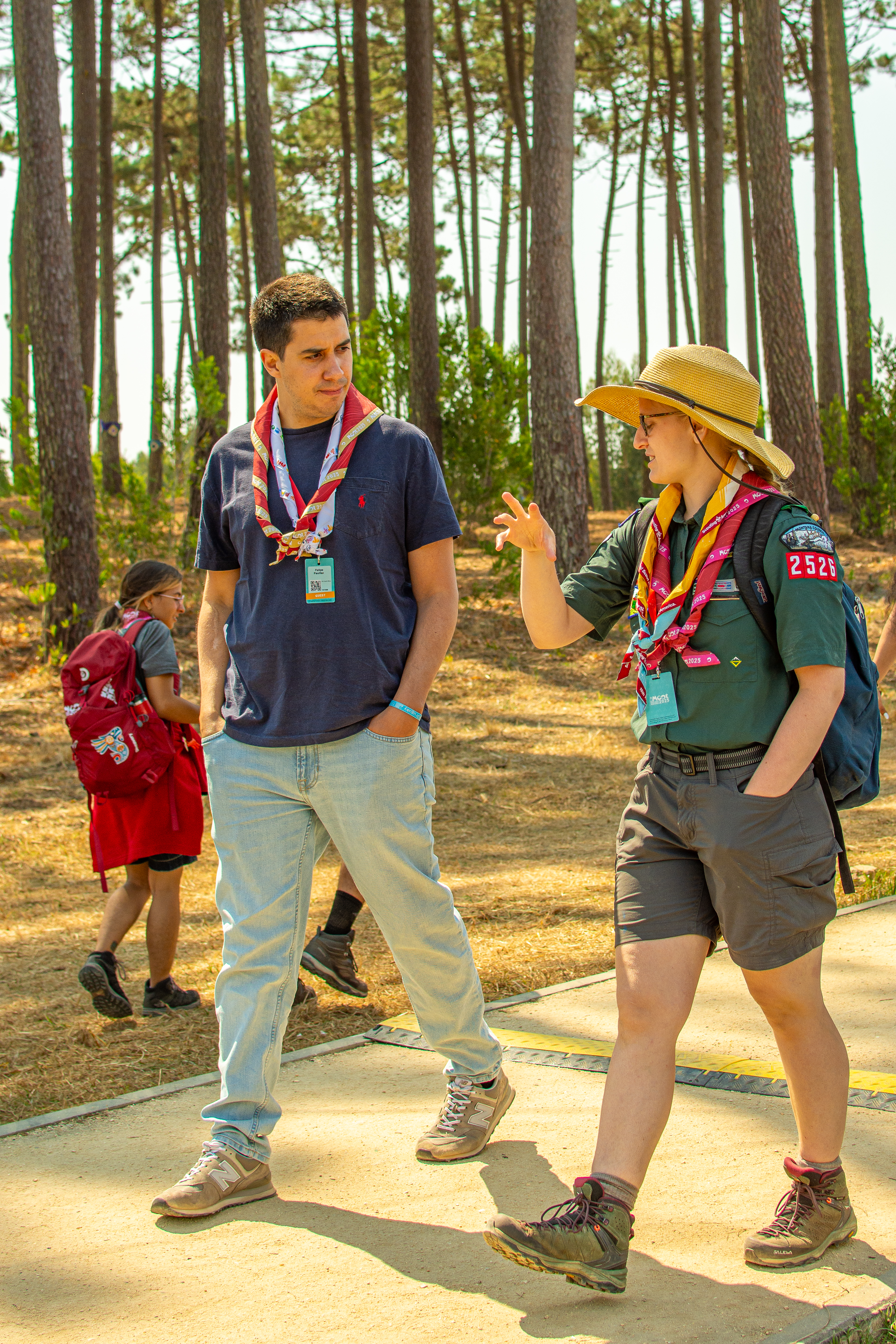
Felipe Paullier on the 16th World Scout Moot in Portugal in discussion with a participant.

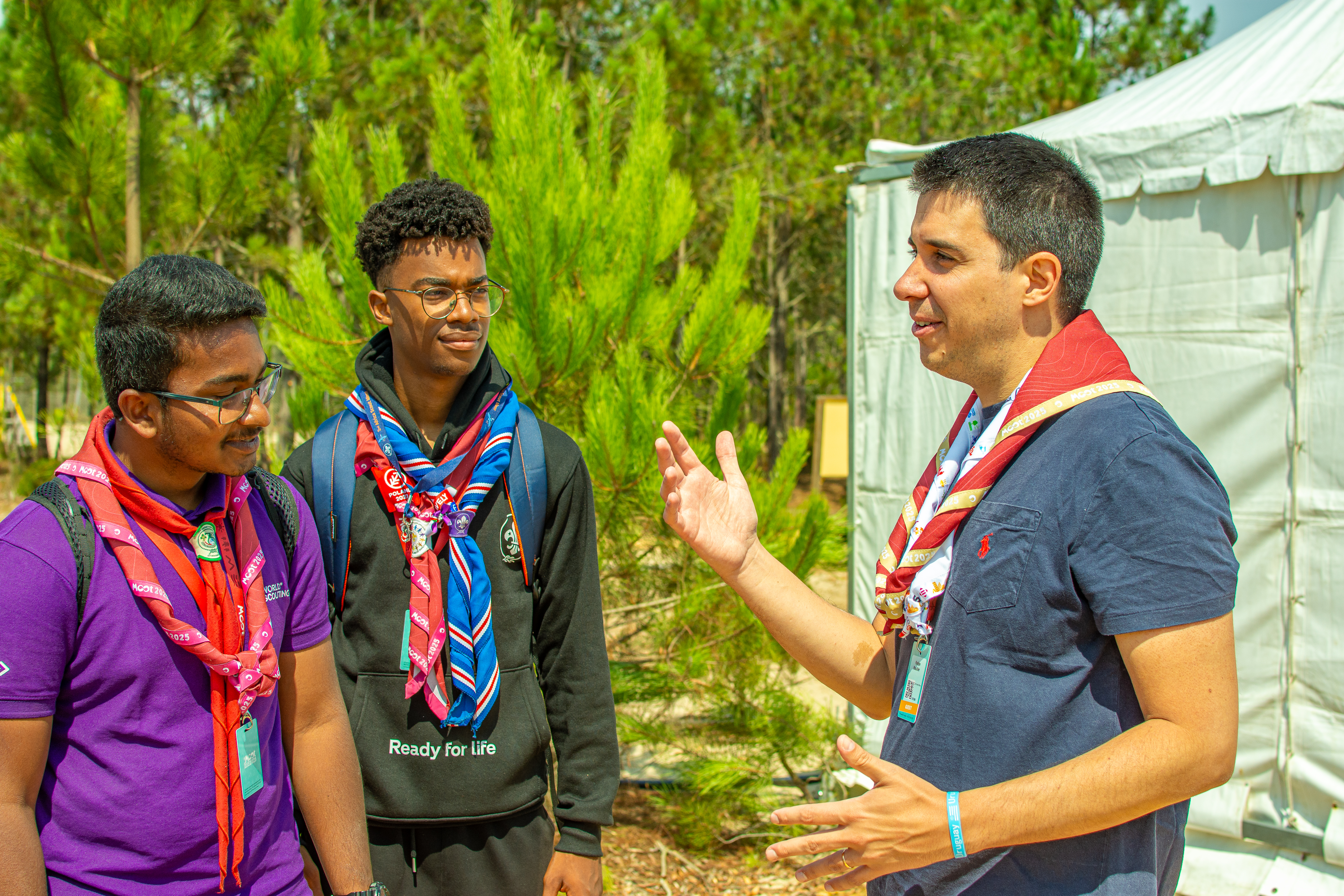
Felipe Paullier on the 16th World Scout Moot in Portugal in discussion with two participant.
