= Alberto Cardelle =

American educator and academic

9th President of the State University of New York at Oneonta
- Incumbent
- Assumed office September 6, 2021
- Preceded by: Dennis Craig (Interim)

Personal details
- Born: Alberto Jose Cardelle; June 19, 1964 (age 62)
- Spouse: Rachel Frick Cardelle
- Children: 3 (Marianela, Catalina, Josephine)
- Education: Tulane University; Boston University; University of Miami

Alberto Jose Cardelle is an American educator and academic who is currently serving as the 9th President of the State University of New York at Oneonta.

== Life and career ==
Cardelle is a native of Miami, Florida. He received a bachelor's degree in Biology and Latin American studies from Tulane University, a Master of Public Health degree from Boston University, and a doctoral degree in international studies from the University of Miami. Upon graduating, he held various positions in public health, working with groups like UNICEF and the World Health Organization.

Cardelle was an assistant professor of public health at East Stroudsburg University, and later became a vice-provost and dean there. He later served as a provost and vice president for academic affairs at Fitchburg State University.

In July 2021, SUNY Chancellor Jim Malatras and the SUNY Board of Trustees announced that they were appointing Cardelle as President of SUNY Oneonta. He assumed office on September 6, 2021.
