= Dennis Craig =

American academic administrator

Interim President of the State University of New York at Oneonta
- In office October 1, 2020 – September 6, 2021
- Preceded by: Barbara Jean Morris
- Succeeded by: Alberto Cardelle

Interim President of the State University of New York at Purchase
- In office August 1, 2019 – May 29, 2020
- Preceded by: Thomas Schwarz
- Succeeded by: Milagros Peña

Personal details
- Education: SUNY Plattsburgh; Fairleigh Dickinson University; Harvard University

Dennis Craig is an American academic administrator who served as the Interim President of both SUNY Purchase and SUNY Oneonta.

== Education ==
Craig graduated from SUNY Plattsburgh and obtained a master's in history from Farleigh Dickinson University. He also obtained a Management and Leadership in Higher Education certificate from Harvard University.

== Academic career ==
Craig served as the director of admissions at Montclair State University for five years. He has also served as the admissions director for the Culinary Institute of America. Craig joined SUNY Purchase in 2006 as a vice president.

On April 30, 2019, the State University of New York Board of Trustees appointed Craig to serve as interim president of SUNY Purchase following the announced departure of Thomas Schwarz, effective August 1, 2019.

Following the resignation of SUNY Oneonta President Barbara Jean Morris, Jim Malatras appointed Craig to serve as the interim president of SUNY Oneonta. After Alberto Cardelle was appointed to become the next president of the university, Craig returned to Purchase.
