= Barbara Jean Morris =

American academic administrator

18th President of Prescott College
- Incumbent
- Assumed office July 15, 2021
- Preceded by: John Flicker

8th President of the State University of New York at Oneonta
- In office July 1, 2018 – October 15, 2020
- Preceding: Nancy Kleniewski
- Succeeded by: Dennis Craig (Interim)

Personal details
- Born: Barbara Jean Morris
- Children: 3
- Education: San Diego State University (BA); University of California, Santa Barbara (MA, PhD)

Barbara Jean Morris is an American academic administrator who currently serves as the 18th president of Prescott College.

== Education ==
Morris completed a B.A. in political science at San Diego State University and M.A. and Ph.D. in political science at the University of California, Santa Barbara.

== Career ==
For 16 years, Morris worked at the University of Redlands, and later as dean of the College of Arts and Sciences. In 2011, she became provost and vice president for academic affairs at Fort Lewis College and was the elected representative from the academic council to serve on the Colorado Commission on Higher Education.

On July 1, 2018, Morris succeeded Nancy Kleniewski as the 8th president of the State University of New York (SUNY) at Oneonta, making her the second woman to serve in this role at the campus. During her tenure at SUNY Oneonta, Morris led the reimagining of the college's mission statement: "We nurture a community where students grow intellectually, strive socially, and live purposefully". Morris also created the first Memorandum of Agreement (MOA) with United University Professionals (UUP) in New York State, acknowledging the importance of adjunct teaching faculty, giving them the title and salary increase. She also collaborated with UUP to create uniform tenure and renewal policy and guidelines. Morris worked toward the inclusion of all students, administrators, and faculty staff, and brought into leadership people of different races, ethnicity, sex, marital status, and more. She broadened governance representation on the president's cabinet and reformulated the Budget Committee to give it more influence, adding more faculty voices. She provided students with a voice in decision-making including giving the Student Association a seat on the Cabinet and the Budget Committee. Morris also created a campus police task force at SUNY Oneonta to explore the relationship of the college's police department with students, staff, faculty, and the community.

In October 2020, Morris resigned from SUNY Oneonta under criticism that her administration mishandled planning for students to return to campus during the COVID-19 pandemic. The university had a coronavirus outbreak that infected more than 740 students in the weeks after reopening.

On July 15, 2021, Morris succeeded John Flicker to become the 18th president of Prescott College in Prescott, Arizona. After arriving at Prescott, Morris led the campus community in updating the Mission, Vision, and Values to reflect the college's experiential and student-centric leaning model. The six new values include Inclusive Community, Experiential and Field-Based Learning, Culture of Creativity, Justice, Individualized Education, and Regenerative Sustainability.

== Works and publications ==
Morris co-authored the manuscript, Recreating the Circle, which was published with The University of New Mexico Press. This book is a collaboration centering on the relationship between tribal, state, federal, and local governments. In addition, her co-authored article “Faith and Sex: Presidents under Pressure: Electoral Coalitions and Strategic Presidents” looks at the Executive Office of the President and women's and religious interest groups. Organizational theory, leadership practices, and strategies for cooperation all inform her research. Her co-authored article “Feminist Organizational Structure in the White House: The Office of Women’s Initiatives and Outreach,” investigates how organizational cultures impact leadership styles has helped her to recognize the importance of identifying organizational cultures in the practice of leadership.

== Personal life ==
Morris' father, Bobby Morris, is Cherokee and Comanche. Her paternal grandmother had Cherokee heritage. Morris traced her ancestry to the Trail of Tears. She has three children. In July 2019, she climbed Mount Kilimanjaro.

== See also ==
- List of women presidents or chancellors of co-ed colleges and universities
