= Travis Stone =

American horse racing announcer

Travis Stone (born January 23, 1984) is a public address announcer for thoroughbred horse racing at Churchill Downs racetrack in Louisville, Kentucky, in which he has served since 2015. Originally from Schroon Lake, he graduated from the State University of New York at Oneonta in Oneonta, New York.

In December 2014, Stone was named the new track announcer at Churchill Downs, where he became the on-track voice of the Kentucky Derby. Prior to his tenure at Churchill Downs, Stone had called race meetings at Aqueduct Racetrack, Monmouth Park and Louisiana Downs.

Stone, a two-time All-Star Announcer, grew into the game of horse racing at Saratoga Race Course in Saratoga Springs, New York. He spent three years writing for The Saratoga Special and The Keeneland Special at their respective meets. He also graduated from the Missouri Auction School during that time. His first live race call came at Suffolk Downs when he was just 18 years old.

Stone also called races as part of All-Star Announcer Day at Monmouth Park and Churchill Downs. His first two live race calls occurred at Suffolk Downs. He's also announced at Calder Race Course, Golden Gate Fields, Evangeline Downs, Sam Houston Race Park, Colonial Downs, and The Meadowlands. He has been featured in various trade publications, periodicals and television including Horse Racing Nation, HRTV, TVG, The Post-Star, The Albany Times Union, The Shreveport Times, The Daily Racing Form, The Thoroughbred Times and others. During the 2010 Gulfstream Park meet he joined Gulfstream Park's TV department as a Simulcast host and analyst with Caton Bredar and Alyssa Ali before returning to Louisiana Downs. In 2016, Stone was hired as the morning line maker at Saratoga Race Course.
