= James M. Milne =

First principal of SUNY Oneonta

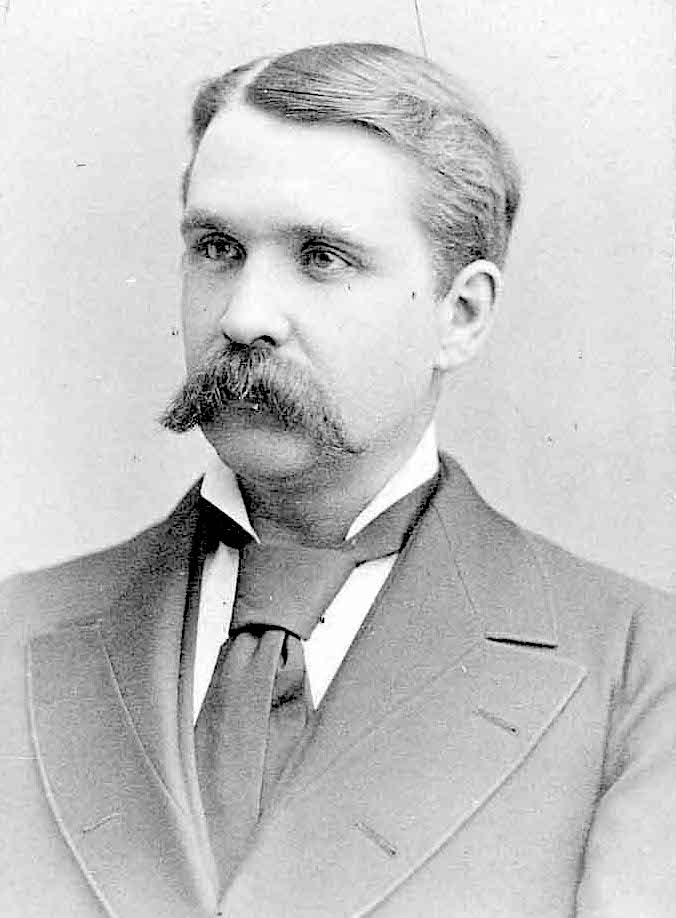

1st President of the State University of New York at Oneonta
- In office 1889–1898
- Preceded by: Position Established
- Succeeded by: Percy I. Bugbee

Personal details
- Born: James Mollison Milne Scotland
- Died: November 5, 1903 Waterville, New York
- Resting place: Cortland, New York
- Spouse: Susan M. Schermerhorn
- Education: Brockport Normal School; State Normal School at Geneseo; University of Rochester; Colgate University

James Mollison Milne (1850–1903) was the first principal of the State University of New York at Oneonta. The library at SUNY Oneonta is named in his honor.

Milne was born in Scotland on September 29, 1850. He was the older son of William D. Milne and Mary A. Milne. James M. Milne received his early education in Edinburgh before his family moved to America. Milne attended the Brockport Normal School (today SUNY Brockport). While at BNS he was a member of the Gamma Sigma Society, a literacy and debating club. He later transferred and graduated from the State Normal School at Geneseo (today SUNY Geneseo) and went on to attend the University of Rochester, where he earned a master's degree. He received his Ph.D. from Colgate University in Hamilton, New York. He was a longtime resident of Cortland, New York, where he was principal from 1873 to 1876 then became chair of Latin and Greek studies from 1877 to 1889 of the Cortland Normal School (today SUNY Cortland).

In 1871 Milne became a founding father of the Delphic Society while a student at the Geneseo Normal School. Milne is considered the "Founding Father of the Delphic Fraternity" because, while principal of the Oneonta Normal School, he help found the Beta chapter of the Delphic Society in 1889 thus creating the Delphic Fraternity.

On June 1, 1881 Milne was married to Susan M., elder daughter of Mr. and Mrs. James A. Schermerhorn of Cortland, NY. Milne was president of the New York State Teachers Association and a member of the law firm Fallows, Duffey and Milne in New York City.

In 1889, Milne was elected to become the first principal of the Oneonta Normal School. He stayed for nine years before he was forced to resign in 1898 due to a controversy with the board. He went on to study law and was admitted to the bar in 1901. On November 5, 1903, Milne was at a Masonic group meeting in Waterville, New York, where he gave a speech. Soon after finishing his address, he collapsed and died. He was buried in Cortland, New York.
