= State University of New York at Oneonta =

Public university in Oneonta, New York

Coordinates: 42.4695°N 75.0640°W

- Former names: Oneonta State Normal School (1889–1942); New York State Teachers College at Oneonta (1942–1962); State University of New York College at Oneonta (1962–2023)
- Motto: Founded in Honor and Good Faith
- Type: Public university
- Established: 1889; 137 years ago
- Parent institution: State University of New York
- Endowment: $85.6 million (2025)
- Chancellor: John B. King Jr.
- President: Alberto Cardelle
- Provost: Enrique Morales-Diaz
- Students: 5,533 (fall 2025)
- Undergraduates: 4,815 (fall 2025)
- Postgraduates: 718 (fall 2025)
- Location: Oneonta, New York, U.S.
- Campus: 250 acres (100 ha); Rural
- Nickname: Red Dragons
- Sporting affiliations: NCAA Division III
- Website: suny.oneonta.edu
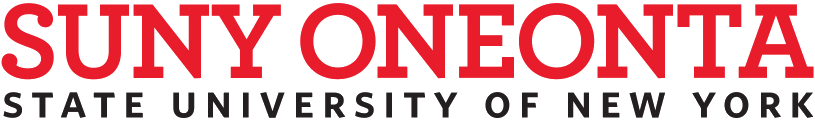

The State University of New York at Oneonta, also known as SUNY Oneonta, is a public university in Oneonta, New York, United States. It is part of the State University of New York (SUNY) system.

== History ==
=== 19th century ===
SUNY Oneonta was established in 1889 as the Oneonta Normal School, as part of founding normal schools across the state to train teachers and expand public education. It was located in a building nicknamed "Old Main" at the top of Maple Street in the city of Oneonta. The school's first principal was James M. Milne, for whom the college's current library is named. For nearly 40 years, Old Main was the only building on campus, until 1933 when Bugbee School was built. Named after Percy I. Bugbee, the second principal of the Oneonta Normal School, Bugbee School provided an on-campus training facility for the student teachers attending the normal school.

=== 20th century ===
In 1942, the school changed names for the first time, becoming the New York State Teachers College at Oneonta.

In 1948, the college became a founding member of the State University of New York system, and the Oneonta Normal School was officially renamed the State University College of Education at Oneonta in 1951. Royal F. Netzer was the college's president from 1951 to 1970, presiding over a period of tremendous growth. The three joined buildings known as the Morris Conference Complex were the first ones erected on the current campus. The cornerstone of the current building was laid in 1950, with one wing being completed in February 1951 and the other in September 1951. The two wings, Bacon and Denison Halls, were originally used as dormitories, which were much needed on the rapidly expanding campus.

In 1952, the Faculty-Student Association Inc. (the forerunner of today's Oneonta Auxiliary Services) purchased a 63-acre (25 ha) farm about four miles (6.4 km) north of the college. This was the site for development of today's 272-acre (110 ha) College Camp, which provides educational, recreational and social opportunities for the college community.

Home economics programs were added to the college's teacher education programs. In 1954, a Home Economics building and heating plant were constructed on the upper campus. These were followed in 1958 with the construction of a women's dormitory, Wilber Hall, followed by Tobey Hall 1959.

The 1960s were a period of rapid growth in the college's operating budget, student enrollment, number of staff members, and the campus buildings. To alleviate the shortage of classrooms, 10 mobile classrooms were brought in as a temporary solution. Additional property was acquired to the north and west of the campus, providing two entrances from West Street, one near a new service building.

The first library on the upper campus was built in what is today's Alumni Hall. Other new buildings on the upper campus included a dorm, Littel Hall; a cafeteria (Lee Hall) and the Chase Physical Fitness Center. A path connected the upper campus with Old Main, which was slowly being phased out as the main academic building.

In 1962, the college took on a new name, becoming the State University of New York College at Oneonta. The following year, the college started accepting transfer students into 13 liberal arts programs, beginning the transition to a multi-purpose higher education institution.

In 1964, a men's dormitory (Golding Hall) and the first science building, known as Science I, were built. These were followed in 1966 with the construction of four administration and class buildings (Mills Dining Hall, Schumacher, Netzer and Hodgdon Instructional Resource Center), five dormitories (Ford, Grant, Hays, Huntington and Sherman halls) and the health center.

The late 1960s were a period of rapid faculty turnover. Between 1966 and 1970, there were 205 faculty resignations, retirements or contract terminations. With 35 or 40 new positions each year, the number of new faculty members increased from 35 in 1963 to 80 or more from 1966 to 1970. With the rapid growth in the number of faculty, the college's four major academic departments began to split into separate departments. The Department of English, Speech and Theater, which also included Foreign Languages, was the first to subdivide in 1969 into three departments: English, Speech and Theater, and Foreign Languages. In 1970, the Science Department split into separate departments of Biology, Chemistry, Earth Science, Physics and Science Education, and the Social Science Department split into six separate departments.

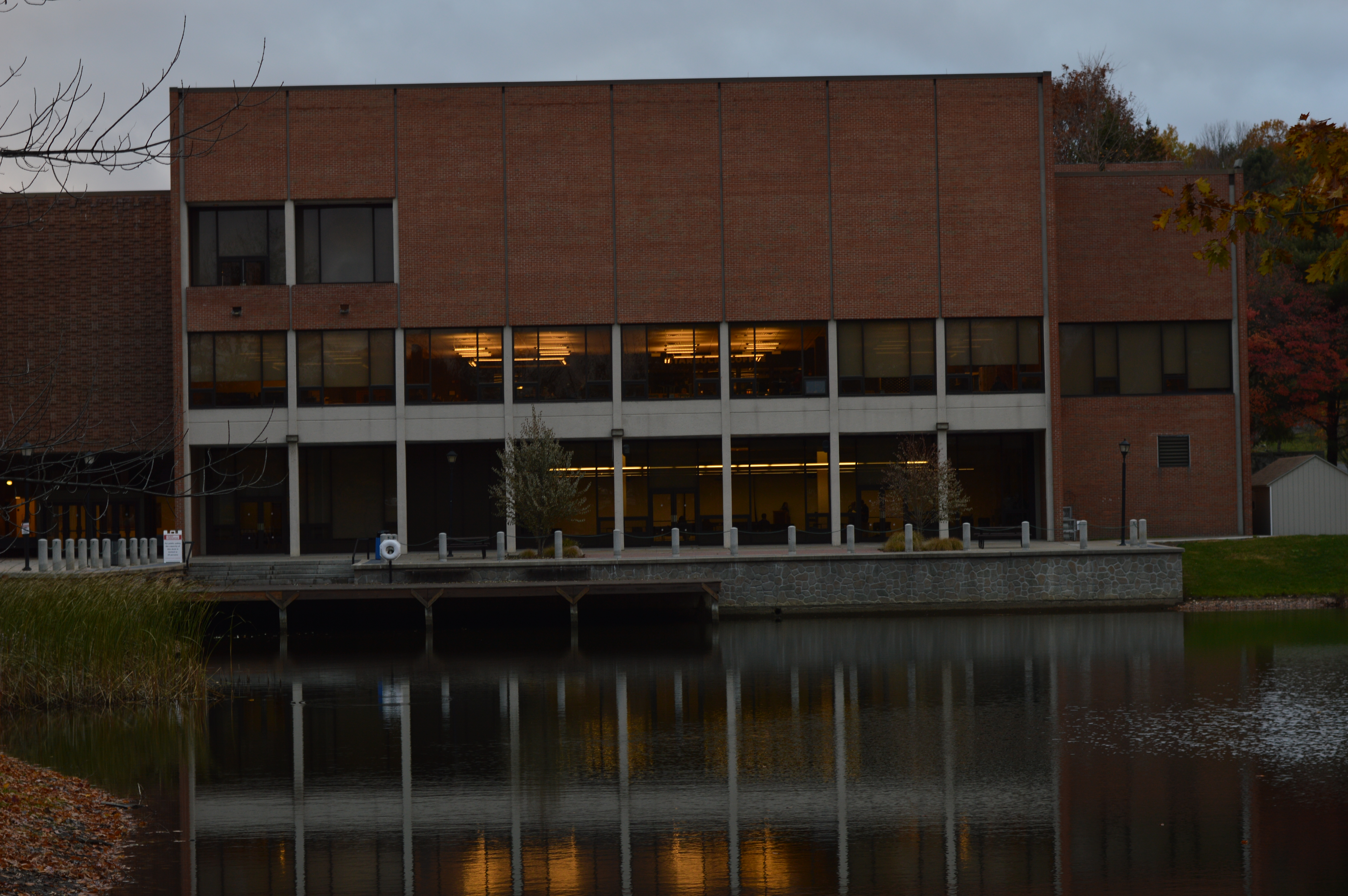
The Hunt Union Building, named for Charles W. Hunt

By the early 1970s, several more new buildings had been constructed, including academic facilities (Fitzelle Hall, Fine Arts, Science II and the current Milne Library), Wilsbach Dining Hall, five dormitories (Matteson, MacDuff, Curtis, Blodgett and Hulbert halls) and the Hunt College Union, named for Charles W. Hunt, who served as the school's principal/president from 1933 to 1951.

A field station on Otsego Lake in Cooperstown, New York was also completed, stimulated by a gift of an additional 300 to 400 acres (120 to 160 ha). The new building housed an environmental laboratory facility for the Biology Department. It also held the new graduate program in the Conservation of Historic and Artistic Objects, the forerunner to today's Cooperstown Graduate Program in museum studies.

Between 1972 and 1980, teacher education enrollments declined dramatically, while liberal arts enrollments increased. The 1970s were a decade of state budget problems and declining enrollments. Clifford Craven led the college as president from 1970 to 1987.

The historic Old Main building was torn down in 1977, and in 1981, two pillars from the building were installed on a hill overlooking the SUNY Oneonta campus as a reminder of the college's history. Today, they are part of a campus tradition for new and graduating students called "Pass Through the Pillars."

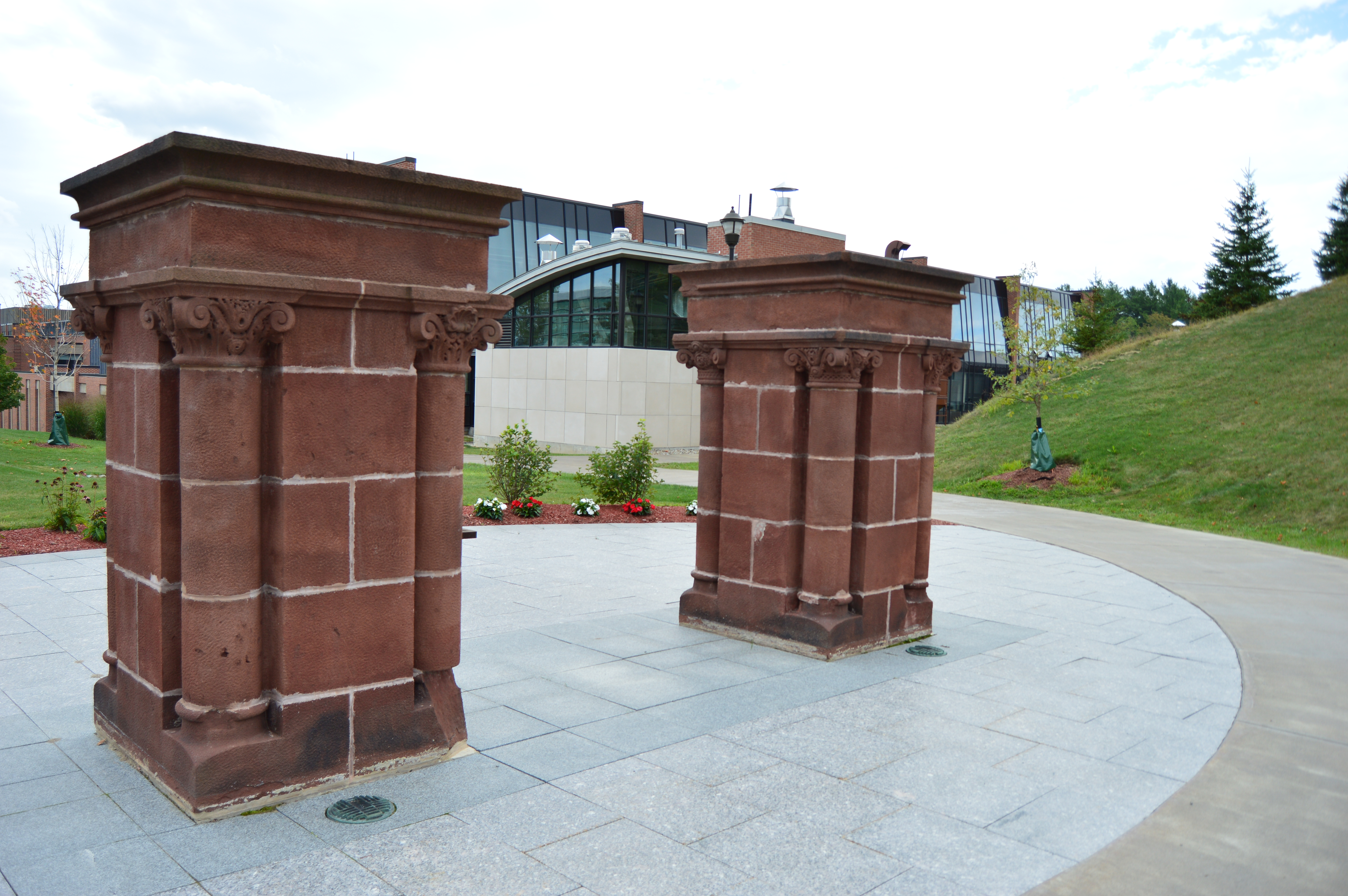
Pillars leftover from the Old Main Building, a special part of the "Pass through the pillars" tradition

In 1982, the college at Oneonta Foundation was formed with the mission of raising and administering gifts and grants to enhance the academic status of the college through endowment, scholarships and institutional programs. Alan B. Donovan served as college president from 1988 to 2008. Accomplishments during his tenure included advancements in technology, including Internet access; a more competitive admissions process, expanded multicultural programs and increased financial stability. The college's endowment grew from $1.9 million when Donovan joined SUNY Oneonta in 1988, to $30 million when he left.

Challenges during Donovan's era included student violence in downtown Oneonta and racial tension on campus. The college made national news in Fall 1992 during an incident known as the "Black List." On the morning of September 4, 1992, a 77-year-old woman told police she was attacked at the home of a family she was visiting outside the town of Oneonta. She concluded her assailant was black, by seeing only his hand. Police officers believed that blood at the scene indicated the assailant suffered a cut on his hand from a knife he had wielded. College officials provided New York State Police a list of 78 black and Latino male students to aid in the investigation, provoking outrage and national attention. In the following days, police questioned hundreds of African Americans in the area. Many members of the black community of Oneonta were stopped multiple times over several days. The perpetrator was never found. In 2012, SUNY Oneonta President Nancy Kleniewski announced the formation of the September 4 Commemorations Committee to develop programming to mark and remember what she termed a "low point" in the school's history.

In the 1990s SUNY Oneonta extended its commitments to community partnership, founding the Center for Economic and Community Development, and the Center for Social Responsibility and Community. Several construction projects were completed under Donovan, including the Alumni Field House in 1998 and the Robin Ross Higgins Hall in 2003.

=== 21st century ===
In 2003, a $10-million renovation to the Human Ecology facilities was also completed.

In 2008, Nancy Kleniewski began her tenure as SUNY Oneonta's seventh president. In 2009, she convened the Strategic Planning and Resource Council, composed of faculty, staff, students, alumni and community members and charged with developing a strategic plan to help define the college's future.

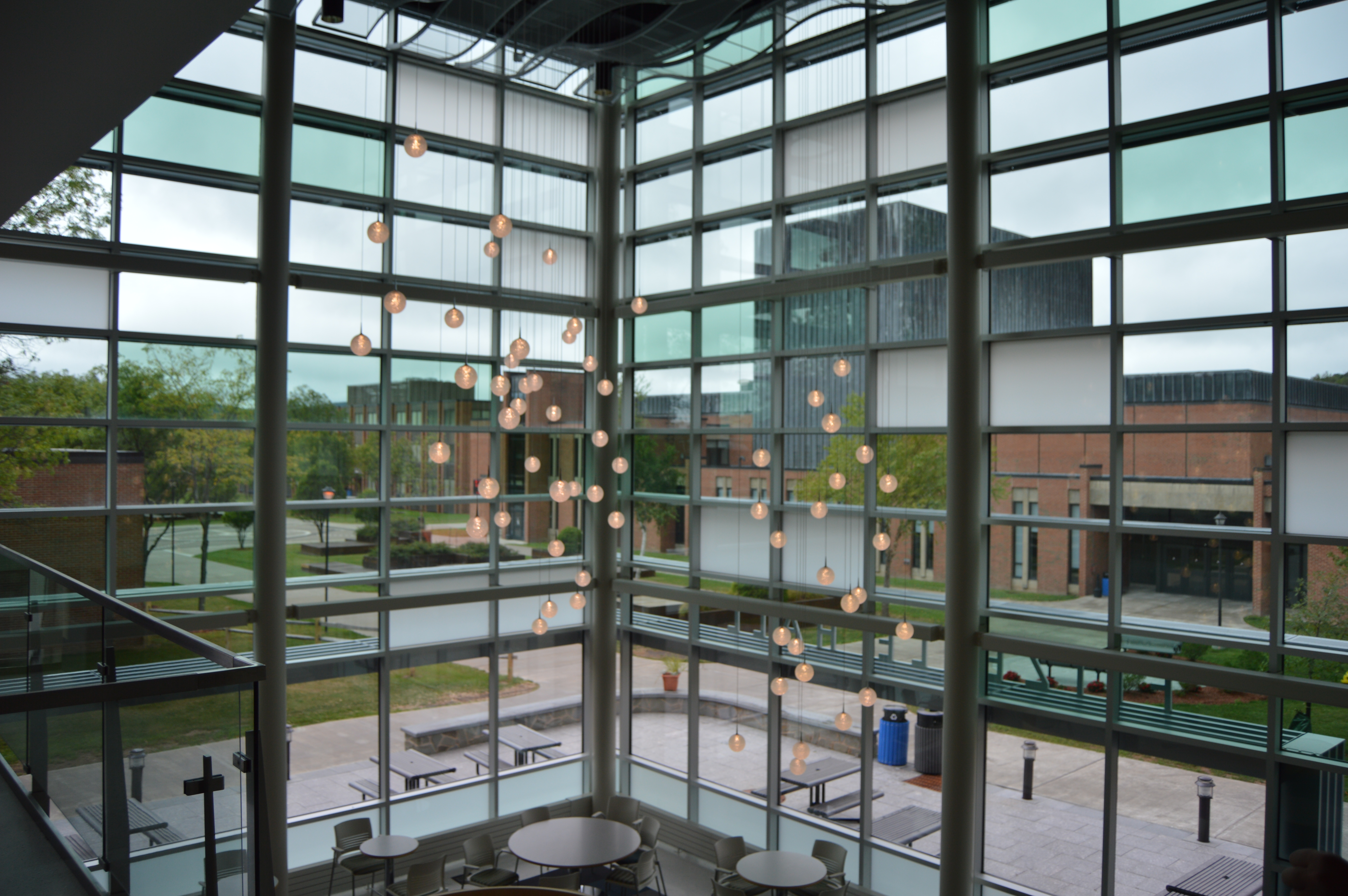
The Atrium inside Fitzelle Hall

In fall 2013, SUNY Oneonta reorganized, founding five new schools—Economics and Business, Arts and Humanities, Social Science, Natural and Mathematical Sciences, and Education and Human Biology—to give greater focus to disciplines and careers in those areas.

President Barbara Jean Morris came to SUNY Oneonta in July 2018 from her position as provost and vice president for academic affairs at Fort Lewis College.

Dennis Craig was hired as an interim president in October 2020 following the departure of Dr. Morris. He held the position until Alberto J.F. Cardelle was named as president of SUNY Oneonta. His appointment began on September 6, 2021.

Two years later, the school officially gained university status from the state of New York and rebranded as the State University of New York at Oneonta.

Presidents of SUNY Oneonta
No.	Image	Name	Term
1		James M. Milne	1889–1898
2		Percy I. Bugbee	1898–1933
3		Charles W. Hunt	1933–1951
4		Royal F. Netzer	1951–1970
5		Clifford J. Craven	1970–1987
		Carey W. Brush (Acting)	1987–1988
6		Alan B. Donovan	1988–2008
7		Nancy Kleniewski	2008–2018
8		Barbara Jean Morris	2018–2020
		Dennis Craig (Acting)	2020–2021
9		Alberto Cardelle	2021–Present

== Academics ==
SUNY Oneonta enrolls about 5,500 students who pursue bachelor's or master's degrees or certificates in one of 60-plus academic programs. In 2023, U.S. News & World Report ranked SUNY Oneonta tied for #75 in Regional Universities North with an acceptance rate of 70%, a graduation rate of 60%, a 26% minority enrollment, and with enrolled students having an average SAT range of 959–1157, an average ACT Range of 18–26, and an average high school GPA of 3.5.

=== Accreditations ===
The Middle States Commission on Higher Education accredits the college. The Association to Advance Collegiate Schools of Business accredits the college's business programs. The American Association of Family and Consumer Sciences accredits the undergraduate programs offered by SUNY Oneonta's Human Ecology Department. The Accreditation Council for Education in Nutrition and Dietetics accredits the undergraduate Dietetics program. The National Council for Accreditation of Teacher Education accredits the college's education programs. The National Association of Schools of Music accredits the programs offered by the Music Department. The National Association of Schools of Theatre accredits the programs offered by the Theatre Department.

=== Experiential learning ===
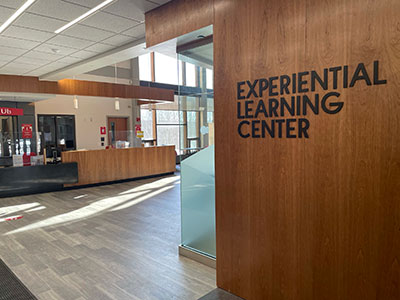
Experiential Learning Center

SUNY Oneonta offers semester- and year-long study abroad and exchange programs through the Office of Global Education. Students also participate in a short-term faculty-led field course. These trips are usually part of a semester-long or summer course and typically last 10 days to three weeks, offering hands-on learning in a student's field of study.

Connections with Oneonta alumni through programs such as the annual Backpacks to Briefcases networking event for business students help students land internships further afield, and many of these opportunities lead to full-time employment after graduation.

Students have collaborated with faculty on a variety of research topics, including a green chemistry invention that won a United States patent. Students also do independent research on topics of their own choosing, guided by faculty mentors, and present them at SUNY Oneonta's annual Student Research & Creative Activity Day on campus. Grant awards are available for independent research and creative activity projects conducted by students with faculty sponsorship in any discipline or interdisciplinary area.

Many students also present their research at regional and national conferences, and funding is available to help defray travel expenses through the Caroline '67 and David D'Antonio Undergraduate Student Travel for Excellence Fund and the Student Travel for Excellence Program.

=== Notable facilities ===
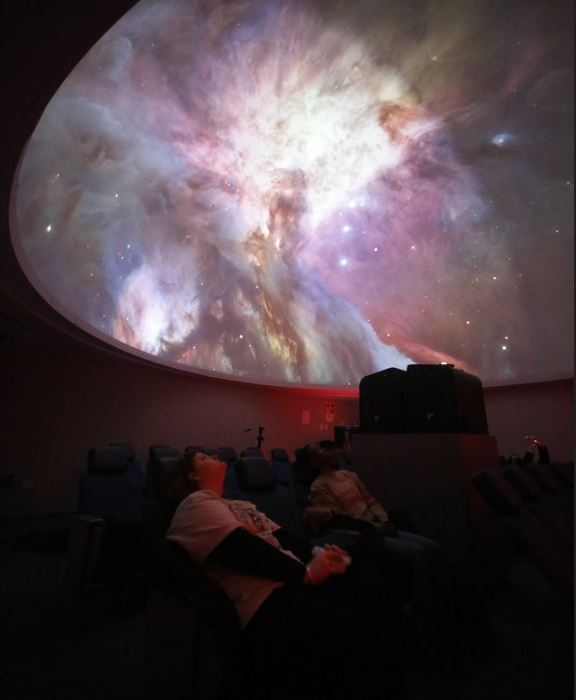
Planetarium

The planetarium is used in many science classes across campus.

The Science Discovery Center is a science center open to students and the public, and offers a variety of educational activities.

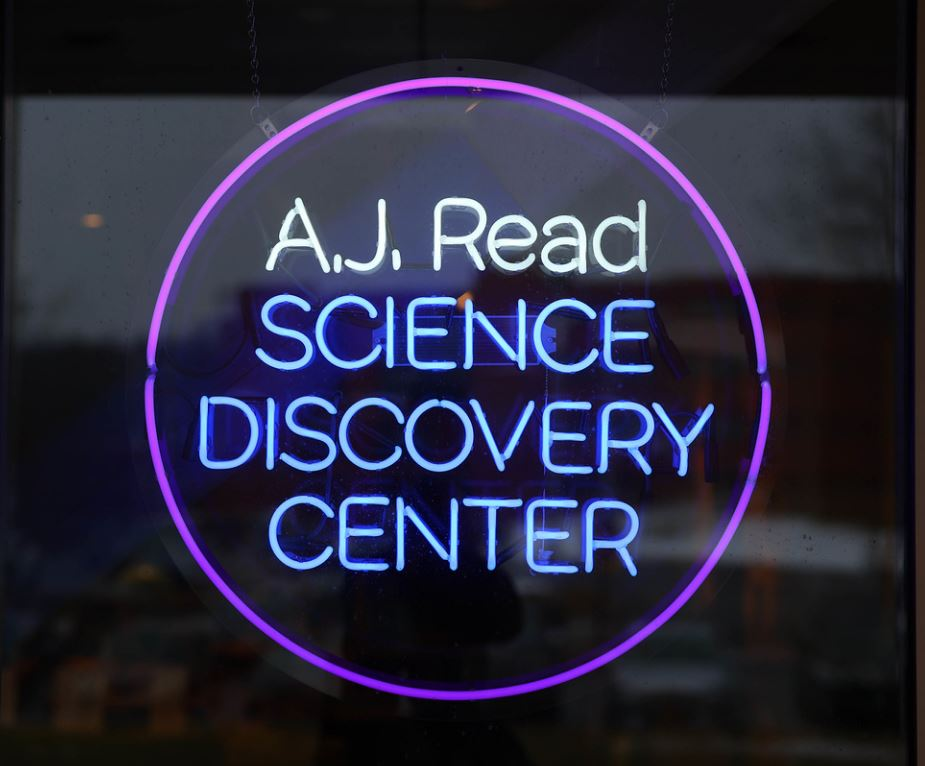
A.J. Read Science Discovery Center

The SUNY Oneonta College Observatory is the largest optical telescope in New York State, one that is believed to be one of the largest telescopes open for public observing east of the Mississippi.

The College Camp is located on 276 acres (112 ha) of former farm and woodland. The camp comprises various types of forest that warrant various management techniques. In winter 2012–13 the Camp was surveyed by a state forester from the New York State Department of Environmental Conservation (NYSDEC) who compiled a complete analysis, description, and recommended management plan for the property.

=== Conferences ===
The SUNY Oneonta Undergraduate Political Science Conference is a tradition hosted by the Oneonta Political Science Club and the Political Science Department. The first conference was hosted March 20–21, 2009. The keynote speaker for that year was Alan Chartock, Professor Emeritus at SUNY Albany and host of The Capitol Connection.

The SUNY Oneonta Undergraduate Philosophy Conference is an annual conference. First conceived in 1995 under the supervision of the late Douglas Shrader, Distinguished Teaching Professor of Philosophy at SUNY Oneonta, the event is sponsored by the college's Philosophy Club and organized by a student Conference Committee.

The SUNY Oneonta New Critics Undergraduate Literature and Composition Conference is hosted each spring by the English Department.

SUNY Oneonta hosts the PRISM Conference, previously the SUNY Pride conference.

== Student life ==
Undergraduate demographics as of Fall 2023
Race and ethnicity	Total
White	70%
Hispanic	17%
Black	6%
Asian	2%
Two or more races	2%
Unknown	2%
Economic diversity
Low-income (Note: The percentage of students who received an income-based federal Pell grant intended for low-income students.)	33%
Affluent (Note: The percentage of students who are a part of the American middle class at the bare minimum.)	67%

=== Campus living ===
Over 3,000 students live in SUNY Oneonta's 15 residence halls, which offer living arrangements ranging from doubles to apartments. Dining services at SUNY Oneonta are offered by Sodexo, and the college's residential dining halls were the first in the country designed specifically for Sodexo's Campus Crossroads program. Dining plans are unlimited and offer options for additional dollars for purchases at cafes and other retail facilities on campus.

=== Clubs and organizations ===
SUNY Oneonta offers students over 150 clubs and organizations that supports a wide variety of interests.

==== WIRE TV ====
WIRE TV (Campus Channel 73, Time Warner Channel 23) is SUNY Oneonta's student-run television station. The station produces over 4 hours of original programming each week, in addition to Live Sporting events.

==== WONY ====
WONY 90.9 FM is SUNY Oneonta's student-run radio station. It was founded in 1962 and broadcasts both online and through physical radio, and is active 24/7.

== Athletics ==
Oneonta Red Dragons
- University: SUNY Oneonta
- Nickname: Red Dragons
- NCAA: Division III
- Conference: SUNYAC
- Athletic director: Ryan Hooper
- Location: Oneonta, New York
- Varsity teams: 21 (10 Men & 11 Women)
- Football stadium: Field Hockey/Lacrosse Venue
- Basketball arena: Dewar Arena
- Colors: Red, white, and grey
- Mascot: Red Dragon
- Website: oneontaathletics.com

The Oneonta Red Dragons athletics program represent SUNY Oneonta, State University of New York. The school's team currently competes at the Division III level in the State University of New York Athletic Conference, and has been since the conference's inception in 1958. Oneonta's athletic teams also compete in the Eastern College Athletic Conference.

=== Facilities ===
The school facilities include Dewar Arena in the Alumni Field House, All College Field, Chase Athletic Building, and Red Dragon Soccer, Baseball and Softball fields.

Venue	Sport(s)	Ref.
Alumni Field House	Basketball; Track and field (indoor)	
All College Field and Track	Field Hockey; Track and field (outdoor)	
Red Dragon Baseball Field	Baseball	
Red Dragon Softball Field	Softball	
Red Dragon Field	Soccer; Lacrosse	
Dewar Arena	Volleyball	
Chase Physical Education Building	Swimming	
Joseph A. Heissan courts	Tennis	
Fortin Park	Cross country	

== Notable people ==
=== Alumni ===
- Marty Appel – author, public relations official, New York Yankees
- Bruce Avolio – academic and psychologist
- Oluwale Bamgbose – professional mixed martial artist, formerly competing in the UFC's middleweight division
- Jennifer Bernet – member of the New Hampshire House of Representatives
- Edward Burns – actor, director
- Scott Coffel – poet
- Nigel Connor – player and manager of the Anguillian National football team.
- Roy Freiman (born 1959) – politician who has represented the 16th Legislative District in the New Jersey General Assembly since 2018
- Ron Garan – NASA astronaut
- Don Garber – Major League Soccer commissioner.
- Anthony P. German – Adjutant General of New York
- Henry Glassie – author and professor
- Victoria Graffeo – associate judge of the New York Court of Appeals
- Judy Griffin – New York State Assemblywoman, author
- Kaitlyn Herman – contestant, Big Brother 20
- Robin Higgins – Under Secretary for Memorial Affairs (ret.), U.S. Department of Veterans Affairs
- Joe Howarth – professional soccer player in the American Soccer League and Major Indoor Soccer League
- Amy Ignatow – author and illustrator of the Popularity Papers series of children's books
- Mary Isaacson – member of the Pennsylvania House of Representatives
- Jingyu Lin – inventor of the MicroLED
- Lori Lite – author
- Ian Travis MacMillan – author, creative writing professor
- Matt McGinley – drummer, co-founder of Gym Class Heroes
- Roy McDonald – New York Senator
- Andy McKean – Iowa representative
- Tim Melia – professional soccer player
- Jim Neu – playwright
- Sal Paolantonio – ESPN NFL reporter
- Antonio Pérez (born 1946) – New York City educator
- Janet Perna – computer scientist and IBM business executive
- Bill Pullman – actor, director, producer
- Farrukh Quraishi – Hermann Trophy-winning, former professional soccer player and executive
- Stephen Rannazzisi – actor, comedian
- Ron Sanchez – college basketball coach
- Al Schnier – musician, guitarist for the American jam band moe.
- Dermot Shea – 44th Police Commissioner of New York City
- John W. Sidgmore – corporate executive
- Jack Smith – Special Counsel for the United States Department of Justice
- Elaine Sortino – University of Massachusetts Amherst softball coach
- John Stein – academic
- Caryl M. Stern – author and activist
- Travis Stone – horse racing announcer
- Linda Swartz Taglialatela – United States diplomat
- Joe Viscusi – former member of the Florida House of Representatives
- George William Thompson – author, attorney and professor
- Keith Tozer – professional soccer player and coach
- Chris Wade – mixed martial artist
- Roger Watkins – film director and actor
- Jessamine S. Whitney – statistician, National Tuberculosis Association
- Marian Young – biologist
- James Zachos - Oceanographer, Professor, University of California, Santa Cruz

=== Faculty ===
- Jaffe Cohen – professor of television and film writing
- Blake Fleming – founder of The Mars Volta and Dazzling Killmen, drum instructor and History of Rock Instructor
- Jeremy Wall – founder of jazz fusion group Spyro Gyra, various music classes
