= Percy I. Bugbee =

American academic (died 1935)

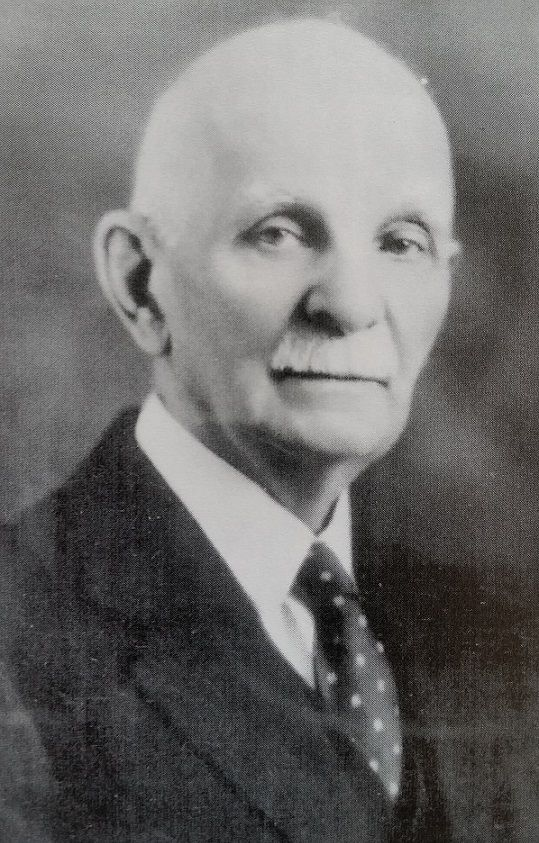

2nd President of the State University of New York at Oneonta
- In office 1898–1933
- Preceded by: James M. Milne
- Succeeded by: Charles W. Hunt

Personal details
- Born: Percy Isaac Bugbee Colton, New York
- Died: May 15, 1935 (Age 77) White Plains, New York
- Spouse: Ida Maria Farns
- Education: St. Lawrence University

Percy Isaac Bugbee was an American academic administrator and mathematics professor who served as the second president of the State University of New York at Oneonta.

== Early life and education ==
Bugbee was born in Colton, New York to John F. and Clementina P. Gates Bugbee. His family soon moved to Canton, New York. He attended and graduated from St. Lawrence University. While in college, he was a member of the Beta Theta Pi fraternity and the Phi Beta Kappa honor society.

== Career ==
Bugbee was an educator in Colton, and later served as principle of schools in Naples, New York and Newark, New York. When the State Normal School at Oneonta (today SUNY Oneonta) opened in 1889, Bugbee became a professor of mathematics at the institution. He would serve in this role until he became the conductor of the New York State Teachers’ Association.

While a professor at Oneonta, Percy I. Bugbee became an honorary member of the Delphic Fraternity.

In 1898, Bugbee was put in charge of the State Normal School at Oneonta, succeeding James M. Milne. He would serve as the second leader of the school until 1933, when he resigned shortly after the death of his wife, Ida Maria Farns.

Bugbee held many honors, and was a skilled orator. He was a member of the Otsego County Draft Board, was once the President of the Council of Normal School Principals, and served on Oneonta's Board of Education for over two decades.

== Personal life ==
Bugbee was a Universalist Christian.

== Death ==
Bugbee died on May 15, 1935, in White Plains, New York.
