= John Stein (academic) =

- Education: State University of New York at Oneonta; Long Island University; State University of New York at Albany
- Occupation: Dean of students

John Stein has been dean of students at the Georgia Institute of Technology since 2006.

== Education ==
Stein went to Nazareth Regional High School in Brooklyn, New York, and graduated in 1975. He received a Bachelor of Arts in psychology in 1979 from State University of New York at Oneonta and a Master of Science in counseling and student personnel administration in 1982 from Long Island University. He later received a Master of Science in educational psychology from the State University of New York at Albany in 1997.

== Career ==
After receiving his degree from Long Island University, Stein was a student affairs employee at Skidmore College from 1982 to 1997.

After receiving his degree in educational psychology from SUNY, he became a dean of students at Sarah Lawrence College in Westchester County, New York, from 1997 to 2000, at subsequently at Manhattanville College in Purchase, New York, from 2000 to 2002.

In August 2002, Stein became director of success programs at the Georgia Institute of Technology in Atlanta, Georgia, and was subsequently promoted to his current position of dean of students in March 2006 after serving as interim dean of students for six months before being named assistant vice president and dean of students. Stein was promoted to vice president and dean of students in August 2015.

He was replaced as vice president by LuoLuo Hong.

== Controversy ==
While dean at Georgia Tech, he was accused of a lack of due process by students and fraternities. This resulted in lawsuits that resulted in students who were accused of sexual misconduct being reinstated and winning settlements. As a result of the events, Tech dropped its $47 million request for funding.

Students also complained about the lack of funding for counseling services and the failure to keep promises to improve student health services. This has been highlighted by multiple student deaths on campuses and violent student protests on campus. This has also resulted in a wrongful death lawsuit by parents. This lawsuit resulted in a settlement of $1 million.

There also have been allegations of political discrimination against student groups going back to 2006 which resulted in a lawsuit. This resulted in a settlement by Georgia Tech of $50,000.

Georgia Tech had to resolve a complaint of anti-semitism because of blatant anti-Semitic exclusion and harassment at a campus group event.
