= Nancy Kleniewski =

American sociologist and academic administrator

7th President of the State University of New York at Oneonta
- In office 2008–2018
- Preceded by: Alan B. Donovan
- Succeeded by: Barbara Jean Morris

Personal details
- Born: Nancy Kleniewski
- Spouse: Bill Davis

Nancy Kleniewski is an American sociologist and academic administrator who served as the president of the State University of New York at Oneonta.

== Career ==
Kleniewski was a sociologist and held administrative posts at the University of Massachusetts Lowell and the State University of New York at Geneseo. She was provost and vice president for academic affairs at Bridgewater State College. From 2008 to 2018, Kleniewski was president of the State University of New York at Oneonta. She was the first female in that role at Oneonta.

== Personal life ==
Kleniewski was raised in Rhode Island. She is married to Bill Davis. They moved to coastal Rhode Island after her retirement in 2018.

== Selected works ==
- Kleniewski, Nancy (1997). Cities, Change, and Conflict: A Political Economy of Urban Life. Wadsworth Publishing Company. ISBN 978-0-534-24775-1.
- Shannon, Thomas R.; Kleniewski, Nancy; Cross, William M. (1997). Urban Problems in Sociological Perspective. Waveland Press. ISBN 978-0-88133-959-8.
