= Lori Lite =

American writer

- Born: Lori Lite; 1961 (age 64–65)
- Education: State University of New York at Oneonta
- Occupation: Author
- Organization: Stress Free Kids
- Website: Official website

Lori Lite (born 1961) is an American author and founder of Stress Free Kids, working in the field of children's stress management. Lori has authored 11 books and a curriculum. She wrote and produced 9 Indigo Dreams CDs which encompass relaxation music for children, audio books for children, and guided instructional stress management for teens and adults. Her books have been translated into Japanese, Spanish, and Turkish.

== Works published ==
=== Books in English ===
- Angry Octopus: A Relaxation Story (2008) ISBN 978-0-98-362568-1
- Angry Octopus Coloring Book (2017) ISBN 978-1-93-798533-2
- Sea Otter Cove (2008) ISBN 978-1-93-798508-0
- Affirmation Weaver (2008) ISBN 978-0-98-362569-8
- Bubble Riding (2008) ISBN 978-1-93-798503-5
- The Goodnight Caterpillar (2004) ISBN 978-19-3798500-4
- A Boy and a Turtle (2012) ISBN 978-1-93-798513-4
- A Boy and a Bear (1996) ISBN 978-1-88-694107-6
- The Affirmation Web (1997) ISBN 978-1-88-694125-0
- Stress Free Kids Parent Guide (2013) ISBN 978-1-44-056751-3
- Stress Free Kids Curriculum (2011) ISBN 978-0-98-003289-5
- Stress Free Kids Bilingual Kit ISBN 978-1-93-798540-0

=== Books in Spanish ===
- El Pulpo Enojado (2012) ISBN 978-1-93-798501-1
- Caleta de Nutria Marina (2012) ISBN 978-1-93-798511-0
- Tejedor de Afimaciones (2012) ISBN 978-1-93-798502-8
- Montando Burbujas (2011) ISBN 978-1-93-798512-7
- Buenas Noches Oruga (2011) ISBN 978-1-93-798516-5
- El Niño y la Tortuga (2012) ISBN 978-1-93-798517-2

== CDs ==
- Indigo Dreams ISBN 978-0-97-086334-8
- Indigo Ocean Dreams ISBN 978-0-97-086336-2
- Sueños del Océano Índigo ISBN 978-1-93-798520-2
- Indigo Dreams: Garden of Wellness ISBN 978-0-97-877810-1
- Indigo Dreams 3-CD set ISBN 978-0-97-877819-4
- Indigo Teen Dreams ISBN 978-0-97-086339-3
- Indigo Teen Dreams 2-CD Set ISBN 978-0-98-362560-5
- Indigo Dreams: Adult Relaxation ISBN 978-0-97-086333-1
- Indigo Dreams: Kids Relaxation Music UPC 845121022124
- Indigo Dreams: Teen Relaxation Music UPC 845121022131
- Indigo Dreams: Kids Rainforest Relaxation Music UPC 845121027495
