= George William Thompson =

American lawyer

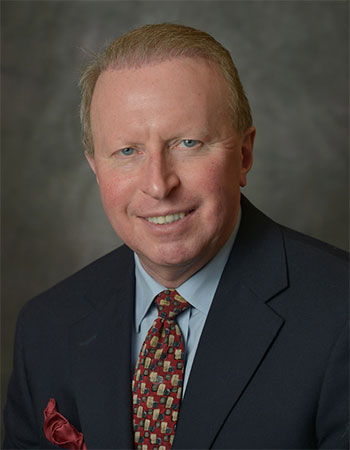
George W. Thompson

George William Thompson (born 1956) is an American international trade attorney, an adjunct professor at George Mason University Schar School of Policy and Government and a scholar on international trade. He currently runs the Washington, D.C. based firm Thompson and Associates, which specializes in international trade litigation.

== Education and career ==
Thompson attended the State University of New York (Oneonta) and graduated in 1978. He then attended the Cornell Law School and received the degree of Juris Doctor in 1981.

In 1987, Thompson became an Attorney Advisor in the General Counsel's Office of the U.S. International Trade Commission and litigated numerous cases on the commission's behalf during his six-year tenure. He was involved in litigating trade disputes: one with Canada over softwood lumber imports, one with Norway over the dumping of salmon in U.S. markets, and the investigations concerning Flat-Rolled Carbon Steel Products from numerous countries.

He is admitted to the following bars: State of New York, District of Columbia, United States Court of International Trade and Court of Appeals for the Federal Circuit.

== Author ==
Thompson has written and co-authored several publications regarding international trade issues.

- Transnational Contracts, Thomson-Reuters, 2011–2016. ISBN 9780379102000
- Intellectual Property Rights and United States International Trade Laws (Co-Author), Oxford, Oxford University Press, 2003 ISBN 9780379214383
- Exporting: Regulations, Documentation, Procedures (Co-Author), Global Training Center, 2015 ISBN 1-891249-45-2
- Managing Forwarders, Brokers & Carriers in Your International Supply Chain (Co-Author), Global Training Center, 2015. ISBN 1-891249-44-4
- Customs Law and Administration (Contributing Author). Thomson Reuters, 2011–2015. ISBN 9780379208023
- Judicial Review of International Trade Commission Determinations from October 1990 to September 1992 (Co-Author), International business Journal, v. 25, n. 1, Fall, 1993.
- Political and Policy Dimensions of Foreign Trade Zones (Co-Author), Vanderbilt Journal of Transnational Law. v. 18, 1987.
