= Scott Coffel =

American poet

Scott Coffel (born 1956) is an American poet. He was born in New York City and educated at York College, City University of New York, and at State University of New York at Oneonta. He graduated from Iowa Writers Workshop with an MFA in 1995. He directs the Hanson Center for Technical Communication at The University of Iowa.

His work has appeared in Missouri Review, Salmagundi, Paris Review, Ploughshares, the American Scholar, Prairie Schooner, the Southern Review and the Wallace Stevens Journal.

== Works ==
- "Double Indemnity"; "Andrei and Natasha" Waywiser
- "MEDIEVAL WOMEN"; "THE SYSTEM OF PTOLEMY", Adirondack Review
- "Tonight Wallace Stevens", Poetry Society of America
- Toucans in the Arctic, Etruscan Press, 2009, ISBN 978-0-9797450-7-2
- Shivering believer, University of Iowa, 1995

=== Anthologies ===
- "God's Double"; "Mountain Jews", The Prairie schooner anthology of contemporary Jewish American writing, editor Hilda Raz, University of Nebraska Press, 1998, ISBN 978-0-8032-8971-0
