= Caryl M. Stern =

American philanthropy executive, civil and human rights activist, child advocate, author

Caryl Stern
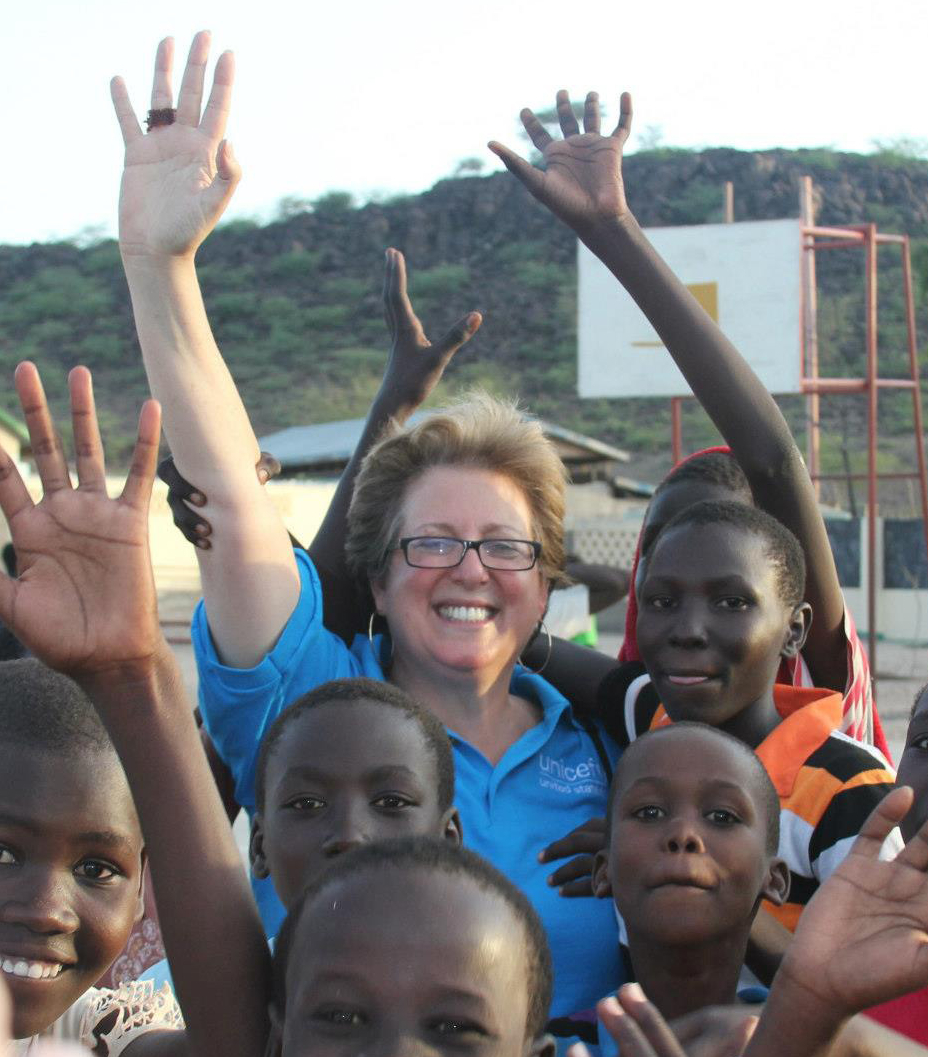
- Born: October 30, 1957 (age 67); Westchester County, New York, U.S.
- Education: State University of New York, Oneonta (BA); Western Illinois University (MA); Loyola University Chicago
- Known for: U.S. Fund for UNICEF, child advocacy, human rights advocacy

Caryl M. Stern (born October 30, 1957) is an American author, child advocate, civil and human rights activist, and non-profit executive.

== Early life ==
Stern was born to Edwin and Manuela Stern in Westchester County, New York. She has one sibling, her brother, Dr. Mitchell Stern.

Stern graduated from high school at age 16 and went on to receive her bachelor's degree at the State University of New York at Oneonta, when she was 20. She received her master's degree at Western Illinois University and pursued a doctorate in education at Loyola University Chicago.

In her early career, Stern served in several leadership positions at Polytechnic University in Brooklyn, New York, including dean of students from 1985 to 1987.

== Anti-Defamation League ==
In 1987, Stern took a post with the Anti-Defamation League (ADL). There she headed A World of Difference, a diversity training and anti-bias project. Stern was later promoted to director of the education division at the ADL and eventually chief operating officer (COO) and senior associate national director of the organization.

In 2006, she left the ADL for the U.S. Fund for UNICEF, the oldest of the 36 national committees that support the United Nations Children's Fund (UNICEF) and collectively raise about one-third of its annual income.

== U.S. Fund for UNICEF ==
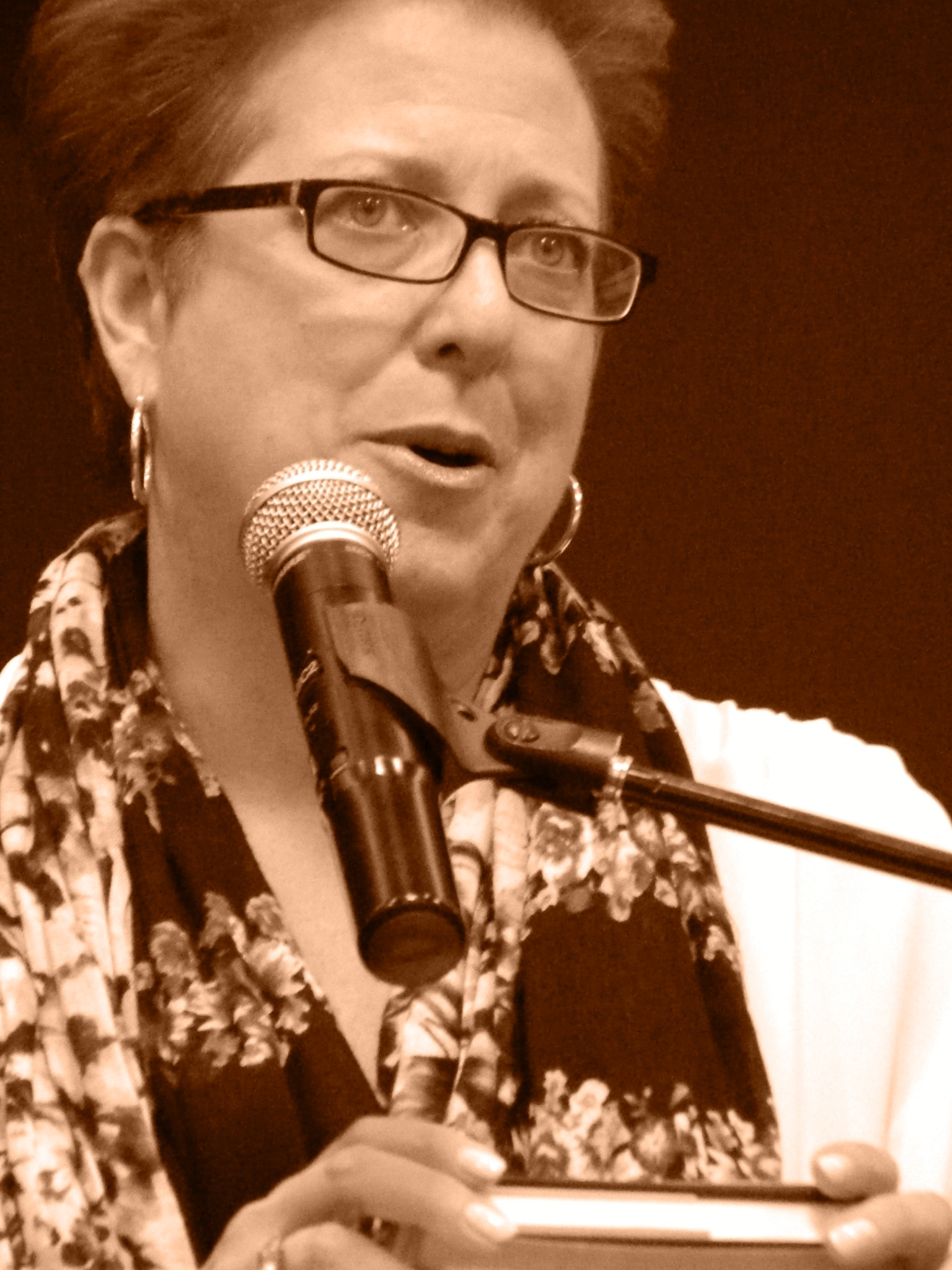
Stern in 2013

Stern joined the U.S. Fund for UNICEF in 2006 as COO and served as acting president for a short time before assuming the role of president and CEO in May 2007. In this role, she advocated for continued U.S. Government support of UNICEF and headed the organization's efforts to raise awareness and revenue for UNICEF's efforts to aid children affected by disasters including the 2010 Haiti earthquake, the 2011 East Africa drought, and the current Ebola crisis. During her tenure, the U.S. Fund's revenues have increased from $372,131,340 in FY 2007 to $606,869,535 in FY 2014.

== Walton Family Foundation ==
Stern was announced as Executive Director for the Walton Family Foundation in September 2019. She will start in the position in January 2020. She'll head the non-profit that, in 2018, awarded nearly $600 million in grants for various charitable causes.

== Personal ==
Stern is married to real estate developer Donald LaRosa. They have three sons. Stern's compensation as president and CEO of the U.S. Fund for UNICEF is $521,820.

== Books and publications ==
Stern is the co-author of Hate Hurts: How Children Learn and Unlearn Prejudice and Future Perfect: A Model for Professional Development. I Believe in Zero: Learning from the World's Children, a collection of Stern's accounts from areas affected by crisis, war, and disaster was published in 2013.
