= Pamela Robey =

American cell biologist

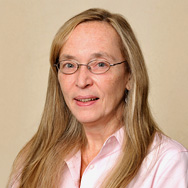
- Education: Susquehanna University (B.A.); Catholic University of America (M.S., Ph.D.)
- Scientific career
- Fields: Skeletal cell biology
- Workplaces: National Institute of Dental and Craniofacial Research
- Thesis: Studies on the Collagenous Component of a Tumor Basement Membrane (1979)

Pamela Gehron Robey (born 1952) is an American cell biologist. She is a senior investigator in the skeletal biology section at the National Institute of Dental and Craniofacial Research.

== Education ==
Robey received her B.A. in biology from Susquehanna University in 1974. She completed a M.S. in biochemistry in 1977 and a Ph.D. in cell biology in 1979 from the Catholic University of America. Her Master's graduate thesis was titled The isolation, purification and characterization of A/J skin collagen and the effects of dexamethasone on skin collegen metabolism. Her 1979 dissertation was titled Studies on the Collagenous Component of a Tumor Basement Membrane. She did her post-doctoral work at the National Institute of Arthritis, Metabolism and Digestive Diseases on the role of defective phosphorylation of enzymes leading to lysosomal storage disease, and a staff fellowship in the National Eye Institute, where she studied retinal and ocular connective tissue diseases.

== Career ==
Robey joined NIDCR in 1983 and established reproducible methods for culturing human bone-forming cells, in order to study the development of mineralized matrix formation. In 1992, Robey was appointed chief of Skeletal Biology Section. Robey has served as a co-coordinator of the NIH Bone Marrow Stromal Cell Transplantation Center (2008-2013), and is currently the acting Scientific Director of the NIH Stem Cell Characterization Facility. She is a senior investigator in the skeletal biology section at NIDCR. In early 2000s, she discovered dental stem cells.

=== Research interests ===
Robey focuses on four main areas in skeletal cell biology: 1) determination of the characteristics and the biological properties of post-natal bone marrow stromal cells (BMSCs), a subset of which are multipotent skeletal stem cells (SSCs), able to recreate cartilage, bone, cells that support blood formation and fat cells in the marrow; 2) elucidation of the role of enzymatic matrix remodeling in the maintenance of SSC function; 3) characterization of the role that BMSCs/SSCs play in skeletal diseases; and, 4) development of techniques for cartilage and bone regeneration in human patients with skeletal defects. In addition to using BMSCs for tissue engineering, Dr. Robey and her group also explore the potential of pluripotent stem cells to differentiate into cartilage and bone as another source of cells for skeletal regeneration.
