= Charles W. Hunt (educator) =

American educator and administrator

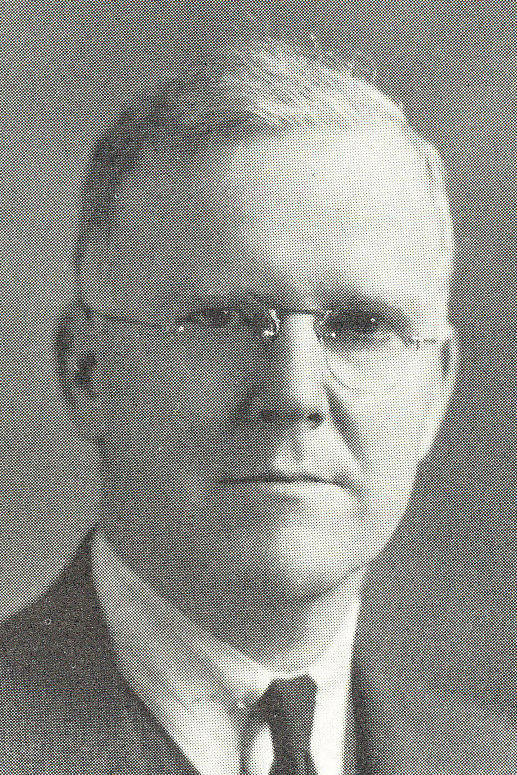

3rd President of the State University of New York at Oneonta
- In office 1933–1951
- Preceded by: Percy I. Bugbee
- Succeeded by: Royal F. Netzer

Personal details
- Born: Charles Wesley Hunt; October 20, 1880 Charlestown, New Hampshire
- Died: September 3, 1973 (aged 92) Oneonta, New York
- Children: 4
- Education: Brown University; Columbia University

Charles Wesley Hunt (1880–1973) was an American educator and academic administrator. He served as the 3rd President of the State University of New York at Oneonta. During his tenure as president, the college transitioned from being known as Oneonta State Normal School to Oneonta State Teachers College. The Hunt Union building on the SUNY Oneonta campus is named in his honor, as well as some of the school-sponsored comedy events being called "Chuck's Comedy Club".

Hunt was born on October 20, 1880, in Charlestown, New Hampshire. He attended school in Saxtons River, Vermont, and went on to attend Brown University and Columbia University.

After graduation, Hunt taught in Saxtons River and Providence. He was the principal of a school in Briarcliff Manor, New York. Hunt served in a variety of academic roles at universities including Columbia University, the University of Pittsburgh, and Case Western Reserve University.

Hunt became principal of the Oneonta Normal School in 1933. When the institution became a four-year college in 1938, Hunt became the first individual to be named president of the college. During Hunt's tenure as president, he was instrumental in convincing local government leaders to invest in acreage to expand the campus. Under Hunt's leadership, the quality of campus life increased, socially and academically. The faculty to student ratio was reduced, the library was expanded, and salaries were raised for employees. Hunt would leave this role in 1951.

Hunt died on September 3, 1973, at the age of 92.

On October 13, 1973, the College Union Building was dedicated to Hunt and named in his honor.
