= Ian MacMillan (author) =

American writer (1941–2008)

- Born: Ian T. MacMillan; March 23, 1941
- Died: December 18, 2008 (aged 67)
- Education: State University of New York at Oneonta; University of Iowa
- Occupations: Scholar; novelist

Ian T. MacMillan (March 23, 1941 – December 18, 2008) was a Hawaii-based scholar and novelist. From 1966 to 2008 he was a professor of English at the University of Hawaiʻi at Mānoa. The author of eight novels and six short story collections, MacMillan founded the literary journal Hawaii Review in 1973. Beginning in 1992, he also served as the fiction editor for Manoa: A Pacific Journal of International Writing. His work was anthologized in The Best American Short Stories and The Best of Triquarterly.

MacMillan was a graduate of the State University of New York at Oneonta and the University of Iowa.

Called "the Stephen Crane of World War II" by Kurt Vonnegut, MacMillan was the recipient of a number of literary awards, including the Hawaii Award for Literature in 1992, the O. Henry Award, the Elliot Cades Award for Literature in 2007, and the Pushcart Prize. He was further honored in 2010 by the creation of the Ian MacMillan Writing Awards in his memory at the University of Hawaii. His novel Village of a Million Spirits received the PEN Center USA Award for Fiction in 2000.

== Bibliography ==
- Light and Power: Stories (1980)
- Blakely's Ark (1981)
- Proud Monster (1988)
- Orbit of Darkness (1991)
- Exiles from Time: Stories of Hawaii (1998)
- Squid Eye (1999)
- The Red Wind (1999)
- Village of a Million Spirits: A Novel of the Treblinka Uprising (1999)
- Ullambana and Other Stories of Hawaii (2002)
- The Braid (2005)
- The Seven Orchids (2005)
- Our People: Stories (2008)
- The Bone Hook (2009)
- In the Time Before Light (2010)
