= Hope Network =

Non-profit Christian organization in Michigan

Hope Network is a non-profit Christian organization in Michigan that helps people with disabilities live independently. Hope Network provides services for people with brain injury, spinal cord injury, mental illness, developmental disabilities, drug and alcohol addictions, and other disadvantages. Hope Network also provides transportation, low-income housing and job training.

Hope Network was founded by Herbert A. Start. In the early 1970s the organization opened two community-based centers in Grand Rapids, Michigan, then added its first residential program in 1976. By 2002, it operated 190 locations through seven major affiliates in the state.
