= Diene Keita =

United Nations official (born 1964)

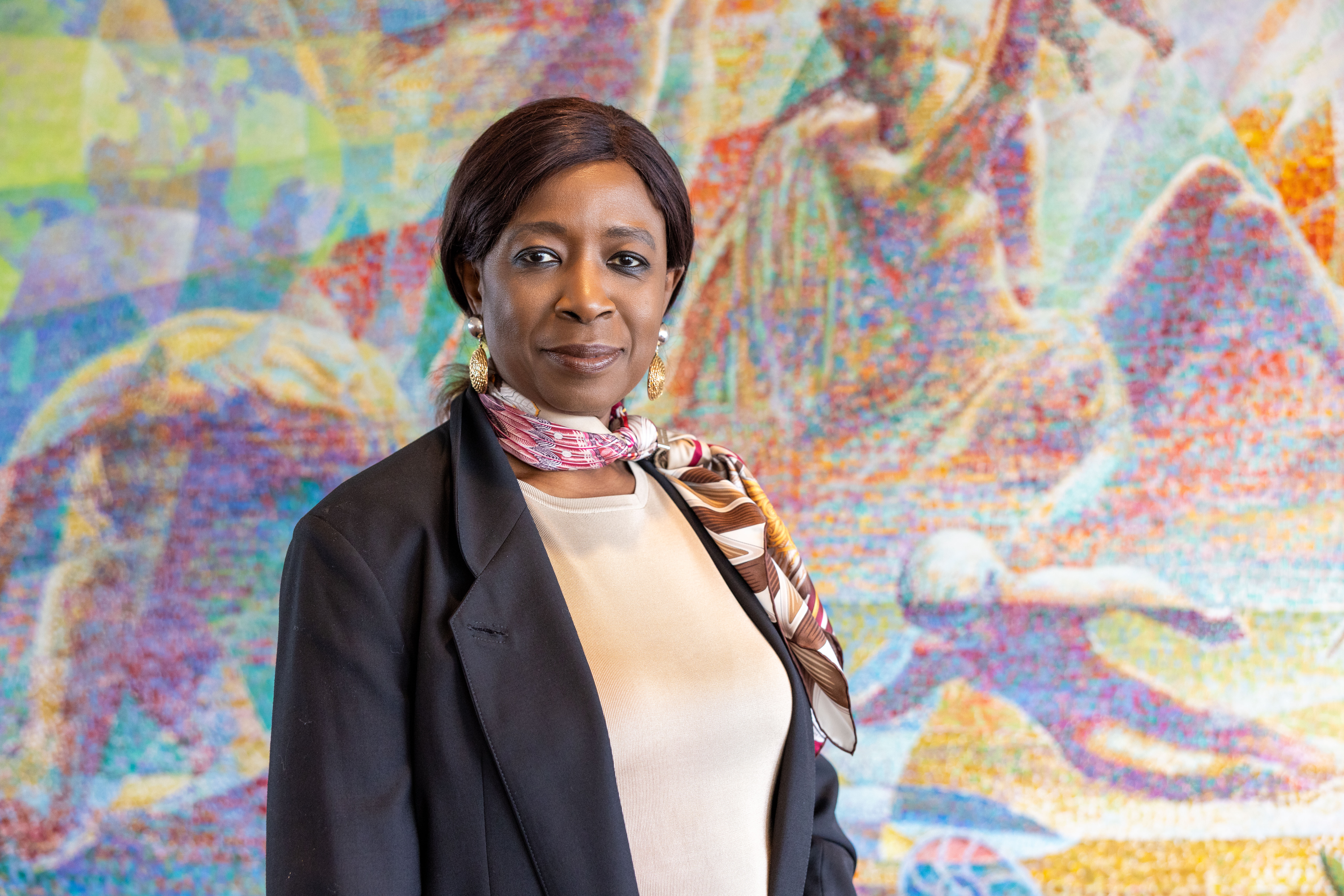
Keita in 2026

Diene Keita (born 19 August 1964) is a Guinean politician and global development leader currently serving as the Executive Director of UNFPA, the United Nations Population Fund. She was appointed to this position by Secretary-General of the United Nations, António Guterres in August 2025, having previously served as Deputy Executive Director for programmes for UNFPA from June 2020. She is the first citizen of Guinea to head a UN agency.

== Early life and education ==
Keita was born on 19 August 1964 in Guinea. She holds a doctorate in law from Sorbonne University in Paris, where she graduated summa cum laude. She also holds a Diploma in Advanced Studies in international economics and development law from Rene Descartes University, Paris, and a master's degree in economic and social administration.

== Career ==
=== United Nations Development Programme ===
Keita began her United Nations career in 1990 with the United Nations Development Programme in New York City as a Programme Officer, and from this point, held various successful programmatic leadership positions at the country level, serving as UNDP Deputy Representative and Acting Representative for several years. In 2006, she was UNDP Representative to the African Union and to the United Nations Economic Commission for Africa, Ethiopia.

=== United Nations Population Fund ===
Keita joined UNFPA in 2006 as a Representative in Mauritania, and thereafter served in representative positions in Benin, the Democratic Republic of the Congo and Nigeria. During this time, she successfully oversaw some of UNFPA's largest programmes, expanded strategic partnerships and mobilized critical resources to support the delivery of UNFPA’s work. While serving with UNFPA, Keita also acted as United Nations Resident Coordinator in Mauritania, Benin and the Democratic Republic of the Congo.

From 2020 to 2025, she held the position of United Nations Assistant Secretary-General and Deputy Executive Director for programmes. In these roles, she oversaw UNFPA’s global programme portfolio.

=== Minister of International Cooperation and African Integration ===
Between 2018 and 2020, Keita served as the Minister for Cooperation and African Integration for Guinea. In this role, she mobilized resources from external and domestic partners, and strengthened the collaboration between Guinea and other African countries, including member states of ECOWAS.

She also successfully built partnerships with the private sector, ensuring that all local undertakings met the requirements of the Sustainable Development Goals and the African Union’s Agenda 2063, while keeping in line with national policies. Similarly, she built strategic partnerships with the World Bank, the United Nations system, USAID, UN Member States, private foundations such as Bill and Melinda Gates Foundation and the Global Fund, and multinational companies.

=== Honours and awards ===
Keita was awarded the Commander of the Order of National Merit, a National Award of the Mauritanian Government. She was also conferred the Commander of the National Order, awarded by the Republic of Benin.

== Publications ==
Keita has co-authored three publications:

- Africa and the Millennium Development Goals ch8: the role of National Stakeholders & their Priorities for achieving the MDGs in Sub-Saharan Africa. Economica, 2004.
- Africa and the Challenges of Governance. Ch6: Gender & governance priorities - Maisonneuve – Larose, 2008.
- The Social and Cultural Barriers to the popularization of Family Planning and to better Maternal Health in Benin – Espérance, 2014.
