= Hispanic Association of Colleges and Universities =

American nonprofit organization

- Abbreviation: HACU
- Formation: 1986; 40 years ago
- Type: Education advocacy association
- Headquarters: United States
- Region served: United States, Puerto Rico, Latin America, Spain
- Members: 500+ colleges and universities
- Website: www.hacu.net

The Hispanic Association of Colleges and Universities (HACU) is a nonprofit organization dedicated to promoting Hispanic student success in higher education. Founded in 1986 with an initial membership of eighteen institutions, HACU has since grown into a network of more than 500 colleges and universities across the United States, Puerto Rico, Latin America, Spain, and select U.S. school districts. (Note: As of 2003, "HACU represents close to 300 academic institutions in the United States, Puerto Rico, and abroad. HACU member institutions serve close to two-thirds of Hispanic college students in the United States.")

HACU is the only national association that represents Hispanic-Serving Institutions (HSIs). Its U.S. member institutions, while comprising just 17% of all higher education institutions, enroll approximately two-thirds of all Hispanic college students in the country.

== Mission and activities ==
HACU’s mission is to champion Hispanic success in higher education. Its work includes:

- Advocating for improved federal and state policies and funding to support HSIs.
- Building the institutional capacity of member schools through research, technical assistance, and professional development.
- Developing strategic partnerships with corporate, government, and international organizations.
- Supporting the Hispanic education pipeline from early childhood through graduate education and into the workforce.

HACU is governed by a Board of Directors composed primarily of leaders from Hispanic-Serving Institutions.

== Membership ==
HACU’s membership includes:

- Over 470 U.S.-based institutions, including four-year universities and community colleges
- Approximately 45 international institutions across Latin America and Spain
- U.S. school district affiliates focused on K–12 to college pathways

== Hispanic higher education ==
According to HACU and U.S. government data:

- As of 2017, there were 59.1 million Hispanics in the U.S., representing 18.2% of the population.
- The median age for Hispanics was 29.0, compared to 37.9 for the total population.
- Hispanic buying power in 2016 was estimated at $1.4 trillion, with projections reaching $1.7 trillion by 2020.
- In 2016, 3.29 million Hispanics were enrolled in non-profit higher education institutions, including those in Puerto Rico.
- 46.0% of Hispanic undergraduates attended two-year colleges (compared to 36.6% of all undergraduates).

Despite increased enrollment, disparities remain in academic attainment:

- 29.5% of Hispanics aged 25+ had not completed high school as of 2017.
- Only 17.2% held a bachelor’s degree or higher, compared to 38.1% of non-Hispanic whites.

== Partnerships and impact ==
HACU has played a role in shaping national education policy related to HSIs and in securing federal investments for programs that serve Hispanic and underserved student populations. The association is widely regarded as the leading voice on Hispanic higher education in the United States.

Its member institutions include both public and private universities, community colleges, and emerging HSIs. Institutions such as California State University, San Bernardino have been long-standing members.

== See also ==
- Hispanic-Serving Institution
- Association of American Colleges and Universities
