= Margaret R. Yocom =

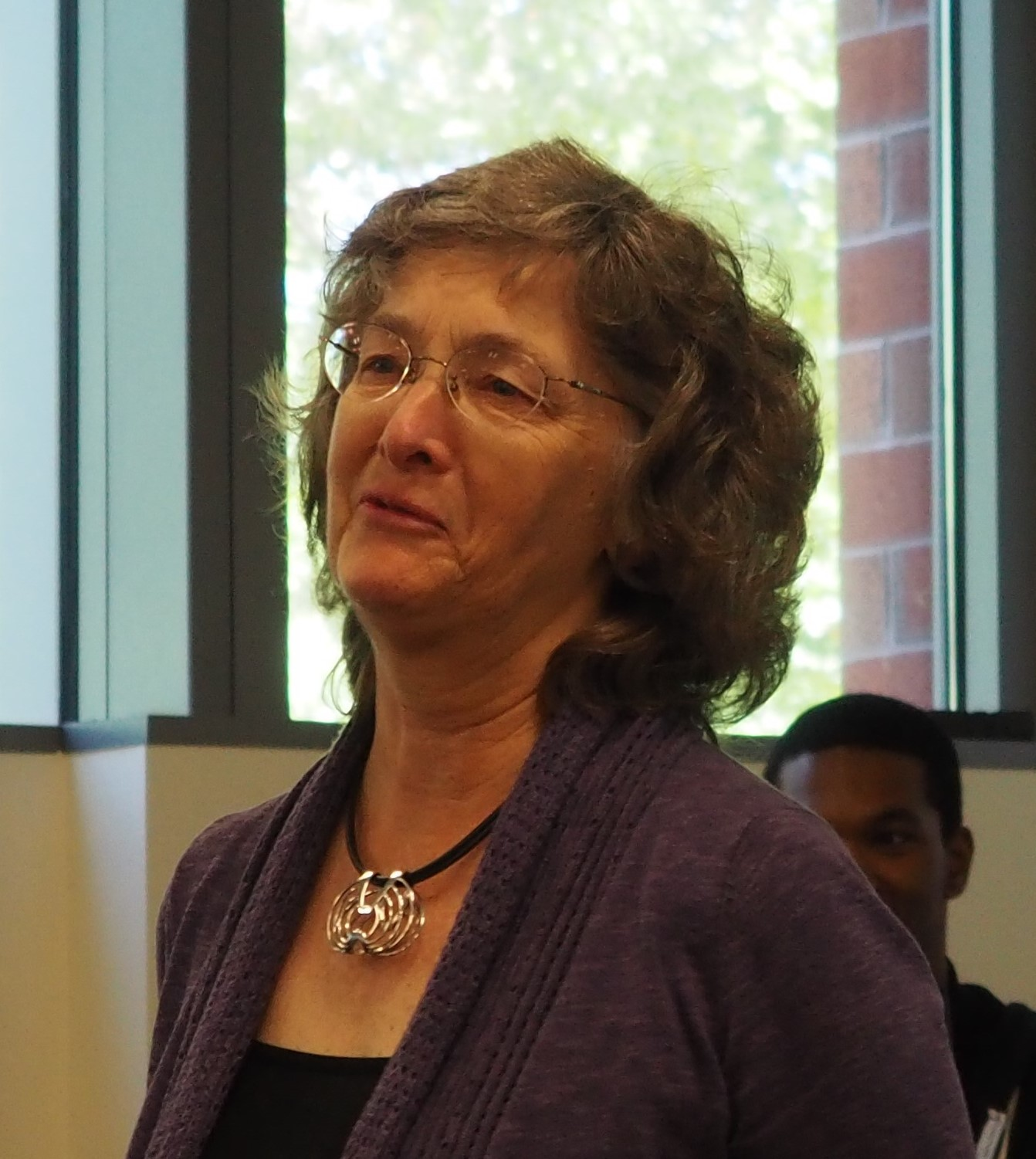
- Born: Pottstown, Pennsylvania

Academic background
- Education: Pennsylvania State University, University of Massachusetts Amherst

Academic work
- Discipline: English
- Sub-discipline: Folklore
- Institutions: Smithsonian Institution, George Mason University

Margaret R. Yocom is a folklorist and poet. Now emerita, she taught at George Mason University from 1977 to 2013 and founded the Folklore Studies Program there. She works in Maine.

== Early life and education ==
Born in Pottstown, Pennsylvania, United States, the eldest child of Betty Keck and Norman Davidheiser Yocom, she first pursued her interest in folklore at Pennsylvania State University where she majored in English (BA, 1970). She went on to University of Massachusetts Amherst (U Mass) where she completed an MA in English and then a PhD in English (1980) with a concentration in Folklore. While at U Mass, she wrote her dissertation on family folklore, choosing to work with her own Pennsylvania German, Swiss, and Danish family. Together with other folklorists working in family folklore such as Steve Zeitlin, Karen Baldwin, and Marilyn White, Yocom helped develop this new ethnographic field of study. As she was finishing her academic studies, she worked for the Smithsonian Institution's Festival of American Folklife, and was the field research coordinator for the Northeast and Mid-Atlantic regions of the 1976 Bicentennial festival. She continued to be a presenter at subsequent festivals until 1988, when she began working summers in Maine.

== Academic career ==
In 1977, Yocom accepted a job offer at George Mason University in Virginia. She has created a Folklore Studies program that includes a Folklore, Mythology and Literature concentration for undergraduates in the Department of English, a Folklore and Mythology Minor in the College of Humanities and Social Sciences, a Graduate Certificate in Folklore Studies (Dept. of English), and a Folklore Concentration in the Master of Arts in Interdisciplinary Studies.

During her fieldwork for the Folklife Festival in 1975, Yocom spotted a photograph in an arts festival reject pile that led her to what would become her major field research site. The man in the photograph was Rodney Richard Sr., a Maine wood carver and community scholar. Yocom has written and continues to write about the Richard family of loggers and woodcarvers, homemakers and knitters in the western mountains of Maine. Her interest lies in many facets of Maine culture but especially in wood carving, textile arts, and traditional narratives. Of her experience in Maine she says: "I like the idea of accompanying people: working for a long time in a field area and getting to know them. The context is wide and deep and Rangeley is an area that I just fell in love with."

== Work with folklore ==
Since 1986 she has been folklorist and curator for the Rangeley Lakes Region Logging Museum founded by Rodney Richard. She has been on the board of directors since 1996. She also volunteers for the Rangeley Lakes Region Historical Society and has been a presenter for various New England folk festivals.

In 1983 she accepted a job with Kawerak, the non-profit arm of the Bering Straits Native Corporation in Nome, Alaska, where she was the folklorist of the Eskimo Heritage Program. From 1983 to 1985, she worked with King Island Inuit community members as well as linguist Lawrence Kaplan of the University of Alaska, produce the first bi-lingual book in English and Inupiaq called Ugiuvangmiut Qualiapyuit: King Island Tales.

Long interested in feminist folklore, Yocom published an essay in the first book on women's folklore, Women's Folklore Women's Culture, edited by Susan Kalcik and Rosan Jordan. Published in 1985, the book is a collection of papers presented at the American Folklore Society in some of the first panels specifically about women and folklore. Another of her essays appears in the book Feminist Messages, edited by folklorist Joan Radner.

In 2002 Yocom and Amy Skillman founded the Folklore and Creative Writing section of the American Folklore Society. This section came out of Yocom's folklore and creative writing classes at GMU and her poetry. The Folklore and Creative Writing section now sponsors several panels, forums, and readings at the Annual Meeting of the American Folklore Society. One of its members, Frank de Caro, published an anthology of folklorists' creative writing: The Folklore Muse (Utah State University Press, 2008). Of the merging of creative writing and folklore she says, "It makes sense: as ethnographers, we write and we are co-creators of these texts that we put on paper."

Throughout her career she has maintained the Folklore Studies Program by introducing new courses, hiring a second folklorist, and working to keep the program a vital part of the Department of English at George Mason University (GMU). Of her work at GMU, she states, "To show a student who belongs in this discipline of Folklore—here it is, and you can do this. That's all I want...I'm not looking for a particular number of students but to make that one person who belongs in Folklore aware that folklore is there. If I set out to do anything, it was that."
