= Museum folklore =

Domain of scholarship and professional practice within the field of folklore studies

Museum folklore is a domain of scholarship and professional practice within the field of folklore studies (folkloristics).

== Characteristics ==
Some museum folklorists work full-time in museums of ethnography, ethnology, cultural history, or folk art, often as educators, curators, and directors. Others work in other settings, such as in public folklore programs, academic departments, community-based organizations, and consultancies. Such folklorists either partner with museums in the development of scholarly and public programs or study the history and impact of such work.

Key themes in museum folklore include policies and practices relating to tangible and intangible cultural heritage, museums as sites of conscience, museums and cultural tourism, and museums as sites of innovation relative to the digital preservation, presentation, and access to cultural heritage collections. Museum folklore practice has often focused on ways of animating the object-centered nature of the museum through events and activities that bring the people behind heritage collections into engagement with museum audiences, as through such activities as museum-based artist in residency programs, folk festivals, and art and craft sales markets.

There is significant interaction and overlap between museum folklore and the neighboring field of museum anthropology, as well as the interdisciplinary field of material culture studies. Museum folklore is often understood as a sub-area of the wider realm of public folklore. In North America, the historical connections linking anthropology and folklore studies more broadly are of particular relevance to museum folklorists because many early leaders of the American folklore society were also anthropologists active in museums. In Europe, what is here referred to as museum folklore would often fall within the field of European ethnology. Museum folklore is also often understood as part of the sub-field of folklife studies.

== Organizations ==
An organizational home for the sub-field in the United States and Canada is the Folklore and Museums section of the American Folklore Society. Among folklorists, this section is cognate to the Council for Museum Anthropology among museum anthropologists.

== Important persons ==
Prominent figures in the history of museum folklore include:

- William Bascom (1912-1981)
- Franz Boas (1858-1942)
- William N. Fenton (1908-2005)
- Stewart Culin (1858-1929)
- Artur Hazelius (1833-1901)

Leading senior scholar-practitioners in the field today include Marsha Bol, C. Kurt Dewhurst, Rayna Green, Barbara Kirshenblatt-Gimblett, and Marsha MacDowell.
