= Dorothy Noyes =

American folklorist and ethnologist

Dorothy Noyes is an American folklorist and ethnologist whose comparative, ethnographic and historical research focuses on European societies and upon European immigrant communities in the United States. Beyond its area studies context, her work has aimed to enrich the conceptual toolkit of folklore studies (folkloristics) and ethnology. General problems upon which she has focused attention include the status of "provincial" communities in national and global contexts, heritage policies and politics, problems of innovation and creativity, and the nature of festival specifically and of cultural displays and representations generally.

== Career ==
On the faculty of The Ohio State University, Noyes is a professor affiliated with the Departments of English, Comparative Studies, and Anthropology. She has served as the director of the Center for Folklore Studies (2005-2014) and is affiliated with the Mershon Center for International Security Studies. In 2021, she was named an Arts and Sciences Distinguished Professor. She earned her B.A. in English at Indiana University Bloomington (1983) and her M.A (1987) and Ph.D. (1992) degrees in the Department of Folklore and Folklife at the University of Pennsylvania. At Penn, her doctoral advisor was Roger D. Abrahams. She is particularly well known for her studies of Catalonia and for her concurrent engagement with the historical, literary, and anthropological orientations that characterize the field of folklore studies (folkloristics).

She has served on the executive board of the American Folklore Society and presently serves on the executive board of the Société Internationale d'Ethnologie et de Folklore. She served as president of the American Folklore Society for 2018 and 2019.

The author of numbers works, her 2003 book Fire in the Plaça: Catalan Festival Politics After Franco won the 2005 Book Prize of the Fellows of the American Folklore Society.

She has been a Princeton University Fellow at the Shelby Cullom Davis Center for Historical Studies and has taught as a visitor at Indiana University, the University of Pennsylvania, New York University, Universitat de Barcelona, and Georg-August-Universität Göttingen. She is a Fellow of the American Folklore Society and doctor honoris causa of the University of Tartu.

== Representative works ==
=== Books ===
- (with Regina Bendix and Kilian Bizer) Sustaining Interdisciplinary Collaboration: A Guide for the Academy. Champaign: University of Illinois Press. UI Press | Regina F. Bendix, Kilian Bizer, and Dorothy Noyes | Sustaining Interdisciplinary Collaboration: A Guide for the Academy (2017)
- Humble Theory: Folklore's Grasp on Social Life. Bloomington: Indiana University Press. Humble theory: folklore's grasp on social life (2016)
- Fire in the Plaça: Catalan Festival Politics After Franco. Philadelphia: University of Pennsylvania Press. Fire in the plaça: Catalan festival politics after Franco (2003)
- The Uses of Tradition: Arts of Italian Americans in Philadelphia. Philadelphia: Philadelphia Folklore Project and Samuel S. Fleisher Art Memorial. Uses of tradition: arts of Italian Americans in Philadelphia (1989)

=== Articles ===
- "The Judgment of Solomon: Global Protections for Tradition and the Problem of Community Ownership." Cultural Analysis. 5 (2006): pages 27-56. Socrates and Berkeley Scholars Web Hosting Services Have Been Retired | Web Platform Services
- "Folklore." In The Social Science Encyclopedia. 3rd ed. Adam Kuper and Jessica Kuper, eds. pages 375–378. New York: Routledge, 2004.
- "Group." In Eight Words for the Study of Expressive Culture. Burt Feintuch, ed. Pages 7–41. Urbana: University of Illinois Press, 2003. Eight words for the study of expressive culture
- "La Maja Vestida: Dress as Resistance to Enlightenment in Late-18th-Century Madrid." Journal of American Folklore. 111(1998): pages 197-217.
