= Don Yoder =

American folklorist (1921–2015)

- Born: August 27, 1921; Altoona, Pennsylvania
- Died: August 11, 2015 (aged 93)
- Occupation: Folklorist

Don Yoder (August 27, 1921– August 11, 2015) was an American folklorist specializing in the study of Pennsylvania Dutch, Quaker, Amish, and other Anabaptist folklife in Pennsylvania. A professor and professor emeritus at the University of Pennsylvania, he specialized in religious folklife and the study of belief. He is known for his teaching, collecting, field trips, recording, lectures, and books. He also co-founded a folk festival in Pennsylvania, which is the USA's oldest continual annual folklife festival, and is credited with "bringing the idea of "folklife" to the United States".

== Early life and education ==
Yoder was born in Altoona, Pennsylvania. He was the ninth generation of a Pennsylvania German lineage. Yoder graduated with a B.A. in history from Franklin and Marshall College in 1942. He received a Ph.D. in American church history from the University of Chicago in 1947.

== Academic career ==
He taught at the Union Theological Seminary in New York (1946–1948), Muhlenberg College (1948–1949), Franklin and Marshall College (1949–1956), and the University of Pennsylvania (1956–1996). At Franklin and Marshall, he co-founded – with Dr. Alfred Shoemaker and Dr. William Frey – the Pennsylvania Dutch Folklore Center and the journal The Pennsylvania Dutchman. In 1950, Yoder, Shoemaker and Frey founded the Pennsylvania Dutch Folk Festival – later the Kutztown Folk Festival. This was the oldest continuously operated annual folklife festival in the United States.

At the festival, Yoder and his colleagues aimed to showcase an entire way of life rather than just the expressive culture of a community (as other American folk festivals did). Taking inspiration from scholarship and museum practice in Germany and particularly Scandinavia (Volkskunde), they used the term "folklife" – distinguished from "folklore" – to describe this all-encompassing view.

In 1956, Yoder joined the University of Pennsylvania. Yoder was key to the creation of the university's Department of Folklore and Folklife, where his colleagues included MacEdward Leach (whom he took over from as Head of department in 1966), Dell Hymes, Henry Glassie, Barbara Kirshenblatt-Gimblett, John Szwed, Roger Abrahams, Dan Ben-Amos, Kenneth S. Goldstein, Margaret Mills, and Regina Bendix (and Anthony F.C. Wallace and Ward Goodenough who were in the Department of Anthropology). He was a fellow and former president of the American Folklore Society.

Yoder wrote about many aspects of folklife studies, specializing in religion, religious music, Fraktur, foodways, costume, and other material culture. His books, especially American Folklife (1976) and Discovering American Folklife (1990) and his articles on folklife studies in the 1960s and 1970s are seminal texts in the field of folkloristics. He co-founded the Pennsylvania Folklife Society in 1949. He served as editor of the journal, Pennsylvania Folklife, for many years. In 1951 he was scheduled to lead a 46-day tour of Europe offered through Franklin and Marshall College. He also regularly conducted research in Europe, especially Germany and Switzerland, the ancestral homelands of many Pennsylvania cultures.

== Affiliations ==
Yoder served as president of the American Folklore Society in 1981. An annual lecture at the Society is named in his honor as well as a graduate award.

Yoder was influential in the creation of the American Folklife Center. In 1970, Yoder was one of the witness before Congress as part of the hearings examining the concept of an American Folklife Foundation, where he testified in favor of such a foundation. When the American Folklife Center was founded six years later, Yoder was named as one of its original trustees.

== Collections ==
The University of North Carolina has a Don Yoder Collection of American Hymnody. His art and ephemera collection is now housed in the library at Cabrini University. He and his cousin William Woys Weaver donated much of their Roughwood Collection of Pennsylvania German materials to Kutztown University. Further materials are held by the Library Company of Philadelphia and the Library of Congress.

== Selected publications ==
- Yoder, Don (1961). Pennsylvania Spirituals. Lancaster: Pennsylvania Folklife Society. OCLC 937086273.
- Yoder, Don (1968). 'Foreword' to Johnson, Guy Benton (1968) Folk Culture on St. Helena Island, South Carolina, Hatboro, Pa.: Folklore Associates. OCLC 306572
- Yoder, Don (1972). "Folk Cookery," "Folk Costume," and "Folk Medicine" in Folklore and Folklife: An Introduction (ed. Richard Dorson). Chicago: University of Chicago Press. OCLC 977474824.
- Yoder, Don (1976). American Folklife. London : University of Texas Press. ISBN 978-0-292-72907-0. OCLC 785335371
- Yoder, Don (1980). Pennsylvania German Immigrants, 1709–1786: Lists Consolidated from Yearbooks of the Pennsylvania German Folklore Society, Genealogical Publishing Company. ISBN 978-0-8063-0892-0. OCLC 951905290.
- Yoder, Don (1990). The Picture-Bible of Ludwig Denig; a Pennsylvania German Emblem Book. New York, N.Y.: Hudson Hills Press in association with the Museum of American Folk Art and the Pennsylvania German Society: Distributed in the United States ... by Rizzoli International Publications. ISBN 978-1-55595-034-7. OCLC 19624806.
- Yoder, Don (1990). Discovering American folklife: studies in ethnic, religious, and regional culture. Ann Arbor.: UMI Research Press. ISBN 978-0-8357-1973-5. OCLC 243442261
- Yoder, Don and Graves, Thomas E. (2000) Hex Signs: Pennsylvania Dutch Barn Symbols & Their Meanings. New York: E.P. Dutton. ISBN 978-0-525-24466-0. OCLC 19824543.
- Yoder, Don (2003). Groundhog Day. Mechanicsburg, Pa.: Stackpole. ISBN 978-0-8117-0029-0. OCLC 52542605
- Yoder, Don (2005). The Pennsylvania German broadside: a history and guide. University Park, PA: Penn State University Press for the Library Co. of Philadelphia and the Pennsylvania German Society. ISBN 978-0-271-02679-4. OCLC 58807375
