= Köngäs =

Köngäs is a Finnish surname.

== Geographical distribution ==
As of 2014, 89.6% of all known bearers of the surname Köngäs were residents of Finland (frequency 1:25,448) and 10.4% of Sweden (1:393,870).

In Finland, the frequency of the surname was higher than national average (1:25,448) in the following regions:

1. Lapland (1:1,533)
2. Kainuu (1:17,921)
3. Päijänne Tavastia (1:21,660)

== People ==
- Elli Köngäs-Maranda (1932–1982), née Köngäs, Finnish anthropologist
- Mika Köngäs (born 1993), Finnish badminton player
