= Amy Skillman =

American folklorist

Amy Skillman is an American folklorist and scholar. She is president of the American Folklore Society (AFS).

== Career ==
Skillman completed a self-designed B.A. in cultural minorities and the immigrant experience from St. Lawrence University. She earned a M.A. in folklore from University of California, Los Angeles.

Skillman worked as Pennsylvania's state folklorist for over thirty years, managing the state folk arts infrastructure program for the Pennsylvania Council on the Arts.

Skillman has served as the academic director of the M.A. in cultural sustainability at Goucher College since 2012. In 2023, she was elected president of the American Folklore Society (AFS). She became involved with the AFS in 1978 and served on its executive board from 2009 to 2011. She is an AFS fellow and a recipient of the Botkin Prize.
