= Michael Ann Williams =

American folklorist (born 1953)

Michael Ann Williams (born 1953) is an American Folklorist, recognised for her research into vernacular architecture, particularly in Appalachia.

She is Emeritus Professor of Folklore at Western Kentucky University.

== Early life and education ==
Williams attended Franklin and Marshall College, Pennsylvania, graduating with a degree in anthropology.

Williams undertook doctoral research at the University of Pennsylvania, achieving a PhD in Folklore and Folklife. Her dissertation supervisor was Don Yoder. Her dissertation formed the basis of her book Homeplace: the social use and meaning of the folk dwelling in southwestern North Carolina (1991).

== Career ==
Williams was based at Western Kentucky University for her entire teaching career, starting in 1986. In 2004, she became Head of the newly created Department of Folk Studies and Anthropology: a role she continued to serve in until 2017.

Williams also worked on various applied projects with her graduate students, including "an oral history project documenting the former logging town of Ravensford, North Carolina, part of a larger cultural resource documentation effort accompanying a transfer of land from the Great Smoky Mountains National Park to the Eastern Band of Cherokee Indians".

== Recognition ==
Williams was president of the American Folklore Society between 2014 and 2015. The title of her presidential address was "After the Revolution: Folklore, History, and the Future of Our Discipline". In 2019, she received the AFS's Kenneth Goldstein Award for Lifetime Academic Leadership.

Williams has also served as Vice president of the Vernacular Architecture Forum.

== Selected publications ==
- Williams, Michael Ann; Dockery, Carl (1984). Marble & log: the history & architecture of Cherokee County, North Carolina. Murphy, N.C. (205 Peachtree St., Murphy 28906): Cherokee County Historical Museum Council, Division of Archives and History, North Carolina Dept. of Cultural Resources. OCLC 11188984.
- Williams, Michael Ann (1987). "Rethinking the House: Interior Space and Social Change". Appalachian Journal. 14 (2): 174–182. ISSN 0090-3779.
- Williams, Michael Ann (1991). Homeplace : the social use and meaning of the folk dwelling in southwestern North Carolina. Athens: University of Georgia Press. ISBN 0-8203-1346-7. OCLC 22663492.
- Williams, Michael Ann (1995). Great Smoky Mountains folklife. Jackson: University Press of Mississippi. ISBN 978-0-87805-791-7. OCLC 636093528.
- Williams, Michael Ann; Young, M. Jane (1995). "Grammar, Codes, and Performance: Linguistic and Sociolinguistic Models in the Study of Vernacular Architecture". Perspectives in Vernacular Architecture. 5: 40–51. doi:10.2307/3514244. ISSN 0887-9885.
- Williams, Michael Ann; University of California, Berkeley; Center for Environmental Design Research (2000). Mobile/izing spatial scales: the shifting politics of tradititon. Berkeley, CA: IASTE, University of California at Berkeley. OCLC 223285975.
- Williams, Michael Ann; Morrisey, Larry (2000). "Constructions of Tradition: Vernacular Architecture, Country Music, and Auto-Ethnography". Perspectives in Vernacular Architecture. 8: 161–175. doi:10.2307/3514412. ISSN 0887-9885.
- Williams, Michael Ann (2001). "Vernacular Architecture and the Park Removals: Traditionalization as Justification and Resistance". Traditional Dwellings and Settlements Review. 13 (1): 33–42. ISSN 1050-2092.
- Williams, Michael Ann (2005). "Selling Domestic Space: The Boarding House in the Southern Mountains". Perspectives in Vernacular Architecture. 12: 1–10. ISSN 0887-9885.
- Williams, Michael Ann (2006). Staging tradition: John Lair and Sarah Gertrude Knott. Urbana, Ill.; Chesham: University of Illinois Press; Combined Academic [distributor. ISBN 978-0-252-03102-1. OCLC 1063396785.
- Lloyd, Timothy; Williams, Michael Ann (2018-01-01). "A Conversation with Timothy Lloyd". Journal of American Folklore. 131 (521): 272–300. doi:10.5406/jamerfolk.131.521.0272. ISSN 0021-8715.
- Williams, M. A. (2020). A Century of Folklore Research and Teaching at Western Kentucky. In P. Sawin & R. L. Zumwalt (Eds.), Folklore in the United States and Canada: An Institutional History (pp. 152–163). Indiana University Press. doi:10.2307/j.ctv16h2ngc.16
- Williams, Michael Ann (2022-01-01). "Back of Beyond: A Horace Kephart Biography Horace Kephart: Writings". Journal of American Folklore. 135 (535): 120–121. doi:10.5406/15351882.135.535.20. ISSN 0021-8715.
