= Samuel Preston Bayard =

- Born: April 10, 1908; Pittsburgh, Pennsylvania
- Died: January 10, 1997 (aged 88); State College, Pennsylvania (Aged 88 years, 9 months, and 0 days)
- Education: Penn State, Harvard
- Occupations: folklorist, college professor
- Known for: melodic families, fiddle tunes collection

Samuel Preston Bayard (April 10, 1908, in Pittsburgh, Pennsylvania – January 10, 1997, in State College, Pennsylvania) was an American folklorist and musicologist. He received a B.A. in English from Pennsylvania State University in 1934 and later earned an M.A. from Harvard University.

He collected fiddle and fife tunes in southwestern Pennsylvania and northern West Virginia from 1928 to 1963. He is known for his interest in the melodies of traditional music at a time when often only the texts were collected. He introduced the concept of "melodic families", which are groups of tunes that appears to be structurally related. He traced the origins of many traditional American fiddle tunes back to the British Isles.

In addition to his work on fiddle tunes, he was the expert on the use of the fife in traditional American music. He is fondly remembered by former students for his large collection of snuffboxes, which he used regularly.

He established the folklore program at Pennsylvania State University, and taught there from 1945 to 1973

He was a fellow of the American Folklore Society, and its president from 1965 to 1966.

He died on January 10, 1997, in State College, Pennsylvania. An award in his name has been established at Penn State for graduate students in comparative literature.

== On-line publications ==
- "Samuel P. Bayard Tape Collection" (PDF). sas.upenn.edu. Archived from the original (PDF) on November 29, 2007.
- Hill Country Tunes (1944) http://www.mne.psu.edu/lamancusa/tunes/hct/index.htm
- Guide to the Samuel P. Bayard Papers https://aspace.libraries.psu.edu/repositories/3/resources/2974
- Samuel P. Bayard folklore recordings https://www.youtube.com/playlist?list=PLfkrWr_vIGB9l33oOjTC2M6JlhxfoPlQz

== Bibliography ==
- Bayard, Samuel (1944). Hill Country Tunes. Memoirs of the American Folklore Society. Vol. 39. Philadelphia: American Folklore Society. OCLC 18596339.
- Bayard, Samuel (1982). Dance to the Fiddle March to the Fife. University Park, Pennsylvania: Penn State Press. ISBN 978-0-271-00299-6. OCLC 186816800.

== Obituaries ==
- "Obituary: Samuel Preston Bayard (1908-1997), An Appreciation". Journal of American Folklore. 100 (438 (Autumn 1997)). 1997.
- Zolten, J. Jerome (1997). "In Memoriam: Samuel Bayard". Sing Out! (May).
