= John W. Roberts (academic) =

Black studies scholar (born 1949)

John W. Roberts (born 1949) is an academic who specialises in Folklore, African-American Studies, and English Literature. His work has argued for the "integrity, authenticity, and authority" of African-American vernacular traditions.

He is Professor Emeritus of English at Ohio State University.

== Early life and education ==
Roberts gained a bachelor's degree in English from Tusculum College, Tennessee, before studying for a master's degree in English at Columbia University. He then researched for a doctorate in English (with a specialization in English) at Ohio State University.

== Career ==
Roberts taught at the University of Pennsylvania, becoming both associate professor in the Folklore and Folklife department and Director of the Afro-American studies program.

Roberts joined Ohio State University as a professor of English in 1996. In 1998, he was appointed Chair of the Department of African-American and African Studies.

In 2000, Roberts was appointed Deputy Chair of the National Endowments for the Humanities. In 2003, he returned to Ohio State University, becoming Dean of Arts and Humanities in 2004. In 2010, he was appointed Dean of the College of Liberal Arts and Social Sciences (CLASS) at the University of Houston.

In 2015, Roberts was appointed Vice President of Isaacson Miller, an executive search firm.

== Recognition ==
Roberts served as the president of the American Folklore Society from 1997 to 1998. His Presidential lecture was titled, '"... Hidden Right out in the Open": The Field of Folklore and the Problem of Invisibility' and examined the difficulties faced by Folklore in establishing itself as a discipline in American Colleges and Universities. Roberts had also served as the President of the Association of African and African-American Folklorists from 1989 to 1997.

As well as role at the National Endowment for the Humanities, Roberts has served on several other committees, including the President's Committee on the Arts and Humanities, and the board of both the University of Pennsylvania Press, and the board of the Smithsonian Institution's Folklife and Cultural Studies programs.

Roberts was awarded a Guggenheim Fellowship for 1994–1995.

== Selected publications ==
Roberts, John W. (1981). ""Railroad Bill" and the American Outlaw Tradition". Western Folklore. 40 (4): 315–328. doi:10.2307/1499713. ISSN 0043-373X.

Roberts, John W. (1982). "Strategy, Morality and Worldview of the Afro-American Spirituals and Trickster Tales," Western Journal of Black Studies 6 (1982): 101–107.

Roberts, John W. (1983). "Stackolee and the Development of a Black Heroic Idea". Western Folklore. 42 (3): 179–190. doi:10.2307/1499416. ISSN 0043-373X.

Roberts, John W. (1984), "James Baldwin," in Thadious Davis and Trudier Harris, eds., Afro-American Fiction Writers After 1955. Detroit: Gale Research Co., 1984, pp3–16. ISBN 978-0-8103-1711-6. OCLC 1015160502.

Roberts, John W (1990). From trickster to badman: the Black folk hero in slavery and freedom. Philadelphia: Univ. of Pennsylvania Press. ISBN 978-0-8122-8141-5. OCLC 263444631.

Roberts, John W. (1993). "African American Diversity and the Study of Folklore". Western Folklore. 52 (2/4): 157–171. doi:10.2307/1500084. ISSN 0043-373X.

Roberts, John W. (1995). From hucklebuck to hip-hop : social dance in the African-American community in Philadelphia. Philadelphia, PA: Odunde Inc. ISBN 1-885066-11-2. OCLC 36033946.

Roberts, John W. (1996) "African American Folklore," in the Encyclopedia of African American Culture and History, edited by Jack Salzman, David Lionel Smith and Cornel West, New York: MacMillan Library Reference. ISBN 978-0-02-897345-6. OCLC 989040700

Roberts, John W. (1999). ""... Hidden Right out in the Open": The Field of Folklore and the Problem of Invisibility 1998 American Folklore Society Presidential Address". The Journal of American Folklore. 112 (444): 119–139. doi:10.2307/541945. ISSN 0021-8715.

Roberts, John W. (2001), “Tricksters, Martyrs, Black Firsts: Representations of the Hero in African American Folk Art,” in Souls Grown Deep: African American Vernacular Art of the South, Volume II. Edited by Paul Arnett and William Arnett, Atlanta: Tinwood Books, pp. 74–91. ISBN 978-0-9653766-3-1. OCLC 320010062.

Roberts, John W. (2008). "Grand Theory, Nationalism, and American Folklore". Journal of Folklore Research. 45 (1): 45–54. ISSN 0737-7037.

Roberts, John W. (2016), 'Introduction' to Newsum, H. E SoulStirrers : Black Art and the Neo-Ancestral Impulse. Demetrius Lynn Eudell, John W. Roberts. Jackson. ISBN 978-1-62674-634-3. OCLC 908287092.

Roberts, John W. (2021-01-01). "Systemic Racism in American Folkloristics". Journal of American Folklore. 134 (533): 265–271. doi:10.5406/jamerfolk.134.533.0265. ISSN 0021-8715.
