= Wafa Tarnowska =

Lebanese-Polish writer

Wafa Tarnowska is a Lebanese-Polish writer, translator, and storyteller who has divided her life between Europe and the Middle East. She considers herself a bridge between East and West, and has opened a window onto the Arab world by rewriting eight stories from One Thousand and One Nights. She has lived and worked in Australia, India, Cyprus, Poland, and Dubai, and currently resides and works in the United Kingdom.

== Early life and education ==
Tarnowska was born in Beirut and attended a French school. She graduated with a Bachelor of Arts (BA) from the University of Melbourne. She subsequently pursued a Master of Arts (MA) at the American University of Beirut.

== Writings ==
"One Thousand and One Nights" was written by Kalimat Publishing and Distribution House.

Her stories from One Thousand and One Nights have been translated into Arabic, French, Korean, Dutch, Portuguese, and Spanish. Wafa translates plays from Arabic into English, in addition to translating TV documentaries.Her most recent play, translated from Arabic in the Syrian dialect, "Your Love is Fire," was performed at the Edinburgh Fringe Festival in August 2017. She has also translated several children's books from Arabic into English, published by Mantra Lingua.

Wafa also works as a presenter and lecturer, as well as translating many documentaries for the BBC,and one of them won the best documentary award at the Cannes Film Festival in 2019.

== Awards ==
She received the Aesop Accolade Award from the American Folklore Society, the Gold Medal for the Moon Beam Award and the Smithsonian Magazine Award for Outstanding Children's Book in 2011.
