= Francis Utley =

American linguist

Francis Lee Utley (May 25, 1907 in Watertown, Wisconsin – March 8, 1974) was a folklorist, linguist, medievalist, scholar of onomastics and literature, educator, and author.

== Life and career ==
Born and raised in Watertown, Wisconsin, Utley attended the University of Wisconsin, from which he graduated with honors in 1929. He did his graduate literary studies at Harvard, earning the M.A. in 1934 and the Ph.D. in 1936. At Harvard, he came under the influence of George Lyman Kittredge in English who encouraged Utley's study of folklore. In 1936, he married Ruth Alice Scott and they had three children: Philip Lee, Andrew Scott, and Jean Marie.

Utley began his teaching career in 1935 in the English department at Ohio State University; in 1973, he received the title of Professor of English and Folklore. He also served as visiting professor of folklore at the University of California at Berkeley and UCLA. He was president of the American Folklore Society from 1951 to 1952, president of the American Name Society in 1956, and president of the College English Association in 1969. Among his honors were being named Fellow of the American Folklore Society, Fellow of the American Anthropological Association, and Executive Council member of the Modern Language Association.

== Scholarship ==
Utley worked in a variety of genres of literature and folklore, but is best known for work in folk narrative, onomastics, medieval literature, and dialect. D.K. Wilgus summarized his most significant contributions as "Bible of the Folk" (such as the Noah story in folk culture) and his contributions to the definitions and boundaries of folklore. He also is often cited for diffusionist ideas about relations of the sources of New World folktales from Europe. Indicative of the respect he received for his scholarship is a published festschrift honoring his contributions: Medieval Literature and Folklore Studies: Essays in Honor of Francis Lee Utley (1970).

== Books and Major Articles ==
- The Crooked Rib: An Analytic Index to the Argument About Women in English and Scots Literature to the End of the Year 1568. Columbus: Ohio State University, 1944.

(ed., Bear, Man, and God: Eight Approaches to William Faulkner's The Bear. New York: Random House, 1971.

- "Folk Literature: An Operational Definition." Journal of American Folklore 74 (1961): 193–206. Reprinted in The Study of Folklore, ed. Alan Dundes (Englewood Cliffs, NJ: Prentice-Hall, 1965).
- "The Study of Folk Literature: Its Scope and Use." Journal of American Folklore 71 (1958): 139–148.
- "The Bible of the Folk." California Folklore Quarterly 4 (1945): 1–17.
- "When Nettles in Winter Bring Forth Roses Red." PMLA 60 (1945): 346–55.
- "The Linguistic Component of Onomastics." Names 11 (1963): 145–76
- "The Migration of Folktales: Four Channels to the Americas" Current Anthropology 15 (1974): 5–13.
