= Jane C. Beck =

American folklorist and oral historian

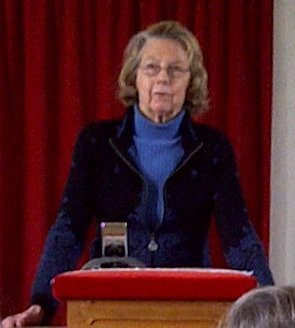
Jane Beck in Ripton, Vermont in 2011

Jane C. Beck (born 1941) is an American folklorist and oral historian. She is Executive Director Emeritus and founder of the Vermont Folklife Center and has published research on the folklore of Vermont and on African American belief systems.

== Early life and education ==
Jane (née Choate) Beck grew up in Long Island, New York. Her father, Thomas Hyde Choate, worked as an investment banker. Her mother, Jane Harte Choate was involved with a number of charitable organizations.

Beck attended St. Timothy's School in Maryland and then Middlebury College, Vermont. At Middlebury College, she read American Literature and met her future husband, Professor Horace Beck. She graduated from Middlebury College in 1963 and undertook graduate studies in folklore at the University of Pennsylvania. She married Horace in 1965. She completed her Ph.D. in 1969 with a thesis entitled 'Ghostlore of the British Isles and Ireland'.

== Career ==
Beck began work as state folklorist for Vermont in 1978. The role was created through the Vermont Council on the Arts.

Beck founded the Vermont Folklife Center as a private non-profit organization in 1983. She served as its executive director until 2007.

After retirement, Beck published Daisy Turner's Kin: An African American Family Saga (2015). Daisy Turner was the daughter of freed African American slaves and the book relates four generations of oral history from her family. It was based on interviews Beck carried out with Turner, beginning in 1983 when Turner was 100 years old. Beck traveled to Virginia, West Africa, and England to research the family history of Turner for the book.

== Recognition ==
Beck served as president of the American Folklore Society (AFS) between 1995 and 1996. Her Presidential address was titled 'Talking Stock' and reflected on her 35 years as a member of the AFS. It drew on interviews with 100 fellow members of the Society.

She received the Lifetime Achievement Award from the Center for Vermont Research at the University of Vermont in 2011.

In 2016, Daisy Turner's Kin: An African American Family Saga was awarded both the Wayland D. Hand Prize (by the History and Folklore Section) and the Chicago Folklore Prize (as "best book of folklore scholarship for the year") by the American Folklore Society.

== Selected publications ==
- Beck, Jane C. (1970). "The White Lady of Great Britain and Ireland". Folklore. 81 (4): 292–306. ISSN 0015-587X.
- Beck, Jane C. (1972). "The Giant Beaver: A Prehistoric Memory?". Ethnohistory. 19 (2): 109–122. doi:10.2307/481746. ISSN 0014-1801.
- Beck, Jane C. (1973). "'Dream Messages' from the Dead". Journal of the Folklore Institute. 10 (3): 173–186. doi:10.2307/3814194. ISSN 0015-5934.
- Beck, Jane C. (1975). "The West Indian Supernatural World: Belief Integration in a Pluralistic Society". The Journal of American Folklore. 88 (349): 235–244. doi:10.2307/538884. ISSN 0021-8715.
- Beck, Jane C. (1976). "The Implied Obeah Man". Western Folklore. 35 (1): 23–33. doi:10.2307/1499150. ISSN 0043-373X.
- Beck, Jane C (1979). To Windward of the Land: The Occult World of Alexander Charles. Bloomington; London: Indiana Univ. Pr. OCLC 253420043.
- Beck, Jane C (1982). Always in Season: Folk Art and Traditional Culture in Vermont. Montpelier, Vt.: Vermont Council on the Arts. ISBN 0-916718-09-3. OCLC 9359736.
- Beck, Jane C (1995). Vermont recollections: sifting memories through the interview process. Orono: Maine Folklife Center. ISBN 978-0-943197-22-7. OCLC 479593651.
- Beck, Jane C (1985). Legacy of the Lake: A Study Guide to Folklore of the Lake Champlain Region. Montpelier, Vt.: Vermont Folklife Center.
- Beck, Jane C (1988). The General Store in Vermont: An Oral History. Middlebury, Vt.: Vermont Folklife Center. OCLC 31008374.
- Beck, Jane C. (1997). "Taking Stock: 1996 American Folklore Society Presidential Address". The Journal of American Folklore. 110 (436): 123–139. doi:10.2307/541809. ISSN 0021-8715.
- Beck, Jane C. (2015). Daisy Turner's Kin: An African American Family Saga. Urbana. ISBN 978-0-252-09728-7. OCLC 910662349.
- Gerzina, Gretchen; Beck, Jane C.; Kolovos, Andy; Chambliss, Julian C.; Veitch, Ezra; Bennett, Marek. (2021). Turner family stories : from enslavement in Virginia to freedom in Vermont. Middlebury, VT. ISBN 978-0-916718-01-5. OCLC 1274236620.
