= Jo Radner =

American folklorist and storyteller

- Employer: American University

Joan Newlon Radner is an American folklorist, storyteller and oral historian. She is Professor Emerita at American University in Washington, DC.

== Education ==
Radner has a BA, MA, and PhD from Harvard University. Her Ph.D. thesis was titled 'Fragmentary annals of Ireland from MS 5301–5320, Bibliothèque royale de Belgique, Brussels' and was submitted in 1971.

== Career ==
Radner began her research career in Celtic Studies, but later published in Irish history and literature, folklore and feminist theory. She was based at American University in Washington, DC where she taught courses in literature, American Studies, folklore, and storytelling.

Radner regularly presents 'Burnt into Memory', a performance based around the wildfires that ravaged Brownfield, Maine in 1947. She constructed 'Burnt into Memory' from over 30 hours of interviews with local Brownfield residents who experienced the fires.

== Recognition ==
Her book Feminist messages: coding in women's folk culture was awarded the Elli Kongas-Maranda Prize of the American Folklore Society.

Radner served as president of the American Folklore Society (AFS) between 1999 and 2000. Her Presidential Address was titled 'AFS Now and Tomorrow: The View from the Stepladder' and stressed the need for the folklore profession to have more diverse practitioners. She also served as President of the National Storytelling Network: her Presidential Address was titled "On the Threshold of Power: The Storytelling Movement Today".

In 2013, Radner's album Yankee Ingenuity: Stories of Headstrong and Resourceful People, received a Storytelling World Award. In the same year she was awarded the Brother Blue and Ruth Hill Award from the League for the Advancement of New England Storytelling.

In 2017, Radner became a Fellow of the AFS.

== Selected publications ==
- Radner, Joan Newlon (1978). Fragmentary annals of Ireland. Dublin: Dublin Institute for Advanced Studies. OCLC 932570639.
- Radner, Joan N. (1983) “The significance of the threefold death in Celtic tradition”, in: Ford, Patrick K. [ed.], Celtic folklore and Christianity: studies in memory of William W. Heist, Santa Barbara, California: McNally and Loftin, 180–200.
- Radner, Joan N.; Lanser, Susan S. (1987). "The Feminist Voice: Strategies of Coding in Folklore and Literature". The Journal of American Folklore. 100 (398). University of Illinois Press: 412. doi:10.2307/540901. ISSN 0021-8715. JSTOR 540901.
- Radner, Joan N. (1988). “Interpreting irony in medieval Celtic narrative: the case of Culhwch ac Olwen”, Cambridge Medieval Celtic Studies 16: 41–59.
- Owens, Cóilín.; Radner, Joan Newlon (1990). Irish drama, 1900-1980. Washington, D.C.: Catholic University of America Press. ISBN 0-8132-0705-3. OCLC 19263363.
- Radner, Joan N.(1990) “‘Men will die’: poets, harpers and women in early Irish literature”, in: Matonis, A. T. E., and Daniel F. Melia (eds.), Celtic language, Celtic culture: a festschrift for Eric P. Hamp, Van Nuys, California: Ford & Bailie. 172–186.
- Radner, Joan N. (1992-01-01). "The Combat of Lug and Balor: Discourses of Power in Irish Myth and Folktale". Oral Tradition. 7 (1): 143–149. ISSN 0883-5365
- Radner, Joan Newlon (1993). Feminist messages : coding in women's folk culture (in Dutch). Urbana: University of Illinois Press. ISBN 0-252-01957-1. OCLC 25833102.
- Radner, Joan N (1999). “Writing history: early Irish historiography and the significance of form”, Celtica 23: 312–325.
- Radner, Joan N. (2001-07-01). "AFS Now and Tomorrow: The View from the Stepladder (AFS Presidential Address, 28 October 2000)". Journal of American Folklore. 114 (453). University of Illinois Press: 263–276. doi:10.2307/542023. ISSN 0021-8715. JSTOR 542023.
- Radner, Jo; Sobol, Joseph; Novak, David; Dietz, Karen; Timpanetli, Qioia; Lipman, Doug (2004), "Visions for Storytelling Studies: Why, How, and for Whom?", Storytelling, Self, Society, 1 (1), Taylor & Francis: 8–27, OCLC 768209039
- Radner, Jo (2008-01-01). "On the Threshold of Power: The Storytelling Movement Today". Storytelling, Self, Society. 4 (1). ISSN 1550-5340
