= William Bascom =

American folklorist

- Born: May 23, 1912; Princeton, Illinois
- Died: September 11, 1981 (aged 69)
- Education: Northwestern University
- Known for: studies of Yoruba culture and religion; "four functions of folklore"
- Scientific career
- Fields: folklore, cultural anthropology
- Workplaces: Lowie Museum of Anthropology, University of California, Berkeley
- Doctoral advisor: Melville J. Herskovits

William R. Bascom (May 23, 1912 – September 11, 1981) was an American folklorist, anthropologist, and museum director. He was a specialist in the art and culture of West Africa and the African Diaspora, especially the Yoruba of Nigeria.

== Biography ==
Bascom completed his B.A. at the University of Wisconsin, and earned his Ph.D. in anthropology at Northwestern University under Melville J. Herskovits in 1939, which was based on research carried out amongst the Yoruba. Bascom was the first American anthropologist to carry out fieldwork among the Yoruba.

Bascom taught at Northwestern, Cambridge University. During World War II, he joined the O.S.S. and together with Ralph Bunche co-authored an unsigned volume, A Pocket Guide to West Africa in 1943.

Post-war, Bascom and his Cuban-born wife, Berta began research into practices of Yoruba origin - such as the Shango cult and Santeria - in Cuba and elsewhere. Berta was a lifelong co-worker with Bascom.

In 1957 he left Northwestern University for the University of California, Berkeley where he become the first director of the Lowie Museum of Anthropology, a post he held until his retirement in 1979. Bascom also helped in the creation of the master's degree program at Berkeley in 1965.

Several of Bascom's articles on folkloristics serve as texts in graduate courses in folklore: his essays were regularly anthologised during his career. Published posthumously, Bascom's African folktales in the New World (1992) has been credited with making important contributions to debates around "diffusion and independent invention".

== Recognition ==
Bascom served as president of the American Folklore Society between 1953 and 1954. His two Presidential Addresses were titled "Four Functions of Folklore" and "Verbal Art". His book Ifa Divination: Communication Between Gods and Men in West Africa was awarded the Pitrè Prize.

== Four functions of folklore ==
In a major article published in 1954, Bascom argued that folklore can serve four primary functions in a culture:

- Folklore lets people escape from repressions imposed upon them by society e.g.: tall tales
- Folklore validates culture, justifying its rituals and institutions to those who perform and observe them.
- Folklore is a pedagogic device which reinforces morals and values and builds wit. e.g.: scary stories/moral lessons
- Folklore is a means of applying social pressure and exercising social control. e.g.: the boy who cried wolf

== Major works ==
- Bascom, William R. (1943). "The Relationship of Yoruba Folklore to Divining," The Journal of American Folklore, 56(220), 127–131.
- Bascom, William R. (1943). The Sociological Role of the Yoruba Cult-Group. Menasha (Wis.): American Anthropological Association. OCLC 601812795.
- Bascom, William R. (1947). Ponape: A Pacific Economy in Transition
- Bascom, William R. (1954). "Four Functions of Folklore". The Journal of American Folklore. 67 (266): 333–349. doi:10.2307/536411. ISSN 0021-8715. JSTOR 536411.
- Bascom, William R. (1955). "Urbanization Among the Yoruba," American Journal of Sociology. 60(5), 446–454.
- Bascom, William R. (1955). "Verbal Art," The Journal of American Folklore, 68(269), 245–252.
- Bascom, William R.; Herskovits, Melville J (eds.) (1959). Continuity and Change in African Culture
- Bascom, William R. (1964). "Folklore Research in Africa," The Journal of American Folklore, 77(303), 12–31.
- Bascom, William R. (1965). "The Forms of Folklore: Prose Narratives". The Journal of American Folklore, 78(307), 3–20.
- Bascom, William R. (1969). The Yoruba of Southwestern Nigeria. New York; Chicago: Holt Rinehart and Winston. ISBN 978-0-03-081249-1. OCLC 715779786.
- Bascom, William R. (1969). Ifa Divination: Communication Between Gods and Men in West Africa. Bloomington: Indiana University Press. OCLC 929811461.
- Bascom, William R. (1973). African Art in Cultural Perspective: An Introduction. New York: Norton. ISBN 978-0-393-04368-6. OCLC 603357602.
- Bascom, William R. (1973). "Folklore, Verbal Art, and Culture," The Journal of American Folklore, 86(342), 374–381.
- Bascom, William R. (ed.) (1975). African Dilemma Tales. The Hague: Mouton. ISBN 978-90-279-7509-6. OCLC 981270186.
- Bascom, William R. (ed.) (1977). Frontiers of Folklore. Boulder, Colo.: Published by Westview Press for the American Association for the Advancement of Science, Washington, D.C. ISBN 978-0-89158-432-2. OCLC 3275349.
- Bascom, William R. (1980). Sixteen Cowries: Yoruba Divination from Africa to the New World. Bloomington: Indiana Univ. Pr. OCLC 263249925.
- Bascom, William R. (1992). African folktales in the New World. Bloomington: Indiana University Press. ISBN 978-0-253-31128-3. OCLC 25048839.

== Sources ==
- Robert Georges & Michael Owen Jones, Folkloristics: An Introduction, Indiana University Press, 1995, pp. 171–192.
- Daniel Crowley and Alan Dundes, "Obituary: William Russel Bascom," Journal of American Folklore 95 (1982): 465–7.
- Phoebe A. Hearst Museum of Anthropology website - History page
