= International Society for Ethnology and Folklore =

Learned society

The International Society for Ethnology and Folklore (French: Société Internationale d’Ethnologie et de Folklore or SIEF) is a professional association of scholars in the fields of ethnology, folklore studies, and cultural anthropology based in Amsterdam at the Meertens Institute. The goal of SIEF is to create professional networks between its scholars and their institutes and to stimulate research in general. To accomplish that every two years an international scholarly congress is organised and a General Assembly is held. Within its framework various special interest working groups are active: on cultural heritage, religion, rituality, cultural analysis, etc.

The organisation was established in 1964 in Athens based on an earlier Commission des Arts et Traditions Populaires (CIAP) founded in 1928 at the 'Congrès International des Arts Populaires' in Prague under the auspices of the League of Nations. The current president of SIEF is Marie Sandberg (Denmark), who began her tenure in 2021. The membership of the society was during the last years around 800 members.

SIEF is associated with the American Folklore Society (AFS) and the European Association of Social Anthropologists (EASA). The society is a member of the World Council of Anthropological Associations.

== Academic journals ==
SIEF has two scholarly journals, Ethnologia Europaea and Cultural Analysis, in addition to the SIEF Newsletter. All three publications are biannual.
