= Michael Owen Jones =

American folklorist (born 1942)

Michael Owen Jones (born 1942) is an American Folklorist and emeritus Professor in the World Arts and Cultures/Dance Program at University of California, Los Angeles (UCLA).

Jones has wide-ranging research interests: he is particularly known for his research on folk medicine and on foodways but has also researched on other of genres of folklore including "folk belief, speech... arts and crafts and poetry".

== Early life and education ==
Jones studied at the University of Kansas, earning a BA in history, Art and Political Science in 1960. He studied folklore at Indiana University Bloomington earning a MA in 1964 and a Ph.D. (in Folklore and American Studies) in 1970. His Ph.D. dissertation was titled 'Chairmaking in Appalachia; a study in style and creative imagination in American folk art'.

== Career ==
Jones moved to a position at UCLA in 1968 in the Folklore and Mythology Program and remained there for the entirety of his career. He was a founding member of UCLA's Interdepartmental Program in World Arts & Cultures in 1973.

Jones has conducted fieldwork in "Western Canada and the Maritimes as well as Appalachia, the Great Plains, and Southern California".

Jones has authored over 230 academic works. He was also a general editor of the Folk Art and Artists Series, University Press of Mississippi.

In 2021, Jones co-launched the Archive of Feeling, "one of the largest databases of medicinal folklore from around the world", based in part on material collected by Jones that became part of the UCLA Archive of American Folk Medicine.

== Recognition ==
He has received funding from a number of organisations, including the National Endowment for the Humanities, Skaggs Foundation, Canadian Museum of Civilization and the National Institutes of Health.

He is a Fellow of the American Folklore Society (AFS) and a former member of the AFS's executive board. He is also a former President of the AFS, serving in that role between 2004 and 2005. His Presidential Address focused on foodways.

Jones is also a former President of the California Folklore Society and has served as a council member of the California Council for the Humanities.

He is a Woodrow Wilson Fellow and also a Fellow of the Finnish Academy of Sciences and Letters, and the Society for Applied Anthropology.

His book Frankenstein Was a Vegetarian: Essays on Food Choice, Identity, and Symbolism was nominated for the Bookseller/Diagram Prize for Oddest Title of the Year in 2022.

== Selected publications ==
- Owen Jones, Michael; National Museum of Man (Canada) (1972). Why faith healing?. National Museum of Man. OCLC 911761180.
- Jones, Michael Owen (1975). The hand made object and its maker. Berkeley: University of California. ISBN 978-0-520-02697-1. OCLC 1131420358.
- Georges, Robert A. and Jones, Michael Owen (1980). People Studying People : the Human Element in Fieldwork. Berkeley: University of California Press. ISBN 978-0-520-90649-5. OCLC 609849920.
- Jones, Michael Owen; Giuliano, Bruce; Krell, Roberta (eds.) (1981). Foodways and eating habits: directions for research. Los Angeles, Calif.: California Folklore Society. OCLC 9523461.
- Jones, Michael Owen (ed.) (1987). The World of the Kalevala: essays in celebration of the 150 year jubilee of the publication of the Finnish national epic. Los Angeles: UCLA Folklore and Mythology Publications. ISBN 978-0-915251-30-8. OCLC 19964341.
- Jones, Michael Owen; Moore, Michael Dane; Snyder, Richard Christopher (eds.) (1987). Inside organizations: understanding the human dimension. Newbury Park, Calif.: Sage. ISBN 978-0-8039-3198-5. OCLC 609425734.
- Jones, Michael Owen (1993). Exploring folk art twenty years of thought on craft, work, and aesthetics. Logan, Utah: Utah State University Press. ISBN 978-0-87421-380-5. OCLC 1261982241.
- Jones, Michael Owen (1989). Craftsman of the Cumberlands: tradition & creativity. Lexington, Kentucky: University Pr. of Kentucky. ISBN 978-0-8131-1672-3. OCLC 231001023.
- Jones, Michael Owen (ed.) (1994). Putting folklore to use. Lexington, Ky.: University Press of Kentucky. 1994. ISBN 0-8131-1825-5. OCLC 28182139.
- Georges, Robert A; Jones, Michael Owen (1995). Folkloristics: an introduction. Bloomington: Indiana University Press. ISBN 978-0-253-32934-9. OCLC 32274290.
- Jones, Michael Owen (1996). Studying organizational symbolism: what, how, why?. Thousand Oaks, Calif.: Sage. ISBN 978-0-7619-0220-1. OCLC 797744750.
- Jones, Michael Owen (2017). Corn: a global history. London: Reaktion Books. ISBN 978-1-78023-816-6. OCLC 1120660784.
- Jones, Michael Owen; Long, Lucy M (eds.) (2017). Comfort food: meanings and memories. Jackson : University Press of Mississippi ISBN 978-1-4968-1084-7. OCLC 960741780.
- Jones, Michael Owen (2022). Frankenstein Was A Vegetarian: essays on food choice, identity, and symbolism. S.l.: University Press of Mississippi. ISBN 978-1-4968-3994-7. OCLC 1282006325.
