= Regina Bendix =

Swiss academic

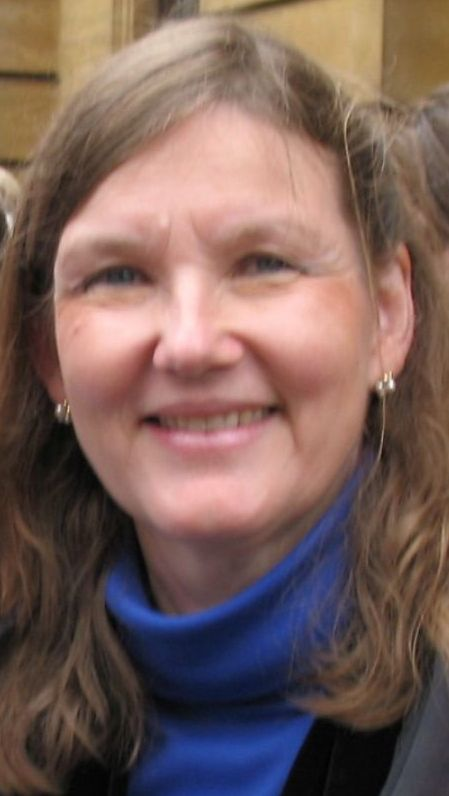
Regina Bendix (2009)

Regina Bendix (born May, 31, 1958) is a professor of European ethnology at the University of Göttingen, Germany.

== History ==
Bendix began her academic studies in Volkskunde, cultural anthropology and German studies in her native Switzerland. She immigrated to the United States in 1980 when she moved to Berkeley, California. Here she completed a B.A. in Folklore at the University of California, Berkeley. She pursued graduate studies at Indiana University (Bloomington) where she completed an M.A. in 1984 in Folklore, with minors in cultural anthropology and German studies. Ultimately she was awarded her PhD in these disciplines in 1987. After teaching at various institutions in the United States and Switzerland, in 1993 she took a position as assistant professor at the University of Pennsylvania, in the Department of Folklore and Folklife. She would ultimately be appointed associate professor and chair of the Program in Folklore and Folklife within the Department of Anthropology at Penn. She served in this capacity from 1993 until 2001, when she returned to Europe.

== Career ==
Bendix is currently professor and chair of European ethnology at the University of Göttingen, Germany. Starting in the mid-1990s Dr. Bendix' research interests and fieldwork focused on cultural tourism (primarily in Austria) embedded within the larger historical project of popular ethnography in the late 19th-century Austro-Hungarian Empire. Since moving to Germany, she has devoted significant ethnographic attention to the workings of the academic framework in Germany. Her research emphases continue to focus on narrative, tourism, heritage and culture, the ethnography of the senses, the history of cultural fields of research and the culture of academia.

Bendix was president of the International Society for Ethnology and Folklore from 2001 to 2008. Her language fluencies include: Swiss German (native), German, English, French, and some Italian.

== Other ventures ==
Bendix has a film editing credit for the 2005 production of the German documentary on folklore titled Musical und Märchenstunde.

One of her most influential written works is In Search of Authenticity. The Formation of Folklore Studies (Madison: University of Wisconsin Press, 1997). She produced a relevant collection of articles for the study of folklore: Regina F. Bendix and Galit Hasan-Rokem (eds.), A Companion to Folklore (Chichester: Wiley-Blackwell, 2012).
