= Marilyn M. White =

American folklorist

Marilyn M. White is an American folklorist who researches African American folklore and family folklore.

== Biography ==
White attended East Orange High School in New Jersey, United States. She received her B.A. in English from Hampton University in Virginia in 1969, a M.A. in folklore from Indiana University Bloomington in 1971, and a PhD in anthropology (folklore) from the University of Texas at Austin in 1983.

White conducts research in Little Cayman, Cayman Islands. She was a professor of cultural anthropology and American studies at Kean University in New Jersey from 1985 to 2011. She also previously taught at Western Kentucky University for eight years. In 2023, Dr. White returned to WKU to give a presentation about her experiences with folklore, interactions with other folklore scholars, and what she has learned about the culture and environment of a small Caribbean island.

White is the president of the American Folklore Society and the long-time president of the Association of African and African American Folklorists. White is also ex officio member of the board of trustees of the American Folklife Center in Washington, D.C.

White's research has included kente cloth construction and its use in Ghanaian culture and African-American popular culture.
