= William Wells Newell =

William Wells Newell (1839–1907) was an American folklorist, school teacher, minister and philosophy professor.

== Biography ==
Newell was born in Cambridge, Massachusetts. He graduated from Harvard College and Harvard Divinity School. After trying his hand at ministry, he was a faculty member at the new philosophy department at Harvard University for a few years. However, the bulk of Newell's career was as a school teacher. He taught at the Wells School—founded by his grandfather, William Wells—situated on Elmwood Avenue. Newell founded the American Folklore Society in 1888 where he edited the Journal of American Folklore. His best known work is Games and Songs of American Children (1883, Mineola, N. Y.). The songs included tunes with the lyrics, and this book is the first collection of the folk music of American children. Dover Publications of New York published a reprint edition (with a new introduction and index by Carl Withers; ISBN 0-486-20354-9); Nabu Press published the book again in 2010 (ISBN 978-1-145-39322-6).

== Legacy ==
The American Folklore Society's Children's Folklore Section awards the annual W. W. Newell Prize, which is presented for the best student essay.
