= Daniel J. Crowley =

American art historian

- Born: November 27, 1921; Peoria, Illinois
- Died: February 24, 1998 (aged 76); Oruro, Bolivia
- Education: Northwestern University (1943); M.A., Bradley University (1948); Ph.D., Northwestern University (1956)
- Occupations: Art historian and cultural anthropologist
- Spouse: Pearl Ramcharan-Crowley

Daniel J. Crowley (November 27, 1921 – February 24, 1998) was an American art historian and cultural anthropologist who focused on the cultural expressions of Sub-Saharan Africa and the Caribbean, with particular focus on the interconnectedness of carnivals, festivals, the arts and folklore. Crowley also became a strong advocate for disability studies in anthropology.

== Early years ==
Crowley was born in the St. Francis Hospital in Peoria, Illinois. He was one of two children born to Michael Bartholomew Jeremiah Crowley and Elsie Magdalena Cecilia Schnebelin. He remained in Peoria into early adulthood. After receiving a B.A. in Theory and Practice of Art from Northwestern University in 1943, Crowley served time with the U.S. Navy during World War II (1942–1947) as a Lieutenant JG with the USS American Legion. In April 1946, he contracted poliomyelitis and was left a partial quadriplegic.

== Academic career ==
=== General history ===
After spending 10 months recovering from his bout with polio, Crowley continued to pursue his education. He received an M.A. In Art History from Bradley University in 1948, followed by a Ph.D. In Anthropology (African Studies) from Northwestern University in 1956 under the supervision of Melville Herskovits and in the intellectual tradition of Franz Boas. Much of Crowley's scholarship was perpetuated by his love of travel as many of his university appointments took him all over the world.

Crowley was hired as a member of The University of California, Davis faculty as a double Professor of Anthropology and Art in 1961. He continued to teach at the university after his retirement in 1992. Between the years of 1968–1971, Crowley received the UC Centennial Citation and became the founding director of the UC Education Abroad Program in partnership with the University of Ghana-Legon. Throughout his career, Crowley was a member of the National Commission for UNESCO (1974–1980), served on many journal editorial boards, published 4 books, a commercial recording, and approximately 350 articles and reviews. Many university and national archives benefited from the donation of art and cultural memorabilia which he accumulated from places such as Africa, Asia, the Caribbean and Aboriginal Australia.

According to his curriculum vitae, he conducted field research in: the Bahama Islands; Trinidad, Tobago, St. Lucia; Western European Ethnographic Museums; Zaire, Angola, Zambia, Tanzania; Southern Africa; Mexico; Ghana, Togo, Dahomey; Senegambia; Brazil; India; Guinea-Bissau; the Canary Islands; Cape Verde; Australia; New Guinea, Melanesia, Polynesia. His research interests included: African and African-derived societies; graphic and plastic arts, folklore, music; the role of artists in culture; multi-cultural societies; ethnoaesthetics, comparative aesthetic values; festivals and carnivals.

Through his experiences, Crowley identified himself as a Boasian particularist Folklorist. Crowley felt his contributions to the sub-discipline of folklore were one of his more successful academic achievements.

=== Sub-Saharan Africa ===
Crowley's fieldwork in Sub-Saharan Africa was about rehabilitating "the image of Africa denigrated to justify slavery".

=== The Caribbean ===
The majority of Crowley's fieldwork in the Caribbean was mainly undertaken in Nassau, The Bahamas. "I Could Talk Old-Story Good: Creativity in Bahamian Folklore" was reprinted in 1987 and utilized by the performance-oriented school of Folkloristics.

Field work was also conducted in Trinidad, and it is here that Crowley met his wife, Pearl. Crowley's 1956 paper, "Plural and Differential Acculturation in Trinidad" is an essential work to review on the Caribbean and one of his more influential works."

=== Disability studies ===
The American Anthropological Association, in conjunction with the Crowley family, stated that Daniel was, "a pioneer and advocate for the disabled and role model for all who sought to overcome any kind of handicap." Although he published little on disability, he was a tireless advocate for travelling to engage with his field work and sharing that information upon return that identified Crowley as a primary inspiration for disability studies. Richard Curley of The University of California emphasized this in a statement on Crowley: "Dan became a splendid, and early, role model for the disabled. He spoke candidly of his disability and was a great friend and supporter of many disabled people. His wheelchair never deterred him from visiting the most remote mountain village or attending conferences in out-of-the-way spots. Crowley traveled to the most remote locations, having been in every country of the world, with the exception of Iraq (but not from lack of trying).

As John Michael Vlach and Phillip M. Peek have said in the Journal of American Folklore (1999), "He cleverly and bravely negotiated innumerable physical barriers the likes of which would have caused the able bodied to turn back."

In 1978, the Guinness Book of World Records listed Crowley as "The Most Travelled Disabled Person," – a category that was eventually discontinued.

== Personal life ==
Crowley's maintenance of humour and the positive view he spun on the human condition has been unanimously praised among numerous organizations and publishers. His positive view of life is even more admirable because he once admitted privately to Dr. George Rich that he was never without pain from the braces he wore and the aftermath of polio.

He met Pearl Ramcharan on his first trip to Trinidad and married her soon after. They had three children together – Peter, Eve (Eyzaguirre), and Magdalene.

== Death ==
Dr. Crowley, Dr. George Rich (CSU Sacramento), Cynthia LeCount Samaké (UC Davis) and a research expedition team from the University of California (UREP) traveled to Oruro, Bolivia, to study the major Carnival there. Dr. Crowley enjoyed all four main days of festivities while the local people admired him getting around in his wheel chair with Bolivian helper/friend Oscar Eusebio Apaza. They marveled at his fortitude, and insistence on experiencing every aspect of the Carnival dances, music and costumes. On the morning of Tuesday, February 24, 1998, he died from congestive heart failure exacerbated by the 13,000-foot high altitude. Crowley died in his sleep on the Bolivian day called Martes de Ch'alla, which commemorates the earth goddess, Pachamama.) He died on Fat (Shrove) Tuesday, by which time Bolivian Carnaval dancing had ended, and shopkeepers were blessing their businesses. All the research had been conducted by this time, and the UREP team was about to make the journey home when he died. Dr. Crowley was buried according to his wishes in the country of his demise; his body lies in the Oruro, Bolivia, cemetery.

== Publications ==
- I Could Talk Old-Story Good: Creativity in Bahamian Folklore (1966; reprinted 1983)
- African Folklore in the New World (ed.) (1977, French edition 1988)
- Congolese Sculpture, trans. Of Plastiek van Kongo by Frans Olbrechts, with Pearl Ramcharan-Crowley (1982)
- African Myth and Black Reality in Bahian Carnival (1984)
