= Roger D. Abrahams =

American folklorist

Roger David Abrahams (June 12, 1933 – June 20, 2017) was an American folklorist whose work focused on the expressive cultures and cultural histories of the Americas, with a specific emphasis on African American peoples and traditions.

Abrahams was the Hum Rosen Professor of Humanities Emeritus at the University of Pennsylvania, where he taught in the Department of Folklore and Folklife. He was the author of a large number of books and was the founding Director of Penn's Center for Folklore and Ethnography, a research and public outreach unit associated with the Department of Folklore and Folklife.

== Early life and education ==
Abrahams was born in Philadelphia in 1933 and grew up in a "cultivated, affluent ... family of German-Jewish descent". Abrahams graduated from Swarthmore College in 1955 and then Columbia University in 1959 (M.A. in Literature and Folklore). He then undertook a Ph.D. in English and Folklore at the University of Pennsylvania, which he completed in 1961.

For his Ph.D. research, Abrahams studied forms of speech play he had first encountered from African American Doo-wop singers in South Philadelphia. His Ph.D. - "one of the first studies exploring urban Black expression on its own terms" - formed the basis of his book Deep Down in the Jungle: Negro Narrative Folklore from the Streets of Philadelphia (1970).

== Music ==
For a period, Abrahams lived in Greenwich Village, where he recorded with Dave Van Ronk. As a performer, Abrahams influenced "among others, the young Robert Zimmerman (Bob Dylan)". In 1962, Abrahams released a solo LP, Make Me a Pallet on Your Floor and Other Folk Songs (International, INT 13034).

== Career ==
Abrahams' career began almost immediately after he obtained his Ph.D., first at the University of Texas as instructor (1960–63), assistant professor (1963–66), and then associate professor (1966–69) in the Department of English.

He became a full professor at Texas in 1969 in the departments of English and Anthropology and remained there for ten years. While a professor, he also served for two years beginning in 1968 as the associate director for the Center for Intercultural Studies in Folklore and Oral History and for five years beginning in 1974 as department chairman.

During his time at Texas, Abrahams drew on his research to produce policy documents and teaching materials for the Texas Educational Agency, which refuted the prevailing “deficiency” approach to teaching African American students.

From Texas he moved to Scripps College and Pitzer College in Claremont, California, where he was Alexander H. Kenan Professor of Humanities and Anthropology for six years. In 1986 he returned to the University of Pennsylvania, where he taught Folklore and Folklife and was named the Hum Rosen Professor of Folklore and Folklife, and founded the Center for Folklore and Ethnography, before retiring in 2002.

Abrahams was a strong advocate for public folklore and was major force in the creation of the American Folklife Center of the Library of Congress.

== Influence ==
Abrahams has been described as one of the "first researchers to engage in nuanced intelligent discussions on the folkways of the African Diaspora in the Americas". It has been argued that his early work on speech-patterns, "represented Black speech, and by extension, Black people in a different, more favorable light".

In an obituary in the Journal of American Folklore Abrahams was described as having "the most fertile mind of the grand generation of American folklorists". He was also hailed as a "pioneer of the performance approach [to folklore studies], also contributing to our understanding of folk song, narrative and speech play, proverb and riddle, folk drama and festival, creolization, folklore and literature, folklore theory, and the intellectual history of folklore studies".

== Honors ==
In 1965, he received a Guggenheim Fellowship.

Abrahams was a Fellow of the American Folklore Society and served as its president in 1979. He was awarded the society's Kenneth Goldstein Award for Lifetime Academic Leadership in 2005.

== Selected publications ==
Abrahams, Roger D. 1962. 'Playing the dozens.' The Journal of American Folklore 75 (297):209-220.

Abrahams, Roger D., and Foss, George. 1968. Anglo-American Folksong Style. Englewood Cliffs, NJ: Prentice Hall.

Abrahams, Roger D. 1970. Deep Down in the Jungle: Negro Narrative Folklore from the Streets of Philadelphia. Chicago: Aldine.

Abrahams, Roger D. 1970. 'The Negro Stereotype: Negro Folklore and the Riots'. Journal of American Folklore 83 (328):229–49.

Abrahams, Roger D. 1970. Positively Black. Englewood Cliffs, NJ: Prentice-Hall.

Abrahams, Roger D. 1972. 'Personal Power and Social Restraint in the Definition of Folklore'. In Toward New Perspectives in Folklore, ed. Américo Paredes and Richard Bauman, pp. 16–30. Austin: University of Texas Press.

Abrahams, Roger D. 1976. Man as Animal: The Stereotype in Culture. Bloomington: Indiana University, Folklore Publications Group.

Abrahams, Roger D. 1976 Talking Black. Rowley, MA: Newbury House.

Abrahams, Roger D. ed. 1983. African Folktales: Traditional Stories of the Black World. New York: Pantheon.

Abrahams, Roger D. 1983 The Man-of-Words in the West Indies: Performance and the Emergence of Creole Culture. Baltimore, MD: Johns Hopkins University Press.

Abrahams, Roger D. and Szwed, John F. (eds). 1983. After Africa: Extracts from British Travel Accounts and Journals. New Haven, CT: Yale University Press.

Abrahams, Roger D. (ed.) 1985. Afro-American Folktales: Stories from Black Traditions in the New World. New York: Pantheon.

Abrahams, Roger D. 1987. 'Child Ballads in the West Indies: Familiar Fabulations, Creole Performances'. Journal of Folklore Research 24(2):107–34.

Abrahams, Roger D. 1992. Singing the Master: The Emergence of African American Culture in the Plantation South. New York: Pantheon.

Abrahams, Roger D. 1993. 'Phantoms of Romantic Nationalism in Folkloristics'. Journal of American Folklore 106(419):3–37.

Abrahams, Roger D. 2003. 'Questions of Criolian Contagion'. Journal of American Folklore 116(459):73–87.

Abrahams, Roger D. (2005) Everyday Life: A Poetics of Vernacular Practices. Philadelphia: University of Pennsylvania Press.

Abrahams, Roger D., with Spitzer, Nicholas, Szwed, John F. and Thompson, Robert Farris. 2006. Blues for New Orleans: Mardi Gras and America’s Creole Soul. Philadelphia: University of Pennsylvania Press.
