= Elli Köngäs-Maranda =

Finnish-Canadian anthropologist

Elli-Kaija Köngäs-Maranda (11 January 1932, Tervola, Finland – 1 November 1982, Québec City, Canada) was an internationally renowned anthropologist and feminist folklorist. She studied Finnish language and folklore at the University of Helsinki, where she received her B.A. in 1954 and her M.A. in 1955. She continued her studies in the United States of America and did her doctoral dissertation in 1963 at Indiana University. She was a lecturer at Columbia University and a fellow at the Radcliffe Institute of Harvard University. Köngäs-Maranda was elected a Fellow of the American Folklore Society. The Society's Women's section inaugurated 1983 two prizes in her memory.

== Research ==
Elli Köngäs-Maranda published books on Finnish-American folklore, theory and practice of riddle analysis, myth and art as teaching materials and structural models in folklore, including:

- Elli-Kaija Köngäs-Maranda, Finnish Folklore Reader and Glossary, Indiana University Publications: Uralic and Altaic Series, 71/Research and Studies in Uralic and Altaic Languages: Project No. 74 (Bloomington: Indiana University, [1968])
- Elli Köngäs Maranda and Pierre Maranda (eds), Structural Models in Folklore and Transformational Essays, Approaches to Semiotics, 10/University of Pennsylvania Publications in Folklore and Folklife, 3 (The Hague: Mouton, 1971/Philadelphia, University of Pennsylvania Press [1971])

== Personal life ==
The Canadian anthropologist Pierre Maranda was her husband with whom she had two sons: the oldest is Erik and youngest is musician Nicolas Maranda.
