= Rayna Green =

American folklorist and curator

Rayna Diane Green (born 1942) is an American curator and folklorist. She is Curator Emerita, in the Division of Cultural and Community Life at the National Museum of American History, Smithsonian Institution.

Her research expertise is on American Indian representations, the history of American Indian women, American identity, and American foodways - topics which she has explored through exhibitions, published research, film making and music compilations.

== Early life and education ==
Green was born in Dallas, Texas in 1942. She graduated with a B.A., in American Literature from Southern Methodist University in 1963 and then an M.A. in American Studies from the same institution in 1966. She undertook a Ph.D. in Folklore and American Studies at Indiana University Bloomington, which she completed in 1973. Green was the first American Indian to receive a Ph.D. in that field.

Between 1964 and 1966, Green was a Peace Corps Volunteer in Ethiopia.

== Career ==
Green worked for a number in years in academia, including posts at the University of Arkansas and University of Massachusetts. Between 1976 and 1980 she was Director of the Project on Native Americans in Science for the American Association for the Advancement of Science and between 1980 and 1984 she was associate professor of Native American Studies at Dartmouth College, In 1984 Green began work at the National Museum of American History as a consultant, before becoming director of the American Indian Program in 1986.

Green produced many public programs at the museum, including performance programs on Native dance and song and symposiums on contemporary Native art, science and technology. She curated a number of exhibitions, including "American Encounters"; “Bon Appétit: Julia Child’s Kitchen at the Smithsonian"; “Food: Transforming the American Table, 1950-2000”.

Green was involved as scriptwriter and director of three documentary short films on Pueblo life and culture: We Are Here: 500 Years of Pueblo Resistance (1992), which was awarded the Ciné Golden Eagle, in 1992; Corn Is Who We Are: The Story of Pueblo Indian Food (1995) which was awarded the Silver Apple, National Educational Film Festival, in 1995 and From Ritual to Retail: Pueblos, Tourism, and the Fred Harvey Company (1995), which was produced to tie in with the exhibition, Inventing the Southwest: The Fred Harvey Company and Native American Art.

She also co-ordinated two audio recordings of Native women's music: Heartbeat: The Voices of First Nations Women (Smithsonian Folkways, 1995) and Heartbeat 2: More Voices of First Nations Women (Smithsonian Folkways, 1998).

Green has written or edited four books (Native American Women: A Contextual Bibliography (1983); That’s What She Said: Contemporary Fiction and Poetry By Native American Women (editor, 1984); Women in American Indian Society (1992); The British Museum Encyclopedia of Native North America (1999) and is also the author of many academic articles.

She was made Curator Emerita at the National Museum of American History in 2014.

== Recognition ==
Green served as president of the American Folklore Society between 1986 and 1987. She is a former councillor of the American Society for Ethnohistory and a founding member of both the Cherokee Honor Society and the American Indian Science and Engineering Society.

In 2008, she was Leman Brady Professor at the Center for Documentary Studies at Duke University.

== Selected publications ==
- Green, Rayna (1975). "The Pocahontas Perplex: The Image of Indian Women in American Culture". The Massachusetts Review. 16 (4): pages 698–714. ISSN 0025-4878.
- Green, Rayna; Malcom, Shirley Mahaley (1976). "AAAS Project on Native Americans in Science". Science. 194 (4265): pages 597–598. ISSN 0036-8075.
- Green, Rayna (1977). "Magnolias Grow in Dirt: The Bawdy Lore of Southern Women". The Radical Teacher (6): 26–31. ISSN 0191-4847.
- Green, R. (1980). Native American Women. Signs, 6(2), pages 248–267. ISSN 0097-9740.
- Green, Rayna (1983). Native American women: a contextual bibliography. Bloomington: Indiana University Press. ISBN 978-0-253-33976-8. OCLC 465513222.
- Green, Rayna (1984). That's what she said: contemporary poetry and fiction by Native American women. ISBN 978-0-253-35855-4. OCLC 10402837.
- Green, Rayna (1988). "The Tribe Called Wannabee: Playing Indian in America and Europe". Folklore. 99 (1): pages 30–55. ISSN 0015-587X
- Green, Rayna (1991). "The Mickey Mouse Kachina". American Art. 5 (1/2): pages 208–209. ISSN 1073-9300.
- Green, R. (1990) 'American Indian Women: Diverse Leadership for Social Change', in Albrecht and Brewer, eds. Bridges of Power: Women's Multicultural Alliances. Santa Cruz, California: New Society Publishers.ISBN 978-0-86571-183-9. OCLC 22595239.
- Green, R. (1991) Women in American Indian Society. Chelsea House Publishers, New York. ISBN 978-1-55546-734-0. OCLC 23975100.
- Green, R. (1991) 'On Looking in the Mirror of An Institution'. Virginia Foundation for the Humanities and Public Policy Newsletter; reprinted in Northeast Indian Quarterly, Summer, 1990; The Graduate Quill, SUNY/Buffalo, April, 1991.
- Green, R. (1992) 'Rosebuds of the Plateau: Frank Matsura and the Fainting Couch Aesthetic', in Lucy Lippard, ed. Partial Recall: Photographs of Native North Americans. New York: New Press. ISBN 1-56584-016-X. OCLC 26767689
- Green, R. (1992) 'Mythologizing Pocahontas' In Carol E. Robertson. Musical Repercussions of 1492: Encounters in Text and Performance. Washington, DC: Smithsonian Institution Press. ISBN 978-1-56098-183-1. OCLC 925195993.
- Green, R. (1992) 'Red Earth People and Southeastern Basketry", in Linda Mowat, ed. Basketmakers: Meaning and Form in Native American Baskets. Oxford, England: Pitt Rivers Museum. ISBN 978-0-902793-26-2. OCLC 1043185639.
- Green, R. (1993) 'Repatriating Images: Indians and Photography', Rendezvous 28. Numbers 1 and 2 (Spring/Fall, 1993). Pages 151–158.
- Green, R. (1993) 'Culture and Gender in Indian America." in Patricia Hill Collins and Margaret Anderson, eds. Race, Culture and Gender: An Anthology. Belmont, Ca., Wadsworth Publishing Co., 1994.
- Green, R. (1993) "Grass Don't Grow On a Racetrack and Other Paradigms for Folklore and Feminism", Introduction to Jane Young et al., eds. Folklife and Feminist Theory, University of Illinois Press, 1993
- Green, R. (1996) 'We Never Saw These Things Before': Southwest Indian Laughter and Resistance to the Invasion of the Tse va ho', in M. Weigle. The Great Southwest of the Fred Harvey Company and the Santa Fe Railway. Phoenix: The Heard Museum, ISBN 978-0-934351-49-2. OCLC 1075629669.
- Green, R. (1999) 'A Modest Proposal: The Museum of the Plains White Person', in Robert Torricelli, Andrew Carroll, and Doris Kearns Goodwin, eds. In Our Own Words: Greatest Speeches of The American Century. Kodansha America, Inc., 1999. ISBN 978-1-56836-291-5. OCLC 490992849.
- Green, Rayna; Fernandez, Melanie (1999). The British Museum encyclopaedia of native North America. London: British Museum Press. ISBN 978-0-7141-2543-5. OCLC 43086553.
- Green, Rayna (2000-03-01). "Gertrude Käsebier's 'Indian' Photographs". History of Photography. 24 (1): pages 58–60. doi:10.1080/03087298.2000.10443366. ISSN 0308-7298.
- Green, R. (2008). "Mother Corn and the Dixie Pig: Native Food in the Native South". Southern Cultures. 14 (4): pages 114–126. ISSN 1068-8218.
- Green, Rayna (2012-11-21), 'Public Histories of Food' in Pilcher, Jeffrey M. (ed.). The Oxford Handbook of Food History. Oxford University Press. doi:10.1093/oxfordhb/9780199729937.013.0005.
- Green, Rayna (2018). "School Days for Me and the Museum: Commentary on Remembering Our Indian School Days, a Landmark Exhibit at the Heard Museum". Journal of American Indian Education. 57 (1): pages 30–36. doi:10.5749/jamerindieduc.57.1.0030. ISSN 0021-8731.
