= C. Kurt Dewhurst =

American curator and folklorist

- Born: 1948 (age 77–78); Passaic, New Jersey, United States
- Education: Michigan State University (MA)

C. Kurt Dewhurst (born 1948) is an American curator and folklorist. Dewhurst is Director for Arts and Cultural Partnerships at Michigan State University and also a Senior Fellow in University Outreach and Engagement. At MSU, he is also Director Emeritus of the Michigan State University Museum and a Professor of English and Museum Studies.

== Early life and education ==
Dewhurst was born in Passaic, New Jersey.

Dewhurst attended Michigan State University where he graduated with a BA in 1970 and an MA in 1973. He received his doctorate from the same institution in 1983, from the Department of English and American Studies. His PhD thesis was titled 'The folk pottery-making tradition of Grand Ledge, Michigan : a material folk culture study'.

== Career ==
Dewhurst has been involved with Michigan State University Museum since the 1970s: working as a curator there from 1976 before becoming director in 1982.

Dewhurst has authored or co-authored numerous books, articles, and exhibition catalogues. He has also curated over 60 exhibitions and festival programs. His research interests include folk arts, material culture, cultural economic development, and cultural heritage policy.

He has frequently collaborated on projects with his wife Marsha MacDowell, who is a Professor of Art History at MSU.

== Recognition ==
Dewhurst served as president of the American Folklore Society (AFS) between 2010 and 2011. His 2011 Presidential Address was titled, "Folklife and Museum Practice: An Intertwined History and Emerging Convergences". In 2011 he was elected a Fellow of the AFS. In 2004 he was jointly awarded the AFS's Américo Paredes Prize for "integrating scholarship and engagement with the people and communities".

Dewhurst has chaired a number of cultural organisations and associations including the board of trustees for the American Folklife Center; the advisory council of the Smithsonian Center for Folklife and Cultural Heritage and the Michigan Council for the Arts and Cultural Affairs.

He is an advisor to three cultural heritage projects in South Africa: the Nelson Mandela Museum in Mthatha; the Ahmed Kathrada Foundation in Johannesburg and the Desmond and Leah Tutu Legacy Foundation in Cape Town.

Dewhurst received a Fulbright Grant to work in Thailand with the National Culture Commission of Thailand. He has also participated in the French-American Foundation Arts Administrators Exchange Program in France.

In 2004, the Great Lakes Folk Festival - begun by Dewhurst and MacDowell in 1987 - was recognized as "one of the most outstanding projects" over the 30-year history of the Michigan Humanities Council.

In 2018 Dewhurst and Marsha MacDowell were jointly awarded the MSU Charles Gliozzo Award for International Diplomacy.

He is a key member of the US-Africa Cultural Heritage Strategic Partnership, which is focused on "preserving ...and making accessible the heritage of Africa's many cultures" and also the US/China Folklife and Intangible Cultural Heritage Partnership project.

== Selected exhibitions ==
Dewhurst has curated numerous exhibitions and festival programs including:

- "To Honor and Comfort: Native Quilting Traditions" (a collaborative project between the National Museum of the American Indian and Michigan State University Museum), National Museum of the American Indian, New York, New York, October 16, 1997 - January 4, 1998.
- "Caught on the Fly: Fly Fishing Traditions in Michigan," MSU Museum, 1999.
- "Carriers of Culture: Living Native Basket Traditions" program at Smithsonian Folklife Festival, 2006.
- "Dear Mr. Mandela/Dear Mrs. Parks" Exhibit, (collaborative with the MSU Museum and Nelson Mandela Museum), Mthatha, South Africa, 2008.
- “Ahmed Kathrada: A South African Activist for Non-Racialism and Democracy." Michigan State University Museum, East Lansing, MI. 2013.
- “Sun-up to Sundown: Selections from the Our Daily Work/Our Daily Lives Collection,” Michigan State University Museum. 2013.
- “Nani I Ka Hala: The Vibrancy and Vitality of Lau Hala Weaving in Hawaii.” Bishop Museum, Honolulu, and Maui Arts and Cultural Center, HA. 2015.

== Selected publications ==
- Dewhurst, C. Kurt; MacDowell, Betty; MacDowell, Marsha (1979). Artists in aprons: folk art by American women. New York: Dutton. ISBN 978-0-525-05857-1. OCLC 4680626.
- Dewhurst, C. Kurt; MacDowell, Betty; MacDowell, Marsha; Museum of American Folk Art (1983). Religious folk art in America: reflections of faith. New York: E.P. Dutton in association with the Museum of American Folk Art. OCLC 1151143914.
- Dewhurst, C. Kurt, Marsha MacDowell. (1997) Carriers of Culture: Native Quilting Traditions. Museum of New Mexico Press. ISBN 0-89013-316-6. OCLC 37261019.
- Dewhurst, C. Kurt. (2002). "Rethinking Collaboration: Lessons from the Field," in Julie Avery, ed. Rooted in Place: Community Arts and Culture. East Lansing, Michigan: Michigan State University Museum and Michigan Council for the Arts and Cultural Affairs. OCLC 607730239.
- Dewhurst, C. Kurt, Marsha L. MacDowell, and Marjorie Hunt. (2006). “Carriers of Culture: Living Native Basket Traditions.” in Frank Proschan, ed. Smithsonian Folklife Festival Annual. Washington, DC: Smithsonian Center for Folklife and Cultural Heritage, pp. 46–62. OCLC 427642113.
- Dewhurst, C. Kurt, Marsha MacDowell, and Narissa Ramdhani, (2008). “Lessons Lived and Learned in Developing and Managing a Bi-National Cultural Heritage Sector Project in South Africa,” 2008. Museum Anthropology Review. Vol. 2, No. 1.
- Dewhurst, C. Kurt. (2011).“Folklife and Museums: A Force for the Construction of a New Cultural Ecology.” Journal of Cultural Heritage. Key Research Institute of Humanities and Social Sciences in Universities and Institute of Chinese Intangible Heritage, Sun Yat-sen University, Guangzhou, China. Vol. 1. pp 100–104.
- Dewhurst, C. Kurt, Marsha MacDowell, and Kate Wells. (2012). Siyazama : art, AIDS, and education in South Africa. Kate Wells. Scottsville, South Africa: University of KwaZulu-Natal Press. 2012. ISBN 978-1-86914-222-3. OCLC 780032845.
- Dewhurst, C. Kurt and Marsha MacDowell. (2013). Going Public through International Museum Partnerships. in Going Public: Civic and Community Engagement (eds. Hiram Fitzgerald and Judy Primavera, East Lansing: Michigan State University Press. doi:10.14321/j.ctt7ztbxd.19. ISBN 978-1-61186-089-4.
- Dewhurst, C. Kurt (2014-01-01). "Folklife and Museum Practice: An Intertwined History and Emerging Convergences". Journal of American Folklore. 127 (505): 247–263. doi:10.5406/jamerfolk.127.505.0247. ISSN 0021-8715.
- Dewhurst, C. Kurt, Lia Keawe, and Marsha MacDowell (2014). Ike Ulana Lau Hala: The Vitality and Vibrancy of Lau Hala Weaving Traditions in Hawaii. Honolulu: University of Hawaii Press. 2014. ISBN 978-0-8248-6848-2. OCLC 986749957.
- Dewhurst, C., Kurt, Diana Baird N-Diaye, and Marsha MacDowell (2015) “Cultivating Connectivity: Moving Toward Inclusive Excellence in Museums”. Curator: The Museum Journal. 57 (4): 455–472. doi:10.1111/cura.12085. ISSN 0011-3069.
- Dewhurst, C. Kurt and Marsha MacDowell (2015). “Memories of Robben Island Visit with Ahmed Kathrada. Triumph of the Spirit: Ahmed Kathrada and Robben Island. NZ: PQ Blackwell with the Ahmed Kathrada Foundation.
- Dewhurst, C. Kurt; MacDowell, Marsha (2015-07-01). "Strategies for Creating and Sustaining Museum-Based International Collaborative Partnerships". Practicing Anthropology. 37 (3): 54–55. doi:10.17730/0888-4552-37.3.54. ISSN 0888-4552.
- Dewhurst, C. Kurt and Lynne Swanson. (2016). “A Commitment to Textile Traditions: The Michigan State University Museum, East Lansing, MI.” Quilts of Southwest China Marsha MacDowell and Lijun Zhang (eds.). Nanning: Guangxi Museum of Nationalities. pp. 62–65. ISBN 978-7-219-09830-1. OCLC 965830530.
- Dewhurst, C. Kurt and Marsha MacDowell (2016). Introduction, Curatorial Conversations: Cultural Representation and the Smithsonian Folklife Festival.Olivia Cadaval, Sojin Kim, and Diana Baird N’Diaye (eds.). Oxford: University of Mississippi Press. pp. 3–10. ISBN 978-1-4968-1473-9. OCLC 1064645810.
- Dewhurst, C. Kurt, Patty Hall, and Charles Seemann (eds).) (2017). Museums and Folklife: Twenty First Century Perspectives, Rowman and Littlefield Press. ISBN 978-1-4422-7291-0. OCLC 953919002.
- Dewhurst, C. Kurt; Lloyd, Timothy (2019-03-13). "The American Folklore Society-China Folklore Society Folklore and Intangible Cultural Heritage Project, 2013-2016". Museum Anthropology Review. 13 (1–2): 59–68. doi:10.14434/mar.v13i1.25405. ISSN 1938-5145.
- Dewhurst, C. Kurt and Marsha MacDowell. 2019 “Art, Aesthetics, and Crafts". in Simon J, Bronner (ed.) Oxford Handbook of American Folklore and Folklife Studies. Chapter 14, London: Oxford University Press. ISBN 978-0-19-084061-7. OCLC 1128414609.
