= American Folklore Society =

American academic society that gathers the work of folklorists

- Abbreviation: AFS
- Formation: 1888
- Founder: William Wells Newell, Francis James Child
- Type: Professional association
- Headquarters: Bloomington, Indiana
- Location: United States
- President: Jason Baird Jackson
- Key people: Jessica A. Turner (Executive Director)
- Website: americanfolkloresociety.org

The American Folklore Society (AFS) is the United States (US)-based professional association for folklorists. With members from the US, Canada, and around the world, the organization aims to encourage research, aid in disseminating that research, promote the responsible application of that research, publish various forms of publications, and advocate for the continued study and teaching of folklore. The Society is based at Indiana University and has an annual meeting every October. The Society's quarterly publication is the Journal of American Folklore. The current president is Jason Baird Jackson.

As of 2016, almost half of its 2,200 members practice their work outside higher education. In addition to professors, members include public folklorists, arts administrators, freelance researchers, librarians, museum curators, and others involved in the study and promotion of folklore and traditional culture.

== History ==
AFS was founded in 1888 by William Wells Newell, who stood at the center of a diverse group of university-based scholars, museum anthropologists, and men and women of letters and affairs. In 1945, the society became a member of the American Council of Learned Societies. AFS is also an active member of the National Humanities Alliance (NHS).

Over the years, prominent members of the American Folklore Society known outside academic circles have included Marius Barbeau, Franz Boas, Ben Botkin, Jan Harold Brunvand, Linda Dégh, Ella Deloria, William Ferris, John Miles Foley, Joel Chandler Harris, Zora Neale Hurston, James P. Leary, Alan Lomax, John A. Lomax, Kay Turner, and Mark Twain. Past presidents have included Samuel Preston Bayard, Henry Glassie, Diane Goldstein, Dorothy Noyes, and Dell Hymes.

=== Past Presidents ===
- 1888–89 Francis James Child
- 1890 Daniel Garrison Brinton
- 1891 Otis T. Mason
- 1892 Frederic Ward Putnam
- 1893 Horatio Hale
- 1894 Alcée Fortier
- 1895 Washington Matthews
- 1896 John G. Bourke
- 1897 Stewart Culin
- 1898 Henry Wood
- 1899 Charles L. Edwards
- 1900 Franz Boas
- 1901 Frank Russell
- 1902 George Dorsey
- 1903 Livingston Farrand
- 1904 George Lyman Kittredge
- 1905 Alice C. Fletcher
- 1906 Alfred L. Kroeber
- 1907–8 Roland B. Dixon
- 1909 John R. Swanton
- 1910–11 Henry M. Belden
- 1912–13 John A. Lomax
- 1914–15 Pliny Earle Goddard
- 1916–17 Robert H. Lowie
- 1918 C. Marius Barbeau
- 1919–20 Elsie Clews Parsons
- 1921–22 Frank G. Speck
- 1923–24 Aurelio M. Espinosa
- 1925–26 Louise Pound
- 1927–28 Alfred M. Tozzer
- 1929–30 Edward Sapir
- 1931 Franz Boas
- 1932–33 Martha W. Beckwith
- 1934 Franz Boas
- 1935–36 Archer Taylor
- 1937–39 Stith Thompson
- 1940–41 A. Irving Hallowell
- 1942 Harold W. Thompson
- 1944 Benjamin A. Botkin
- 1945 Melville J. Herskovits
- 1946–47 Joseph M. Carrière
- 1948 Erminie Wheeler-Voegelin
- 1949 Thelma G. James
- 1950 Anna H. Gayton
- 1951–52 Francis Lee Utley
- 1953–54 William R. Bascom
- 1955–56 Herbert Halpert
- 1957–58 Wayland D. Hand
- 1959–60 William N. Fenton
- 1961–62 MacEdward Leach
- 1963–64 Melville Jacobs
- 1965–66 Samuel P. Bayard
- 1967–68 Richard M. Dorson
- 1969–70 Daniel J. Crowley
- 1971–72 D.K. Wilgus
- 1973–74 Dell Hymes
- 1975–76 Kenneth S. Goldstein
- 1977 Ellen Stekert
- 1978 J. Barre Toelken
- 1979 Roger D. Abrahams
- 1980 Alan Dundes
- 1981 Don Yoder
- 1982 Linda Dégh
- 1983 W.F.H. Nicolaisen
- 1984 Bruce Jackson
- 1985 Jan Harold Brunvand
- 1986 Rayna Green
- 1987 Judith McCulloh
- 1988 Alan Jabbour
- 1989–90 Henry Glassie
- 1991–92 Barbara Kirshenblatt-Gimblett
- 1993–94 Sylvia Grider
- 1995–96 Jane Beck
- 1997–98 John Roberts
- 1999-2000 Jo Radner
- 2001 Peggy A. Bulger
- 2002-2003 Jack Santino
- 2004-2005 Michael Owen Jones
- 2006-2007 Bill Ivey
- 2008–2009 Elaine Lawless
- 2010-2011 C. Kurt Dewhurst
- 2012–2013 Diane Goldstein
- 2014-2015 Michael Ann Williams
- 2016-2017 Kay Turner
- 2018-2019 Dorothy Noyes
- 2020-2021 Norma Cantú
- 2022-2023 Marilyn M. White
- 2023-2024 Amy Skillman

== Awards ==
AFS awards various prizes to honor outstanding work in the field of folklore, at the opening ceremony of the annual AFS meeting. These include the following:

- The Zora Neale Hurston Prize is awarded annually and honors the best student work in the field of African American folklore.
- The Américo Paredes Prize is awarded annually and honors excellence in integrating scholarship and engagement with local communities.
- The Benjamin A. Botkin Prize is awarded annually to honor outstanding achievements by folklorists working in the field of public folklore.
- The Chicago Folklore Prize is awarded annually and honors author(s) for the best scholarly monograph in folklore.

Other prizes are awarded annually, by different sections of the American Folklore Society.

- The Women's Section, inaugurated in 1983, awards two prizes in the memory of anthropologist Elli Köngäs-Maranda.
- The Children's Folklore Section awards the annual W. W. Newell Prize, for the best student essay. It also awards the Iona and Peter Opie Prize approximately every two years to the author of the best recently published scholarly book on children's folklore and annually awards the Aesop Prize and Aesop Accolades.
- The History and Folklore Section awards the biennial Wayland D. Hand Prize for an outstanding book that combines historical and folkloristic perspectives and the Richard Reuss Prize for students of folklore and history.

Every other year (in alternating years), AFS awards the following prizes:

- The American Folklore Society Lifetime Scholarly Achievement Award (even-numbered years) honors folklorists for outstanding accomplishments over a career of scholarship.
- The Kenneth Goldstein Award for Lifetime Academic Leadership (odd-numbered years) honors those who have made contributions to supporting academic programs in folklore for outstanding achievement.

== See also ==
- Folklife
- Folkloristics
- Public folklore
- Museum folklore
- Folklore of the United States
