= Journal of American Folklore =

Academic journal on American folklore

- Discipline: Folklore
- Language: English
- Edited by: Lisa Girman

Publication details
- History: 1888–present
- Publisher: University of Illinois Press for the American Folklore Society (United States)
- Frequency: Quarterly

Standard abbreviations
- ISO 4: J. Am. Folk.

Indexing
- ISSN: 0021-8715 (print); 1535-1882 (web)
- LCCN: 2002-227249
- JSTOR: 00218715
- OCLC no.: 67084841

Links
- Journal homepage; Online access; Journal page at society website

The Journal of American Folklore is a peer-reviewed academic journal published by the American Folklore Society. The journal has been published since the society's founding in 1888. Since 2003, this has been published at the University of Illinois Press. It publishes on a quarterly schedule and incorporates scholarly articles, essays, and notes relating to its field. It also includes reviews of books, exhibitions and events.

== History ==
The Journal of American Folklore was first published in 1888 by the American Folklore Society (AFS), which was founded in 1888 by Francis James Child, a Harvard University professor and folklorist. The AFS aimed to promote the study and collection of American folklore, as well as to publish scholarly articles on the subject.

== Editors ==
The following people have been editor-in-chief of the journal:

- William Wells Newell (1888–1899), vols. 1–12
- Alexander Francis Chamberlain (1900–1907), vols. 13–20
- Franz Boas (1908–1924), vols. 21–37
- Ruth Fulton Benedict (1925–1939), vols. 38–52
- Gladys Reichard (1940), vol.53
- Archer Taylor (1941), vol. 54
- Erminie Wheeler-Voegelin (1942–1946), vols. 55–59
- Wayland Debs Hand (1947–1951), vols. 60–64
- Katharine Luomala (1952–1953), vols. 65–66
- Thomas A. Sebeok (1954–1958), vols. 67–71
- Richard M. Dorson (1959–1963), vols. 72–76
- John Greenway (1964–1968), vols. 77–81
- Américo Paredes (1969–1973), vols. 82–86
- Barre Toelken (1974–1976), vols. 87–89
- Jan Harold Brunvand (1977–1980), vols. 90–93
- Richard Bauman (1981–1985), vols. 94–98
- Bruce Jackson (1986–1990), vols. 99–103
- Burt Feintuch (1991–1995), vols. 104–108
- Jack Santino (1996–2000), 109–113
- Elaine J. Lawless (2000–2005), vols. 114–118
- Harris M. Berger and Giovanna P. Del Negro (2006–2010), vols. 119–123
- Thomas A. DuBois and James P. Leary (2011–2015), vols. 124–128
- Ann K. Ferrell (2016–2020), vols. 129–133
- Lisa Gilman (2021– ), vol. 134–
