= Folklore studies =

Branch of anthropology

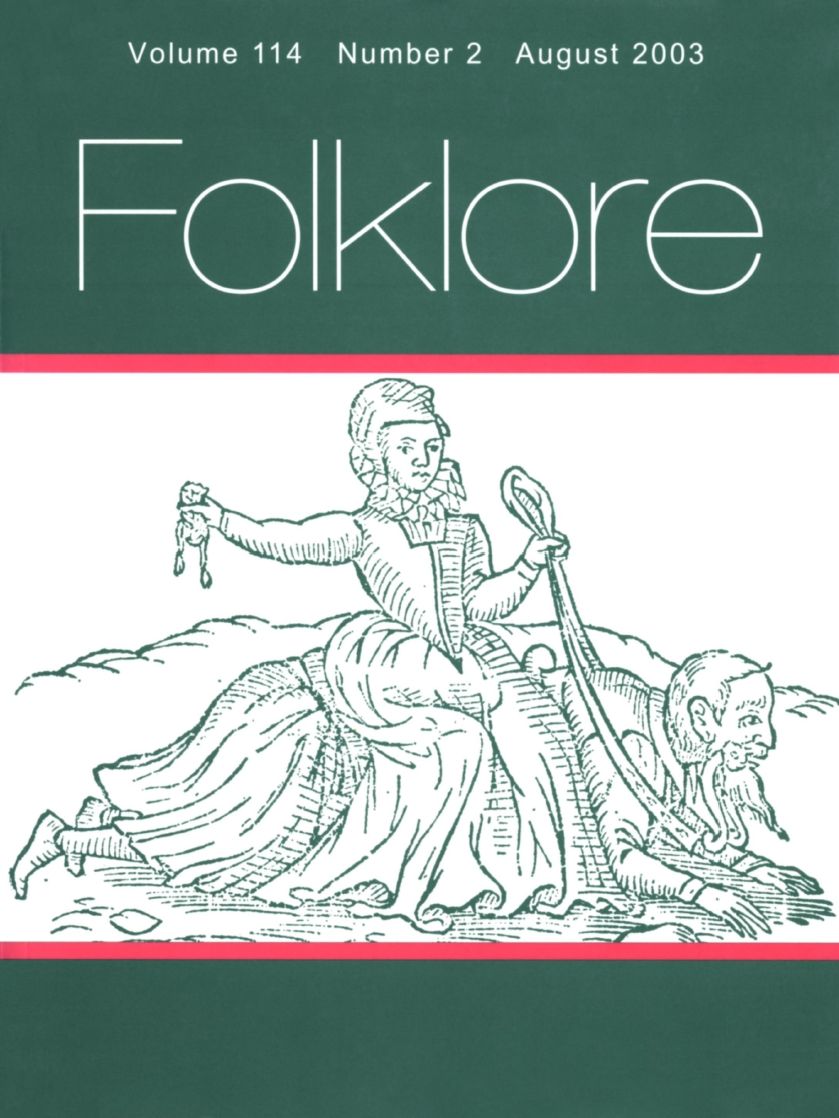
Front cover of Folklore: "He loses his hat: Judith Philips riding a man", from: The Brideling, Sadling, and Ryding, of a rich Churle in Hampshire (1595)

Folklore studies (also known as folkloristics, tradition studies or folk life studies in the UK) is the academic discipline devoted to the study of folklore. This term, along with its synonyms, (Note: According to Alan Dundes, this term was first introduced in an address by Charles Leland in 1889. He spoke in German to the Hungarian Folklore Society and referenced "Die Folkloristik". In contemporary scholarship, the word Folkloristics is favored by Alan Dundes, and used in the title of his publication. The term Folklore Studies is defined and used by Simon Bronner.) gained currency in the 1950s to distinguish the academic study of traditional culture from the folklore artifacts themselves. It became established as a field across both Europe and North America, coordinating with Volkskunde (German), folkeminner (Norwegian), and folkminnen (Swedish), among others.

== Overview ==
A 1982 UNESCO document titled "Recommendation on the Safeguarding of Traditional Culture and Folklore" declared a global need to establish provisions protecting folklore from varying dangers identified in the document. UNESCO further published the Convention for the Safeguarding of the Intangible Cultural Heritage in 2003. The American Folklife Preservation Act (P.L. 94-201) passed in 1976 by the United States Congress in conjunction with the Bicentennial Celebration included a definition of folklore, also called folklife:

"...[Folklife] means the traditional expressive culture shared within the various groups in the United States: familial, ethnic, occupational, religious, regional; expressive culture includes a wide range of creative and symbolic forms such as custom, belief, technical skill, language, literature, art, architecture, music, play, dance, drama, ritual, pageantry, handicraft; these expressions are mainly learned orally, by imitation, or in performance, and are generally maintained without benefit of formal instruction or institutional direction."

This law in conjunction with other legislation was designed to protect the natural and cultural heritage of the United States in alignment with efforts to promote and protect the cultural diversity of the United States and recognize it as a national strength and a resource worthy of protection.

The term folklore contains component parts folk and lore. The word folk originally applied to rural, frequently poor and illiterate peasants. A contemporary definition of folk is a social group which includes two or more persons with common traits, who express their shared identity through distinctive traditions. "Folk is a flexible concept which can refer to a nation as in American folklore or to a single family." This expanded social definition of folk expands the material considered to be folklore artifacts to include "things people make with words (verbal lore), things they make with their hands (material lore), and things they make with their actions (customary lore)". The folklorist studies the traditional artifacts of a group and the groups within which these customs, traditions and beliefs are transmitted.

Transmission of folk artifacts is necessary to their preservation over time outside of study by cultural archaeologists. Beliefs and customs are passed informally within a folk group mainly anonymously and in multiple variants. This is in contrast to high culture, characterized by recognition by the elites of a given society and identified as specific works created by individuals.

The folklorist studies the significance of these beliefs, customs and objects for the group. In folklore studies "folklore means something – to the tale teller, to the song singer, to the fiddler, and to the audience or addressees". The field assumes cultural units would not be passed along unless they had some continued relevance within the group, though their meaning can shift and morph with time.

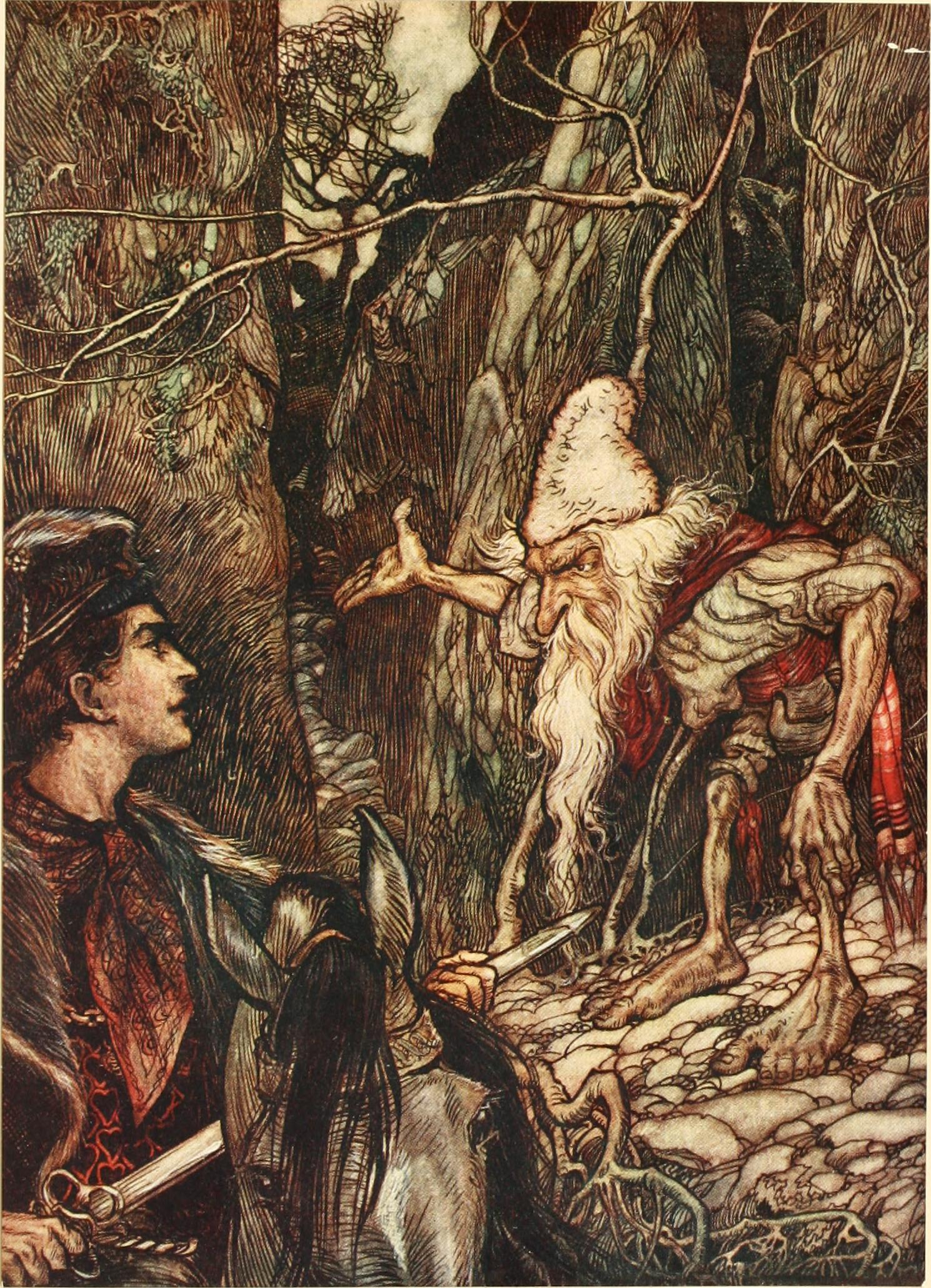
Brothers Grimm (1916)

Folklore is a naturally occurring and necessary component of any social group. Folklore does not need to be old; it continues through the modern day. It is created, transmitted, and used to establish "us" and "them" within a given group. The unique nature of a culture's folklore requires the development of methods of study by the culture at hand for effective identification and research. As a modern academic discipline, folklore studies straddles the space between the social sciences and the humanities.

The study of folklore originated in Europe in the first half of the 19th century with a focus on the oral folklore of the rural peasant populations. The "Kinder- und Hausmärchen" of the Brothers Grimm, first published 1812, is the best known collection of the verbal folklore of the European peasantry. This interest in stories, sayings and songs, i.e. verbal lore, continued throughout the 19th century and aligned the fledgling discipline of folklore studies with literature and mythology. By the turn of the 20th century, European folklorists remained focused on the oral folklore of the homogeneous peasant populations in their regions, while the American folklorists, led by Franz Boas, chose to consider Native American cultures in their research, and included the totality of their customs and beliefs as folklore. This distinction aligned American folklore studies with cultural anthropology and ethnology. American folklorists thus used the same data collection techniques as these fields in their own field research. This diverse alliance of folklore studies with other academic fields offers a variety of theoretical vantage points and research tools to the field of folklore studies, even as it continues to be a point of discussion within the field.

Public folklore is a relatively new offshoot of folklore studies, starting after the Second World War and modeled on the work of Alan Lomax and Ben Botkin in the 1930s. Lomax and Botkin emphasized applied folklore, with modern public sector folklorists working to document, preserve and present the beliefs and customs of diverse cultural groups in their region. These positions are often affiliated with museums, libraries, arts organizations, public schools, historical societies, etc. The most renowned of these is the American Folklife Center at the Smithsonian, which hosts the Smithsonian Folklife Festival every summer in Washington, DC. Public folklore differentiates itself from the academic folklore supported by universities, in which collection, research and analysis are the primary goals.

== Terminology ==
The field of folklore studies uses a wide-variety of sometimes synonymous terms. Folklore was the original term used in this discipline. Its synonym, folklife, came into circulation in the second half of the 20th century, at a time when some researchers felt that the term folklore was too closely tied exclusively to oral lore. The new term folklife, along with its synonym folk culture, is meant to include all aspects of a culture, not just the oral traditions. Folk process is used to describe the refinement and creative change of artifacts by community members within the folk tradition that defines the folk process. Professionals within this field, regardless of the other words they use, consider themselves to be folklorists.

Other terms which might be confused with folklore are popular culture and vernacular culture. However, pop culture tends to be in demand for a limited time, mass-produced and communicated using mass media. Individually, these tend to be labeled fads, and disappear as quickly as they appear. The term vernacular culture differs from folklore in its overriding emphasis on a specific locality or region. For example, vernacular architecture denotes the standard building form of a region, using the materials available and designed to address functional needs of the local economy. Folk architecture is a subset of this, in which the construction is not done by a professional architect or builder, but by an individual putting up a needed structure in the local style. Therefore, all folklore is vernacular culture, but not all vernacular culture necessarily folklore.

In addition to these terms, folklorism refers to "material or stylistic elements of folklore [presented] in a context which is foreign to the original tradition." This definition, offered by the folklorist Hermann Bausinger, does not discount the validity of meaning expressed in these "second hand" traditions. Many Walt Disney films and products belong in this category of folklorism; fairy tales become animated film characters, stuffed animals and bed linens. These manifestations of folklore traditions have their own significance for their audience.

Fakelore refers to artifacts which might be termed pseudo-folklore, manufactured items claiming to be traditional. The folklorist Richard Dorson coined this word, clarifying it in his book "Folklore and Fakelore". Current thinking within the discipline is that this term places undue emphasis on the origination of the artifact as a sign of authenticity of the tradition. Adjacently, the adjective folkloric is used to designate materials having the character of folklore or tradition, at the same time making no claim to authenticity.

== Methodology ==
There are several goals of active folklore research. The first objective is to identify tradition bearers within a social group and to collect their lore, preferably in situ. Once collected, these data need to be documented and preserved to enable further access and study. The documented lore is then available to be analyzed and interpreted by folklorists and other cultural historians, and can become the basis for studies of either individual customs or comparative studies. There are multiple venues, be they museums, journals or folk festivals to present the research results. The final step in this methodology involves advocating for these groups in their distinctiveness.

The specific tools needed by folklorists to do their research are manifold.

- The researchers must be comfortable in fieldwork; going out to meet their informants where they live, work, and perform.
- They need to access archives housing a vast array of unpublished folklore collections.
- They will want to work with folk museums, to both view the collections, and present their own findings.
- Bibliographies maintained by libraries and on line contain an important trove of articles from around the world.
- The use of indexes allow them to view and use the categorization of artifacts which have already been established.
- All work by a folklorist must be appropriately annotated in order to provide identifiable sources of the work.
- For all folklorists terminology becomes a skill to master as they rub elbows not only with related academic fields but also with the colloquial understanding (what exactly is a fairy tale?). This shared vocabulary, with varying and sometimes divergent shades of meaning, needs to be used thoughtfully and consistently.
- The use of printed sources to locate and identify further variants of a folk tradition is a necessary adjunct to the field research.
- Because the transmission of folk artifacts preceded and ignored the establishment of national and political boundaries, it is important to cultivate international connections to folklorists in neighboring countries and around the world to compare both the artifacts researched and the methodology used.
- A knowledge of the history of folklore studies is called for to identify the direction and more importantly the biases which the field has taken in the past, enabling us to temper the current analysis with more impartiality. (Note: In a more dramatic and less technical approach, Henry Glassie describes the tools of the folklore trade: "[Folklorists were the] hunters and gatherers of academe…still rooting about in reality, hunting down and gathering up facts that we brought back alive. In those days [the 1960s] … we were delighted to be allowed to enter the university, set up camp, and practice our humble, archaic trade. They had let us in and we honored the established disciplines around us by stealing all we could. While the more advanced people around us slept, we slid in the shadows past their fires, rifled their baggage, stole their books, learned their language, and came to be able to ape their culture in a way that we at least found convincing. In our excitement we did not stop to ponder whether their theories sorted well with our traditional preoccupations. We learned the schemes of those we perceived to be higher in the academic hierarchy than ourselves, then applied those schemes to our own topics. We felt mature.)

The folklorist also rubs shoulders with researchers, tools and inquiries of neighboring fields: literature, anthropology, cultural history, linguistics, geography, musicology, sociology, psychology. This is just a partial list of the fields of study related to folklore studies, all of which are united by a common interest in subject matter.

== History ==
=== From antiquities to lore ===
It is well-documented that the term folklore was coined in 1846 by the Englishman William Thoms. He fabricated it for use in an article published in the August 22, 1846 issue of The Athenaeum. Thoms consciously replaced the contemporary terminology of popular antiquities or popular literature with this new word. Folklore was to emphasize the study of a specific subset of the population: the rural, mostly illiterate peasantry. In his published call for help in documenting antiquities, Thoms was echoing scholars from across the European continent to collect artifacts of older, mostly oral cultural traditions still flourishing among the rural populace. In Germany the Brothers Grimm had first published their "Kinder- und Hausmärchen" in 1812. They continued throughout their lives to collect German folk tales to include in their collection. In Scandinavia, intellectuals were also searching for their authentic Teutonic roots and had labeled their studies Folkeminde (Danish) or Folkermimne (Norwegian). Throughout Europe and America, other early collectors of folklore were at work. Thomas Crofton Croker published fairy tales from southern Ireland and, together with his wife, documented keening and other Irish funeral customs. Elias Lönnrot is best known for his collection of epic Finnish poems published under the title Kalevala. John Fanning Watson in the United States published the "Annals of Philadelphia".

With increasing industrialization, urbanization, and the rise in literacy throughout Europe in the 19th century, folklorists were concerned that the oral knowledge and beliefs, the lore of the rural folk would be lost. It was posited that the stories, beliefs and customs were surviving fragments of a cultural mythology of the region, pre-dating Christianity and rooted in pagan peoples and beliefs. This thinking goes in lockstep with the rise of nationalism across Europe. Some British folklorists, rather than lamenting or attempting to preserve rural or pre-industrial cultures, saw their work as a means of furthering industrialization, scientific rationalism, and disenchantment.

As the need to collect these vestiges of rural traditions became more compelling, the need to formalize this new field of cultural studies became apparent. The British Folklore Society was established in 1878 and the American Folklore Society was established a decade later. These were just two of a plethora of academic societies founded in the latter half of the 19th century by educated members of the emerging middle class. For literate, urban intellectuals and students of folklore the folk was someone else and the past was recognized as being something truly different. Folklore became a measure of the progress of society, how far we had moved forward into the industrial present and indeed removed ourselves from a past marked by poverty, illiteracy and superstition. The task of both the professional folklorist and the amateur at the turn of the 20th century was to collect and classify cultural artifacts from the pre-industrial rural areas, parallel to the drive in the life sciences to do the same for the natural world. (Note: Charles Darwin published On the Origin of Species in 1859.) "Folk was a clear label to set materials apart from modern life…material specimens, which were meant to be classified in the natural history of civilization. Tales, originally dynamic and fluid, were given stability and concreteness by means of the printed page."

Viewed as fragments from a pre-literate culture, these stories and objects were collected without context to be displayed and studied in museums and anthologies, just as bones and potsherds were gathered for the life sciences. Kaarle Krohn and Antti Aarne were active collectors of folk poetry in Finland. The Scotsman Andrew Lang is known for his 25 volumes of Andrew Lang's Fairy Books from around the world. Francis James Child was an American academic who collected English and Scottish popular ballads and their American variants, published as the Child Ballads. In the United States, Mark Twain was a charter member of the American Folklore Society. Both he and Washington Irving drew on folklore to write their stories. The 1825 novel Brother Jonathan by John Neal is recognized as the most extensive literary use of American folklore of its time.

=== Aarne–Thompson and the historic–geographic method ===
By the beginning of the 20th century these collections had grown to include artifacts from around the world and across several centuries. A system to organize and categorize them became necessary. Antti Aarne published a first classification system for folktales in 1910. It was later expanded into the Aarne–Thompson classification system by Stith Thompson and remains the standard classification system for European folktales and other types of oral literature. As the number of classified artifacts grew, similarities were noted in items which had been collected from very different geographic regions, ethnic groups and epochs.

In an effort to understand and explain the similarities found in tales from different locations, the Finnish folklorists Julius and Kaarle Krohne developed the Historical-Geographical method, also called the Finnish method. Using multiple variants of a tale, this investigative method attempted to work backwards in time and location to compile the original version from what they considered the incomplete fragments still in existence. This was the search for the "Urform", which by definition was more complete and more "authentic" than the newer, more scattered versions. The historic-geographic method has been succinctly described as a "quantitative mining of the resulting archive, and extraction of distribution patterns in time and space". It is based on the assumption that every text artifact is a variant of the original text. As a proponent of this method, Walter Anderson proposed additionally a Law of Self-Correction, i.e. a feedback mechanism which would keep the variants closer to the original form. (Note: Anderson is best known for his monograph Kaiser und Abt (Folklore Fellows' Communications 42, Helsinki 1923) on folktales of type AT 922.)

It was during the first decades of the 20th century that Folklore Studies in Europe and America began to diverge. The Europeans continued with their emphasis on oral traditions of the pre-literate peasant, and remained connected to literary scholarship within the universities. By this definition, folklore was completely based in the European cultural sphere; any social group that did not originate in Europe was to be studied by ethnologists and cultural anthropologists. In this light, some twenty-first century scholars have interpreted European folkloristics as an instrument of internal colonialism, in parallel with the imperialistic dimensions of early 20th century cultural anthropology and Orientalism. Unlike contemporary anthropology, however, many early European folklorists were themselves members of the prioritized groups that folkloristics was intended to study; for instance, Andrew Lang and James George Frazer were both themselves Scotsmen and studied rural folktales from towns near where they grew up.

In contrast to this, American folklorists, under the influence of the German-American Franz Boas and Ruth Benedict, sought to incorporate other cultural groups living in their region into the study of folklore. This included not only customs brought over by northern European immigrants, but also African Americans, Acadians of eastern Canada, Cajuns of Louisiana, Hispanics of the American southwest, and Native Americans. Not only were these distinct cultural groups all living in the same regions, but their proximity to each other caused their traditions and customs to intermingle. The lore of these distinct social groups, all of them Americans, was considered the bailiwick of American folklorists, and aligned American folklore studies more with ethnology than with literary studies.

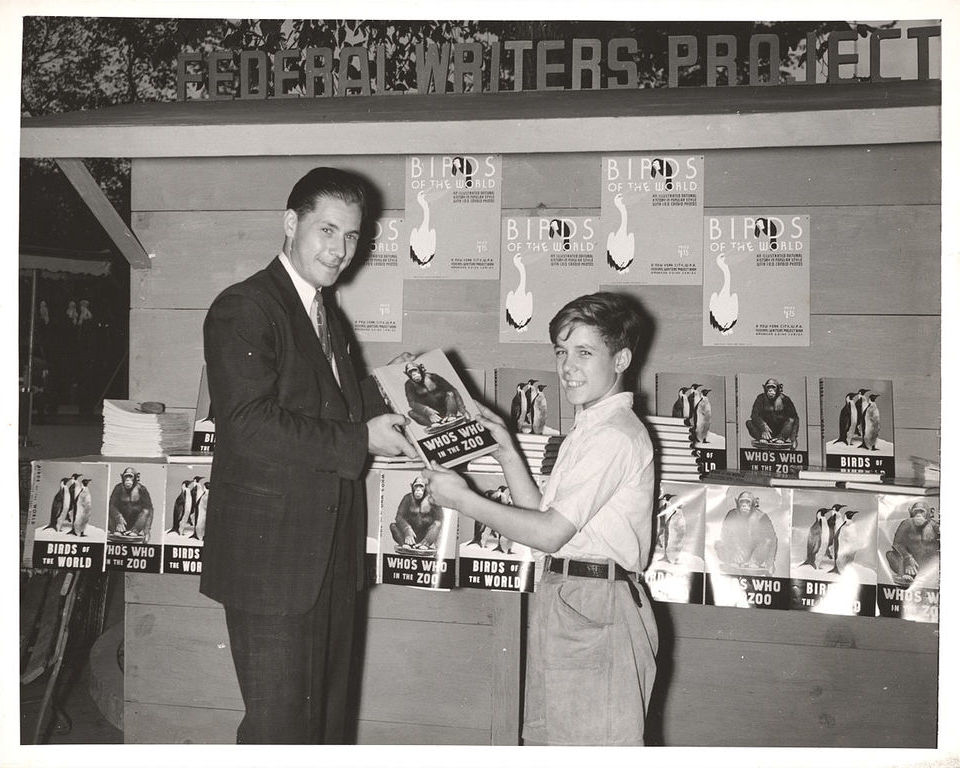
Federal Writers Project

=== Great Depression and the Federal Writers' Project ===
Then came the 1930s and the worldwide Great Depression. In the United States the Federal Writers' Project was established as part of the WPA. Its goal was to offer paid employment to thousands of unemployed writers by engaging them in various cultural projects around the country. These white collar workers were sent out as field workers to collect the oral folklore of their regions, including stories, songs, idioms and dialects. The most famous of these collections is the Slave Narrative Collection. The folklore collected under the auspices of the Federal Writers Project during these years continues to offer a goldmine of primary source materials for folklorists and other cultural historians.

As chairman of the Federal Writers' Project between 1938 and 1942, Benjamin A. Botkin supervised the work of these folklore field workers. Both Botkin and John Lomax were particularly influential during this time in expanding folklore collection techniques to include more detailing of the interview context. This was a significant move away from viewing the collected artifacts as isolated fragments, broken remnants of an incomplete pre-historic whole. Using these new interviewing techniques, the collected lore became embedded in and imbued with meaning within the framework of its contemporary practice. The emphasis moved from the lore to the folk, i.e. the groups and the people who gave this lore meaning within contemporary daily living.

=== German folklore in the Third Reich ===
In Europe during these same decades, folklore studies were drifting in a different direction. Throughout the 19th century folklore had been tied to romantic ideals of the soul of the people, in which folk tales and folksongs recounted the lives and exploits of ethnic folk heroes. Folklore chronicled the mythical origins of different peoples across Europe and established the beginnings of national pride. By the first decade of the 20th century there were scholarly societies as well as individual folklore positions within universities, academies, and museums. However, the study of German Volkskunde had yet to be defined as an academic discipline.

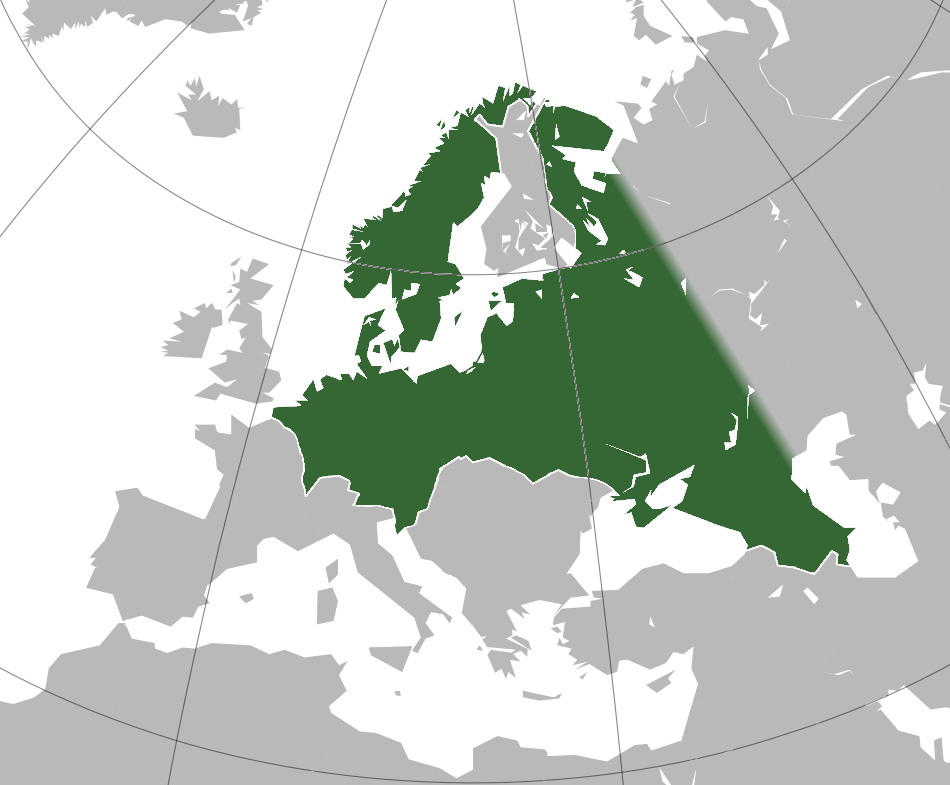
Greater Germanic Reich

In the 1920s this originally apolitical movement was coopted by nationalism in several European countries, including Germany, where it was absorbed into emerging Nazi ideology. The vocabulary of German Volkskunde such as Volk (folk), Rasse (race), Stamm (tribe), and Erbe (heritage) were frequently referenced by the Nazi Party. Their expressed goal was to re-establish what they perceived as the former purity of the Germanic peoples of Europe. The German anti-Nazi philosopher Ernst Bloch was one of the main analysts and critics of this ideology. (Note: In his study Erbschaft dieser Zeit (1935) (translation Heritage of Our Times, Polity, 1991) Ernst Bloch examined how the mythological way of scholarly thought of the 19th century was revived by the National Socialists.) "Nazi ideology presented racial purity as the means to heal the wounds of the suffering German state following World War I. Hitler painted the ethnic heterogeneity of Germany as a major reason for the country's economic and political weakness, and he promised to restore a German realm based on a cleansed, and hence strong, German people. Racial or ethnic purity" was the goal of the Nazis, intent on forging a Greater Germanic Reich.

In the postwar years, departments of folklore were established in multiple German universities. However an analysis of just how folklore studies supported the policies of the Third Reich did not begin until 20 years after World War II in West Germany. Particularly in the works of Hermann Bausinger and Wolfgang Emmerich in the 1960s, it was pointed out that the vocabulary current in Volkskunde was ideally suited for the kind of ideology that the National Socialists had built up. It was then another 20 years before convening the 1986 Munich conference on folklore and National Socialism. This continues to be a difficult and painful discussion within the German folklore community.

=== After World War II ===
Following World War II, the discussion continued about whether to align folklore studies with literature or ethnology. Within this discussion, many voices were actively trying to identify the optimal approach to take in the analysis of folklore artifacts. One major change had already been initiated by Franz Boas. Culture was no longer viewed in evolutionary terms; each culture has its own integrity and completeness, and was not progressing either toward wholeness or toward fragmentation. Individual artifacts must have meaning within the culture and for individuals themselves in order to assume cultural relevance and assure continued transmission. Because the European folklore movement had been primarily oriented toward oral traditions, a new term, folklife, was introduced to represent the full range of traditional culture. This included music, dance, storytelling, crafts, costume, foodways and more.

In this period, folklore came to refer to the event of doing something within a given context, for a specific audience, using artifacts as necessary props in the communication of traditions between individuals and within groups. Beginning in the 1970s, these new areas of folklore studies became articulated in performance studies, where traditional behaviors are evaluated and understood within the context of their performance. It is the meaning within the social group that becomes the focus for these folklorists, foremost among them Richard Baumann and Barbara Kirshenblatt-Gimblett. Enclosing any performance is a framework which signals that the following is something outside of ordinary communication. For example, "So, have you heard the one…" automatically flags the following as a joke. A performance can take place either within a cultural group, re-iterating and re-enforcing the customs and beliefs of the group. Or it can be a performance for an outside group, in which the first goal is to set the performers apart from the audience.

This analysis then goes beyond the artifact itself, be it dance, music or story-telling. It goes beyond the performers and their message. As part of performance studies, the audience becomes part of the performance. If any folklore performance strays too far from audience expectations, it will likely be brought back by means of a negative feedback loop at the next iteration. Both performer and audience are acting within the "Twin Laws" of folklore transmission, in which novelty and innovation is balanced by the conservative forces of the familiar. Even further, the presence of a folklore observer at a performance of any kind will influence the performance itself in subtle and not-so-subtle ways. Because folklore is firstly an act of communication between parties, it is incomplete without inclusion of the reception in its analysis. The understanding of folklore performance as communication leads directly into modern linguistic theory and communication studies. Words both reflect and shape our worldview. Oral traditions, particularly in their stability over generations and even centuries, provide significant insight into the ways in which insiders of a culture see, understand, and express their responses to the world around them. (Note: In his chapter "Folklore and Cultural Worldview", Toelken provides an illuminating comparison of the worldview of European Americans with Navajos. In the use of language, the two cultural groups express widely differing understandings of their spatial and temporal place in the universe.)

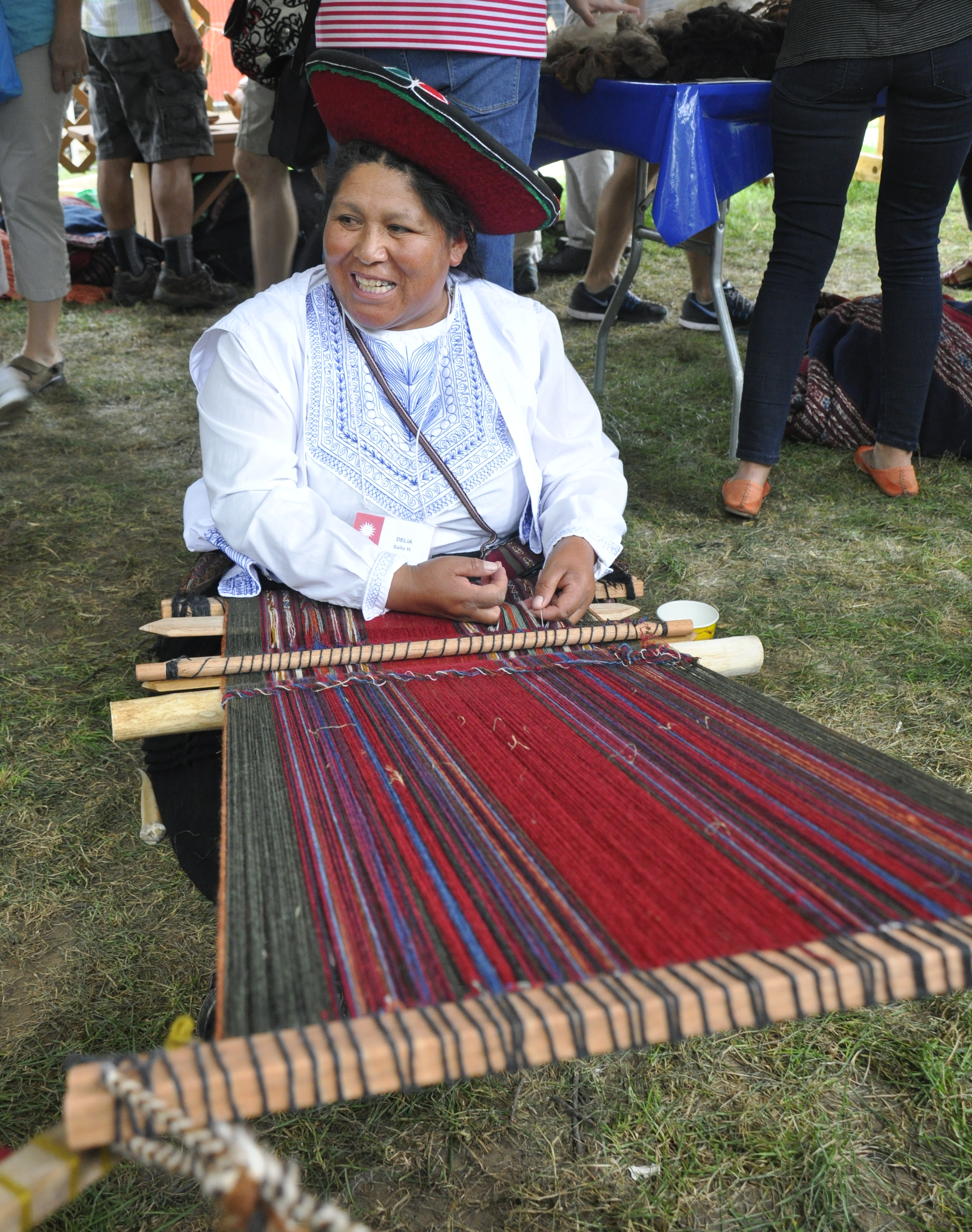
2015 Smithsonian Folklife Festival

Three major approaches to folklore interpretation were developed during the second half of the 20th century. Structuralism in folklore studies attempts to define the structures underlying oral and customary folklore. (Note: For example, a joke uses words within a specific and well-defined narrative structure to make people laugh. A fable uses anthropomorphized animals and natural features to illustrate a moral lesson, frequently concluding with a moral. These are just a few of the many formulaic structures used in oral traditions.) Once classified, it was easy for structural folklorists to lose sight of the overarching issue: what are the characteristics which keep a form constant and relevant over multiple generations? Functionalism in folklore studies also came to the fore following World War II; as spokesman, William Bascom formulated the 4 functions of folklore. This approach takes a more top-down approach to understand how a specific form fits into and expresses meaning within the culture as a whole. (Note: An example of this are the joke cycles that spontaneously appear in response to a national or world tragedy or disaster.) A third method of folklore analysis, popular in the late 20th century, is the Psychoanalytic Interpretation, championed by Alan Dundes. His monographs, including a study of homoerotic subtext in American football and anal-erotic elements in German folklore, were not always appreciated and involved Dundes in several major folklore studies controversies during his career. True to each of these approaches, and any others one might want to employ (political, women's issues, material culture, urban contexts, non-verbal text, ad infinitum), whichever perspective is chosen will spotlight some features and leave other characteristics in the shadows.

With the passage in 1976 of the American Folklife Preservation Act, folklore studies in the United States came of age. This legislation follows in the footsteps of other legislation designed to safeguard more tangible aspects of our national heritage worthy of protection. This law also marks a shift in our national awareness; it gives voice to the national understanding that diversity within the country is a unifying feature, not something that separates us. "We no longer view cultural difference as a problem to be solved, but as a tremendous opportunity. In the diversity of American folklife we find a marketplace teeming with the exchange of traditional forms and cultural ideas, a rich resource for Americans". This diversity is celebrated annually at the Smithsonian Folklife Festival and many other folklife festivals around the country.

== Global folklore studies ==
=== Folklore studies and nationalism in Turkey ===
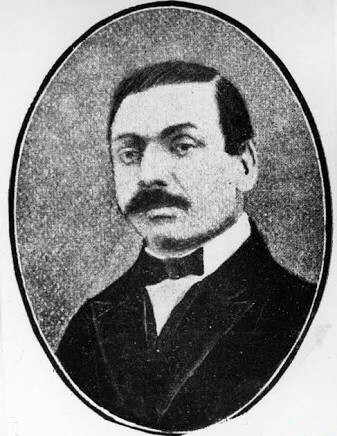
Sinasi

Folklore interest sparked in Turkey around the second half of the nineteenth century when the need to determine a national language came about. Their writings consisted of vocabulary and grammatical rule from the Arabic and Persian language. Although the Ottoman intellectuals were not affected by the communication gap, in 1839, the Tanzimat reform introduced a change to Ottoman literature. A new generation of writers with contact to the West, especially France, noticed the importance of literature and its role in the development of institutions. Following the models set by Westerners, the new generation of writers returned to Turkey bringing the ideologies of novels, short stories, plays and journalism with them. These new forms of literature were set to enlighten the people of Turkey, influencing political and social change within the country. However, the lack of understanding for the language of their writings limited their success in enacting change.

Using the language of the "common people" to create literature, influenced the Tanzimat writers to gain interest in folklore and folk literature. In 1859, writer Sinasi, wrote a play in simple enough language that it could be understood by the masses. He later produced a collection of four thousand proverbs. Many other poets and writers throughout the Turkish nation began to join in on the movement including Ahmet Midhat Efendi who composed short stories based on the proverbs written by Sinasi. These short stories, like many folk stories today, were intended to teach moral lessons to its readers.

=== Folklore studies in Chile ===
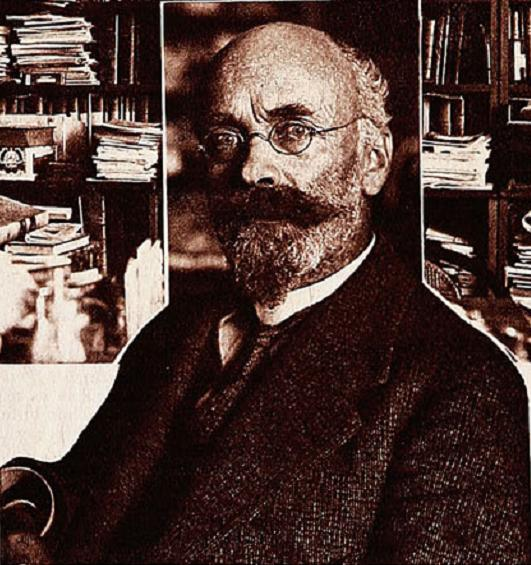
Chilean folklorist Rodolfo Lenz in 1915

The study of folklore in Chile was developed in a systematic and pioneering way since the late 19th century. In the work of compiling the popular traditions of the Chilean people and of the original peoples, they stood out, not only in the study of national folklore, but also in Latin America. Ramón Laval, Julio Vicuña, Rodolfo Lenz, José Toribio Medina, Tomás Guevara, Félix de Augusta, and Aukanaw, among others, generated an important documentary and critical corpus around oral literature, autochthonous languages, regional dialects, and peasant and indigenous customs. They published, mainly during the first decades of the 20th century, linguistic and philological studies, dictionaries, comparative studies between the national folklores of Ibero-America, compilations of stories, poetry, and religious traditions. In 1909, at the initiative of Laval, Vicuña and Lenz, the Chilean Folklore Society was founded, the first of its kind in America. Two years later, it would merge with the recently created Chilean Society of History and Geography.

== 21st century ==
With the development of the digital age, the purpose of folklore is dramatically changing. Although the profession in folklore and the number of articles and books on folklore topics continues to grow, the traditional role of the folklorist continues to change.

=== Globalization ===
The United States is known as a land of immigrants; with the exception of the first American indigenous nations. For folklorists, the United States represents a cultural mixing ground. It is in the study of their folklife that we begin to understand the cultural patterns underlying different ethnic and linguistic groups. Language and customs can provide insights into an individual's perception. "The study of varying worldviews among ethnic and national groups in America remains one of the most important unfinished tasks for folklorists and anthropologists." (Note: See also Dundes (2005), p. 387. [Folklore studies is] "a discipline which has been ahead of its time in recognizing the importance of folklore in promoting ethnic pride and in providing invaluable data for the discovery of native cognitive categories and patterns of worldview and values.")

Contrary to a widespread concern, we are not seeing a loss of diversity and increasing cultural homogenization across the land. (Note: The newness of this discussion can be seen in the references for Cultural homogenization; all sources listed have been published in 21st century.) In fact, critics of this theory point out that as different cultures mix, the cultural landscape becomes multifaceted with the intermingling of customs. People become aware of other cultures and pick and choose different items to adopt from each other. One noteworthy example of this is the Jewish Christmas Tree, a point of some contention among American Jews.

Public sector folklore was introduced into the American Folklore Society in the early 1970s. These public folklorists work in museums and cultural agencies to identify and document the diverse folk cultures and folk artists in their region. Beyond this, they provide performance venues for the artists, with the twin objectives of entertainment and education about different ethnic groups. Given the number of folk festivals held around the world, it becomes clear that the cultural multiplicity of a region is presented with pride and excitement. Public folklorists are increasingly being involved in economic and community development projects to elucidate and clarify differing world views of the social groups impacted by the projects.

=== Computerized databases and big data ===
Once folklore artifacts have been recorded on the World Wide Web, they can be collected in large electronic databases and moved into collections of big data. This compels folklorists to find new ways to collect and curate these data. Along with these new challenges, electronic data collections provide the opportunity to ask different questions, and combine with other academic fields to explore new aspects of traditional culture. Computational humor is one new field that has taken up the traditional oral forms of jokes and anecdotes for study, holding its first dedicated conference in 1996. This moves beyond gathering and categorizing large joke collections. Scholars are using computers to recognize jokes in context, and to attempt to create jokes using artificial intelligence.

=== Binary thinking of the computer age ===
As we move forward in the digital age, the binary thinking of the 20th century structuralists remains an important tool in the folklorist's toolbox. This does not mean that binary thinking was invented in recent times along with computers; only that we became aware of both the power and the limitations of the "either/or" construction. In folklore studies, the multiple binaries underlying much of the theoretical thinking have been identified – {dynamicism: conservatism}, {anecdote: myth}, {process: structure}, {performance: tradition}, {improvisation: repetition}, {variation : traditionalism}, {repetition : innovation}; not to overlook the original binary of the first folklorists: {traditional : modern} or {old : new}. Bauman re-iterates this thought pattern in claiming that at the core of all folklore is the dynamic tension between tradition and variation (or creativity). Noyes uses similar vocabulary to define [folk] group as "the ongoing play and tension between, on the one hand, the fluid networks of relationship we constantly both produce and negotiate in everyday life and, on the other, the imagined communities we also create and enact but that serve as forces of stabilizing allegiance."

This thinking only becomes problematic in light of the theoretical work done on binary opposition, which exposes the values intrinsic to any binary pair. Typically, one of the two opposites assumes a role of dominance over the other. The categorization of binary oppositions is "often value-laden and ethnocentric", imbuing them with illusory order and superficial meaning.

=== Linear and non-linear concepts of time ===
Another baseline of western thought has also been thrown into disarray in the recent past. In western culture, we live in a time of progress, moving forward from one moment to the next. The goal is to become better and better, culminating in perfection. In this model time is linear, with direct causality in the progression. "You reap what you sow", "A stitch in time saves nine", "Alpha and omega", the Christian concept of an afterlife all exemplify a cultural understanding of time as linear and progressive. In folklore studies, going backwards in time was also a valid avenue of exploration. The goal of the early folklorists of the historic-geographic school was to reconstruct from fragments of folk tales the Urtext of the original mythic (pre-Christian) world view. When and where was an artifact documented? Those were the important questions posed by early folklorists in their collections. Armed with these data points, a grid pattern of time-space coordinates for artifacts could be plotted.

Awareness has grown that different cultures have different concepts of time (and space). In his study "The American Indian Mind in a Linear World", Donald Fixico describes an alternate concept of time. "Indian thinking" involves "'seeing' things from a perspective emphasizing that circles and cycles are central to world and that all things are related within the Universe." He then suggests that "the concept of time for Indian people has been such a continuum that time becomes less relevant and the rotation of life or seasons of the year are stressed as important." (Note: This blanket interpretation has been questioned by some as too simplistic in its sweeping application to all Native American tribes. See Rouse (2012), p. 14ff.) In a more specific example, the folklorist Barre Toelken describes the Navajo as living in circular times, which is echoed and re-enforced in their sense of space, the traditional circular or multi-sided hogan. Lacking the European mechanistic devices of marking time (clocks, watches, calendars), they depended on the cycles of nature: sunrise to sunset, winter to summer. Their stories and histories are not marked by decades and centuries, but remain close in, as they circle around the constant rhythms of the natural world.

Within the last decades our time scale has expanded from unimaginably small (nanoseconds) to unimaginably large (deep time). In comparison, our working concept of time as {past : present : future} looks almost quaint. How do we map "tradition" into this multiplicity of time scales? Folklore studies has already acknowledged this in the study of traditions which are either done in an annual cycle of circular time (ex. Christmas, May Day), or in a life cycle of linear time (ex. baptisms, weddings, funerals). This needs to be expanded to other traditions of oral lore. For folk narrative is NOT a linear chain of isolated tellings, going from one single performance on our time-space grid to the next single performance. Instead it fits better into a non-linear system, where one performer varies the story from one telling to the next, and the performer's understudy starts to tell the story, also varying each performance in response to multiple factors.

=== Cybernetics ===
Cybernetics was first developed in the 20th century; it investigates the functions and processes of systems. The goal in cybernetics is to identify and understand a system's closed signaling loop, in which an action by the system generates a change in the environment, which in turn triggers feedback to the system and initiates a new action. The field has expanded from a focus on mechanistic and biological systems to an expanded recognition that these theoretical constructs can also be applied to many cultural and societal systems, including folklore. Once divorced from a model of tradition that works solely on a linear time scale (i.e. moving from one folklore performance to the next), we begin to ask different questions about how these folklore artifacts maintain themselves over generations and centuries.

The oral tradition of jokes as an example is found across all cultures, and is documented as early as 1600 B.C. (Note: The earliest recorded joke is on an Egyptian papyrus dated at 1600 B.C. See Joke#History in print.) Whereas the subject matter varies widely to reflect its cultural context, the form of the joke remains remarkably consistent. According to the theories of cybernetics and its secondary field of autopoiesis, this can be attributed to a closed loop auto-correction built into the system maintenance of oral folklore. Auto-correction in oral folklore was first articulated by the folklorist Walter Anderson in his monograph on the King and the Abbot published 1923. To explain the stability of the narrative, Anderson posited a “double redundancy”, in which the performer has heard the story from multiple other performers, and has himself performed it multiple times. This provides a feedback loop between repetitions at both levels to retain the essential elements of the tale, while at the same time allowing for the incorporation of new elements.

Another characteristic of cybernetics and autopoiesis is self-generation within a system. Once again looking to jokes, we find new jokes generated in response to events on a continuing basis. The folklorist Bill Ellis accessed internet humor message boards to observe in real time the creation of topical jokes following the 9/11 terrorist attack in the United States. "Previous folklore research has been limited to collecting and documenting successful jokes, and only after they had emerged and come to folklorists' attention. Now, an Internet-enhanced collection creates a time machine, as it were, where we can observe what happens in the period before the risible moment, when attempts at humour are unsuccessful.", that is before they have successfully mapped into the traditional joke format.

Second-order cybernetics states that the system observer affects the systemic interplay; this interplay has long been recognized as problematic by folklorists. The act of observing and noting any folklore performance raises without exception the performance from an unconscious habitual acting within a group, to and for themselves, to a performance for an outsider. "Naturally the researcher's presence changes things, in the way that any new entrant to a social setting changes things. When people of different backgrounds, agendas, and resources interact, there are social risks, and where representation and publication are taking place, these risks are exacerbated..." (Note: For a further discussion of this, see also Schmidt-Lauber (2012), p. 362ff.)

== Scholarly organizations and journals ==
- American Folklore Society
- International Society for Ethnology and Folklore
- Journal of American Folklore
- Journal of Folklore Research
- The Society for Folk Life Studies
- The Folklore Society
- Western Folklore
- Cultural Analysis

== Notable folklorists ==
For a list of notable folklorists, go to the category list.

== Associated theories and methods ==
- Cultural Heritage
- Environmental Determinism
- Ethnology
- Ethnopoetics, a method of recording text versions of oral poetry or narrative performances (i.e., verbal lore)
- Fine Art
- Functionalism (philosophy of mind)
- Mimesis
- Motif-Index of Folk-Literature
- Museum folklore
- Performance Studies
- Romantic Nationalism
- Social Evolution
- Structuralism

== See also ==
- Memetics
- Ethnomusicology
- Ethnography
