= German studies =

Field of humanities related to German language, German literature, and German culture

German studies is an academic field that researches, documents and disseminates German language, literature, and culture in its historical and present forms. Academic departments of German studies therefore often focus on German culture, German history, and German politics in addition to the language and literature component. Approaches to the discipline vary by country. Modern German studies is usually seen as a combination of two sub-disciplines: German linguistics alongside Teutonophone literature and cultural studies.

Common names for "German Studies" for the field within German-speaking countries are Germanistik, Deutsche Philologie, and Deutsche Sprachwissenschaft und Literaturwissenschaft. In English, the terms Germanistics or Germanics are sometimes used (mostly by German-speakers), but the subject is more often referred to as simply German studies, German language and literature, or German philology. Academics who specialize in German studies are referred to as Germanists.

== German linguistics ==
German linguistics is traditionally called philology in Germany, though most German studies departments house linguists whose focus relates to German or Germanic language(s) in both their historic and present forms. The periods of German's philological development are roughly divided as follows:

- Old High German (Althochdeutsch) 8th–11th centuries
- Middle High German (Mittelhochdeutsch) 11th–14th centuries
- Early New High German (Frühneuhochdeutsch) 14th–17th centuries
- Modern German (Standard German, German dialectology) 18th–21st centuries

In addition, the discipline examines German under various aspects: the way it is spoken and written, i.e., spelling; declination; vocabulary; sentence structure; texts; etc. It compares the various manifestations such as social groupings (slang, written texts, etc.) and geographical groupings (dialects, etc.).

== German literature studies ==
The study of German literature is divided into two parts: Ältere Deutsche Literaturwissenschaft deals with the period from the beginnings of German in the early Middle Ages up to post-Medieval times around AD 1750, while the modern era is covered by Neuere Deutsche Literaturwissenschaft. The field systematically examines German literature in terms of genre, form, content, and motifs as well as looking at it historically by author and epoch. Important areas include edition philology, history of literature, and textual interpretation. The relationships of German literature to the literatures of other languages (e.g. reception and mutual influences) and historical contexts are also important areas of concentration.

German literature studies benefits from the particularly rich printing tradition of the German-speaking world. Given Johannes Gutenberg and thus the modern printing press originates from German-speaking Europe, Germanic texts have historically enjoyed a heightened status among scholars. Other prominent historical figures, such as Martin Luther have also marked the history of literature through his dissemination of the Bible and thereby an early and strong German-speaking reading culture compared to other European publics.

Much like other literature-centered fields, German literature studies is concerned with ecocriticism, hermeneutics, feminism, narratology, psychoanalytic criticism, postcolonialism, postmodernism, post-structuralism, reader-response, semiotics, sound studies, spatial theory, speech acts, structuralism, symbology, and queer theory.

== German cultural studies ==
The study of German culture encompasses issues related to German politics, German history, Holocaust studies, national identity, German art, art history, migration, film studies, museum studies, memory studies, German Literature, and media. The sub-field is highly interdisciplinary drawing from both the humanities and social sciences to examine issues related to contemporary German-speaking countries. Such approaches are often focalized through the lens of the German-speaking nation at present. Thus, the study of countries such as Austria and Switzerland, as well as other German-speaking groups, are often focalized not only through their shared German linguistic and cultural heritage, but for their distinct national and diasporic contexts. German cultural studies therefore incorporates the historical areas of German influence across Europe and overseas as it relates to both migration and colonization.

German cultural studies is most common in departments located outside of a German-speaking country, acting in many forms as a form of area studies related to the German Sprachraum. A heightened focus on German cultural studies became apparent following the fall of the Berlin Wall in 1989 and has increasingly been tied to the field of European Studies.

== DAAD Centers for German and European Studies ==
In the years following the fall of the wall, the German federal government established Centers for German and European Studies throughout North America. This effort sought to increase transatlantic political, cultural, and academic cooperation between the United States and post-Soviet Europe, with a strong focus on Germany's increased importance within the European Union as a reunified state. Sponsored by the German Academic Exchange Services (DAAD), these Centers for German and European studies mark a distinct departure from traditional German studies programs and are often housed within broader internationally oriented departments dealing with international affairs, area studies, or public policy within North America. The DAAD Centers for German and European Studies in North America are listed as follows:

- BMW Center for German and European Studies at Georgetown University
- Center for German and European Studies at Brandeis University
- Centers for German and European Studies at the University of Wisconsin and University of Minnesota
- Center for German and European Studies at the University of California, Berkeley
- Joint Initiative in German and European Studies at the University of Toronto
- Center for German and European Studies at the University of British Columbia
- Le Centre Canadien d'Études Allemandes et Européennes at the Université de Montréal
- The Program for the Study of Germany and Europe at Harvard University

DAAD Centers for German and European Studies beyond North America include the following:

- Institute of German and European Studies, Tongji University, Yangpu District, Shanghai
- Haifa Center for German and European Studies – University of Haifa
- European Forum at the Hebrew University - at The Hebrew University of Jerusalem
- Center of German and European Studies - Pontifical University of Rio Grande do Sul and the Federal University of Rio Grande do Sul
- Center for German and European Studies at the University of Tokyo
- Center for German and European Studies at Chung-Ang University in South Korea

== German teacher education ==
At least in Germany and Austria, German studies in academia play a central role in the education of German school teachers. Their courses usually cover four fields:

- Linguistics of German (Sprachwissenschaft)
- German language and literature of up to about 1750 (Ältere Sprache und Literatur)
- German language and literature since approximately 1750 (Neuere Literaturwissenschaft)
- Specifics of the didactics of teaching German (Fachdidaktik)

Several universities offer specialized curricula for school teachers, usually called "Deutsch (Lehramt)". In Germany, they are leading to a two step exam and certificate by the federated states of Germany cultural authorities, called the Staatsexamen ("state exam").

== History ==
As an unsystematic field of interest for individual scholars, German studies can be traced back to Tacitus' Germania. The publication and study of legal and historical source material, such as Medieval Bible translations, were all undertaken during the German Renaissance of the sixteenth century, truly initiating the field of German studies. As an independent university subject, German studies was introduced at the beginning of the nineteenth century by Georg Friedrich Benecke, the Brothers Grimm, and Karl Lachmann.

The Nazi period, and immediate predecessor periods before and after World War I, left large parts of the field, which had drifted off more and more into race-biological thinking, greatly compromised and damaged, as major proponents on both the literature (e.g. Prof. Josef Nadler in Vienna) and the linguistics side (e.g. Prof. Eberhard Kranzmayer in Graz) were actively working for the Nazi Party (Kranzmayer, Höfler) and their racist goals (Nadler) While great efforts have been made in the denazification of the field, some biases are suggested by overseas Germanist to have remained. After all, post-war academia, with "Nazi party membership among university professors greatly exceed[ing] that of the population at large," was not a complete restart, least of all, in German philology, where 90% of university teachers were NSDAP members.

== University departments and research institutions ==
Austria

- Institute for German Studies (Institut für Germanistik), University of Vienna
- Institute for German Studies (Institut für Germanistik), University of Graz, the first Germanistik in Austria founded at the request of Anton Emanuel Schönbach in 1873

Bénin

- Département d'Etudes Germanique (DEG), Université d'Abomey-Calavi

Botswana

- Department of Education and Language Skills, Botho University

Brazil

- Department of German Language and Literature Studies University of São Paulo, Brazil

Canada

- Department of German Language and Literature, Queen's University, Kingston, Ontario
- Department of Germanic Languages and Literatures, University of Toronto

China

- Department of German, Beijing Foreign Studies University, Haidian District, Beijing

Czech Republic

- Department of German and Austrian Studies, Charles University in Prague
- Department of German Studies, Palacký University in Olomouc

India

- Jawaharlal Nehru University India

Ireland

- Department of Germanic Studies, Trinity College, The University of Dublin, Ireland
- Department of German, National University of Ireland – University College Cork, Cork, Ireland

Germany

"German studies" is taught at many German universities. Some examples are:

- Germanistisches Seminar der Universität Bonn, Institut für Germanistik, vergleichende Literatur- und Kulturwissenschaft, Rheinische Friedrich-Wilhelms-Universität Bonn
- Institut für deutsche Sprache und Literatur I & II, Albertus-Magnus-Universität zu Köln
- Institut für Germanistik I & II, Hamburg University
- Germanistisches Seminar, Heidelberg University Faculty of Modern Languages
- Institut für deutsche Philologie, LMU Munich
- Germanistisches Institut, Westfälische Wilhelms-Universität Münster
- Deutsches Seminar, Tübingen University Faculty of Modern Languages

Greece

- Faculty of German Language and Literature, National and Kapodistrian University of Athens
- School of German Language and Literature, Aristotle University of Thessaloniki

Russia

- Department of Area Studies, Moscow State University

South Africa

- School of Languages and Literatures, University of Cape Town
- Department of Afrikaans and Dutch, German and French, University of the Free State
- School of Languages, North-West University
- Ancient Modern Languages Cultures, University of Pretoria
- School of Languages and Literatures, Rhodes University
- Department of Modern Foreign Languages, University of Stellenbosch
- Department of Foreign Languages, University of the Western Cape
- Department of Literature, Language and Media, University of the Witwatersrand

Spain

- Área de Filología Alemana, University of Salamanca

Uganda

- Department of European and Oriental Languages, German Studies, Makerere University

United Kingdom (UK)

- Department of German, University of Oxford
- Department of German, University of Cambridge
- Department of German, University of Manchester
- Department of German Studies, University of Warwick

United States of America (USA)

- Department of German Studies, University of Arizona, Tucson
- German Program of the Department of World Languages & Literatures, University of Arkansas, Fayetteville
- Department of German Studies, Brown University
- Department of German, University of California, Berkeley
- Department of Germanic Languages, University of California, Los Angeles
- Department of German Studies, University of Cincinnati
- Department of Germanic and Slavic Languages and Literatures, University of Colorado, Boulder, CO
- Department of Germanic Languages, Columbia University
- Department of German Studies, Cornell University
- Department of German Studies, Dartmouth College
- Department of German, Duke University
- Department of German, Georgetown University
- Department of Germanic Languages and Literatures, Harvard University
- Department of Germanic Studies, University of Illinois at Chicago, Chicago, IL
- Department of Germanic Languages and Literatures, University of Illinois at Urbana-Champaign
- Department of Germanic Studies, Indiana University
- German and Scandinavian Studies, University of Massachusetts Amherst
- Department of Germanic Languages and Literatures, University of Michigan, Ann Arbor, MI
- Department of German, Scandinavian, and Dutch, University of Minnesota
- Department of German, New York University
- Department of Germanic and Slavic Languages and Literatures, University of North Carolina at Chapel Hill
- Department of German, Northwestern University
- Department of Germanic Languages and Literatures, Ohio State University, Columbus, Ohio
- Department of Germanic Languages and Literatures, University of Pennsylvania
- Department of Germanic and Slavic Languages, Pennsylvania State University, Pennsylvania
- Department of Germanic Languages and Literature, University of Pittsburgh, Pennsylvania
- Department of German, Princeton University
- Department of Germanic Studies, University of Texas at Austin
- Department of Classical & Modern Languages, Truman State University, Kirksville, Missouri
- Department of Germanic and Slavic Languages, Vanderbilt University, Nashville, Tennessee
- Department of Germanic and Russian, University of Vermont, Burlington, Vermont
- Department of Germanic Languages and Literatures, University of Virginia
- Department of Germanics, University of Washington, Seattle, Washington
- Department of Germanic Languages and Literatures, Washington University in St. Louis, St. Louis, Missouri
- Department of German, Nordic, and Slavic, University of Wisconsin – Madison
- Department of German, Yale University
- Department of Linguistics & Germanic, Slavic, Asian and African Languages, Michigan State University

Zimbabwe

- Department of Languages, Literature and Culture University of Zimbabwe

== See also ==
- Area studies
- German National Honor Society (Delta Epsilon Phi) in the US
- German Studies Association
- Germanic philology
- Germanisches Nationalmuseum
- New Objectivity
- Sturm und Drang

== Bibliography ==
=== Books ===
- Atlas Deutsche Sprache [CD-ROM]. Berlin: Directmedia Publishing. 2004.
- Die Deutschen Klassiker (CD-ROM).
- Berman, Antoine: L'épreuve de l'étranger. Culture et traduction dans l'Allemagne romantique: Herder, Goethe, Schlegel, Novalis, Humboldt, Schleiermacher, Hölderlin. Paris: Gallimard, 1984. ISBN 978-2-07-070076-9.
- Beutin, Wolfgang. Deutsche Literaturgeschichte. Von den Anfängen bis zur Gegenwart. Stuttgart: J. B. Metzler, 1992.
- Bogdal, Klaus-Michael, Kai Kauffmann, & Georg Mein. BA-Studium Germanistik. Ein Lehrbuch. In collaboration with Meinolf Schumacher and Johannes Volmert. Reinbek bei Hamburg: Rowohlt, 2008. ISBN 978-3-499-55682-1
- Burger, Harald. Sprache der Massenmedien. Berlin: Walter de Gruyter, 1984.
- Ernst, Peter. Germanistische Sprachwissenschaft. Vienna: WUV, 2004.
- Fohrmann, Jürgen & Wilhelm Voßkamp, eds. Wissenschaftsgeschichte der Germanistik im 19. Jahrhundert. Stuttgart: J. B. Metzler, 1994.
- Hartweg, Frédéric G. Frühneuhochdeutsch. Eine Einführung in die deutsche Sprache des Spätmittelalters und der frühen Neuzeit. Tübingen: Niemeyer, 2005.
- Hermand, Jost. Geschichte der Germanistik. Reinbek bei Hamburg: Rowohlt, 1994. ISBN 978-3-499-55534-3
- Hickethier, Knut. Film- und Fernsehanalyse. Stuttgart: J. B. Metzler, 1993.
- Hickethier, Knut, ed. Aspekte der Fernsehanalyse. Methoden und Modelle. Hamburg: Lit, 1994.
- Hohendahl, Peter Uwe. German Studies in the United States: A Historical Handbook. New York: Modern Language Association of America, 2003.
- Kanzog, Klaus. Einführung in die Filmphilologie. Munich: Schaudig, Bauer, Ledig, 1991.
- Muckenhaupt, Manfred: Text und Bild. Grundfragen der Beschreibung von Text-Bild-Kommunikation aus sprachwissenschaftlicher Sicht. Tübingen: Gunter Narr, 1986.
- Prokop, Dieter: Medienprodukte. Zugänge – Verfahren – Kritik. Tübingen: Gunter Narr, 1981.
- Schneider, Jost, ed. Methodengeschichte der Germanistik. Berlin: De Gruyter, 2009.
- Schumacher, Meinolf. Einführung in die deutsche Literatur des Mittelalters. Darmstadt: Wissenschaftliche Buchgesellschaft, 2010. ISBN 978-3-534-19603-6 (PDF)
- Shitanda, So. "Zur Vorgeschichte und Entstehung der deutschen Philologie im 19. Jh.: Karl Lachmann und die Brüder Grimm", in Literarische Problematisierung der Moderne. Medienprodukte : Zugänge-- Verfahren-- Kritik, ed. by Teruaki Takahashi. Munich: Iudicium, 1992.
- Van Cleve, John W. and A. Leslie Willson. Remarks on the Needed Reform of German Studies in the United States. Columbia, SC: Camden House, 1993.

=== Journals ===
- Acta Germanica
- Arbitrium
- German Life and Letters
- German Politics and Society
- German Studies Review
- The Germanic Review
- Germanistik
- Germanistik in Ireland
- The German Quarterly
- Goethe Yearbook
- Journal of Austrian Studies
- The Journal of English and Germanic Philology
- Journal of Germanic Linguistics
- Lessing Yearbook
- Modern Language Notes (German Issue)
- Monatshefte
- Michigan Germanic Studies
- New German Critique
- Oxford German Studies
- Publications of the English Goethe Society
- Seminar
- Teaching German (Unterrichtspraxis)
- Text+Kritik
- Transit
- Zeitschrift für interkulturelle Germanistik
- Zeitschrift für Germanistik
