= George L. Mosse Prize =

History book prize

The George L. Mosse Prize is a history book prize awarded annually by the American Historical Association for "an outstanding major work of extraordinary scholarly distinction, creativity, and originality in the intellectual and cultural history of Europe since 1500".

== Description ==
The prize, named after the eminent historian George Mosse, was established in 2000 with funds donated by former students, colleagues, and friends of the late Professor Mosse. Nominated books must be of high scholarly distinction, showing exceptional research accuracy, originality, and literary merit.

== Notable winners ==
Past winners of the prize include:

- 2026 - Keith Michael Baker, Jean-Paul Marat: Prophet of Terror
- 2025 - Catherine Tatiana Dunlop, The Mistral: A Windswept History of Modern France
- 2024 - Ari Joskowicz, Rain of Ash: Roma, Jews, and the Holocaust
- 2023 - Pamela H. Smith, From Lived Experience to the Written Word: Reconstructing Practical Knowledge in the Early Modern World
- 2022 - Kira L. Thurman, Singing Like Germans: Black Musicians in the Land of Bach, Beethoven, and Brahms
- 2021 - Magda Teter, Blood Libel: On the Trail of an Antisemitic Myth
- 2020 - Joan Neuberger, This Thing of Darkness: Eisenstein’s Ivan the Terrible in Stalin’s Russia
- 2019 - Guy Beiner, Forgetful Remembrance: Social Forgetting and Vernacular Historiography of a Rebellion in Ulster
- 2018 - Yuri Slezkine, The House of Government: A Saga of the Russian Revolution
- 2017 - James T. Kloppenberg, Toward Democracy: The Struggle for Self-Rule in European and American Thought
- 2016 - Thomas Laqueur, The Work of the Dead: A Cultural History of Mortal Remains
- 2015 - Ekaterina Pravilova, A Public Empire: Property and the Quest for the Common Good in Imperial Russia
- 2014 - Derek Sayer, Prague, Capital of the Twentieth Century: A Surrealist History
- 2013 - Miranda Spieler, Empire and Underworld: Captivity in French Guiana
- 2012 - Sophus A. Reinert, Translating Empire: Emulation and the Origins of Political Economy
- 2011 - James Johnson, Venice Incognito: Masks in the Serene Republic
- 2010 - Suzanne L. Marchand, German Orientalism in the Age of Empire
- 2009 - Stuart Schwartz, All Can Be Saved: Religious Tolerance and Salvation in the Iberian Atlantic World
- 2008 - Atina Grossmann, Jews, Germans, and Allies: Close Encounters in Occupied Germany
- 2007 - David Blackbourn, The Conquest of Nature: Water, Landscape, and the Making of Modern Germany
- 2006 - Sandra Herbert, Charles Darwin, Geologist
- 2005 - Jonathan Sheehan, The Enlightenment Bible: Translation, Scholarship, Culture
- 2004 - Siep Stuurman, Francois Poulain de la Barre and the Invention of Modern Equality
- 2003 - Sarah Maza, The Myth of the French Bourgeoises: An Essay on the Social Imaginary, 1750-1850
- 2002 - Anthony LaVopa, Fichte: The Self and the Calling of Philosophy, 1762-99
- 2001 - Lionel Gossman, Basel in the Age of Burckhardt: A Study in Unseasonable Ideas
- 2000 - Richard Wortman, Scenarios of Power: Myth and Ceremony in Russian Monarchy: From Alexander II to the Abdication of Nicholas II

== See also ==
- List of history awards
