= Guy Beiner =

Israeli historian

- גיא ביינר
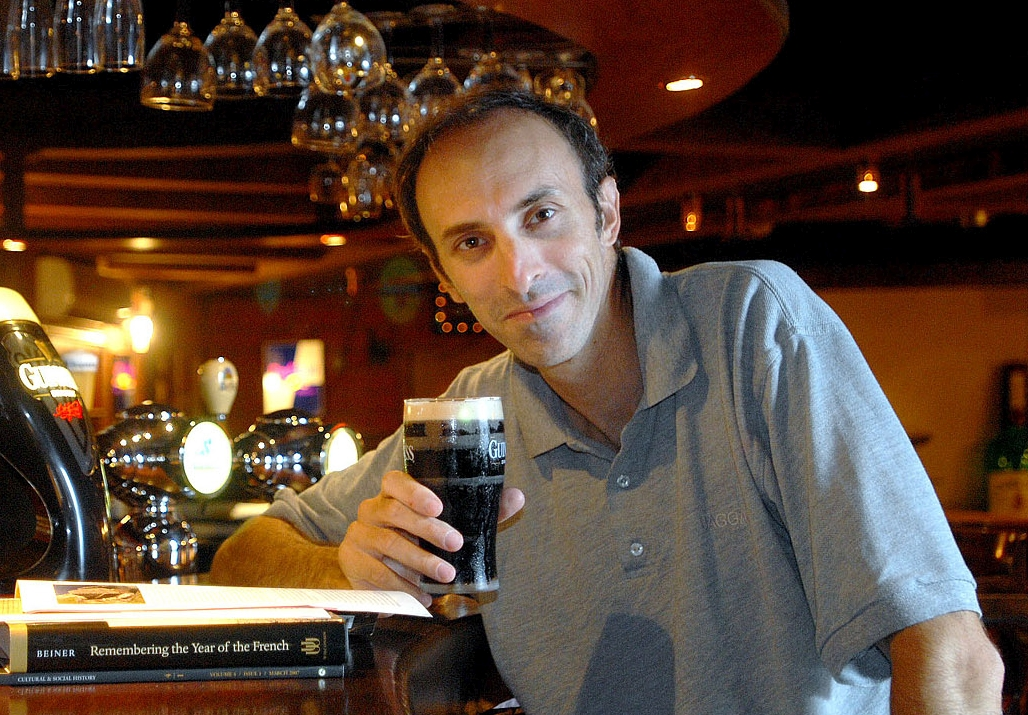
- Born: 1968 (age 57–58); Jerusalem
- Awards: George L. Mosse Prize; Katharine Briggs Award; Irish Historical Research Prize; Ratcliff Prize; Wayland D. Hand Prize

Academic background
- Education: Tel Aviv University; University College Dublin

Academic work
- Discipline: Historian
- Institutions: Ben-Gurion University of the Negev; Boston College
- Main interests: Memory studies, Irish studies, Oral history, Oral tradition, Folklore, Spanish flu, History of terrorism
- Website: Guy Beiner

Guy Beiner (Hebrew: גיא ביינר) is an Israeli-born historian of the late-modern period with particular expertise in Irish history and memory studies. He is the Sullivan Chair of Irish Studies at Boston College.

== Academic career ==
Guy Beiner was born and raised in Jerusalem and later moved to kibbutz Glil Yam. After traveling abroad, he relocated to the Negev region. Beiner is a graduate of Tel Aviv University and holds a PhD from the University College Dublin (UCD). He was a Government of Ireland Scholar at UCD, an Irish Research Council for Humanities and Social Sciences (IRCHSS) Fellow at Trinity College Dublin, a National Endowment for the Humanities (NEH) Fellow at the Keough-Naughton Institute for Irish Studies in the University of Notre Dame, a Government of Hungary Fellow at the Central European University in Budapest, a Gerda Henkel Marie Curie Fellow at the Faculty of History of the University of Oxford, a research associate of St Catherine's College, Oxford and a Burns Scholar at Boston College.

He was appointed full professor at Ben-Gurion University of the Negev in Beer Sheva, Israel. At Ben-Gurion University, he repeatedly received the Rector's prize for teaching excellence and was twice the recipient of the David and Luba Glatt Prize for Exceptional Excellence in Teaching. In September 2021, he was named the Sullivan Chair in Irish Studies at Boston College, becoming the director of Irish studies and a professor in the history department.

== Research ==
Beiner's research has largely been devoted to the study of remembrance and forgetting in modern history, with a particular interest in Ireland. He has also published on other subjects, including oral history, the influenza pandemic of 1918-19, and the history of terrorism. In recent years, he has primarily focused on advancing the historical study of "social forgetting". His academic work is distinguished for its innovative interrogation of less-conventional sources drawn from popular culture and in particular folklore. He has developed the term "vernacular historiography" (in place of folk memory) in order to broaden the scope of historical investigations of unofficial sources and to explore the interfaces of oral traditions with popular print and various other media, including visual and material culture. He has repeatedly called for a critical rethinking of the concept of invented tradition, as first introduced in a seminal collection of essays edited by Eric Hobsbawm and Terence Ranger.

In his contributions to memory studies, Beiner's critique of less-reflective uses of the term collective memory, has led him to explore more sophisticated categorizations of social remembrance and to develop the study of "social forgetting". He has also contested the validity of conventional use of the term "postmemory" (as coined by Marianne Hirsch), suggesting in its place alternative conceptualizations of "postmemory", introducing a corresponding concept of "pre-memory" (when the memory of an event is shaped by memories of earlier events), and adding an original notion of "pre-forgetting" (with reference to concerns over the forgetting of an event that are raised prior to when it occurs). Examining modern cases of destruction of monuments, with reference to classical scholarship on damnatio memoriae, Beiner has argued that political iconoclasm does not necessary efface memory but in effect can instigate ambiguous remembrance, through which the former sites of commemoration and the acts of destruction continue to be recalled locally. While his case studies are often grounded in modern Irish history, Beiner has demonstrated the broader applicability of his theoretical innovations for historical studies elsewhere.

== Critical reception ==
His book Remembering the Year of the French: Irish Folk History and Social Memory (University of Wisconsin Press: Madison, 2007; paperback 2009) won a number of international awards, including the 2007 Ratcliff Prize for "an important contribution by an individual to the study of Folklore or Folk Life in Great Britain and Ireland" and the 2008 Wayland D. Hand Prize for an outstanding publication in history and folklore. It was a finalist for 2008 National Council on Public History (NCPH) Book Award, commended for "outstanding contribution in the subfield of public history and policy", and was listed for the 2008 Cundill International Prize in History for a book determined to have a profound literary, social and academic impact in the area of history.

His book Forgetful Remembrance: Social Forgetting and Vernacular Historiography of a Rebellion in Ulster (Oxford University Press: Oxford and New York, 2018; paperback 2020) won the 2019 George L. Mosse Prize for "an outstanding major work of extraordinary scholarly distinction, creativity, and originality in the intellectual and cultural history of Europe since the Renaissance", the 2019 Katharine Briggs Award for "the most distinguished contribution to folklore studies", the 2019 Irish Historical Research Prize awarded biannually by the National University of Ireland for "the best new work of Irish Historical Research", the 2020 Wayland D. Hand Prize for "the best book combining historical and folkloristic methods and materials", and received an Honorable Mention for the James S. Donnelly, Sr., Prize for Books in History and Social Sciences. It was short-listed for the Christopher Ewart-Biggs Memorial Prize and listed as a book of the year for 2018 in the Times Literary Supplement, subsequently appearing in the Private Eye books of the year as "Best Flying the Green Flag". The American historian Jay Winter described the book as "'bottom-up' history at its best" and the French historian Pierre Nora asserted that "Guy Beiner has contributed to opening a new page in the history of memory, that of forgetting. He writes about the particular case of Ireland but the perspectives which he opens concern all historians of memory." Commenting on the book, Ian McBride, the Foster Professor of Irish History at the University of Oxford, wrote that Beiner's "intellectual ambition puts him in a different league from most Irish historians of his generation".

== Publications ==
- Remembering the Year of the French: Irish Folk History and Social Memory (University of Wisconsin Press: Madison, 2007) Google Books
- Forgetful Remembrance: Social Forgetting and Vernacular Historiography of a Rebellion in Ulster (Oxford University Press: Oxford and New York, 2018) Google Books
- Pandemic Re-Awakenings: The Forgotten and Unforgotten 'Spanish' Flu of 1918-1919 (Oxford University Press: Oxford and New York, 2020) Google Books

== Sources ==
- Guy Beiner at academia.edu
- Guy Beiner at ResearchGate
- Guy Beiner at the Dept. of General History, Ben-Gurion University of the Negev
- Guy Beiner at the Keough-Naughton Institute for Irish Studies website
- Cundill International Prize in History longlist annunciation
- Gabriel Sanders, "Israeli Scholar Trains an Eye on the Emerald Isle", Forward (March, 2007)
