= Henry Friedlander =

American historian (1930-2012)

- Born: Heinz Egon Friedländer; 24 September 1930; Berlin, Germany
- Died: 17 October 2012 (aged 82); Bangor, Maine, U.S.
- Education: University of Pennsylvania; Temple University
- Scientific career
- Fields: Historian
- Workplaces: City University of New York

Henry Egon Friedlander (24 September 1930 – 17 October 2012) was a German-American Jewish historian of the Holocaust who was noted for his arguments in favor of broadening the scope of casualties of the Holocaust.

Born in Berlin, Germany, to a Jewish family, Friedlander moved to the United States in 1947 as a survivor of Auschwitz, obtaining his BA in history at Temple University in 1953 and his MA and PhD at the University of Pennsylvania in 1954 and 1968.

From 1975 until his retirement in 2001, Friedlander served as a professor in the department of Judaic studies at Brooklyn College of the City University of New York.

== Personal life ==
The son of physician Bernhard Fritz Friedländer and Ruth Friedländer, née Löwenthal, Henry Friedlander was married to fellow historian Sybil Milton (1941–2000), who has a German Studies Association memorial prize named after her.

== Views on the Holocaust ==
Friedlander argued that three groups should be considered victims of the Holocaust, namely Jews, Romani, and the mentally and physically disabled, noting that the latter were Nazism's first victims. His opinions concerning the inclusion of both the disabled and the Romani as victims of the Holocaust often gave rise to intense debates with other scholars, such as the Israeli historian Yehuda Bauer, who argued that only Jews should be considered victims of the Holocaust.

Like Friedlander, Sybil Milton supported a more expansive, inclusive definition of the Holocaust, arguing against the "exclusivity of emphasis on Judeocide in most Holocaust literature [that] has generally excluded Gypsies (as well as blacks and the handicapped) from equal consideration", and exchanging views on the topic with Yehuda Bauer.

According to Friedlander, the origins of the Holocaust can be traced back to the coming together of two lines of Nazi policies: the antisemitic policies of the Nazi regime, and its "racial cleansing" policies that led to the Action T4 program. Arguing that the ultimate origins of the Holocaust came from the Action T4 program, he pointed to the fact that both the poison gas and the crematoria were originally deployed at the start of the Action T4 program in 1939. It was only later, in 1941, that the experts from the T4 program were imported by the SS to help design, and later run, the death camps for the Jews of Europe. Friedlander did not deny the importance of the Nazi's antisemitic ideology, but, in his view, the T4 program was the crucial seed that gave birth to the Holocaust.

== Work ==
=== Books ===
- Foreword to People in Auschwitz by Hermann Langbein, Chapel Hill: The University of North Carolina Press, 2004, ISBN 0-8078-2816-5.
- The Origins of Nazi Genocide: From Euthanasia To The Final Solution. Chapel Hill, NC: University of North Carolina Press. 1995.
- The German Revolution of 1918. New York, NY: Garland Pub. 1992.
- Archives of the Holocaust: An International Collection Of Selected Documents. Co-editor with Sybil Milton. New York, NY: Garland Pub. 1989.
- The Holocaust: Ideology, Bureaucracy, and Genocide. The San Jose Papers. Co-editor with Sybil Milton. Millwood, NY: Kraus International Publications. 1980.
- Détente in Historical Perspective: The First CUNY Conference on History and Politics. New York, NY: Cyrco Press. 1975.

=== Articles ===
- Friedlander, Henry (1997). "Registering the Handicapped in Nazi Germany: A Case Study". Jewish History. 11 (2): 89–98. doi:10.1007/bf02335679. JSTOR 20101303. S2CID 145493803.
- Friedlander, Henry (1994). "Step by Step: The Expansion of Murder, 1939–1941". German Studies Review. 17 (3): 495–507. doi:10.2307/1431896. JSTOR 1431896.

== See also ==
- Nazi eugenics
- Richard Jenne

== Sources ==
- Bauer, Yehuda; Milton, Sybil (1992). "Correspondence: 'Gypsies and the Holocaust'". The History Teacher. 25 (4): 513–521. doi:10.2307/494357. JSTOR 494357.
- Milton, Sybil (1991). "Gypsies and the Holocaust". The History Teacher. 24 (4): 375–387. doi:10.2307/494697. JSTOR 494697.
- Andreas W. Daum, "Refugees from Nazi Germany as Historians: Origins and Migrations, Interests and Identities", in The Second Generation: Émigrés from Nazi Germany as Historians. With a Biobibliographic Guide, ed. Andreas W. Daum, Hartmut Lehmann, James J. Sheehan. New York: Berghahn Books, 2016, ISBN 978-1-78238-985-9, pp. 1‒52.
