= Beata Rank =

Beata Rank-Minzer, born Beata Minzer or Munzer, known to friends by the nickname Tola (February 16, 1886 – April 11, 1961) was a Polish-American psychoanalyst.

== Life ==
Beata Minzer was born on February 16, 1886, in Nowy Sącz, Poland, then part of Galicia Austria-Hungary. Her aunt introduced her to Otto Rank, who was stationed in Kraków editing the Krakauer Zeitung from 1916 to 1918. They married in a Jewish wedding ceremony on November 7, 1918, days before the end of World War I. The couple moved to Vienna soon afterwards, where Otto took her to present to Sigmund Freud as a sort of 'court presentation'. Their only child, Helene, was born in August 1919.

Though Freud's initial impression of Beata Rank had been unfavourable - "a little Polish-Jewish wife whom no-one finds congenial and who betrays no higher interests" – he soon revised his opinion. She became Freud's hostess for social events, entertaining visitors like Lou Andreas-Salomé. She attended lectures and seminars on psychoanalysis. Like Anna Freud – who felt some rivalry towards her – she took dictation from Freud in the publication of Imago. In 1923 she translated Freud's On Dreams – an abridged version of The Interpretation of Dreams – into Polish. A 1923 paper on the role of women in the development of human society, which integrated Freud's theory of Oedipal conflict with Bachofen's' mother-right theory, gained her entry to the Vienna Psychoanalytical Society.

Beata Rank always kept a good personal relationship with Freud. However, her emphasis on the importance of women may well have encouraged Otto Rank's increasing theoretical emphasis on the mother-child relationship, an element in what became his split from Freud. Otto started visiting the United States in 1924, though Beata did not want to move there. After his break from Freud, the couple compromised by moving Paris in 1926. There she continued researching the role of women, using the Bibliotheque Nationale. In 1933 she worked with Otto as an administrator for the Summer Institute of his Psychological Center, but in 1934 he left her.

Beata Rank remained in Paris with her daughter until 1936, when they emigrated to Boston. The Boston psychoanalytic community included her old friends Helene and Felix Deutsch. She worked there as a child analyst and as a training analyst at the Boston Psychoanalytic Institute.

Beata Rank died in Boston on April 11, 1961.

== Works ==
- 'Zur Rolle der Frau in der Entwicklung der menschlichen Gesellschaft' [On the role of the woman in the development of human society], Imago, Vol. 10 (1924), pp. 278–295.
- 'Where child analysis stands today', American Imago, Vol. 3, No. 3 (1942). pp. 41–60.
- (with Marion C. Putnam and G. Rochlin) 'The Significance of "Emotional Climate" in Early Feeding Difficulties', Psychosomatic Medicine, Vol. 10, No. 5 (1948), pp. 279–83
- 'Adaptation of the psychoanalytic technique for the treatment of young children with atypical development', American Journal of Orthopsychiatry, Vol. 19 (1949), pp. 130–139.
- 'Aggression', in Phyllis Greenacre et al., eds., The psychoanalytic study of the child, Vol. 3-4 (1949).
- 'Intensive study and treatment of pre-school children who show marked personality deviations, or atypical development and their parents', in G. Caplan, ed., Emotional problems of early childhood: Proceedings of the International Institute of Child Psychiatry, New York: Basic, pp. 491–501.
