= Marianne Hirsch =

American professor of English and Comparative Literature

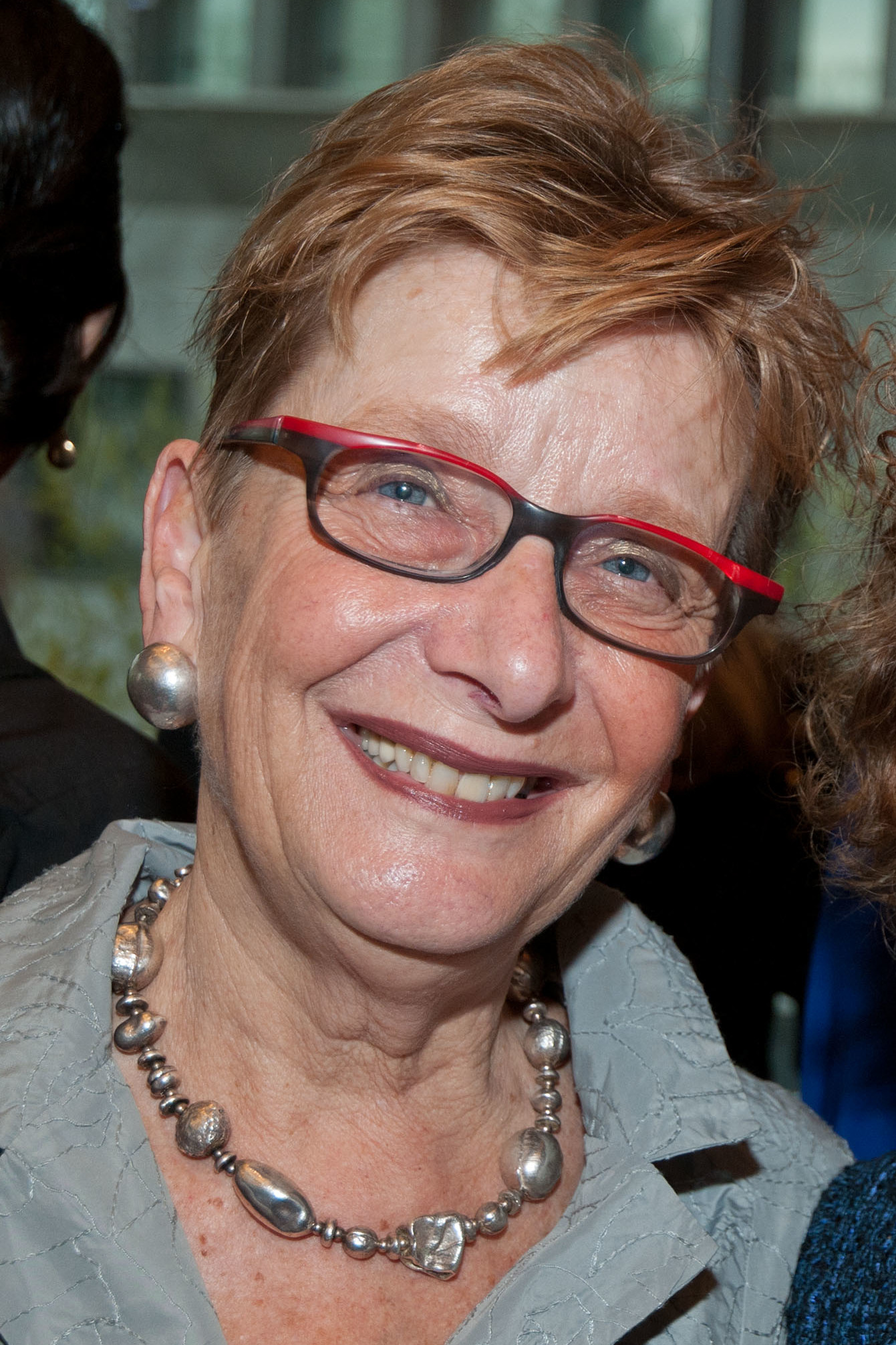
- Born: September 23, 1949 (age 77); Timișoara, Romania

Academic background
- Education: Brown University (A.B., A.M., Ph.D)

Academic work
- Institutions: Dartmouth College; Columbia University

Marianne Hirsch (born September 23, 1949) is the William Peterfield Trent Professor of English and Comparative Literature at Columbia University and Professor in the Institute for Research on Women, Gender, and Sexuality. Her scholarship has focused on memory studies, feminist theory, and transgenerational trauma, especially after the Holocaust. She is a member of the American Academy of Arts and Sciences and was formerly president of the Modern Language Association.

== Biography ==
Born in Timișoara, Romania, where her parents Carl Hirsch, a Jewish engineer, and Lotte Hirsch, née Gottfried, fled from Czernowitz, Hirsch immigrated to the United States in 1962. She completed her B.A., M.A. and Ph.D. degrees at Brown University before becoming a professor at Dartmouth College, where she taught for thirty years. She was also one of the founders of the Women's Studies Program at Dartmouth, and served as Chair of Comparative Literature for a number of years. Hirsch has received fellowships from the Guggenheim Foundation, the National Humanities Center, the American Council of Learned Societies, the Bellagio and Bogliasco Foundations, the Mary Ingraham Bunting Institute, and the Stellenbosch Institute for Advanced Studies, among others. She is past president of the Modern Language Association, and has served on the MLA Executive Council, the ACLA Advisory Board, the Executive Board of the Society for the Study of Narrative Literature, and the Board of Supervisors of The English Institute. She is also on the advisory boards of Memory Studies and Contemporary Women's Writing. A founder of Columbia's Center for the Study of Social Difference and its global initiative "Women Creating Change", much of Hirsch's work concerns feminist theory, memory studies, and photography.

In 1992, Hirsch introduced the term "postmemory," a concept that has subsequently been cited in hundreds of books and articles. The term was originally used primarily to refer to the relationship between the children of Holocaust survivors and the memories of their parents, but has been expanded over time. In "Family Frames: photography, narrative, and postmemory", Hirsch explained that "postmemory is a powerful and very particular form of memory precisely because its connection to its object or source is mediated not through recollection but through an imaginative investment and creation. This is not to say that memory itself is not unmediated, but that it is more directly connected to the past. Postmemory characterizes the experiences of those who grow up dominated by narratives that preceded their birth, whose own belated stories are evacuated by the stories of the previous generation shaped by traumatic events that can be neither understood nor recreated." Now, the concept has evolved beyond these familial and generational restrictions to describe "the relationship that later generations or distant contemporary witnesses bear to the personal, collective, and cultural trauma of others—to experiences they 'remember' or know only by means of stories, images, and behaviors." Historian Guy Beiner has criticized the extent of the use of the term in Memory Studies and suggested alternative ways in which it can be re-conceptualized as a more challenging analytical category. In 2015, the Journal of Trauma and Literature Studies dedicated a special issue to the notion of postmemory.

Hirsch's newest monograph, co-authored with Leo Spitzer, is School Pictures in Liquid Time: Reframing Difference (University of Washington Press, 2019). Her other books include The Generation of Postmemory: Writing and Visual Culture After the Holocaust (Columbia University Press, 2012), Ghosts of Home: The Afterlife of Czernowitz in Jewish Memory, co-authored with Leo Spitzer (University of California Press, 2010), and Family Frames: Photography, Narrative, and Postmemory (1997).

Edited and co-edited collections include Women Mobilizing Memory, co-edited with Ayşe Gül Altınay, Maria Jose Contreras, Jean Howard, Banu Karaca, and Alisa Solomon (Columbia University Press, 2019), Imagining Everyday Life: Engagements With Vernacular Photography, co-edited with Tina Campt, Gil Hochberg, and Brian Wallis (Steidl, 2019), Rites of Return: Diaspora, Poetics and the Politics of Memory, co-edited with Nancy K. Miller (Columbia University Press, 2011), Grace Paley Writing the World (co-ed. 2009), Teaching the Representation of the Holocaust (co-ed. 2004), Time and the Literary (co-ed. 2002), and The Familial Gaze (ed. 1999). She also co-edited the Summer 2012 issue of e-misférica titled "On the Subject of Archives" with Diana Taylor and a special issue of Signs on "Gender and Cultural Memory" (2002).

Following the protests at Columbia University in opposition to the Gaza war and genocide and the university's incorporation of the IHRA definition of antisemitism as part of its settlement with the Trump administration, Hirsch said that the restrictions imposed by Columbia's incorporation of the definition amounted to "clear censorship" and said she was considering leaving the university.

== Monographs ==
- Beyond the Single Vision: Henry James, Michel Butor, Uwe Johnson. French Literature Publications Co., 1981.
- The Mother / Daughter Plot: Narrative, Psychoanalysis, Feminism. Indiana University Press, 1989.
- Family Frames: Photography, Narrative, and Postmemory. Harvard University Press, 1997.
- Ghosts of Home: The Afterlife of Czernowitz in Jewish Memory, co-written with Leo Spitzer. University of California Press, 2010.
- The Generation of Postmemory: Writing and Visual Culture After the Holocaust. Columbia University Press, 2012.
- School Pictures in Liquid Time: Reframing Difference, co-written with Leo Spitzer. University of Washington Press, 2019.

== Translations ==
- Marcos familiares [Family Frames], Buenos Aires: Prometeo Editorial, 2019.
- La Generación de la posmemoria: Escritura y cultura visual después del holocausto [The Generation of Postmemory], Madrid: Editorial Carpe Nortem, 2015.
- Поколение постпамяти: Письмо и визуальная культура после Холокоста [The Generation of Postmemory]. Translated by Nikolai Epplée. Moscow: Novoye izdatelstvo, 2021.

== Edited collections ==
- The Voyage In: Fictions of Female Development, co-edited with Elizabeth Abel and Elizabeth Langland. University Press of New England, 1983.
- Conflicts in Feminism, co-edited with Evelyn Fox Keller. Routledge, 1990.
- Ecritures de femmes: Nouvelles cartographies, co-edited with MaryAnn Caws, Mary Jean Green, Ronnie Scharfman. Yale University Press, 1996.
- The Familial Gaze, editor. Dartmouth, 1999.
- Time and the Literary, co-edited with Karen Newman and Jay Clayton. Routledge, 2002.
- Teaching the Representation of the Holocaust, co-edited with Irene Kacandes. The Modern Language Association of America, 2004.
- Rites of Return: Diaspora, Poetics and the Politics of Memory, co-edited with Nancy K. Miller. Columbia University Press, 2011.
- Imagining Everyday Life: Engagements With Vernacular Photography, co-edited with Tina Campt, Gil Hochberg, and Brian Wallis. Steidl, 2019.
- Women Mobilizing Memory, co-edited with Ayse Gul Altinay, Maria Jose Contreras, Jean Howard, Banu Karaca, and Alisa Solomon. Columbia University Press, 2019.

== Public interventions ==
- "In Conversation with Dr. Marianne Hirsch on Inherited Memory," part 1 of 9, Contemporary Jewish Museum, May 22, 2019.
- "Three Lessons About Autocracy I Learned as a Child in Communist Romania," op-ed in TruthOut.org, March 9, 2017.
- "We Can’t Turn Our Backs on 'Stateless' Youth," blog post in the Los Angeles Review of Books, September 30, 2017.
- "Stateless Memories," keynote for the Second Annual Conference of the Memory Studies Association, Copenhagen, Denmark, December 2017.
- "Portraits: Marianne Hirsch," Fondation Auschwitz, November 19, 2015.
- "From the President: Columns by Marianne Hirsch," Modern Language Association, 2013.
- "On the Subject of Archives," special issue of e-misférica, co-edited with Diana Taylor, vol. 9, iss. 1 & 2, summer 2012.
