= Irish Historical Research Prize =

Biennial book prize

The Irish Historical Research Prize is a history book prize awarded biannually since 1922 by the National University of Ireland (NUI) to a senior historian for the best new work of research on any period in the history of Ireland. It is considered the most prestigious prize in the study of Irish history.

== Description ==
The Irish Historical Research Prize is the paramount award among the hundreds of awards, prizes and grants offered by the NUI (a federal academic body which is the largest element of the Irish university system). In order to be eligible to apply for the prize, candidates must be graduates of the NUI (i.e. one of its four constituent universities, two recognized colleges or five colleges of a constituent university) and the work submitted for the competition must be substantial and of an original character, indicating direct research in historical records.

Over the course of a century, the prize has been awarded to some of the most eminent historians of Ireland. Notable winners include Richard F. Hayes (1933), Robert Dudley Edwards (1935), G. A. Hayes-McCoy (1937 & 1969), Hugh Kearney (1959), Maureen Wall (1961), Kevin B Nowlan (1967), Nicholas Canny (1977 & 2003), Karl T. Hoppen (1985 & 2017), Jacinta Prunty (1997), Maurice Bric (2009), Bernadette Cunningham (2011), Elva Johnston (2013), and the Israeli historian Guy Beiner (2019), who stands out for not having been born or raised in Ireland (but graduated from University College Dublin and holds a PhD from NUI).

In the years following its inauguration in 1922, the Irish Historical Research Prize stood at 100 pounds. In the late 1990s, as the National University of Ireland underwent transformation and the constituent colleges became universities in their own right, the value of the Irish Historical Research Prize was increased substantially to 2,000 Irish pounds. Since then it has been periodically updated. In 2003, the prize was 3,000 Euros and in 2007 it stood at 5,000 Euros. It is currently valued at 7,500 Euros.

In 1929 the prize was shared between three recipients – John C. Conroy, John J. Webb and Helena Concannon (each awarded 25 pounds) and in 1977 it was shared jointly by Nicholas P. Canny (for The Elizabethan Conquest of Ireland) and by Ruth Dudley Edwards (for Patrick Pearse: The Triumph of Failure) (whose father, Robert Dudley Edwards, had received the prize in 1935 for Church and State in Tudor Ireland)). The prize was not awarded in 1941, 1951, 1953, 1955, 1965, 1971, 1975, 1979, 1991, 1993 and 1995. Occasionally, a Special Commendation Prize is awarded, alongside the prize, to a runner-up.

It has been incorrectly claimed that the Galway historian Nicholas P. Canny is the only person to have won the prize twice (in 1977 for The Elizabethan Conquest of Ireland and in 2003 for Making Ireland British, 1580-1650), when in fact this achievement has also been accomplished by the military historian Gerald A. Hayes-McCoy (in 1937 for Scots, Mercenary Forces in Ireland, 1563-1603 and in 1969 for Irish Battles), Karl T. Hoppen of the University of Hull (in 1985 for Elections, Politics and Society in Ireland, 1832-1885 and in 2017 for Governing Hibernia: British Politicians and Ireland, 1800-1921) and by the Limerick historian Patrick J. O’Connor, who won the prize consecutively (in 1987 for Exploring Limerick's Past and in 1989 for People Make Places: The Story of Irish Palatines).

The NUI also offers a more junior Publication Prize in Irish History, intended for historians at an early stage of their academic careers and valued at 3,500 Euros. First introduced in 2008 as a NUI Centennial Award, it has since been awarded on alternative years for a first sole authored book written by an NUI graduate of doctoral status.

== Recipients ==
2019 Guy Beiner, Forgetful Remembrance: Social Forgetting and Vernacular Historiography of a Rebellion in Ulster (Oxford University Press).
2017 Karl Theodore Hoppen, Governing Ireland: British Politicians and Ireland 1800-1921 (Oxford University Press).
2015 Elva Johnston, Literacy and Identity in Medieval Ireland (Boydell & Brewer).
2013 Colmán Ó Clabaigh. The Friars in Ireland, 1224-1540 (Four Courts Press).
2011 Bernadette Cunningham, The Annals of the Four Masters: Irish History, Kingship and Society in the Early Seventeenth Century (Four Courts Press).
2009 Maurice Bric, Ireland, Philadelphia and the Re-Invention of America 1760-1800 (Four Courts Press).
2007 William J. Smyth, Map-making, Landscapes and Memory: A Geography of Colonial and Early Modern Ireland, c. 1530-1750 (Cork University Press).
