= The House of Government =

Book by Yuri Slezkine

The House of Government:A Saga of the Russian Revolution
- Author: Yuri Slezkine
- Language: English
- Subject: History of the Russian Revolution
- Published: 2017
- Publisher: Princeton University Press
- Publication place: United States
- Media type: Print
- Pages: xv, 1104 p. (2018 Princeton 1st edition)
- ISBN: 9780691176949
- Dewey Decimal: 947.084
- LC Class: 2016049071

The House of Government: A Saga of the Russian Revolution is a 2017 study of the history of the Russian Revolution, the formation of the Soviet Union, and its early history from the days of the New Economic Policy into the early days of Stalinist Rule by the Russian-born American historian Yuri Slezkine. The book consists of "three strains": "The first is a family saga involving numerous named and unnamed residents of the House of Government." The second strain is analytical. It looks at the revolution and subsequent Soviet administration through the lens of the millenarian cult and "aims to capture the rise and fall of Bolshevism through a building and its residents, via a study in eschatology – the creation of an apocalyptic cult, its unexpected success, and its equally unexpected failure." "The third strain is literary...Each episode in the Bolshevik Family Saga, and each stage in the history of the Bolshevik prophecy is accompanied by a discussion of the literary works that sought to interpret and mythologize them."

== Contents ==
The work includes a brief preface, three books (each separated into two parts), an epilogue, an appendix providing "a partial list of leaseholders", notes, and an index.

=== Book 1: En Route ===
==== Part I: Anticipation ====
- The Swamp - A portrait of Moscow prior to the construction of The House of Government, before the Bolshevik Revolution. "When Will The Real Day Finally Come?" asks Nikolai Dobroliubov in an 1860 essay, pondering the proximity of a revolutionary transformation of society. This question—and "The Real Day"—become a motif.
- The Preachers - "Most prophets of the Real Day were either Christians or socialists."
- The Faith - Slezkine outlines the senses in which it is helpful to consider the Bolshevik Revolution and its subsequent manifestations as millenarian cult.

==== Part II: Fulfillment ====
- The Real Day - Chronicling events from two days after the collapse of the Tsarist State, to the execution of the Tsarist royal family at the House of Special Purpose.
- The Last Battle - Chaos and struggle after the early victories. The attempted assassination of V. Lenin, problems with the cossacks, de-cossackization etc.
- The New City - Having won the war, taken over the state, established stable administrative hierarchies the Bolsheviks reflect and prophecy, but real events deviate from prophecy very quickly as "War Communism"—the war on property, market, money and the division of labor—quickly exhausts itself in the pre-industrial, peasant economy the Bolsheviks become heir to.
- The Great Disappointment - New theories of art and literature evolve under the New Economic Policy, Lenin dies, Mayakovsky commits suicide, "the NEP was a gothic nightmare."
- The Party Line - As the world socialist revolution continues not to materialize, the Party re-assesses and its theory evolves.

=== Book 2: At Home ===
==== Part III: The Second Coming ====
- The Eternal House
- The New Tenants
- The Economic Foundations
- The Virgin Lands
- The Ideological Substance

==== Part IV: The Reign of the Saints ====
- The New Life
- The Days Off
- The Houses of Rest
- The Next of Kin
- The Center of the World
- The Pettiness of Existence
- The Thought of Death
- The Happy Childhood
- The New Men

=== Book 3: On Trial ===
==== Part V: The Last Judgment ====
- The Telephone Call
- The Admission of Guilt
- The Valley of the Dead
- The Knock on the Door
- The Good People
- The Supreme Penalty

==== Part VI: The Afterlife ====
- The End of Childhood
- The Persistence of Happiness
- The Coming of War
- The Return
- The End

== Reception ==
The book received critical praise for its epic scope and storytelling from several outlets, including The New Yorker and The Washington Times. The New York Times and the London Review of Books, while concurring on praise for its exploration of the house's inhabitants, questioned some of Slezkine's conclusions, and The Guardian criticized the book's interpretation of Bolshevism.

The House of Government won the George L. Mosse Prize from the American Historical Association.
