= Suzanne J. Levinson Prize =

- Presented by: History of Science Society
- First award: 2006
- Website: hssonline.org/about/honors/suzanne-j-levinson-prize/

The Suzanne J. Levinson Prize is a prize of the History of Science Society, awarded biennially and established in 2006. The prize is given to the author of "a book in the history of the life sciences and natural history," published in the previous four years.

The following authors have won the Levinson Prize:

- 2006 Prize – Sandra Herbert, Charles Darwin: Geologist ISBN 978-0-8014-4348-0
- 2008 Prize – Hannah Landecker, Culturing Life: How Cells Became Technologies ISBN 978-0-674-02328-4
- 2010 Prize – Gregory Radick, The Simian Tongue: The Long Debate about Animal Language ISBN 978-0-226-70224-7.
- 2012 Prize – Martin Rudwick, Worlds before Adam: The Reconstruction of Geohistory in the Age of Reform ISBN 978-0-226-73128-5
- 2014 Prize – Daniela Bleichmar, Visible Empire.Botanical Expeditions and Visual Culture in the Hispanic Enlightenment ISBN 978-0-226-05853-5
- 2016 Prize – Nick Hopwood, Haeckel’s Embryos: Images, Evolution, and Fraud ISBN 978-0-226-04694-5
- 2018 Prize – Evelleen Richards, Darwin and the Making of Sexual Selection ISBN 978-0-226-43690-6
- 2020 Prize – Erika Lorraine Milam, Creatures of Cain: The Hunt for Human Nature in Cold War America ISBN 978-0-691-18188-2
- 2022 Prize – Jenny Bangham, Blood Relations: Transfusion and the Making of Human Genetics ISBN 978-0226740034
- 2024 Prize - Ruth Rogaski, Knowing Manchuria: Environments, the Senses, and Natural Knowledge on an Asian Borderland ISBN 9780226818801

== See also ==
- List of history awards
