= Wayland Hand =

American folklorist

Wayland Debs Hand (March 19, 1907, Auckland, New Zealand – October 22, 1986, Moon Township, Pennsylvania, United States) was an American folklorist.

== Biography ==
Hand was born in New Zealand, where his parents had emigrated. A few years after his birth, the family returned to Utah, where Hand grew up. He attended the University of Utah, where he received bachelor's and master's degrees in German in 1933 and 1934. He then earned a Ph.D. at the University of Chicago in 1936, writing his dissertation on German folk songs.

After spending a year as an instructor at the University of Minnesota, Hand joined the faculty at UCLA in 1940, where he established the university's folklore department. From 1961 until his retirement in 1974, Hand was Director of UCLA's Center for the Study of Comparative Folklore and Mythology. He was editor of the Journal of American Folklore from 1947–51 and president of the American Folklore Society from 1955-56. Hand is known for his 1964 book Popular Beliefs and Superstitions from North Carolina, considered one of the most complete and well-organized studies of superstition.

Over the course of his career, Hand collected an Archive of American Popular Beliefs and Superstitions containing over 2 million items. The archive forms the basis for UCLA's ongoing project to produce an Encyclopedia of Popular Beliefs and Superstitions.

Hand received numerous awards and honors including the Giuseppe Pitrè Prize for International Folklore (1965) and the Order of the Lion of Finland (1972).

Hand died of a heart attack on October 22, 1986, at Pittsburgh International Airport, while on his way to the annual meeting of the American Folklore Society. His papers and files are at Utah State University.

In his honor, the History and Folklore Section of the American Folklore Society (AFS) awards biannually the Wayland D. Hand Prize for an outstanding book that combines historical and folkloristic perspectives.

== Bibliography ==
- Humaniora: Essays in Literature, Folklore, and Bibliography: Honoring Archer Taylor on his Seventieth Birthday (1960)
- Popular Beliefs and Superstitions from North Carolina (1964)
- Eyes on Texas: Fifty Years of Folklore in the Southwest (1967)
- American Folk Legend: A Symposium (ed.) (1971)
- American Folk Medicine: A Symposium (ed.) (1976)

== See also ==
- Mieder, Wolfgang. "Wayland Debs Hand as Paremiologist," Proverbium: Yearbook of International Proverb

Scholarship 3 (1986), 5-8.
