= Nicholas Canny =

Irish historian and academic

Nicholas Patrick Canny
- Born: 4 January 1944 (age 82); Clifden
- Education: the University of Galway
- Occupations: Irish historian and academic

Nicholas Patrick Canny (born 1944) is an Irish historian and academic specializing in early modern Irish history. He has been a lecturer in Irish history at the University of Galway since 1972 and professor there from 1979 to 2011. He is emeritus Professor of History, University of Galway.

== Biography ==
Born at Clifden on 4 January 1944 to Cecil Canny and Helen Joyce, he was educated at Kilfenora national school, St. Flannan's College, Ennis, and University College Galway (now the University of Galway) from where he graduated with a BA in 1964, and an M.A. in 1967. Research student at the Institute of Historical Research, University of London, 1969–70, and graduated PhD from the University of Pennsylvania in 1971.

Since the mid-1970s, Canny has been a leading authority on early modern Irish history. He was a lecturer in Irish history at University of Galway from 1972 and professor there from 1979 to 2011. His first paper was published in 1970 and focused on Hugh O'Neill, 2nd Earl of Tyrone and in the subsequent years, additional examinations of Gaelic Ulster followed. His 1974 O'Donnell lecture (published in 1975), The formation of the Old-English elite in Ireland, was a ground-breaking study of that community. It was, however, his 1976 study The Elizabethan Conquest of Ireland: a Pattern Established, 1565–76 that brought him to international attention. This book built on his PhD studies in the United States. He is the only person to have won the Irish Historical Research Prize on two occasions, in 1976 for the above book and in 2003 for Making Ireland British 1580–1650.

In 1967 Canny was awarded the Ford Foundation fellowship to travel to the United States and carry out a PhD in history at the University of Pennsylvania. He completed this in 1971 and in subsequent years received a Fulbright-Hayes post-doctorate fellowship to study in Harvard and Yale. Canny's work is noticeable for its sharp examinations of the ideology of colonisation. He has contributed enormously to current understanding on the Spanish influences on English colonial policy in 16th-century Ireland. In addition, he has built hugely on David Beers Quinn's thesis of Ireland as a practising ground for English colonial policy in the Americas. This study was the basis of his PhD in the United States and Canny's research on this topic has demonstrated the extent of these parallels in a manner previously under appreciated. Canny's debates with fellow historians, Brendan Bradshaw of Cambridge University and Ciarán Brady of Trinity College, Dublin, on why the Reformation failed to reform more than 20% of the population of Ireland, and on the ideology of Edmund Spenser, have been major additions to historical debate in recent decades. Canny has so far written and/or edited nine major books and over fifty-five academic papers and reviews.

He was Founding Director of the Moore Institute at University of Galway from 2000 to 2011, and President of the Royal Irish Academy from 2008 to 2011. Between 2011 and 2016 he was a Member of the Scientific Council of the European Research Council. He was awarded the Cunningham Medal by the Royal Irish Academy in 2020.

Canny is a Fellow of The British Academy and a member of the American Philosophical Society.

== Works ==
=== Published books, edited and coedited ===
- The Elizabethan Conquest of Ireland : a Pattern Established, 1565=76 (Harvester Press, 1976).
- The Upstart Earl : a Study of the Social and Mental World of Richard Boyle, first earl of Cork, 1566–1643 (Cambridge University Press, 1982).
- From Reformation to Restoration : Ireland 1534–1660 (Dublin 1987); the third volume in the Helicon history of Ireland paperback series.
- Kingdom and Colony : Ireland in the Atlantic World 1560–1800 (Johns Hopkins University Press, 1987).
- The Westward Enterprise : English Activities in Ireland, the Atlantic and America, 1480–1650, edited together with K. R. Andrews and P. E. H. Hair (Liverpool University Press, 1978) a festschrift for David B. Quinn.
- Colonial Identity in the Atlantic World, 1500–1800, edited with Anthony Pagden (Princeton University Press, 1987).
- Europeans on the Move : Studies on European Migration, 1500–1800 edited by Nicholas Canny (Oxford University Press, 1994).
- Empire, Society, and Labor: Essays in Honor of Richard S. Dunn, edited together with Joe Illick and Gary B. Nash (College Park, Pa., published Spring 1997 as supplement no. 64 to Pennsylvania History).
- The Origins of Empire, British Overseas Enterprise to the Close of the Seventeenth Century ed., Nicholas Canny vol I of the five volume Oxford History of the British Empire (Oxford University Press,1998).
- Making Ireland British, 1580–1650 (Oxford University Press, 2001).

=== Papers, articles and review articles ===
- 'Hugh O'Neill and the changing face of Gaelic Ulster', in Studia Hibernica, X (1970), pp. 73–5.
- 'The treaty of Mellifont and the reorganisation of Ulster', in The Irish Sword, IX (1970) pp. 249–62.
- 'The Flight of the earls, 1607', in Irish Historical Studies, XVII (1971), pp. 380–99.
- 'Changing views on Gaelic Ireland', in Topic : 24 : Themes in Irish Culture (Washington, Pennsylvania. 1972), pp. 19–28.
- 'The ideology of English colonisation : from Ireland to America', in The William & Mary Quarterly, XXX(1973), pp. 575–98; subsequently reprinted in Colonial America : Essays in Politics and Social Development ed Stanley N. Katz and John M. Murrin (New York, Knopf, 1983), pp. 47–68; and to be reprinted yet again in Theories of Empire, 1450–1800, ed. David Armitage, (London, Variorum Press, 1998).
- The formation of the OldEnglish elite in Ireland, the National University of Ireland O'Donnell lecture for 1974 published in pamphlet form, Dublin 1975, pp. 37.
- 'Early Modern Ireland : an appraisal appraised', in Irish Economic & Social History, IV (1977), pp. 56–65.
- 'Dominant Minorities : English Settlers in Ireland and Virginia, 15501650', in Minorities in History ed. A.C. Hepburn (London, Arnold, 1978), pp. 51–69.
- 'Rowland White's "Discors Touching Ireland" [1569]', in Irish Historical Studies, XX (1977), pp. 439–63.
- 'Rowland White's "The Dyssorders of the Irisshery" [1571]', in Studia Hibernica, XIX (1979), pp. 147–60.
- 'Why the Reformation failed in Ireland : une question mal posée', in Journal of Ecclesiastical History, XXX (1979), pp. 423–50.
- 'Sixteenth Century Ireland : Themes and Sources', a debate with Dr. Brendan Bradshaw, Sussex Tapes, 1981.
- 'The AngloAmerican Colonial Experience', in Historical Journal, XXIV (1981), pp. 485–503.
- 'The Formation of the Irish Mind : Religion, Politics and Gaelic Irish Literature, 1580–1750', in Past & Present no. 95 (1982), pp. 91–116; subsequently reprinted in Nationalism and Popular Protest in Ireland, ed. C. H. E. Philpin (Cambridge, 1987), pp. 50–79.
- 'Edmund Spenser and the Development of an AngloIrish Identity', in Yearbook of English Studies, XIII (1983), pp. 119.
- 'Galway : from the Reformation to the Penal Laws', in Diarmuid Ó Cearbhaill ed., Galway : Town & Gown, 14841984 (Dublin, Gill & Macmillan, 1984), pp. 10–28.
- 'Fusion and Faction in Modern Ireland', in Comparative Studies in Society and History XXVI (1984), pp. 35265.
- 'Migration and Opportunity : Britain, Ireland and the New World', in Irish Economic & Social History XII (1985), pp. 732; subsequently included in slightly revised form as a chapter of Kingdom and Colony.
- Debate with Raymond Gillespie on Migration and Opportunity in Irish Economic & Social History, XIII (1986), pp. 96–100.
- 'The Power but not the Gory', in Times Literary Supplement, 19 Dec 1986, p. 14–32 : a review of New History of Ireland, vol. IV.
- 'Pádraigín Haicéad : an sagart agus an file i gcomhthéacs an aimsire', in Dúchas, 1983, 1984, 1985 (Dublin, 1986), pp. 820 [Pádraigín Haicéad the priest and the poet in the context of his time].
- 'Natives & Other Strangers : settlement, cultural assimilation and conflict', in Community, Culture & Conflict, ed. M.A.G. Ó Tuathaigh (Galway, 1986), pp. 116.
- 'The Irish Background to Penn's Experiment', in The World of William Penn, ed. R. S. Dunn and M. M. Dunn (Philadelphia,1986), pp. 139–56.
- 'Europeans Abroad : Problems, Perspectives and Possibilities', in Historical Journal, XXIX (1987), pp. 46979.
- 'Protestants, Planters and Apartheid in early modern Ireland', in Irish Historical Studies, XXV, (1986), pp. 105–15.
- 'The Birth of the Modern Constitution', in De Valera's Constitution and Ours, ed. Brian Farrell (Dublin, 1988), pp. 117.
- 'To Establish a Common Wealthe: Captain John Smith as New World Colonist', in Virginia Magazine of History & Biography XCVI (1988), pp. 213–22.
- Debate with Dr. Ciaran Brady on 'Spenser's Irish Crisis' in Past & Present 120 (1988), pp. 20115.
- 'Raleigh's Ireland', in Raleigh and Quinn : the Explorer and his Boswell, ed. H.G. Jones (Chapel Hill, N.C., 1987), pp. 86–101.
- 'Upper Ireland', in London Review of Books, 16 March 1989, pp. 89: a review of R.F. Foster, Modern Ireland, 1600–1972
- 'Conquest and Colonisation : the implications of these processes for Modern Irish History', in IrishAustralian Studies : Papers Delivered at the Fifth IrishAustralian Conference, ed. Oliver MacDonagh and W.F. Mandle (Canberra, 1988), pp. 4264.
- 'Early Modern Ireland, c.15001700', in The Oxford Illustrated History of Ireland, ed. R. F. Foster (Oxford, 1989), pp. 10460.
- 'Introduction : Spenser and Reform in Ireland' in Spenser and Ireland : an Interdisciplinary Perspective, ed., Patricia Coughlan (Cork, 1989), pp. 92–4.
- 'Uplift', in London Review of Books, 24 May 1990, pp. 223 : a review of Oliver MacDonagh, The Emancipist : Daniel O'Connell, 1830–1847.
- 'The British Atlantic World : Working Towards a Definition', in Historical Journal, XXXIII (1990), pp. 479–97.
- 'In Defence of the Constitution? : the nature of Irish revolt in the Seventeenth Century' in Culture et Pratiques Politiques en France et en Irlande, XVIeXVIIIe siècle ed. Louis Bergeron and L.M. Cullen (Paris, 1990), pp. 23–40.
- 'The Marginal Kingdom : Ireland as a Problem in the First British Empire', in Strangers within the Realm : Cultural Margins of the First British Empire, ed., Bernard Bailyn and Philip D. Morgan (Chapel Hill, 1991) pp. 35–66.
- 'Ireland: the Historical Context', in The Spenser Encyclopedia, ed. A.C. Hamilton et al. (Toronto, 1990), pp. 40–47.
- 'The Early Planters : Spenser and his Contemporaries', in The Field Day Anthology of Irish Writing, ed. Seamus Deane (Derry City & London, 1991), pp. 171–234; prepared with Andrew Carpenter.
- 'Remembering Columbus, 14921992', in Journal of Galway Archaeological & Historical Society XLIV (1992) pp. 110.
- 'The Attempted Anglicization of Ireland in the Seventeenth Century: an Exemplar of "British History"', in Three Nations a Common History c.1600–1920 ed. Ronald G. Asch (Bochum, Germany, Universitatsverlag Dr. N. Brockmeyer, 1993), pp. 4982; reprinted in The Political World of Thomas Wentworth, earl of Strafford, 1621-1641, ed. Julia Merritt, (Cambridge, 1996).
- 'The 1641 Depositions as a Source for the Writing of Social History : County Cork as a Case Study', in Cork: History and Society ed. Patrick O'Flanagan and Neil Buttimer (Dublin, 1993), pp. 249–308.
- '1641 Depositions : a Source for Social and Cultural History', in History Ireland, vol. 1, no.4 (1993), pp. 52–55.
- Irish Resistance to Empire? : 1641, 1690 and 1798', in An Imperial State at War ed. Lawrence Stone (London, Routledge, 1994) pp. 288–321.
- 'What Really Happened in Ireland in 1641?', in Ireland: From Independence to Occupation, 1641–1660, ed. Jane Ohlmeyer (Cambridge, 1995), pp. 24–43.
- 'Irish, Scottish and Welsh Responses to Centralization, c.1530-c1640', in Uniting the Kingdom? The Enigma of British History, ed Alexander Grant and Keith Stringer (London, Routledge, 1995), pp. 147–69.
- 'Reviewing A View of the Present State of Ireland' in Irish University Review: Special Issue: Spenser in Ireland, 1596–1996 XXVI (1996), pp. 252–267.
- 'Revising the Revisionist', in Irish Historical Studies, XXX (1996), pp. 242–254 .
- 'Religion, Politics and the Irish Rising of 1641', in Religion and Rebellion: the Proceedings of the Twenty Second Irish Conference of Historians, ed. Judith Devlin and Ronan Fanning, (Dublin, 1997), pp. 40–70.
- 'Writing Atlantic History; or, Reconfiguiring the History of Colonial British America', in The Journal of American History, vol. 86 (1999), pp. 1093–1114.
- 'Atlantic History; what and why?', in European Review, vol. 9 (2001), pp. 399–411.
- ‘Atlantic History, 14921700: Scope, Sources and Methods’, in Atlantic History: History of the Atlantic System, 1580–1830 (Göttingen, 2002), pp. 55–64.
- ‘Asia, the Atlantic and the Subjects of the British Monarchy’, in A Companion to Stuart Britain, ed., Barry Coward (Oxford, Blackwell Publishing, 2003), pp. 45–66.
- ‘Taking Sides in Early Modern Ireland: the Case of Hugh O’Neill, earl of Tyrone’, in Taking Sides?: Colonial and Confessional Mentalitiés in Early Modern Ireland; Essays in Honour of Karl S. Bottigheimer, ed., Vincent Carey and Ute Lotz-Heumann (Dublin, 2003), pp. 94–115.
- ‘Writing Early Modern History: Ireland, Britain and the Wider World’, in The Historical Journal, vol. 46 (2003), pp. 723–747.
