= David E. Barclay =

American historian

David E. Barclay (born July 12, 1948) is an American historian and the author of several books on German history. He received his Ph.D. in history from Stanford University in 1975, where he studied under Gordon A. Craig. He taught at Kalamazoo College from 1974 to 2016, and served as the Executive Director of the German Studies Association for over a decade.

Barclay was named a 2006-07 Berlin Prize Winner by the American Academy in Berlin.

== Works ==
- Rudolf Wissell als Sozialpolitiker 1890–1933. Einzelveröffentlichungen der Historischen Kommission zu Berlin, vol. 44. Berlin: Colloquium Verlag, 1984.
- Frederick William IV and the Prussian Monarchy 1840–1861. Oxford: Oxford University Press, 1995.
- Transatlantic Images and Perceptions: Germany and America since 1776. Co-edited with Elsabeth Glaser-Schmidt. Cambridge University Press, 1997.
- Between Reform and Revolution: German Socialism and Communism from 1840 to 1990. Co-edited with Eric D. Weitz. Berghahn Books, 1998.
- Schaut auf diese Stadt. Der unbekannte Ernst Reuter. Translated by Ilse Utz. Berlin: Siedler Verlag, 2000.
- Cold War City: A History of West Berlin. Princeton University Press, 2026.
