= Suzanne L. Marchand =

American historian

Suzanne L. Marchand (born 1961) is an American intellectual and cultural historian of modern Europe. She is the Boyd Professor of European Intellectual History at Louisiana State University.

== Life ==
Suzanne Marchand is a second-generation historian, the daughter of Roland Marchand, a historian of American business at University of California, Davis. After earning a B.A. at University of California, Berkeley, Marchand moved to the University of Chicago, where she received her M.A. and Ph.D. degrees. She then proceeded to Princeton University, as assistant and later associate professor. Having transitioned to Louisiana State University, she served as associate and full professor before becoming Boyd Professor, the highest rank within the LSU system. She also loves porcelain, the subject of her third book.

== Professional activities ==
Marchand has been a member of numerous boards and committees. Previously, she sat on the editorial boards of Central European History and Journal of Modern History as well as the executive boards of the German Studies Association, Central European History, and Friends of the German Historical Institute, Washington, DC, among others. Currently, she serves on the editorial boards of Modern Intellectual History, Journal for Art Historiography, German History, Anabases: Traditions et réceptions de l'antiquité, and Palgrave Studies in Cultural and Intellectual History. She has also performed duties for the Mellon Foundation, Fulbright Program, Nieman Foundation for Journalism at Harvard University, the Shannon Prize of Notre Dame University, Consortium on the Revolutionary Era, American Historical Association, and American Council of Learned Societies. She has also acted as vice-president and president of the German Studies Association and is Consulting Editor of the Journal of the History of Ideas.

== Honors and awards ==
In the course of her career, Marchand has received grants and fellowships from the Humboldt Foundation, American Council of Learned Societies (Frederick Burkhardt Residential Fellowship), and Louisiana Board of Regents. She has been fellow at the Wissenschaftskolleg in Berlin (2000–01), Collegium Budapest (Institute for Advanced Study) in Budapest (2009), and Max Planck Institut für Wissenschaftsgechichte in Berlin (2013). In 2010, Marchand received the American Historical Association's George L. Mosse Prize for the Best Book in Cultural and Intellectual History for German Orientalism in the Age of Empire: Religion, Race, and Scholarship, which was published in the "Publications of the German Historical Institute" series. In 2022, she was honoured with the prestigious Guggenheim Fellowship in recognition of her scholarship in the field of German cultural and intellectual history.

== Selected publications ==
- Down from Olympus: Archaeology and Philhellenism in Germany, 1750-1970. Princeton University Press. 1996. ISBN 0-691-04393-0.
- German Orientalism in the Age of Empire: Race, Religion, and Scholarship. Cambridge University Press. 2009. ISBN 9780521518499.
- Porcelain: a History from the Heart of Europe. Princeton University Press. 2020. ISBN 9780691182339.
