= Nikolai Epplée =

Russian philologist, translator and writer (born 1977)

- Николай Владимирович Эппле
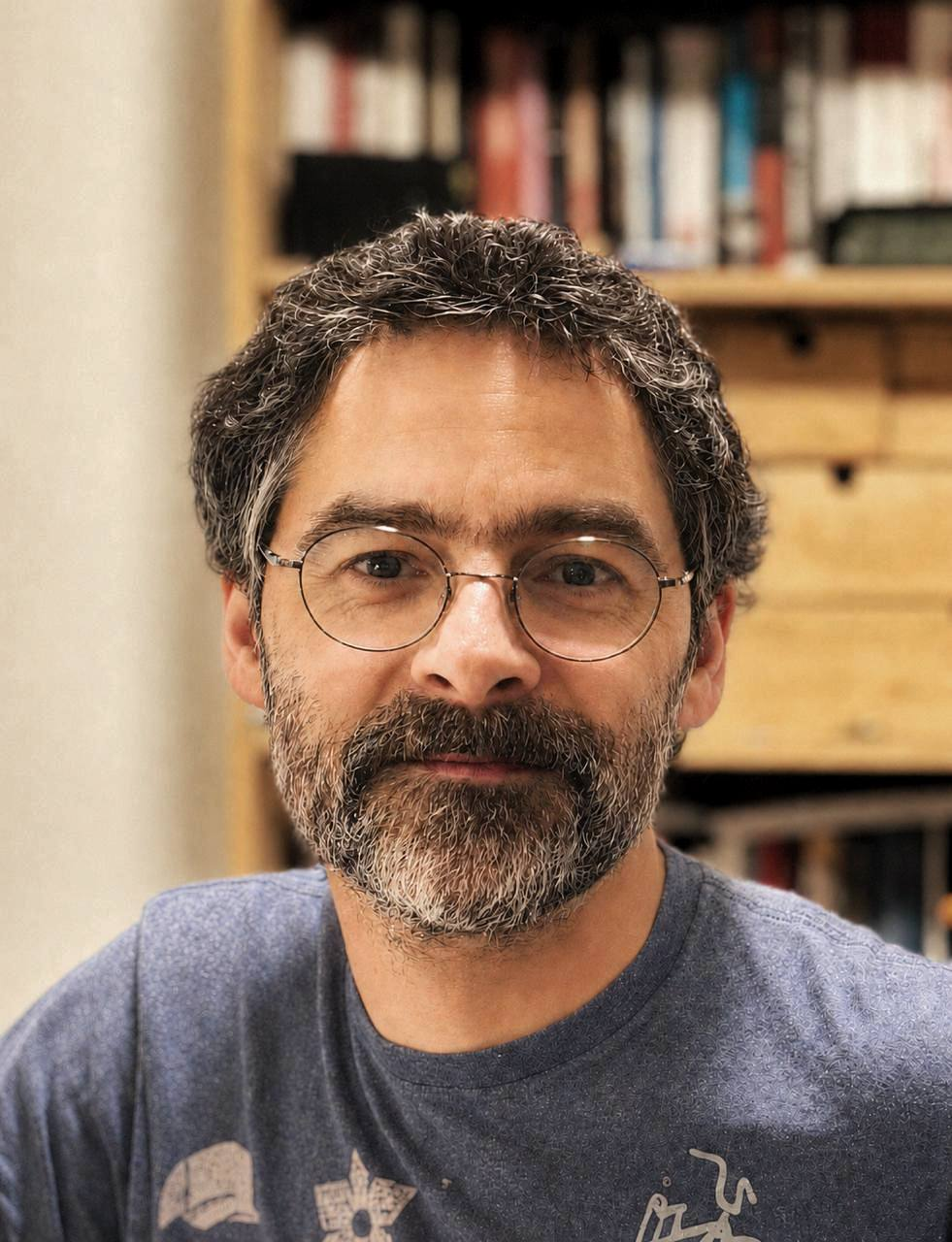
- Epplée in Amsterdam in January 2025
- Born: March 31, 1977 (age 49); Moscow, USSR
- Education: Russian State University for the Humanities; Institute of Philosophy, Russian Academy of Sciences
- Occupations: philologist; translator; writer; journalist
- Notable work: An Inconvenient Past
- Awards: Enlightener Prize (2021); LibMission Prize (2021)

Nikolai Vladimirovich Epplée (Russian: Николай Владимирович Эппле; born 31 March 1977) is a Russian philologist, translator and writer whose work focuses on historical memory. His name also appears in English-language sources as Nikolai Epple and Nikolay Epplee.

His 2020 book An Inconvenient Past (Russian: Неудобное прошлое, romanized: Neudobnoye proshloye), a comparative study of how societies address the memory of state crimes, won the 2021 Enlightener Prize in the humanities and the 2021 LibMission Prize in the "Analytics" category. A German translation was published by Suhrkamp in 2023.

== Early life and education ==
Epplée was born on 31 March 1977 in Moscow. His father, Vladimir Nikolayevich Epple, directed a research institute for the peat industry. Epplée was born during his father's second marriage; actress and television presenter Zhanna Epple, Vladimir's daughter from his first marriage, is his older paternal half-sister.

On his father's side, Epplée comes from a family of Moscow Germans. He was named after his grandfather Nikolai Arturovich Epple (1903–1944), whose work combined psychology and engineering. In September 1941, Nikolai Arturovich and his brother, the book illustrator Lev Epple, were deported with their families to Kazakhstan as ethnic Germans. In 1942, the brothers were sent to different divisions of Sevurallag; Lev survived, while Nikolai Arturovich died there in 1944 under unclear circumstances.

Epplée studied in the classics department of the Faculty of History and Philology at the Russian State University for the Humanities. He later undertook postgraduate study at the Institute of Philosophy, Russian Academy of Sciences.

== Career ==
Epplée lectured on ancient Greek philosophy at the State Academic University for the Humanities and on classical and medieval literature at St Thomas Institute in Moscow. He also taught at the Faculty of Political Science of the Moscow School for the Social and Economic Sciences, commonly known as Shaninka.

He has translated works from Greek, Latin, English, German and Italian. His translations include three scholarly books by C. S. Lewis—The Allegory of Love, A Preface to Paradise Lost and The Discarded Image—published together in Russian as Selected Works on the History of Culture (Russian: Избранные работы по истории культуры, romanized: Izbrannye raboty po istorii kultury; 2016). His other translations include the 2021 Russian edition of Marianne Hirsch's The Generation of Postmemory: Writing and Visual Culture After the Holocaust (Russian: Поколение постпамяти: Письмо и визуальная культура после Холокоста, romanized: Pokolenie postpamyati: Pismo i vizualnaya kultura posle Kholokosta). In a 2025 article, Alexey Pavlovsky described the translation as a further contribution by Epplée to the development of memory studies in Russia and generally praised its execution, while questioning some terminological choices. From 2013 to 2017, Epplée was an editorial writer at the Russian business newspaper Vedomosti.

Epplée has researched C. S. Lewis and the Inklings as well as translating C. S. Lewis's works. He prepared Tolkien's World (Russian: Мир Толкина, romanized: Mir Tolkina), a lecture course on the life and legendarium of J. R. R. Tolkien.

Epplée's research and public writing examine how societies remember past state crimes, including Soviet state terror. In 2020, he and other relatives took part in The Epplee Brothers (Russian: Братья Эппле, romanized: Bratya Epple), an animated documentary about the family's memories of his grandfather and great-uncle; the film was included in the programme of the 2022 Artdocfest documentary film festival.

Epplée is a relative of the German conductor and arranger of piano reductions Eugen Epplée (1929–2016).

== Books and reception ==
=== An Inconvenient Past ===
In 2020, New Literary Observer first published Epplée's An Inconvenient Past: Memory of State Crimes in Russia and Other Countries (Russian: Неудобное прошлое. Память о государственных преступлениях в России и других странах, romanized: Neudobnoye proshloye. Pamyat o gosudarstvennykh prestupleniyakh v Rossii i drugikh stranakh). The book examines the remembrance of Soviet state violence in Russia, compares efforts to confront state crimes in Argentina, Spain, South Africa, Poland, Germany and Japan, and concludes by considering possible approaches to Russia's own "difficult past". The book reached a fifth Russian edition in 2024.

The book won the 2021 Enlightener Prize in the humanities. It also received the 2021 LibMission Prize in the "Analytics" category.

The book received scholarly attention in Slavic Review, where historian Ivan Kurilla reviewed it in 2022. In a 2023 survey of Russian memory studies, Aleksandr Fokin and Dmitry Kozlov credited its comparative scope with moving beyond a simple Germany–Russia binary, while questioning "state crime" as an analytical category and arguing that its categorical assessment of the Soviet system could hinder the broad social dialogue advocated in the book.

A German translation by Anselm Bühling, titled Die unbequeme Vergangenheit: Vom Umgang mit Staatsverbrechen in Russland und anderswo, was published by Suhrkamp in June 2023. In December 2023, the political-book editors of Süddeutsche Zeitung ranked it third in their selection of the year's political books.

=== Fairyland and Its Surroundings ===
In 2024, Epplée published Fairyland and Its Surroundings (Russian: Волшебная страна и её окрестности, romanized: Volshebnaya strana i yeyo okrestnosti), a collection of essays on writers associated with the English-language fantasy tradition from the nineteenth through the twenty-first centuries. Epplée presents authors ranging from George MacDonald and Lewis Carroll to Tolkien and J. K. Rowling as part of a connected tradition of "Fairyland literature".

== Public positions and legal status ==
Following the Russian invasion of Ukraine, Epplée publicly opposed the war. He left Russia in 2022 and settled in the Netherlands. In a May 2023 interview with Le Figaro, he described the war as "a direct result of Russia's refusal to reckon with its criminal past". In a July 2024 interview with Die Zeit, he similarly argued that the invasion was partly a consequence of Russia's failure to address Soviet state crimes and described the country's leadership as trapped by its own past.

On 11 April 2025, the Russian Ministry of Justice added Epplée to its register of "foreign agents".

== Awards ==
- 2021 – Enlightener Prize, in the Humanities category and in the prize's popular vote, for An Inconvenient Past.
- 2021 – LibMission Prize, in the "Analytics" category, for An Inconvenient Past.

== Selected works ==
=== Books ===
- Epplée, Nikolai (2020). Neudobnoye proshloye. Pamyat o gosudarstvennykh prestupleniyakh v Rossii i drugikh stranakh Неудобное прошлое. Память о государственных преступлениях в России и других странах [An Inconvenient Past: Memory of State Crimes in Russia and Other Countries] (in Russian). Moscow: New Literary Observer.
  - German translation: Epplée, Nikolai (2023). Die unbequeme Vergangenheit: Vom Umgang mit Staatsverbrechen in Russland und anderswo [An Inconvenient Past: Dealing with State Crimes in Russia and Elsewhere] (in German). Translated by Bühling, Anselm. Berlin: Suhrkamp. ISBN 978-3-518-43105-4.
- Epplée, Nikolai (2024). Volshebnaya strana i yeyo okrestnosti Волшебная страна и её окрестности [Fairyland and Its Surroundings] (in Russian). Moscow: Illuminator. ISBN 978-5-907488-18-2.

=== Book chapters ===
- Epplée, Nikolay (2013). "The Center and the Rim: Inversions of the System of the Heavens in Perelandra and The Discarded Image". In Wolfe, Judith; Wolfe, Brendan (eds.). C. S. Lewis's Perelandra: Reshaping the Image of the Cosmos. Kent, Ohio: Kent State University Press. pp. 83–98. ISBN 978-1-60635-183-3.

=== Translations ===
- Lewis, C. S. (2016). Izbrannye raboty po istorii kultury Избранные работы по истории культуры [Selected Works on the History of Culture] (in Russian). Translated by Epplée, Nikolai. Moscow: New Literary Observer.
- Hirsch, Marianne (2021). Pokolenie postpamyati: Pismo i vizualnaya kultura posle Kholokosta Поколение постпамяти: Письмо и визуальная культура после Холокоста [The Generation of Postmemory: Writing and Visual Culture After the Holocaust] (in Russian). Translated by Epplée, Nikolai. Moscow: Novoye izdatelstvo. ISBN 978-5-98379-251-7.
