= Tübingen University Faculty of Modern Languages =

Faculty at the University of Tübingen

Coordinates: 48.527°N 9.063°E

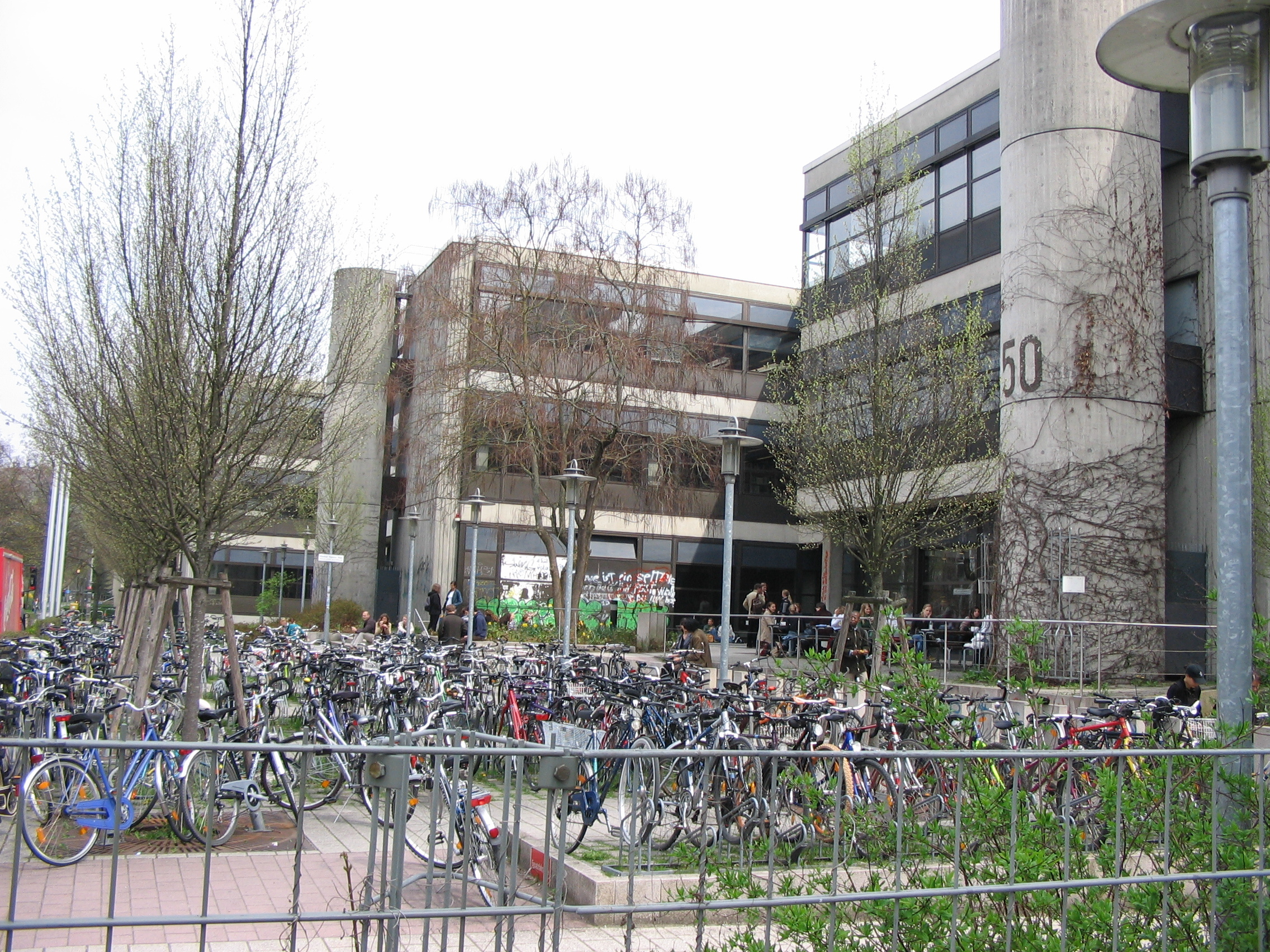
Brechtbau in April 2005

The Faculty of Modern Languages (German: Neuphilologische Fakultät) was one of fourteen faculties at the University of Tübingen. It was dissolved in 2010 in the course of the administrative reform, where the number of faculties was reduced from fourteen to seven. The faculty merged with the former Faculty of Philosophy and History and the former Faculty of Cultural Anthropology into the new Faculty of Humanities (German: Philosophische Fakultät).

The Faculty of Modern Languages was the largest faculty of the university with about 8,000 students. It was located in the Neuphilologikum in the Wilhelmstraße area of the town. Most staff and students referred to both faculty and building by the building's unofficial name, Brechtbau, named after the German author and playwright Bertolt Brecht.

The building has its own lecture theatres for use by the faculty's departments as well as being equipped with a significant library containing over 300,000 volumes. Computer pools and wireless internet access allow students to conduct research online.

== Departments ==
The Faculty of Modern Languages consisted of the following schools and departments:

- German language and literature
  - Linguistics (Linguistik)
  - Neuere deutsche Literatur (16th century till today)
  - Medievalism
  - Comparative literature
  - Scandinavian studies
  - Media studies (Medienwissenschaft)
- English language and literature
  - American studies
- Romance languages and literatures
- Slavic languages and literatures
- General Rhetoric
- Linguistics (Sprachwissenschaft)
  - General linguistics / computer linguistics
  - General and theoretical linguistics
  - Theoretical computer linguistics

== See also ==
Heidelberg University Faculty of Modern Languages
