= Roland Marchand =

American historian

- Born: Charles Roland Marchand; 1933; Seattle, Washington, U.S.
- Died: November 14, 1997 (aged 64)

Academic background
- Education: Stanford University (BA, MA, PhD)

Academic work
- Discipline: American history
- Institutions: University of California, Davis

Charles Roland Marchand (1933 – November 14, 1997) was an American historian who taught at the University of California, Davis, where he co-founded the History Project.

== Early life and education ==
Marchand received a Bachelor of Arts in journalism summa cum laude from Stanford University in 1955, after which he served as an officer in the United States Navy for three years. He received his Master of Arts in 1961 and his PhD in 1964, also from Stanford.

== Career ==
In 1964, Marchand joined the faculty at the University of California, Davis, where he specialized in 20th-century American history. He continued to teach there until being hospitalized in 1997 shortly before his death. He also served as the co-director of the Area 3 History and Cultures Project.

Marchand was the author of three American history books: The American Peace Movement and Social Reform, 1898-1918, Advertising the American Dream: Making Way for Modernity, 1920-1940, and Creating the Corporate Soul: The Rise of Public Relations and Corporate Imagery in American Big Business. Advertising the American Dream has been called "a model of conceptual precision and scrupulous research" by Susan Strasser.

Marchand received the Distinguished Teaching Award from the University of California, Davis' academic senate.

== Personal life ==
Marchand is the father of the historian Suzanne Marchand. Marchand died on November 14, 1997, of pulmonary fibrosis.
