= Wayland D. Hand Prize =

Book award given by the American Folklore Society

The Wayland D. Hand Prize is an award given by the History and Folklore section of the American Folklore Society (AFS) for the best book combining historical and folkloristic methods and materials. The biennial prize honors the eminent folklorist Wayland D. Hand (1907-1986), a former president of the American Folklore Society (1955-1967) who in his teaching and scholarship encouraged historical methodology in folklore research.

The prize was established in 1991 by the journal The Folklore Historian, in association with the History and Folklore section of the American Folklore Society (which is devoted to historical approaches to the study of folklore and the history of folklore studies), and was originally awarded to the best essay published in The Folklore Historian. The first prize was presented in October 1992 and has since been awarded every other year (i.e. on even years) at the annual meeting of the American Folklore Society. In 2005, the prize was changed to be awarded to "an outstanding book-length publication that combines historical and folkloristic perspectives" and was first presented as a book prize in 2006. A work offered for consideration can be an authored book, edited volume, reference work, or exhibition catalog published in the previous two years (prior to the deadline of June 1). Occasionally the prize is shared between two winners and Honorable Mentions can also be listed.

Since 1990. the History and Folklore section of the American Folklore Society has also sponsored the Richard Reuss Prize for Students of Folklore and History, a biennial award (presented on odd-numbered years) honoring Richard Reuss (1940-1986), founding editor of The Folklore Historian and a leading chronicler of folklore studies.

The Israeli historian Guy Beiner is the only person to date to have won the Wayland D. Hand Prize twice: in 2008 for his book Remembering the Year of the French: Irish Folk History and Social Memory (University of Wisconsin Press) and in 2020 for his book Forgetful Remembrance: Social Forgetting and Vernacular Historiography of a Rebellion in Ulster (Oxford University Press), both titles also won a number of other prizes relating to history and folklore.

== Wayland D. Hand Prize winners ==
- 2023 Steve Siporin, The Befana Is Returning: The Story of a Tuscan Festival (University of Wisconsin Press, 2022).
- 2022 Tyler D. Parry, Jumping the Broom: The Surprising Multicultural Origins of a Black Wedding Ritual (University of North Carolina Press, 2020).
- 2020 Guy Beiner, Forgetful Remembrance: Social Forgetting and Vernacular Historiography of a Rebellion in Ulster (Oxford University Press, 2018). Honorable Mention: Daniel C. Swan, and Jim Cooley, Wedding Clothes and the Osage Community: A Giving Heritage (Indiana University Press. 2019).
- 2018 Margarita Marín-Dale, Decoding Andean Mythology (University of Utah Press, 2016) and Stacy I. Morgan, Frankie and Johnny: Race, Gender, and the Work of African American Folklore in 1930s America (University of Texas Press, 2017).
- 2016 Jane C. Beck, Daisy Turner's Kin: An African American Family Saga (University of Illinois Press). Honorable Mentions: Anthony Bak Buccitelli, City of Neighborhoods: Memory, Folklore, and Ethnic Place in Boston (University of Wisconsin Press), James P. Leary, Folksongs of Another America: Field Recordings from the Upper Midwest, 1937-1946 (University of Wisconsin Press and Dust-to-Digital), and John Laudun The Amazing Crawfish Boat (University Press of Mississippi).
- 2014 Ann K. Ferrell, Burley: Kentucky Tobacco in a New Century (University Press of Kentucky).
- 2012 Jack Zipes, The Irresistible Fairy Tale: The Cultural and Social History of a Genre (Princeton University Press) and Rachelle H. Saltzman, A Lark for the Sake of Their Country: The 1926 General Strike Volunteers in Folklore and Memory (Manchester University Press).
- 2010 Michael Edmonds. Out of the Northwoods: The Many Lives of Paul Bunyan (Wisconsin Historical Society Press) and Patrick Huber, Linthead Stomp: The Creation of Country Music in the Piedmont South (University of North Carolina Press).
- 2008 Guy Beiner, Remembering the Year of the French: Irish Folk History and Social Memory (University of Wisconsin Press). Honorable Mention: Simon J. Bronner (ed.) The Meaning of Folklore: The Analytical Essays of Alan Dundes (Utah State University Press).
- 2006 Wolfgang Mieder, Proverbs are the Best Policy: Folk Wisdom and American Politics (Utah State University Press). Honorable mention: David Stanley (ed.), Folklore in Utah: A History and Guide to Resources (Utah State University Press).
