= Acta Germanica =

- Discipline: German studies
- Language: English, German

Publication details
- History: 1966-present, online since 2000
- Publisher: Peter Lang Publishing Group on behalf of Germanistenverband im Südlichen Afrika (South Africa)
- Frequency: Annual

Standard abbreviations
- ISO 4: Acta Ger.

Indexing
- ISSN: 0065-1273

Links
- Journal homepage

Acta Germanica is a scholarly yearbook edited by the Association for German Studies in Southern Africa (SAGV, German: Germanistenverband im Südlichen Afrika). It publishes articles and book reviews in the fields of German language and literature, the teaching of German as a second language, and comparative studies in the relation of Germany to Africa. The yearbook accepts contributions in both German and English.

The journal was founded by Karl Tober in 1966, and is issued on an annual basis.

The print edition is published by the Peter Lang Publishing Group. Full text issues since 2000 are available online. Online access is free to authors and SAGV members. Subscription information for libraries is available at the SAGV website and the online edition home page.
