= Sybil Milton =

American historian

Sybil Halpern Milton
- Born: October 6, 1941
- Died: October 16, 2000 (aged 59)
- Occupation: Historian

Sybil Halpern Milton (October 6, 1941 – October 16, 2000) was an American historian. She specialized in the study of the Holocaust. She was the senior resident historian at the United States Holocaust Memorial Museum from 1989 to 1997.

== Early life and education ==
Milton was born in New York City in 1941. Her parents were Austrian Jewish refugees who fled Austria after the Nazi takeover.

She graduated from the High School of Music and Art. In 1962, she received a BA from Barnard College, a MA in 1963, and a doctorate from Stanford University in modern German history in 1971.

== Career ==
Milton taught German history at Stanford University and other institutions. From 1974 to 1984, she was the director of archives at the Leo Baeck Institute in New York. She then became a consultant to the Holocaust Memorial Council.

Milton was vice president of the Independent Commission of Experts, which examined Swiss policies toward the Nazis and Jews during the Holocaust. Milton herself studied the relationship between Swiss banks and Jewish assets held by the Nazis such as artworks and precious metals.

According to Menachem Z. Rosensaft, of the executive committee of the United States Holocaust Memorial Council, she was “a pioneer in studying the memorials and archives of the Nazi death camps throughout Europe.”

== Personal life, illness and death ==
Milton was married to historian Henry Friedlander.

Milton died of non-Hodgkin's lymphoma at age 59, on October 16, 2000, at the National Institutes of Health in Bethesda, Maryland.

== Awards and honors ==
Milton's 1981 book Art of the Holocaust won the National Jewish Book Award in Visual Arts.

The German Studies Association created the Sybil Halpern Milton Memorial Book Prize after Milton’s death. The prize of $1,000 is awarded in odd numbered years to the author of the best book on Nazi Germany and the Holocaust in any academic field.

== Books ==
- with Janet Blatter: Art of the Holocaust (Book Club Associates, 1982)
- The Art of Jewish children, Germany, 1936–1941: innocence and persecution (Philosophical Library, 1989)
