= German Studies Association =

- Formation: 1976
- Headquarters: Baltimore, Maryland
- President: Damani Partridge, University of Michigan
- Website: https://www.thegsa.org/

The German Studies Association (GSA) is an international organization of scholars in history, literature, economics, cultural studies, and political science who study Germany, Austria, and Switzerland. The organization began in 1976 as the Western Association for German Studies, and was renamed as the GSA in 1983 after transforming itself into first a North American organization, and then an international one. The association awards several annual awards for books in German and Central European history: the David Barclay Book Prize, the DAAD/GSA Book Prize, the Radomír Luža Prize, and the Sybil Halpern Milton Memorial Book Prize, as well as the GSA-De Gruyter Dissertation Prize.

== History ==
The founder and long-time executive director of the GSA was Professor Gerald R. Kleinfeld of Arizona State University. He also served as the first editor of the association's scholarly journal, the German Studies Review, which was first published in 1978. The executive director's position is currently held by Professor Margaret Menninger of Texas State, while the German Studies Review is edited by Professor Sabine Hake of the University of Texas, Austin. The association is governed by a Board elected by the members in accordance with the GSA by-laws. The GSA holds an annual conference each autumn in a North American location.

== Presidents ==
Presidents of the association have included:

- Ronald Smelser (1989–90)
- Gerhard Weinberg (1997–98)
- Henry Friedlander (2001–2002)
- Patricia Herminghouse, University of Rochester (2003-2004)
- Katherine Roper, St. Mary's College of California (2005-2006)
- Sara Lennox, University of Massachusetts Amherst (2007-2008)
- Celia Applegate, University of Rochester (2009-2010)
- Stephen Brockmann, Carnegie Mellon University (2011-2012)
- Suzanne L. Marchand (2013–2014)
- David E. Barclay

== See also ==
- German Historical Institute
- German studies
- German literature
- Germanisches Nationalmuseum
- Area studies
