= Sandra Herbert =

American historian

Sandra Herbert née Swanson (born April 10, 1942 in Chicago) is an American historian of science with an international reputation as an expert on Charles Darwin. The Geological Society of London awarded her the 2020 Sue Tyler Friedman Medal.

== Biography ==
Sandra Lynn Swanson's father was an accountant and both her grandfathers worked at Chicago steel mills. She graduated in 1963 with a B.A. in Interdisciplinary Studied from Wittenberg University. At Brandeis University, she graduated in the History of Ideas with an M.A. in 1965 and a Ph.D. in 1968. Her Ph.D. thesis is entitled The Logic of Darwin's Discovery. In 1966 she married James Charles Herbert (born 1941), who received his Ph.D. in 1970 from Brandeis University and became an education executive. Sandra and James Herbert have two daughters. She became a professor of history at the University of Maryland, Baltimore County and retired in 2009 as professor emerita.

Sandra Herbert was from 2007 to 2008 a Distinguished Visiting Scholar at Christ's College, Cambridge. From February 2012 to February 2013 she was a visiting scholar at the University of California, Berkeley.

Her 2005 book Charles Darwin, Geologist has become the basic reference for Darwin's research on geology. In 2006 the book won the Geological Society of America's Mary C. Rabbitt History of Geology Award, the History of Science Society's Suzanne J. Levinson Prize, the American Historical Association's George L. Mosse Prize, and the Albion Book Prize from the North American Conference on British Studies.

In 2007 Sandra Herbert organized and led an expedition to the Galápagos Islands. There she and her colleagues in July 2007 on Isla Santiago located igneous rocks similar to the samples collected by Darwin. Thereby they gained a better understanding of how Darwin's field observations in geology are related to his research published in Geological Observations on the Volcanic Islands (1844).

She was a Guggenheim Fellow for the academic year 1982–1983. In 2006 she was elected a Fellow of the American Association for the Advancement of Science. She is also a Fellow of the Geological Society of America.

== Selected publications ==
=== Articles ===
- Herbert, Sandra (1971). "Darwin, Malthus, and Selection". Journal of the History of Biology. 4 (1): 209–217. doi:10.1007/BF00356983. JSTOR 4330556. PMID 11609436. S2CID 38075809.
- —— (1974). "The place of man in the development of Darwin's theory of transmutation". Journal of the History of Biology. 7 (2): 217–258. doi:10.1007/BF00351204. PMID 11609300. S2CID 27605743.
- —— (1977). "The place of man in the development of Darwin's theory of transmutation. Part II". Journal of the History of Biology. 10 (2): 155–227. doi:10.1007/BF00572643. PMID 11615664. S2CID 45493836.
- —— (1986). "Darwin as a Geologist". Scientific American. 254 (5): 116–123. Bibcode:1986SciAm.254e.116H. doi:10.1038/scientificamerican0586-116. JSTOR 24975958.
- —— (1991). "Charles Darwin as a prospective geological author". The British Journal for the History of Science. 24 (2): 159–192. doi:10.1017/S0007087400027060. S2CID 143748414.
- —— (1995). "From Charles Darwin's Portfolio: An Early Essay on South American Geology and Species". Earth Sciences History. 14 (1): 23–36. Bibcode:1995ESHis..14...23H. doi:10.17704/eshi.14.1.76570264u727jh36. JSTOR 24137195.
- —— (2005). "The Darwinian Revolution Revisited". Journal of the History of Biology. 38 (1): 51–66. doi:10.1007/s10739-004-6509-y. PMID 25214416. S2CID 43064176.
- —— (2007). "Doing and knowing: Charles Darwin and other travellers". Geological Society, London, Special Publications. 287 (1): 311–323. Bibcode:2007GSLSP.287..311H. doi:10.1144/SP287.24. S2CID 146521336.
- —— (2015). "Creation and extinction: The geological background to the initial American reception of Charles Darwin's Origin of Species". Earth Sciences History. 34 (2): 243–262. Bibcode:2015ESHis..34..243H. doi:10.17704/1944-6178-34-2-243.

=== Books ===
- Herbert, Sandra, ed. (1980). The Red Notebook of Charles Darwin. London: British Museum (Natural History). ISBN 9780801412264. (published in the U.S.A. by Cornell University Press; online text from darwin-online.org)
- Barrett, Paul; Gautrey, Peter J.; Herbert, Sandra; Kohn, David; Smith, Sydney, eds. (19 March 2009). Charles Darwin's Notebooks, 1836-1844: Geology, Transmutation of Species, Metaphysical Enquiries. Cambridge University Press. ISBN 9780521099752. (1st edition 1987, published in London by British Museum (Natural History) and in Ithaca, N.Y. by Cornell University Press)
- Herbert, Sandra (2005). Charles Darwin, Geologist. Cornell University Press. ISBN 9780801443480.
- Herbert, Sandra (28 January 2011). Charles Darwin and the Question of Evolution: A Brief History with Documents. Macmillan Higher Education. ISBN 9781319242671.
