= Germanistik in Ireland =

Germanistik in Ireland is an annual peer-reviewed academic journal established in 2006 by Florian Krobb and Hans-Walter Schmidt-Hannisa. It is the official publication of the German Studies Association of Ireland and covers all areas of German studies, including literary and cultural studies, the history of the German-speaking countries, applied and theoretical linguistics, and German as a foreign language. The journal also publishes book reviews and conference reports. The official languages of the publication are German, English, and Irish. The current editors-in-chief are Jürgen Barkhoff and Siobhán Donovan. The journal is indexed in the MLA International Bibliography.

== Advisory board ==
The advisory board consists of former editors of the journal as well as scholars from the wider community of Germanists whose specialisms span the broad spectrum of thematic areas within modern German Studies. Former editors of the peer-reviewed academic journal include Florian Krobb, Hans-Walter Schmidt Hanissa, Rachel MagShamhráin, Sabine Strümper-Krobb, Gillian Pye, and Christiane Schönfeld.
