= German Politics and Society =

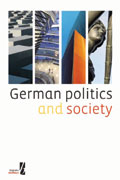
- Discipline: Political science
- Language: English
- Edited by: Jeffrey J. Anderson

Publication details
- Publisher: Berghahn Journals
- Frequency: Quarterly

Standard abbreviations
- ISO 4: Ger. Politics Soc.

Indexing
- ISSN: 1045-0300 (print); 1558-5441 (web)

Links
- Journal homepage

German Politics and Society (GP&S) is a peer-reviewed academic journal published by Berghahn edited by Jeffrey J. Anderson. It explores issues in contemporary Germany from the conjoined perspectives of the social sciences, history, and cultural studies, and provides a forum for critical analysis and debate about politics, history, film, literature, visual arts, and popular culture. Every issue presents contributions by scholars commenting on recent books about Germany.

== Indexing ==
German Politics & Society is indexed/abstracted in:

- Academic Search Premier
- America: History and Life
- American Bibliography of Slavic and East European Studies
- British Humanities Index
- Columbia International Affairs Online
- Current Abstracts
- Educational Resources Information Center
- Historical Abstracts
- Infotrac Online
- International Biblio of Periodical Literature
- International Bibliography of Book Reviews of Scholarly Literature on the Humanities and Social Sciences
- International Bibliography of Periodicals
- International Political Science Abstracts
- MLA International Bibliography
- SocIndex
- Sociological Abstracts
- Worldwide Political Science Abstracts
