= German Studies Review =

- Discipline: German studies
- Language: English

Publication details
- History: 1978–present
- Publisher: German Studies Association (United States)
- Frequency: Triannual
- Impact factor: 0.413 (2016)

Standard abbreviations
- ISO 4: Ger. Stud. Rev.

Indexing
- ISSN: 0149-7952
- LCCN: 2005-237244
- JSTOR: 01497952
- OCLC no.: 61523181

Links
- Journal homepage

German Studies Review is a triannual peer-reviewed academic journal affiliated with the German Studies Association and published by Johns Hopkins University Press. It was established in 1978 and publishes articles on the history, literature, language, culture and politics of German-speaking Europe. Its current editor-in-chief is Tanvi Solanki (Underwood International College,Yonsei University).

According to the Journal Citation Reports, the journal has a 2016 impact factor of 0.413.
