= Yuri Slezkine =

Russian-born American historian and translator

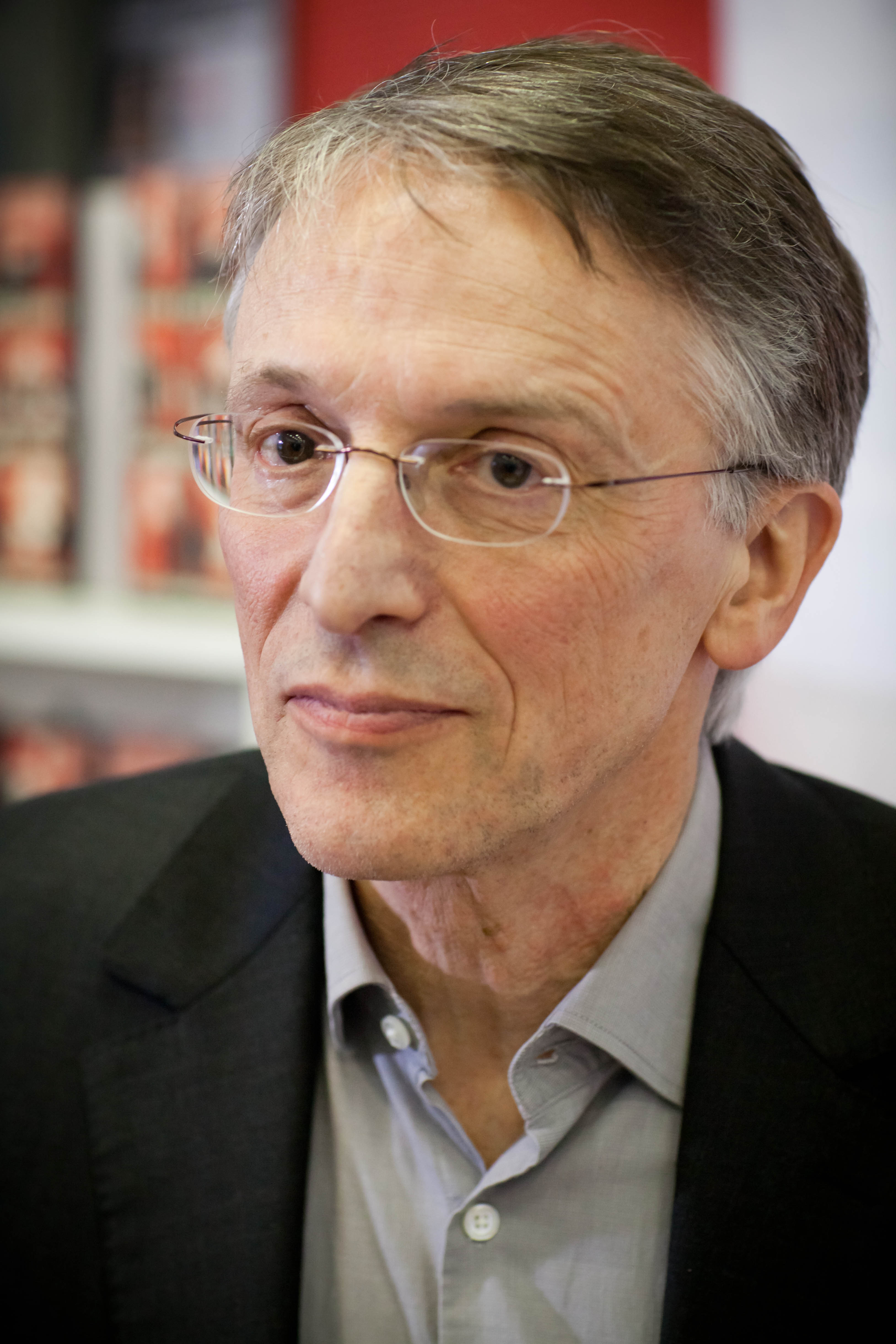
- Slezkine in 2019.
- Born: Yuri Lvovich Slezkine; February 7, 1956 (age 70); Russia
- Education: Moscow State University; University of Texas, Austin
- Occupations: Historian, translator
- Employer: University of California, Berkeley

Yuri Lvovich Slezkine (Russian: Ю́рий Льво́вич Слёзкин Yúriy L'vóvich Slyózkin; born February 7, 1956) is a Russian-born American historian and translator.

He was a professor of Russian history, Sovietologist, and served as Director of the Institute of Slavic, East European, and Eurasian Studies at the University of California, Berkeley in 2004-2013.

He is best known as the author of the books The Jewish Century (2004) and The House of Government: A Saga of The Russian Revolution (2017).

== Life and career ==
Slezkine was born into a family which "considered itself a part of the Russian intelligentsia". He was raised in a secular household, and only became aware of his maternal Jewish descent at the age of 11. His maternal grandparents emigrated to Argentina from the Pale of Settlement before moving back to Russia in 1931, inspired by their socialist convictions. Their daughter, Slezkine's mother, was a violin teacher. Paternally, Slezkine is descended from a noble family with a tradition of service to the Russian Empire; his paternal grandfather, also named Yuri Slezkine, was a novelist and friend of Mikhail Bulgakov, and his father, Lev Slezkine was a historian of the Americas.

Slezkine studied medieval Russian literature at Moscow State University, but took up Portuguese in his senior year in response to the end of the Portuguese Colonial War. His first trip outside the Soviet Union was in 1978-1979, when he worked as a translator in Beira, Mozambique. He returned to Moscow to serve as a translator of Portuguese and moved to Lisbon in 1982 before entering graduate school in Austin, Texas, the following year. He earned a PhD in history from the University of Texas at Austin. At Austin, he was taught by Sheila Fitzpatrick.

Slezkine was a W. Glenn Campbell and Rita Ricardo-Campbell National Fellow at Stanford University's Hoover Institution and Jane K. Sather Professor of History at the University of California, Berkeley. He is also a member of the American Academy of Arts and Sciences (2008).

Slezkine met his wife, a scholar of Russian, at Austin. As of 2025, Slezkine lived in a dacha in Latvia, and visited Russia at least once a year.

== Slezkine's theory of ethnic identity ==
Slezkine characterizes the Jews (alongside other groups such as the Armenians and Overseas Chinese) as a Mercurian people "specializ[ing] exclusively in providing services to the surrounding food-producing societies," which he characterizes as "Apollonians". This division is, according to him, recurring in pre-20th century societies. With the exception of the Romani, these "Mercurian peoples" have all enjoyed great socioeconomic success relative to the average among their hosts, and have all, without exception, attracted hostility and resentment. A recurring pattern of the relationship between Apollonians and Mercurian people is that the social representation of each group by the other is symmetrical, for instance Mercurians see Apollonians as brutes while Apollonians see Mercurians as effeminate. Mercurians develop a culture of "purity" and "national myths" to cultivate their separation from the Apollonians, which allows them to provide international services (intermediaries, diplomacy) or services that are taboo for the local Apollonian culture (linked to death, magic, sexuality or banking). Slezkine develops this thesis by arguing that the Jews, the most successful of these Mercurian peoples, have increasingly influenced the course and nature of Western societies, particularly during the early and middle periods of Soviet Communism, and that modernity can be seen as a transformation of Apollonians into Mercurians.

== Views on the Russo-Ukrainian War and Western Civilization ==
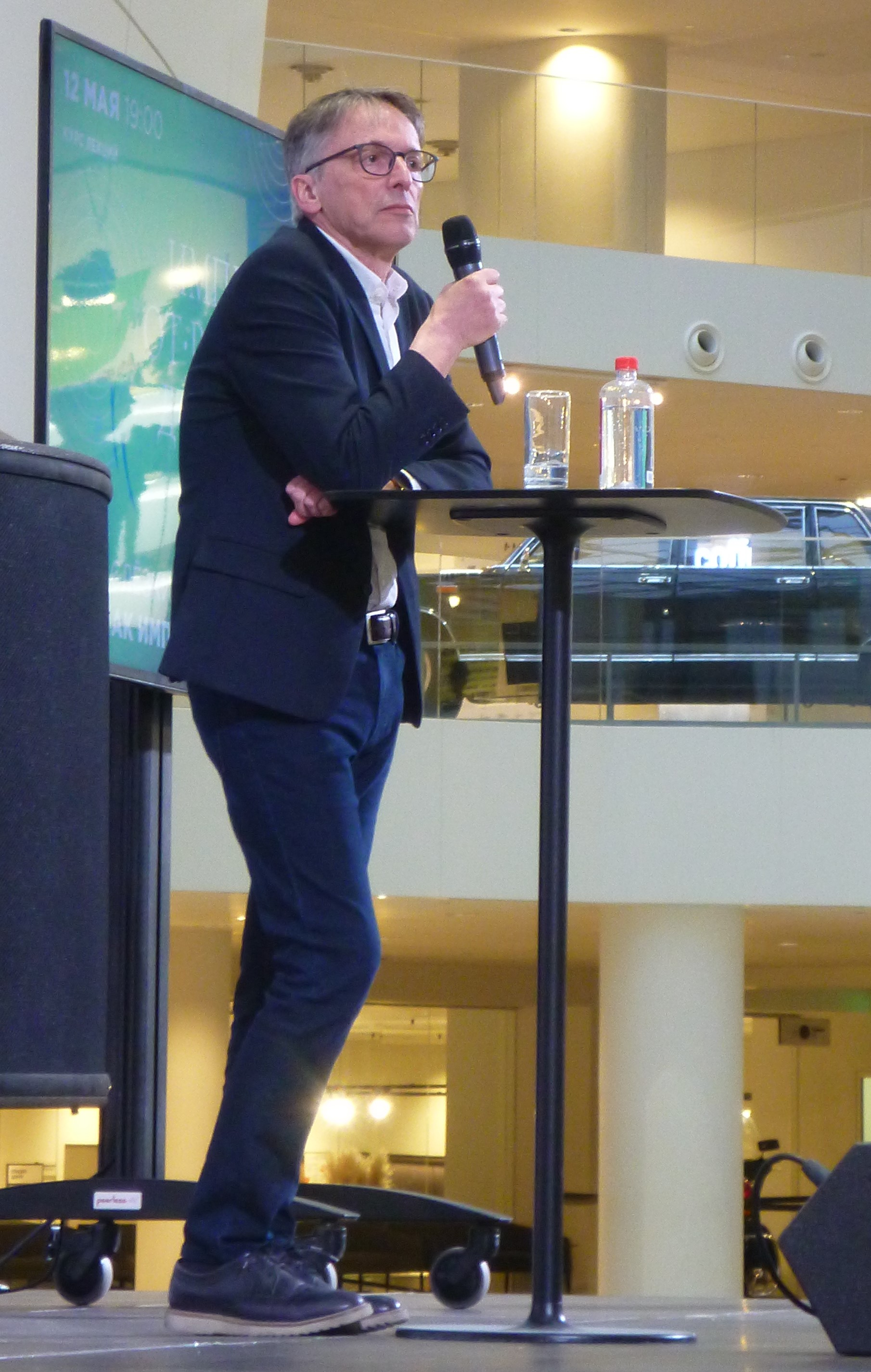
Slezkine giving a lecture at the Boris Yeltsin Presidential Center in Yekaterinburg, Russia, in 2023

According to Slezkine, Russia is divorcing itself from the rest of Western civilization, a process reinforced by the Russo-Ukrainian War. He further argues that the West's unwillingness to integrate Russia into a common European security infrastructure was a major factor in provoking the war.

In October 2022, he argued that the West maintains unity in part by characterizing Russia as "evil," remarking "where would the West be without it?" He also alluded to the supposedly controversial ideas in Ukraine which do not sit well with the Western views: "Ukrainian national ideology is in many ways the opposite of what we are taught in the United States or in Western Europe".

More broadly, he believes that Western civilization is divided between Anglo-American/Western European cosmopolitanism and Eastern European/Israeli ethnonationalism. He has described the Baltic states as “ethnocracies” and Israel as “a racist state”, which, for just or unjust reasons, implemented an apartheid system with first-, second- and third-class citizens. Slezkine himself has many relatives in Israel; his aunt’s kibbutz was attacked in the October 7 attacks, but she survived.

He argues that censorship in the West is very substantial. It originates from private and professional organizations and creates a “society of conformists”. Among the West’s “sacred cows” are matters related to family, sexuality, and race.

== Works ==
- Yuri Slezkine, "Why 'The West'?" (review of Georgios Varouxakis, The West: The History of an Idea, Princeton University Press, 2025, 491 pp.), The New York Review of Books, vol. LXXII, no.20 (18 December 2025), pp. 52-53, 57-58. "'The West' owes its existence to Russia." (p. 52.)
- The House of Government: A Saga of the Russian Revolution, Princeton University Press, 2017
- The Jewish Century, Princeton University Press, 2004 (ISBN 0-691-11995-3)
- In the Shadow of the Revolution: Life Stories of Russian Women from 1917 to the Second World War, edited by Sheila Fitzpatrick and Yuri Slezkine, Princeton University Press, 2000
- Arctic Mirrors: Russia and the Small Peoples of the North, Cornell University Press, 1994
- "The USSR as a Communal Apartment, or How a Socialist State Promoted Ethnic Particularism", Slavic Review, vol. 53, no. 2 (Summer 1994), pp. 414-452
- Between Heaven and Hell: The Myth of Siberia in Russian Culture, 1993

== Awards ==
- 2002: National Jewish Book Award in the Eastern European Studies for The Jewish Century
- 2020 Valdai Discussion Club Award, awarded in the presence of Russian Minister of Foreign Affairs, Sergey Lavrov.

== See also ==
- Amy Chua, American writer on Market-dominant minorities
- Model minority
