= Kira Thurman =

American historian and musicologist

Kira Thurman is an American historian and musicologist. She was a 2017 Anna-Maria Kellen Fellow.

She is a classically trained pianist who grew up in Vienna. She graduated from University of Rochester and Eastman School of Music. She is a professor at University of Michigan.

Her article, "Performing Lieder, Hearing Race: Debating Blackness, Whiteness, and German National Identity in Interwar Central Europe" won the Central European Historical Society's Annelise Thimme prize for best article published in 2019/2020.

Singing like Germans has thus far won seven prizes: the Marfield Prize (National Award for Arts Writing), the Rock and Roll Hall of Fame Gleason Book Award, the German Studies Association's DAAD prize for best book in History/Social Sciences, the Royal Musical Association's Best Monograph Prize, the American Historical Association's George Mosse Prize, the American Musicological Society's Judy Tsou Critical Race Studies Award, and the Modern Language Association's Aldo and Jeanne Scaglione Prize for Studies in Germanic Languages and Literatures (honorable mention). NPR named it one of the Best Books of 2021.

== Works ==
- Singing Like Germans : Black Musicians in the Land of Bach, Beethoven, and Brahms Cornell University Press, 2021. ISBN 9781501759840
- Thurman, Kira (2021-08-27). "When Europe Offered Black Composers an Ear". The New York Times. ISSN 0362-4331.
