= German Orientalism in the Age of Empire =

2009 book

- Author: Suzanne L. Marchand
- Subject: History of Germany
- Publisher: Cambridge University Press
- Publication date: August 2009
- Pages: 560
- ISBN: 9780521518499

German Orientalism in the Age of Empire: Religion, Race, and Scholarship is a 2009 book on the influence of Orient studies in 19th-century Germany, written by Suzanne L. Marchand.

== Bibliography ==
- Benes, Tuska (2011). "Review of German Orientalism in the Age of Empire". Isis. 102 (1): 188–189. doi:10.1086/660249. ISSN 0021-1753. JSTOR 10.1086/660249.
- Fowden, G. (February 2011). "Rev. of German Orientalism in the Age of Empire and German Orientalism: The Study of the Middle East and Islam from 1800 to 1945". The English Historical Review. CXXVI (518): 209–212. doi:10.1093/ehr/ceq407. ISSN 0013-8266.
- Hanneder, Jürgen (2012). "Review of German Orientalism in the Age of Empire. Religion, Race and Scholarship". Zeitschrift der Deutschen Morgenländischen Gesellschaft. 162 (1): 250–253. ISSN 0341-0137. JSTOR 10.13173/zeitdeutmorggese.162.1.0250.
- Matthee, Rudi (November 2012). "German Orientalism in the Age of Empire: Religion, Race and Scholarship". Iranian Studies. 45 (6): 843–847. doi:10.1080/00210862.2012.726880. ISSN 0021-0862. S2CID 162192072.
- Penny, H. Glenn (2011). "Review of German Orientalism in the Age of Empire: Religion, Race, and Scholarship". Central European History. 44 (1): 161–163. doi:10.1017/S0008938910001275. ISSN 0008-9389. JSTOR 41238396. S2CID 145430834.
- Sidenvall, Erik (2010). "Review of German Orientalism in the Age of Empire". Church History. 79 (4): 950–952. doi:10.1017/S0009640710001381. ISSN 0009-6407. JSTOR 40962903. S2CID 161470683.
- Smith, Woodruff D. (April 2011). "Suzanne L. Marchand. German Orientalism in the Age of Empire: Religion, Race, and Scholarship. New York: Cambridge University Press. Washington, D.C.: German Historical Institute. 2009. Pp. xxxiv, 526. $60.00". The American Historical Review. 116 (2): 526–527. doi:10.1086/ahr.116.2.526. ISSN 0002-8762.
- Steinhoff, Anthony J. (2011). "Review of German Orientalism in the Age of Empire: Religion, Race, and Scholarship". German Studies Review. 34 (1): 166–167. ISSN 0149-7952. JSTOR 41303666.
- Zimmerman, Andrew; Marchand, Suzanne L.; Berghoff, Hartmut; Lazar, David (2011). "Review of German Orientalism in the Age of Empire: Religion, Race, and Scholarship". The Journal of Modern History. 83 (2): 456–457. doi:10.1086/659192. ISSN 0022-2801. JSTOR 10.1086/659192.
