= Heidelberg University Faculty of Modern Languages =

Coordinates: 49.4107295°N 8.687699°E

The Faculty of Modern Languages is one of twelve faculties at the University of Heidelberg. It comprises the Seminar for German Studies, Seminar for English Studies, Seminar for German as a Foreign Language Philology, Seminar for Translating and Interpreting, Seminar for Computational Linguistics, Seminar for Romance Studies, Seminar for Mediaeval and Neo-Latin Philology, and the Seminar for Slavic Studies.

The Seminar for German Studies is situated in Palais Boisserée since 1969.

The discipline of Romance languages exists at Heidelberg since 1842. The institute was founded in 1924. Noted Romance scholars include Karl Vossler and Ernst Robert Curtius.

The Heidelberg Seminar for Medieval Latin Philology was founded on May 2, 1957. In 1973 the Seminar's name was expanded to include Neo-Latin Philology. In 2007 the seminar celebrated its 50th anniversary. After the Medieval Latin Seminar in Munich, founded shortly after the turn of the century, the Heidelberg Seminar is the second oldest in Germany.

== See also ==
- Tübingen University Faculty of Modern Languages
