= Bachofen =

Bachofen is a surname. Notable people with the surname include:

- Elisa Bachofen (1891–1976), first woman civil engineer in Argentina
- Johann Caspar Bachofen (1695–1755), Swiss music teacher and composer
- Johann Jakob Bachofen (1815–1887), Swiss antiquarian, jurist, philologist, anthropologist, and professor
