= Memory studies =

Field of psychology

Memory studies is an academic field studying the use of memory as a tool for remembering the past. It emerged as a new way for scholars to think about past events at the end of the 20th century. Memory studies define memory as both a form of work and a contemporary phenomenon.

== Present and past memory ==
Memory is used to mark the relation of a community or a nation to its past, but past memory had a stronger and more stable boundary between the past and present. Untold pasts impinge upon the present through historical scholarship, a growing museal culture, and modern media such as photography, film, music, or the Internet.

Although remembering is about the past, it takes place in the present by establishing the significance of the past for others. Memory involves much work and is therefore an action, not just the description of a practice. Memory as a “symbolic representation of the past embedded in social action” also emphasizes its use as a practice of recollection rather than just a set of facts.

== Collective and individual memory ==
Memory acts like a snapshot of the individual, collective, and its social relation to the past. It allows for individuals, groups and societies to be creative as its anachronistic quality, which enables the ability to derive new meaning out of past events.

Memory also aids in the formation of identity. The connection of memory to identity is indirect: memory only partially determines identity through unconventional and unexpected means. Memory and the formation of identity is not an exclusive process: differing memories interact together over time to shape an individual's identity, sense of self, and understanding of the world.

== Multidirectional memory ==
In multidirectional memory, memories are not fighting for resources in a zero-sum game as competitive memory suggests; both the individual's lived memory and social collective memory can safely coexist in relation to the past. In contrast to competitive memory, multidirectional memory is “subject to ongoing negotiation, cross-referencing, and borrowing; as productive and not privative”.

Mulitdirectional memory does not focus on one isolated memory: it synthesizes multiple collective past memories into a changing post-World War II present. Multidirectional memory also allows for cross-cutting themes and examining collective issues facing by various groups rather than issues specific to individual groups.

Multidirectional memory also means that memories are not the property of groups as is suggested by proponents of competitive memory. This therefore makes the relationship between memory and identity a non-linear one. In creating meaning through multiple memories, groups are not forced to forget the memories of other groups whether they are within the same or across different geographical boundaries. “Memories are not owned by groups – nor are groups “owned” by memories. Rather, the borders of memory and identity are jagged…”

“Pursuing memory’s multidirectionality encourages us to think of the public sphere as a malleable discursive space in which groups do not simply articulate established positions but actually come into being through their dialogical interactions with others; both the subjects and spaces of the public are open to continual reconstruction”. This challenges the dichotomy many writers may express about memory operating competitively where one memory must dominate.

== Screen memory ==
In discussing multidirectional memory, it is important to highlight that screen memory is also a kind of multidirectional memory, even though screen memory operates more on the personal level while multidirectional memory is primarily collective. Screen memory is “covering up a traumatic event-another traumatic event-that cannot be approached directly”.

Screen memory gains its significance from the presence of other memories and not necessarily as a stand-alone memory. With screen memory, there is more than one memory operating at the same time, except one is displaced by another, so we may not realise the presence of multiple memories. This points to its multidirectionality. The memory being used as a replacement is usually one that is easier to confront. This however does not result in the total silencing of the other memory(ies), which would suggest competition between or among memories.
