= Folklore Institute =

Folklore Institute refers to the folklore studies program of Indiana University Bloomington (USA). The Folklore Institute, together with the Ethnomusicology Institute, constitutes the larger Department of Folklore and Ethnomusicology. The Department of Folklore and Ethnomusicology is a unit of the College of Arts and Sciences.

== Overview ==
Prior to the establishment (c. 2000) of the parallel Ethnomusicology Institute and the renaming of the paired units as The Department of Folklore and Ethnomusicology, the name "Folklore Institute" served as the overarching designation for what was already a full-fledged academic department. This unit had roots going back to the 1940s and was fully established in 1962. After the name change to Department of Folklore and Ethnomusicology, the designation Folklore Institute referred to the department's folklore faculty, the folklore graduate students that they supervised, and the folklore studies-specific teaching, research, and outreach projects that the department's folklorists pursued. Many generations of professional folklorists (and some ethnomusicologists) earned their degrees (B.A., M.A., and/or Ph.D.) from the unit when it was known as the Folklore Institute and in informal discourse the name remains synonymous with the Department of Folklore and Ethnomusicology.

Prominent scholars in the history of the Folklore Institute include the following distinguished rank faculty: Stith Thompson, Richard M. Dorson, Linda Dégh, Henry Glassie, Richard Bauman, Beverly J. Stoeltje, and Hasan M. El-Shamy.

Over its history, the Folklore Institute has trained very large number of professional folklorists. A small sample of its prominent alumni includes: Alan Dundes, Michael Owen Jones, Dorthy Noyes, Bill Ivy, Barbara Kirshenblatt-Gimblett, Sabina Magliocco, Regina Bendix, Ronald L. Baker, Simon J. Bronner, Jan Harold Brunvand, Dan Ben-Amos, and Edward D. Ives.

Like the Ethnomusicology Institute, the Folklore Institute is led by a Director. One of these two Directors typically also serves as Chair of the department as a whole. Among the long-term projects of the Folklore Institute are Traditional Arts Indiana (a statewide public folklore agency) and the Journal of Folklore Research. The Folklore Institute has long organized focused conferences in folklore studies and neighboring fields. Some of these were later published by the institute or in partnership with other publishers.

== See also ==
- Smithsonian Folklife Festival
