= Larry Thompson =

Larry , Lawrence or Laurence Thompson may refer to:

- Larry R. Thompson (born 1947), president of the Ringling College of Art plus Design in Sarasota, Florida
- Larry Thompson (lawyer) (born 1945), American lawyer and deputy Attorney General of the United States under George W. Bush
- Laurence Thompson (sinologist) (1920–2005), USC professor of East Asian languages
- Laurence Thompson (journalist), British journalist
- Lawrence Thompson, American football player
- Lawrence S. Thompson (1916–1986), University of Kentucky director of libraries
- Larry A. Thompson (born 1944), American film producer
- Larry Thompson (humorist) (1911–1973), humorist with the Miami Herald
- Larry Thompson (gridiron football) (born 1971), gridiron football wide receiver
- Larry Thompson, American referee on American Gladiators (1989 TV series)

== See also ==
- Laurence Tomson (1539–1608), English politician, author, and translator
- Lawrance Thompson, American academic at Princeton University
- Lawrie Thomson, Scottish footballer
