= Phillip McArthur =

Phillip H. McArthur is an American folklorist and anthropologist who is a Brigham Young University–Hawaii faculty member. McArthur's scholarly work focuses on the Marshall Islands. McArthur has spent much of his career documenting and analyzing Marshall Islander narratives, mythology, songs, and performances.

== Background ==
=== Education ===
McArthur initially lived in the Marshall Islands as a missionary for the Church of Jesus Christ of Latter-day Saints, and later returned for his Ph.D. research. He would later study under folklorists and scholars Richard Bauman and Beverly J. Stoeltje. He obtained an associate degree in psychology from Ricks College, a bachelor's degree in anthropology from Brigham Young University, and both master's and Ph.D. degrees in folklore studies and cultural anthropology from Indiana University Bloomington.

=== Research ===
McArthur's work in the Marshall Islands closely examines social power and indigenous epistemologies with special attention to the tumultuous relationship with the United States. His research emphasizes social theoretical and semiotic approaches to traditional narrative (i.e. myth, oral history), cultural performance (ritual, ceremony, festival, spectacle), history, cosmology, and local cultures within the contexts of decolonization, nationalism and globalization. This includes a deepening attention to political and economic forces, and their relationship to social power and practice. With a geographical specialization in Oceania, he additionally includes comparative studies on cultures of Asia, Native America, Africa and the Classical world. He also integrates deep interests in comparative philosophy, the history of ideas, dialogic ethnography, and traditional arts.

== Publications ==
Representative Publications:

- Dialogues with a Trickster: On the Margins of Myth and Ethnography in the Marshall Islands. 2024. University of Hawai'i Press.
- "The Church in the Marshall Islands: A Cultural History". In Battlefields to Temple Grounds: Latter-day Saints in Guam and Micronesia 2023. R. Devan Jensen and Rosalind Ram, eds. Religious Studies Center, Brigham Young University. Pages 67–100.
- "Oceania." In A Companion to Folklore 2012. Regina Bendix and Galit Hasan-Rokem, eds. Wiley-Blackwell Press. Pages 248–264.
- "Ambivalent Fantasies: Local Prehistories and Global Dramas in the Marshall Islands" 2008. Journal of Folklore Research 45(3): pages 263–298.
- "Modernism and Pacific Ways at Knowing: An Uneasy Dialogue in Micronesia." 2007. Pacific Rim Studies 1(1): pages 7-24
- Introductory Note "Folklore, Nationalism, and the Challenge of the Future", in The Marrow of Human Experience: Essays in Folklore, William Wilson. Ed. Jill Terry Rudy. Logan: Utah State University Press. 2006
- "Narrative, Cosmos, and Nation: Intertextuality and Power in the Marshall Islands". 2004. Journal of American Folklore 462: 1.
- "Oceania: An Overview". In CultureGrams: World Addition, Volume IV (Asia and Oceania). 2002. Lindon: Axiom Press.
- "Narrating to the Center of Power in the Marshall Islands". 2000. In We are a People: Narrative and Multiplicity in the Construction of Ethnic Identity. Philadelphia: Temple University Press. Paul Spickard and W. Jeffrey Burroughs, eds.
- "More Than Meets the Ear: A Marshallese Example of Folklore Method and Study for Pacific Collections". 1997. PIALA: Identifying, Using and Sharing Local Resources. Pages 49–71. University of Guam.
