= List of Brigham Young University–Idaho alumni =

This list of Brigham Young University-Idaho alumni includes notable graduates, non-graduate former students, and current students of Brigham Young University–Idaho (also known as BYU–Idaho or BYU–I), a four-year private college owned by the Church of Jesus Christ of Latter-day Saints (LDS Church) located in Rexburg, Idaho, United States. From 1933 to 2001, this school was a two-year junior college known as Ricks College. As of August 2008, BYU–Idaho/Ricks College had approximately 150,000 alumni. Many of them, in particular those before 2001, graduated with a two-year associate's degree or simply attended two years before moving on to another institution to complete their bachelor's degree.

== Business and finance ==
Name	Class year(s)	Degree(s)	Notability	Reference
Frank L. VanderSloot	—	A.A.	Entrepreneur, radio network owner, cattle rancher and founder and CEO of Direct Marketing company Melaleuca, Inc.	

== Educators and scholars ==
Name	Class year(s)	Degree(s)	Notability	Reference
Jeff Benedict	—	A.A.	Professor at Southern Virginia University; bestselling author	
Kory Katseanes	—	A.A.	Director of the School of Music at Brigham Young University	
Phillip McArthur	—	A.A.	Folklorist and anthropologist with notable work involving the Marshall Islands and elsewhere in Micronesia	

== Entertainment and media ==
Name	Class year(s)	Degree(s)	Notability	Reference
Benson Boone	2024 (left 2021 to pursue singing)	Unknown	Singer-songwriter	
Gregg Hale	1996, 1998–2000	A.A. graduated April 2000	Guitarist for Spiritualized	
Ryan Hamilton	—	A.A.	Stand-up comedian and actor	
Jared and Jerusha Hess	—	(transferred to BYU before graduating)	Directors and screenwriters of Napoleon Dynamite (2004)	
Timothy Holst	—		Ringmaster for Ringling Bros. and Barnum & Bailey Circus	
Art Rascon	—	A.A.	News anchor for the five o'clock ABC News in Houston, Texas	
Daryn Tufts	—	A.A.	Writer, director, producer, and actor	

== Government, law, and public policy ==
Name	Class year(s)	Degree(s)	Notability	Reference
Dean L. Cameron	1984	A.A.	Republican member of the Idaho Senate	
Danielle J. Forrest	1996	A.A.S.	U.S. circuit judge for the U.S. Court of Appeals for the Ninth Circuit	
Tom Luna	1981–1982		Educational leader	
Fred S. Martin	1974–1976	Student body (ASRC) president 1975–76	Republican member of the Idaho Senate	
Dean Mortimer	1974	A.A.	Republican member of the Idaho Senate	
Michael W. Mosman	1979	A.B.	U.S. district judge for the U.S. District Court for the District of Oregon	
Mark Ricks		A.A.	Lt. governor of Idaho	

== Other ==
Name	Class year(s)	Degree(s)	Notability	Reference
Steven Koecher			Journalist, disappeared in 2009	
Wayne Quinton			Inventor of biomedical technology	

== Religion ==
Note: All positions listed are within the Church of Jesus Christ of Latter-day Saints unless otherwise noted.

Name	Class year(s)	Degree(s)	Notability	Reference
Marion G. Romney			Member of the First Presidency	

== Sports ==
Name	Class year(s)	Degree(s)	Notability	Reference
Gary Andersen	1984	(transferred to University of Utah before graduating)	Football coaching positions at University of Utah, Oregon State, Wisconsin Badgers and Utah State Aggies	
Jason Buck	—	(transferred to BYU before graduating)	National Football League athlete	
Ben Cahoon	—	(transferred to BYU before graduating)	Former slotback for the Canadian Football League, later a receivers coach at BYU	
Troy Cate	—		Retired Major League Baseball pitcher who debuted with the St. Louis Cardinals in 2007	
John Denney			Long snapper for the Miami Dolphins in the National Football League	
Marc Dunn	1999–2000		NFL and NFL Europe player	
Rulon Gardner			Two-time Olympic medalist in Greco-Roman wrestling (gold in 2000), 1993 NCJAA Heavyweight National Champion	
Kelly Graves	1986		Current head coach for the Oregon Ducks women's basketball team	
Matt Lindstrom			MLB pitcher for the Florida Marlins	
Stew Morrill	1970–1972		Retired head coach for the Utah State Aggies men's basketball team	
Edwin Mulitalo			NFL offensive lineman for the Baltimore Ravens (1999–2006) and the Detroit Lions (2007–2008)	
Jose Portilla			Football player	

== Writers and artists ==
Name	Class year(s)	Degree(s)	Notability	Reference
Blair Buswell	—	A.A.	Sports sculptor	
Brian Crane	—	(transferred to BYU before graduating)	Cartoonist, creator of newspaper comic Pickles	
Ben Hammond	—		Sculptor known for Pro Football Hall of Fame busts	
Del Parson	—		Painter known for his Latter-day Saint-themed paintings	
Alex Warnick	—		Painter known for ornithology and bird paintings	

== Notes ==
- Blank cells indicate missing information; em-dashes (—) indicate that the alumnus attended but never graduated from BYU–Idaho.
