= Ronald L. Baker =

American historian (1937–2023)

Ronald L. Baker (June 30, 1937 – June 1, 2023) was an American folklorist, historian, scholar of literature and onomastics, educator, and author.

== Life and career ==
Ronald Lee Baker was born June 30, 1937, in Indianapolis, Indiana. He earned his B.S. in Business Administration from Indiana State University in 1960 and received an M.A. in philosophy from the same institution in 1961. He did graduate work in English at the University of Illinois at Urbana–Champaign. In 1966, he began teaching at Indiana State University where he advanced to become professor and chair of the English Department before retirement in 2006. He attended the Folklore Institute of America at Indiana University in the summer of 1966, and subsequently enrolled in the doctoral program in folklore while also minoring in comparative literature and philosophy. He received his Ph.D. from Indiana University in 1969 with a dissertation on folklore in the writings of Rowland Robinson. He also taught English and folklore courses at the University of Illinois (instructor, 1963–1965; visiting professor, 1972–1973), Indiana University at Fort Wayne (teaching associate, 1965–1966), and Indiana University at Bloomington (visiting professor, 1975, 1978, 1984).

Baker's research was mostly on language and narrative in American literature, historical documents, and folklore. He specialized in the study of place names, particularly in the Midwest. He published over 100 articles in professional journals, magazines and was the author or editor of nine books: Folklore in the Writings of Rowland E. Robinson (1973), Indiana Place Names (1975), Hoosier Folk Legends (1984), Jokelore: Humorous Folktales from Indiana (1986), French Folklife in Old Vincennes (1989), The Study of Place Names (1991), From Needmore to Prosperity: Hoosier Place Names in Folklore and History (1995), Homeless, Friendless, and Penniless: The WPA Interviews with Former Slaves Living in Indiana (2000), and Jesse Stuart and the Hoosier Schoolmasters (2007). He also served as editor of three journals: Indiana Names (1970–1974), Midwestern Folklore (1975–1999), and The Folklore Historian (1990–2000). He received the Lifetime Achievement Award from the History and Folklore Section of the American Folklore Society in 1988, Indiana State University Research/Creativity Award in 1990, and the Presidential Medal in recognition of exemplary performance as a faculty member at Indiana State University in 2000. In 1996 he was elected a Fellow of the American Folklore Society, and he served as executive secretary-treasurer (1988–2000) and president (1970–1979) of the Hoosier Folklore Society. In 2005, colleagues presented him with a festschrift in his honor, entitled Manly Traditions: The Folk Roots of American Masculinities, edited by Simon J. Bronner (Indiana University Press). The contents referred to his work in interpreting the connections of jokes, songs, recitations, and legends to masculinity as well as regionalism, ethnicity, and aging. In 2006, the Hoosier Folklore Society dedicated its annual meeting to him in recognition of his service to the Society and the field of folklore studies.

Baker died on June 1, 2023, at the age of 85.
