= John Laudun =

- Born: Lafayette, Louisiana, United States
- Education: B.A. in Philosophy & English; M.A. in English; Ph.D. in Folklore Studies
- Alma mater: Louisiana State University; Syracuse University; Indiana University Bloomington
- Known for: folklorist
- Children: 1
- Awards: Jacob K. Javits Fellow; MacArthur Scholar
- Website: johnlaudun.org

John Laudun is a folklorist, essayist, and professor at University of Louisiana at Lafayette.

He focuses on creativity across a broad range of media and behaviors. He has published widely in scholarly journals, anthologies, and has a book forthcoming, but he has also reached out to broader audiences with essays in various outlets, including his own website. He has appeared on camera in several films and been interviewed by The New York Times and The Atlanta Constitution, among others.

== Education and career ==
Born in Lafayette, Louisiana and raised in Lafayette, Franklin, and Baton Rouge, he graduated from Louisiana State University with a dual degree in philosophy and English in 1986. He received a master's of art in English from Syracuse University in 1989, where he developed his interest in folklore studies based on his reading of post-structuralist theories. Laudun obtained a doctorate in folkloristics from Indiana University Bloomington in 1999, where he studied under Richard Bauman and Henry Glassie.

As he was finishing up work on his dissertation, he was offered a position at the University of Louisiana at Lafayette, where he joined the English faculty, where he embarked upon a number of efforts, including editing the Louisiana Folklore Miscellany, published by the Louisiana Folklore Society, from 2000 to 2005.

== Honors and awards ==
While finishing up his undergraduate work at Louisiana State University, Laudun received a Jacob K. Javits Fellowship from the U.S. Department of Education to pursue graduate work in creativity. He was a Javits Fellow at both Syracuse University (1987–89) and Indiana University (1990–92). While at Syracuse, he received the Delmore Schwartz Prize for Poetry. At Indiana University, he was selected as a MacArthur Scholar for the Indiana Center for Global Change and World Peace.

== Publications ==
=== Books ===
The Amazing Crawfish Boat (University Press of Mississippi, 2016) tells the story of how a bunch of Cajun and German farmers and fabricators invented a traditional amphibious boat.

=== Scholarly Essays ===
2019. TED Talks as Data. Journal of Cultural Analytics.

2019. Trucks under Water: A Legend from the 2016 Flood. Louisiana Folklore Miscellany 28: pages 20–36.

2018. Tallying Treasure Tales: A Reconsideration of the Structure and Nature of Local Legends. Contemporary Legend 3(7): pages 1–27.

2014. Counting Tales: Towards a Computational Approach to Folk Narrative. Folk Culture Forum 5/228: pages 20–35. Translator (to Chinese): An Deming.

--- and Jonathan Goodwin. 2013. Computing Folklore Studies. Mapping over a Century of Scholarly Production through Topics. Journal of American Folklore Volume 126, Number 502 (Autumn 2013), pages 455–475.

2012. "Talking Shit" in Rayne: How Aesthetic Features Reveal Ethical Structures. Journal of American Folklore Volume 125, Number 497 (Summer 2012), pp. 304–326.

2011. A Constellation of Stars: The Study of Creativity on a Human Scale, or How a Bunch of Cajun and German Farmers and Fabricators in Louisiana Invented a Traditional Amphibious Boat. In The Individual in Tradition. Eds. Ray Cashman, Tom Mould, Pravina Shukla. Bloomington, Indiana: Indiana University Press.

2008. Gumbo This: The State of a Dish, in Acadians and Cajuns: The Politics and Culture of French Minorities in North America, pages 160–175. Ed. Ursula Mathis-Moser and Günter Bischof. Innsbruck, Austria: Innsbruck University Press.

2004. Reading Hurston Writing. African American Review 38(1): pages 45–60.

2001. Talk about the Past in a Midwestern Town: "It Was There At That Time." Midwestern Folklore 27(2): pages 41–54.

2000. "There's Not Much to Talk about When You’re Taking Pictures of Houses": The Poetics of Vernacular Spaces. Southern Folklore 57(2): pages 135–158.

== Media Appearances ==
- 2006 - Louisiana Story (Laudun is one of three narrators and appears in the film).

== See also ==
- Folklore of the United States
