= Dan Ben-Amos =

Folklorist (1934–2023)

- דן בן-עמוס
- Born: September 3, 1934; Tel Aviv, Mandatory Palestine
- Died: March 26, 2023 (aged 88)

Academic background
- Education: Hebrew University of Jerusalem; Indiana University Bloomington

Academic work
- Discipline: Folklore
- Institutions: University of Pennsylvania

Dan Ben-Amos (Hebrew: דן בן-עמוס; September 3, 1934 – March 26, 2023) was an Israeli-American folklorist and academic who worked as a professor at the University of Pennsylvania, Philadelphia, where he held the Graduate Program Chair for the Department of Folklore and Folklife.

== Early life and education ==
Ben-Amos was born in Tel Aviv (then in Mandatory Palestine) and grew up in Petah Tikva.

Before starting his studies at Hebrew University of Jerusalem, he served in the Nahal Brigade of the Israel Defense Forces, and in the course of his service he was in a unit that guarded the first prime minister of Israel, David Ben-Gurion, until he retired to kibbutz Sde-Boker in the Israeli Desert. Upon discharge he was a member of Kibbutz Yiftaḥ where he was a shepherd.

At Hebrew University of Jerusalem, he initially majored in Biblical studies and English literature. During his sophomore year, dissatisfied with his academic major, he switched to pursue a degree in Hebrew literature with an interest in folklore, studying with Dov Noy. He received his Bachelor of Arts from Hebrew University of Jerusalem in 1961.

Under advice from Professor Dov Noy at Hebrew University of Jerusalem, Ben-Amos continued his education in the United States at Indiana University Bloomington, which at that time was the only folklore Doctor of Philosophy granting institution in the United States. When he arrived at Bloomington, Indiana, and walked toward the campus, he wondered at the sight of the corn-pipe smoking hoosiers that were swinging on their porches and wondered whether they were his future professors, but when he reached the campus he realized that Bloomington was a university town after all, and (although originally turned off by the town of Bloomington) he decided to stay, and he received his Master of Arts in 1964 and Doctor of Philosophy in 1967 in folklore. At Hebrew University of Jerusalem and Bloomington, Ben-Amos was trained in the comparatist tradition.

Towards the end of his education and beginning of his career, Ben-Amos, along with other young folklorists, Roger Abrahams, Alan Dundes, Robert Georges, and Kenneth Goldstein, became affectionately labeled "the Young Turks" by Richard Dorson, prominent folklorist and teacher of Ben-Amos. Although Richard Bauman was not originally included in this group, his work has come to be associated with that of the Young Turks; these young folklorists broke with traditional perspectives of folkloristics, which focus on the text and its content. Collectively, they focused on context in an effort to better understand folklore and the way people use folklore.

In his influential essay “Toward a Definition of Folklore in Context” (1971) Ben-Amos promoted a new way of defining folklore based on its context. With its focus on context, Ben-Amos's work helped to usher in a new performance based perceptive in the field of folkloristics.

== Professional career ==
Before beginning his Assistant Professorship in Anthropology at the University of California, Los Angeles, which he held from 1966 to 1967, Ben-Amos conducted folklore research in Nigeria on the oral tradition of the Edo people in Benin City and its rural surroundings. He arrived in Nigeria for the first time on January 15, 1966, the day of the first military coup.

In 1967, Ben-Amos began teaching at the University of Pennsylvania, Philadelphia, serving as an assistant professor for three years and associate professor for seven. He became professor of Folklore and Folklife in 1977, holding the title for 22 years. In 1999 he joined Penn's department of Asian and Middle Eastern Studies; after the split of the department into sub-specialties in 2004, he became professor of Near Eastern Languages and Civilizations. He also served as Chair of the Graduate Program in Folklore and Folklife.

Ben-Amos's scholarly interests included Jewish folklore, African folklore, humor, the history of folklore, and structural analysis.

Ben-Amos served on the executive board of the American Folklore Society from 1977 to 1980. He was an associate editor from 1981 to 1984 and book editor from 1988 to 1990 of the Journal of American Folklore. He also served as the general editor to the Indiana Press series Translations in Folklore studies and, from 1996, as the editor of the Raphael Patai Series in Jewish Folklore and Anthropology (Wayne State University Press).

Dan Ben-Amos's articles appeared in translation in the following languages: Chinese, Estonian, Finnish, French, German, Hebrew, Italian, Lithuanian, Portuguese, Russian, Spanish, Thai, and Turkish.

== Death ==
Ben-Amos died on March 26, 2023, at the age of 88.

== Awards ==
2006 National Jewish Book Award, winner in the Sephardic Culture category for Folktales of the Jews. Volume 1: Tales from the Sephardic Dispersion

2006 National Jewish Book Award, finalist in the Scholarship category for Folktales of the Jews. Volume 1: Tales from the Sephardic Dispersion. Edited with Commentary (Dov Noy, Consulting Editor). Philadelphia: The Jewish Publication Society, 2006.

2014 American Folklore Society Lifetime Scholarly Achievement Award

== Fellowships ==
1972–1973 American Council for Learned Societies

1975–1976 John Simon Guggenheim Fellowship

1980–1981 National Endowment for the Humanities

== Books ==
- In Praise of the Baal Shem Tov, editor and translator, in collaboration with Jerome R. Mintz. Bloomington: Indiana University Press. 1970.
- Folklore: Performance and Communication, ed. in collaboration with Kenneth S. Goldstein. Approaches to Semiotics, 40. The Hague:Mouton Press. 1975.
- Sweet Words: Storytelling Events in Benin. Philadelphia: Institute for the Study of Human Issues, 1975.
- Folklore Genres, ed. American Folklore Society Bibliographical and Special Series, Volume 26, Texas: University of Texas Press, 1976. (Reprint of 1969a with an 'Introduction' and a "Selected Bibliography")
- Folklore in Context: Essays. New Delhi, Madras: South Asian Publishers. 1982.
- Cultural Memory and the Construction of Identity, ed. (With Liliane Weissberg), Detroit: Wayne State University Press. (1999).
- Folktales of the Jews. Volume 1: Tales from the Sephardic (2006). Volume II: 1970, In Praise of the Baal Shem Tov, editor and translator, in collaboration with Jerome R. Mintz. Bloomington: Indiana University Press. (Paperback edition, 1972. 2nd paperback edition, New York: Schocken, 1984; 3rd edition Northvale, New Jersey: Jason Aronson, Jewish Book Club, Main Selection, January 1994).
- The Diary, The Epic of Everyday Life, with Batsheva Ben-Amos. Bloomington: Indiana University Press (2020).

== Relevant literature ==
- Juweng Zhang. "Dan Ben Amos (1934-2023)". Western Folklore 83.1:111-134.
