= Simon J. Bronner =

American historian

- סימון ברונר
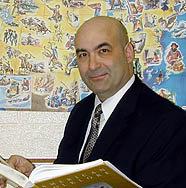
- Portrait of Bronner
- Born: April 7, 1954 (age 72); Haifa, Israel
- Occupations: Folklorist; ethnologist; historian; sociologist; educator; college dean; author

Simon J. Bronner (Hebrew: סימון ברונר; born April 7 1954, in Haifa, Israel) is an American folklorist, ethnologist, historian, sociologist, educator, college dean, and author.

== Life and career ==
Bronner's parents were Polish-Jewish Holocaust survivors who immigrated to the United States from Israel in 1960. His childhood in the U.S. was spent in Chicago and New York City. His undergraduate study was in political science, history, and folklore (mentored by European and American folklorist W.F.H. Nicolaisen and political-social theorists Harold L. Nieburg and Louis C. Gawthrop) at Binghamton University (B.A., 1974) and then he received his M.A. in American Folk Culture at the Cooperstown Graduate Programs of the State University of New York at Oneonta (1977), where he also studied social history, ethnology, and museum studies (including work with historically oriented ethnologists Louis C. Jones, Bruce Buckley, and Roderick Roberts). He stayed in Cooperstown to work for the New York State Historical Association as director of the Archive of New York State Folklife, before moving to Indiana University, Bloomington, where he completed his Ph.D. in Folklore and American Studies (1981) and worked for the Indiana University Museum of History, Anthropology, and Folklore (now the Mathers Museum of World Cultures), and was assistant to Richard M. Dorson on the Journal of the Folklore Institute (now the Journal of Folklore Research). In 1981, he became assistant professor of American Studies and folklore at the Pennsylvania State University in the graduate American Studies Program at Harrisburg, and was promoted to the rank of Distinguished University Professor in 1991. He has also taught as Walt Whitman Distinguished Chair in American Cultural Studies at Leiden University in the Netherlands (2006), Visiting Professor of Folklore and the History of American Civilization at Harvard University (1997–1998), Fulbright Professor of American Studies at Osaka University in Japan (1996–1997), and Visiting Distinguished Professor of American Studies at the University of California at Davis (1991). He was a scholar-in-residence at the Latvian Academy of Culture, Riga, Latvia, in fall 2017. In 2018-2019, he held the Maxwell C. Weiner distinguished professorship in humanities at the Missouri University of Science and Technology, part of the University of Missouri system.

In 1990, he was founding director of the Center for Pennsylvania Culture Studies (now the Pennsylvania Center for Folklore) and in 2007, the Center for Holocaust and Jewish Studies at the Pennsylvania State University, Harrisburg. He served as Coordinator of the American Studies Program at the college from 1987 to 2002, founding director of the college's doctoral program in American Studies in 2008 (and subsequently chair of the expanding program that included B.A., M.A., Ph.D., and two certificate programs in folklore and ethnography and heritage and museum studies), and received the Mary Turpie Prize from the American Studies Association in recognition of his program building, teaching, and advising. The American Folklore Society bestowed a similar award on him, the Kenneth Goldstein Lifetime Achievement Award for Academic Leadership, and Penn State honored him with its Graduate Program Leadership Award. From 2002 to 2004, he served as interim director of the School of Humanities at the college. He also received awards in the areas of research, teaching, and service from the college. He received a teaching and advising award in doctoral education from the Northeast Association of Graduate Schools. He has edited the journals Folklore Historian (1983–1989), Material Culture (1983–1986), and book series Studies in Folklore and Ethnology (Lexington Books), American Material Culture and Folklife (UMI Research Press), Material Worlds (University Press of Kentucky), Pennsylvania German History and Culture (Pennsylvania State University Press), and Jewish Cultural Studies (Littman Library of Jewish Civilization), recipient in 2021 of the National Jewish Book Award for education and identity. In 2011, he was named the editor of the Encyclopedia of American Studies online (published by Johns Hopkins University Press). He was elected to the Fellows of the American Folklore Society in 1994 and received the Wayland Hand Prize for best article on history and folklore and the Peter and Iona Opie Prize for best book on children’s folklore from the Society. In 2017, he received the lifetime achievement medal from the American Folklore Society for his work on children's folklore, sociology, and ethnography, followed by the Society's award for lifetime scholarly achievement in 2018. In 2020, his book The Practice of Folklore: Essays Toward a Theory of Tradition received the Chicago Folklore Prize for the best book-length work of folklore scholarship for the year; the prize is the oldest international award recognizing excellence in folklore scholarship. He also received the John Ben Snow Foundation Prize and Regional Council of Historical Societies Award of Merit for Old-Time Music Makers of New York State and the Encyclopedia of American Folklife was designated an outstanding academic title by Choice and "Editor's Choice" by Booklist/Reference Books Bulletin for 2006. He received a National Endowment for the Humanities Research Fellowship in 1984 at the Winterthur Museum, Rockefeller Foundation Fellowship (1978–1981), and two Fulbright Program lecturing awards (1996–1997, 2006). In 2019, he became Dean of the College of General Studies and distinguished professor of social sciences at the University of Wisconsin Milwaukee.

== Academic and public focus ==
Much of Bronner's scholarship has been on the issue of tradition, especially in relation to modernity, folk culture and popular culture, and creativity. He has been an advocate of "structuralist" and "symbolist" approaches to the interpretation of cultures integrating historical, ethnographic, sociological, and psychological perspectives with particular attention to developmental issues across the life course and ethnic process and practice. He has also highlighted the politics of tradition and culture and the ways that contested public debates can be symbolically analyzed in behavioral, material, and verbal rhetoric to show systems of belief and communication in conflict. Examples are the animal rights protest movement, the national campaign of Joseph Lieberman for vice-president, and anti-hazing campaigns in the Navy. He has proposed in Grasping Things and The Practice of Folklore: Essays Toward a Theory of Tradition a folkloristic perspective on practice theory using an analytical perspective on cultural "praxis," i.e., cultural practices and processes that symbolize socially shared ways of thinking and draw attention to tradition as an adaptive strategy. Many of his essays raise questions about traditions regarding the personal motivations and psychological states, historical conditions and precedents, social identities, and underlying mental processes that explain the function and persistence of cultural expressions.

Bronner's main area of study has been the United States and he has been a figure in the academic development of American cultural studies with attention to ethnic, religious, occupational, and age groups, particularly Jews, Pennsylvania Germans, and African Americans. His work in Jewish studies includes founding the Jewish Cultural Studies Series for the Littman Library of Jewish Civilization (6 volumes), and authoring Jewish Cultural Studies (Wayne State University Press, 2021) with a practice-theory perspective on folklore and literature, Jewish humor, scholarship on Yiddish, Jewish material culture, adapted and invented rituals, and Holocaust memorialization and social history. He has also promoted international comparative studies, with field research in Japan, Poland, England, Israel, and the Netherlands. Bronner’s major scholarly contributions have been in the topics of material culture and folklife (particularly in folk art and architecture) in books such as American Material Culture and Folklife, Folk Art and Art Worlds, The Carver’s Art, and Grasping Things, consumer culture (Consuming Visions), history and theory of folklore studies (Folklore: The Basics, Explaining Traditions: Folk Behavior in Modern Culture, Following Tradition: Folklore in the Discourse of American Culture, and American Folklore Studies: An Intellectual History), ethnic studies (particularly for Jews, Pennsylvania Germans, and African Americans), ritual and belief (Crossing the Line), masculinity studies (Manly Traditions), American roots music (blues and old-time music) in Old-Time Music Makers of New York State, animal-human relations (in practices such as hunting and gaming), and developmental psychology and culture across the life course (particularly in childhood and old age) in American Children’s Folklore, Piled Higher and Deeper: The Folklore of Student Life, and Chain Carvers: Old Men Crafting Meaning. He followed work in material culture with studies in physical culture, the analysis of the body and social processes of embodiment in sports and strength athletics. Another scholarly trajectory arising from his studies of technology and media is in digital culture and its social psychology. He has also contributed to the study of literary journalism with Lafcadio Hearn's America and articles offering a psychological profile of the famous nineteenth century writer Lafcadio Hearn who worked in America and Japan. He edited the most comprehensive reference work in American folklife studies, Encyclopedia of American Folklife, in 4 volumes (2006) and followed with the methodogical reference work Oxford Handbook of American Folklore and Folklife Studies for Oxford University Press (2018).

As a prominent educator and academic administrator involved in restructuring higher education to meet cultural and technological changes in the twenty-first century, Bronner has been a frequent consultant and presenter on curricular reform, general and interdisciplinary education, online delivery of academic programs, enhancing cultural diversity, and community outreach. Universities he has served and for which he has created reports include the University of Texas, University of Iowa, University of North Carolina, Trinity College, University of Mt. Union, Roger Williams University, and Hong Kong University.

Bronner has been active in community institutions serving the public, serving as consultant and curator for many museums, festivals, and historical and cultural organizations. In 2018 he received a fellowship from the Smithsonian Institution's Lemelson Center for the Study of Invention and Innovation related to his work on physical culture and previously he was a NEH fellow at the Winterthur Museum. He received a lifetime achievement award for his contributions to public folklore and folklife from the New Jersey Folk Festival in 2015. These activities combine with his development of the academic field of heritage studies, also called "public heritage," focusing on issues of public presentations of history, art, society, and culture, especially as communities interpret their legacies for themselves. His book Popularizing Pennsylvania (1996), for example, examined the links of Progressive politics, environmental conservation, and public history and folklore in the career of Henry W. Shoemaker (1880–1958), America’s first official state folklorist, chairman of the Pennsylvania Historical Commission, ambassador to Bulgaria (1930–1933), and prominent newspaper publisher. Bronner has been the project scholar for the Pennsylvania House of Representatives Oral History Project, chair of the Cultural Heritage Advisory Board for the Pennsylvania Heritage Affairs Commission, and Commonwealth Speaker for the Pennsylvania Humanities Council. In 2018, the American Folklore Society bestowed its Lifetime Scholarly Achievement Award on Bronner.

== Books ==
- Folklore and Ethnology of the Modern World: A Theory of Cultural Engagement. Routledge, 2025.
- Americaness: Inquiries into the Thought and Culture of the United States. New York: Routledge, 2021.
- Jewish Cultural Studies. Detroit: Wayne State University Press, 2021.
- The Practice of Folklore: Essays Toward a Theory of Tradition. Jackson: University Press of Mississippi, 2019.
- (ed.) Oxford Handbook of American Folklore and Folklife Studies. New York: Oxford University Press, 2019.
- (ed.) Contexts of Folklore: Festschrift for Dan Ben-Amos. New York: Peter Lang, 2019 (with Wolfgang Mieder).
- (ed.) Connected Jews: Expressions of Community in Analogue and Digital Culture. London: Liverpool University Press, 2018 (with Caspar Battegay).
- Folklore: The Basics. New York: Routledge, 2017.
- (ed.) Youth Cultures in America. Santa Barbara, CA: Greenwood-ABC-CLIO, 2016 (with Cindy Dell Clark).
- Whirligigs: The Art of Peter Gelker. Fullerton, CA: Grand Central Press, 2014 (with Lynn Gamwell).
- (ed.) Framing Jewish Culture: Boundaries and Representations. Oxford, UK: Littman, 2013.
- Campus Traditions: Folklore from the Old-Time College to the Modern Mega-University. Jackson: University Press of Mississippi, 2012.
- Explaining Traditions: Folk Behavior in Modern Culture. Lexington: University Press of Kentucky, 2011.
- (ed.) Revisioning Ritual: Jewish Traditions in Transition. Oxford: Littman, 2011.
- (ed.) Jews at Home: The Domestication of Identity. Oxford: Littman, 2010.
- Greater Harrisburg's Jewish Community. Charleston, SC: Arcadia, 2010.
- Killing Tradition: Inside Hunting and Animal Rights Controversies. Lexington: University Press of Kentucky, 2008.
- Steelton.Charleston: Arcadia, 2008 (with Michael Barton).
- (ed.)Jewishness: Expression, Identity, and Representation. Oxford, UK, and Portland, OR: Littman, 2008.
- (ed.)The Meaning of Folklore: The Analytical Essays of Alan Dundes. Logan: Utah State University Press, 2007, 2nd edition with new preface 2021.
- (ed.)Encyclopedia of American Folklife. 4 vols. Armonk, NY: M.E. Sharpe, 2006.
- Crossing the Line: Violence, Play, and Drama in Naval Equator Traditions. Amsterdam: Amsterdam University Press, 2006.
- (ed.)Manly Traditions: The Folk Roots of American Masculinities. Bloomington: Indiana University Press, 2005.
- Folk Nation: Folklore in the Creation of American Tradition. Lanham, MD: Rowman and Littlefield, 2002.
- (ed.) Lafcadio Hearn’s America. Lexington: University Press of Kentucky, 2002.
- (ed.) The Meanings of Tradition. Los Angeles: California Folklore Society, 2000.
- Following Tradition: Folklore in the Discourse of American Culture. Logan: Utah State University Press, 1998.
- Popularizing Pennsylvania: Henry W. Shoemaker and the Progressive Uses of Folklore and History. University Park: Penn State Press, 1996.
- Ethnic Ancestry in Pennsylvania: An Analysis of Self-Identification. Middletown: Pennsylvania State Data Center, 1996.
- The Carver’s Art: Crafting Meaning from Wood. Lexington: University Press of Kentucky, 1996.
- Piled Higher and Deeper: The Folklore of Student Life. Little Rock: August House Publishers, 1995.
- (ed.) Creativity and Tradition in Folklore: New Directions. Logan: Utah State University Press, 1992.
- (ed.) American Material Culture and Folklife. Logan: Utah State University Press, 1992.
- (ed.) Folk Art and Art Worlds. Logan: Utah State University Press, 1992 (with John Michael Vlach).
- Piled Higher and Deeper: The Folklore of Campus Life. Little Rock: August House Publishers, 1990.
- American Children's Folklore. Little Rock, August House Publishers, 1988. Annotated Edition, 1989.
- (ed.) Consuming Visions: Accumulation and Display of Goods in America, 1880–1920. New York: W. W. Norton, 1989.
- (ed.) Folklife Studies from the Gilded Age: Object, Rite, and Custom in Victorian America. Ann Arbor: UMI Research Press, 1988.
- Old-Time Music Makers of New York State. Syracuse: Syracuse University Press, 1987.
- Grasping Things: Folk Material Culture and Mass Society in America. Lexington: University Press of Kentucky, 1986.
- (ed.) Folk Art and Art Worlds. Ann Arbor: UMI Research Press, 1986 (with John Michael Vlach).
- American Folklore Studies: An Intellectual History. Lawrence: University Press of Kansas, 1986.
- Chain Carvers: Old Men Crafting Meaning. Lexington: University Press of Kentucky, 1985.
- (ed.) American Material Culture and Folklife: A Prologue and Dialogue. Ann Arbor: UMI Research Press, 1985.
- (ed.) American Folk Art: A Guide to Sources. New York: Garland Publishing, 1984.
