= Cooperstown Graduate Program =

Graduate museum studies program at SUNY Oneonta

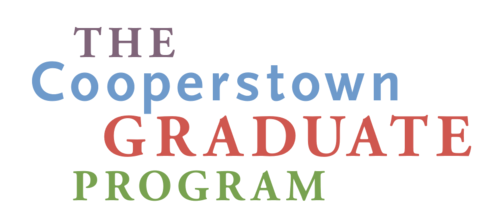
- Other name: CGP
- Established: 1964
- Founder: Louis C. Jones
- Parent institution: State University of New York at Oneonta
- Director: Gretchen Sorin
- Academic staff: 9
- Administrative staff: 1
- Total staff: 10
- Students: 50
- Location: 5838 State Route 80, Cooperstown, New York, 13326, United States; 42°43′6″N 74°55′35″W
- Campus: Rural
- Colors: Blue, Red, and Green
- Mascot: Plastic flamingo
- Website: cgpmuseumstudies.org

The Cooperstown Graduate Program (CGP) is the first and oldest dedicated museum studies program within the United States. It provides a Master of Arts degree in Museum Studies, with concentrations in science museum studies and history museum studies. Part of the State University of New York at Oneonta, the Cooperstown Graduate Program is located in Cooperstown, known as the "village of museums." It is considered an important part of the development of public history within the United States.

== History ==
The Cooperstown Graduate Program was formed in 1964 by Louis C. Jones in a joint effort between Oneonta and the New York State Historical Association (now the Fenimore Art Museum), a folklorist that wanted a museum training program that centered "ordinary people" and taught practical administrative skills. This was a conscious rejection of the University of Delaware's Winterthur Program in American Material Culture, which focuses almost exclusively on decorative arts and curation. The Cooperstown Graduate Program is considered the most lasting and successful legacy of Jones's experiments in integrating public folklore and academic training, known as "the Cooperstown Idea."

The Cooperstown and Winterthur programs remain friendly rivals. The Cooperstown Graduate Program's mascot, a plastic flamingo, comes from this rivalry; the plastic flamingo represents the material culture of ordinary people versus the highbrow decorative arts represented by Winterthur.

Historically, the Cooperstown Graduate Program offered graduate degrees in American folk culture and art conservation in addition to museum studies. The folk culture program was discontinued in 1979, while the art conservation program was moved to Buffalo State University in 1987.

The Cooperstown Graduate Program is noted for its large oral history archive, oral history training, and the integration of oral history into the digital humanities.

== Academics ==
The Cooperstown Graduate Program is a generalist museum training program with concentrations in history or science museums. While there are core courses shared between both concentrations and students of one concentration are encouraged to take courses in the other, each concentration has distinct courses and requirements. A thesis was once required, but is now optional.

== Admissions ==
Cooperstown Graduate Program students are admitted after an interview weekend, traditionally held in-person. Today, students may opt to attend the weekend online instead. 40 candidates are selected for interview and up to 25 are accepted.

== Faculty ==
As of 2026, the Cooperstown Graduate Program has 6 permanent faculty and 3 adjunct faculty. Notable faculty members include:

- Bruce R. Buckley, first director and folklorist
- Cindy Falk, professor of material culture
- Louis C. Jones, founder and folklorist
- Peter Rutkoff
- Gretchen Sorin, alumna, director, and professor of history
- Langdon Wright, folklorist and historian

== Cooperstown Graduate Association ==
Alumni of the Cooperstown Graduate Program become members of the Cooperstown Graduate Association (CGA). The Cooperstown Graduate Association supports the Cooperstown Graduate Program through the funding of scholarships and the hosting of lectures.

== Notable alumni ==
- Simon J. Bronner, folklorist and historian
- Richard Candee, historical preservationist
- Henry Glassie, folklorist
- Katherine Grier, historian
- Greg S. Harris, president of the Rock and Roll Hall of Fame
- Gretchen Sorin, exhibit designer and historian
