= Richard Candee =

American historian and preservationist

Richard M. Candee
- Occupations: Historian, Preservationist, Professor Emeritus
- Employer: Boston University

Academic background
- Education: Oberlin College, Cooperstown Graduate Program, University of Pennsylvania, University of York

Academic work
- Notable works: Building Portsmouth, Maritime Portsmouth

Richard M. Candee is an American historian, preservationist, and professor emeritus of American and New England Studies at Boston University. He is known for his extensive work in historic preservation, vernacular architecture, and Industrial archaeology, particularly in New England.

== Education ==
Candee earned his Ph.D. and M.A. in American Civilization from the University of Pennsylvania. He also studied vernacular architecture at the University of York, England, and obtained an M.A. from the Cooperstown Graduate Program (SUNY/Oneonta). His undergraduate degree (B.A.) was from Oberlin College.

== Career ==
From 1969 to 1976, Candee served as an architectural historian at Old Sturbridge Village, where he conducted a regional survey of New England textile mill village buildings. He later became a professor at Boston University, directing the Preservation Studies Program from 1983 to 2004 and co-directing a joint M.A./J.D. program on Preservation and the Law.

Candee has served as a Trustee of Society for the Preservation of New England Antiquities (now Historic New England) and the Peabody Essex Museum. He served as President of the Portsmouth Athenæum from 1980 to 1985 and as an Officer of the Portsmouth Historical Society from 2005 to 2023. Additionally, he held leadership roles in professional organizations, serving as President of the Society for Industrial Archeology in 1976 and the Vernacular Architecture Forum in 1992.

Candee co-founded Portsmouth Advocates in 1980 and curated numerous exhibitions. His work led to the publication of Building Portsmouth: The Neighborhoods and Architecture of New Hampshire’s Oldest City and other scholarly contributions.

Candee has curated and co-curated numerous historical exhibitions, including those on artists such as Russell Cheney and Thomas P. Moses. He also led a Smithsonian fellowship resulting in a traveling exhibition on 19th-century invention.

== Honors and awards ==
- 1962 – Fellow, Heritage Foundation, Deerfield, MA
- 1964 – Geo. G. & Carrie C. Life Prize in American History, Oberlin College
- 1988 – 25th Anniversary Award, Massachusetts Historical Commission
- 1991 – Norton Prize, Society for Industrial Archeology
- 1992 – Arthur Gerrier Award, Portsmouth Advocates
- 1993 – Sullivan Fellowship, Museum of American Textile History
- 1994 & 1999 – Pasold Research Grants, Pasold Research Fund, England
- 1997 – Senior Fellow, Lemelson Center, Smithsonian NMAH
- 2003 – Elected Member, American Antiquarian Society
- 2005 – Lifetime Achievement Award, Massachusetts Historical Commission
- 2007 – Preservation Achievement Award, New Hampshire Preservation Alliance
- 2008 – Citizen of the Year, Greater Portsmouth Chamber of Commerce
- 2010 – Inaugural Profiles in Preservation Award, Preservation Massachusetts
- 2013 – Award for Excellence, Citizen Initiative, Memorial Bridge Project
- 2017 – Joyce G. Volk Award of Dedication & Service, Warner House Association
- 2018 – Portsmouth Advocates' John Grossman Award, Portsmouth Historical Society

== Selected publications ==
=== Books and catalogs ===
- Candee, R. (1968). Housepaints in Colonial America
- Candee, R. (1985). Atlantic Heights: A World War I shipbuilder's community
- Candee, R. (1992). Building Portsmouth: The neighborhoods and architecture of New Hampshire's oldest city
- Candee, R. (2002). The artful life of Thomas P. Moses (1808–1881): "Poetry, music, painting – anything but money"
- Candee, R. (2005). The hand-cranked knitter and sock machine: A social history and catalogue of 19th and 20th century home knitters of American invention
- Candee, R. (2007). Wallace Nutting's Portsmouth: Photographs of the 'colonial' past 1908–1918
- Candee, R., & Morgan, K. (Ed.). (2009). Buildings of Massachusetts: Metropolitan Boston
- Candee, R. M. (Ed.). (2011). Maritime Portsmouth: The Sawtelle collection
- Candee, R. (2018). Sisters of the Brush & Palette." In Gertrude Fiske, American master

=== Journal articles ===
- Candee, R. (1966). Strictly for the birds. Old-Time New England, 57(1), 12-14.
- Candee, R. (1968). The rediscovery of milk-based house paints and the myth of buttermilk red. Old-Time New England, 58(3), 79-81.
- Candee, R. (1969). A documentary history of Plymouth Colony architecture. Old-Time New England, 59(2), 59-71; 59(3), 105-111; 60(2), 37-53.
- Candee, R. (1970). Millwright and merchant: Water-powered saw-milling in 17th century Maine and New Hampshire. Old-Time New England, 60(4), 131-149.
- Candee, R. (1970). The early New England textile village in art. Antiques Magazine, 910-915.
- Candee, R. (1971). Three architects in early New Hampshire mill towns. Journal of the Society of Architectural Historians.
