= Greg S. Harris =

President of the Rock and Roll Hall of Fame

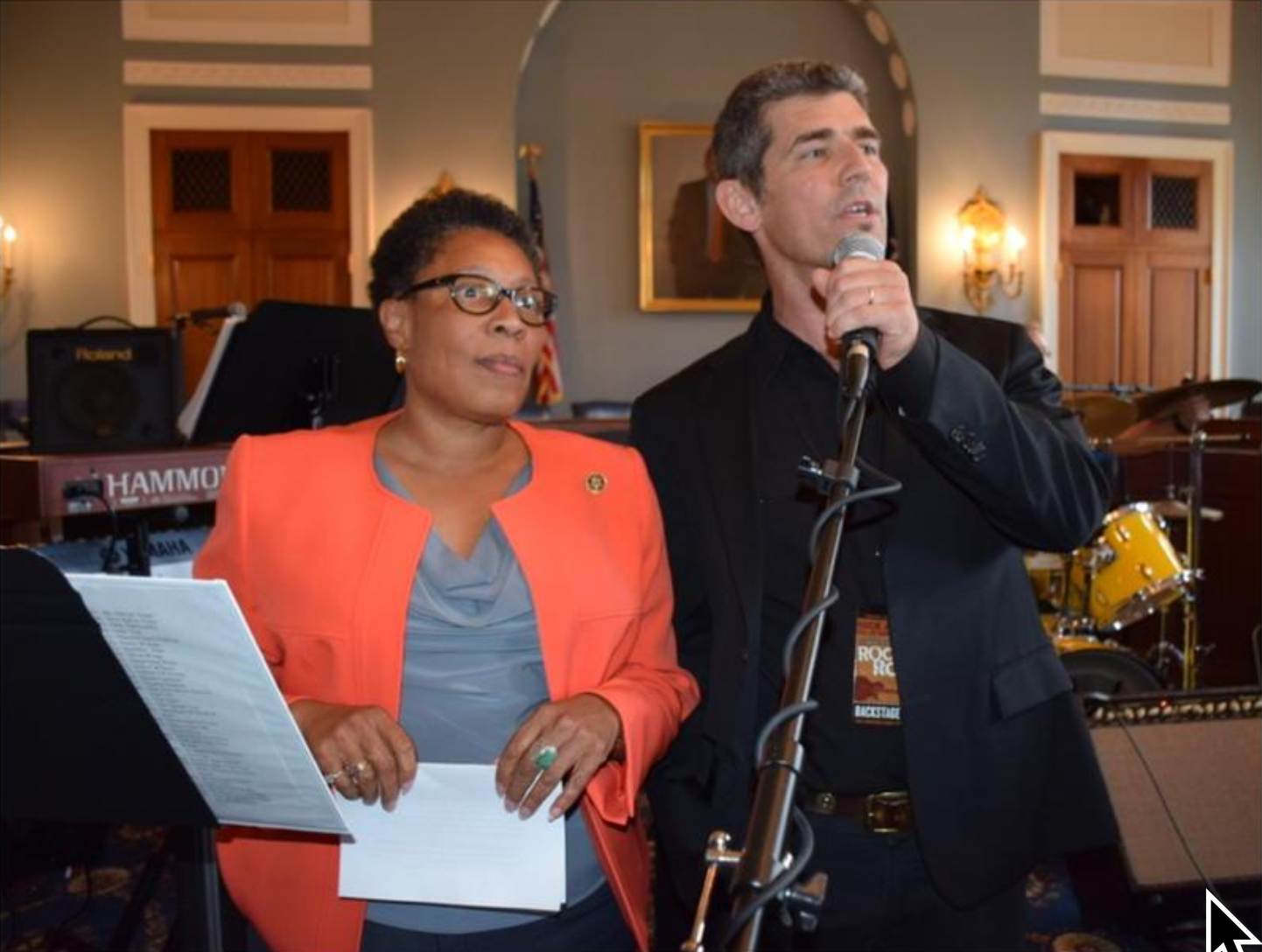
- Harris, at right, with Marcia Fudge in 2015
- Born: October 6, 1965 (age 60); West Trenton, New Jersey, U.S.
- Education: Temple University; SUNY Oneonta
- Occupation: Museum executive
- Known for: President of the Rock and Roll Hall of Fame

Gregory Scott Harris (born October 6, 1965) is an American museum executive. He is currently the president of the Rock and Roll Hall of Fame in Cleveland, Ohio.

== Biography ==
Harris was born West Trenton, New Jersey. His family moved to Morrisville, Pennsylvania, when he was 10 years old. He graduated from Temple University with a B.A. in history in 1989, and earned a Master’s in history and museum studies from the Cooperstown Graduate Program at SUNY Oneonta.

Harris was a senior executive at the National Baseball Hall of Fame and Museum for 14 years. Harris co-founded the Philadelphia Record Exchange in 1985 with Jacy Webster, a notable retail outlet which specialized in hard-to-find vinyl records. He also worked in the live music business as the road manager for Ben Vaughn.

Harris joined the Rock and Roll Hall of Fame (HOF) in 2008, starting out as vice president of development; he was named president and CEO in late 2012 and started those roles in 2013. Harris has expanded programming at the HOF, partnering with more traditional museums such as New York City's Metropolitan Museum of Art in 2019 to create a gigantic collection of musical instruments and photographs to accompany them. During the COVID-19 pandemic, the HOF expanded its educational outreach and put more of its programming on YouTube where they were able to reach hundreds of teachers daily.

Harris was instrumental in planning an expansion of the HOF scheduled to break ground in 2022.
