= John Holmes McDowell =

- Born: 1946 (age 79–80)
- Occupation: Professor

Academic background
- Education: University of Texas at Austin

Academic work
- Discipline: Anthropologist
- Sub-discipline: Folklore
- Institutions: Indiana University Bloomington

John Holmes McDowell (born 24 September 1946) is a professor in the Department of Folklore and Ethnomusicology at Indiana University Bloomington. He also serves as Director of the Diverse Environmentalisms Research Team (DERT) headquartered at Indiana University. Broadly speaking his work is centered on performance and communication as well as the interplay of creativity and tradition. Geographically most of his fieldwork has been in Mexico, Colombia, Cuba, Ecuador, and Ghana. His interests include Speech play and verbal art; the corrido of Greater Mexico; music, myth, and cosmology in the Andes; ecoperformativity; commemoration; folklorization; ethnopoetics; Latin America; the United States.

== Education ==
He graduated from Swarthmore College in Pennsylvania in 1969 with a B.A. in music. He received a Ph.D. in anthropology (Folklore) from University of Texas at Austin where his outside minor combined Folklore and Linguistics. His dissertation is titled The Speech Play and Verbal Art of Chicano Children: An Ethnographic and Sociolinguistic Study.

== Academic writing ==
He is the author of five books: Children’s Riddling (1979), Sayings of the Ancestors: The Spiritual Life of the Sibundoy Indians (1989), “So Wise Were Our Elders”: Mythic Narratives of the Kamsá (1994), based on fieldwork with an indigenous community in Colombia, Poetry and Violence: The Ballad Tradition of Mexico’s Costa Chica (2000), a study of the ballad tradition in southern coastal Mexico, and ¡Corrido! The Living Ballad of Mexico's Western Coast (2015). He was also editor or co-editor of the following books or volumes: Andean Musics. Andean Studies Occasional Papers. V.3 Center for Latin American and Caribbean Studies (1987), Andean Cosmologies through Time: Persistence and Emergence (1992), Stith Thompson’s A Folklorist’s Progress: Reflections of a Scholar’s Life (1996), Dancing the Ancestors: Carnival in South America (2001)., and Additionally he has published more than 30 articles on subjects ranging from the Mexican corrido to speech play and verbal art to Indigenous folklore of the Andes to children's folklore. He is co-editor of

== Other academic work ==
He has been involved with video documentaries and website productions related to his scholarship. With his wife Patricia Glushko he produced video documentaries “Que me troven un corrido” ("Write me a corrido") and “Brass Bands of Guerrero” addressing the music of Mexico. He also runs a website on student folklore at Indiana University. He served as editor for the Journal of Folklore Research from 1986 to 1992, editor of Special Publications of the Folklore Institute from 1990 to 1995 and 1999–2009, and the online Journal of Folklore Research Reviews from 2006–present.

== Major prizes and awards ==
- Lifetime Achievement Award. American Folklore Society, Children's Folklore Section.
- Indiana University New Frontiers in the Humanities for "Pioneer Village and Virtual Outdoor Museum Website" (2006)
- Indiana University College Arts and Humanities Institute for "Inti Raymi: Runa Festival of Cleansing and Renewal" (2006)
- Named a Fellow of the American Folklore Society (2004)
- National Endowment for the Humanities, Education Division for "Tales On-Line: An Electronic Database of Folk Narrative" (2001)
- Indiana University Intercampus Research Fund for "Hungarian-American Consciousness" (2001)
- Summer Faculty Fellowship, Indiana University (1997)
- Named John Simon Guggenheim Fellow for "Poetry and Violence on Mexico's Costa Chica" (1994)
- National Endowment for the Humanities, Interpretive Research for "Hispanic Folk Poetry in Performance" (1988–90)
- Fulbright Lectureship in Ghana, West Africa (1987–1988)
- Chicago Folklore Prize for Children's Riddling (1978–79)
- Fulbright-Hays Faculty Research Abroad Fellowship (Colombia) (1979)
