= Roger Tory Peterson Institute =

Museum and nature center in Jamestown, New York, United States

- Established: 1984
- Location: Jamestown, New York, United States
- Coordinates: 42°7′6″N 79°13′29″W
- Type: Natural history museum, art museum
- Website: rtpi.org

The Roger Tory Peterson Institute (RTPI) is a museum and nature center located in Jamestown, New York, United States. It is dedicated to advancing the public understanding of natural history through the intersection of art, science, and conservation. The institute houses the largest collection of works by naturalist and artist Roger Tory Peterson (1908–1996), including original paintings, drawings, manuscripts, and films.

Founded in 1984, the RTPI functions as both a cultural and conservation institution. It serves as a regional gateway to natural areas in western New York while aspiring to national significance as a museum of nature art and archive of scientific illustration.

== History ==
The RTPI was established in Jamestown, Peterson’s hometown, to preserve his legacy and to inspire future generations of naturalists and artists. Peterson, best known as the creator of the modern field guide, combined artistic illustration with systematic bird identification, beginning with A Field Guide to the Birds of Eastern North America (1934).

The institute opened its permanent facility in 1993, designed by Robert A.M. Stern Architects, and has since expanded its role as a museum, archive, and conservation hub.

== Mission and philosophy ==
RTPI describes itself as a "living embodiment" of Peterson’s field guide philosophy, emphasizing art as a tool to inform, inspire, and illuminate nature. Its programming is structured around five institutional pillars:

- Art Matters
- Biodiversity Matters
- People Matter
- Sanctuary Matters
- Speaking Out Matters

Although the institute states that it "takes no sides regarding politics," it commits to advocacy on behalf of nature.

== Collections and archives ==
The institute houses the most comprehensive collection of Peterson’s work, including:

- Original Artwork and Illustrations – paintings and sketches used in the creation of his field guides.
- Photographs, Films, and Slides – documenting Peterson’s international fieldwork.
- Manuscripts and Personal Papers – correspondence, drafts, and memorabilia relating to his conservation work.
- Special Collections and Equipment – rare books, research materials, and Peterson’s cameras and field equipment.

In 2021, RTPI adopted a new Code of Ethics affirming that its permanent collection would not be treated as a financial asset, aligning with American Alliance of Museums (AAM) standards as part of its accreditation process.

== Architecture ==
The RTPI’s building was designed by Robert A.M. Stern and Roger H. Seifter of Robert A.M. Stern Architects. The structure combines Arts and Crafts–inspired details with natural materials such as Engelmann spruce columns and custom copper lighting fixtures. The design has been noted for blending into its wooded surroundings, and visitors sometimes compare it to Frank Lloyd Wright–inspired architecture.

The facility includes exhibition galleries, research archives, classrooms, and the Peterson Preserve, which provides trails and outdoor education space.

== Programs and exhibitions ==
The institute hosts exhibitions under the series Art That Matters to the Planet (ATMTTP), which highlights contemporary environmental issues through artistic expression. Exhibitions frequently involve collaborations between artists, scientists, and conservation groups.

- Clarity (2024) focused on freshwater ecosystems in partnership with the Chautauqua Watershed Conservancy.
- Wild America (2025) is planned to commemorate the 70th anniversary of Peterson’s North American journey with James Fisher.

In 2023, Alex Warnick was selected as the institute’s inaugural Artist-in-Residence. Concurrent with the residency, RTPI hosted the solo exhibition Alex Warnick: The Art of Observation, which ran from March 18 to June 11, 2023.

Educational programming includes school field trips, art and nature workshops, and the Artist-in-Residence program, which supports emerging natural history artists.

== Regional and national role ==
The RTPI positions itself as a regional tourism and educational hub for western New York while pursuing national recognition as a leading institution for art and nature. Its strategic plan, RTPI Rising, outlines goals for professionalization, accreditation, and expanded conservation partnerships.

The institute works with local organizations including Jamestown Community College and the Chautauqua Watershed Conservancy to integrate conservation action with public programming.

== See also ==
- Roger Tory Peterson
- Natural history illustration
- American Alliance of Museums
- Alex Warnick
