= Gretchen Sorin =

African-American historian and museologist

Academic background
- Education: University at Albany, SUNY (PhD); Cooperstown Graduate Program (MA); Rutgers University (BA)
- Thesis: "Keep Going": African Americans on the Road in the Era of Jim Crow (2009)
- Doctoral advisor: Ann F. Withington

Academic work
- Discipline: Museum Studies, History
- Institutions: State University of New York at Oneonta

Gretchen Sullivan Sorin is a distinguished professor of museum studies and African-American history at State University of New York at Oneonta and director of the University's Cooperstown Graduate Program. She received her Bachelor of Arts from Rutgers University and Master of Arts in Museum Studies from Oneonta's Cooperstown Graduate Program before receiving her Doctorate of Philosophy in History from University at Albany, SUNY. She has also worked as a curator and exhibit designer.

Sorin is best known for her work on the history of racial discrimination faced by traveling African Americans. Her 2020 book, Driving While Black, was a finalist for the 52nd NAACP Image Award and received a Silver Gavel from the American Bar Association. Sorin directed documentary film of the same name for PBS, which received a National Endowment for the Humanities grant.

== Bibliography ==
- Driving While Black: African American Travel and the Road to Civil Rights (2020)
