= Rock and Roll Hall of Fame =

Music museum in Cleveland, Ohio, US

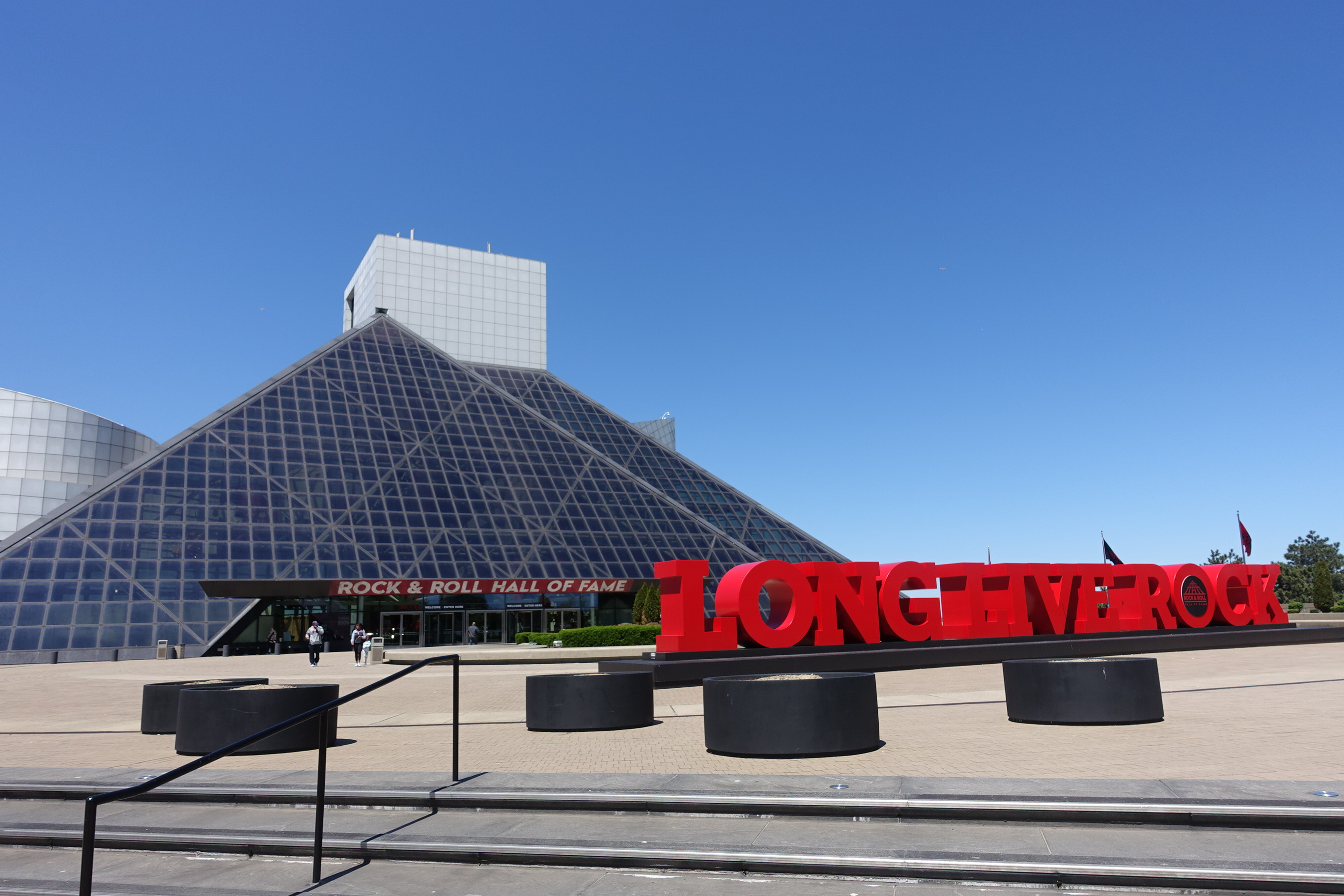
- The Rock and Roll Hall of Fame in 2017
- Established: April 20, 1983; 43 years ago Dedicated September 1, 1995
- Location: 1100 Rock and Roll Boulevard (East 9th Street at Lake Erie); Cleveland, Ohio, U.S. 44114
- Coordinates: 41°30′31″N 81°41′44″W
- Visitors: 543,000 (2016)
- President: Greg Harris
- Public transit access: East 9th–North Coast
- Website: rockhall.com

The Rock and Roll Hall of Fame (RRHOF), also simply referred to as the Rock Hall, is a museum and hall of fame located in downtown Cleveland, Ohio, United States, on the shore of Lake Erie. The museum documents the history of rock music and the artists, producers, engineers, and other personnel who have influenced its development.

The Rock and Roll Hall of Fame Foundation was established on April 20, 1983, by Ahmet Ertegun, founder and chairman of Atlantic Records. After a long search for the right city, Cleveland was chosen in 1986 as the Hall of Fame's permanent home. Architect I. M. Pei designed the new museum, and it was dedicated on September 1, 1995.

== Foundation ==
The RRHOF Foundation was established in 1983 by Ahmet Ertegun, who assembled a team that included publisher of Rolling Stone magazine Jann Wenner, record executives Seymour Stein, Bob Krasnow, and Noreen Woods, and attorneys Allen Grubman and Suzan Evans.

The Foundation began inducting artists in 1986, but the Hall of Fame still had no home. The search committee considered several cities, including Philadelphia (home to rock pioneer Bill Haley and American Bandstand); Memphis, Tennessee (home of Sun Studios and Stax Records); Detroit (home of Motown Records); Cincinnati, Ohio (home of King Records); New York City; and Cleveland.

Cleveland lobbied for the museum, with civic leaders in Cleveland pledging $65 million in public money to fund the construction, and citing that WJW disc jockey Alan Freed both coined the term "rock and roll" and heavily promoted the new genre, and that Cleveland was the location of Freed's Moondog Coronation Ball, which is often credited as the first major rock and roll concert. Freed was also a member of the hall of fame's inaugural class of inductees in 1986. In addition, Cleveland cited radio station WMMS, which played a key role in breaking several major acts in the U.S. during the 1970s and 1980s, including David Bowie, who began his first U.S. tour in the city, Bruce Springsteen, Roxy Music, and Rush, among many others.

During early discussions on where to build the Hall of Fame and Museum, the Foundation's board considered a site along the Cuyahoga River in downtown Cleveland. Ultimately, the chosen location was along East Ninth Street in downtown by Lake Erie, east of Cleveland Stadium. At one point in the planning phase, when a financing gap existed, planners proposed locating the Rock Hall in the then-vacant May Company Building but finally decided to commission architect I. M. Pei to design a new building. Initial CEO Larry R. Thompson facilitated I. M. Pei in designs for the site. Pei came up with the idea of a tower with a glass pyramid protruding from it. Pei initially planned the tower to be 200 feet (61 m) high, but was forced to reduce it to 162 feet (49 m) due to the structure's proximity to Burke Lakefront Airport. The building's base is approximately 150,000 square feet (14,000 m^{2}).

== Building ==
The groundbreaking ceremony for the building took place on June 7, 1993, with Pete Townshend, Chuck Berry, and Billy Joel in attendance.

The museum was dedicated on September 1, 1995, with the ribbon being cut by an ensemble that included Yoko Ono and Little Richard, before a crowd of more than 10,000 people. The following night, an all-star concert was held at Cleveland Stadium and featured Chuck Berry, Bob Dylan, Al Green, Jerry Lee Lewis, Aretha Franklin, Bruce Springsteen, Iggy Pop, John Fogerty, John Mellencamp, and many others.

In addition to the Hall of Fame inductees, the museum documents the entire history of rock and roll, regardless of induction status. Hall of Fame inductees are honored in a special exhibit located in a wing that juts out over Lake Erie. The exhibit space and inaugural exhibits were designed by Bruce Burdick's San Francisco design firm The Burdick Group.

Since 1986, the Rock and Roll Hall of Fame has selected new inductees. The formal induction ceremony has been held in New York City 28 times (1986–1992, 1994–1996, 1998–2008, 2010–2011, 2014, 2016, 2017, 2019, and 2023); four times in Los Angeles (1993, 2013, 2022, and 2025); and seven times in the hall of fame's home in Cleveland (1997, 2009, 2012, 2015, 2018, 2021, and 2024).

The 2009 and 2012 induction weeks were made possible by a public–private partnership between the City of Cleveland; the State of Ohio; the Rock and Roll Hall of Fame; and local foundations, corporations, civic organizations, and individuals. Collectively, these entities invested $5.8 million in 2009 and $7.9 million in 2012 to produce a week of events, including free concerts, a gospel celebration, exhibition openings, free admission to the museum, and induction ceremonies at Public Hall.

Millions viewed the television broadcast of the Cleveland inductions, and tens of thousands traveled to Ohio during induction week to participate in the events. The economic impact of the 2009 induction week activities was more than $13 million, and it provided an additional $20 million in media exposure for the region. The 2012 induction week yielded similar results.

In 2020, the Rock Hall announced plans to renovate and expand its footprint by a third. The architecture firm PAU, founded by Vishaan Chakrabarti, will lead the project.

=== Layout ===
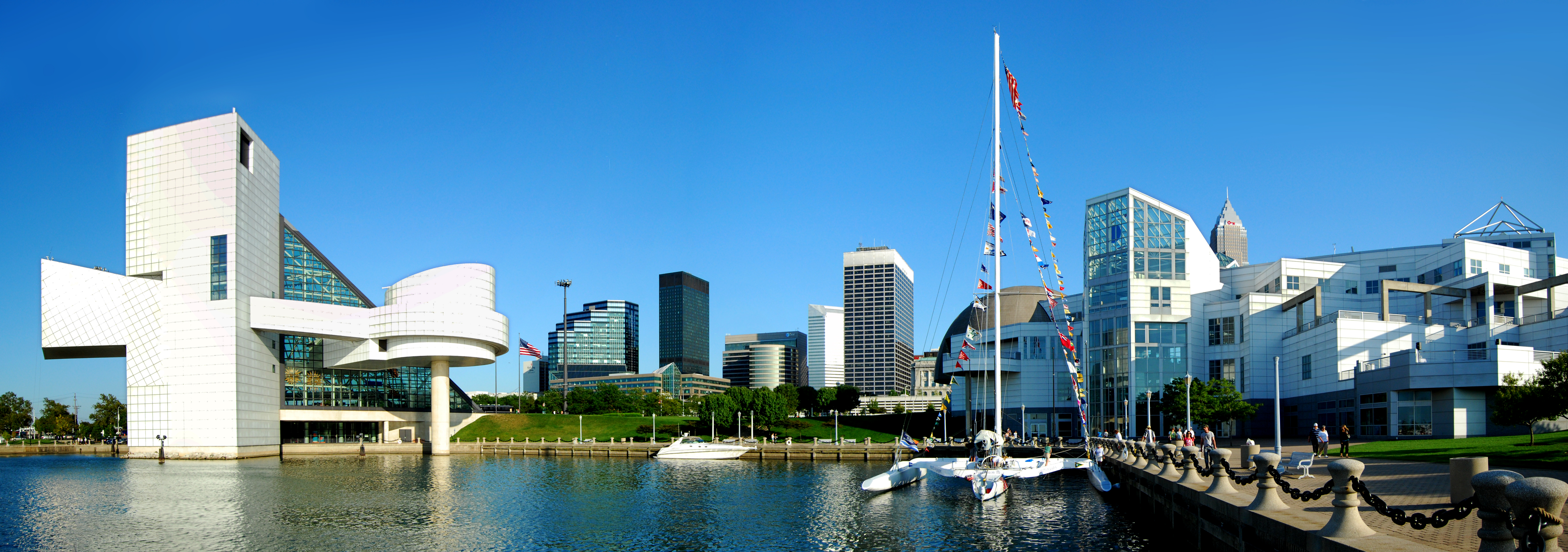
The Rock and Roll Hall of Fame (left) sits on the Lake Erie shore next to the Great Lakes Science Center (right) in Cleveland's North Coast Harbor.

The building contains seven levels. On the lower level is the Ahmet M. Ertegun Exhibition Hall, the museum's main gallery, which includes exhibits on the roots of rock and roll (gospel, blues, rhythm & blues and folk, country, and bluegrass). It also features exhibits on cities that have had a major impact on rock and roll: Memphis, Detroit, London, Liverpool, San Francisco, Los Angeles, New York, and Seattle. There are exhibits about soul music, the Fifties, Sun Records, hip-hop, Cleveland's rock and roll legacy, the music of the Midwest, rock and roll radio and dee-jays, and the many protests against rock and roll. This gallery also has exhibits that focus on individual artists, including the Beatles, the Rolling Stones, Jimi Hendrix, and others. Finally, the Ahmet M. Ertegun Exhibition Hall includes a theatre that features films on various subjects such as American Bandstand.

The first floor of the museum is the entrance level. It includes a café, a stage that the museum uses for various special performances and events throughout the year, and a section called "Backstage Stories". The second floor includes several interactive kiosks that feature programs on one-hit wonders and the Songs That Shaped Rock and Roll. This level also includes a gallery with artifact-filled exhibits about Les Paul, Alan Freed, Sam Phillips, and the evolution of audio technology.

Visitors enter the Hall of Fame section of the museum on the third floor. This section includes "The Power of Rock Experience", which includes one of Jonathan Demme's final works, a film shown in the Connor Theater. The film includes musical highlights from some of the Hall's induction ceremonies. Visitors exit the Hall of Fame section on the fourth floor. That level features the Foster Theater, a state-of-the-art 3-D theater that is used for special events and programs.

Finally, the top two levels of the Rock and Roll Hall of Fame feature large, temporary exhibits. Over the years, numerous exhibits have been installed on these two levels, including exhibits about Elvis Presley, hip-hop, the Supremes, the Who, U2, John Lennon, the Clash, the Grateful Dead, Bruce Springsteen, Women Who Rock, and the Rolling Stones.

=== Architecture ===
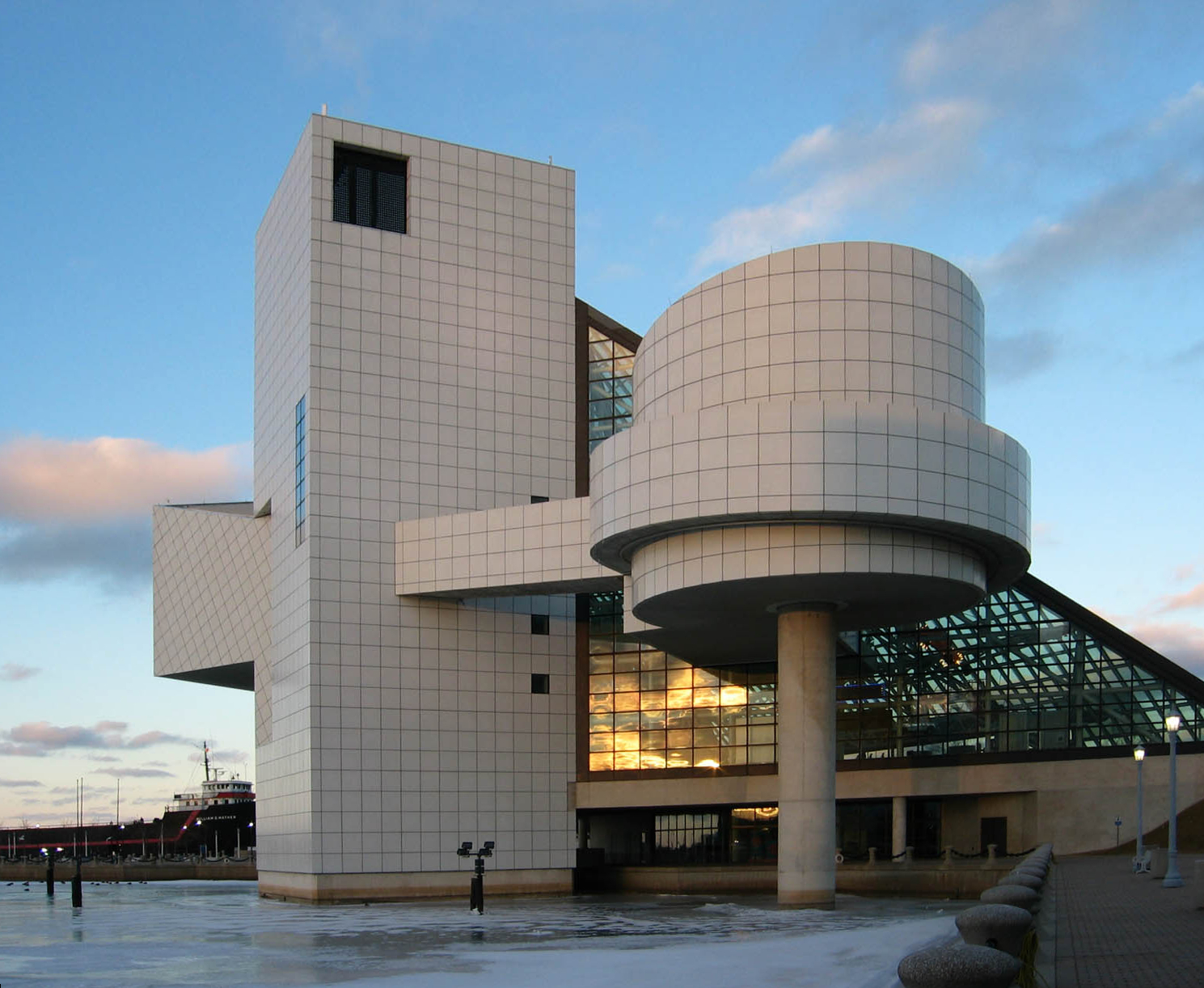
The Rock and Roll Hall of Fame, showing Lake Erie in the foreground

Designed by I. M. Pei and structurally engineered by Leslie E. Robertson Associates, the building rises above the shores of Lake Erie. It is a combination of geometric forms and cantilevered spaces that are anchored by a 162-foot (49 m) tower. The tower supports a dual-triangular-shaped glass "tent" that extends (at its base) onto a 65,000-square-foot (6,000 m^{2}) plaza that provides a main entry facade.

The building houses more than 55,000 square feet (5,100 m^{2}) of exhibition space, as well as administrative offices, a store, and a café.

"In designing this building," Pei said, "it was my intention to echo the energy of rock and roll. I have consciously used an architectural vocabulary that is bold and new, and I hope the building will become a dramatic landmark for the city of Cleveland and for fans of rock and roll around the world."

=== New York City Annex ===
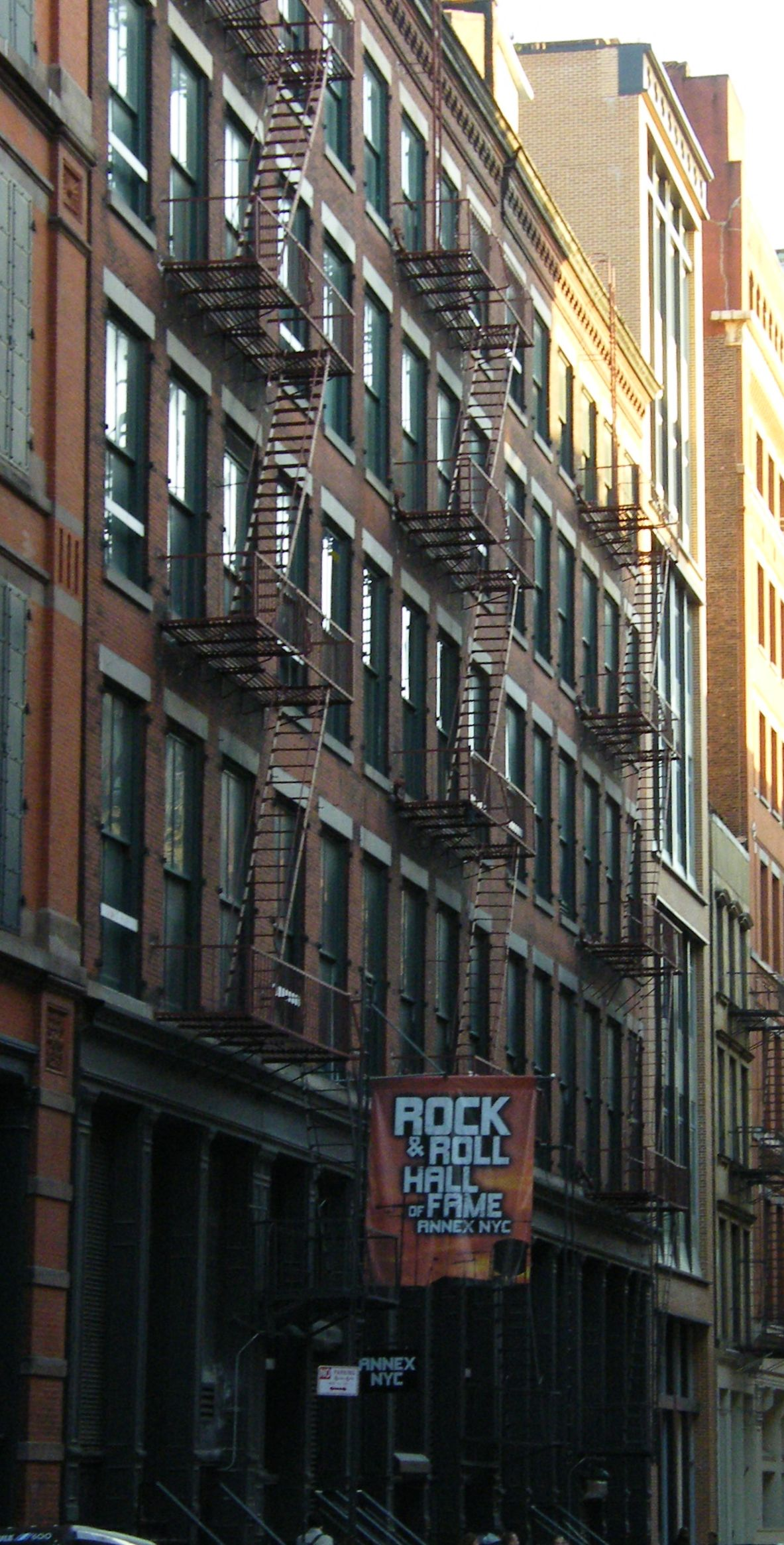
The museum's New York City Annex (2008–2010) on Mercer Street in Soho

In 2006, the RRHOF partnered with three entertainment production companies to create a branch museum in New York City. On November 18, 2008, the Rock and Roll Hall of Fame Annex NYC opened in Manhattan's SoHo district. Located at 76 Mercer Street just west of Broadway, the Annex occupied an underground space of 25,000 square feet (2,300 m^{2}). The branch museum operated in much the same way as its Cleveland parent, featuring archetypal display pieces like Prince's coat from Purple Rain, David Byrne's "big suit" from Stop Making Sense, and Elvis Presley's motorcycle jacket and Bible. But from its start, the Annex also had a distinct New York area focus that made plenty of space for big items like the phone booth from CBGB, layered thick with band stickers over the decades; Bruce Springsteen's own 1957 Chevrolet; a special gallery reserved for the city's musicians; and an intricate 26-foot (7.9 m) scale model of Manhattan highlighting sites of rock history.

Jann Wenner served as chairman of the board of the Annex. At its opening night gala, he inadvertently created a controversy after he told a reporter, "One of the small sad things is we didn't do it in New York in the first place." He later expressed regret for his remark, which he said had been misconstrued and clarified that "I am absolutely delighted that the Rock and Roll Hall of Fame and Museum is in Cleveland."

The Annex closed on January 3, 2010, its quick demise reportedly due to the 2008 financial crisis and a subsequent downturn in the city's tourism. The museum's final major exhibition was about John Lennon and his years in New York City.

== Exhibits and features ==
Since 1997, the Rock and Roll Hall of Fame has featured numerous temporary exhibits that range in size from major exhibits that fill the top two floors of the museum to smaller exhibits that are often installed in the main exhibition hall on the lower level.

The museum's first major exhibit opened on May 10, 1997. It was called I Want to Take You Higher: The Psychedelic Era, 1965–1969 and included memorabilia from numerous artists including John Lennon, Eric Clapton, John Sebastian, Jefferson Airplane, and Janis Joplin, as well as items related to the 1967 Monterey Pop Festival and 1969's Woodstock.

That exhibit was followed by Elvis Is in the Building, which ran from August 8, 1998, to September 5, 1999. This year-long tribute was the first exhibit devoted to a single artist: Elvis Presley, the "King of Rock and Roll" and the first inductee into the RRHOF in 1986. Graceland supplied a significant selection of representative artifacts for this special tribute that spanned Presley's life and career. Next, the museum curated Roots, Rhymes and Rage: The Hip-Hop Story, which was the first major museum exhibit to focus on hip-hop. It ran from November 11, 1999, to August 6, 2000. It was followed by Rock Style, an exhibit that focused on both rock and roll and fashion. It featured clothing from Buddy Holly to Alice Cooper, Ray Charles to David Bowie, and Smokey Robinson to Sly Stone. After it closed in Cleveland, Rock Style traveled to other museums in the U.S.

Other temporary exhibits have included Lennon: His Life and Work, which ran from October 20, 2000, to January 1, 2003, followed by In the Name of Love: Two Decades of U2 and Reflections: The Mary Wilson Supreme Legacy Collection. A major exhibition titled Louder than Words: Rock, Power, Politics was on display during the 2016 Republican National Convention in Cleveland.

Other large temporary exhibits have focused on the Clash (Revolution Rock: The Story of the Clash), the Doors (Break on Through: The Lasting Legacy of the Doors), the Who's Tommy (Tommy: The Amazing Journey), and Bruce Springsteen (From Asbury Park to the Promised Land: The Life and Music of Bruce Springsteen). Another thematic temporary exhibit focused on the role of women in rock and roll (Women Who Rock: Vision, Passion, Power). Many of these exhibits travel to other museums after closing in Cleveland. A major temporary exhibit in 2017 told the story and impact of Rolling Stone magazine.

The Rock and Roll Hall of Fame also curates many smaller temporary exhibits. Over the years, these exhibits have focused on such topics as the Vans Warped Tour, the Concert for Bangladesh, Woodstock's 40th and 50th anniversaries, Austin City Limits, the Monterey International Pop Festival, Roy Orbison, Motown's 50th anniversary, Tom Petty and the Heartbreakers, Marty Stuart, Paul Simon, Graham Nash, John Mellencamp, and Geddy Lee's basses.

The museum also devotes exhibits to photography and artwork related to rock and roll. Among the photographers whose work has been featured at the Hall of Fame are George Kalinsky, Alfred Wertheimer, Tommy Edwards, Kevin Mazur, Janet Macoska, Lynn Goldsmith, Linda McCartney, Mike McCartney, Robert Alford, and George Shuba. The museum also featured the artwork of Philip Burke in one of its temporary exhibits, and a later exhibit featured Herb Ritts.

The Rock and Roll Hall of Fame and Museum produces numerous public programs, including concerts, interviews, lectures, film screenings, and other events that help tell the story of rock and roll. Every February, the museum celebrates Black History Month by hosting concerts, film screenings, and lectures that illustrate the important role African-Americans have played in the history of rock and roll.

Another program is the Hall of Fame Series. This series began in April 1996 and features interviews with Hall of Fame inductees in rare and intimate settings, most often in the Museum's Foster Theater. The interviews are usually followed by a question-and-answer session with the audience and, often, a performance by the inductee.

A similar program is the Legends Series, whose only real difference from the Hall of Fame Series program is that it features artists who have not yet been inducted into the Hall of Fame. Peter Hook of Joy Division, Spinderella of Salt n Pepa, Tommy James, and the Chi-Lites are among the artists who have participated in the Legends Series.

The Rock and Roll Hall of Fame and Museum's most acclaimed program is the annual American Music Masters series. Each year, the museum celebrates one of the Hall's inductees with a week-long series of programs that includes interviews, film screenings, and, often, a special exhibit. The celebration ends with an all-star concert held at a Cleveland theater. The concerts include a diverse mix of artists—from Hall of Fame inductees to contemporary musicians.

The American Music Masters series began in 1996 with Hard Travelin': The Life and Legacy of Pete Seeger. Since then, the programs have honored the following inductees: Jimmie Rodgers (1997), Robert Johnson (1998), Louis Jordan (1999), Muddy Waters (2000), Bessie Smith (2001), Hank Williams (2002), Buddy Holly (2003), Lead Belly (2004), Sam Cooke (2005), Roy Orbison (2006), Jerry Lee Lewis (2007), Les Paul (2008), Janis Joplin (2009), Fats Domino and Dave Bartholomew (2010), Aretha Franklin (2011), Chuck Berry (2012), The Everly Brothers (2014), and Johnny Cash (2017). In 2019, the concert series's format was retooled, and the event was renamed the Rock Hall Honors, in which the honored performer is joined in concert by guests of their choice. The first Rock Hall Honors concert, featuring Mavis Staples, was performed in Cleveland in September 2019.

The Rock and Roll Hall of Fame won the 2020 Webby People's Voice Award for Cultural Institution in the category Web.

=== List of "The Songs That Shaped Rock and Roll" ===
Hall of Fame museum curator James Henke, along with "the museum's curatorial staff and numerous rock critics and music experts", created an unordered list of "500 Songs That Shaped Rock and Roll." The list is part of a permanent exhibit at the museum, and was envisioned as part of the museum from its opening in 1995. It contains songs recorded from the 1920s through the 1990s. The oldest song on the list is "Wabash Cannonball" (in particular Roy Acuff's 1936 version), written c. 1882 and credited to J. A. Roff. Since then, however, an additional 160 songs have been added, and the list is now simply referred to as "The Songs That Shaped Rock and Roll." The most recent songs on the list are Gnarls Barkley's "Crazy" and My Chemical Romance's "Welcome to the Black Parade," which were both released in 2006. The Beatles and the Rolling Stones are the most represented on the 660-song list, with eight songs each.

=== 25th anniversary concert ===
The Rock and Roll Hall of Fame celebrated its 25th anniversary with a concert series over two days on October 29 and 30, 2009, at Madison Square Garden in New York. The celebration included performances by Jerry Lee Lewis, U2, Patti Smith, Bruce Springsteen and the E Street Band, Simon & Garfunkel, Dion DiMucci, Metallica, James Taylor, Bonnie Raitt, Fergie, Mick Jagger, Lou Reed, Ray Davies, Ozzy Osbourne, Paul Simon, Jeff Beck, Buddy Guy, Aretha Franklin, Stevie Wonder, Sting, Little Anthony & the Imperials, and Crosby, Stills and Nash. The first night ran almost six hours, with Bruce Springsteen and the E Street Band closing the concert with special guests John Fogerty, Darlene Love, Tom Morello, Sam Moore, Jackson Browne, Peter Wolf, and Billy Joel.

== Inductees ==
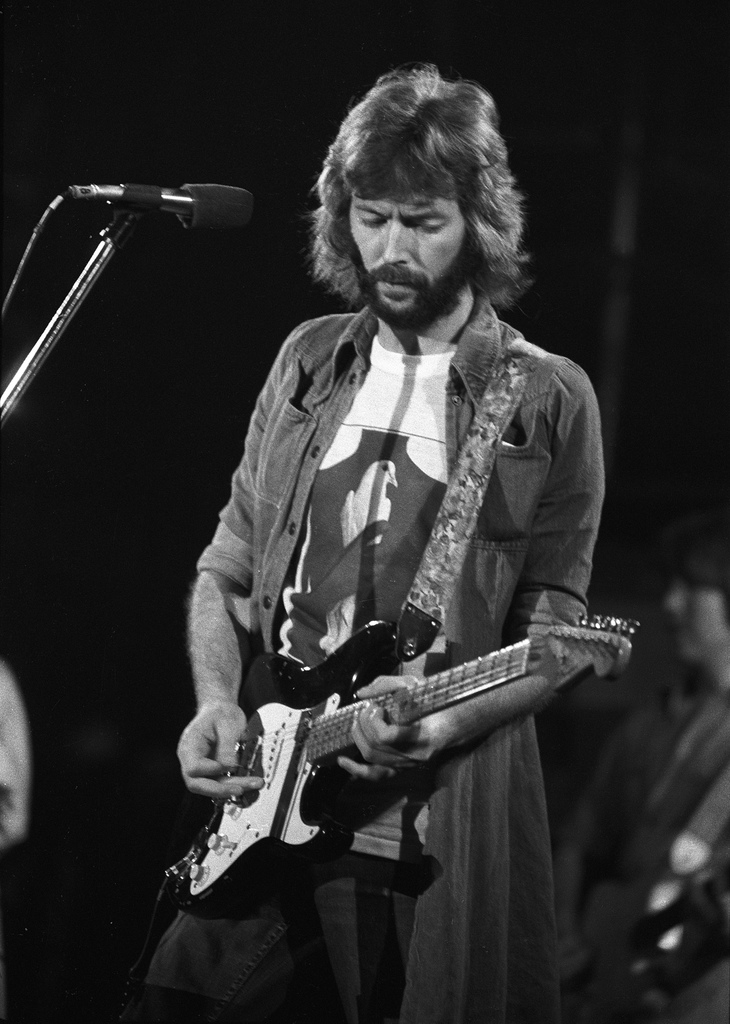
English guitarist, singer, and songwriter Eric Clapton is the only three-time inductee to the Rock and Roll Hall of Fame.

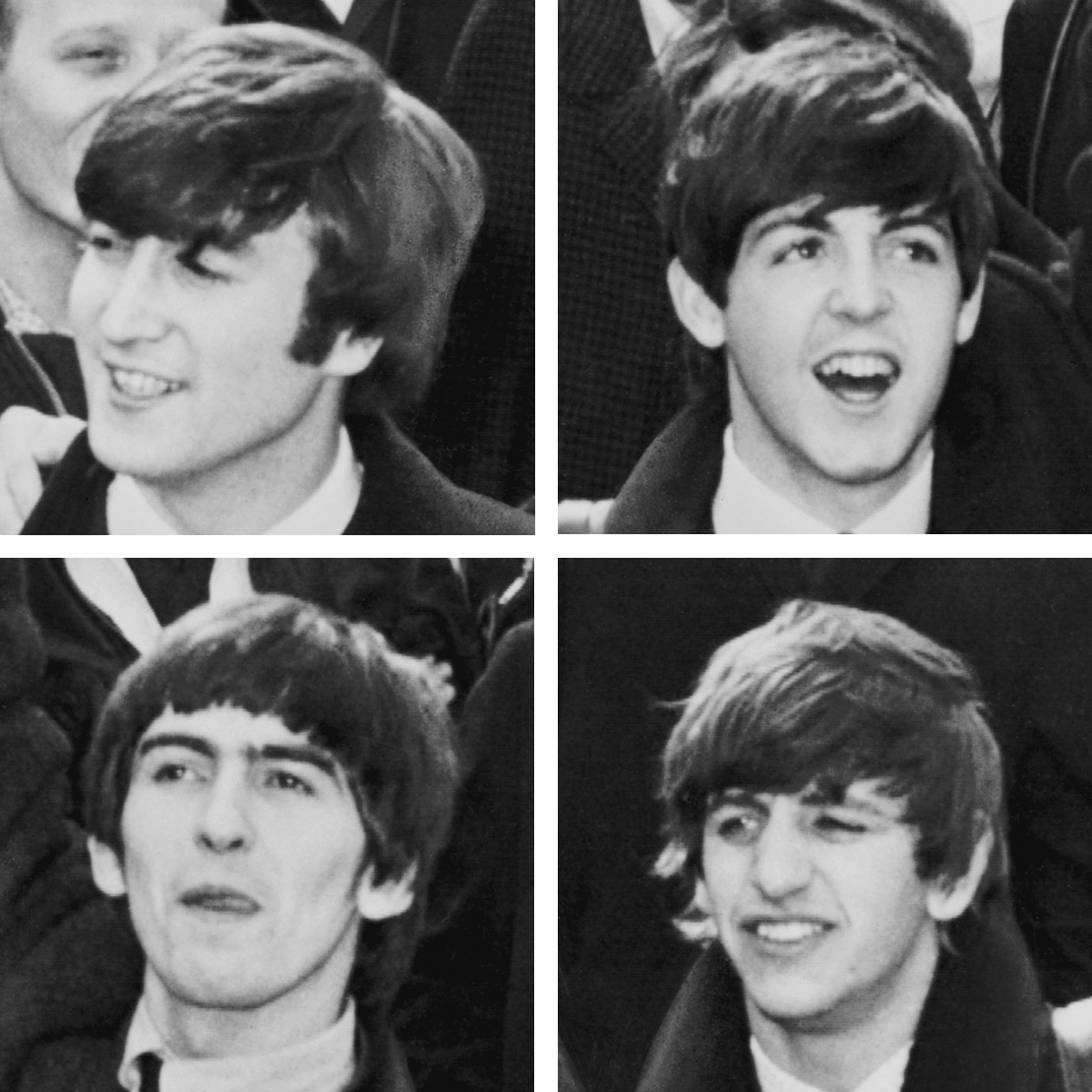
English rock group The Beatles were inducted in 1988, and all four members were later inducted as solo artists.

Artists are inducted into the Rock and Roll Hall of Fame at an annual induction ceremony. Over the years, the majority of the ceremonies had been held at the Waldorf-Astoria Hotel in New York City. However, on January 12, 1993, the ceremony was held in Los Angeles and was held there again in 2013. On May 6, 1997, about a year and a half after the opening of the Rock and Roll Hall of Fame and Museum, the ceremony was held in Cleveland. It returned to Cleveland in 2009 and again in 2012. Since then, the ceremony is held at the Hall of Fame in Cleveland every even-numbered year and either New York City or Los Angeles every odd-numbered year.

Generally, the number of inductees each year ranges from about a half-dozen to a dozen. Virtually all living inductees have attended the ceremonies, and they are usually presented with their Hall of Fame award by an artist who was influenced by that inductee's music. Both the presenter and the inductee speak at the ceremonies, which also include numerous musical performances by both the inductees and the presenters. As of February 2021, there were 338 inductees.

The first group of inductees, inducted on January 23, 1986, included Elvis Presley, James Brown, Little Richard, Fats Domino, Ray Charles, Chuck Berry, Sam Cooke, the Everly Brothers, Buddy Holly, and Jerry Lee Lewis. Robert Johnson, Jimmie Rodgers, and Jimmy Yancey were inducted as Early Influences; John Hammond received the Lifetime Achievement Award; and Alan Freed and Sam Phillips were inducted as Non-Performers.

=== Performers ===
A nominating committee composed of rock and roll historians selects names for the "Performers" category (singers, vocal groups, bands, and instrumentalists of all kinds), which are then voted on by roughly 500 experts across the world. Those selected to vote include academics, journalists, producers, and others with music industry experience. Artists become eligible for induction 25 years after the release of their first record. Criteria include the influence and significance of the artists' contributions to the development and perpetuation of rock and roll. Block approval voting is used, with those nominees who receive the most votes being inducted, subject to a minimum of 50% approval. Around five to seven performers are inducted each year.

In 2012, six additional groups—the Miracles, the Famous Flames, the Comets, the Blue Caps, the Midnighters, and the Crickets—were inducted as performers by a special committee due to the controversial exclusions when their lead singer was inducted. "There was a lot of discussion about this," said Terry Stewart, a member of the nominating committee. "There had always been conversations about why the groups weren't included when the lead singers were inducted. Very honestly, nobody could really answer that question – it was so long ago ... We decided we'd sit down as an organization and look at that. This is the result."

The three other categories, sometimes referred to as the "side categories", are considered full inductions into the Rock and Roll Hall of Fame and are selected by committees instead of the annual ballot. In 2025, Rock Hall chairman John Sykes said, "No matter what category you're in, Performer or those other three, it's the same size plaque on the wall right next to Bob Dylan, Aretha Franklin, and the Beatles. It's not a secondary award. It's equal to getting in as a performer." Some artists who are inducted through these categories, such as Warren Zevon, had previously appeared on the performers ballot. Sykes said of these decisions, "These are not also-rans. The category isn't binary, and it isn't strict. It's about any individual, whether they were artists themselves or a producer that influenced those that followed."

=== Early Influences ===
Early Influences includes artists from earlier eras—primarily country, folk, jazz, and blues—whose music inspired and influenced rock and roll artists. Other notable artists that have been inducted as Early Influences include Bill Kenny & The Ink Spots, R&B artists The Orioles, country musicians Jimmie Rodgers and Hank Williams, blues musician Howlin' Wolf, and jazz musicians Jelly Roll Morton and Louis Armstrong. In 2009, rockabilly singer Wanda Jackson was the first inductee in this category since Nat King Cole and Billie Holiday in 2000. Unlike earlier inductees in this category, Jackson's career almost entirely took place after the traditional 1955 start of the "rock era."

=== Ahmet Ertegun Award for Lifetime Achievement ===
Formerly the "Non-Performers" award, this category encompasses those who primarily work behind the scenes in the music industry, including record label executives, songwriters, record producers, disc jockeys, concert promoters, and music journalists. Following the death of the Hall of Fame's co-founder Ahmet Ertegun, this award was renamed in his honor in 2008.

=== Award for Musical Excellence ===
Formerly the "Sidemen" award, this category was introduced in 2000 and honors veteran session and concert players who are selected by a committee composed primarily of producers. The category was dormant from 2004 through 2007 and re-activated in 2008. This honor was renamed the "Award for Musical Excellence" in 2010. According to Joel Peresman, the president of the Rock and Roll Hall of Fame Foundation, "This award gives us flexibility to dive into some things and recognize some people who might not ordinarily get recognized."

== Library and archives ==
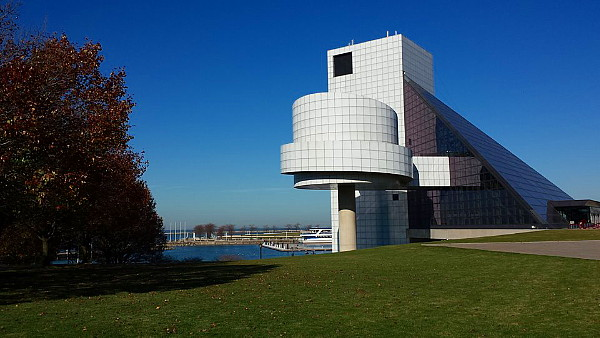
The Rock and Roll Hall of Fame in November 2015

The Rock and Roll Hall of Fame and Museum's Library and Archives is the world's most comprehensive repository of materials related to the history of rock and roll. The library and archives are located in a new building on the Metro Campus of Cuyahoga Community College in Cleveland's Campus District.

The library and archives' mission is to collect, preserve, and provide access to these materials. The library and archives operates on two levels: people may come into the library to read books and magazines, listen to music and other recordings, and watch videos and films. More serious scholars, historians, and journalists may also make an appointment for access to the archival collections under the supervision of the staff archivists.

The library is composed of books, academic dissertations, and other references. It also includes popular magazines, scholarly journals, and trade publications; commercial audio and video recordings; and research databases.

The archival collections include music-business records from record executives, artist managers, labels, historic venues, recording studios, specialists in stage design and lighting, and long-running concert tours. The collections also contain important individual items, such as personal letters penned by Aretha Franklin and Madonna, handwritten working lyrics by Jimi Hendrix and LL Cool J, papers from music journalists such as Sue Cassidy Clark, and rare concert recordings from CBGB in the 1970s.

== Criticism ==
=== Nomination process ===
A frequent criticism of the Rock and Roll Hall of Fame has been that the nomination process is controlled by a small group of individuals, most of them not musicians; this includes founders Jann Wenner and Suzan Evans, as well as writer Dave Marsh. There has also been criticism of the opacity of the selection process. Janet Morrissey of The New York Times wrote:

With fame and money at stake, it's no surprise that a lot of backstage lobbying goes on. Why any particular act is chosen in any particular year is a mystery to performers as well as outsiders, and committee members say they want to keep it that way.

The chairman of the nominating committee, Jon Landau, confirmed: "We've done a good job of keeping the proceedings nontransparent. It all dies in the room."

On March 14, 2007, two days after that year's induction ceremony, Roger Friedman of Fox News published an article that claimed the Dave Clark Five should have been the fifth inductee, as they had more votes than inductee Grandmaster Flash and the Furious Five. The article went on to say that Jann Wenner availed himself of a technicality on the day votes were due. In reality, the Dave Clark Five received six more votes than Grandmaster Flash, but Wenner thought "we couldn't go another year without a rap act". The Rock and Roll Hall of Fame Foundation responded: "There is a format and rules and procedure. There is a specific time when the votes have to be in, and then they are counted. The bands with the top five votes got in." The Dave Clark Five were subsequently nominated again and then inducted the following year.

=== Allegations of sexism and bias ===
In BBC Radio 6 Music's Annual John Peel Lecture in 2013, singer Charlotte Church accused the museum of gender bias, stating, "Out of 295 acts and artists in the Rock n' Roll Hall of Fame, 259 are entirely male, meaning that Tina Weymouth's part in Talking Heads makes them one of the 36 female acts." In 2014, the percentage of female inductees was 8.5%. Courtney Love made similar criticisms of the hall in 2023, highlighting the length of time it had taken to induct Kate Bush, Nina Simone, Carole King, Linda Ronstadt, and "most egregiously," Tina Turner as a solo artist, as well as the failure to induct Chaka Khan despite seven nominations. Following Donna Summer's death in 2012, Elton John had criticized the hall for failing to induct her during her lifetime, calling it "a total disgrace, especially when I see the second-rate talent that has been inducted." Sister Rosetta Tharpe is often regarded as the godmother of rock and roll, but was not chosen for induction until 2017.

According to author Brett Milano in 2007, "entire genres get passed over, particularly progressive rock, '60s Top 40, New Orleans funk and a whole lot of black music." At the time of Milano's comment, Pink Floyd were the only progressive rock band in the hall, although Genesis, Rush, Yes, and the Moody Blues have since been inducted. In 2022, Steven Hyden, a music critic for Uproxx and a hall voter, wrote that he believed it had been ignoring alternative rock and indie rock artists.

Some critics have pointed out a bias in favor of American and British acts, while Canadian rock bands, such as the Guess Who, are often ignored, with Neil Young, Joni Mitchell, Leonard Cohen, Rush, and the Band being the only Canadian acts in the hall. Mexican journalist Miguel Gálvez noted that no artist that performed exclusively in Spanish had ever been inducted into the hall, and advocated for the induction of artists from Latin America, including the Argentine rock band Soda Stereo.

=== Criticism from inductees ===
Members of the British punk rock band the Sex Pistols, inducted in 2006, refused to attend the ceremony, calling the museum "a piss stain" and "urine in wine". When Nile Rodgers was inducted via the Award for Musical Excellence in 2017, he described it as "wacky" that he had been inducted but his band Chic, who had been nominated eleven times, had not been inducted. In response to Oasis's nomination for the Class of 2024, Liam Gallagher disparaged the hall on X, declaring that "there's something very fishy about those awards", "it's all a load of bollox [sic]", and referring to its members as "bumbaclarts".

On his 2016 induction, Steve Miller directed a litany of complaints at the hall, both during his induction speech and especially in interviews after it. His criticisms included that there is a general lack of female inductees, there is not enough support by the hall for music education, and inductees are treated poorly at the award ceremony. At the same ceremony, Cheap Trick guitarist Rick Nielsen commented on the hall's ticket policy for inductees and their families as unnecessarily expensive, a sentiment echoed by Miller. Velvet Underground drummer Maureen Tucker has dismissed the museum as the "Hall of Lame," despite the band being inducted a few years prior to the remark.

In 2018, Bruce Dickinson of Iron Maiden called the hall "an utter and complete load of bollocks ... run by a bunch of sanctimonious bloody Americans who wouldn't know rock 'n' roll if it hit them in the face". Dickinson has also expressed an overall distaste for the hall's entity, arguing that "if you put [music] in a museum, then it's dead". Iron Maiden had been eligible for induction since 2004 and were later inducted in 2026. Hard rock and heavy metal website Blabbermouth.net observed how it had taken 15 years for Kiss to be inducted (eligible since 1999; inducted in 2014) and 23 years for Deep Purple (eligible since 1993; inducted in 2016). Regarding his band's non-induction into the hall, Judas Priest bassist Ian Hill stated in a 2019 interview, "I don't think they like heavy metal music in general."

== See also ==
- List of 200 Definitive Albums in the Rock and Roll Hall of Fame
- List of music museums
- List of Rock and Roll Hall of Fame inductees
