= Katherine Grier =

Writer and professor

Katherine C. Grier
- Other name: Kasey Grier

Academic background
- Education: University of Delaware
- Thesis: Culture and comfort : parlor making in America, 1850-1930 (1989)

Katherine C. "Kasey" Grier is an American historian and author, known for her work on the history of domestic life in the United States in the nineteenth and twentieth centuries.

== Education and career ==
She received a B.A. from Princeton University in 1975, an M.A. from the Cooperstown Graduate Program in Historical Museum Studies in 1980, and a Ph.D. in American Civilization and history from the University of Delaware in 1988. From 1991 until 1998 Grier worked at the University of Utah, and following this period she worked at the University of South Carolina. In 2008 she moved back to the University of Delaware to lead the museum studies program. As of 2022 she is professor emerita in the history department at the University of Delaware.

== Writings ==
Grier is known for her work on material culture studies. In 2010 she published Culture and Comfort: Parlor Making and Middle-Class Identity, 1850-1930 examined the furnishings in people's parlors. Her 2006 book, Pets in America: A History was a result of her investigations of people and their pets. In addition to writing about pets, Grier also developed an exhibit about pets that was presented at the Winterthur Museum, Garden and Library and toured other locations in the United States.

== Awards and honors ==
In 2007 The International Society for Anthrozoology award Grier a lifetime achievement award.
