= Louis C. Jones =

American folklorist (1908–1990)

- Born: June 28, 1908; Albany, New York
- Died: November 25, 1990 (aged 82); Haverford, Pennsylvania
- Spouse: Agnes Halsey
- Awards: Guggenheim Fellowship

Academic background
- Education: Columbia University (PhD); Hamilton College (BA)
- Thesis: The Clubs of the Georgian Rakes (1941)

Academic work
- Discipline: Museum Studies, Folklore, History
- Institutions: State University of New York at Oneonta

Louis Clark Jones (June 28, 1908 – November 25, 1990) was an American folklorist, historian, and museologist. In 1964, Jones created the Cooperstown Graduate Program, the first museum studies program in the United States, in collaboration with State University of New York at Oneonta and the New York State Historical Association. He was head of Association from 1947 until his retirement in 1972. Jones also developed a graduate level degree in American public folklore at Cooperstown, though this program was later abolished while the museum studies program remains.

In 1946, Jones received a Guggenheim Fellowship to study paranormal folklife in New York, with a focus on werewolves. His early work often focuses on the supernatural aspects of folklore, publishing works such as Things That Go Bump in the Night, and commented often on ghostlore.

Jones's work in Cooperstown aimed to include the general public and their ways of life in museological space. He died of a stroke on November 25, 1990.

== Bibliography ==
- The Clubs of the Georgian Rakes (1942)
- Spooks of the Valley: Ghost Stories for Boys and Girls (1948)
- Things That Go Bump in the Night (1959)
- Growing Up in the Cooper Country (1965)
- A Long Look Over My Left Shoulder (1965)
- Murder at Cherry Hill: The Strang–Whipple Case, 1827 (1980)
- Cooperstown (1982)
- Three Eyes on the Past: Exploring New York Folk Life (1982)
