= Laurence Thompson (sinologist) =

American sinologist

Laurence G. Thompson (1920 - July 10, 2005) was a World War II veteran, sinologist, classical violinist and professor emeritus of East Asian languages and cultures at the University of Southern California.

== Biography ==
Thompson was born in 1920 in the Shandong province of Republic of China, the son of missionaries Kenneth Kilgore Thompson and Denise Archer Thompson. His family had to leave China in 1927 during the unrest of the Northern Expedition, when they moved to Thailand, where he caught Malaria. They returned to China in 1929, and he lived there until age 14, when his father retired.

While in China, he was educated at the Chinan Foreign School and the Shanghai American School.

Back in the United States, Thompson completed high school in Southern California. In 1942, Thompson earned a bachelor's degree from UCLA.

As a young man, he joined the U.S. Marine Corps and worked as a Japanese-language interpreter. During World War II, he served in the South Pacific.

In 1947, he earned a master's degree from Claremont Graduate School. Seven years later, he earned a doctorate from Claremont. From 1951 to 1959, Thompson served in the United States Foreign Service in Taipei, Tokyo, Manila and Hong Kong. In Seoul and Taipei, he was a staff member of The Asia Foundation.

== Academic career ==
An accomplished classical violinist, Thompson taught music at National Taiwan Normal University from 1959 to 1962.

He was a Pomona College faculty member from 1962 to 1965, and a USC faculty member from 1965 to 1986. At USC, he served as chair of the department of East Asian languages and cultures from 1968 to 1970, and from 1972 to 1976. From 1972 to 1974, he became the founding director of USC East Asian Studies Center.

== Research ==
Thompson's first major publication was a translation of Kang Youwei's "Da Tong Shu," (Ta T'ung Shu) in 1958. His main intellectual commitment was to his pioneering studies of Chinese religion.

He wrote Chinese Religion: An Introduction,. which went through 5 editions, and that Paper (2012) called "The best introductory study" of Chinese religion, and The Chinese Way in Religion.

His three-volume bibliographical work Chinese Religions: Publications in Western Languages (1970) is a basic resource to the field, which he continued to update in retirement in 1990.

He authored the article on Chinese religion for Encyclopædia Britannica, 15th edition. Also, he served as president of the Society for the Study of Chinese Religions for nine years, and in 1992 was honored with a festschrift in the Journal of Chinese Religions. In addition, Thompson translated several volumes of religious studies by Wu Yaoyu and documents on Taiwanese studies.
