= Larry R. Thompson =

Larry R. Thompson (born 1947) is the president of Ringling College of Art and Design in Sarasota, Florida. Starting in 2007 with the Ulla Searing Student Center, he intended to rebuild all of Ringling College to be 5 stories tall. Thompson was CEO of the Rock and Roll Hall of Fame and helped architect I. M. Pei realize the site design. He also ran the Flint Cultural Center before joining Ringling College. Thompson's retirement as president of Ringling College after the 2025-2026 academic school year was announced on April 17, 2025.
