= Sue Cassidy Clark =

American music journalist

- Born: May 15, 1935 (age 91); Milwaukee, Wisconsin, US
- Occupations: Author, music journalist

Sue Cassidy Clark (born May 15, 1935) is an American music journalist and photographer who specialized in soul, gospel, and rock music in the late 1960s and early 1970s. Many of the individuals with whom Clark conducted interviews were musical pioneers, and the period in which the interviews took place was a time when American popular music was evolving rapidly. Over the course of her life, Clark has interviewed many notable musicians, including Jerry Butler, Jerry Wexler, Creedence Clearwater Revival, The Doors, Aretha Franklin, Dizzy Gillespie, The Grateful Dead, Al Green, Isaac Hayes, Jimi Hendrix, The Isley Brothers, Etta James, Jefferson Airplane, B. B. King, Gladys Knight, Patti LaBelle, Little Richard, Curtis Mayfield, The O'Jays, Wilson Pickett, Otis Redding, Martha Reeves, Smokey Robinson, the Rolling Stones, Nina Simone, Sly Stone, Chaka Khan, David Ruffin, and Tina Turner.

== Publications ==
Clark authored Rock: A World Bold as Love in 1970 and The Superstars: In Their Own Words in 1972.

She spent most of her time conductive interviews and writing record reviews for major music publications. Clark's work appeared in many magazines, including Billboard, Black Stars, Creem, Hit Parader, Rolling Stone, Rock, Soul Illustrated, and Soul Sounds, Manchete (Brazil).

== Archival collections ==
Sue Cassidy Clark's papers exist in two repositories:

Columbia College Chicago's Center for Black Music Research - Sue Cassidy Clark Papers, 1948–1999 (Bulk 1968–1979) This collection includes Clark's recorded interviews, interview transcripts, photographs, published articles, correspondence, handwritten notes, clippings, promotional print material, and commercial sound recordings related mostly to Soul, Gospel and R&B.

The Rock and Roll Hall of Fame and Museum - Sue Cassidy Clark Collection, 1966-1974 This collection focuses on artists in the San Francisco psychedelic rock scene as well as prominent rock bands of that era. The Collection is composed mainly of interviews Clark conducted on audiocassettes and their transcripts. Also included in the Collection is biographical research and clippings related to the artists about whom Clark was interviewing and writing, as well as flyers, pamphlets, clippings, and sheet music for bands and artists performing in and around the San Francisco Bay area.
