= Alex Warnick =

American naturalist and painter (born 1987)

- Born: Alex Clark Warnick; September 1987 (age 38); New York, U.S.
- Education: B.A. Integrated Studio Art, Brigham Young University–Idaho
- Known for: Painting, Scientific illustration, Ornithology
- Movement: Contemporary Natural History Art
- Awards: Donald and Virginia Eckelberry Endowment (2016)
- Website: alexwarnick.com

Alex Clark Warnick (born September 1987) is an American naturalist and scientific illustrator, specializing in avifauna (birds), and a painter. She describes herself as a "natural history artist" and aims to use her artwork to foster appreciation and conservation action for the natural world, stating that she hopes her work will "introduce many others to the significance and beauty of birds so that birds can benefit the lives of people, and in turn, people can benefit the lives of birds."

== Early life and education ==
Warnick grew up in Indiana and began painting and studying birds at a young age. She has said, "Birds have always been my mild obsession. In 5th grade, I delivered my career project on ornithology sitting in a giant nest I'd built from willow sticks. I held a pair of binoculars in my sixth grade yearbook picture."

She graduated with a degree in Integrated Studio Art from Brigham Young University–Idaho.

== Career ==
Warnick's work is characterized by the integration of scientific accuracy with an aesthetic inspired by historical natural history artists. Her signature style is defined by illustrating "all things crested, spotted, and gilded," a reference to terms found in bird nomenclature. She works in various media, including acrylic, watercolor, gouache, and oil. Her illustrations have been published on the covers of specialist ornithological magazines, including Bird Watcher's Digest and the Birder's Guide (published by the American Birding Association).

Her paintings have been featured in numerous art shows, exhibits, and art websites.

A profile in Audubon described her as "the Indiana-based artist (who was born in the same town as Roger Tory Peterson) [who] melds vintage styles drawn from Mark Catesby and Jacques Barraband with modern precision, crafting each project around hours of sketching outdoors."

She frequently exhibits alongside her identical twin sister, Shae Warnick, who is also an established artist and naturalist. Warnick conducts public workshops, hosted by groups such as Artists for Climate Awareness and The Nature Artists Guild.

=== Major commissions and conservation projects ===
In 2016, Warnick was awarded the Donald and Virginia Eckelberry Endowment from the Academy of Natural Sciences of Drexel University, funding research on the island of Hispaniola to illustrate 31 endemic bird species.

She served as the Natural History Artist for the book Alas & Colores (Wings & Colors), published by INICIA, which documents Hispaniola's endemic birds with text from biologists and her illustrations.

In 2019, Warnick collaborated with the Indiana Arts Commission and the Indiana State Museum to create the traveling exhibit The Artist-Naturalist, celebrating the work and legacy of Indiana author and naturalist Gene Stratton-Porter. She created a series of fifteen watercolors, each inspired by Porter's writings, which were exhibited at the Limberlost State Historic Site and the Gene Stratton-Porter State Historic Site from June to December 2019.

She has also collaborated with BirdsCaribbean, lending her artwork for use on conference merchandise to support regional conservation efforts.

=== Roger Tory Peterson Institute Residency ===
In 2023, Warnick was selected as the inaugural Artist-in-Residence at the Roger Tory Peterson Institute (RTPI). Concurrent with the residency, RTPI hosted the solo exhibition Alex Warnick: The Art of Observation, which ran from March 18 to June 11, 2023.
