= Richard Dorson =

American folklorist (1916–1981)

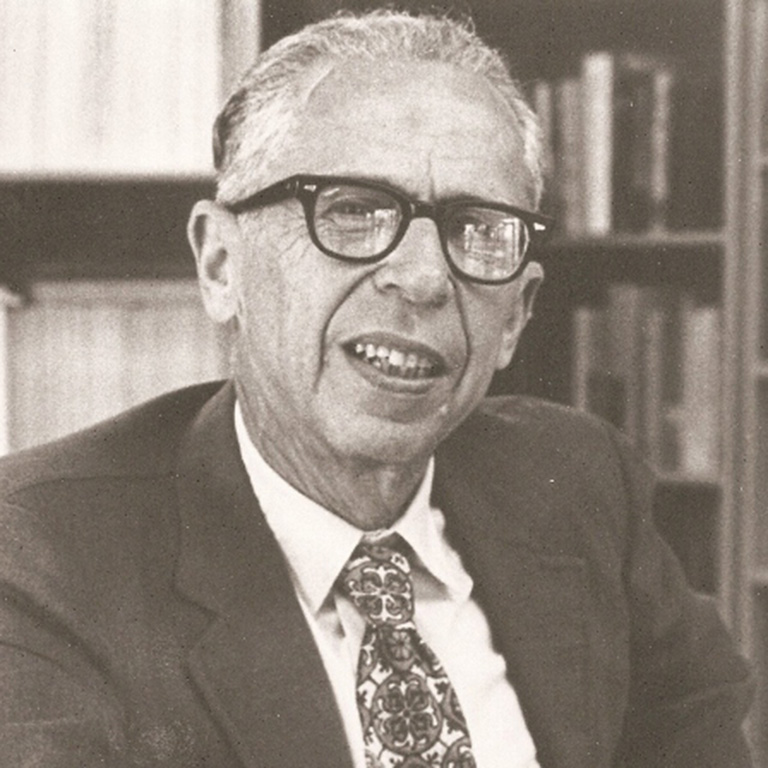
- Richard M. Dorson
- Born: March 12, 1916; New York City, New York
- Died: September 11, 1981 (aged 65); Indianapolis, Indiana
- Education: Harvard University (BA, MA, PhD)
- Occupations: Folklorist, professor, director
- Known for: Study of folklore

Richard Mercer Dorson (March 12, 1916 – September 11, 1981) was an American folklorist, professor, and director of the Folklore Institute at Indiana University. Dorson has been called the "father of American folklore" and "the dominant force in the study of folklore".

== Career ==
Dorson was born in New York City into a wealthy Jewish family. He studied at the Phillips Exeter Academy from 1929 to 1933.

He then went on to Harvard University where he earned his A.B., M.A., in history, and his Ph.D. degree in the History of American Civilization in 1942. He began teaching as an instructor of history at Harvard in 1943. He moved to Michigan State University in 1944 staying there until 1957 when he took a position at Indiana University as professor of history and folklore as well as that of chairman of the Committee on Folklore. He taught at Indiana until his death. He brought the eminent folklorist Linda Dégh to Bloomington, who revolutionized American folklore research. He was the general editor of the "Folktales of the World" (1963–1973), a multivolume series published by the University of Chicago Press. He served an advisory editor of the series "International Folklore" (48 vols., 1977), as well as the series editor of "Folklore of the World" (38 vols., 1980). In addition, he contributed articles to numerous scholarly and popular periodicals. From 1957 to 1962 he edited the Journal of Folklore Research. He was elected president of the American Folklore Society, 1966 to 1968. In addition, he was the founder and editor of the journal of the Folklore Institute (1963–1981) at Indiana.

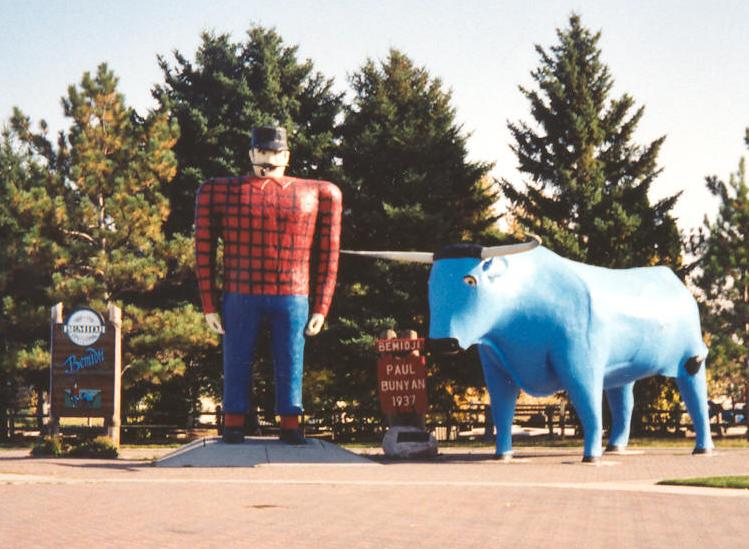
Dorson criticized the commercialization of folk traditions, specifically that of Paul Bunyan.

Dorson's study of American folklore involved several roles; "polemicist, critic, field collector, library scholar". Dorson also wrote that "no subject of study in the United States today [1976] is more misunderstood than folklore".

== Contributions to folklore ==
Dorson contributed two terms to the study of folklore that have gained common currency. The first is "urban legend"; meaning a modern "story which never happened told for true". Dorson also coined the word "fakelore" in a debate with author James Stevens. Dorson dismissed Stevens' book on Paul Bunyan, and the later work of Ben Botkin as fakelore, or "a synthetic product claiming to be authentic oral tradition but actually tailored for mass edification", which "misled and gulled the public". Dorson's fieldwork touched upon African-American folklore in Michigan, folklore of the Upper Peninsula, other regional folklore in the United States, the folklore of Japan, and other topics. Among other academic recognitions, Dorson was awarded the Library of Congress award in History of American Civilization in 1946, and three Guggenheim Fellowships (1949, 1964, and 1971). In 2003, the Michigan Traditional Arts Program of the Michigan State University Museum awarded him the Michigan Heritage Award posthumously for his Michigan-based fieldwork contributions.

According to Anne Keene, at Indiana:

Dorson gained international recognition as the dean of American folklife studies and was credited with transforming folklore from a field of tangential interest to a scholarly discipline in its own right. He was an intense and prodigious researcher and writer with seemingly boundless energy, devoted to the study of what he termed “the underculture, in contrast with the elite, the uppercrust, the official, the formal culture.” Dorson viewed himself, first and foremost, as a historian, and he was suspicious of attempts by other disciplines—anthropology, sociology, and psychology, among others—to co-opt folk culture for their own theoretical purposes. Folklore, he argued, was firmly rooted in human history and should be studied empirically as a means of expanding knowledge of that history; to that end, he repeatedly emphasized the necessity for the accurate collection and documentation of folk materials. At a time when quasi-legendary American folk heroes like Davy Crockett and Paul Bunyan were increasingly being popularized and commercialized by the mass media, Dorson placed himself squarely in opposition to what he termed “fakelore,” what might be called the Disneyfication of folk traditions; he dismissed anything he suspected of being less than genuine. That attitude extended to the so-called folk-music revival of the mid-twentieth century—to the mock dismay of many of his guitar-picking students.

According to William Wilson:

Dorson, in much the same manner as European romantic-nationalistic folklorists, set himself the patriotic task of discovering and making known the genius of his country's national spirit. Throughout his research career, Dorson moved freely across space and time--from the United States and England to Africa and Japan, from the religious narratives of the Puritans to the urban legends of college students, from international folktales of the world to the personal experience narratives of Indiana steelworkers. But from his early writings on Davy Crockett and Brother Jonathan to his final book on fabulous men and beasts in American comic legends, the work which clearly seemed closest to his heart was the romantic-nationalistic attempt to discover in American folklore those traits and sentiments that are peculiarly and uniquely American.

== Bibliography ==
Dorson's papers are held at the Lilly Library of Indiana University. Audio recordings from his fieldwork can be found at the Archives of Traditional Music at Indiana University. In addition to his several books, Dorson also edited the Folktales of the World series, published between 1963 and 1979 by the University of Chicago Press.

- 1939: Davy Crocket, American Comic Legend
- 1946: Jonathan Draws the Long Bow
- 1950: America Begins
- 1952: Bloodstoppers and Bearwalkers (reprinted by the University of Wisconsin Press in 2008)
- 1953: American Rebels: Personal narratives of the American Revolution
- 1956: Negro Folktales in Michigan
- 1958: Negro Folktales from Pine Bluff, Arkansas, and Calvin, Michigan
- 1959: American Folklore
- 1961: American Folklore and the Historian
- 1961: Folk Legends of Japan
- 1961: Folklore Research Around the World: A North American Point of View
- 1964: Buying the Wind: Regional Folklore in the United States
- 1967: American Negro Folktales
- 1968: Peasant Customs and Savage Myths: Selections from the British Folklorists
- 1969: British Folklorists: A History
- 1971: American Folklore and the Historian
- 1972: African Folklore
- 1972: Folklore and Folklife: An Introduction
- 1973: America in Legend
- 1973: Folklore and Traditional History
- 1974: Folklore in the Modern World
- 1976: Folklore and Fakelore: Essays toward a Discipline of Folk Studies
- 1981: Land of the Millrats
- 1983: Handbook of American Folklore
