= Richard Bauman =

American folklorist and anthropologist

Richard Bauman is a folklorist and anthropologist, now retired from Indiana University Bloomington. He is Distinguished Professor emeritus of Folklore, of Anthropology, and of Communication and Culture. Before coming to IU in 1985, he was the Director of the Center for Intercultural Studies in Folklore and Ethnomusicology (now known as the Américo Paredes Center for Cultural Studies) at the University of Texas and a faculty member in the UT Department of Anthropology. Just before retiring from Indiana, he was chair of the IU Department of Folklore and Ethnomusicology, as well as an important member of the Department of Anthropology and the Department of Communication and Culture.

Bauman earned a B.A. with honors and distinction in English from the University of Michigan. He then earned an M.A. in folklore in 1962 at Indiana University, working closely with W. Edson Richmond and MacEdward Leach, a University of Pennsylvania folklorist then visiting Indiana University. He next went to the Penn, where he received both the M.S. in Anthropology and the Ph.D. in American Civilization in 1968. At Penn he studied with the folklorist and linguistic anthropologist Dell Hymes, Anthony F. C. Wallace, a prominent historical and psychological anthropologist, and the historian Lee Benson.

He has been influential in a number of different fields, from performance studies, linguistic anthropology, and Quaker studies to semiotics, the history of anthropology and folkloristics. He wrote Let Your Words Be Few, one of the earliest works on language ideology. This book inspired other scholars to begin exploring how people's ideas about how language functions shapes their linguistic practices. More recently, he has co-written a book with Charles L. Briggs Voices of Modernity: Language Ideologies and the Politics of Inequality. In this book, Bauman and Briggs explore the language ideologies present in the work of Locke and Herder, among others, asking what assumptions about language shaped some of the most important philosophical work of the Enlightenment. Bauman and Briggs won the Edward Sapir Prize for this book from the Society for Linguistic Anthropology in November 2006.

Bauman has been a Guggenheim Fellow, a Fellow of the Center for Advanced Study in the Behavioral Sciences, Folklore Fellow of the Finnish Academy of Sciences, and twice holder of National Endowment for the Humanities Fellowships. He is a Fellow of the American Folklore Society and in 2008 he was awarded the AFS Lifetime Scholarly Achievement Award. In 2016 he was awarded the Franz Boas Award for Exemplary Service to Anthropology.

In addition to Charles L. Briggs, his numerous scholarly collaborators include Roger D. Abrahams, Joel Sherzer, Américo Paredes, and his wife, the folklorist and anthropologist Beverly J. Stoeltje.

== Representative publications ==
- Richard Bauman (1977) "Verbal Art as Performance". Prospect Heights: Waveland Press.
- Richard Bauman (1983) "Let Your Words Be Few: Symbolism and Silence among Seventeenth Century Quakers". New York: Cambridge University Press.
- Richard Bauman (1986) "Story, Performance, and Event: Contextual Studies of Oral Narrative". New York: Cambridge University Press.
- Richard Bauman and Charles L. Briggs (1990) "Poetics and Performance as Critical Perspectives on Language and Social Life." Annual Review of Anthropology. 19:59-88.
- Charles L. Briggs and Richard Bauman (1992) "Genre, Intertextuality, and Social Power." Journal of Linguistic Anthropology. 2(2):131-72.
- Richard Bauman, ed. Folklore, Cultural Performances, and Popular Entertainments: A Communications-Centered Handbook. New York: Oxford University Press.
- 2003. Voices of modernity: Language Ideologies and the Politics of Inequality. Cambridge: Cambridge University Press.
- Richard Bauman and Charles L. Briggs (2003) Voices of Modernity: Language Ideologies and the Politics of Inequality. New York: Cambridge University Press.
- Richard Bauman (2004) A World of Others' Words: Cross-Cultural Perspectives on Intertextuality. Malden, MA: Blackwell Publishing.
- Richard Bauman (2018) "Others’ Words, Others’ Voices: The Making of a Linguistic Anthropologist", Annual Review of Anthropology 47: 1–16.
- Richard Bauman (2023) "A Most Valuable Medium: The Remediation of Oral Performance on Early Commercial Recordings". Bloomington: Indiana University Press.
