= Beverly J. Stoeltje =

American folklorist

Beverly J. Stoeltje is an emeritus professor in both the Department of Folklore and Ethnomusicology and the Department of Anthropology at Indiana University Bloomington. She also serves as Affiliated Faculty in African Studies, American Studies, Cultural Studies, Gender Studies, and at the Russian-East European Institute. Stoelje has been described as one of the "official foremothers of feminist folkloristics".

== Biography ==
Stoeltje earned her B.S. in Education in 1961, from the University of Texas, Austin. She remained at the University of Texas for her M.A. (1973) and her Ph.D. (1979) in Folklore (Folkloristics) within the graduate folklore program of the UT Department of Anthropology, and continued to teach there before joining Indiana University Bloomington in 1986.

Stoeltje's dissertation and early work was focused on the American West and, in particular, on her home state of Texas. She is known as a student of rodeo and associated forms of cultural performance. In 1978, she conducted a series of workshops at the Amon Carter Museum of Western Art, designed to "find people who are rooted in their own folk cultures and are interested in preserving folk traditions."

Stoeltje's later research continued to focus on her initial interests in performance, ritual, and gender; in 1990 she spent a year in Ghana funded by the Fulbright Program, and subsequently shifted her geographical interests to Ghana and West Africa, exploring the role of Asante Queen Mothers (see Akan Chieftaincy). She also expanded her inquiries to include the anthropologies of law and nationalism.

She was interviewed by Rebecca Tannenbaum in 2011 for the "Scholars of feminism" oral history program of University of Wisconsin–Madison. Stoeltje retired in 2019, when panels entitled "With a Riata in Her Hand: Honoring the Scholarship of Beverly Stoeltje" were organized at meetings of the American Folklore Society and the American Anthropological Association.

== Reception ==
Stoelje is described in the Encyclopedia of Women's Folklore and Folklife as one of the "official foremothers of feminist folkloristics". Sara L. Spurgeon discusses her work in the context of the American "myth of the frontier". Olaf Hoerschelmann discusses her work on ritual and festival in a modern society, originally formulated in response to rodeo, in the context of American televised quiz shows, and Jiva Nath Lamsal applies this work to the rituals surrounding death in the Nepalese Gaijatra festival.

== Selected publications ==
Books

- Stoeltje, Beverly (1979). Children's Handclaps: Informal Learning in Play. Austin: Southwest Educational Development Laboratory.
- Stoeltje, Beverly, Colleen Ballerino Cohen, and Richard Wilk, eds. (1995). Beauty Queens on the Global Stage: Gender, Contests and Power. New York: Routledge.

Research articles

- Stoeltje, Beverly J. (1975). "A Helpmate for Man Indeed": The Image of the Frontier Woman. The Journal of American Folklore 88 (347): 25–41 JSTOR 539183
- Stoeltje, Beverly J. (1993). Power and the Ritual Genres: American Rodeo. Western Folklore 52 (2/4): 135–156 JSTOR 1500083
- Stoeltje, Beverly J. (1997). Asante queen mothers: A study in female authority. Annals of the New York Academy of Sciences 810 (1): 41–71 doi:10.1111/j.1749-6632.1997.tb48124.x
