= Journal of Folklore Research =

- Discipline: Folklore, ethnomusicology
- Language: English
- Edited by: Solimar Otero

Publication details
- Former name(s): Hoosier Folklore Bulletin, Hoosier Folklore, Midwest Folklore, Journal of the Folklore Institute
- History: 1942–present
- Publisher: Indiana University Press for the Department of Folklore and Ethnomusicology at Indiana University Bloomington (United States)
- Frequency: Triannually
- Impact factor: 0.33 (2013)

Standard abbreviations
- ISO 4: J. Folk. Res.

Indexing
- ISSN: 0737-7037 (print); 1543-0413 (web)
- LCCN: 84640704
- JSTOR: 07377037
- OCLC no.: 643631447

Links
- Journal homepage; Journal page at Project MUSE

The Journal of Folklore Research: An International Journal of Folklore and Ethnomusicology is a triannual peer-reviewed academic journal covering research on folklore, folklife, and ethnomusicology. It was established in 1942 and is published by Indiana University Press.

== History ==
The journal was established in 1942 as the Hoosier Folklore Bulletin and continued in 1945 as Hoosier Folklore. It was renamed in 1951 as Midwest Folklore (ISSN 0544-0750) and continued from 1964 to 1983 under Richard Dorson as the Journal of the Folklore Institute (ISSN 0015-5934), obtaining its current name in 1984. Since July 2002, the journal has been published and distributed by the Indiana University Press.

The journal is run by the Department of Folklore and Ethnomusicology at Indiana University Bloomington. Following Richard Dorson, the following persons have been editors-in-chief of the journal: Mary Ellen Brown, John Holmes McDowell, Moira Marsh, Judah Cohen, Jason Baird Jackson, Michael Foster, and Ray Cashman.

== Abstracting and indexing ==
The journal is abstracted and indexed in the MLA Bibliography, Humanities Abstracts, EBSCO databases, Arts and Humanities Citation Index, Current Contents/Arts & Humanities, Social Sciences Citation Index, International Bibliography of the Social Sciences, Humanities Index, and ProQuest.
