= Handbook of North American Indians =

Series by the Smithsonian Institution

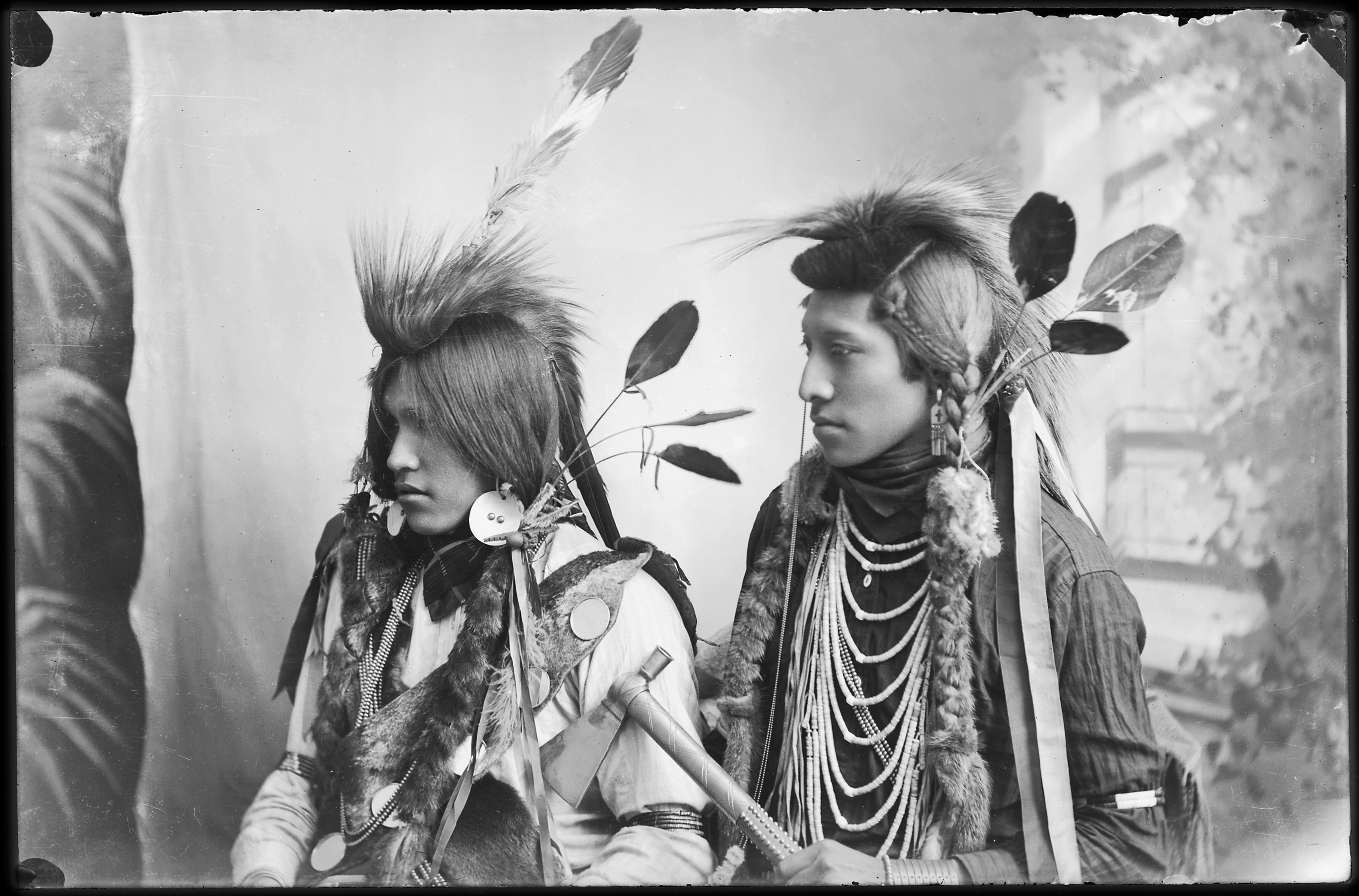
Photograph of Native Americans from Southeastern Idaho taken from the Handbook of North American Indians

The Handbook of North American Indians is a series of edited scholarly and reference volumes in Native American studies, published by the Smithsonian Institution beginning in 1978. Planning for the handbook series began in the late 1960s and work was initiated following a special congressional appropriation in fiscal year 1971. To date, 16 volumes have been published. Each volume addresses a subtopic of Americanist research and contains a number of articles or chapters by individual specialists in the field coordinated and edited by a volume editor. The overall series of 20 volumes is planned and coordinated by a general or series editor. Until the series was suspended, mainly due to lack of funds, the series editor was William C. Sturtevant, who died in 2007.

This work documents information about all Indigenous peoples of the Americas north of Mexico, including cultural and physical aspects of the people, language family, history, and worldviews. This series is a reference work for historians, anthropologists, other scholars, and the general reader. The series utilized noted authorities for each topic. The set is illustrated, indexed, and has extensive bibliographies. Volumes may be purchased individually.

== Bibliographic information ==
Handbook of North American Indians / William C. Sturtevant, General Editor. Washington, DC : Smithsonian Institution: For sale by the U.S. Government Printing Office, Superintendent of Documents., 1978–.

== Volume 1: Introduction ==
Krupnik, Igor (2022), Introduction, Washington, D.C.: Smithsonian Institution, p. 931, ISBN 978-1-944466-53-4, https://doi.org/10.5479/si.21262173

- Introduction: A Gateway to the Handbook Series. Igor Krupnik. Pages 1–9.
- Antecedents of the Smithsonian Handbook Project: 1800s–1965. Igor Krupnik. Pages 10–30.

Native American Histories in the Twenty-First Century

- Writing American Indian Histories in the Twenty-First Century. Donald L. Fixico. Pages 31–43.
- Codes of Ethics: Anthropology's Relations with American Indians. Joe Watkins. Pages 44–56.
- Indigenous North Americans and Archaeology. George Nicholas, Dorothy Lippert, and Stephen Loring. Pages 57–74.
- Cultural Heritage Laws and Their Impact. Eric Hollinger, Lauren Sieg, William Billeck, Jacquetta Swift, and Terry Snowball. Pages 75–89.
- Emergence of Cultural Diversity: Long-Distance Interactions and Cultural Complexity in Native North America. J. Daniel Rodgers and William W. Fitzhugh. Pages 90–103.
- Coastal Peoples and Maritime Adaptations: From First Settlement to Contact. Torben C. Rick and Todd J. Braje. Pages 104–118.

New Cultural Domains

- Indigenous Peoples, Museums, and Anthropology. Aron L. Crowell. Pages 119–135.
- "A New Dream Museum": 100 Years of the (National) Museum of the American Indian, 1916–2016. Ann McMullen. Pages 136–150.
- Access to Native Collections in Museums and Archives: History, Context, and Future Directions. Hannah Turner and Candace Green. Pages 151–164.
- Emergent Digital Networks: Museum Collections and Indigenous Knowledge in the Digital Era. Aaron Glass and Kate Hennessy. Pages 165–181.
- 3D Digital Replication: Emerging Cultural Domain for Native American Communities. Eric Hollinger. Pages 182–195.
- Social Media: Extending the Boundaries of Indian Country. Loriene Roy, Marisa Elena Duarte, Christina M. Gonzalez, and Wendy Peters. Pages 196–210.
- Digital Domains for Native American Languages. Gary Holton. Pages 211–229.

Native American Experiences in the Twenty-First Century

- Food Sovereignty. Elizabeth Hoover. Pages 230–246.
- Native American Communities and Climate Change. Margaret Hiza Redsteer, Igor Krupnik, and Julie K. Maldonado. Pages 247–264.
- Native American Languages at the Threshold of the New Millennium. Marianne Mithun. Pages 265–277.
- Immigrant Indigenous Communities: Indigenous Latino Populations in the United States. Gabriela Pérez Báez, Cynthia Vidaurri, and José Barreiro. Pages 278–292.
- Contestation from Invisibility: Indigenous Peoples as a Permanent Part of the World Order. Duane Champagne. Pages 293–303.

Transitions in Native North American Research

- Arctic. Peter Collings. Pages 304–319.
- Subarctic: Accommodation and Resistance since 1970. Collin Scott, William E. Simeone, Robert Wishart, and Janelle Baker. Pages 320–337.
- Northwest Coast: Ethnology since the Late 1980s. Sergei Kan and Michael Harkin. Pages 338–354.
- California. Ira Jacknis, Carolyn Smith, Olivia Chilcote. Pages 355–371.
- Greater Southwest: Introduction. Igor Krupnik. Page 373.
- Southwest-1. Gwyneira Isaac, Klinton Burgio-Ericson, Chip Colwell, T.J. Ferguson, Jane Hill, Debra Martin, and Ofelia Zepeda. Pages 374–389.
- Southwest-2: Non-Pueblo and Northern Mexico. Maurice Crandall, Moises Gonzales, Sergei Kan, Enrique R. Lamadrid, Kimberly Jenkins Marshall, and José Luis Moctezuma Zamarrón. Pages 390–410.
- Great Basin. Catherine S. Fowler, David Rhode, Angus Quinlan, and Darla Garey-Sage. Pages 411–427.
- Plateau: Trends in Ethnocultural Research from the 1990s. David W. Dinwoodie. Pages 428–444.
- Plains: Research since 2000. Sebastian Felix Braun. Pages 445–460.
- Southeast. Robbie Ethridge, Jessica Blanchard, and Mary Linn. Pages 461–479.
- Northeast: Research since 1978. Kathleen J. Bragdon and Larry Nesper. Pages 480–498.

The Smithsonian Handbook Project, 1965–2008

- Section Introduction. Igor Krupnik. Page 499.
- The Beginnings, 1965–1971. Adrianna Link and Igor Krupnik. Pages 500–515.
- William Curtis Sturtevant, General Editor. William L. Merrill. Pages 516–530.
- Production of the Handbook, 1970–2008: An Insider's View. Joanna Cohan Scherer. Pages 531–548.
- Organization and Operation: Perspectives from 1993. Christian Carstensen. Pages 549–560.
- The Handbook: A Retrospective. Ira Jacknis, William L. Merril, and Joanna Cohan Scherer. Pages 561–581.

End Matter

- Contributors. Pages 583–586.
- Reviewers (December 22, 2020). Pages 587–588.
- Tributes. Pages 589–593.
- Appendix 1: Smithsonian Handbook Project Timeline, 1964–2014. Igor Krupnik, and Joanna Cohan Scherer with additions by Jan Danek and William L. Merrill. Pages 596–609.
- Appendix 2: Handbook Series Production and Editorial Staff, 1969–2022. Pages 610–612.
- Appendix 3: Conventions on Tribal and Ethnic Names in Volume 1. Igor Krupnik, with additions by Daniel G. Cole, Ives Goddard, Cesare Marino, Larry Nesper, and Joe Watkins. Pages 613–616.
- Bibliography. Pages 617–867.
- Index. Pages 869–931.

== Volume 2: Indians in Contemporary Society ==
Bailey, Garrick A. (2008), Indians In Contemporary Society, Washington, D.C.: Smithsonian Institution, p. 577, ISBN 978-0-16-080388-8

- Introduction. Garrick A. Bailey. Pages 1–9.

The Issues in the United States

- Indians in the Military. Pamela Bennett and Tom Holm. Pages 10–18.
- Termination and Relocation. Larry W. Burt. Pages 19–27.
- Indian Land Claims. Judith Royster. Pages 28–37.
- Activism, 1950–1980. Vine Deloria, Jr. Pages 38–44.
- Activism Since 1980. Robert Warrior. Pages 45–54.
- The Federal–Tribe Relationship. Alex Tallchief Skibine. Pages 55–65.
- The State–Tribe Relationship. Carole Goldberg. Pages 66–75.
- Tribal Government in the United States. Sharon O'Brien. Pages 76–85.
- The Bureau of Indian Affairs and Reservations. Angelique EagleWoman (Wambdi A. WasteWin). Pages 86–96.
- Health and Health Issues in the United States. Jennie R. Joe. Pages 97–105.
- Restoration of Terminated Tribes. George Roth. Pages 106–112.
- Recognition. George Roth. Pages 113–128.
- Tribal Sovereignty and Economic Development. Taylor Keen and Angelique EagleWoman (Wambdi A. WasteWin). Pages 129–139.
- Alaska Native Corporations. Rosita Worl. Pages 140–147.
- Gaming. Jessica R. Cattelino. Pages 148–156.

The Issues in Canada

- Native Rights and the Constitution in Canada. John J. Borrows. Pages 157–165.
- Native Rights Case Law. Kent McNeil. Pages 166–176.
- Aboriginal Land Claims. Shin Imai. Pages 177–184.
- Native Governments and Organizations. Yale D. Belanger. Pages 185–196.
- The Evolution of Native Reserves. Yale D. Belanger, David R. Newhouse, and Heather Y. Shpuniarsky. Pages 197–207.
- The Department of Indian Affairs and Northern Development. John F. Leslie. Pages 208–221.
- Health and Health Care in Canada. James B. Waldram. Pages 222–230.
- Aboriginal Economic Development. Carl Beal. Pages 231–245.
- Nunavut. Kirt Ejesiak. Pages 246–251.
- James Bay Cree. Colin H. Scott. Pages 252–260.
- Nisga'a. Margaret Seguin Anderson. Pages 261–268.

Demographic and Ethnic Issues

- United States Native Population. Russell Thornton. Pages 269–274.
- The Freedmen. Circe Sturm and Kristy J. Feldhousen-Giles. Pages 275–284.
- Native Populations of Canada. C. Vivian O'Donnell. Pages 285–293.
- Métis. Joe Sawchuk. Pages 294–301.
- Native American Identity in Law. Eva Marie Garroutte. Pages 302–307.

Social and Cultural Revitalization

- Urban Communities. Joan Weibel-Orlando. Pages 308–316.
- The Native American Church. Daniel C. Swan. Pages 317–326.
- Powwows. Thomas W. Kavanagh. Pages 327–337.
- Native Museums and Cultural Centers. Lisa J. Watt and Brian L. Laurie-Beaumont. Pages 338–350.
- Languages and Language Programs. Leanne Hinton. Pages 351–364.
- News Media. Dan Agent. Pages 365–372.
- Theater. Hanay Geiogamah. Pages 373–380.
- Film. Mark Anthony Rolo. Pages 381–391.
- Literature. Kathryn W. Shanley. Pages 392–401.
- Tribal Colleges and Universities. Wayne J. Stein. Pages 402–411.
- Native American Studies Programs. Clara Sue Kidwell. Pages 412–420.
- Lawyers and Law Programs. Rennard Strickland & M. Sharon Blackwell. Pages 421–426.
- Repatriation. C. Timothy McKeown. Pages 427–437.
- The Global Indigenous Movement. Ronald Niezen. Pages 438–445.

== Volume 3: Environment, Origins, and Population ==
Ubelaker, Douglas H. (2006), Environment, Origins, and Population, Washington, D.C.: Smithsonian Institution, pp. 1, 146, ISBN 978-0-16-077511-6

- Introduction. Douglas H. Ubelaker. Pages 1–3.
- Native Views of Origins. JoAllyn Archambault. Pages 4–15.

Paleo-Indian

- Paleo-Indian: Introduction. Dennis Stanford. Pages 16–22.
- Geoarcheology of the Plains, Southwest, and Great Lakes. Vance T. Holliday & Rolfe D. Mandel. Pages 23–46.
- Geological Framework and Glaciation of the Western Area. Christopher L. Hill. Pages 47–60.
- Climate and Biota of Western North America. Russell William Graham. Pages 61–66.
- Geological Framework and Glaciation of the Central Area. Christopher L. Hill. Pages 67–80.
- Geological Framework and Glaciation of the Eastern Area. Christopher L. Hill. Pages 81–98.
- Climate and Biota of Eastern North America. Herbert E. Wright, Jr. Pages 99–109.
- History of Research on the Paleo-Indian. David J. Meltzer. Pages 110–128.
- Paleo-Indian: Far Northwest. E. James Dixon. Pages 129–147.
- Paleo-Indian: Plains and Southwest. Bruce B. Huckell & W. James Judge. Pages 148–170.
- Paleo-Indian: East. Bradley T. Lepper & Robert E. Funk. Pages 171–193.
- Paleo-Indian: West. C. Melvin Aikens. Pages 194–207.
- Late Pleistocene Faunal Extinctions. Donald K. Grayson. Pages 208–218.

Plant and Animal Resources

- Plant and Animal Resources: Introduction. Bruce D. Smith. Pages 219–221.
- Arctic and Subarctic Plants. Alestine Andre, Amanda Karst, & Nancy J. Turner. Pages 222–235.
- Arctic and Subarctic Animals. Christyann M. Darwent & Laura L. Smith. Pages 236–250.
- Northwest Coast and Plateau Plants. Nancy J. Turner & Fiona Hamersley-Chambers. Pages 251–262.
- Northwest Coast and Plateau Animals. Virginia L. Butler & Sarah K. Campbell. Pages 263–273.
- California Plants. Robert L. Bettinger & Eric Wohlgemuth. Pages 274–283.
- California Animals. William R. Hildebrandt & Kimberly Carpenter. Pages 284–291.
- Southwest Plants. Karen R. Adams & Suzanne K. Fish. Pages 292–312.
- Southwest Animals. Steven R. James. Pages 313–330.
- Great Basin Plants. Catherine S. Fowler & David E. Rhode. Pages 331–350.
- Great Basin Animals. Joel C. Janetski. Pages 351–364.
- Plains Plants. Mary J. Adair. Pages 365–374.
- Plains Animals. John R. Bozell, Carl R. Falk, & Eileen Johnson. Pages 375–387.
- Southeast Plants. Kristen J. Gremillion. Pages 388–395.
- Southeast Animals. Heather A. Lapham. Pages 396–404.
- Northeast Plants. Gary W. Crawford. Pages 405–411.
- Northeast Animals. Bonnie W. Styles. Pages 412–427.
- Domestication of Plants in the East. C. Margaret Scarry & Richard A. Yarnell. Pages 428–436.
- Introduction and Diffusion of Crops from Mexico. Gayle J. Fritz. Pages 437–446.
- Tobacco. Volney H. Jones & Sandra L. Dunavan. Pages 447–451.
- Dog. Lynn M. Snyder & Jennifer A. Leonard. Pages 452–462.
- The Role of the Turkey in the Southwest. Natalie D. Munro. Pages 463–470.
- Introduction and Adoption of Crops from Europe. Lee A. Newsom & Deborah Ann Trieu. Pages 471–484.
- Introduction and Adoption of Animals from Europe. Barnet Pavao-Zuckerman & Elizabeth J. Reitz. Pages 485–491.

Skeletal Biology and Population Size

- Skeletal Biology and Population Size: Introduction. Douglas H. Ubelaker. Pages 492–496.
- History of Craniometric Studies, The View in 1975. W.W. Howells. Pages 497–503.
- History of Research in Skeletal Biology. Jane Buikstra. Pages 504–523.
- Skeletal Biology: Arctic and Subarctic. Anne Keenleyside. Pages 524–531.
- Skeletal Biology: Northwest Coast and Plateau. Jerome S. Cybulski. Pages 532–547.
- Skeletal Biology: California. Phillip L. Walker. Pages 548–556.
- Skeletal Biology: Southwest. Ann L.W. Stodder. Pages 557–580.
- Skeletal Biology: Great Basin. Clark Spencer Larsen & Brian E. Hemphill. Pages 581–589.
- Skeletal Biology: Northern Mexico and Texas. Lee Meadows Jantz, Nicholas P. Herrmann, Richard L. Jantz, & Douglas H. Ubelaker. Pages 590–594.
- Skeletal Biology: Plains. Laura L. Scheiber. Pages 595–609.
- Skeletal Biology: Southeast. Clark Spencer Larsen. Pages 610–621.
- Skeletal Biology: Great Lakes Area. M. Anne Katzenberg. Pages 622–629.
- Skeletal Biology: Northeast. George R. Milner & Jane Buikstra. Pages 630–639.
- Population Inferences from Bone Chemistry. Margaret J. Schoeninger. Pages 640–644.
- Dentition. G. Richard Scott & Christy G. Turner. Pages 645–660.
- Paleopathology. Donald J. Ortner & Mary Lucas Powell. Pages 661–678.
- Craniometric Affinities and Early Skeletal Evidence for Origins. Russell Nelson, Noriko Seguchi, & C. Loring Brace. Pages 679–684.
- Environmental Influences on Skeletal Morphology. Christopher Ruff. Pages 685–693.
- Population Size, Contact to Nadir. Douglas H. Ubelaker. Pages 694–701.
- Population Size, Nadir to 2000. C. Matthew Snipp. Pages 702–710.

Human Biology

- Human Biology: Introduction. Emőke J.E. Szathmáry. Pages 711–726.
- Growth and Development. Lawrence M. Schell, Mia V. Gallo, & Francis E. Johnston. Pages 727–739.
- Acclimatization and Adaptation: Responses to Cold. Michael A. Little and A.T. Steegman Jr. Pages 740–747.
- Acclimatization and Adaptation: Responses to Heat. Joel M. Hanna and Donald M. Austin. Pages 748–753.
- Albinism. Charles M. Woolf. Pages 754–761.
- Blood Groups, Immunoglobulins, and Genetic Variation. Dennis H. O'Rourke. Pages 762–776.
- Anthropometry. Richard L. Jantz. Pages 777–788.
- Health and Disease. Kue Young. Pages 789–798.
- Admixture. Jeffrey C. Long. Pages 799–807.
- Dermatoglyphics. Robert J. Meier. Pages 808–816.
- Mitochondrial DNA. D. Andrew Merriwether. Pages 817–830.
- Y Chromosomes. Tatiana M. Karafet, Stephen L. Zegura, & Michael F. Hammer. Pages 831–839.
- Ancient DNA. Anne C. Stone. Pages 840–847.

== Volume 4: History of Indian–White relations ==
Washburn, Wilcomb E. (1988), History of Indian–White Relations, Washington, D.C.: Smithsonian Institution, p. 852, ISBN 978-0-16-004583-7

- Introduction. Wilcomb E. Washburn. Pages 1–4.

National Policies

- British Indian Policies to 1783. Wilbur R. Jacobs. Pages 5–12.
- Dutch and Swedish Indian Policies. Francis Jennings. Pages 13–19.
- French Indian Policies. Mason Wade. Pages 20–28.
- United States Indian Policies, 1776–1815. Reginald Horsman. Pages 29–39.
- United States Indian Policies, 1815–1860. Francis Paul Prucha. Pages 40–50.
- United States Indian Policies, 1860–1900. William T. Hagan. Pages 51–65.
- United States Indian Policies, 1900–1980. Lawrence C. Kelly. Pages 66–80.
- Canadian Indian Policies. Robert J. Surtees. Pages 81–95.
- Spanish Indian Policies. Charles Gibson. Pages 96–102.
- Mexican Indian Policies. Edward H. Spicer. Pages 103–109.
- Danish Greenland Policies. Finn Gad. Pages 110–118.
- Russian and Soviet Eskimo Indian Policies. Richard A. Pierce. Pages 119–127.

Military Situation

- Colonial Indian Wars. Douglas E. Leach. Pages 128–143.
- Indian–United States Military Situation, 1775–1848. John K. Mahon. Pages 144–162.
- Indian–United States Military Situation, 1848–1891. Robert M. Utley. Pages 163–184.

Political Relations

- British Colonial Indian Treaties. Dorothy V. Jones. Pages 185–194.
- United States Indian Treaties and Agreements. Robert M. Kvasnicka. Pages 195–201.
- Canadian Indian Treaties. Robert J. Surtees. Pages 202–210.
- Indian Land Transfers. Arrell M. Gibson. Pages 211–229.
- The Legal Status of American Indians. Lawrence R. Baca. Pages 230–237.
- Presents and Delegations. Francis Paul Prucha. Pages 238–244.
- Colonial Government Agencies. Yasuhide Kawashima. Pages 245–254.
- Nineteenth-Century United States Government Agencies. Donald J. Berthrong. Pages 255–263.
- Twentieth-century United States Government Agencies. Philleo Nash. Pages 264–275.
- Government Indian Agencies in Canada. Douglas Sanders. Pages 276–283.
- American Indian Education. Margaret Connell Szasz & Carmelita S. Ryan. Pages 284–300.
- Indian Rights Movement Until 1887. Robert W. Mardock. Pages 301–304.
- Indian Rights Movement, 1887–1973. Hazel Whitman Hertzberg. Pages 305–323.

Economic Relations

- The Fur Trade in the Colonial Northeast. William J. Eccles. Pages 324–334.
- The Hudson's Bay Company and Native People. Arthur J. Ray. Pages 335–350.
- Indian Trade in the Trans-Mississippi West to 1870. William R. Swagerty. Pages 351–374.
- The Maritime Trade of the North Pacific Coast. James R. Gibson. Pages 375–390.
- Economic Relations in the Southeast Until 1783. Daniel H. Usner, Jr. Pages 391–395.
- Trade Goods. E.S. Lohse. Pages 396–403.
- Indian Servitude in the Northeast. Yasuhide Kawashima. Pages 404–406.
- Indian Servitude in the Southeast. Peter H. Wood. Pages 407–409.
- Indian Servitude in the Southwest. Albert H Schroeder & Omer C. Stewart. Pages 410–413.
- Indian Servitude in California. Robert F. Heizer. Pages 414–416.
- Ecological Change and Indian–White Relations. William Cronon & Richard White. Pages 417–429.

Religious Relations

- Protestant Churches and the Indians. R. Pierce Beaver. Pages 430–458.
- Mormon Missions to the Indians. John A. Price. Pages 459–463.
- Roman Catholic Missions in New France. Lucien Campeau. Pages 464–471.
- Roman Catholic Missions in California and the Southwest. Sherburne F. Cook & Cesare R. Marino. Pages 472–480.
- Roman Catholic Missions in the Southeast and the Northeast. Clifford M. Lewis. Pages 481–493.
- Roman Catholic Missions in the Northwest. Robert I. Burns. Pages 494–500.
- Roman Catholic Missions in the Arctic. Louis-Jacques Dorais & Bernard Saladin d'Anglure. Pages 501–505.
- The Russian Orthodox Church in Alaska. Sergei Kan. Pages 506–521.

Conceptual Relations

- White Conceptions of Indians. Robert F. Berkhofer, Jr. Pages 522–547.
- Relations Between Indians and Anthropologists. Nancy O. Lurie. Pages 548–556.
- The Indian Hobbyist Movement in North America. William K. Powers. Pages 557–561.
- The Indian Hobbyist Movement in Europe. Colin F. Taylor. Pages 562–569.
- Indians and the Counterculture, 1960s–1970s. Stewart Brand. Pages 570–572.
- The Indian in Literature in English. Leslie A. Fiedler. Pages 573–581.
- The Indian in Non-English Literature. Christian F. Feest. Pages 582–586.
- The Indian in Popular American Culture. Rayna D. Green. Pages 587–606.
- The Indian in the Movies. Michael T. Marsden and Jack G. Nachbar. Pages 607–616

=== Non-Indian Biographies ===
- Brief biographical sketches of 294 individuals who were not Indians but had a significant impact on the history of Indian–White relations in North America. Pages 617–699.

== Volume 5: Arctic ==
Damas, David (1984), Arctic, Washington, D.C.: Smithsonian Institution, p. 845, ISBN 978-0-16-004580-6

- Introduction. David Damas. Pages 1–7.
- History of Research Before 1945. Henry B. Collins. Pages 8–16.
- History of Archeology After 1945. Elmer Harp, Jr. Pages 17–22.
- History of Ethnology After 1945. Charles C. Hughes. Pages 23–26.
- Physical Environment. John K. Stager & Robert J. McSkimming. Pages 27–35.
- Arctic Ecosystems. Milton M.R. Freeman. Pages 36–48.
- Eskimo and Aleut Languages. Anthony C. Woodbury. Pages 49–63.
- Human Biology of the Arctic. Emőke J.E. Szathmary. Pages 64–71.
- Prehistory: Summary. Don E. Dumond. Pages 72–79.

Western Arctic

- Prehistory of North Alaska. Douglas D. Anderson. Pages 80–93.
- Prehistory of the Bering Sea Region. Don E. Dumond. Pages 94–105.
- Prehistory of the Asian Eskimo Zone. Robert E. Ackerman. Pages 106–118.
- Prehistory of the Aleutian Region. Allen P. McCartney. Pages 119–135.
- Prehistory of the Pacific Eskimo Region. Donald W. Clark. Pages 136–148.
- Exploration and Contact History of Western Alaska. James W. VanStone. Pages 149–160.
- Aleut. Margaret Lantis. Pages 161–184.
- Pacific Eskimo: Historical Ethnography. Donald W. Clark. Pages 185–197.
- Contemporary Pacific Eskimo. Nancy Yaw Davis. Pages 198–204.
- Southwest Alaska Eskimo: Introduction. James W. VanStone. Pages 205–208.
- Nunivak Eskimo. Margaret Lantis. Pages 209–223.
- Mainland Southwest Alaska Eskimo. James W. VanStone. Pages 224–242.
- Asiatic Eskimo: Introduction. Charles C. Hughes. Pages 243–246.
- Siberian Eskimo. Charles C. Hughes. Pages 247–261.
- Saint Lawrence Island Eskimo. Charles C. Hughes. Pages 262–277.
- North Alaska Eskimo: Introduction. Robert F. Spencer. Pages 278–284.
- Bering Strait Eskimo. Dorothy Jean Ray. Pages 285–302.
- Kotzebue Sound Eskimo. Ernest S. Burch, Jr. Pages 303–319.
- North Alaska Coast Eskimo. Robert F. Spencer. Pages 320–337.
- Interior North Alaska Eskimo. Edwin S. Hall. Pages 338–346.
- Mackenzie Delta Eskimo. Derek G. Smith. Pages 347–358.

Canadian Arctic

- Pre-Dorset and Dorset Prehistory of Canada. Moreau S. Maxwell. Pages 359–368.
- Thule Prehistory of Canada. Robert McGhee. Pages 369–376.
- Exploration and History of the Canadian Arctic. L.H. Neatby. Pages 377–390.
- Central Eskimo: Introduction. David Damas. Pages 391–396.
- Copper Eskimo. David Damas. Pages 397–414.
- Netsilik. Asen Balikci. Pages 415–430.
- Iglulik. Guy Mary-Rousselière. Pages 431–446.
- Caribou Eskimo. Eugene Y. Arima. Pages 447–462.
- Baffinland Eskimo. William B. Kemp. Pages 463–475.
- Inuit of Quebec. Bernard Saladin d'Anglure. Pages 476–507.
- Historical Ethnography of the Labrador Coast. J. Garth Taylor. Pages 508–521.

Greenland

- Greenland Eskimo: Introduction. Helge Kleivan. Pages 522–527.
- Paleo-Eskimo Cultures of Greenland. William W. Fitzhugh. Pages 528–539.
- Neo-Eskimo Prehistory of Greenland. Richard H. Jordan. Pages 540–548.
- History of Norse Greenland. Inge Kleivan. Pages 549–555.
- History of Colonial Greenland. Finn Gad. Pages 556–576.
- Polar Eskimo. Rolf Gilberg. Pages 577–594.
- West Greenland Before 1950. Inge Kleivan. Pages 595–621.
- East Greenland Before 1950. Robert Petersen. Pages 622–639.
- Greenlandic Written Literature. Robert Petersen. Pages 640–645.

The 1950–1980 Period

- Alaska Eskimo Modernization. Norman A. Chance. Pages 646–656.
- The Land Claims Era in Alaska. Ernest S. Burch. Jr. Pages 657–661.
- Contemporary Canadian Inuit. Frank G. Vallee, Derek G. Smith, & Joseph D. Cooper. Pages 662–675.
- The Grise Fiord Project. Milton M.R. Freeman. Pages 676–682.
- Contemporary Inuit of Quebec. Bernard Saladin d'Anglure. Pages 683–688.
- Coastal Northern Labrador After 1950. Anne Brantenberg & Terje Brantenberg. Pages 689–699.
- Contemporary Greenlanders. Helge Kleivan. Pages 700–717.
- East Greenland After 1950. Robert Petersen. Pages 718–723.
- The Pan-Eskimo Movement. Robert Petersen. Pages 724–728.

== Volume 6: Subarctic ==
Helm, June (1981), Subarctic, Washington, D.C.: Smithsonian Institution, p. 853, ISBN 978-0-16-004578-3

- Introduction. June Helm. Pages 1–4.
- General Environment. James S. Gardner. Pages 5–14.
- Major Fauna in the Traditional Economy. Beryl C. Gillespie. Pages 15–18.
- History of Ethnological Research in the Subarctic Shield and Mackenzie Borderlands. Edward S. Rogers. Pages 19–29.
- History of Archeological Research in the Subarctic Shield and Mackenzie Valley. Jacques Cinq-Mars & Charles A. Martijn. Pages 30–34.
- History of Research in the Subarctic Cordillera. Catharine McClellan. Pages 35–42.
- History of Research in Subarctic Alaska. Nancy Yaw Davis. Pages 43–48.
- Museum and Archival Resources for Subarctic Alaska. James W. VanStone. Pages 49–51.
- Subarctic Algonquian Languages. Richard A. Rhodes & Evelyn M. Todd. Pages 52–66.
- Northern Athapaskan Languages. Michael E. Krauss & Victor K. Golla. Pages 67–85.
- Prehistory of the Canadian Shield. James V. Wright. Pages 86–96.
- Prehistory of the Great Slave Lake and Great Bear Lake Region. William C. Noble. Pages 97–106.
- Prehistory of the Western Subarctic. Donald W. Clark. Pages 107–129.

Subarctic Shield and Mackenzie Borderlands

- Environment and Culture in the Shield and Mackenzie Borderlands. Edward S. Rogers & James G.E. Smith. Pages 130–146.
- Intercultural Relations and Cultural Change in the Shield and Mackenzie Borderlands. June Helm, Edward S. Rogers, & James G.E. Smith. Pages 146–157.
- Territorial Groups Before 1821: Cree and Ojibwa. Charles A. Bishop. Pages 158–160.
- Territorial Groups Before 1821: Athapaskans of the Shield and the Mackenzie Drainage. Beryl C. Gillespie. Pages 161–168.
- Montagnais-Naskapi. Edward S. Rogers & Eleanor Leacock. Pages 169–189.
- Seventeenth-Century Montagnais Social Relations and Values. Eleanor Leacock. Pages 190–195.
- East Main Cree. Richard J. Preston. Pages 196–207.
- Attikamek (Tête de Boule). Gérard E. McNulty & Louis Gilbert. Pages 208–216.
- West Main Cree. John J. Honigmann. Pages 217–230.
- Northern Ojibwa. Edward S. Rogers & J. Garth Taylor. Pages 231–243.
- Saulteaux of Lake Winnipeg. Jack H. Steinbring. Pages 244–255.
- Western Woods Cree. James G.E. Smith. Pages 256–270.
- Chipewyan. James G.E. Smith. Pages 271–284.
- Yellowknife. Beryl C. Gillespie. Pages 285–290.
- Dogrib. June Helm. Pages 291–309.
- Bearlake Indians. Beryl C. Gillespie. Pages 310–313.
- Hare. Joel S. Savishinsky & Hiroko Sue Hara. Pages 314–325.
- Mountain Indians. Beryl C. Gillespie. Pages 326–337.
- Slavey. Michael I. Asch. Pages 338–349.
- Beaver. Robin Ridington. Pages 350–360.
- Subarctic Métis. Richard Slobodin. Pages 361–371.

Subarctic Cordillera

- Environment and Culture in the Cordillera. Catharine McClellan & Glenda Denniston. Pages 372–386.
- Intercultural Relations and Cultural Change in the Cordillera. Catharine McClellan. Pages 387–401.
- Chilcotin. Robert B. Lane. Pages 402–412.
- Carrier. Margaret L. Tobey. Pages 413–432.
- Sekani. Glenda Denniston. Pages 433–441.
- Kaska. John J. Honigmann. Pages 442–450.
- Nahani. Beryl C. Gillespie. Pages 451–453.
- Tsetsaut. Wilson Duff. Pages 454–457.
- Tahltan. Bruce B. MacLachlan. Pages 458–468.
- Inland Tlingit. Catharine McClellan. Pages 469–480.
- Tagish. Catharine McClellan. Pages 481–492.
- Tutchone. Catharine McClellan. Pages 493–505.
- Han. John R. Crow & Philip R. Obley. Pages 506–513.
- Kutchin. Richard Slobodin. Pages 514–532.

Alaska Plateau

- Environment and Culture in the Alaska Plateau. Edward H. Hosley. Pages 533–545.
- Intercultural Relations and Cultural Change in the Alaska Plateau. Edward H. Hosley. Pages 546–555.
- Territorial Groups of West-Central Alaska Before 1898. James W. VanStone and Ives Goddard. Pages 556–561.
- Tanana. Robert A. McKennan. Pages 562–576.
- Upper Tanana River Potlatch. Marie-Françoise Guédon. Pages 577–581.
- Koyukon. A. McFadyen Clark. Pages 582–601.
- Ingalik. Jeanne H. Snow. Pages 602–617.
- Kolchan. Edward H. Hosley. Pages 618–622.

South of the Alaska Range

- Tanaina. Joan B. Townsend. Pages 623–640.
- Ahtna. Frederica de Laguna & Catharine McClellan. Pages 641–663.

Native Settlements

- Native Settlements: Introduction. June Helm. Pages 664–665.
- Davis Inlet, Labrador. Georg Henriksen. Pages 666–672.
- Great Whale River, Quebec. W.K. Barger. Pages 673–682.
- Fort Resolution, Northwest Territories. David M. Smith. Pages 683–693.
- Old Crow, Yukon Territory. Ann Welsh Acheson. Pages 694–703.
- Minto, Alaska. Wallace M. Olson. Pages 704–711.

Special Topics

- Modern Subarctic Indians and Métis. John J. Honigmann. Pages 712–717.
- Expressive Aspects of Subarctic Indian Culture. John J. Honigmann. Pages 718–738.

== Volume 7: Northwest Coast ==
Suttles, Wayne (1990), Northwest Coast, Washington, D.C.: Smithsonian Institution, p. 793, ISBN 978-0-16-020390-9

- Introduction. Wayne Suttles. Pages 1–15.
- Environment. Wayne Suttles. Pages 16–29.
- Languages. Laurence C. Thompson & M. Dale Kinkade. Pages 30–51.
- Human Biology. Jerome S. Cybulski. Pages 52–59.
- Cultural Antecedents. Roy L. Carlson. Pages 60–69.

History of Research

- History of Research: Early Sources. Wayne Suttles. Pages 70–72.
- History of Research in Ethnology. Wayne Suttles & Aldona C. Jonaitis. Pages 73–87.
- History of Research: Museum Collections. E.S. Lohse & Frances Sundt. Pages 88–97.
- History of Research in Linguistics. M. Dale Kinkade. Pages 98–106.
- History of Research in Archeology. Roy L. Carlson. Pages 107–115.
- History of Research in Physical Anthropology. Jerome S. Cybulski. Pages 116–118.

History of Contact

- History of the Early Period. Douglas Cole & David Darling. Pages 119–134.
- Demographic History, 1774–1874. Robert T. Boyd. Pages 135–148.
- History of Southeastern Alaska Since 1867. Rosita Worl. Pages 149–158.
- History of Coastal British Columbia Since 1849. J.E. Michael Kew. Pages 159–168.
- History of Western Washington Since 1846. Cesare Marino. Pages 169–179.
- History of Western Oregon Since 1846. Stephen Dow Beckham. Pages 180–188.

The Peoples

- Eyak. Frederica De Laguna. Pages 189–196.
- Prehistory of Southeastern Alaska. Stanley D. Davis. Pages 197–202.
- Tlingit. Frederica De Laguna. Pages 203–228.
- Prehistory of the Northern Coast of British Columbia. Knut R. Fladmark, Kenneth M. Ames, & Patricia D. Sutherland. Pages 229–239.
- Haida: Traditional Culture. Margaret B. Blackman. Pages 240–260.
- Haida Since 1960. Mary Lee Stearns. Pages 261–266.
- Tsimshian Peoples: Southern Tsimshian, Coast Tsimshian, Nishga, and Gitksan. Marjorie M. Halpin & Margaret Seguin. Pages 267–284.
- Tsimshian of British Columbia Since 1900. Gordon B. Inglis, Douglas R. Hudson, Barbara K. Rigsby, & Bruce Rigsby. Pages 285–293.
- Tsimshian of Metlakatla, Alaska. John A. Dunn & Arnold Booth. Pages 294–297.
- Prehistory of the Central Coast of British Columbia. Philip M. Hobler. Pages 298–305.
- Haisla. Charles Hamori-Torok. Pages 306–311.
- Haihais, Bella Bella, and Oowekeeno. Susanne F. Hilton. Pages 312–322.
- Bella Coola. Dorothy I.D. Kennedy & Randall T. Bouchard. Pages 323–339.
- Prehistory of the Coasts of Southern British Columbia and Northern Washington. Donald Mitchell. Pages 340–358.
- Kwakiutl: Traditional Culture. Helen Codere. Pages 359–377.
- Kwakiutl: Winter Ceremonies. Bill Holm. Pages 378–386.
- Kwakiutl Since 1980. Gloria Cranmer Webster. Pages 387–390.
- Nootkans of Vancouver Island. Eugene Arima & John Dewhirst. Pages 391–411.
- Prehistory of the Ocean Coast of Washington. Gary Wessen. Pages 412–421.
- Makah. Ann M. Renker & Erna Gunther. Pages 422–430.
- Quileute. James V. Powell. Pages 431–437.
- Chemakum. William W. Elmendorf. Pages 438–440.
- Northern Coast Salish. Dorothy I.D. Kennedy & Randall T. Bouchard. Pages 441–452.
- Central Coast Salish. Wayne Suttles. Pages 453–475.
- Central and Southern Coast Salish Ceremonies Since 1900. J.E. Michael Kew. Pages 476–480.
- Prehistory of the Puget Sound Region. Charles M. Nelson. Pages 481–484.
- Southern Coast Salish. Wayne Suttles & Barbara Lane. Pages 485–502.
- Southwestern Coast Salish. Yvonne Hajda. Pages 503–517.
- Prehistory of the Lower Columbia and Willamette Valley. Richard M. Pettigrew. Pages 518–529.
- Kwalhioqua and Clatskanie. Michael E. Krauss. Pages 530–532.
- Chinookans of the Lower Columbia. Michael Silverstein. Pages 533–546.
- Kalapuyans. Henry B. Zenk. Pages 547–553.
- Prehistory of the Oregon Coast. Richard E. Ross. Pages 554–559.
- Tillamook. William R. Seaburg & Jay Miller. Pages 560–567.
- Alseans. Henry B. Zenk. Pages 568–571.
- Siuslawans and Coosans. Henry B. Zenk. Pages 572–579.
- Athapaskans of Southwestern Oregon. Jay Miller & William R. Seaburg. Pages 580–588.
- Takelma. Daythal L. Kendall. Pages 589–592.

Special Topics

- Mythology. Dell Hymes. Pages 593–601.
- Art. Bill Holm. Pages 602–632.
- The Indian Shaker Church. Pamela T. Amoss. Pages 633–639.

== Volume 8: California ==
Heizer, Robert F. (1978), California, Washington, D.C.: Smithsonian Institution, p. 816, ISBN 978-0-16-004574-5

- Introduction. Rebert F. Heizer. Pages 1–5.
- History of Research. Robert F. Heizer. Pages 6–15.
- Environmental Background. Martin A Baumhoff. Pages 16–24.
- Post-Pleistocene Archeology, 9000 to 2000 B.C. William J. Wallace. Pages 25–36.
- Development of Regional Prehistoric Cultures. Albert B. Elsasser. Pages 37–57.
- Protohistoric and Historic Archeology. Chester King. Pages 58–68.
- Indian–Euro-American Interaction: Archeological Evidence from non-Indian Sites. Robert L. Schuyler. Pages 69–79.
- Native Languages of California. William F. Shipley. Pages 80–90.
- Historical Demography. Sherburne F. Cook. Pages 91–98.
- The Impact of Euro-American Exploration and Settlement. Edward D. Castillo. Pages 99–127.
- Tolowa. Richard A. Gould. Pages 128–136.
- Yurok. Arnold R. Pilling. Pages 137–154.
- Wiyot. Albert B. Elsasser. Pages 155–163.
- Hupa, Chilula, and Whilkut. William J. Wallace. Pages 164–179.
- Karok. William Bright. Pages 180–189.
- Mattole, Nongatl, Sinkyone, Lassik, and Wailaki. Albert B. Elsasser. Pages 190–204.
- Chimariko. Shirley Silver. Pages 205–210.
- Shastan Peoples. Shirley Silver. Pages 211–224.
- Achumawi. D.L. Olmsted & Omer C. Stewart. Pages 225–235.
- Atsugewi. T.R. Garth. Pages 236–243.
- Cahto. James E. Myers. Pages 244–248.
- Yuki, Huchnom, and Coast Yuki. Virginia P. Miller. Pages 249–255.
- Wappo. Jesse O. Sawyer. Pages 256–263.
- Lake Miwok. Catherine A. Callaghan. Pages 264–273.
- Pomo: Introduction. Sally McLendon & Robert L. Oswalt. Pages 274–288.
- Western Pomo and Northeastern Pomo. Lowell John Bean & Dorothea Theodoratus. Pages 289–305.
- Eastern Pomo and Southeastern Pomo. Sally McLendon & Michael J. Lowy. Pages 306–323.
- Wintu. Frank R. LaPena. Pages 324–340.
- Nomlaki. Walter Goldschmidt. Pages 341–349.
- Patwin. Patti J. Johnson. Pages 350–360.
- Yana. Jerald Jay Johnson. Pages 361–369.
- Maidu and Konkow. Francis A. Riddell. Pages 370–386.
- Nisenan. Norman L. Wilson & Arlean H. Towne. Pages 387–397.
- Eastern Miwok. Richard Levy. Pages 398–413.
- Coast Miwok. Isabel Kelly. Pages 414–425.
- Monache. Robert F.G. Spier. Pages 426–436.
- Tubatulabal. Charles R. Smith. Pages 437–445.
- Yokuts: Introduction. Michael Silverstein. Pages 446–447.
- Southern Valley Yokuts. William J. Wallace. Pages 448–461.
- Northern Valley Yokuts. William J. Wallace. Pages 462–470.
- Foothill Yokuts. Robert F.G. Spier. Pages 471–484.
- Costanoan. Richard Levy. Pages 485–495.
- Esselen. Thomas Roy Hester. Pages 496–499.
- Salinan. Thomas Roy Hester. Pages 500–504.
- Chumash: Introduction. Campbell Grant. Pages 505–508.
- Eastern Coastal Chumash. Campbell Grant. Pages 509–519.
- Obispeño and Purisimeño Chumash. Roberts S. Greenwood. Pages 520–523.
- Island Chumash. Campbell Grant. Pages 524–529.
- Interior Chumash. Campbell Grant. Pages 530–534.
- Tataviam. Chester King & Thomas C. Blackburn. Pages 535–537.
- Gabrielino. Lowell John Bean & Charles R. Smith. Pages 538–549.
- Luiseño. Lowell John Bean & Florence C. Shipek. Pages 550–563.
- Kitanemuk. Thomas C. Blackburn & Lowell John Bean. Pages 564–569.
- Serrano. Lowell John Bean & Charles R. Smith. Pages 570–574.
- Cahuilla. Lowell John Bean. Pages 575–587.
- Cupeño. Lowell John Bean & Charles R. Smith. Pages 588–591.
- Tipai and Ipai. Katharine Luomala. Pages 592–609.
- History of Southern California Mission Indians. Florence C. Shipek. Pages 610–618.
- Prehistoric Rock Art. C. William Clewlow, Jr. Pages 619–625.
- Basketry. Albert B. Elsasser. Pages 626–641.
- Music and Musical Instruments. William J. Wallace. Pages 642–648.
- Natural Forces and Native World View. Robert F. Heizer. Pages 649–653.
- Mythology: Regional Patterns and History of Research. Robert F. Heizer. Pages 654–657.
- Comparative Literature. William J. Wallace. Pages 658–661.
- Cults and Their Transformations. Lowell John Bean & Sylvia Brakke Vane. Pages 662–672.
- Social Organization. Lowell John Bean. Pages 673–682.
- Sexual Status and Role Differences. Edith Wallace. Pages 683–689.
- Trade and Trails. Robert F. Heizer. Pages 690–693.
- Intergroup Conflict. Thomas McCorkle. Pages 694–700.
- Treaties. Robert F. Heizer. Pages 701–704.
- Litigation and its Effects. Omer C. Stewart. Pages 705–712.
- Twentieth-Century Secular Movements. Edward D. Castillo. Pages 713–718.

== Volume 9: Southwest ==
Ortiz, Alfonso (1979), Southwest, Washington, D.C.: Smithsonian Institution, p. 701, ISBN 978-0-16-004577-6, OCLC 26140053

Volume 9 covers the Pueblo tribes of the Southwest. Volume 10 covers the non-Pueblo tribes of the Southwest.

- Introduction. Alfonso Ortiz. Pages 1–4.
- History of Archeological Research. Albert H. Schroeder. Pages 5–13.
- History of Ethnological Research. Keith H. Basso. Pages 14–21.
- Prehistory: Introduction. Richard B. Woodbury. Pages 22–30.
- Post-Pleistocene Archeology, 7000–2000 B.C. Cynthis Irwin-Williams Pages 31–42.
- Agricultural Beginnings, 2000 B.C.–A.D. 500. Richard B. Woodbury & Ezra B.W. Zubrow. Pages 43–60.
- Prehistory: Mogollon. Paul S. Martin. Pages 61–74.
- Prehistory: Hohokam. George J. Gumerman & Emil W. Haury. Pages 75–90.
- Prehistory: O'otam. Charles C. Di Peso. Pages 91–99.
- Prehistory: Hakataya. Albert H. Schroeder. Pages 100–107.
- Prehistory: Western Anasazi. Fred Plog. Pages 108–130.
- Prehistory: Eastern Anasazi. Linda S. Cordell. Pages 131–151.
- Prehistory: Southern Periphery. Charles C. Di Peso. Pages 152–161.
- Southern Athapaskan Archeology. Joseph H. Gunnerson. Pages 162–169.
- Historical Linguistics and Archeology. Kenneth Hale & David Harris. Pages 170–177.
- History of Pueblo–Spanish Relations to 1821. Marc Simmons. Pages 178–193.
- The Pueblo Revolt. Joe S. Sando. Pages 194–197.
- Genizaros. Fray Angelico Chavez. Pages 198–200.
- Relations of the Southwest with the Plains and Great Basin. Charles H. Lange. Pages 201–205.
- History of the Pueblos Since 1821. Marc Simmons. Pages 206–223.
- Pueblos: Introduction. Fred Eggan. Pages 224–235.
- Pueblos Abandoned in Historic Times. Albert H. Schroeder. Pages 236–254.
- Taos Pueblo. John J. Bodine. Pages 255–267.
- Picuris Pueblo. Donald N. Brown. Pages 268–277.
- San Juan Pueblo. Alfonso Ortiz. Pages 278–295.
- Santa Clara Pueblo. Nancy S. Arnon & W.W. Hill. Pages 296–307.
- San Ildefonso Pueblo. Sandra A. Edelman. Pages 308–316.
- Nambe Pueblo. Randall H. Speirs. Pages 317–323.
- Pojoaque Pueblo. Marjorie F. Lambert. Pages 324–329.
- Tesuque Pueblo. Sandra A. Edelman & Alfonso Ortiz. Pages 330–335.
- Tigua Pueblo. Nicholas P. Houser. Pages 336–342.
- Sandia Pueblo. Elizabeth A. Brandt. Pages 343–350.
- Isleta Pueblo. Florence Hawley Ellis. Pages 351–365.
- Cochiti Pueblo. Charles H. Lange. Pages 366–378.
- Santo Domingo Pueblo. Charles H. Lange. Pages 379–389.
- San Felipe Pueblo. Pauline Turner Strong. Pages 390–397.
- Santa Ana Pueblo. Pauline Turner Strong. Pages 398–406.
- Zia Pueblo. E. Adamson Hoebel. Pages 407–417.
- Jemez Pueblo. Joe S. Sando. Pages 418–429.
- Pecos Pueblo. Albert H. Schroeder. Pages 430–437.
- Laguna Pueblo. Florence Hawley Ellis. Pages 438–449.
- Acoma Pueblo. Velma Garcia-Mason. Pages 450–466.
- Zuni Prehistory and History to 1850. Richard B. Woodbury. Pages 467–473.
- Zuni History, 1850–1970. Fred Eggan & T.N. Pandey. Pages 474–481.
- Zuni Social and Political Organization. Edmund J. Ladd. Pages 482–491.
- Zuni Economy. Edmund J. Ladd. Pages 492–498.
- Zuni Religion and World View. Dennis Tedlock. Pages 499–508.
- Zuni Semantic Categories. Willard Walker. Pages 509–513.
- Hopi Prehistory and History to 1850. J.O. Brew. Pages 514–523.
- Hopi History, 1850–1940. Frederick J. Dockstader. Pages 524–532.
- Hopi History, 1940–1970. Richard O. Clemmer. Pages 533–538.
- Hopi Social Organization. John C. Connelly. Pages 539–553.
- Hopi Economy and Subsistence. Edward A. Kennard. Pages 554–563.
- Hopi Ceremonial Organization. Ariette Frigout. Pages 564–576.
- Hopi World View. Louis A. Hieb. Pages 577–580.
- Hopi Semantics. C.F. Voegelin, F.H. Voegelin, LaVerne Masayesva Jeanne. Pages 581–586.
- Hopi-Tewa. Michael B. Stanislawski. Pages 587–602.
- Pueblo Fine Arts. J.J. Brody. Pages 603–608.
- The Pueblo Mythological Triangle: Poseyemu, Montezuma, and Jesus in the Pueblos. Richard J. Parmentier. Pages 609–622.

== Volume 10: Southwest ==
Ortiz, Alfonso (1983), Southwest, Washington, D.C.: Smithsonian Institution, p. 884, ISBN 978-0-16-004579-0

Volume 10 covers the non-Pueblo tribes of the Southwest. Volume 9 covers the Pueblo tribes of the Southwest.

- Yuman: Introduction. Kenneth M. Stewart. Pages 1–4.
- Yuman Languages. Martha B. Kendall. Pages 4–12.
- Havasupai. Douglas W. Schwartz. Pages 13–24.
- Walapai. Thomas R. McGuire. Pages 25–37.
- Yavapai. Sigrid Khera & Patricia S. Mariella. Pages 38–54.
- Mohave. Kenneth M. Stewart. Pages 55–70.
- Maricopa. Henry O. Harwell & Marsha C.S. Kelly. Pages 71–85.
- Quechan. Robert L. Bee. Pages 86–98.
- Cocopa. Anita Alvarez de Williams. Pages 99–112.
- Uto-Aztecan Languages. Wick R. Miller. Pages 113–124.
- Pima and Papago: Introduction. Bernard L. Fontana. Pages 125–136.
- History of the Papago. Bernard L. Fontana. Pages 137–148.
- History of the Pima. Paul H. Ezell. Pages 149–160.
- Pima and Papago Ecological Adaptations. Robert A. Hackenberg. Pages 161–177.
- Pima and Papago Social Organization. Donald M. Bahr. Pages 178–192.
- Pima and Papago Medicine and Philosophy. Donal M. Bahr. Pages 193–200.
- Papago Semantics. Madeleine Mathiot. Pages 201–211.
- Contemporary Pima. Sally Giff Pablo. Pages 212–216.
- Lower Pima. Timothy Dunnigan. Pages 217–229.
- Seri. Thomas Bowen. Pages 230–249.
- Yaqui. Edward H. Spicer. Pages 250–263.
- Mayo. N. Ross Crumrine. Pages 264–275.
- Tarahumara. Campbell W. Pennington. Pages 276–289.
- Tarahumara Social Organization, Political Organization, and Religion. William L. Merrill. Pages 290–305.
- Northern Tepehuan. Campbell W. Pennington. Pages 306–314.
- Southern Periphery: West. Thomas Hinton. Pages 315–328.
- Southern Periphery: East. William B. Griffen. Pages 329–342.
- Coahuiltecans and Their Neighbors. T.N. Campbell. Pages 343–358.
- Karankawa. William W. Newcomb, Jr. Pages 359–367.
- The Apachean Culture Pattern and Its Origins. Morris E. Opler. Pages 368–392.
- Apachean Languages. Robert W. Young. Pages 393–400.
- Chiricahua Apache. Morris E. Opler. Pages 401–418.
- Mescalero Apache. Morris E. Opler. Pages 419–439.
- Jicarilla Apache. Veronica E. Tiller. Pages 440–461.
- Western Apache. Keith H. Basso. Pages 462–488.
- Navajo Prehistory and History to 1850. David M. Brugge. Pages 489–501.
- Navajo Views of Their Origin. Sam D. Gill. Pages 502–505.
- Navajo History, 1850–1923. Robert Roessel. Pages 506–523.
- Navajo Social Organization. Gary Witherspoon. Pages 524–535.
- Navajo Ceremonial System. Leland C. Wyman. Pages 536–557.
- Peyote Religion Among the Navajo. David F. Aberle. Pages 558–569.
- Language and Reality in Navajo World View. Gary Witherspon. Pages 570–578.
- A Taxonomic View of the Traditional Navajo Universe. Oswald Werner, Allen Manning, and Kenneth Yazzie Begishe. Pages 579–591.
- Navajo Arts and Crafts. Ruth Roessel. Pages 592–604.
- Navajo Music. David P. McAllester & Douglas F. Mitchell. Pages 605–623.
- Development of Navajo Tribal Government. Mary Shepardson. Pages 624–635.
- The Emerging Navajo Nation. Peter Iverson. Pages 636–640.
- Navajo Economic Development. David F. Aberle. Pages 641–658.
- Navajo Education. Gloria J. Emerson. Pages 659–671.
- Navajo Health Services and Projects. Robert L. Bergman. Pages 672–678.
- The Navajo Nation Today. Marshall Tome. Pages 679–683.
- Comparative Traditional Economics and Ecological Adaptations. Joseph G. Jorgensen. Pages 684–710.
- Inter-Indian Exchange in the Southwest. Richard I. Ford. Pages 711–722.
- Comparative Social Organization. Fred Eggan. Pages 723–742.
- Southwestern Ceremonialism. Louise Lamphere. Pages 743–763.
- Kachinas and Masking. James Seavey Griffith. Pages 764–777.

== Volume 11: Great Basin ==
d'Azevedo, Warren L. (1986), Great Basin, Washington, D.C.: Smithsonian Institution, p. 868, ISBN 978-0-16-004581-3

- Introduction. Warren L. d'Azevedo. Pages 1–14.
- History of Research. Don D. Fowler. Pages 15–30.
- Prehistoric Environments. Peter J. Mehringer, Jr. Pages 31–50.
- Historical Environments. Kimball T. Harper. Pages 51–63.
- Subsistence. Catherine S. Fowler. Pages 64–97.
- Numic Languages. Wick R. Miller. Pages 98–106.
- Washoe Language. William H. Jacobsen, Jr. Pages 107–112.

Prehistory

- Prehistory: Introduction. Jesse D. Jennings. Pages 113–119.
- Prehistory of the Northern Area. Luther S. Cressman. Pages 120–126.
- Prehistory of the Snake and Salmon River Area. B. Robert Butler. Pages 127–134.
- Prehistory of the Western Area. Robert G. Elston. Pages 135–148.
- Prehistory of the Eastern Area. C. Melvin Aikens & David B. Madsen. Pages 149–160.
- Fremont Cultures. John P. Marwitt. Pages 161–172.
- Prehistory of the Southeastern Area. Don D. Fowler & David B. Madsen. Pages 173–182.
- Prehistory of the Southwestern Area. Claude N. Warren & Robert H. Crabtree. Pages 183–193.
- Prehistoric Basketry. J.M. Adovasio. Pages 194–205.
- Prehistoric Ceramics. David B. Madsen. Pages 206–214.
- Rock Art. Polly Schaafsma. Pages 215–226.
- Portable Art Objects. Donald R. Tuohy. Pages 227–237.
- Early Trade. Richard E. Hughes & James A. Bennyhoff. Pages 238–255.
- Contract Anthropology. Donald L. Hardesty, Thomas J. Green, & La Mar W. Lindsay. Pages 256–261.

Ethnology

- Western Shoshone. David H. Thomas, Lorann S.A. Pendleton, & Stephen C. Cappannari. Pages 262–283.
- Northern Shoshone and Bannock. Robert F. Murphy & Yolanda Murphy. Pages 284–307.
- Eastern Shoshone. Demitri B. Shimkin. Pages 308–335.
- Ute. Donald G. Callaway, Joel C. Janetski, & Omer C. Stewart. Pages 336–367.
- Southern Paiute. Isabel T. Kelly & Catherine S. Fowler. Pages 368–397.
- Kawaiisu. Maurice Zigmond. Pages 398–411.
- Owens Valley Paiute. Sven Liljeblad & Catherine S. Fowler. Pages 412–434.
- Northern Paiute. Catherine S. Fowler & Sven Liljeblad. Pages 435–465.
- Washoe. Warren L. d'Azevedo. Pages 466–498.

History

- Euro-American Impact Before 1870. Carling I. Malouf & John Findlay. Pages 499–516.
- Introduction of the Horse. Demitri B. Shimkin. Pages 517–524.
- Treaties, Reservations, and Claims. Richard O. Clemmer & Omer C. Stewart. Pages 525–557.
- Tribal Politics. Elmer R. Rusco & Mary K. Rusco. Pages 558–572.
- Indian Economies, 1950–1980. Martha C. Knack. Pages 573–591.
- Issues: The Indian Perspective. Edward C. Johnson. Pages 592–600.
- Tribal Historical Projects. John R. Alley, Jr. Pages 601–607.

Special Topics

- Population. Joy Leland. Pages 608–619.
- Kinship. Judith R. Shapiro. Pages 620–629.
- Mythology and Religious Concepts. Åke Hultkrantz. Pages 630–640.
- Oral Tradition: Content and Style of Verbal Arts. Sven Liljeblad. Pages 641–659.
- Ghost Dance, Bear Dance, and Sun Dance. Joseph G. Jorgensen. Pages 660–672.
- The Peyote Religion. Omer C. Stewart. Pages 673–681.
- Music. Thomas Vennum, Jr. Pages 682–704.
- Ethnographic Basketry. Catherine S. Fowler & Lawrence E. Dawson. Pages 705–737.

== Volume 12: Plateau ==
Walker, Deward E. Jr. (1998), Plateau, Washington, D.C.: Smithsonian Institution, p. 807, ISBN 978-0-16-049514-4

- Introduction. Deward E. Walker, Jr. Pages 1–7.
- History of Research. E.S. Lohse & Roderick Sprague. Pages 8–28.
- Environment. James C. Chatters. Pages 29–48.
- Languages. M. Dale Kinkade, William W. Elmendorf, Bruce Rigsby, & Haruo Aoki. Pages 49–72.

Prehistory

- Prehistory: Introduction. James C. Chatters & David L. Pokotylo. Pages 73–80.
- Prehistory of the Northern Plateau. David L. Pokotylo & Donald Mitchell. Pages 81–102.
- Prehistory of the Southern Plateau. Kenneth M. Ames, Don E. Dumond, Jerry R. Galm, and Rick Minor. Pages 103–119.
- Prehistory of the Eastern Plateau. Tom E. Roll & Steven Hackenberger. Pages 120–137.

History

- History Until 1846. Deward E. Walker, Jr. & Roderick Sprague. Pages 138–148.
- History Since 1846. Stephen Dow Beckham. Pages 149–173.

The Peoples

- Lillooet. Dorothy I.D. Kennedy & Randall T. Bouchard. Pages 174–190.
- Thompson. David Wyatt. Pages 191–202.
- Shuswap. Marianne Boelscher Ignace. Pages 203–219.
- Nicola. David Wyatt. Pages 220–222.
- Kootenai. Bill B. Brunton. Pages 223–237.
- Northern Okanagan, Lakes, and Colville. Dorothy I.D. Kennedy & Randall T. Bouchard. Pages 238–252.
- Middle Columbia River Salishans. Jay Miller. Pages 253–270.
- Spokane. John Alan Ross. Pages 271–282.
- Kalispel. Sylvester L. Lahren, Jr. Pages 283–296.
- Flathead and Pend d'Oreille. Carling I. Malouf. Pages 297–312.
- Coeur d'Alene. Gary B. Palmer. Pages 313–326.
- Yakima and Neighboring Groups. Helen H. Schuster. Pages 327–351.
- Palouse. Roderick Sprague. Pages 352–359.
- Wasco, Wishram, and Cascades. David H. French & Kathrine S. French. Pages 360–377.
- Western Columbia River Sahaptins. Eugene S. Hunn & David H. French. Pages 378–394.
- Cayuse, Umatilla, and Walla Walla. Theodore Stern. Pages 395–419.
- Nez Perce. Deward E. Walker, Jr. Pages 420–438.
- Molala. Henry B. Zenk & Bruce Rigsby. Pages 439–445.
- Klamath and Modoc. Theodore Stern. Pages 446–466.

Special Topics

- Demographic History Until 1990. Robert T. Boyd. Pages 467–483.
- Reservations and Reserves. Sylvester L. Lahren, Jr. Pages 484–498.
- Religious Movements. Deward E. Walker, Jr. & Helen H. Schuster. Pages 499–514.
- Kinship, Family, and Gender Roles. Lillian A. Ackerman. Pages 515–524.
- Ethnobiology and Subsistence. Eugene S. Hunn, Nancy J. Turner, & David H. French. Pages 525–545.
- Music and Dance. Loran Olsen. Pages 546–572.
- The Stick Game. Bill B. Brunton. Pages 573–583.
- Mythology. Rodney Frey & Dell Hymes. Pages 584–599.
- Basketry. Richard G. Conn & Mary Dodds Schlick. Pages 600–610.
- Rock Art. Keo Boreson. Pages 611–619.
- Fishing. Gordon W. Hewes. Pages 620–640.
- Columbia River Trade Network. Theodore Stern. Pages 641–652.

== Volume 13: Plains ==
DeMallie, Raymond J. (2001), Plains, Washington, D.C.: Smithsonian Institution, p. 1376, ISBN 978-0-87474-193-3

Volume 13 is physically bound in two volumes (Part 1 and Part 2), but page numbering is continuous between the two parts. Part 1 ends at "Plains Métis", page 676.

- Introduction. Raymond J. DeMallie. Pages 1–13.
- History of Archeological Research. Waldo R. Wedel & Richard A. Krause. Pages 14–22.
- History of Ethnological and Ethnohistorical Research. Raymond J. DeMallie & John C. Ewers. Pages 23–43.
- Environment and Subsistence. Waldo R. Wedel & Gorge C. Frison. Pages 44–60.
- The Languages of the Plains: Introduction. Ives Goddard. Pages 61–70.
- The Algonquian Languages of the Plains. Ives Goddard. Pages 71–79.
- Caddoan Languages. Douglas R. Parks. Pages 80–93.
- Siouan Languages. Douglas R. Parks & Robert L. Rankin. Pages 94–114.

Prehistory

- Hunting and Gathering Tradition: Canadian Plains. Ian Dyck & Richard E. Morlan. Pages 115–130.
- Hunting and Gathering Tradition: Northwestern and Central Plains. George C. Frison. Pages 131–145.
- Hunting and Gathering Tradition: Southern Plains. Susan C. Vehik. Pages 146–158.
- Plains Woodland Tradition. Alfred E. Johnson. Pages 159–172.
- Plains Village Tradition: Central. Waldo R. Wedel. Pages 173–185.
- Plains Village Tradition: Middle Missouri. W. Raymond Wood. Pages 186–195.
- Plains Village Tradition: Coalescent. Richard A. Krause. Pages 196–206.
- Plains Village Tradition: Southern. Robert E. Bell & Robert L. Brooks. Pages 207–221.
- Plains Village Tradition: Eastern Periphery and Oneota Tradition. Dale R. Henning. Pages 222–233.
- Plains Village Tradition: Western Periphery. James H. Gunnerson. Pages 234–244.
- Plains Village Tradition: Postcontact. Donald J. Lehmer. Pages 245–255.

History

- History of the United States Plains Until 1850. William R. Swagerty. Pages 256–279.
- History of the United States Plains Since 1850. Loretta Fowler. Pages 280–299.
- History of the Canadian Plains Until 1870. Jennifer S.H. Brown. Pages 300–312.
- History of the Canadian Plains Since 1870. David McCrady. Pages 313–328.

Prairie Plains

- Hidatsa. Frank Henderson Stewart. Pages 329–348.
- Mandan. W. Raymond Wood & Lee Irwin. Pages 349–364.
- Arikara. Douglas R. Parks. Pages 365–390.
- Three Affiliated Tribes. Mary Jane Schneider. Pages 391–398.
- Omaha. Margot P. Liberty, W. Raymond Wood, & Lee Irwin. Pages 399–415.
- Ponca. Donald N. Brown & Lee Irwin. Pages 416–431.
- Iowa. Mildred Mott Wedel. Pages 432–446.
- Otoe and Missouria. Marjorie M. Schweitzer. Pages 447–461.
- Kansa. Garric, A. Bailey & Gloria A. Young. Pages 462–475.
- Osage. Garrick A. Bailey. Pages 476–496.
- Quapaw. Gloria A. Young & Michael P. Hoffman. Pages 497–514.
- Pawnee. Douglas R. Parks. Pages 515–547.
- Wichita. William W. Newcomb, Jr. Pages 548–566.
- Kitsai. Douglas R. Parks. Pages 567–571.

High Plains

- Assiniboine. Raymond J. DeMallie & David Reed Miller. Pages 572–595.
- Stoney. Ian A.L. Getty & Erik D. Gooding. Pages 596–603.
- Blackfoot. Hugh A. Dempsey. Pages 604–628.
- Sarcee. Hugh A. Dempsey. Pages 629–637.
- Plains Cree. Regna Darnell. Pages 638–651.
- Plains Ojibwa. Patricia C. Albers. Pages 652–660.
- Plains Métis. Diane Paulette Payment. Pages 661–676.
- Gros Ventre. Loretta Fowler & Regina Flannery. Pages 677–694.
- Crow. Fred W. Voget. Pages 695–717.
- Sioux Until 1850. Raymond J. DeMallie. Pages 718–760.
- Santee. Patricia C. Albers. Pages 761–776.
- Yankton and Yanktonai. Raymond J. DeMallie. Pages 777–793.
- Teton. Raymond J. DeMallie. Pages 794–820.
- Sioux, 1930–2000. Dennis M. Christafferson. Pages 821–839.
- Arapaho. Loretta Fowler. Pages 840–862.
- Cheyenne. John H. Moore, Margot P. Liberty, & A. Terry Straus. Pages 863–885.
- Comanche. Thomas W. Kavanagh. Pages 886–906.
- Kiowa. Jerrold E. Levy. Pages 907–925.
- Plains Apache. Morris W. Foster & Martha McCollough. Pages 926–940.
- Lipan Apache. Morris E. Opler. Pages 941–952.
- Tonkawa. William W. Newcomb, Jr. & Thomas N. Campbell. Pages 953–964.

Special Topics

- Enigmatic Groups. Douglas R. Praks. Pages 965–973.
- Kinship and Social Organization. Fred Eggan & Joseph A. Maxwell. Pages 974–982.
- Sun Dance. JoAllyn Archambault. Pages 983–995.
- Intertribal Religious Movements. Gloria A. Young. Pages 996–1010.
- Celebrations and Giveaways. Gloria A. Young & Erik D. Gooding. Pages 1011–1025.
- Music. Gloria A. Young. Pages 1026–1038.
- Art Until 1900. Candace S. Greene. Pages 1039–1054.
- Art Since 1900. JoAllyn Archambault. Pages 1055–1061.
- Tribal Traditions and Records. Raymond J. DeMallie & Douglas R. Parks. Pages 1062–1073.

== Volume 14: Southeast ==
Fogelson, Raymond D. (2004), Southeast, Washington, D.C.: Smithsonian Institution, p. 1058, ISBN 978-0-16-072300-1

- Introduction. Jason Baird Jackson & Raymond D. Fogelson. Pages 1–13.
- History of Archeological Research. James B. Stoltman. Pages 14–30.
- History of Ethnological and Linguistic Research. Jason Baird Jackson, Raymond D. Fogelson, & William C. Sturtevant. Pages 31–47.
- Demographic History. Russell Thornton. Pages 48–52.
- Environment. Kristen J. Gremillion. Pages 53–67.
- Languages. Jack B. Martin. Pages 68–86.

Regional Prehistory

- Early and Middle Holocene Periods, 9500 to 3750 B.C. David G. Anderson & Kenneth E. Sassaman. Pages 87–100.
- Late Holocene Period, 3750 to 650 B.C. Kenneth E. Sassaman & David G. Anderson. Pages 101–114.
- Regional Cultures, 700 B.C.–A.D. 1000. Richard W. Jefferies. Pages 115–127.

History

- History Until 1776. Claudio Saunt. Pages 128–138.
- The American Revolution to the Mid-Nineteenth Century. Gregory Evans Dowd. Pages 139–151.
- History of the Old South Since Removal. John R. Finger & Theda Perdue. Pages 152–161.
- History of the Western Southeast Since Removal. Donal L. Fixico. Pages 162–173.
- Small Tribes of the Western Southeast. Ives Goddard, Patricia Galloway, Marvin D. Jeter, Gregory A. Waskelkov, & John E. Worth. Pages 174–190.

Florida

- Prehistory of Florida After 500 B.C. Jerald T. Milanich. Pages 191–203.
- Calusa. William H. Marquardt. Pages 204–212.
- Early Groups of Central and South Florida. Jerald T. Milanich. Pages 213–218.
- Timucua. JErald T. Milanich. Pages 219–228.

Atlantic Coastal Plain

- Prehistory of the Lower Atlantic Coast After 500 B.C. Jerald T. Milanich. Pages 229–237.
- Guale. John E. Worth. Pages 238–244.
- Yamasee. John E. Worth. Pages 245–253.
- Cusabo. Gene Waddell. Pages 254–264.

Interior Southeast

- Prehistory of the Eastern Interior After 500 B.C. David J. Hally & Robert C. Mainfort, Jr. Pages 265–285.
- Tutelo and Neighboring Groups. Raymond J. DeMallie. Pages 286–300.
- Catawba and Neighboring Groups. Blair A. Rudes, Thomas J. Blumer, & J. Alan May. Pages 301–318.
- Lumbee. Karen I. Blu. Pages 319–327.
- Indians of the Carolinas Since 1900. Patricia B. Lerch. Pages 328–336.
- Cherokee in the East. Raymond D. Fogelson. Pages 337–353.
- Cherokee in the West: History Since 1776. Duane H. King. Pages 354–372.
- Creek Confederacy Before Removal. Willard B. Walker. Pages 373–392.
- Creek in the West. Pamela Innes. Pages 393–403.
- Creek in the East Since Removal. Anthony J. Paredes. Pages 404–406.
- Alabama and Koasati. Stephanie A. May. Pages 407–414.
- Yuchi. Jason Baird Jackson. Pages 415–428.
- Florida Seminole and Miccosukee. William C. Sturtevant & Jessica R. Cattelino. Pages 429–449.
- Seminole in the West. Richard A. Sattler. Pages 450–464.
- Seminole Maroons. Kevin Mulroy. Pages 465–477.
- Chickasaw. Robert A. Brightman & Pamela S. Wallace. Pages 478–495.
- Chakchiuma. Patricia Galloway. Pages 496–498.
- Choctaw in the East. Patricia Galloway & Clara Sue Kidwell. Pages 499–519.
- Choctaw in the West. Clara Sue Kidwell. Pages 520–530.
- Choctaw at Ardmore, Oklahoma. Victoria Lindsay Levine. Pages 531–533.

Mississippi Valley and Gulf Coastal Plain

- Prehistory of the Central Mississippi Valley and Ozarks After 500 B.C. Martha Ann Rolingson. Pages 534–544.
- Prehistory of the Lower Mississippi Valley After 800 B.C. Tristram R. Kidder. Pages 545–559.
- Prehistory of the Western Interior After 500 B.C. Ann M. Early. Pages 560–573.
- Prehistory of the Gulf Coastal Plain After 500 B.C. Ian W. Brown. Pages 574–585.
- Tunica, Biloxi, and Ofo. Jeffrey P. Brain, George Roth, & Willem J. de Reuse. Pages 586–597.
- Natchez and Neighboring Groups. Patricia Galloway & Jason Baird Jackson. Pages 598–615.
- Caddo. J. Daniel Rogers & George Sabo, III. Pages 616–631.
- Houma. Jack Campisi. Pages 632–641.
- Chitimacha. Robert A. Brightman. Pages 642–652.
- Survival and Maintenance Among Louisiana Tribes. Hiram F. Gregory, Jr. Pages 653–658.
- Atakapans and Neighboring Groups. William W. Newcomb, Jr. Pages 659–663.
- Chacato, Pensacola, Tahomé, Naniaba, and Mobila. George E. Lankford. Pages 664–668.
- Apalachee and Neighboring Groups. Bonnie G. McEwan. Pages 669–676.

Special Topics

- Exchange and Interaction Until 1500. James A. Brown. Pages 677–685.
- Exchange and Interaction Since 1500. Gregory A. Waselkov. Pages 686–696.
- Social Organization. Greg Urban & Jason Baird Jackson. Pages 697–706.
- Mythology and Folklore. Greg Urban & Jason Baird Jackson. Pages 707–719.
- Music. Victoria Lindsay Levine. Pages 720–733.
- Ceremonialism Until 1500. Vernon James Knight. Pages 734–741.
- Native Christianity Since 1800. C. Blue Clark. Pages 742–752.
- African-Americans in Indian Societies. Tiya Miles & Celia E. Naylor-Ojurongbe. Pages 753–759.
- Resurgence and Recognition. Jack Campisi. Pages 760–768.

== Volume 15: Northeast ==
Trigger, Bruce G. (1978), Northeast, Washington, D.C.: Smithsonian Institution, p. 924, ISBN 978-0-16-004575-2

- Introduction. Bruce G. Trigger. Pages 1–3.
- History of Research. Elisabeth Tooker. Pages 4–13.

General Prehistory

- Prehistory: Introduction. JAmes E. Fitting. Pages 14–15.
- Post-Pleistocene Adaptations. Robert E. Funk. Pages 16–27.
- Regional Cultural Development, 3000 to 300 B.C. James A. Tuck. Pages 28–43.
- Regional Cultural Development, 300 B.C. to A.D. 1000. James E. Fitting. Pages 44–57.

Coastal Region

- Late Prehistory of the East coast. Dean R. Snow. Pages 58–69.
- Eastern Algonquian Languages. Ives Goddard. Pages 70–77.
- Early Indian–European Contacts. T.J. Brasser. Pages 78–88.
- Seventeenth-Century Indian Wars. Wilcomb E. Washburn. Pages 89–100.
- Beothuk. Barrie Reynolds. Pages 101–108.
- Micmac. Philip K. Bock. Pages 109–122.
- Maliseet-Passamaquoddy. Vincent O. Erikson. Pages 123–136.
- Eastern Abenaki. Dean R. Snow. Pages 137–147.
- Western Abenaki. Gordon M. Day. Pages 148–159.
- Indians of Southern New England and Long Island: Early Period. Bert Salwen. Pages 160–176.
- Indians of Southern New England and Long Island: Late Period. Laura E. Conkey, Ethel Boissevain, & Ives Goddard. Pages 177–189.
- Narragansett. William S. Simmons. Pages 190–197.
- Mahican. T.J. Brasser. Pages 198–212.
- Delaware. Ives Goddard. Pages 213–239.
- Nanticoke and Neighboring Tribes. Christian F. Feest. Pages 240–252.
- Virginia Algonquians. Christian F. Feest. Pages 253–270.
- North Carolina Algonquians. Christian F. Feest. Pages 271–281.
- Iroquoian Tribes of the Virginia–North Carolina Coastal Plain. Douglas W. Boyce. Pages 282–289,
- Marginal Groups. Brewton Berry. Pages 290–295.

Saint Lawrence Lowlands Region

- Northern Iroquoian Culture Patterns. William N. Fenton. Pages 296–321.
- Northern Iroquoian Prehistory. James A. Tuck. Pages 322–333.
- Iroquoian Languages. Floyd G. Lounsbury. Pages 334–343.
- Early Iroquoian Contacts with Europeans. Bruce G. Trigger. Pages 344–356.
- Saint Lawrence Iroquoians. Bruce G. Trigger & James F. Pendergast. Pages 357–361.
- Susquehannock. Francis Jennings. Pages 362–367.
- Huron. Conrad E. Heidenreich. Pages 368–388.
- Huron of Lorette. Christian Morissonneau. Pages 389–393.
- Khionontateronon (Petun). Charles Garrad & Conrad E. Heidenreich. Pages 394–397.
- Wyandot. Elisabeth Tooker. Pages 398–406.
- Neutral and Wenro. Marian E. White. Pages 407–411.
- Erie. Marian E. White. Pages 412–417.
- The League of the Iroquois: Its History, Politics, and Ritual. Elisabeth Tooker. Pages 418–441.
- Origins of the Longhouse Religion. Anthony F.C. Wallace. Pages 441–448.
- Iroquois Since 1820. Elisabeth Tooker. Pages 449–465.
- Mohawk. William N. Fenton & Elisabeth Tooker. Pages 466–480.
- Oneida. Jack Campisi. Pages 481–490.
- Onondaga. Harold Blau, Jack Campisi, & Elisabeth Tooker. Pages 491–499.
- Cayuga. Marian E. White, William E. Engelbrecht, & Elisabeth Tooker. Pages 500–504.
- Seneca. Thomas S. Abler & Elisabeth Tooker. Pages 505–517.
- Tuscarora Among the Iroquois. David Landy. Pages 518–524.
- Six Nations of the Grand River, Ontario. Sally M. Weaver. Pages 525–536.
- Oklahoma Seneca–Cayuga. William C. Sturtevant. Pages 537–543.
- Iroquois in the West. Jack A. Frisch. Pages 544–546.

Great Lakes–Riverine Region

- Late Prehistory of the Ohio Valley. James B. Griffin. Pages 547–559.
- Late Prehistory of the Illinois Area. Melvin L. Fowler & Robert L. Hall. Pages 560–568.
- Late Prehistory of the Upper Great Lakes Area. David S. Brose. Pages 569–582.
- Central Algonquian Languages. Ives Goddard. Pages 583–593.
- History of the Ohio Valley. William A. Hunter. Pages 588–593.
- History of the Illinois Area. J. Joseph Bauxar. Pages 594–601.
- History of the Upper Great Lakes Area. Lyle M. Stone & Donald Chaput. Pages 602–609.
- Great Lakes–Riverine Sociopolitical Organization. Charles Callender. Pages 610–621.
- Shawnee. Charles Callender. Pages 622–635.
- Fox. Charles Callender. Pages 636–647.
- Sauk. Charles Callender. Pages 648–655.
- Kickapoo. Charles Callender, Richard K. Pope, & Susan M. Pope. Pages 656–667.
- Mascouten. Ives Goddard. Pages 668–672.
- Illinois. Charles Callender. Pages 673–680.
- Miami. Charles Callender. Pages 681–689.
- Winnebago. Nancy Oestreich Lurie. Pages 690–707.
- Menominee. Louise S. Spindler. Pages 708–724.
- Potawatomi. James A. Clifton. Pages 725–742.
- Southwestern Chippewa. Robert E. Ritzenthaler. Pages 743–759.
- Southeastern Ojibwa. E.S. Rogers. Pages 760–771.
- Ottawa. Johanna E. Feest & Christian F. Feest. Pages 772–786.
- Nipissing. Gordon M. Day. Pages 787–791.
- Algonquin. Gordon M. Day & Bruce G. Trigger. Pages 792–797.
- Cultural Unity and Diversity. Bruce G. Trigger. Pages 798–804.

== Volume 17: Languages ==
Goddard, Ives (1996), Languages, Washington, D.C.: Smithsonian Institution, p. 958, ISBN 978-0-87474-197-1

The map "Native Languages and Language Families of North America" compiled by Ives Goddard is included in a pocket in the inside cover along with a small photographic reproduction of John Wesley Powell's 1891 map, "Linguistic Stocks of American Indians North of Mexico". A wall size version of the former is available separately (ISBN 978-0-8032-9269-7).

- Introduction. Ives Goddard. Pages 1–16.
- The Description of the Native Languages of North America Before Boas. Ives Goddard. Pages 17–42.
- The Description of the Native Languages of North America: Boas and After. Marianne Mithun. Pages 43–63.
- Language and the Culture History of North America. Michael K. Foster. Pages 64–110.
- Borrowing. Catherine A. Callaghan & Geoffrey Gamble. Pages 111–116.
- Dynamics of Linguistic Contact. Michael Silverstein. Pages 117–136.
- Overview of General Characteristics. Marianne Mithun. Pages 137–157.
- Native Writing Systems. Willard B. Walker. Pages 158–184.
- Place-Names. Patricia O. Afable & Madison S. Beeler. Pages 185–199.
- Personal Names. David H. French & Kathrine S. French. Pages 200–221.
- The Ethnography of Speaking. Wick R. Miller. Pages 222–243.
- Discourse. M. Dale Kinkade & Anthony Mattina. Pages 244–274.
- Nonspeech Communication Systems. Allan R. Taylor. Pages 275–289.
- The Classification of the Native Languages of North America. Ives Goddard. Pages 290–324.

Grammatical Sketches

- Sketch of Central Alaskan Yupik, an Eskimoan Language. Osahito Miyaoka. Pages 325–363.
- Sketch of Hupa, an Athapaskan Language. Victor Golla. Pages 364–389.
- Sketch of Cree, an Algonquian Language. H.C. Wolfart. Pages 390–439.
- Sketch of Lakhota, A Siouan Language. David S. Rood & Allan R. Taylor. Pages 440–482.
- Sketch of the Zuni Language. Stanley Newman. Pages 483–506.
- Sketch of Eastern Pomo, a Pomoan Language. Sally McLendon. Pages 507–550.
- Sketch of Seneca, an Iroquoian Language. Wallace L. Chafe. Pages 551–579.
- Sketch of Wichita, a Caddoan Language. David S. Rood. Pages 580–608.
- Sketch of Thompson, A Salishan Language. Laurence C. Thompson, M. Terry Thompson, & Steven M. Egesdal. Pages 609–643.
- Sketch of Coahuilteco, a Language Isolate of Texas. Rudolph C. Troike. Pages 644–665.
- Sketch of Sahaptin, a Sahaptian Language. Bruce Rigsby & Noel Rude. Pages 666–692.
- Sketch of Shoshone, a Uto-Aztecan Language. Wick R. Miller. Pages 693–720.
- Sources. Herbert J. Landar. Pages 721–761.

== Planned but unpublished volumes ==
With the suspension of publication, the following volumes remain unpublished.

- Volume 16, Technology and Visual Arts
- Volume 18, Biographical Dictionary
- Volume 19, Biographical Dictionary
- Volume 20, Index

== See also ==
- Handbook of Middle American Indians
- Handbook of South American Indians
- National Museum of the American Indian
