= June Helm =

American anthropologist (1924–2004)

- Born: September 13, 1924; Twin Falls, Idaho
- Died: February 5, 2004 (aged 79)
- Education: University of Chicago (1944) M.A., University of Chicago (1949); Ph.D., University of Chicago (1958)
- Occupation: Anthropologist
- Spouses: Richard MacNeish (1945–1958); Pierce King (1968–2004)

June Helm (September 13, 1924 – February 5, 2004) was an American anthropologist, primarily known for her work with the Dene people in the Mackenzie River drainage.

== Early life and education ==
Helm was born in Twin Falls, Idaho in 1924, to William Jennings Helm and Julia Frances (née Dixon) Helm. In 1930, the family moved to Kansas City, Kansas. Helm experienced a solitary childhood, full of illness, and was a shy, anxious child. After high school, Helm enrolled in anthropology at the University of Kansas, because of its modest tuition, and there she completed a year of education. In 1942, her father's machinery repair business experienced a boom, leading to the finances necessary for Helm to transfer to the University of Chicago, her school of choice. Helm graduated with a Bachelor of Philosophy from the University of Chicago in 1944, after completing the two-year program. Helm received her M.A. in 1949. She received encouragement from Robert Redfield and George Peter Murdock, both of whom influenced her study. Helm received her PhD in 1958 from the University of Chicago, after completing her dissertation, which was published by the National Museums of Canada in 1961, titled Lynx Point People.

== Personal life ==
In 1945, Helm married Richard “Scotty” MacNeish, who was a Ph.D candidate in the field of archaeology. In 1949, they moved to Ottawa, Ontario. The two amicably divorced in 1958, at which point Helm returned to Chicago. In 1968, Helm married Pierce King, an architect. The two stayed together until her death.

In 1989, Helm suffered from a stroke, which resulted in partial paralysis. She continued to teach for another decade, however, retiring in December 1999.

== Career ==
In 1945, Helm and MacNeish travelled to Mexico, where MacNeish completed archaeological field work. This was Helm's introduction to field work, and the next year, she conducted ethnographic research among the people of the region, for her Masters' thesis. Upon Helm and MacNeish's move to Ottawa, Helm became a sessional lecturer at Carlton University, from 1949 to 1959. In the summer of 1950, while MacNeish took part in an archaeological survey of the Mackenzie River, Helm became involved with the Dene people living nearby, to whom she gave the name “The Lynx Point People” in her 1958 dissertation. While working there, Helm learned that they were interested in having their children learn English, so the following summer, Helm returned with Teresa Carterette. The two volunteered as teachers, and also spent time doing fieldwork, to get a better understanding of the people. Helm continued to conduct interviews between 1954 and 1957, contacting people from Chipewyan, Hare and Slavey communities. Upon her return, Helm focused on the history and ethnography of the Slavey communities, of which there was little. Helm made great forays in understanding and relating the culture of the northern Athapaskan people, and she disproved hypotheses or discovered errors in the works of Julian Steward and Leslie Spier.

In 1957, during a linguistics course, Helm met Nancy Oestreich Lurie, and the two became friends. In 1959, the two went to do fieldwork among the Dogrib people in the Northwest Territories. They returned to work with other Dogrib groups in 1962 and 1967. After this point, Helm continued her research alone, making ten trips to do fieldwork between 1959 and 1979.

Helm worked as a tenured professor of Anthropology at the University of Iowa, having worked there from 1960 to December 1999. When Helm first joined the department, it was the Department of Sociology and Anthropology; she worked towards the creation of separate departments, which came to fruition in 1969, and she served as chair. Helm also established an American Indian and Native Studies program, and serves as the first chair, from 1993–1996.

In 1996, Helm was contacted by John Zoe, a Dogrib official, and Thomas Andrews, an archaeologist at the Prince of Wales Northern Heritage Centre, located in Yellowknife, regarding artifacts which had been taken by a graduate student of the University of Iowa in 1894, Frank Russell. Helm assisted in the negotiations for repatriation of the artifacts, particularly a caribou skin tent, which had been too large to exhibit. The negotiations were successful, and the tent was returned to the Dogrib people.

Throughout her career, Helm published 11 books and monographs, and more than 40 articles and chapters. Helm spent the last few years of her life assembling her notes, photographs and records from her fieldwork, and sent them to Yellowknife, to be available to the Dene people.

== Honours and accomplishments ==
Helm served as an adviser to the Indian Brotherhood of the Northwest Territories (now the Dene Nation), assisting them as a consultant in terms of land claims rights and research in the Mackenzie Valley Pipeline Inquiry.

Helm served as president of several societies and associations; the Central States Anthropological Society for 1970–1971, the American Ethnological Association from 1981–1983, and the American Anthropological Association from 1986–1987.

In 1994, Helm was elected as a Fellow of the American Academy of Arts and Sciences. Helm received the F. Wendell Miller Distinguished Achievement Award in 1995.

Helm's contributions to the University of Iowa have been recognized, particularly with the creation of the June Helm Award for Service and Excellence, which is awarded annually to a graduate student.

== Publications by Helm ==
As a sole author

- The Lynx Point People: The Dynamics of a Northern Athapaskan Band Ottawa: National Museum of Canada, 1961.
- The Indians of the Subarctic: A Critical Bibliography. Don Mills, Ontario: Fitzhenry & Whiteside Limited, 1976. ISBN 978-0-253-33004-8
- The People of Denendeh: Ethnohistory of the Indians of Canada's Northwest Territories. Iowa City, Iowa: University of Iowa Press, 2000. ISBN 978-0-7735-2145-2

As editor or coauthor

- Pioneers of American Anthropology: The Uses of Biography. Seattle: University of Washington Press, 1966.
- Essays on the Verbal and Visual Arts. Seattle: University of Washington Press, 1967.
