= Candace S. Greene =

American anthropologist

- Education: Brown University; University of Oklahoma
- Scientific career
- Fields: Anthropology
- Workplaces: National Museum of Natural History, Smithsonian Institution

Candace S. Greene is a museum anthropologist on the staff of the Department of Anthropology, National Museum of Natural History, Smithsonian Institution.

== Life ==
She graduated with an M.A.in anthropology (1976) from Brown University, and a Ph.D. (1985) from the University of Oklahoma. She is the author of numerous studies focusing on the material culture and visual culture of indigenous tribal societies of the Great Plains region.

She was recognized with the Distinguished Service/Lifetime Achievement Award by the Council for Museum Anthropology in 2018, the Council for Museum Anthropology’s Michael M. Ames Prize for Innovative Museum Anthropology in 2012 and a Webby Award in 2005. This award was in recognition of her contribution to the field of museum anthropology through her founding and leading of Summer Institute in Museum Anthropology (2009–present), a National Science Foundation-funded training program that prepares graduate students for research work using museum collections as a key data source.

== Works ==
- Silver Horn: Master Illustrator of the Kiowas University of Oklahoma Press 2002. ISBN 978-0806133072
- One Hundred Summers: A Kiowa Calendar Record (University of Nebraska Press, 2009)
- {ed} The Year the Stars Fell: Lakota Winter Counts at the Smithsonian (University of Nebraska Press, 2007)
