= Ira Jacknis =

American anthropologist (1952–2021)

Ira Stuart Jacknis (March 25, 1952 - September 29, 2021) was an American anthropologist who studied Native American art of the Northwest Coast. Jacknis had studied anthropology and art history as an undergraduate, deepening his interests in the history of anthropology while working as an intern at the Smithsonian Institution under curator William C. Sturtevant. He then continued his studies in history and anthropology under the tutelage Nancy Munn, Raymond Fogelson, and George W. Stocking at the University of Chicago. Much of Jacknis' work connected to ethnography, art history, and the history of anthropology.

He was based at the Phoebe A. Hearst Museum of Anthropology at the University of California, Berkeley since 1991 until his death.

== Early life and education ==
Ira Jacknis was born in New York City in 1952, the oldest of three children. Then his family moved to the East Hills section of Roslyn Heights, Long Island.

After high school, Jacknis attended Yale University and graduated summa cum laude with a B.A. in anthropology and art history in 1974. He then continued his studies at the University of Chicago where he earned his M.A. and PhD in anthropology. Jacknis completed his dissertation, "The storage box of tradition : museums, anthropologists, and Kwakiutl art, 1881-1981," in 1989.

== Career ==
After receiving his doctorate degree, Ira Jacknis joined the Phoebe A. Hearst Museum of Anthropology (then the Lowie Museum) as an associate research anthropologist in 1991. Then he became a full research anthropologist until his retirement. Jacknis specialized in the ethnography of Native Americans, especially Indigenous people of the Northwest Coast and California. He also extensively researched the lives of people associated with the museum, including Phoebe Hearst, Alfred Kroeber, Samuel Barrett, and Ishi.

== Bibliography ==
- Jacknis, Ira (1985) 'Franz Boas and Exhibits, On the Limitations of the Museum Method of Anthropology.' in Objects and Others, Essays on Museums and Material Culture, George W. Stocking (ed.) Madison: University of Wisconsin Press. pp. 75–111.
- Jacknis, Ira (2002) The Storage Box of Tradition: Kwakiutl Art, Anthropologists, and Museums, 1881-1981. Washington: Smithsonian Institution Press.
- Mauzé, Marie, Michael E. Harkin, and Sergei Kan (eds.) (2004) Coming to Shore: Northwest Coast Ethnology, Traditions, and Visions. Lincoln: University of Nebraska Press.
- Jacknis, Ira, ed. (2004) "Food in California Indian Culture." Berkeley: Phoebe Hearst Museum of Anthropology.
- Jacknis, Ira (2007) "Carving Traditions of Northwest California (Classics in California Anthropology)" Phoebe A. Hearst Museum of Anthropology, Berkeley.
