= Unitarian Universalist Church of Boulder =

Church in Colorado, United States

- Unitarian Universalist Church of Boulder
- 40°0′25″N 105°13′58″W
- Address: 5001 Pennsylvania Ave, Boulder, CO
- Country: United States
- Denomination: Unitarian Universalist
- Website: uuchurchofboulder.org

History
- Former name: The Unitarian Fellowship of Boulder
- Status: Church
- Founded: 1948

Architecture
- Functional status: Active
- Architect(s): David Rowland (original building), Dennis R. Holloway (1983 addition)
- Groundbreaking: June 16, 1963

The Unitarian Universalist Church of Boulder is a Unitarian Universalist ("UU") church in Boulder, Colorado.

In 2017, congregation members voted to become a sanctuary church and from December 2017 to March 2022, undocumented immigrant Ingrid Encalada Latorre lived in sanctuary within the church building prior to being pardoned by Colorado Governor Jared Polis and granted a stay of removal in 2021. The church was featured in the documentary "If I Could Stay/Si Pudiera Quedarme" on its role, among others, in the sanctuary movement. Encalada Latoree was one of more than 70 immigrants nationally who lived in sanctuary in churches during the first Trump presidency.

== The Unitarian Fellowship of Boulder ==
In 1883, Rev. Thomas J. Van Ness delivered his first sermon to Boulder’s First Unitarian Society. Van Ness accepted a call to the Denver Unitarian church in 1884, and the Boulder group never again had a long-term minister. It had disbanded by 1890.

On July 30, 1948, the American Unitarian Association granted the first-ever "Fellowship Charter" to the Unitarian Fellowship of Boulder. Granting that charter kicked off a two-decade expansion of Unitarians—the largest and most consequential period of growth in Unitarian history; a third of current-day congregations formed during the movement. The charter required no minister, but at least ten religiously liberal laypeople who expressed sympathy with the purposes of the American Unitarian Association, had bylaws, and made an ongoing financial commitment to the AUA. In 1958 the church reincorporated under the name "The Unitarian Church of Boulder" and in 1979 adopted the name "The Unitarian Universalist Church of Boulder."

The existing church building was constructed in 1963 by architect and a member of the congregation David Rowland. An addition in 1983 brought a passive solar expansion designed by architect Dennis R. Holloway. In the 1950s the church owned a parsonage for the use of their ministers, Bowen Ranch House at the foot of Davidson's Mesa on what is now South Vale Road, which was destroyed in the Marshall Fire long after having been sold by the congregation.

In 1979 a group of 49 members dissatisfied with the minister at the time broke off to form the Boulder Unitarian Universalist Fellowship, Boulder Valley Unitarian Universalist Fellowship to reflect its new location in East Boulder County.

In 2008, the UU Church of Boulder hired the first Developmental Minister in Unitarian Universalism. The Rev. Howell Lind served seven years in a capacity specifically aimed at changing and revitalizing the congregation—a move which at the time was unusual in the Unitarians' congregational polity. In 2014, it was named a "breakthrough congregation" by the Unitarian Universalist Association.

In 2026 the congregation partnered with Rodwin Architecture to develop an expansion to the building and a new master plan for the grounds.

== Settled ministers ==
- 1957–1962 – Thomas J. Maloney, part-time 1957-9, then fulltime
- 1964–1969 – Philip Pennington
- 1971–1993 – Forrest Whitman
- 1995–2000 – Kurt Kuhwald
- 2000–2005 – Jacqueline A. Ziegler
- 2008–2015 – Howell Lind (developmental minister)
- 2015–2019 – Kelly Dignan
- 2021–present – David Schwartz

== Notable members ==
- Len Ackland
- Wynn Bruce whose memorial service was hosted at the church
- David Hawkins (philosopher) who served on the Board when the congregation incorporated in 1949.
- Josie Heath
- Rollie Heath
- Pete Palmer
- Mary Rippon (in the congregation's earlier form)
- Joseph A. Sewall (in the congregation's earlier form)
- Omer Stewart (founding member)

== Photos ==
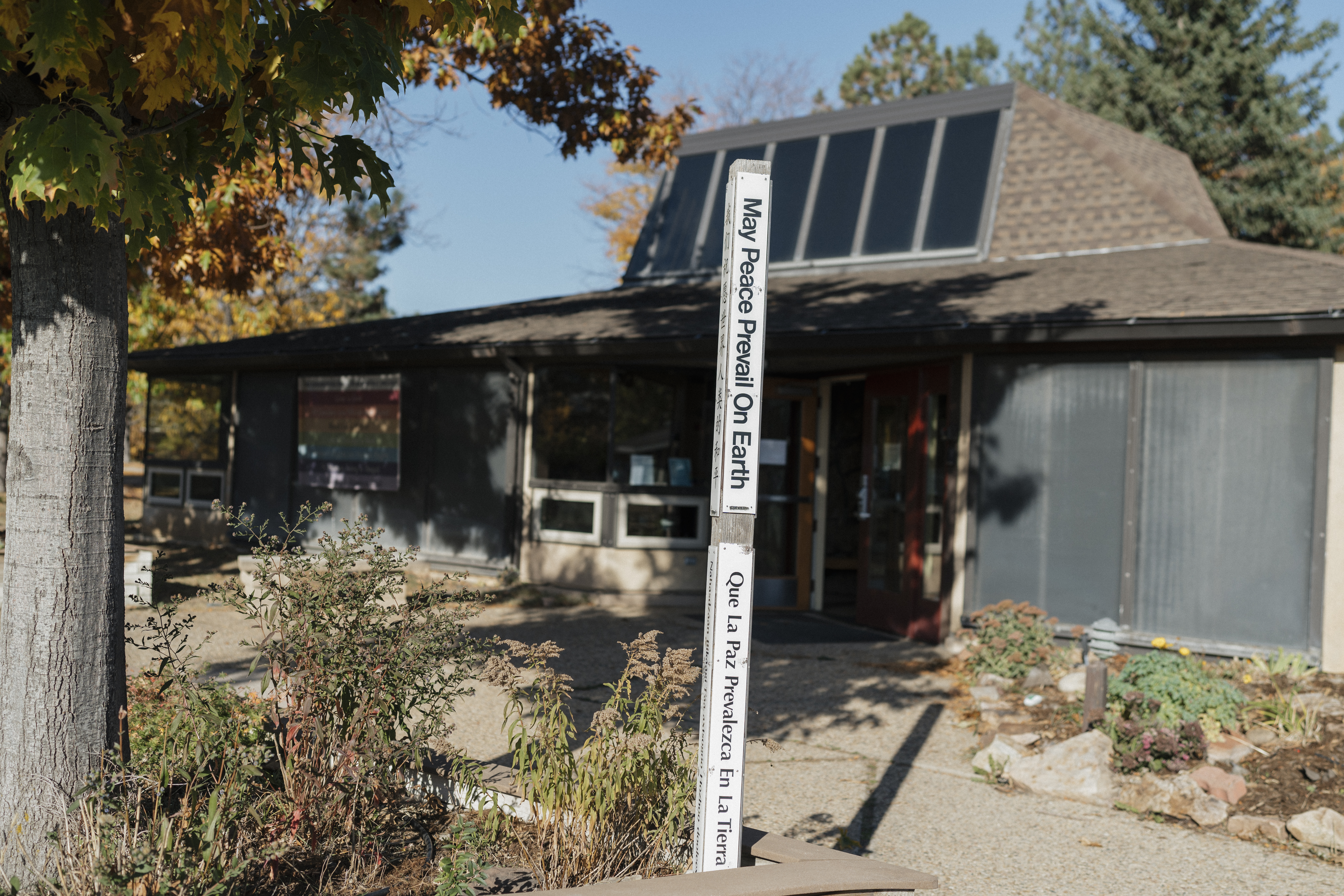
Looking north to the main entrance of the UU Church of Boulder in the Fall of 2024

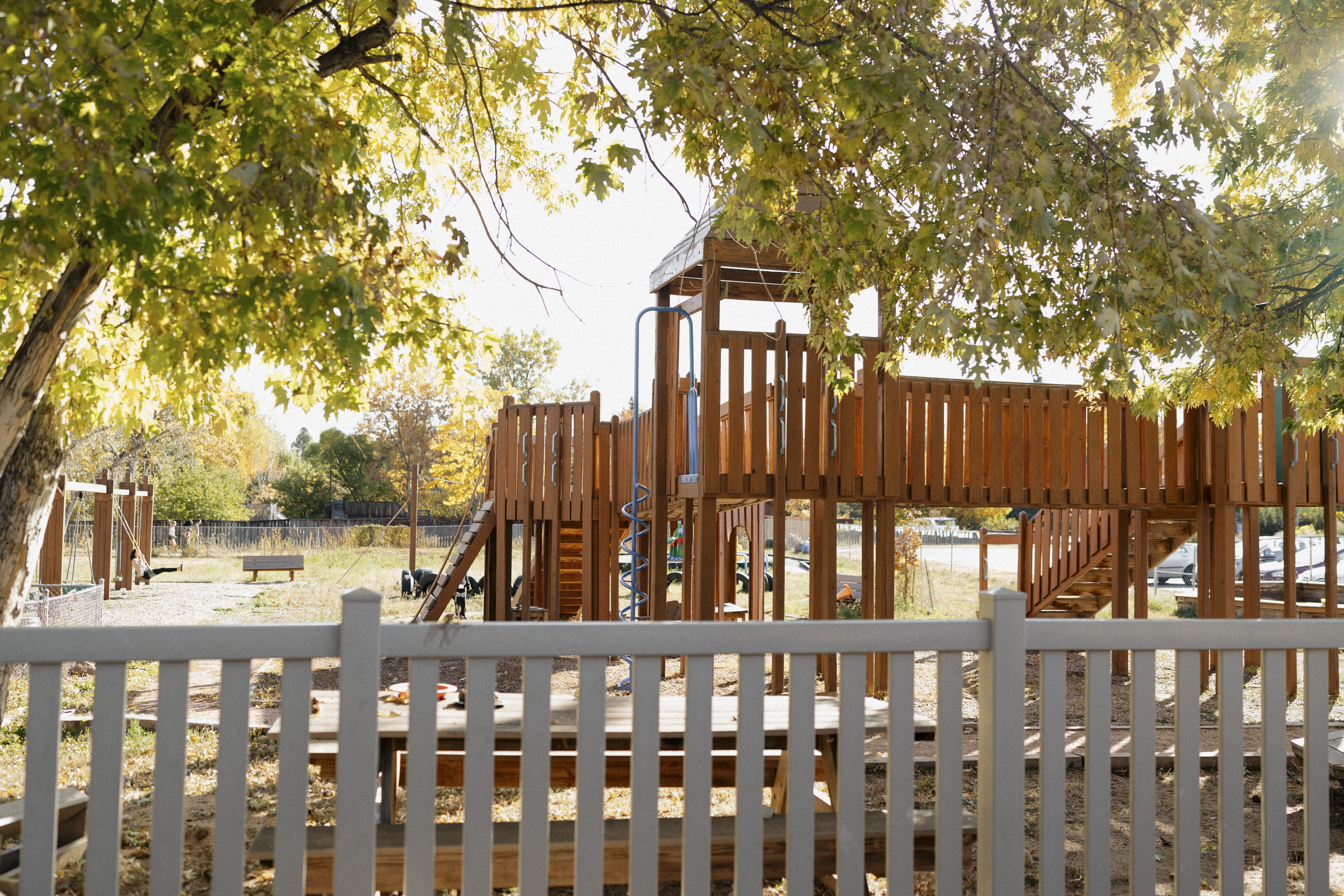
The gradeschool playground at the Unitarian Universalist Church of Boulder, Colorado

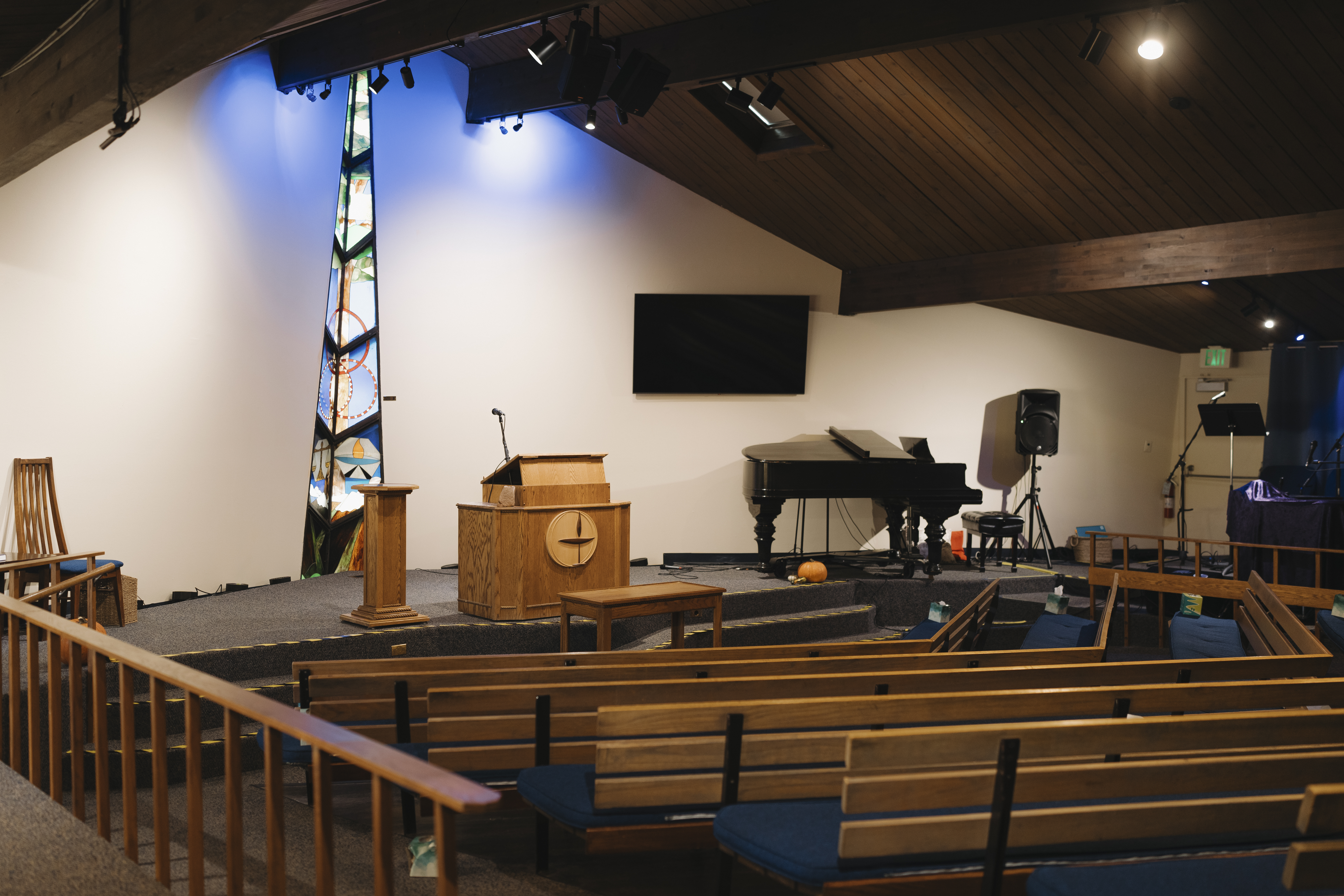
A view of the chancel and front half of the sanctuary of the UU Church of Boulder

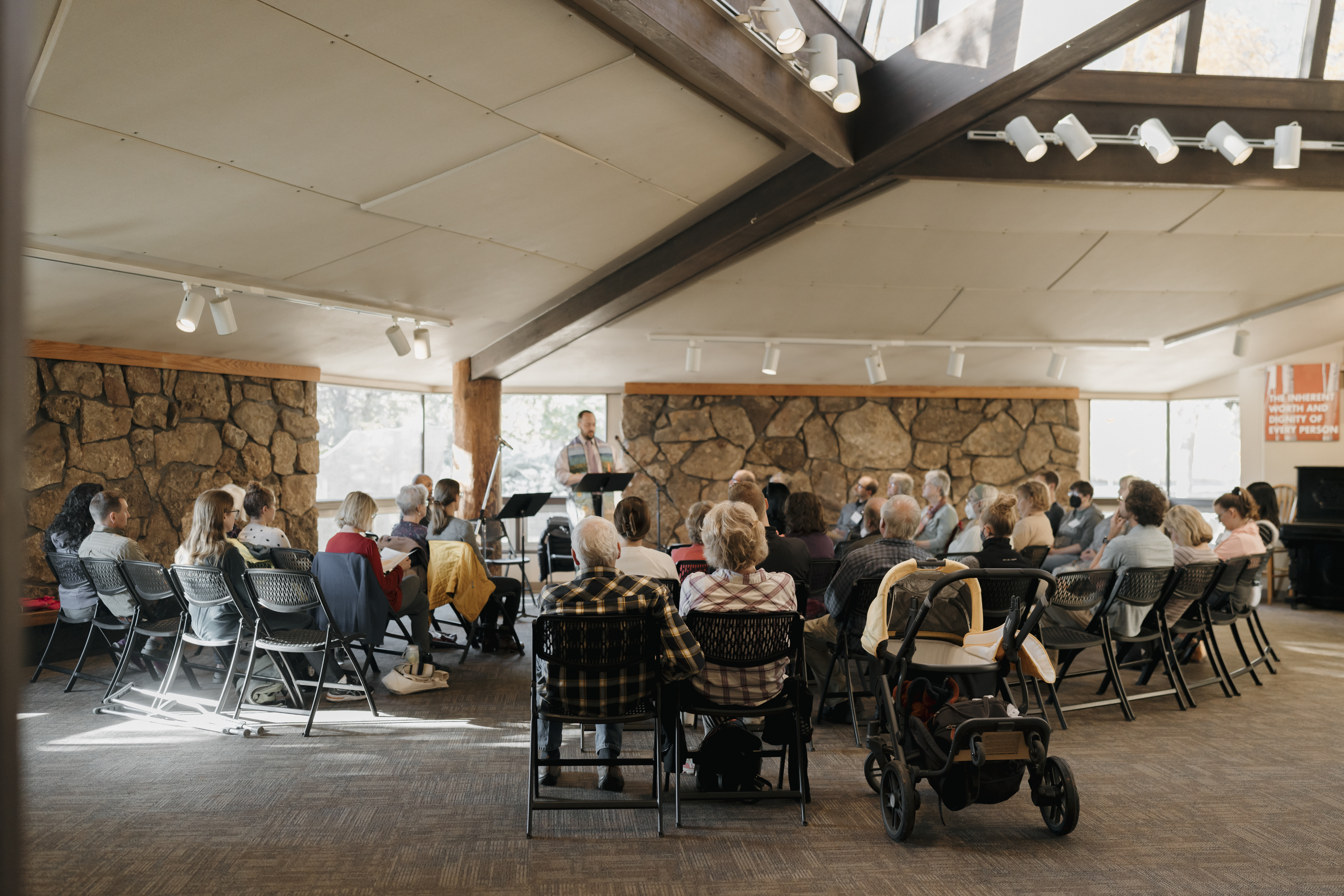
This 9:00 am worship service in the round is being held in the Sky Room at the UU Church of Boulder.
