= Lawrence Baca =

Native American attorney

- Born: 1950 (age 75–76)
- Citizenship: Pawnee Nation; United States
- Education: University of California, Santa Barbara; Harvard Law School
- Awards: Thurgood Marshall Award; Hon. Sarah T. Hughes Civil Rights Award

Lawrence Baca is a Native American attorney and was the deputy director of the Office of Tribal Justice with the United States Department of Justice.

== Early life ==
Lawrence Baca was born in Colorado in 1950 to a white mother and Pawnee Indian father. His family moved to San Diego, California in 1953. Baca and his family experienced prejudice, including a hate crime targeted at his father.

== Education ==
Baca enrolled at the University of San Diego but later transferred to the University of California, Santa Barbara where he graduated in 1973. Baca took advantage of the individual major program at UCSB and created his own major titled American Indian History and Culture. During his time in university Baca worked with inmates in the federal prison in Lompoc on preparing for parole hearings. After college Baca applied to law school and with a letter of recommendation from the chancellor of UCSB he was admitted to Harvard Law.

== Legal career ==
In 1976, Baca was the first American Indian lawyer to be hired at the United States Department of Justice through the Attorney General's Honor Law Program. He was also the first American Indian attorney ever hired into the Civil Rights Division. Later in life he taught at both Howard University School of Law and the American University College of Law. The Federal Bar Association created the Lawrence R Baca Lifetime Achievement Award for Baca's work in Federal Indian Law, it was created in 2008.

=== Important cases ===
Baca litigated many important civil rights cases on behalf of Native Americans including United States v. Great Western Bank & Trust, which gave Native Americans equal access to credit and in United States v. South Dakota and Fall River County he helped to ensure that Native Americans living on reservations had the right to run for public office.
