= Larry Nesper =

American anthropologist

Larry Nesper is an American anthropologist specializing in the Ojibwe (a.k.a. Chippewa) people of northern Wisconsin.

He received his Ph.D. in 1994 from the University of Chicago, where he studied with Raymond D. Fogelson.

He teaches anthropology at the University of Wisconsin, Madison. His son-in-law is Anders Holm.

== Selected bibliography ==
- "The trees will last forever: The integrity of their forest signifies the health of the Menominee people". Cultural Survival Quarterly. 17: 28–31. 1993.
- The Walleye War: The Struggle for Ojibwe Spearfishing and Treaty Rights. Lincoln: University of Nebraska Press. 2002. ISBN 9780803202290.
- Nesper, Larry (2003). "Simulating Culture: Being Indian for Tourists in Lac du Flambeau's Wa-Swa-Gon Indian Bowl". Ethnohistory. 50 (3): 447–472. doi:10.1215/00141801-50-3-447. Project MUSE 46713.
- "Negotiating Jurisprudence in Tribal Court and the Emergence of a Tribal State: The Lac du Flambeau Ojibwe". Current Anthropology. 48 (5): 675–699. 2007. doi:10.1086/520132.
- "The Politics of Cultural Revitalization and Intertribal Resource Management" in Michael E. Harkin; David Rich Lewis, eds. (2007). Native Americans and the Environment: Perspectives on the Ecological Indian. Lincoln: University of Nebraska Press. pp. 277–303. ISBN 9780803205666.
- Nesper, Larry (2011). "Law and Ojibwe Indian 'Traditional Cultural Property' in the Organized Resistance to the Crandon Mine in Wisconsin". Law & Social Inquiry. 36 (1): 151–169. doi:10.1111/j.1747-4469.2010.01227.x.
- Nesper, Larry (2012). "Twenty-five years of Ojibwe treaty rights in Wisconsin, Michigan, and Minnesota". American Indian Culture and Research Journal. 36 (1): 47–78. doi:10.17953/aicr.36.1.d371306148v13310 (inactive 31 January 2026).
- Tribal Worlds: Critical Studies in American Indian Nation Building. Albany: SUNY Press. 2013. ISBN 9781438446295. (as editor, with Brian Hosmer).
- Nesper, Larry (2015). "Ordering Legal Plurality: Allocating Jurisdiction in State and Tribal Courts in Wisconsin". PoLAR. 38 (1): 30–52. doi:10.1111/plar.12085.
- "Our Relations… The Mixed Bloods”: Indigenous Transformation and Dispossession in the Western Great Lakes. Albany: SUNY Press, 2021.
