= Gary Holton (linguist) =

American linguist

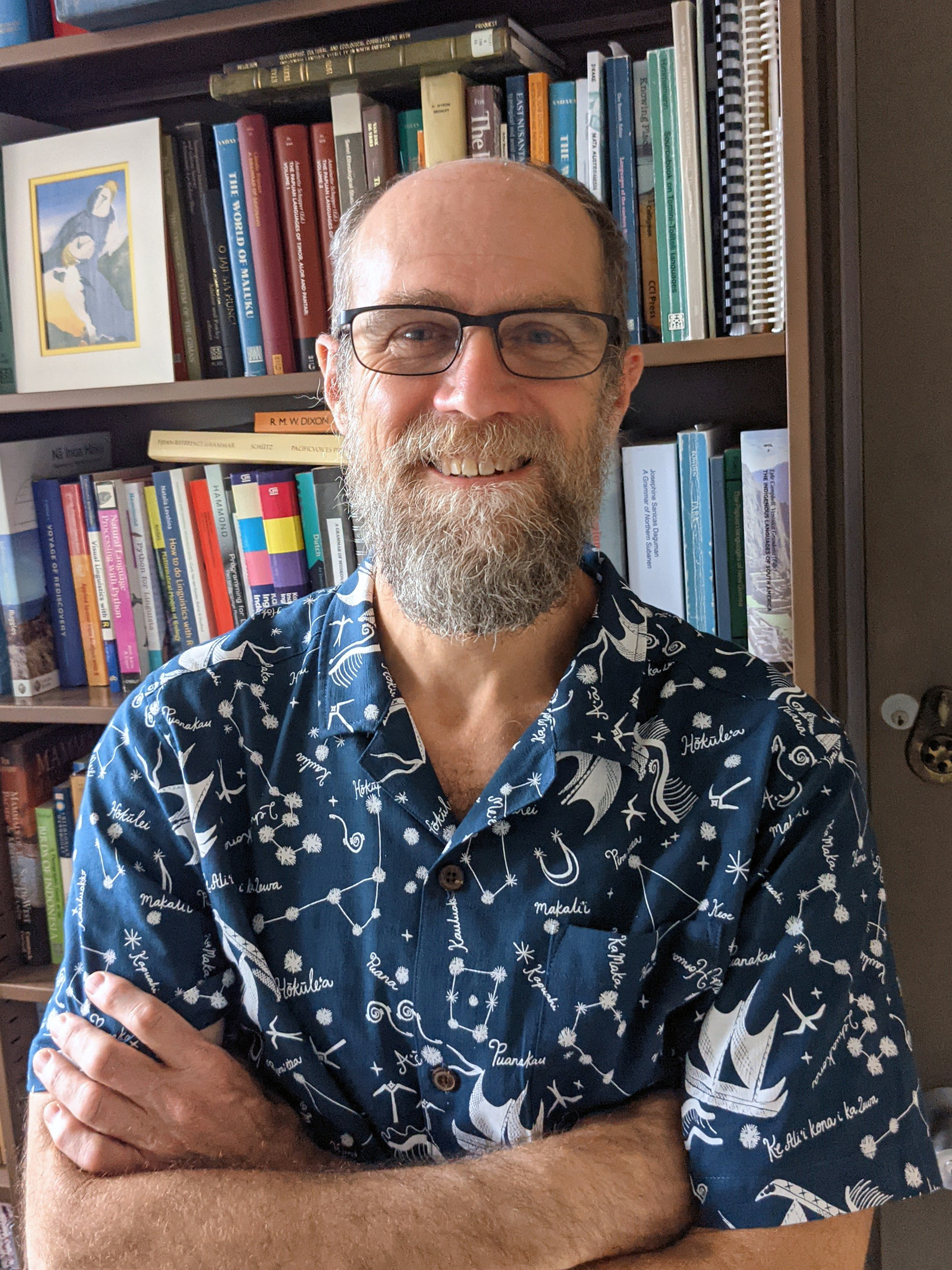
- Holton in 2023
- Occupation: Linguist

Academic background
- Education: University of California, Santa Barbara

Academic work
- Institutions: University of Hawaiʻi at Mānoa
- Main interests: Papuan languages, Athabaskan languages

Gary Holton is an American linguist who works on Athabaskan languages of Alaska and Papuan languages of eastern Indonesia. As of 2019, he is a professor in the Department of Linguistics at the University of Hawaiʻi at Mānoa.

He has bachelor's and master's degrees in mathematics. In 2000, he obtained a Ph.D. in linguistics at the University of California, Santa Barbara.

== Selected publications ==
- Landscape in Western Pantar, a Papuan outlier of southern Indonesia (2011)
- Sketch of Western Pantar (Lamma) (2014)
- A unified system of spatial orientation in the Austronesian and non-Austronesian languages of Halmahera (2017)
- Interdisciplinary language documentation (2018)
