= Elmer Harp Jr. =

American anthropologist and archeologist

Elmer Harp Jr. (April 13, 1913 – June 2, 2009) was an American anthropologist and archeologist, specializing in the study of Inuit cultures in Northern and Northwestern Canada. He was a professor at Dartmouth College, and also co-founded their Department of Anthropology.

== Early life and education ==
Elmer Harp Jr. was born in Cleveland, Ohio. He became interested in anthropology during his first years at Harvard College, but the Great Depression caused him to take a break from his studies. During that time he took engineering courses at the Case School of Applied Science in Cleveland, and he returned to Harvard College in 1938, graduating with a B.S. in anthropology. After graduating he briefly worked for the Lincoln Electric Company as an engineer. Harp joined the U.S. Navy during World War II, and was the captain of a PT boat while stationed in the Mediterranean and Pacific. Once the war ended, Harp returned to Harvard University, and earned his M.A. in anthropology in 1947, and Ph.D. in 1953. He also studied the Russian language while taking courses in the Russian Area program at Harvard.

== Career ==
Harp worked and taught at Dartmouth College throughout his life, starting as the curator of anthropology at the College Museum from 1947 to 1952. He was a professor of anthropology from 1957 to 1978. He co-founded the Department of Anthropology at Dartmouth with Robert McKennan in 1963, and served as chairman of the program during 1960–1972. He also served as the director of the College Museum from 1961 to 1968.

The archeological work Harp conducted throughout his life focused on the origins of ancient Inuit culture throughout the Northern Canadian Provinces and Territories, including the Strait of Belle Isle, Newfoundland and Labrador, Hudson Bay, and the Belcher Islands. Harp is notable for his archeological work involved with linking the origins of Dorset culture to the Central Canadian Arctic and Alaska.
