= John Zoe =

John Zoe is a Tli Cho statesman. Zoe was chief negotiator for the Dogrib Treaty 11 and instrumental in the ratification of the Tli Cho self-government agreement in 2005. He was the CEO for Tli Cho First Nation until July 2009.

Zoe is an expert on Tli Cho history and culture, and participated in the development of the Behchoko Community Teacher Education Program which incorporates that history and culture into educational curriculum.
