= James W. VanStone =

American anthropologist (1925–2001)

James W. VanStone (October 3, 1925 – February 28, 2001) was an American cultural anthropologist specializing in the group of peoples then known as Eskimos (now Inuit, Iñupiat, and Yup'ik). He studied at the University of Pennsylvania and was a student of Frank Speck and Alfred Irving Hallowell. One of his first positions was at the Field Museum of Natural History in Chicago. In 1951, following completion of graduate studies, he joined the faculty of the Department of Anthropology at the University of Alaska in Fairbanks. In 1955 and 1956, he conducted fieldwork with the Inuit at Point Hope, Alaska. Beginning in the summer of 1960, he started field work among Chipewyan Indians (First Nations), living along the east shore of Great Slave Lake in Canada's Northwest Territories among eastern Athapaskans for a period of eleven months over three years. He died of heart failure.

== Published works ==
- Darnell, Regna (2006) "Keeping the Faith: A Legacy of Native American Ethnography, Ethnohistory, and Psychology." In: New Perspectives on Native North America: Cultures, Histories, and Representations, ed. by Sergei A. Kan and Pauline Turner Strong, pp. 3–16. Lincoln: University of Nebraska Press.

Many of the following are available on-line from Archive.org:

- The ethnoarcheology of Crow Village, Alaska, by Wendell H. Oswalt and James W. VanStone. Washington, U.S. Govt. Print. Off., 1967.
- Eskimos of the Nushagak River; an ethnographic history, by James W. VanStone. Seattle, University of Washington Press [1967]
- Preliminary report of archaeological field work in southwest Alaska, 1966. [S.l. : s.n., 1966?]
- The changing culture of the Snowdrift Chipewyan, by James W. VanStone. Ottawa [Queen's Printer] 1965.
- The Snowdrift Chipewyan. Ottawa, Canada : Northern Coordination and Research Centre, Dept. of Northern Affairs and National Resources, 1963.
- An archaeological collection from Somerset Island and Boothia Peninsula, N.W.T. [by] James W. VanStone. A contribution to the human osteology of the Canadian Arctic [by] J. E. Anderson and C. F. Merbs. [Toronto, 1962]
- Point Hope : an Eskimo village in transition / by James W. Vanstone. Seattle, Wash. : University of Washington Press, 1962.
- The economy of a frontier community : a preliminary statement / by James W. VanStone. Ottawa, Canada : Dept. of Northern Affairs and National Resources, Northern Co-ordination and Research Centre, 1961.
- VanStone, James W. Point Hope: An Eskimo Village in Transition. Seattle: University of Washington Press. 1962
- Point Hope : an Eskimo community in northwest Alaska / James W. VanStone. [Fairbanks] : Alaskan Air Command, Arctic Aeromedical Laboratory, 1961.
- The Caribou Eskimos of Eskimo Point / J.W. Vanstone, W. Oswalt. [Ottawa, Canada?] : Northern Co-ordination and research Centre, Dept. of Northern Affairs and National Resources [1959?]
- Athapaskan adaptations : hunters and fishermen of the subarctic forests / James W. VanStone. Arlington Heights, Ill. : AHM, c1974.
- Cultures of the Bering Sea region : papers from an international symposium / edited by Henry N. Michael and James W. VanStone. New York, N.Y. (655 Third Ave., New York 10017) : IREX, International Research & Exchanges Board,
- Archaeological excavations at Kotzebue, Alaska / James W. VanStone. [1954]

=== Monographs published by the Field Museum ===
VanStone wrote, edited, and contributed to several monographs published by the Field Museum in the Fieldiana: Anthropology series:

- Dumond, Don E.; VanStone, James W. (August 31, 1995). Paugvik: A Nineteenth-Century Native Village on Bristol Bay, Alaska. Fieldiana: Anthropology (new series). Vol. 24. JSTOR 29782615.
- Lucier, Charles V.; VanStone, James W. (July 31, 1992). Historic Pottery of the Kotzebue Sound Iñupiat. Fieldiana: Anthropology (new series). Vol. 18. JSTOR 29782591.
- ———; ——— (October 31, 1995). Traditional Beluga Drives of the Iñupiat of Kotzebue Sound, Alaska. Fieldiana: Anthropology (new series). Vol. 25. JSTOR 29782619.
- Kashevarov, A. F. (September 28, 1977). VanStone, James W. (ed.). A. F. Kashevarov's Coastal Explorations in Northwest Alaska, 1838. Fieldiana: Anthropology. Vol. 69. Translated by Kraus, David H. JSTOR 29782496.
- Khromchenko, V. S. (November 23, 1973). VanStone, James W. (ed.). V. S. Khromchenko's Coastal Explorations in Southwestern Alaska, 1822. Fieldiana: Anthropology. Vol. 63. Translated by Kraus, David H. JSTOR 29782465.
- Nelson, Edward William (April 28, 1978). VanStone, James W. (ed.). E. W. Nelson's Notes on the Indians of the Yukon and Innoko Rivers, Alaska. Fieldiana: Anthropology. Vol. 70. JSTOR 29782500.
- Simeone, William E.; VanStone, James W. (November 28, 1986). "And He Was Beautiful": Contemporary Athapaskan Material Culture in the Collections of Field Museum of Natural History. Fieldiana: Anthropology (new series). Vol. 10. JSTOR 29782559.
- VanStone, James W. (March 15, 1968). An Annotated Ethnohistorical Bibliography of the Nushagak River Region, Alaska. Fieldiana: Anthropology. Vol. 54. JSTOR 29782415.
- ——— (October 14, 1968). Tikchik Village: A Nineteenth Century Riverine Community in Southwestern Alaska. Fieldiana: Anthropology. Vol. 56. JSTOR 29782431.
- ——— (October 16, 1970). Akulivikchuk: A Nineteenth Century Eskimo Village on the Nushagak River, Alaska. Fieldiana: Anthropology. Vol. 60. JSTOR i29782445.
- ——— (February 25, 1971). Historic Settlement Patterns in the Nushagak River Region, Alaska. Fieldiana: Anthropology. Vol. 61. JSTOR 29782451.
- ——— (March 17, 1972). Nushagak: an Historic Trading Center in Southwestern Alaska. Fieldiana: Anthropology. Vol. 62. JSTOR 29782455.
- ——— (December 27, 1972). The First Peary Collection of Polar Eskimo Material Culture. Fieldiana: Anthropology. Vol. 63. JSTOR 29782460.
- ——— (November 26, 1976). The Bruce Collection of Eskimo Material Culture from Port Clarence, Alaska. Fieldiana: Anthropology. Vol. 67. JSTOR 29782488.
- ——— (March 29, 1979). Ingalik Contact Ecology: An Ethnohistory of the Lower-Middle Yukon, 1790–1935. Fieldiana: Anthropology. Vol. 71. JSTOR 29782504.
- ——— (March 30, 1979). Historic Ingalik Settlements Along the Yukon, Innoko, and Anvik Rivers, Alaska. Fieldiana: Anthropology. Vol. 72. JSTOR 29782508.
- ——— (February 25, 1980). The Bruce Collection of Eskimo Material Culture from Kotzebue Sound, Alaska. Fieldiana: Anthropology (new series). Vol. 1. JSTOR 29782523.
- ——— (December 23, 1981). Athapaskan Clothing and Related Objects in the Collections of Field Museum of Natural History. Fieldiana: Anthropology (new series). Vol. 4. JSTOR 29782535.
- ——— (October 29, 1982). The Speck Collection of Montagnais Material Culture from the Lower St. Lawrence Drainage, Quebec. Fieldiana: Anthropology (new series). Vol. 5. JSTOR 29782539.
- ——— (March 30, 1983). The Simms Collection of Plains Cree Material Culture from Southeastern Saskatchewan. Fieldiana: Anthropology (new series). Vol. 6. JSTOR 29782543.
- ——— (January 31, 1985). Material Culture of the Davis Inlet and Barren Ground Naskapi: The William Duncan Strong Collection. Fieldiana: Anthropology (new series). Vol. 7. JSTOR 29782543.
- ——— (August 30, 1985). An Ethnographic Collection from Northern Sakhalin Island. Fieldiana: Anthropology (new series). Vol. 8. JSTOR 29782551.
- ——— (April 29, 1988). The Simms Collection of Southwestern Chippewa Material Culture. Fieldiana: Anthropology (new series). Vol. 11. JSTOR 29782563.
- ——— (October 31, 1989). Indian Trade Ornaments in the Collections of Field Museum of Natural History. Fieldiana: Anthropology (new series). Vol. 13. JSTOR 29782571.
- ——— (May 31, 1990). The Nordenskiöld Collection of Eskimo Material Culture from Port Clarence, Alaska. Fieldiana: Anthropology (new series). Vol. 14. JSTOR 29782575.
- ——— (September 30, 1991). The Isaac Cowie Collection of Plains Cree Material Culture from Central Alberta. Fieldiana: Anthropology (new series). Vol. 17. JSTOR 29782587.
- ——— (October 30, 1992). Material Culture of the Blackfoot (Blood) Indians of Southern Alberta. Fieldiana: Anthropology (new series). Vol. 19. JSTOR 29782595.
- ——— (May 28, 1993). Material Culture of the Chilcotin Athapaskans of West Central British Columbia: Collections in the Field Museum of Natural History. Fieldiana: Anthropology (new series). Vol. 20. JSTOR 29782599.
- ——— (February 28, 1994). The Noice Collection of Copper Inuit Material Culture. Fieldiana: Anthropology (new series). Vol. 22. JSTOR 29782607.
- ——— (June 28, 1996). Ethnographic Collections from the Assiniboine and Yanktonia Sioux in the Field Museum of Natural History. Fieldiana: Anthropology (new series). Vol. 26. JSTOR 29782623.
- ——— (June 28, 1996). The Cherry Collection of Deg Hit'an (Ingalik) Material Culture. Fieldiana: Anthropology (new series). Vol. 27. JSTOR 29782627.
- ——— (August 29, 1997). An Ethnographic Collection from the Northern Ute in the Field Museum of Natural History. Fieldiana: Anthropology (new series). Vol. 28. JSTOR 29782631.
- ——— (May 29, 1998). Mesquakie (Fox) Material Culture: The William Jones and Frederick Starr Collections. Fieldiana: Anthropology (new series). Vol. 30. JSTOR 29782639.
- VanStone, James W.; Lucier, Charles V. (September 30, 1974). "An Early Archaeological Example of Tattooing from Northwestern Alaska". Fieldiana: Anthropology. 66 (1). JSTOR 29782481.
- VanStone, James W.; Townsend, Joan B. (January 16, 1970). Kijik: An Historic Tanaina Indian Settlement. Fieldiana: Anthropology. Vol. 59. JSTOR i29782441.
