= Michael M. Ames =

Canadian academic (1933–2006)

- Born: June 19, 1933; Vancouver, British Columbia, Canada
- Died: February 20, 2006 (aged 72)
- Awards: Order of Canada

Michael M. Ames, CM FRSC (June 19, 1933 – February 20, 2006) was a Canadian academic and Professor of Anthropology of the department of anthropology-sociology at the University of British Columbia.

== Life ==
He was born in Vancouver, British Columbia, he received a B.A. in anthropology from the University of British Columbia in 1956. He received his Ph.D. in social anthropology from Harvard University in 1961. From 1962 to 1964, he was an assistant professor of sociology at McMaster University. He started at the University of British Columbia as assistant professor in 1964 and became a full professor in 1970.

From 1974 to 1997, he was director of the Museum of Anthropology at the University of British Columbia. From 2002 to 2004, he was also the acting director.

In 1998, he was made a Member of the Order of Canada. He was elected a Fellow of the Royal Society of Canada in 1979 and made a Fellow of the Society for Applied Anthropology in 1996. He was a Guggenheim Fellow in 1970.

== Legacy ==
The Council for Museum Anthropology awards the Michael M. Ames Prize.

== Works ==
- Ames, Michael M. (1992). Cannibal tours and glass boxes : the anthropology of museums (2nd rev. ed.). Vancouver [B.C.]: UBC Press. ISBN 0-7748-0391-6. OCLC 144143922.
- Ames, Michael M. (1986). Museums, the public and anthropology. [S.l.]: Concept Publishing Co. ISBN 81-7022-125-0. OCLC 948881196.
