= C. Matthew Snipp =

American sociologist

- Occupation: Sociologist
- Known for: Research on Native Americans in the United States
- Title: The Burnet C. and Mildred Finley Wohlford Professor of Humanities and Sciences in the Department of Sociology

Academic background
- Education: University of Wisconsin, Madison (Ph.D.)
- Thesis: The Structure of Mobility: An Alternative Approach to the Study of Social Mobility and Achievement. (1981)

Academic work
- Discipline: Sociology
- Institutions: Stanford University

C. Matthew Snipp is an American sociologist and demographer. He is currently the Burnet C. and Mildred Finley Wohlford Professor of Humanities and Sciences at Stanford University. He has made contributions to the field of race and ethnicity studies, particularly in understanding the social dynamics of racial and ethnic classification and racial inequality.

== Career ==
After completing his Ph.D. at the University of Wisconsin-Madison in 1981, Snipp joined the Sociology department at the University of Maryland-College Park as an assistant professor. There, he began his research focusing on the demography of American Indians and Alaska Natives. Snipp’s research provided empirical evidence that a group widely considered a distinctive racial group, American Indians and Alaska Natives, displayed exceptional population growth that could only be explained by persons changing their self-identified racial heritage from one census to the next.

In 1988, Snipp moved to the Rural Sociology department (now the Department of Community and Environmental Sociology) at the University of Wisconsin-Madison where he continued to study American Indian and Alaska Native demography and sociology.

In 1989, Snipp authored the first book-length study of American Indian and Alaska Native demography published as American Indians: The First of This Land.

Snipp moved to Stanford University in 1996 where his research interests broadened to include subjects like racial measurement, and economic inequality across a range of different racial and ethnic groups.

From 2008 to 2011, Snipp served as the director of Stanford’s Center for Comparative Studies on Race and Ethnicity. In 2013, Snipp and a Stanford colleague, David Grassy launched a project that would become known as The American Opportunity Study (AOS). The AOS aimed to study social mobility by linking decennial census files from 1940 to the present. This project was subsequently incorporated into the U.S. Census Bureau’s research and development program and renamed the Decennial Census Digitization and Linkage Project.

Since 2019, Snipp has been serving as the Vice Provost for Faculty Development, Diversity and Engagement at Stanford.
