= Omer Stewart =

American cultural anthropologist (1908–1991)

Omer Call Stewart (August 17, 1908 – December 31, 1991) was an American cultural anthropologist and author who worked at the University of Colorado. He was a student of Alfred L. Kroeber. He defended Native American land claims and advocated for tribes legal use of peyote.

== Early life ==
Stewart was born in Provo, Utah on August 17, 1908, one of seven children of John Riggs Stewart and Esther (née Call) Stewart. He graduated from high school in Salt Lake City and from 1928 to 1930 he went on a two-year mission for the Church of Jesus Christ of Latter-day Saints to Switzerland and France. In 1932, he graduated from the University of Utah. In 1940, he received his doctorate in anthropology from the University of California, Berkeley.

== Career and military service ==
Following graduation, Stewart was an educator at the University of Minnesota and University of Texas. He served in the Middle East as an undercover agent and at The Pentagon as an intelligence officer.

After the war, in 1945, he took what became a long-term position at University of Colorado in Boulder, including heading the Anthropology department. He was an expert on Native American culture, particularly regarding the use of peyote in religious rituals across Native American tribes. He testified in trials as an expert witness regarding non-payment for appropriate tribal lands by the government and peyote use. Stewart was a member of the Society for Applied Anthropology, Society of American Archaeology, and American Anthropological Association. He retired from the university in 1973. He continued to conduct research for the rest of his life. An archive of his papers are held at the University of Colorado Libraries.

== Personal life ==
He and his wife, Lenore, had four children, Carl, Stephen, Kate, and a daughter who died before him, Ann. He and Lenore were founding members of the Unitarian Universalist Church of Boulder. Stewart died on December 31, 1991, at the Boulder Community Hospital.

== Publications ==
- Edward Winslow Gifford; Julian Haynes Steward; Omer Call Stewart (1940). Nevada Shoshoni. University of California Press.
- Omer Call Stewart (1951). Burning and natural vegetation in the United States. American Geographical Society.
- Omer Call Stewart (1943). Notes on Pomo Ethnogeography. University of California Press.
- Omer Call Stewart (1955). Fire as the First Great Force Employed by Man.
- Omer Call Stewart (written in 1957, published in 2002). Forgotten fires: Native Americans and the transient wilderness. University of Oklahoma Press. ISBN 0-8061-3423-2
- Omer Call Stewart (1964). Tribal Distributions and Boundaries in the Great Basin.
- Martha C. Knack; Omer Call Stewart (1984). As Long as the River Shall Run: An Ethnohistory of Pyramid Lake Indian Reservation. University of Nevada Press. ISBN 978-0-87417-334-5.
- Omer Call Stewart (1987). Peyote Religion: A History. University of Oklahoma Press. ISBN 978-0-8061-2457-5.

== See also ==
- Native American Church
