= Natalie Munro =

American anthropologist

- Education: Southern Methodist University; Simon Fraser University; University of Arizona
- Occupations: Anthropologist and professor

Natalie Munro is an American anthropologist and professor, specializing in zooarchaeology, the study of animal remains found at archaeological sites. She is known for her research on the critical transition from hunter-gatherer to agrarian societies, which took place between 15,000 and 7,500 years ago. Munro's work primarily focuses on early human communities in southwest Asia, particularly in Israel, Turkey, and Greece.

== Education ==
Munro studied at the Southern Methodist University, where she initially majored in biology. During her junior year, she took her first anthropology courses, which prompted her to switch her major to anthropology, later specializing in zooarchaeology. She graduated with an MA from Simon Fraser University and a PhD from University of Arizona.

== Career ==
Munro's research examines the time period when societies transitioned from hunter-gatherer to agrarian lifestyles, a shift that had significant impacts on human health, the environment, population size, private property, social stratification, inequality, and organized religion. By analyzing animal remains, Munro can reconstruct human behavior, shedding light on the reasons behind the adoption of agriculture and animal domestication.

Munro primarily works in southwest Asia, where agriculture first emerged approximately 10,000 years ago. Her work has contributed to understanding the early stirrings of animal management and the complex story of human history, challenging previous views that agriculture and animal husbandry arose exclusively in southeastern Anatolia.

Her research encompasses two main archaeological projects: one in Israel, focusing on the period just before agriculture began, and another in Turkey, examining early Neolithic communities that were settling down and domesticating animals more formally.

=== Research contributions ===
Munro's work has provided evidence that contradicts an earlier view that agriculture and animal husbandry arose exclusively in an area of southeastern Anatolia and spread outward from there. Instead, her findings suggest that early experimentation with agricultural practices occurred in diverse geographic areas, contributing to a more complex understanding of human history.

Through her research, Munro has studied early fishing techniques, community organization, sharing practices, hygiene, and rituals. Her work in Turkey has revealed the contrast between neighboring communities at the same historical time, with one village showing evidence of a more settled-down society with early agricultural practices and the other resembling earlier hunter-gatherers.
