= Douglas H. Ubelaker =

American forensic anthropologist

Douglas H. Ubelaker (born 1946) is an American forensic anthropologist. He works as a curator for the Smithsonian Institution, and has published numerous papers and monographs that have helped establish modern procedures in forensic anthropology. He has also done work in Latin America, with Native Americans, and has assisted the Federal Bureau of Investigation in forensic cases.

== Biography ==
Ubelaker was born August 23, 1946, in Horton, Kansas.

Ubelaker became interested in anthropology after working with Dr. Bill Bass on an American Indian project in the Dakotas. He received his B.A. from the University of Kansas in 1968.

Ubelaker spent 1969 to 1971 in the United States Army, serving as a military policeman and then as a microbiology technician. Working as a technician connected him with the National Museum of Natural History and eventually led to his employment at the Smithsonian Institution in Washington, D.C.

In 1973, Ubelaker received his Ph.D. from the University of Kansas. He is also board certified in forensic anthropology by the American Board of Forensic Anthropology. He then returned to Washington, D.C., to work in the position formerly held by T. Dale Stewart at the National Museum of Natural History. He also teaches a forensic anthropology course at The George Washington University.
