= Michael E. Harkin =

Michael Eugene Harkin (August 16, 1958, to August 2, 2026) was one of the leading anthropologists in the United States specializing in the ethnohistory of indigenous people of the western U.S. and Canada. At the time of his death, he was professor emeritus and former chair of anthropology at the University of Wyoming, having previously taught at Emory University and Montana State University. In 2011 he was Fulbright Distinguished Chair in Cultural Studies at the Karl-Franzens University in Graz, Austria, and in 2007 he was a visiting professor at Shanghai University.

From 1985 to 1987 he conducted fieldwork in the Heiltsuk community of Bella Bella, British Columbia. More recently he worked with the Nuu-chah-nulth (formerly referred to as "Nootka") people of Vancouver Island, and several groups of the northern Great Plains.

He received his Ph.D. in 1988 from the University of Chicago, where he studied with Raymond D. Fogelson, Nancy Munn, and Marshall Sahlins.

His early monograph on the Heiltsuks employed a dialogic perspective to understand issues of power and representation of both self and other. This was influenced by Lévi-Straussian structuralism and the historical structuralism of Sahlins. In more recent works, he pursued a range of interests, primarily in the analysis of indigenous culture in a historical context. His work on revitalization movements revisits one of the classic ethnohistorical theories. He also contributed to the literature on ethnoecology, arguing that traditional Northwest Coast ecological models expressed via ritual and myth non-linear system dynamics.

He was co-editor of the journal Ethnohistory in 2007–2013, and served as editor-in-chief of the journal Reviews in Anthropology. He was theme editor for cultural anthropology of UNESCO's Encyclopedia of Life Support Systems, and wrote a column titled The World is Curved for the journal Anthropology News. He was president of the Society for Humanistic Anthropology in 2006–2008, and in 2013 was elected president of the American Society for Ethnohistory (for 2014–2015).

He edited several important books on Native Americans and the environment, revitalization movements, and Northwest Coast ethnology. He published extensively on anthropological history and theory, especially the Boasian tradition, and the structuralism of Claude Lévi-Strauss. He was a visiting fellow in Lévi-Strauss' laboratory in 1997.

He was the 2016 William Evans chair at the University of Otago in Dunedin, New Zealand.

== Bibliography ==
- Harkin, Michael E. (1993) Power and Progress: The Evangelical Dialogue among the Heiltsuk. Ethnohistory 40(1):1-33.
- Harkin, Michael E. (1994) Contested Bodies: Affliction and Power in Heiltsuk History and Culture. American Ethnologist 20(4):586-605.
- Harkin, Michael E. (1995) Modernist Anthropology and Tourism of the Authentic. Annals of Tourism Research 22(3):650-70.
- Harkin, Michael E. (1996) Carnival and Authority: Heiltsuk Schemata of Power in Ritual Discourse. Ethos 24(2):281-313.
- Harkin, Michael E. and Sergei Kan (eds.) (1996) Native American Women's Responses to Christianity. Ethnohistory 43(4).
- Harkin, Michael E. (1997) The Heiltsuks: Dialogues of Culture and History on the Northwest Coast. Lincoln and London: University of Nebraska Press.
- Harkin, Michael E. (1998) Whales, Chiefs, and Giants: An exploration into Nuu-chah-nulth Political Thought. Ethnology 37(4):317-32.
- Harkin, Michael E. (2001) "Ethnographic Deep Play: Boas, McIlwraith, and Fictive Adoption on the Northwest Coast." In Strangers to Relatives: The Adoption and Naming of Anthropologists in Native North America, ed. by Sergei Kan, pp. 57–79. Lincoln and London: University of Nebraska Press.
- Harkin, Michael E. (2001) Potlatch in Anthropology, In International Encyclopedia of the Social and Behavioral Sciences, Neil J. Smelser and Paul B. Baltes, (eds.) vol. 17, pp. 11,885-11,889. Oxford: Pergamon Press.
- Kornfeld, Marcel, Michael Harkin, and Jonathan Durr (2001) Landscapes and Peopling of the Americas. In On Being First: Cultural Innovation and Environmental Consequences of First Peopling, Proceedings of the 31st Annual Chacmool Conference, Jason Gillespie, Susan Tupakka, and Christy de Mille (eds.) pp. 149–162.
- Harkin, Michael E. (2002) (Dis)pleasures of the Text: Boasian Anthropology on the Northwest Coast. In Gateways: Exploring the Legacy of the Jesup North Pacific Expedition, 1897-1902, Contributions to Circumpolar Anthropology, v. 1. Igor Krupnik and William Fitzhugh (eds.) pp. 93–106. Washington, DC: Arctic Studies Center, Smithsonian Institution.
- Harkin, Michael E. (2003) Staged Encounters: Indians and Tourism. Ethnohistory 50(3):573-583.
- Harkin, Michael E. (2003) Feeling and Thinking in Memory and Forgetting: Towards an Ethnohistory of the Emotions. Ethnohistory 50(2):261-284.
- Mauzé, Marie, Michael E. Harkin, and Sergei Kan (eds.) (2004) Coming to Shore: Northwest Coast Ethnology, Traditions, and Visions. Lincoln and London: University of Nebraska Press.
- Harkin, Michael E. (2004) Northwest Coast Sacred Places. Acta Americana 12(2):5-13.
- Harkin, Michael E., 2004, Lévi-Strauss en Amérique : L’ « indigénisation» du Structuralisme. In Claude Lévi-Strauss Michel Izard (ed.) pp. 373–382. Paris: Éditions de l’Herne.
- Harkin, Michael E. (ed.) (2004) Reassessing Revitalization Movements: Perspectives from North America and the Pacific Islands, foreword by Anthony F.C. Wallace. Lincoln and London: University of Nebraska Press.
- Harkin, Michael E. (2005) The House of Longing: Missionary-led Changes in Heiltsuk Domestic Forms and Structures. In Indigenous Peoples and Religious Change, Peggy Brock (ed.) pp. 205–226. Leiden: Brill.
- Harkin, Michael E. (2006) ‘I’m an Old Cow Hand on the Banks of the Seine’: Representations of Indians and Le Far West in Parisian Commercial Culture. In New Perspectives on Native North America: Cultures, Histories and Representations, Sergei Kan and Pauline Turner Strong (eds.) pp. 815–846. Lincoln and London: University of Nebraska Press.
- Harkin, Michael E. and David Rich Lewis (eds.) (2007) Native Americans and the Environment: Perspectives on the Ecological Indian. Lincoln and London: University of Nebraska Press.
- Harkin, Michael E. (2007) Performing Paradox: Narrativity and the Lost Colony of Roanoke. In Myth and Memory: Rethinking Stories of Indigenous-European Contact, John Lutz (ed.) pp. 103–117. Vancouver: University of British Columbia Press.
- Harkin, Michael E. (2008) The Floating Island: Anachronism and Paradox in The Lost Colony. In Small Worlds: Method, Meaning, and Narrative in Microhistory, James F. Brooks, Christopher R. DeCorse, and John Walton (eds.) pp. 121–44. Santa Fe: SAR Press.
- Whitehead, Neil and Michael E. Harkin (eds.) (2009) Anthropology of Violence. Anthropology and Humanism 34(1).
- Harkin, Michael E. (2009) Lévi-Strauss and History. In The Cambridge Companion to Claude Lévi-Strauss, Boris Wiseman (ed.), pp. 39–58. Cambridge: Cambridge University Press.
- Harkin, Michael E. (2010) Ethnohistory's Ethnohistory: Creating a Discipline from the Ground Up. Social Science History 34:113-128.
- Harkin, Michael E. (2010) Uncommon Ground: Holism and the Future of Anthropology. Reviews in Anthropology 39:25-45.
- Harkin, Michael E. (2011) John White and the Invention of Anthropology: Landscape, Ethnography, and Situating the Other in Roanoke. Histories of Anthropology 7:216-45.
- Harkin, Michael E. (2012) Anthropology at the End of the World. Reviews in Anthropology 41(2):96-108.
- Harkin, Michael E. What Would Franz Boas have thought about 9/11? On the Limits of Negative Capability. In Indigenous Visions, edited by Ned Blackhawk and Isaiah Wilner. Yale University Press, (forthcoming 2013).
- Harkin, Michael E. From King Philip's War to the Mayan Apocalypse: Native American and Western Visions of End Times. In Apocalypse: Imagining the End, edited by Mathias Fuchs and Allanah Hernandez, Oxford: Inter-Disciplinary.Net (forthcoming 2013).
