= Irving Goldman =

American anthropologist

Irving Goldman (September 2, 1911 – April 7, 2002) was an American anthropologist, whose work focused on the analysis of the worldviews and systems of thought of the indigenous peoples he studied.

== Life ==
Goldman was born in Brooklyn to Louis Goldman, an immigrant Russian carpenter, and his wife Golda, who died before he was six years old. Three elder brothers had died from a plague epidemic in Russia before his parents took the step to emigrate to the United States. He intended to make a career in medicine, and graduated from Brooklyn College as a pre-med student in 1933, but quickly changed directions and went, as an "eager but utterly unoriented student" to study under Franz Boas at Columbia University. Under Boas's supervision, he completed his PhD, with a thesis on the Alkatcho Carrier Indians of British Columbia, having done research among the Modoc Indians in California in the meantime (1934). His first major publication consisted of four chapters of a book edited by Margaret Mead, Cooperation and Competition Among Primitive Peoples, (1937). When Boaz received a substantial grant from the Social Science Research Council, Goldman was one beneficiary, alongside colleagues Buell Quain, Jules Henry, William Lipkind, Bernard Mishkin, Ruth Landes, Morris Siegal, and Charles Wagley. Goldman was assigned to study Chibchan-descended Páez of the Central Andes of Colombia. However, he defied his department and on his own initiative decided to venture into the Vaupés for his fieldwork. From September 1939 to June 1940, Goldman conducted fieldwork in the southern region of Vaupés, studying the Cubeo people of the Cuduiarí, which at the time was an "anthropological terra incognita." The result was a monograph, The Cubeo: Indians of the Northwest Amazon, still regarded by specialists as "the very best book on the Vaupés region." His work on the Cubeo, the name being a Europeanization of the Tukano jesting term Kebewá (meaning "the people who are not") is still considered a classic in its field. Gerardo Reichel-Dolmatoff called his structural analysis of Cuneo society "among the best that have been written on the social organization of Amazonian Indians in general. His acute observations combined with meticulous scholarship make this a book of lasting value."

The expertise he gained from his field work in South America led to Goldman's recruitment as an analyst of the region. He worked in Nelson Rockefeller's Bureau of Latin American Research. When World War II broke out, he was drafted and assigned to intelligence work, with Latin America as his area of analysis. Specifically, he worked as a research analyst for the Office of the Coordinator of Inter-American Affairs from 1942 to 1943. He was reassigned, with the rank of 2nd Lieutenant, to the Office of Strategic Services until war's end. He was then transferred to the State Department, as Chief of Branch for the Office of Research Analysis, until he was released in July 1947 as a security risk. Ruth Benedict managed to secure him an appointment to Sarah Lawrence College, in Yonkers, New York. He was subsequently interviewed, in 1953, by the McCarthyist Jenner Committee. part of the Senate Judiciary Committee but, while answering all questions regarding himself, he refused to divulge the names of other members of the Communist Party of the United States, citing his rights under the First Amendment. This was a risky tactic at the time, in the face of threats that he would be cited for contempt. He had joined the American Communist Party in 1936, but left it in 1942. His individual moral position was supported by Sarah Lawrence College and he was able to continue teaching there until his retirement in 1980.

In the postwar period, he conducted fieldwork among the Tzotzil of Chamula Indians in Chiapas, Mexico. He returned for two stints of field research among the Cuneo in 1968-1970 and 1979 From 1980, he taught at the New School for Social Research until his full retirement in 1987.

After his significant work on the Cubeo Goldman he went on to publish monumental, if controversial, studies on two other classic areas of anthropological interest, on Polynesian societies, and on the Kwakiutl of North America. For him, the development of the discipline of anthropology best progressed, in his view, by a dialectical "interplay between field and armchair," which he proceeded to undertake by advancing general interpretations.

He died in 2002 at the age of 90.

=== Polynesian Society ===
Goldman turned his attention to what he saw as the twin features of early societies, religious worldviews and aristocracy. Both of these latter two societies he regarded as examples of a primitive :aristocracy." In his view, "civilizations are the product of developing aristocracy," and their impact operates predominantly through the medium of status-rivalry, status being analysed in 18 Polynesian societies in terms of mana, Tohunga (expertise) and Toa (military prowess). Though the evolutionary reconstruction was dubious, the analysis of status and power gained acclamation. The thesis behind his work on Polynesia is contained in its keynote frontispiece quotation from Balzac:

"The noble of every age has done his best to invent a life which he, and he only, can live."

At stake were three issues. One was historical: (1) the nature of Polynesian societies before contact with the West irremediably altered them (2) How did existing socio-political systems function?, and (3) what were the underlying dynamics that accounted for the differentiation of social forms? In Alan Howard's view, given the virtual absence of reliable and detailed accounts of traditional Polynesian social systems, any attempt to reconstruct the ancient society was doomed to remain speculative, and yield only a theoretical sandcastle. He compared Goldman's work to that of his comprehensive predecessors, Robert W. Williamson and the latter's editor Ralph Piddington, whose wariness about the possibility of working out a system of kinship structures from the large confusion of primary sources from dubious hands stood in marked contrast to Goldman's ambitious overview. Marshall Sahlins, in a critique of an earlier version of Goldman's theory, had implied that "status rivalry," if not the operation of a type of political system, looks in Goldman's approach to be some "disembodied value" or "attribute of the Polynesian psyche."

He proposed three evolutionary historic phases: Traditional (seniority of descent determines the way authority and power are allocated, is religious and headed by a sacred chieftain); Open (where the traditional system undergoes modification to allow secular military and political power to operate, sharpening status differences), and Stratified (where a clear-cut break in status emerges, which is both economic and political) in Polynesian cultural development, with each phase having its own characteristic forms of kinship, authority, rites, and beliefs.

The status lineage in Polynesia differed from the conventional form in its lack of exogamy. Goldman states, "descent is not really a means to status, it is the heart of status" (Goldman's emphasis) and so, writes Alan Howard, descent is rooted in the overriding principle of honour, and thus a certain "logistical freedom" exists for commoners to manoeuver. Howard writes, "structure thus arises from human motives." In the words of Howard, Goldman sees "cultural forms in Polynesia as primarily resultant from the cumulative decisions of chiefs engaged strategically and tactically in a continual game of honour and power."

The book received mixed reviews. F.T. Legg found it to be "a work of very high merit and considerable scholarship." Alan Howard was generally dismissive of this, the ambitious work as symptomatic of a long Western armchair theorist obsession with the idea that l'homme naturel could somehow be discovered in the Pacific, though he wrote that the book's strength, brilliance and acuity lay in Goldman's analysis of the political dynamics of traditional Polynesian societies. As with other specialists, the main charge laid against his interpretation was that his schematic reconstructions smacked of (citing a 1957 paper by Hawthorne and Belshaw) "thinly veiled monism" where a constant, namely status rivalry, is made to account for variability.

=== Kwakiutl ===
He then completed his major study, long in the making, and based on many manuscripts, some 17 volumes, which Boas and his native informants such as George Hunt had never published, on the Kwakiutl with his book, The Mouth of Heaven. Goldman set himself the task of reconstructing from the mass of these relatively unexplored materials the religious thought of the Kwakiutl. This was one of the legs of his growing interest in the formation of early aristocratic societies, which he believed to be intimately tied to religious systems. Extending his ideas, he thought that tribal elites, especially hereditary ones, reflect a religious idea. He sets forth his view of the priority of religion in his opening remark that:

If a culture can be said to exist as a coherent system of thought, the source of coherence is in its religion...religion as an integrative system of thought identifies all fundamental concepts. The religious structures arises out of [observations of nature], out of comprehension of natural principles. Ultimately, then, it is perceived natural principles that integrate a society and govern its structure.'

The thesis that emerged, according to which all aspects of Kwakiutl culture, and especially the key ceremony of the much-studied potlatch, hitherto studied as a classic example of materialist interests underlying ritual organizations, were coterminous with religion, and religion in term was grounded in the way nature is perceived, proved controversial among area specialists. As an anti-functionalist, he was opposed to cultural materialism. Bill Holm was sceptical, observing that Goldman lacked adequate familiarity with the Kwakiutl language in which these primary texts were written. This same charge from area specialists had been made earlier against his work on Polynesia. This lack of intimate linguistic knowledge caused him to make many errors in his review of Kwakiutl texts, and Holm found Goldman's conclusions both unconvincing and disturbing. Philip Drucker ended his review by challenging Goldman's insistence that all aspects of the Kwakiutl lifeway were expressive of religious belief, and judged this approach preconceived, extremist and not believable. For him, Goldman's argument was both monotonous and biased.

To those who criticized his reductionism, which inverted the materialist or sociological reductionism of his times and discipline, he replied:-

'anthropologists belittle their own subject matter and the human beings who have produced it by arguing eternally like Durkheimeans that natural taxa derive from social categories. The savage is smitten with himself-an original narcissist-and sees only himself in nature. We will not have a grown-up anthropology until we grant to the "noble savage" parallel powers of reasoning, and qualities of curiosity and of close observation. I say that we should leave the fascinating questions of chickens and their eggs to coffee-klatsch metaphysicians!'

== Works ==
- 'The Ifugao of the Philippine Islands,'in M. Mead (1937) ch.5, pp. 153ff.
- 'The Kwakiutl Indians of Vancouver Island,' in M. Mead (1937) ch.6, pp180ff.
- 'The Zuni Indians of New Mexico', in M. Mead (1937) ch.10, pp313ff.
- 'The Bathonga of South Africa,' in M. Mead (1937) ch.11, pp. 354ff.
- 'The Alkatcho Carrier of British Columbia,' in Ralph Linton (ed.) Acculturation in Seven American Indian Tribes, D. Appleton-Century, New York, 1940 pp. 333–385.
- 'The Alkatcho Carrier: Historical Background of Crest Prerogatives,' in American Anthropologist, July–September, 1941, Vol. 43 (3), pp. 396–418.
- 'Status Rivalry and Cultural Evolution in Polynesia,' in American Anthropologist 1955 (Vol. 57) pp. 680–697.
- The Cubeo: Indians of the Northwest Amazon, University of Illinois Press, 1963
- Ancient Polynesian Society, University of Chicago Press, 1970
- The Mouth of Heaven, John Wiley and Sons, 1975,
- Cubeo Hehénewa religious thought: metaphysics of a northwestern Amazonian people, (ed. Peter J. Wilson) Columbia University Press, 2004
