= Ruth Bunzel =

American anthropologist

- Born: April 18, 1898; New York City, New York, U.S.
- Died: January 14, 1990 (aged 91); New York City, New York, U.S.
- Education: Barnard College; Columbia University
- Known for: Anthropological study of Native American culture
- Scientific career
- Fields: Anthropologist; Ethnographer
- Workplaces: Barnard College; Columbia University
- Thesis: The Pueblo Potter: A Study of Creative Imagination in Primitive Art (1929)
- Academic advisors: Franz Boas; Ruth Benedict

Ruth Leah Bunzel (née Bernheim) (18 April 1898 – 14 January 1990) was an American anthropologist, known for studying creativity and art among the Zuni people (A:Shiwi), researching the Mayas in Guatemala, and conducting a comparative study of alcoholism in Guatemala and Mexico. Bunzel was the first American anthropologist to conduct substantial research in Guatemala. Her doctoral dissertation, The Pueblo Potter (1929) was a study of the creative process of art in anthropology and Bunzel was one of the first anthropologists to study the creative process.

== Early life ==
Ruth Leah Bunzel was born in New York City on April 18, 1898, to Jewish parents Jonas and Hattie Bernheim. Bunzel lived on the Upper East Side of Manhattan with her parents and lived most of her life in Greenwich Village, only leaving New York for long periods of time when conducting fieldwork. Bunzel's father died when she was ten, and she was raised by her mother. Bunzel was the youngest of four children.

== Education ==
Bunzel's mother encouraged her to study German at Barnard College because of her German and Czech heritage, but World War I inspired Bunzel to change her major to European history. Bunzel received a Bachelor of Art in European History in 1918 from Barnard College. In 1922, she started her career as the secretary and editorial assistant to Franz Boas, founder of the anthropology department at Columbia University, after having taken one of his courses in college. Boas encouraged her to take up anthropology directly. Bunzel replaced Esther Goldfrank, a friend of one of her sisters, who resigned the position to study anthropology at Columbia.

By 1924, Bunzel was considering a career in anthropology, but first wanted to observe anthropological fieldwork. Bunzel planned to spend the summer of 1924 in western New Mexico and east-central Arizona, particularly in Zuni Pueblo, New Mexico. She planned to serve as secretary to Columbia University anthropologist Ruth Benedict, aiding in transcription and typing while Benedict was collecting Zuni mythology.

Boas encouraged Bunzel to pursue her own research while in Zuni Pueblo that summer and suggested that Bunzel study art and Zuni potters, instead of working on secretarial work. Anthropologist Elsie Clews Parsons objected to the idea of Bunzel conducted research among the Zuni people since Bunzel lacked formal anthropological training, and Parsons threatened to remove her financial support of Benedict's research. Boas stepped in, and Parsons allowed the research visit as a personal favor to Boas.

== Fieldwork among the Pueblo of Zuni ==
In the early twentieth century, anthropologists used a method of study called participant observation, which Bunzel utilized when conducting fieldwork among the Zuni people. In the summer of 1924, Bunzel conducted fieldwork among the Zuni people; she apprenticed herself to Zuni potters and observed as well as made potteryalongside them. Focusing her research on pottery offered Bunzel an opportunity to learn from Zuni women's work since women did not participate in Zuni ritual practices. Bunzel was fascinated by the prominent role of women as potters in Zuni society.

Bunzel also studied the Hopi, San Ildefonso, Acoma, and San Felipe Pueblo Indians of the southwestern United States as well. Bunzel utilized this fieldwork for her dissertation, The Pueblo Potter: A Study of Creative Imagination in Primitive Art, which was published in 1929. Her 1929 dissertation describes the creative process of Zuni potters, who preserve and reproduce traditional patterns even as individual potters innovate and create new ones. Bunzel later said, "Look, I was never studying pottery. I was studying human behavior. I wanted to know how the potters felt about what they were doing."

In 1925, after returning to New York, Bunzel resigned as Boaz's secretary, and just like Goldfrank, enrolled as a student at Columbia University to study anthropology. Bunzel was part of the second cohort trained by Boas at Columbia University. She completed her doctoral dissertation in 1927, but she was not fully awarded her PhD until 1929 when her book, The Pueblo Potter, was published. Bunzel's book was the first anthropological study of individual creativity in art within overarching artistic boundaries.

Parsons, who had initially objected to Bunzel travelling to study the Zuni, sponsored her second trip to study ceremonialism among the Zuni people, as well as future trips and projects. The products of this research on Zuni ceremonialism, creation myths, kachinas, and poetry were published in 1932. Bunzel focused on the aesthetic freedom of the individual. Her research produced many publications on Pueblo art, ritual, and folklore, including Notes on the Kachina Cult in San Felipe (1928), The Emergence (1928), Zuni Texts (1933), and Zuni (1935).

Bunzel published her research widely and contributed to publications by other prominent anthropologists. She also produced literature related to Zuni language and culture, providing material for Benedict's Zuni information in Patterns of Culture. Bunzel became known as an authority on the Zuni people. She learned the Zuni language and actively incorporated her informants' views into her writing on the Kachina cult, something that she also did in her later monograph Chichicastenango: A Guatemalan Village. Bunzel edited The Golden Age of American Anthropology (1960) with Margaret Mead and contributed to Boas and Benedict's General Anthropology (1938).

During her fieldwork among the Zuni people, Bunzel lived with Flora Zuni and her family, who initiated her into the Beaver clan and gave her the Zuni name Maiatitsa or "blue bird". Bunzel was also given another Zuni name, Tsatitsa, by the former governor of the pueblo and one of her key informants, Nick Tumaka. Bunzel returned to the Zuni people in 1939 to study Zuni child development. This was her last trip to Zuni Pueblo, New Mexico.

Margaret Mead also acknowledged Ruth Bunzel's contribution in her book Cooperation and Competition Among Primitive Peoples in the prelude, noting how Bunzel allowed Mead to make use of her manuscript related to Zuni economics and offered criticisms and suggestions throughout the writing.

== Fieldwork in Guatemala and Mexico ==
Bunzel interviewed for a Guggenheim Fellowship to study Mexican culture but was redirected to study Guatemala, as little American anthropological research existed in this area at the time. Bunzel studied the Santa Tomas Chichicastenango, a Highland Mayan Village, from 1930 to 1932, resulting in the completion in 1936 and publication in 1952 of her monograph Chichicastenango: A Guatemalan Village.

True to her prior plans, Bunzel also conducted fieldwork in Chamula in Chiapas, Mexico from 1936 to 1937 as part of a comparative study on The Role of Alcoholism in Two Central American Communities, in Chichicastenango and Chamula. Influenced by psychoanalyst Karen Horney, Bunzel focused on the psychological factors contributing to different drinking patterns in Chamula and Chichicastenango. This was the first anthropological study on alcoholism and drinking patterns among different cultures. Bunzel stated that she was not studying alcohol; rather, she studied "people and their drinking habits as seen in their cultural contexts and the influences behind these habits."

Bunzel advanced her field by challenging its methodology. She argued that her primary consultants' insights were incomplete and could not therefore provide generalized information about the culture, rather viewing his or her contributions as partial and individual to that person or smaller groups of people. Bunzel viewed knowledge production as culturally situated, limiting her ethnographic interpretations to a specific group of Maya-K'iche' people in the Guatemalan highlands. Bunzel also advanced the field by studying Chichicastenango, an urban center and hub in the Central American trade system, as opposed to rural settings in Guatemala. Bunzel did not follow anthropological conventions of the time to study "pure," isolated cultures but instead chose to study centers of change, contact, and trade.

Bunzel also juxtaposed her own interpretations of Guatemalan ritual events with those offered by her informants in her monograph Chichicastenango. This monograph was greatly influenced by Boas' historical particularism and Benedict's culture and personality research focused on child development. As at the Zuni Pueblo, where Bunzel relied greatly on one female informant named Flora Zuni and her family, in Chichicastenango Bunzel attached herself to one informant to obtain a focused perspective on a small group of people rather than generalizing her results to an entire culture.

== Professional career ==
During her early career, Bunzel worked as a lecturer at Barnard College from 1929 to 1930, then at Columbia University from 1933 to 1935 and 1937 to 1940. Like many other female anthropologists at Columbia University, including Isabel Kelly, Ruth Landes, and Eleanor Leacock, Bunzel never held a full-time university appointment or tenure.

During her professional career, Bunzel faced social gender politics that prevented her from obtaining a tenure position and threatened her fieldwork. Some of her male colleagues spread inflammatory rumors about unprofessional activity in Chichicastenango that negatively affected Bunzel's professional support among colleagues and prevented her from obtaining a full-time university position.

During World War II, Bunzel worked in England translating broadcasts from English to Spanish and translating incoming Spanish broadcasts for the U.S. Government Office of War Information from 1942 to 1945. Bunzel also contributed to propaganda analysis efforts. After World War II, she became involved in the RCC, the Columbia University Research in Contemporary Cultures Project. This project was funded by the office of Naval Research to study different cultures. Bunzel led a research group studying China which interviewed Chinese immigrants in New York City between 1947 and 1951. In 1951 and 1952, Bunzel developed interview techniques at the Bureau of Applied Social Research project until her appointment as an adjunct professor of anthropology at Columbia University in 1953.

== Later life ==
From 1969 to 1987, Bunzel served as a senior research associate at Columbia University. According to her official appointment card, Bunzel retired in 1966 from her position at Columbia University but even after her official retirement, she continued to teach until 1972. From 1972 to 1974, Bunzel worked as a visiting professor at Bennington College. On January 14, 1990, Bunzel had a heart attack and died at the age of 91 in St. Vincent's-Roosevelt Hospital Center.

The Ruth Leah Bunzel Papers are currently housed at the National Anthropological Archives, including correspondence, manuscripts, notes, research files, teaching materials, artwork, sound recordings, and more.

== Selected bibliography ==
- 1928 "Notes on the Katcina Cult in San Felipe." Journal of American Folklore 41: 290–292
- 1928 "Further Notes on San Felipe." Journal of American Folklore 41: 592.
- 1928 "The emergence." Journal of American Folklore 41: 288–290.
- 1929 The Pueblo Potter: A Study of Creative Imagination in Primitive Art. Courier Dover Publications.
- 1932 Zuni Origin Myths. Chicago: US Government Printing Office.
- 1932 Zuni Ritual Poetry. Chicago: US Government Printing Office.
- 1932 "Introduction to Zuni Ceremonialism." Bureau of American Ethnology BAE Annual Report 47: 467–554

The above three texts collected and reprinted as Zuni Ceremonialism: Three Studies, ed. by Nancy J. Parezo (1992)

- 1932 "The Nature of Kachinas." BAE Annual Report 47: 837–1006. Reprinted in Reader in Comparative Religion, edited by A.W. Lessa and Evon Vogt (1958): 401–404
- 1933 "Zuni." In Handbook of American Indian Languages. Part 3, edited by Franz Boas.
- 1938 "The Economic Organization of Primitive Peoples." In General Anthropology, edited by Franz Boas: 327–408
- 1940 "The role of alcoholism in two Central American cultures". Psychiatry: Journal for the Study of Interpersonal Processes 3(3): 361–387.
- 1952 Chichicastenango, a Guatemalan Village. University of Washington Press.
- 1953 "Psychology of the Pueblo Potter." In Primitive Heritage, edited by Margaret Mead and Nicolas Calas: 266–275
- 1964 "The Self-effacing Zuni of New Mexico." In The Americas on the Eve of Discovery, edited by Harold Driver: 80–92
- 1960 Mead, M., and Bunzel, R. L., eds. The Golden Age of American Anthropology. George Braziller.
- 1976 Bunzel, R. (1976). "Chamula and Chichicastenango: A Re-examination", in Cross-Cultural Approaches to the Study of Alcohol, The Hague: Mouton & Co.: 21–22.
