= Jules Henry =

American anthropologist

- Portrait of Jules Henry
- Born: November 29, 1904
- Died: October 23, 1969 (aged 64)
- Education: Columbia University (Ph.D.)
- Occupation: Anthropologist

Jules Henry (November 29, 1904 – September 23, 1969) was an American anthropologist.

After studies at the City College of New York, Henry earned his Ph.D. in anthropology from Columbia University in 1935. His classmates included Irving Goldman, Ruth Landes and Edward Kennard. His instructors at Columbia included Franz Boas and Margaret Mead.

Henry lived with and mastered the language of the Kaingang natives of the highlands of southern Brazil. In writing about the experience, Henry married the then newly popular psychoanalytic notions of Sigmund Freud with the non-invasive, observational discipline of professional anthropology. The resulting monograph, Jungle People, was, as Henry himself put it, "the first anthropological monograph written from a psychoanalytic point of view."

In 1936, Henry began an 18-month observational residence with the Pilaga natives of Argentina, which, as with his experience in Brazil, figures in his two books, both of which figured in the orthopsychiatry movement becoming popular at that time (orthopsychiatry is the psychiatric study, treatment, and prevention of emotional and behavioral problems, especially of those that arise during early development).

According to Harold Gould, writing in the American Anthropologist in 1969, his experiences with people largely unexposed to Western, industrial culture led Henry "beyond the primitive band into the broader and more universal questions of how human behavior (indeed, the human condition) is transmitted from generation to generation and with what consequences."

Afterwards, he was employed by the U.S. Department of Agriculture and Labor and held various teaching positions at the University of Chicago and in Mexico City. From 1947 to his death in 1969, Henry worked as professor of sociology at Washington University in St. Louis.

His most significant publications before his two major books (cited below) include "Environment and Symptom Formation" (1946), "Cultural Discontinuity and the Shadow of the Past" (1948), "The Principle of Limits with Special Reference to the Social Sciences" (1950), "Family Structure and Psychic Development" (1951), "Family Structure and the Transmission of Neurotic Behavior" (1951), "Child Rearing, Culture and the Natural World" (1952), "Culture, Education and Communications Theory" (1954), "American Culture and Mental Health" (1956), "Attitude Organization in Elementary School Classrooms" (1957), "The Problem of Spontaneity, Initiative and Creativity in Suburban Classrooms" (1959), "The Naturalistic Observations of Families of Psychotic Children" (1961), "Notes on the Alchemy of Mass Misrepresentation" (1961), "Values, Guilt, Suffering and Consequences" (1963), "American Schoolrooms: Learning the Nightmare" (1963), "On Regimentation" (1964), "My Life with the Families of Psychotic Children" (1964), "Sham" (1966), "Public Education and Public Anxiety" (1967), and "Attitude Organization in Elementary School Classrooms" (1969).

The article, "Capital's Last Frontier," published in The Nation magazine in 1966 induced a flurry of letters to the editor. His similarly toned speech at the Canadian Centennial celebration in 1967, "The United States: From Barbarism to Decadence Without Civilization?" also caused a stir in academic circles.

Henry's first book, Culture Against Man (1963) questioned the authority of, and rationale behind, cultural institutions, particularly public education. The collection of essays and anthropological study first drafted in the mid-1950s also examined the influence of American advertising in the Mad Men era and the "human obsolescence" and profitable "warehousing" of the elderly in institutional settings.

His second book, Pathways to Madness (1965), focused on interpersonally-induced mental and developmental disorders, raising the question of how disease and disorder arise from behavioral conditioning in families of origin and cultural institutions. Others developing similar ideas included Gregory Bateson (double binding), Paul Watzlawick (paradoxical injunction), Don D. Jackson (the etiology of schizophrenia) and Ronald D. Laing (crazy-making families).

His third (posthumous) book, On Sham, Vulnerability and other forms of Self-Destruction (1973) is a collection of essays, among them his famed eight-page essay on "Sham," originally prepared for the 1966 Conference on Society and Psychosis at the Hahnemann Medical College (now Drexel University Medical School) in Philadelphia. In it, Henry describes how children are socialized to accept and utilize dishonesty as an interpersonal tool despite being taught to "always tell the truth."

== Adaptations ==
The story of one of the families in Henry's book Pathways to Madness was turned into a theater piece--Pathways to Madness: The Metz Family—scripted by Marc Diamond. Conceived and directed by Tim McDonough and Vincent Murphy, the piece also starred the pair. The show ran from November 10 to December 18, 1982, at Boston's TheaterWorks.
