= Gustav Karsten =

German physicist (1820–1900)

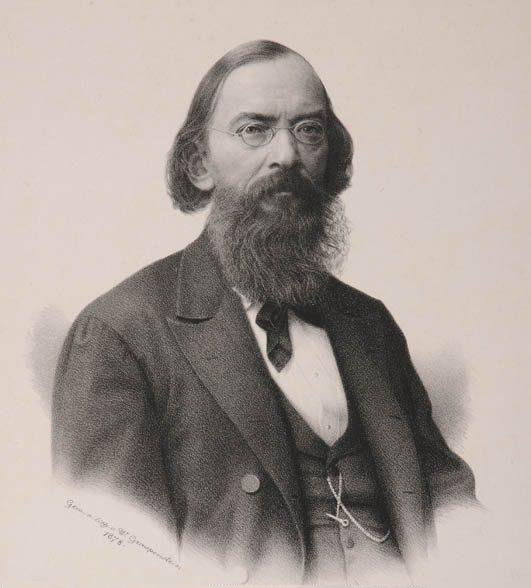
Gustav Karsten

Gustav Karsten (24 November 1820 – 16 March 1900) was a German physicist.

Karsten was born in Berlin. He studied mathematics and sciences at the universities of Bonn and Berlin, receiving his doctorate in 1843 with the thesis Imponderabilium praesertim electricitatis theoria dynamica. At Berlin his teachers were Jakob Steiner, Peter Gustav Lejeune Dirichlet and Heinrich Wilhelm Dove. In 1845 he obtained his habilitation, and from 1847 to 1894 he was a professor of physics and mineralogy at the University of Kiel. At the university he held lectures on experimental and theoretical physics, mineralogy, physical geography and meteorology. He was the doctoral advisor of the influential German-American anthropologist Franz Boas. On four separate occasions he served as university rector (1859–61, 1863–65, 1867/68 and 1890/91). He died in Kiel, aged 79.

In 1845 he was a founding member of the Deutsche Physikalische Gesellschaft. In 1859 he was named director of the administration for the Elbherzogtümer, and from 1870 was a member of the Kommission zur Untersuchung deutscher Meere (Commission for the Scientific Research of the German Seas). For a period of time he was editor of the Fortschritte der Physik.

== Selected works ==
- Lehrgang der mechanischen Naturlehre für höhere Unterrichtsanstalten (3 volumes, 1851–53) – On the mechanical doctrine of nature for higher learning institutes.
- Einleitung in die physik (with Friedrich Harms and Georg Daniel Eduard Weyer, 1856) – Introduction to physics.
- Denkschrift über den grossen Norddeutschen Kanal zwischen Brunsbüttler Koog an der Elbe und dem Kieler Hafen, 1865 – Memorandum on the Great North German Canal between Brunsbüttel polder at the Elbe and Kiel Harbor.

He was the author of several scientific papers in the Annalen der Physik und Chemie, and of 17 biographies in the Allgemeine Deutsche Biographie.
