= Flora Zuni =

Zuni linguist

Flora Zuni (1897–1983) was a member of the Zuni tribe and a native speaker of the Zuni language. Zuni learned to speak English at boarding school in Black Rock, Arizona, United States.

As one of the few bilingual Zuni speakers at the time, Flora Zuni later worked as an interpreter and linguist for outsiders of the tribe. In 1918, Flora Zuni began working as a teacher at the Zuni Day School. Flora Zuni is known for her work with anthropologist Ruth Bunzel and their efforts to preserve the Zuni language, texts and stories. In addition to her linguistic work, Zuni was an entrepreneur and saleswoman.
