= Culture Against Man =

1963 work by Jules Henry

- Author: Jules Henry
- Published: 1963 (Random House)
- Pages: 495

Culture Against Man is a 1963 book-length ethnography by anthropologist Jules Henry of his native United States culture. The book is presented in three parts: American life and its institutions, discussion on child-rearing, and discussion on nursing homes.
