= Franz Boas =

German-born American anthropologist (1858–1942)

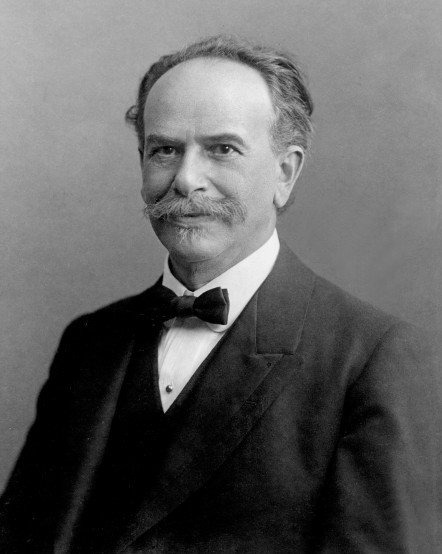
- Boas c. 1915
- Born: Franz Uri Boas; July 9, 1858; Minden, Prussia (now in North Rhine-Westphalia, Germany)
- Died: December 21, 1942 (aged 84); New York City, U.S.
- Spouse: Marie Krackowizer Boas (m. 1887)
- Children: Helene; Ernst; Hedwig; Gertrud; Henry; Franziska
- Parents: Meier Boas; Sophie Meyer Boas

Academic background
- Education: University of Heidelberg; University of Bonn; University of Kiel
- Thesis: Beiträge zur Erkenntniss der Farbe des Wassers (1881)
- Doctoral advisor: Gustav Karsten
- Influences: Adolf Bastian; Moritz Lazarus; Heymann Steinthal; Rudolf Virchow; Theodor Waitz; Wilhelm Wundt

Academic work
- Discipline: Anthropology
- School or tradition: Boasian anthropology
- Institutions: Clark University; Columbia University
- Doctoral students: Ruth Benedict; A. F. Chamberlain; Manuel Gamio; Alexander Goldenweiser; Irving Goldman; Herman Karl Haeberlin; Melville J. Herskovits; George Herzog; E. Adamson Hoebel; Melville Jacobs; William Jones; A. L. Kroeber; Alexander Lesser; Robert Lowie; Margaret Mead; Ashley Montagu; Paul Radin; Gladys Reichard; Edward Sapir; Frank Speck; Leslie Spier; Günter Wagner; Ruth Sawtell Wallis
- Notable students: Fay-Cooper Cole; Erna Gunther; Zora Neale Hurston
- Notable ideas: Cultural relativism; four-field approach
- Influenced: Leonard Bloomfield; Ruth Bunzel; Frederica de Laguna; Gilberto Freyre; Pliny Earle Goddard; Alfred Irving Hallowell; Otto Klineberg; Ruth Landes; Rhoda Métraux; Elsie Clews Parsons; Ruth Underhill; Leah Rachel Yoffie

Franz Uri Boas (Note: Pronounced /ˈboʊæz/ BOH-az; German: [ˈboːas].) (July 9, 1858 – December 21, 1942) was a German-American anthropologist and ethnomusicologist. He was a pioneer of modern anthropology who has been called the "Father of American Anthropology". His work is associated with the movements known as historical particularism and cultural relativism.

Studying in Germany, Boas was awarded a doctorate in 1881 in physics while also studying geography. He then participated in a geographical expedition to northern Canada, where he became fascinated with the culture and language of the Baffin Island Inuit. He went on to do field work with the indigenous cultures and languages of the Pacific Northwest. In 1887 he emigrated to the United States, where he first worked as a museum curator at the Smithsonian, and in 1899 became a professor of anthropology at Columbia University, where he remained for the rest of his career. Through his students, many of whom went on to found anthropology departments and research programmes inspired by their mentor, Boas profoundly influenced the development of American anthropology. Among his many significant students were A. L. Kroeber, Alexander Goldenweiser, Ruth Benedict, Edward Sapir, Margaret Mead, Zora Neale Hurston, and Gilberto Freyre.

Boas was one of the most prominent opponents of the then-popular ideologies of scientific racism, the idea that race is a biological concept and that human behavior is best understood through the typology of biological characteristics. In a series of groundbreaking studies of skeletal anatomy, he showed that cranial shape and size was highly malleable depending on environmental factors such as health and nutrition, in contrast to the claims by racial anthropologists of the day that held head shape to be a stable racial trait. Boas also worked to demonstrate that differences in human behavior are not primarily determined by innate biological dispositions but are largely the result of cultural differences acquired through social learning. In this way, Boas posed culture as the primary concept for describing differences in behavior between human groups, and as the central analytical concept of anthropology.

Among Boas's main contributions to anthropological thought was his rejection of the then-popular evolutionary approaches to the study of culture, which saw all societies progressing through a set of hierarchic technological and cultural stages, with Western European culture at the summit. Boas argued that culture developed historically through the interactions of groups of people and the diffusion of ideas and that consequently there was no process towards continuously "higher" cultural forms. Boas was a proponent of the idea of cultural relativism, which holds that cultures cannot be objectively ranked as higher or lower, or better or more correct, but that all humans see the world through the lens of their own culture, and judge it according to their own culturally acquired norms. By uniting the disciplines of archaeology, the study of material culture and history, and physical anthropology, the study of variation in human anatomy, with ethnology, the study of cultural variation of customs, and descriptive linguistics, the study of unwritten indigenous languages, Boas created the four-field subdivision of anthropology which became prominent in American anthropology in the 20th century.

== Early life and education ==
Franz Boas was born on July 9, 1858, in Minden, Westphalia, the son of Sophie Meyer and Meier Boas. Although his grandparents were observant Jews, his parents embraced Enlightenment values, including their assimilation into modern German society. Boas's parents were liberal; they did not like dogma of any kind. An important early influence was the avuncular Abraham Jacobi, his mother's brother-in-law and a friend of Karl Marx, who was to advise him throughout Boas's career. Early in life, he displayed a penchant for both nature and natural sciences. Boas refused to convert to Christianity, but he did not identify himself as a religious Jew. This is disputed however by Ruth Bunzel, a protégée of Boas, who called him "the essential protestant; he valued autonomy above all things." According to his biographer, "He was a Jewish German, preserving and promoting German culture and values in America." In an autobiographical sketch, Boas wrote:

The background of my early thinking was a German home in which the ideals of the revolution of 1848 were a living force. My father, liberal, but not active in public affairs; my mother, idealistic, with a lively interest in public matters; the founder about 1854 of the kindergarten in my hometown, devoted to science. My parents had broken through the shackles of dogma. My father had retained an emotional affection for the ceremonial of his parental home, without allowing it to influence his intellectual freedom.

From kindergarten on, Boas was educated in natural history, a subject he enjoyed. In gymnasium, he was most proud of his research on the geographic distribution of plants.

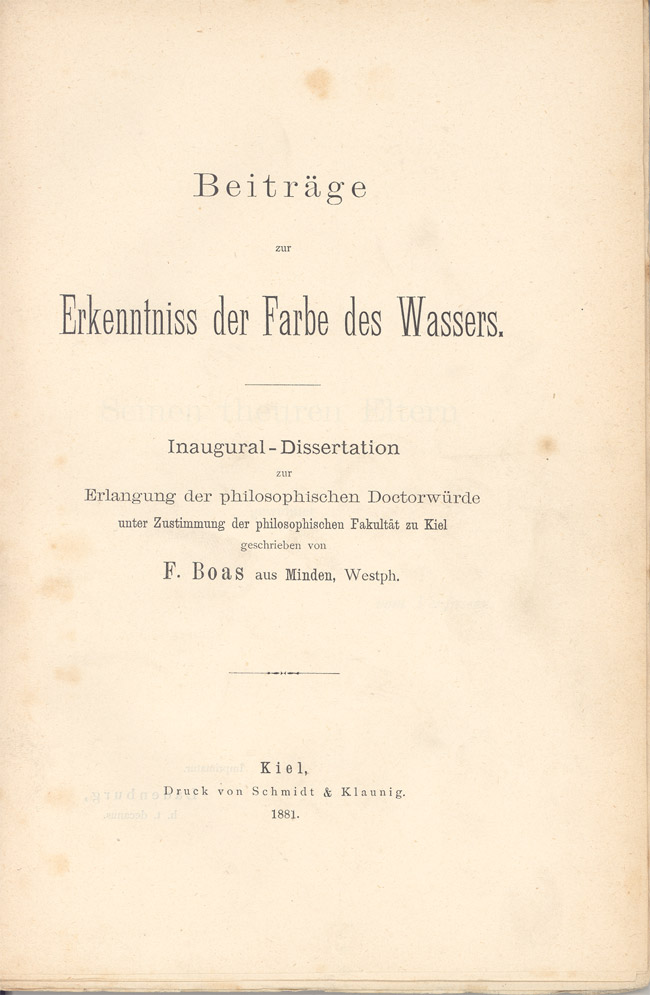
Boas's dissertation: Beiträge zur Erkenntniss der Farbe des Wassers

When he started his university studies, Boas first attended Heidelberg University for a semester followed by four terms at Bonn University, studying physics, geography, and mathematics at these schools. In 1879, he hoped to transfer to Berlin University to study physics under Hermann von Helmholtz, but ended up transferring to the University of Kiel instead due to family reasons. At Kiel, Boas had wanted to focus on the mathematical topic of C.F. Gauss's law of the normal distribution of errors for his dissertation, but he ultimately had to settle for a topic chosen for him by his doctoral advisor, physicist Gustav Karsten, on the optical properties of water. Boas completed his dissertation entitled Contributions to the Perception of the Color of Water, which examined the absorption, reflection, and polarization of light in water, and was awarded a PhD in physics in 1881.

While at Bonn, Boas had attended geography classes taught by the geographer Theobald Fischer and the two established a friendship, with the coursework and friendship continuing after both relocated to Kiel at the same time. Fischer, a student of Carl Ritter, rekindled Boas's interest in geography and ultimately had more influence on him than did Karsten, and thus some biographers view Boas as more of a geographer than a physicist at this stage. In addition to the major in physics, Adams, citing Kroeber, states that "[i]n accordance with German tradition at the time ... he also had to defend six minor theses", and Boas likely completed a minor in geography, which would explain why Fischer was one of Boas's degree examiners. Because of this close relationship between Fischer and Boas, some biographers have gone so far as to incorrectly state that Boas "followed" Fischer to Kiel, and that Boas received a PhD in geography with Fischer as his doctoral advisor. For his part, Boas self-identified as a geographer by the time he completed his doctorate, prompting his sister, Toni, to write in 1883, "After long years of infidelity, my brother was re-conquered by geography, the first love of his boyhood."

In his dissertation research, Boas's methodology included investigating how different intensities of light created different colors when interacting with different types of water; however, he encountered difficulty in being able to objectively perceive slight differences in the color of water, and as a result became intrigued by this problem of perception and its influence on quantitative measurements. Boas, due to tone deafness, would later encounter difficulties also in studying tonal languages such as Laguna. Boas had already been interested in Kantian philosophy since taking a course on aesthetics with Kuno Fischer at Heidelberg. These factors led Boas to consider pursuing research in psychophysics, which explores the relationship between the psychological and the physical, after completing his doctorate, but he had no training in psychology. Boas did publish six articles on psychophysics during his year of military service (1882–1883), but ultimately he decided to focus on geography, primarily so he could receive sponsorship for his planned Baffin Island expedition.

== Post-graduate studies ==
Boas took up geography as a way to explore his growing interest in the relationship between subjective experience and the objective world. At the time, German geographers were divided over the causes of cultural variation. Many argued that the physical environment was the principal determining factor, but others (notably Friedrich Ratzel) argued that the diffusion of ideas through human migration is more important. In 1883, encouraged by Theobald Fischer, Boas went to Baffin Island to conduct geographic research on the impact of the physical environment on native Inuit migrations. The first of many ethnographic field trips, Boas culled his notes to write his first monograph titled The Central Eskimo, which was published in 1888 in the 6th Annual Report from the Bureau of American Ethnology. Boas lived and worked closely with the Inuit on Baffin Island, and he developed an abiding interest in the way people lived.

In the perpetual darkness of the Arctic winter, Boas reported, he and his traveling companion became lost and were forced to keep sledding for twenty-six hours through ice, soft snow, and temperatures that dropped below −46 °C. The following day, Boas penciled in his diary,

I often ask myself what advantages our 'good society' possesses over that of the 'savages' and find, the more I see of their customs, that we have no right to look down upon them ... We have no right to blame them for their forms and superstitions which may seem ridiculous to us. We 'highly educated people' are much worse, relatively speaking ...

Boas went on to explain in the same entry that "all service, therefore, which a man can perform for humanity must serve to promote truth." Before his departure, his father had insisted he be accompanied by one of the family's servants, Wilhelm Weike who cooked for him and kept a journal of the expedition. Boas was nonetheless forced to depend on various Inuit groups for everything from directions and food to shelter and companionship. It was a difficult year filled with tremendous hardships that included frequent bouts of disease, mistrust, pestilence, and danger.

Boas returned to Berlin to complete his studies. His interest in indigenous communities grew as he worked at the Royal Ethnological Museum in Berlin, where he was introduced to members of the Nuxalk Nation of British Columbia, which sparked a lifelong relationship with the First Nations of the Pacific Northwest. Simultaneously, he studied the methodologies of ethnomusicologists Carl Stumpf, Erich von Hornbostel, and George Herzog; practices he would later utilize in his own work in ethnomusicology.

In 1886, Boas defended (with Helmholtz's support) his habilitation thesis, Baffin Land, and was named Privatdozent in geography.

While on Baffin Island he began to develop his interest in studying non-Western cultures (resulting in his book, The Central Eskimo, published in 1888). In 1885, he went to work with physical anthropologist Rudolf Virchow and ethnologist Adolf Bastian at the Royal Ethnological Museum in Berlin. Boas had studied anatomy with Virchow two years earlier while preparing for the Baffin Island expedition. At the time, Virchow was involved in a vociferous debate over evolution with his former student, Ernst Haeckel. Haeckel had abandoned his medical practice to study comparative anatomy after reading Charles Darwin's The Origin of Species, and vigorously promoted Darwin's ideas in Germany. However, like most other natural scientists prior to the rediscovery of Mendelian genetics in 1900 and the development of the modern synthesis, Virchow felt that Darwin's theories were weak because they lacked a theory of cellular mutability. Accordingly, Virchow favored Lamarckian models of evolution. This debate resonated with debates among geographers. Lamarckians believed that environmental forces could precipitate rapid and enduring changes in organisms that had no inherited source; thus, Lamarckians and environmental determinists often found themselves on the same side of debates.

But Boas worked more closely with Bastian, who was noted for his antipathy to environmental determinism. Instead, he argued for the "psychic unity of mankind", a belief that all humans had the same intellectual capacity, and that all cultures were based on the same basic mental principles. Variations in custom and belief, he argued, were the products of historical accidents. This view resonated with Boas's experiences on Baffin Island and drew him towards anthropology.

While at the Royal Ethnological Museum Boas became interested in the Native Americans in the Pacific Northwest, and after defending his habilitation thesis, he left for a three-month trip to British Columbia via New York. In January 1887, he was offered a job as assistant editor of the journal Science. Alienated by growing antisemitism and nationalism as well as the very limited academic opportunities for a geographer in Germany, Boas decided to stay in the United States. Possibly he received additional motivation for this decision from his romance with Marie Krackowizer, whom he married in the same year. With a family underway and under financial stress, Boas also resorted to pilfering bones and skulls from native burial sites to sell to museums.

Aside from his editorial work at Science, in 1888 Boas secured an appointment as docent in anthropology at Clark University in Massachusetts. Boas was concerned about university president G. Stanley Hall's interference in his research, yet in 1889 he was appointed as the head of a newly created department of anthropology at the university. In the early 1890s, Boas went on a series of expeditions which were referred to as the Morris K. Jesup Expedition. The primary goal of these expeditions was to illuminate Asiatic-American relations. In 1892 Boas, along with another member of the Clark faculty, resigned in protest of the alleged infringement on academic freedom by Hall.

== World's Columbian Exposition ==
Anthropologist Frederic Ward Putnam, director and curator of the Peabody Museum at Harvard University, who had been appointed as head of the Department of Ethnology and Archeology for the Chicago Fair in 1892, chose Boas as his first assistant at Chicago to prepare for the 1893 World's Columbian Exposition or Chicago World's Fair, the 400th anniversary of Christopher Columbus's arrival in the Americas. Boas had a chance to apply his approach to exhibits. Boas directed a team of about one hundred assistants, mandated to create anthropology and ethnology exhibits on the Indians of North America and South America that were living at the time Christopher Columbus arrived in America while searching for India. Putnam intended the World's Columbian Exposition to be a celebration of Columbus' voyage. Putnam argued that showing late nineteenth century Inuit and First Nations (then called Eskimo and Indians) "in their natural conditions of life" would provide a contrast and celebrate the four centuries of Western accomplishments since 1493.

Franz Boas traveled north to gather ethnographic material for the Exposition. Boas had intended public science in creating exhibitions for the Exposition where visitors to the Midway could learn about other cultures. Boas arranged for fourteen Kwakwaka'wakw aboriginals from British Columbia to come and reside in a mock Kwakwaka'wakw village, where they could perform their daily tasks in context. Inuit were there with 12-foot-long whips made of sealskin, wearing sealskin clothing and showing how adept they were in sealskin kayaks. His experience with the Exposition provided the first of a series of shocks to Franz Boas's faith in public anthropology. The visitors were not there to be educated. By 1916, Boas had come to recognize with a certain resignation that "the number of people in our country who are willing and able to enter into the modes of thought of other nations is altogether too small ... The American who is cognizant only of his own standpoint sets himself up as arbiter of the world."

Boas collaborated with Benjamin Ives Gilman to record music performed by Kwakwakaʼwakw musicians who were appearing at the Columbian Exposition. He had previously collaborated with Alice Cunningham Fletcher at the Bureau of American Ethnology in making several recordings of Indigenous music of North America. Boas and Fletcher partnered with music educator John Comfort Fillmore (1843–1898) in transcribing the music they recorded into music notation, and Fillmore also worked on the music Boas and Gilman recorded during the Columbian Exposition.

After the exposition, the ethnographic material collected formed the basis of the newly created Field Museum in Chicago with Boas as the curator of anthropology. He worked there until 1894, when he was replaced (against his will) by BAE archeologist William Henry Holmes.

In 1896, Boas was appointed Assistant Curator of Ethnology and Somatology of the American Museum of Natural History under Putnam. In 1897, he organized the Jesup North Pacific Expedition, a five-year-long field-study of the nations of the Pacific Northwest, whose ancestors had migrated across the Bering Strait from Siberia. This was the first comprehensive anthropological survey of the north circumpolar region, and Boas and his students made many sound and film recordings during this trip. These included a wide range of cultural recordings, including music with written song texts and translations. The music recordings produced during this study became a model for later studies in ethnomusicology.

Boas attempted to organize the research gathered from the Jessup Expedition into contextual, rather than evolutionary, lines. He also developed a research program in line with his curatorial goals: describing his instructions to his students in terms of widening contexts of interpretation within a society, he explained that "... they get the specimens; they get explanations of the specimens; they get connected texts that partly refer to the specimens and partly to abstract things concerning the people; and they get grammatical information". These widening contexts of interpretation were abstracted into one context, the context in which the specimens, or assemblages of specimens, would be displayed: "... we want a collection arranged according to tribes, in order to teach the particular style of each group". His approach, however, brought him into conflict with the President of the Museum, Morris Jesup, and its director, Hermon Bumpus. By 1900 Boas had begun to retreat from American museum anthropology as a tool of education or reform (Hinsley 1992: 361). He resigned in 1905, never to work for a museum again.

== Late 19th century debates ==
=== Science versus history ===
Some scholars, like Boas's student Alfred Kroeber, believed that Boas used his research in physics as a model for his work in anthropology. Many others, however—including Boas's student Alexander Lesser, and later researchers such as Marian W. Smith, Herbert S. Lewis, and Matti Bunzl—have pointed out that Boas explicitly rejected physics in favor of history as a model for his anthropological research.

This distinction between science and history has its origins in 19th-century German academe, which distinguished between Naturwissenschaften (the sciences) and Geisteswissenschaften (the humanities), or between Gesetzwissenschaften (the law - giving sciences) and Geschichtswissenschaften (history). Generally, Naturwissenschaften and Gesetzwissenschaften refer to the study of phenomena that are governed by objective natural laws, while the latter terms in the two oppositions refer to those phenomena that have to mean only in terms of human perception or experience.

In 1884, Kantian philosopher Wilhelm Windelband coined the terms nomothetic and idiographic to describe these two divergent approaches. He observed that most scientists employ some mix of both, but in differing proportions; he considered physics a perfect example of a nomothetic science, and history, an idiographic science. Moreover, he argued that each approach has its origin in one of the two "interests" of reason Kant had identified in the Critique of Judgment—one "generalizing", the other "specifying". (Winkelband's student Heinrich Rickert elaborated on this distinction in The Limits of Concept Formation in Natural Science : A Logical Introduction to the Historical Sciences; Boas's students Alfred Kroeber and Edward Sapir relied extensively on this work in defining their own approach to anthropology.)

Although Kant considered these two interests of reason to be objective and universal, the distinction between the natural and human sciences was institutionalized in Germany, through the organization of scholarly research and teaching, following the Enlightenment. In Germany, the Enlightenment was dominated by Kant himself, who sought to establish principles based on universal rationality. In reaction to Kant, German scholars such as Johann Gottfried Herder (an influence to Boas) argued that human creativity, which necessarily takes unpredictable and highly diverse forms, is as important as human rationality. In 1795, the great linguist and philosopher Wilhelm von Humboldt called for an anthropology that would synthesize Kant's and Herder's interests. Humboldt founded the University of Berlin in 1809, and his work in geography, history, and psychology provided the milieu in which Boas's intellectual orientation matured.

Historians working in the Humboldtian tradition developed ideas that would become central in Boasian anthropology. Leopold von Ranke defined the task of the historian as "merely to show as it actually was", which is a cornerstone of Boas's empiricism. Wilhelm Dilthey emphasized the centrality of "understanding" to human knowledge, and that the lived experience of a historian could provide a basis for an empathic understanding of the situation of a historical actor. For Boas, both values were well-expressed in a quote from Goethe: "A single action or event is interesting, not because it is explainable, but because it is true."

The influence of these ideas on Boas is apparent in his 1887 essay, "The Study of Geography", in which he distinguished between physical science, which seeks to discover the laws governing phenomena, and historical science, which seeks a thorough understanding of phenomena on their own terms. Boas argued that geography is and must be historical in this sense. In 1887, after his Baffin Island expedition, Boas wrote "The Principles of Ethnological Classification", in which he developed this argument in application to anthropology:

Ethnological phenomena are the result of the physical and psychical character of men, and of its development under the influence of the surroundings ... 'Surroundings' are the physical conditions of the country, and the sociological phenomena, i.e., the relation of man to man. Furthermore, the study of the present surroundings is insufficient: the history of the people, the influence of the regions through which it has passed on its migrations, and the people with whom it came into contact, must be considered

This formulation echoes Ratzel's focus on historical processes of human migration and culture contact and Bastian's rejection of environmental determinism. It also emphasizes culture as a context ("surroundings"), and the importance of history. These are the hallmarks of Boasian anthropology (which Marvin Harris would later call "historical particularism"), would guide Boas's research over the next decade, as well as his instructions to future students. (See Lewis 2001b for an alternative view to Harris'.)

Although context and history were essential elements to Boas's understanding of anthropology as Geisteswissenschaften and Geschichtswissenschaften, there is one essential element that Boasian anthropology shares with Naturwissenschaften: empiricism. In 1949, Boas's student Alfred Kroeber summed up the three principles of empiricism that define Boasian anthropology as a science:

1. The method of science is, to begin with, questions, not with answers, least of all with value judgments.
2. Science is a dispassionate inquiry and therefore cannot take over outright any ideologies "already formulated in everyday life" since these are themselves inevitably traditional and normally tinged with emotional prejudice.
3. Sweeping all-or-none, black-and-white judgments are characteristic of categorical attitudes and have no place in science, whose very nature is inferential and judicious.

=== Orthogenetic versus Darwinian evolution ===
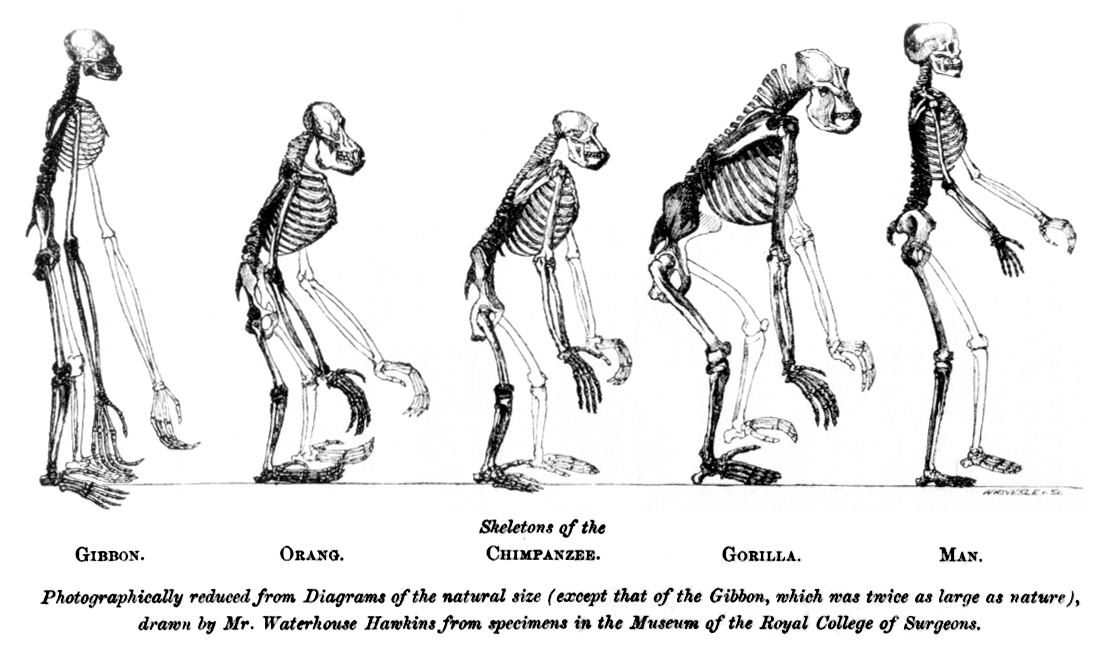
An illustration from Evidence as to Man's Place in Nature (1863) by Thomas Henry Huxley, which became emblematic of the now-discredited idea of evolution as linear progress

One of the greatest accomplishments of Boas and his students was their critique of theories of physical, social, and cultural evolution current at that time. This critique is central to Boas's work in museums, as well as his work in all four fields of anthropology. As historian George Stocking noted, however, Boas's main project was to distinguish between biological and cultural heredity, and to focus on the cultural processes that he believed had the greatest influence over social life. In fact, Boas supported Darwinian theory, although he did not assume that it automatically applied to cultural and historical phenomena (and indeed was a lifelong opponent of 19th-century theories of cultural evolution, such as those of Lewis H. Morgan and Edward Burnett Tylor). The notion of evolution that the Boasians ridiculed and rejected was the then dominant belief in orthogenesis—a determinate or teleological process of evolution in which change occurs progressively regardless of natural selection. Boas rejected the prevalent theories of social evolution developed by Edward Burnett Tylor, Lewis Henry Morgan, and Herbert Spencer not because he rejected the notion of "evolution" per se, but because he rejected orthogenetic notions of evolution in favor of Darwinian evolution.

The difference between these prevailing theories of cultural evolution and Darwinian theory cannot be overstated: the orthogeneticists argued that all societies progress through the same stages in the same sequence. Thus, although the Inuit with whom Boas worked at Baffin Island, and the Germans with whom he studied as a graduate student, were contemporaries of one another, evolutionists argued that the Inuit were at an earlier stage in their evolution, and Germans at a later stage.

Boasians argued that virtually every claim made by cultural evolutionists was contradicted by the data, or reflected a profound misinterpretation of the data. As Boas's student Robert Lowie remarked, "Contrary to some misleading statements on the subject, there have been no responsible opponents of evolution as 'scientifically proved', though there has been determined hostility to an evolutionary metaphysics that falsifies the established facts". In an unpublished lecture, Boas characterized his debt to Darwin thus:

Although the idea does not appear quite definitely expressed in Darwin's discussion of the development of mental powers, it seems quite clear that his main object has been to express his conviction that the mental faculties developed essentially without a purposive end, but they originated as variations, and were continued by natural selection. This idea was also brought out very clearly by Wallace, who emphasized that apparently reasonable activities of man might very well have developed without an actual application of reasoning.

Thus, Boas suggested that what appear to be patterns or structures in a culture were not a product of conscious design, but rather the outcome of diverse mechanisms that produce cultural variation (such as diffusion and independent invention), shaped by the social environment in which people live and act. Boas concluded his lecture by acknowledging the importance of Darwin's work: "I hope I may have succeeded in presenting to you, however imperfectly, the currents of thought due to the work of the immortal Darwin which have helped to make anthropology what it is at the present time."

== Clash with Maurice Fishberg, Joseph Jacobs and Ellsworth Huntington ==
During Maurice Fishberg's time as a medical examiner he recorded skull and nose measurements of Jewish immigrants through which he originally asserted a genetic difference between Jews and non-Jews to describe them as another race along with Joseph Jacobs. However his theories were largely discredited by Franz Boas through the application of the scientific method. Opposed to the narrow or vertically arranged studies which Maurice Fishberg conducted which completely ignored the Jewish ethnicity i.e. culture, religion, and even family in the case of adoptions Franz Boas looked at all of those factors as well as across multiple generations and in multiple geographic locations to determine there to be no discernable genetic difference between Jews and non-Jews. This combined with the growth of what Max J. Kholer called Hitlerism or later Nazism in Germany resulted in a national summit where Franz Boas who had legally and scientifically been determined to be the factually correct opinion on the genetics of the Jewish people presided as guest of honor as Maurice Fishberg along with Ellsworth Huntington discredited their prior works before The Judaens and the Jewish Academy of Sciences on March 4, 1934, to emphatically state that there is no genetic difference between Jew and non-Jew nor any superior race. Later this discussion was distributed by Congregation B'nai B'rith in Cincinnati, Ohio.

== Early career: museum studies ==
In the late 19th century anthropology in the United States was dominated by the Bureau of American Ethnology, directed by John Wesley Powell, a geologist who favored Lewis Henry Morgan's theory of cultural evolution. The BAE was housed at the Smithsonian Institution in Washington, and the Smithsonian's curator for ethnology, Otis T. Mason, shared Powell's commitment to cultural evolution. (The Peabody Museum at Harvard University was an important, though lesser, center of anthropological research.)

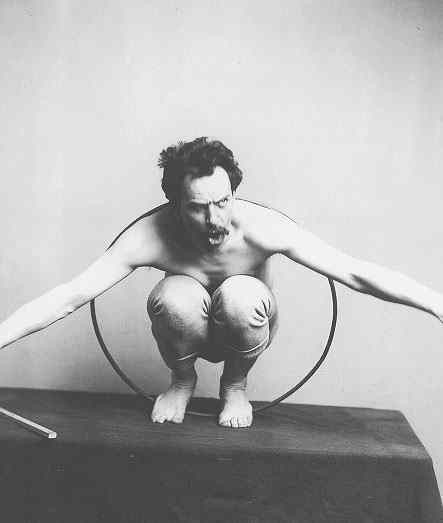
Franz Boas posing for figure in US Natural History Museum exhibit entitled "Hamats'a coming out of secret room" 1895 or before. Courtesy of National Anthropology Archives. (Kwakiutl culture)

It was while working on museum collections and exhibitions that Boas formulated his basic approach to culture, which led him to break with museums and seek to establish anthropology as an academic discipline.

During this period Boas made five more trips to the Pacific Northwest. His continuing field research led him to think of culture as a local context for human action. His emphasis on local context and history led him to oppose the dominant model at the time, cultural evolution.

Boas initially broke with evolutionary theory over the issue of kinship. Lewis Henry Morgan had argued that all human societies move from an initial form of matrilineal organization to patrilineal organization. First Nations groups on the northern coast of British Columbia, like the Tsimshian, and Tlingit, were organized into matrilineal clans. First Nations on the southern coast, like the Nootka and the Salish, however, were organized into patrilineal groups. Boas focused on the Kwakiutl, who lived between the two clusters. The Kwakiutl seemed to have a mix of features. Prior to marriage, a man would assume his wife's father's name and crest. His children took on these names and crests as well, although his sons would lose them when they got married. Names and crests thus stayed in the mother's line. At first, Boas—like Morgan before him—suggested that the Kwakiutl had been matrilineal like their neighbors to the north, but that they were beginning to evolve patrilineal groups. In 1897, however, he repudiated himself, and argued that the Kwakiutl were changing from a prior patrilineal organization to a matrilineal one, as they learned about matrilineal principles from their northern neighbors.

Boas's rejection of Morgan's theories led him, in an 1887 article, to challenge Mason's principles of museum display. At stake, however, were more basic issues of causality and classification. The evolutionary approach to material culture led museum curators to organize objects on display according to function or level of technological development. Curators assumed that changes in the forms of artifacts reflect some natural process of progressive evolution. Boas, however, felt that the form an artifact took reflected the circumstances under which it was produced and used. Arguing that "[t]hough like causes have like effects like effects have not like causes", Boas realized that even artifacts that were similar in form might have developed in very different contexts, for different reasons. Mason's museum displays, organized along evolutionary lines, mistakenly juxtapose like effects; those organized along contextual lines would reveal like causes.

=== Minik Wallace ===
In his capacity as Assistant Curator at the American Museum of Natural History, Franz Boas requested that Arctic explorer Robert E. Peary bring one Inuk from Greenland to New York. Peary obliged and brought six Inuit to New York in 1897 who lived in the basement of the American Museum of Natural History. Four of them died from tuberculosis within a year of arriving in New York, one returned to Greenland, and a young boy, Minik Wallace, remained living in the museum. Boas staged a funeral for the father of the boy and had the remains dissected and placed in the museum. Boas has been widely critiqued for his role in bringing the Inuit to New York and his disinterest in them once they had served their purpose at the museum.

== Later career: academic anthropology ==
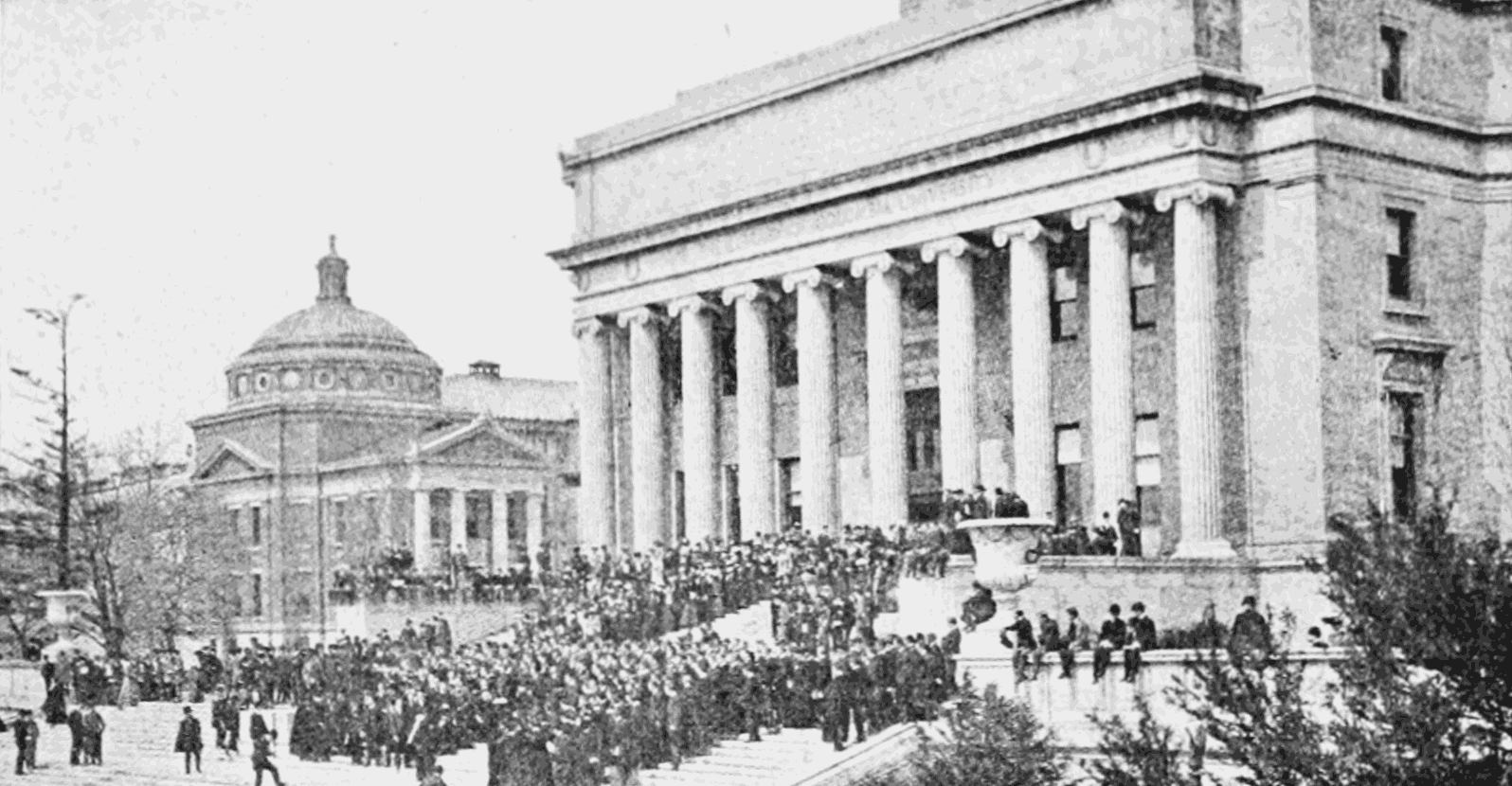
Columbia University library in 1903

Boas was appointed a lecturer in physical anthropology at Columbia University in 1896, and promoted to professor of anthropology in 1899. However, the various anthropologists teaching at Columbia had been assigned to different departments. When Boas left the Museum of Natural History, he negotiated with Columbia University to consolidate the various professors into one department, of which Boas would take charge. Boas's program at Columbia was the first Doctor of Philosophy (PhD) program in anthropology in America. In the years that followed, Columbia (alongside Harvard) was a leading institution in American anthropology as well as the main location where the discipline came to include Jews and women. Over the twenty years from 1921 to 1940, the department awarded nearly as many PhD's to women (19) as men (20), an exceptional level of gender equity not approached elsewhere.

During this time Boas played a key role in organizing the American Anthropological Association (AAA) as an umbrella organization for the emerging field. Boas originally wanted the AAA to be limited to professional anthropologists, but William John McGee (another geologist who had joined the BAE under Powell's leadership) argued that the organization should have an open membership. McGee's position prevailed and he was elected the organization's first president in 1902; Boas was elected a vice-president, along with Putnam, Powell, and Holmes.

At both Columbia and the AAA, Boas encouraged the "four-field" concept of anthropology; he personally contributed to physical anthropology, linguistics, archaeology, as well as cultural anthropology. His work in these fields was pioneering: in physical anthropology he led scholars away from static taxonomical classifications of race, to an emphasis on human biology and evolution; in linguistics he broke through the limitations of classic philology and established some of the central problems in modern linguistics and cognitive anthropology; in cultural anthropology he (along with the Polish-English anthropologist Bronisław Malinowski) established the contextualist approach to culture, cultural relativism, and the participant observation method of fieldwork.

The four-field approach understood not merely as bringing together different kinds of anthropologists into one department, but as reconceiving anthropology through the integration of different objects of anthropological research into one overarching object, was one of Boas's fundamental contributions to the discipline, and came to characterize American anthropology against that of England, France, or Germany. This approach defines as its object the human species as a totality. This focus did not lead Boas to seek to reduce all forms of humanity and human activity to some lowest common denominator; rather, he understood the essence of the human species to be the tremendous variation in human form and activity (an approach that parallels Charles Darwin's approach to species in general).

In his 1907 essay, "Anthropology", Boas identified two basic questions for anthropologists: "Why are the tribes and nations of the world different, and how have the present differences developed?". Amplifying these questions, he explained the object of anthropological study thus:

We do not discuss the anatomical, physiological, and mental characteristics of a man considered as an individual; but we are interested in the diversity of these traits in groups of men found in different geographical areas and in different social classes. It is our task to inquire into the causes that have brought about the observed differentiation and to investigate the sequence of events that have led to the establishment of the multifarious forms of human life. In other words, we are interested in the anatomical and mental characteristics of men living under the same biological, geographical, and social environment, and as determined by their past.

These questions signal a marked break from then-current ideas about human diversity, which assumed that some people have a history, evident in a historical (or written) record, while other people, lacking writing, also lack history. For some, this distinction between two different kinds of societies explained the difference between history, sociology, economics and other disciplines that focus on people with writing, and anthropology, which was supposed to focus on people without writing. Boas rejected this distinction between kinds of societies, and this division of labor in the academy. He understood all societies to have a history, and all societies to be proper objects of the anthropological society. In order to approach literate and non-literate societies the same way, he emphasized the importance of studying human history through the analysis of other things besides written texts. Thus, in his 1904 article, "The History of Anthropology", Boas wrote that

The historical development of the work of anthropologists seems to single out clearly a domain of knowledge that heretofore has not been treated by any other science. It is the biological history of mankind in all its varieties; linguistics applied to people without written languages; the ethnology of people without historical records; and prehistoric archeology.

Historians and social theorists in the 18th and 19th centuries had speculated as to the causes of this differentiation, but Boas dismissed these theories, especially the dominant theories of social evolution and cultural evolution as speculative. He endeavored to establish a discipline that would base its claims on a rigorous empirical study.

One of Boas's most important books, The Mind of Primitive Man (1911), integrated his theories concerning the history and development of cultures and established a program that would dominate American anthropology for the next fifteen years. In this study, he established that in any given population, biology, language, material, and symbolic culture, are autonomous; that each is an equally important dimension of human nature, but that no one of these dimensions is reducible to another. In other words, he established that culture does not depend on any independent variables. He emphasized that the biological, linguistic, and cultural traits of any group of people are the product of historical developments involving both cultural and non-cultural forces. He established that cultural plurality is a fundamental feature of humankind and that the specific cultural environment structures much individual behavior.

Boas also presented himself as a role model for the citizen-scientist, who understand that even were the truth pursued as its own end, all knowledge has moral consequences. The Mind of Primitive Man ends with an appeal to humanism:

I hope the discussions outlined in these pages have shown that the data of anthropology teach us a greater tolerance of forms of civilization different from our own, that we should learn to look on foreign races with greater sympathy and with a conviction that, as all races have contributed in the past to cultural progress in one way or another, so they will be capable of advancing the interests of mankind if we are only willing to give them a fair opportunity.

=== Physical anthropology ===
Boas's work in physical anthropology brought together his interest in Darwinian evolution with his interest in migration as a cause of change. His most important research in this field was his study of changes in the body from among children of immigrants in New York. Other researchers had already noted differences in height, cranial measurements, and other physical features between Americans and people from different parts of Europe. Many used these differences to argue that there is an innate biological difference between races. Boas's primary interest—in symbolic and material culture and in language—was the study of processes of change; he therefore set out to determine whether bodily forms are also subject to processes of change. Boas studied 17,821 people, divided into seven ethno-national groups. Boas found that average measures of the cranial size of immigrants were significantly different from members of these groups who were born in the United States. Moreover, he discovered that average measures of the cranial size of children born within ten years of their mothers' arrival were significantly different from those of children born more than ten years after their mothers' arrival. Boas did not deny that physical features such as height or cranial size were inherited; he did, however, argue that the environment has an influence on these features, which is expressed through change over time. This work was central to his influential argument that differences between races were not immutable. Boas observed:

The head form, which has always been one of the most stable and permanent characteristics of human races, undergoes far-reaching changes due to the transfer of European races to American soil. The East European Hebrew, who has a round head, becomes more long-headed; the South Italian, who in Italy has an exceedingly long head, becomes more short-headed; so that both approach a uniform type in this country, so far as the head is concerned.

These findings were radical at the time and continue to be debated. In 2002, the anthropologists Corey S. Sparks and Richard L. Jantz claimed that differences between children born to the same parents in Europe and America were very small and insignificant and that there was no detectable effect of exposure to the American environment on the cranial index in children. They argued that their results contradicted Boas's original findings and demonstrated that they may no longer be used to support arguments of plasticity in cranial morphology. However, Jonathan Marks—a well-known physical anthropologist and former president of the General Anthropology section of the American Anthropological Association—has remarked that this revisionist study of Boas's work "has the ring of desperation to it (if not obfuscation), and has been quickly rebutted by more mainstream biological anthropology". In 2003 anthropologists Clarence C. Gravlee, H. Russell Bernard, and William R. Leonard reanalyzed Boas's data and concluded that most of Boas's original findings were correct. Moreover, they applied new statistical, computer-assisted methods to Boas's data and discovered more evidence for cranial plasticity. In a later publication, Gravlee, Bernard and Leonard reviewed Sparks and Jantz's analysis. They argue that Sparks and Jantz misrepresented Boas's claims and that Sparks's and Jantz's data actually support Boas. For example, they point out that Sparks and Jantz look at changes in cranial size in relation to how long an individual has been in the United States in order to test the influence of the environment. Boas, however, looked at changes in cranial size in relation to how long the mother had been in the United States. They argue that Boas's method is more useful because the prenatal environment is a crucial developmental factor.

A further publication by Jantz based on Gravlee et al. claims that Boas had cherry picked two groups of immigrants (Sicilians and Hebrews) which had varied most towards the same mean, and discarded other groups which had varied in the opposite direction. He commented, "Using the recent reanalysis by Gravlee et al. (2003), we can observe in Figure 2 that the maximum difference in the cranial index due to immigration (in Hebrews) is much smaller than the maximum ethnic difference, between Sicilians and Bohemians. It shows that long-headed parents produce long headed offspring and vice versa. To make the argument that children of immigrants converge onto an "American type" required Boas to use the two groups that changed the most."

Although some sociobiologists and evolutionary psychologists have suggested that Boas was opposed to Darwinian evolution, Boas, in fact, was a committed proponent of Darwinian evolutionary thought. In 1888, he declared that "the development of ethnology is largely due to the general recognition of the principle of biological evolution". Since Boas's times, physical anthropologists have established that the human capacity for culture is a product of human evolution. In fact, Boas's research on changes in body form played an important role in the rise of Darwinian theory. Boas was trained at a time when biologists had no understanding of genetics; Mendelian genetics became widely known only after 1900. Prior to that time biologists relied on the measurement of physical traits as empirical data for any theory of evolution. Boas's biometric studies led him to question the use of this method and kind of data. In a speech to anthropologists in Berlin in 1912, Boas argued that at best such statistics could only raise biological questions, and not answer them. It was in this context that anthropologists began turning to genetics as a basis for any understanding of biological variation.

=== Linguistics ===
Boas also contributed greatly to the foundation of linguistics as a science in the United States. He published many descriptive studies of Native American languages, wrote on theoretical difficulties in classifying languages, and laid out a research program for studying the relations between language and culture which his students such as Edward Sapir, Paul Rivet, and Alfred Kroeber followed.

His 1889 article "On Alternating Sounds", however, made a singular contribution to the methodology of both linguistics and cultural anthropology. It is a response to a paper presented in 1888 by Daniel Garrison Brinton, at the time a professor of American linguistics and archaeology at the University of Pennsylvania. Brinton observed that in the spoken languages of many Native Americans, certain sounds regularly alternated. Brinton argued that this pervasive inconsistency was a sign of linguistic and evolutionary inferiority.

Boas had heard similar phonetic shifts during his research in Baffin Island and in the Pacific Northwest. Nevertheless, he argued that "alternating sounds" is not at all a feature of Native American languages—indeed, he argued, they do not really exist. Rather than take alternating sounds as objective proof of different stages in cultural evolution, Boas considered them in terms of his longstanding interest in the subjective perception of objective physical phenomena. He also considered his earlier critique of evolutionary museum displays. There, he pointed out that two things (artifacts of material culture) that appear to be similar may, in fact, be quite different. In this article, he raises the possibility that two things (sounds) that appear to be different may, in fact, be the same.

In short, he shifted attention to the perception of different sounds. Boas begins by raising an empirical question: when people describe one sound in different ways, is it because they cannot perceive the difference, or might there be another reason? He immediately establishes that he is not concerned with cases involving perceptual deficit—the aural equivalent of color-blindness. He points out that the question of people who describe one sound in different ways is comparable to that of people who describe different sounds in one way. This is crucial for research in descriptive linguistics: when studying a new language, how are we to note the pronunciation of different words? (In this point, Boas anticipates and lays the groundwork for the distinction between phonemics and phonetics.) People may pronounce a word in a variety of ways and still recognize that they are using the same word. The issue, then, is not "that such sensations are not recognized in their individuality" (in other words, people recognize differences in pronunciations); rather, it is that sounds "are classified according to their similarity" (in other words, that people classify a variety of perceived sounds into one category). A comparable visual example would involve words for colors. The English word green can be used to refer to a variety of shades, hues, and tints. But there are some languages that have no word for green. In such cases, people might classify what we would call green as either yellow or blue. This is not an example of color-blindness—people can perceive differences in color, but they categorize similar colors in a different way than English speakers.

Boas applied these principles to his studies of Inuit languages. Researchers have reported a variety of spellings for a given word. In the past, researchers had interpreted this data in a number of ways—it could indicate local variations in the pronunciation of a word, or it could indicate different dialects. Boas argues an alternative explanation: that the difference is not in how Inuit pronounce the word, but rather in how English-speaking scholars perceive the pronunciation of the word. It is not that English speakers are physically incapable of perceiving the sound in question; rather, the phonetic system of English cannot accommodate the perceived sound.

Although Boas was making a very specific contribution to the methods of descriptive linguistics, his ultimate point is far reaching: observer bias need not be personal, it can be cultural. In other words, the perceptual categories of Western researchers may systematically cause a Westerner to misperceive or to fail to perceive entirely a meaningful element in another culture. As in his critique of Otis Mason's museum displays, Boas demonstrated that what appeared to be evidence of cultural evolution was really the consequence of unscientific methods and a reflection of Westerners' beliefs about their own cultural superiority. This point provides the methodological foundation for Boas's cultural relativism: elements of a culture are meaningful in that culture's terms, even if they may be meaningless (or take on a radically different meaning) in another culture.

=== Cultural anthropology ===
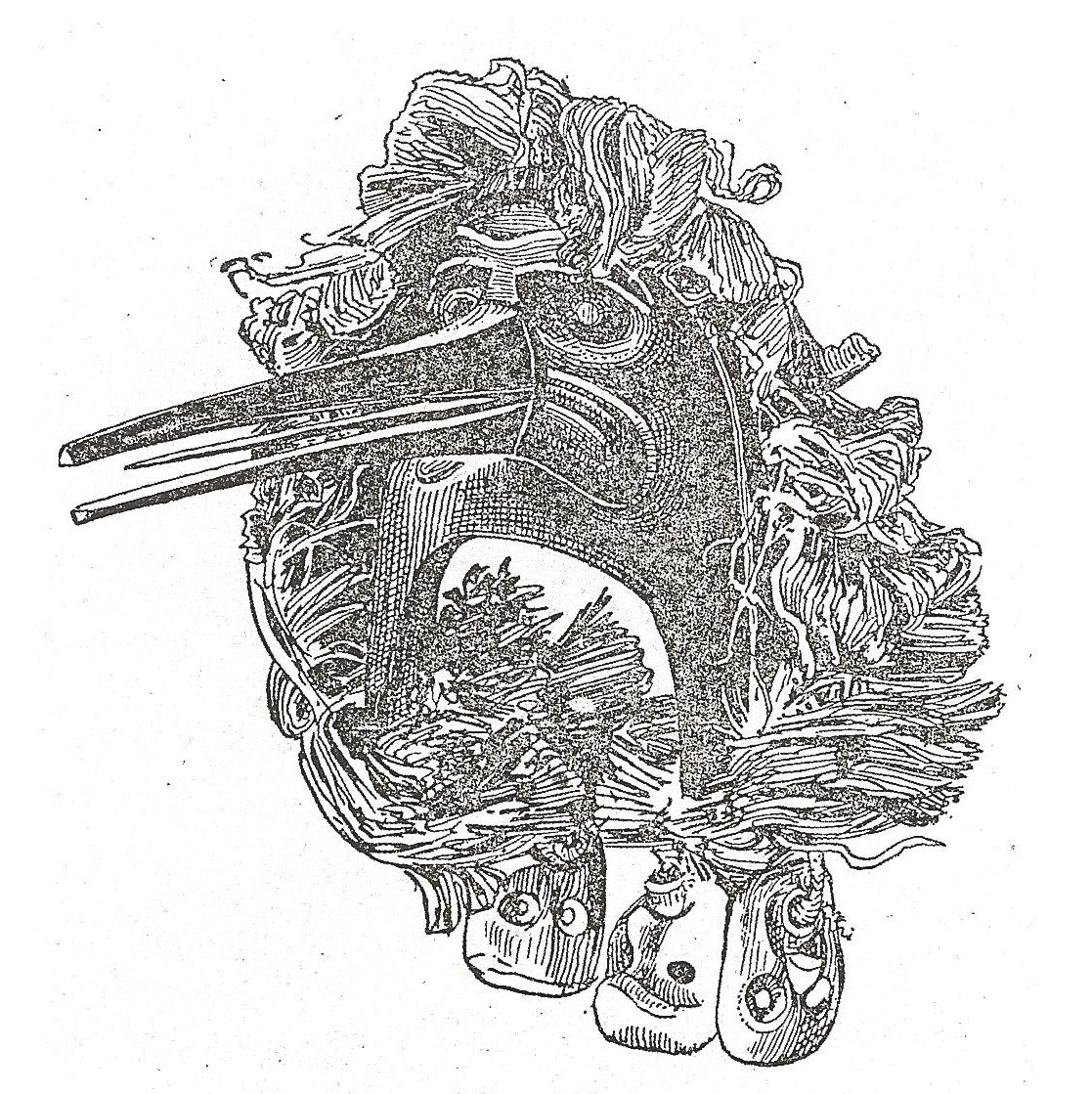
Drawing of a Kwakiutl mask from Boas's The Social Organization and the Secret Societies of the Kwakiutl Indians (1897). Wooden skulls hang from below the mask, which represents one of the cannibal bird helpers of Bakbakwalinooksiwey.

The essence of Boas's approach to ethnography is found in his early essay on "The Study of Geography". There he argued for an approach that

... considers every phenomenon as worthy of being studied for its own sake. Its mere existence entitles it to a full share of our attention, and the knowledge of its existence and evolution in space and time fully satisfies the student.

When Boas's student Ruth Benedict gave her presidential address to the American Anthropological Association in 1947, she reminded anthropologists of the importance of this idiographic stance by quoting literary critic A. C. Bradley: "We watch 'what is', seeing that so it happened and must have happened".

This orientation led Boas to promote a cultural anthropology characterized by a strong commitment to

- Empiricism (with a resulting skepticism of attempts to formulate "scientific laws" of culture)
- A notion of culture as fluid and dynamic
- Ethnographic fieldwork, in which the anthropologist resides for an extended period among the people being researched, conducts research in the native language, and collaborates with native researchers, as a method of collecting data, and
- Cultural relativism as a methodological tool while conducting fieldwork, and as a heuristic tool while analyzing data.

Boas argued that in order to understand "what is"—in cultural anthropology, the specific cultural traits (behaviors, beliefs, and symbols)—one had to examine them in their local context. He also understood that as people migrate from one place to another, and as the cultural context changes over time, the elements of a culture, and their meanings, will change, which led him to emphasize the importance of local histories for an analysis of cultures.

Although other anthropologists at the time, such as Bronisław Malinowski and Alfred Reginald Radcliffe-Brown focused on the study of societies, which they understood to be clearly bounded, Boas's attention to history, which reveals the extent to which traits diffuse from one place to another, led him to view cultural boundaries as multiple and overlapping, and as highly permeable. Thus, Boas's student Robert Lowie once described culture as a thing of "shreds and patches". Boas and his students understood that as people try to make sense of their world they seek to integrate its disparate elements, with the result that different cultures could be characterized as having different configurations or patterns. But Boasians also understood that such integration was always in tensions with diffusion, and any appearance of a stable configuration is contingent (see Bashkow 2004: 445).

During Boas's lifetime, as today, many Westerners saw a fundamental difference between modern societies, which are characterized by dynamism and individualism, and traditional societies, which are stable and homogeneous. Boas's empirical field research, however, led him to argue against this comparison. For example, his 1903 essay, "Decorative Designs of Alaskan Needlecases: A History of Conventional Designs, Based on Materials in a U.S. Museum", provides another example of how Boas made broad theoretical claims based on a detailed analysis of empirical data. After establishing formal similarities among the needlecases, Boas shows how certain formal features provide a vocabulary out of which individual artisans could create variations in design. Thus, his emphasis on culture as a context for meaningful action made him sensitive to individual variation within a society (William Henry Holmes suggested a similar point in an 1886 paper, "Origin and development of form and ornament in ceramic art", although unlike Boas he did not develop the ethnographic and theoretical implications).

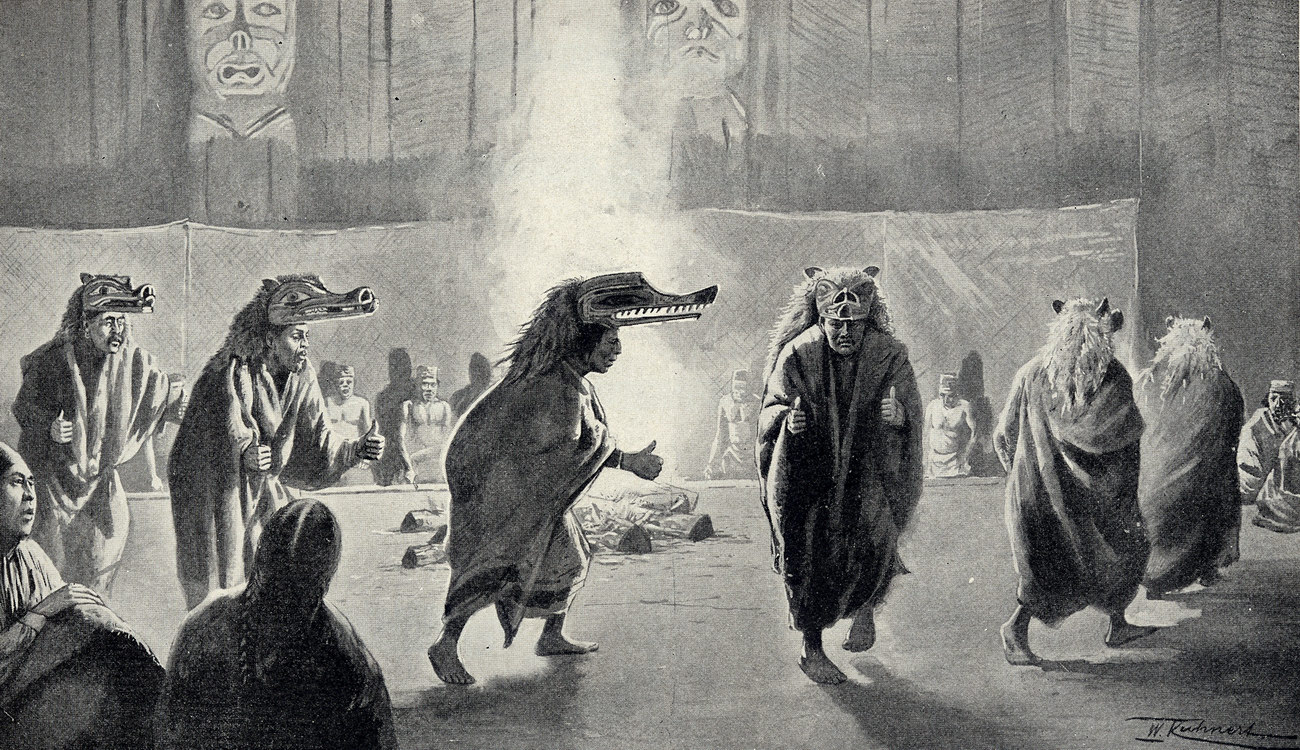
A painting by Wilhelm Kuhnert illustrates the 1894 potlatch ceremony at Tsaxis, titled "The Walas'axa". Painting printed as Plate 36 in the classic Kwakiutl study The Social Organization and the Secret Societies of the Kwakiutl Indians, written by Boas (1897).

In a programmatic essay in 1920, "The Methods of Ethnology", Boas argued that instead of "the systematic enumeration of standardized beliefs and customs of a tribe", anthropology needs to document "the way in which the individual reacts to his whole social environment, and to the difference of opinion and of mode of action that occur in primitive society and which are the causes of far-reaching changes". Boas argued that attention to individual agency reveals that "the activities of the individual are determined to a great extent by his social environment, but in turn, his own activities influence the society in which he lives and may bring about modifications in a form". Consequently, Boas thought of culture as fundamentally dynamic: "As soon as these methods are applied, primitive society loses the appearance of absolute stability ... All cultural forms rather appear in a constant state of flux ..." (see Lewis 2001b)

Having argued against the relevance of the distinction between literate and non-literate societies as a way of defining anthropology's object of study, Boas argued that non-literate and literate societies should be analyzed in the same way. Nineteenth-century historians had been applying the techniques of philology to reconstruct the histories of, and relationships between, literate societies. In order to apply these methods to non-literate societies, Boas argued that the task of fieldworkers is to produce and collect texts in non-literate societies. This took the form not only of compiling lexicons and grammars of the local language, but of recording myths, folktales, beliefs about social relationships and institutions, and even recipes for local cuisine. In order to do this, Boas relied heavily on the collaboration of literate native ethnographers (among the Kwakiutl, most often George Hunt), and he urged his students to consider such people valuable partners, inferior in their standing in Western society, but superior in their understanding of their own culture. (see Bunzl 2004: 438–439)

Using these methods, Boas published another article in 1920, in which he revisited his earlier research on Kwakiutl kinship. In the late 1890s, Boas had tried to reconstruct transformation in the organization of Kwakiutl clans, by comparing them to the organization of clans in other societies neighboring the Kwakiutl to the north and south. Now, however, he argued against translating the Kwakiutl principle of kin groups into an English word. Instead of trying to fit the Kwakiutl into some larger model, he tried to understand their beliefs and practices in their own terms. For example, whereas he had earlier translated the Kwakiutl word numaym as "clan", he now argued that the word is best understood as referring to a bundle of privileges, for which there is no English word. Men secured claims to these privileges through their parents or wives, and there were a variety of ways these privileges could be acquired, used, and transmitted from one generation to the next. As in his work on alternating sounds, Boas had come to realize that different ethnological interpretations of Kwakiutl kinship were the result of the limitations of Western categories. As in his work on Alaskan needlecases, he now saw variation among Kwakiutl practices as the result of the play between social norms and individual creativity.

Before his death in 1942, he appointed Helen Codere to edit and publish his manuscripts about the culture of the Kwakiutl people.

== Franz Boas and folklore ==
Franz Boas was an immensely influential figure throughout the development of folklore as a discipline. At first glance, it might seem that his only concern was for the discipline of anthropology—after all, he fought for most of his life to keep folklore as a part of anthropology. Yet Boas was motivated by his desire to see both anthropology and folklore become more professional and well-respected. Boas was afraid that if folklore was allowed to become its own discipline the standards for folklore scholarship would be lowered. This, combined with the scholarships of "amateurs", would lead folklore to be completely discredited, Boas believed.

In order to further professionalize folklore, Boas introduced the strict scientific methods which he learned in college to the discipline. Boas championed the use of exhaustive research, fieldwork, and strict scientific guidelines in folklore scholarship. Boas believed that a true theory could only be formed from thorough research and that even once you had a theory it should be treated as a "work in progress" unless it could be proved beyond doubt. This rigid scientific methodology was eventually accepted as one of the major tenets of folklore scholarship, and Boas's methods remain in use even today. Boas also nurtured many budding folklorists during his time as a professor, and some of his students are counted among the most notable minds in folklore scholarship.

Boas was passionate about the collection of folklore and believed that the similarity of folktales amongst different folk groups was due to dissemination. Boas strove to prove this theory, and his efforts produced a method for breaking a folktale into parts and then analyzing these parts. His creation of "catch-words" allowed for categorization of these parts, and the ability to analyze them in relation to other similar tales. Boas also fought to prove that not all cultures progressed along the same path, and that non-European cultures, in particular, were not primitive, but different.

Boas remained active in the development and scholarship of folklore throughout his life. He became the editor of the Journal of American Folklore in 1908, regularly wrote and published articles on folklore (often in the Journal of American Folklore). He helped to elect Louise Pound as president of the American Folklore Society in 1925.

== Scientist as activist ==
There are two things to which I am devoted: absolute academic and spiritual freedom, and the subordination of the state to the interests of the individual; expressed in other forms, the furthering of conditions in which the individual can develop to the best of his ability—as far as it is possible with a full understanding of the fetters imposed upon us by tradition; and the fight against all forms of power policy of states or private organizations. This means a devotion to principles of true democracy. I object to the teaching of slogans intended to befog the mind, of whatever kind they may be.

— letter from Boas to John Dewey, 11/6/39

Boas was known for passionately defending what he believed to be right. During his lifetime (and often through his work), Boas combated racism, berated anthropologists and folklorists who used their work as a cover for espionage, worked to protect German and Austrian scientists who fled the Nazi regime, and openly protested Hitlerism.

Many social scientists in other disciplines often agonize over the legitimacy of their work as "science" and consequently emphasize the importance of detachment, objectivity, abstraction, and quantifiability in their work. Perhaps because Boas, like other early anthropologists, was originally trained in the natural sciences, he and his students never expressed such anxiety. Moreover, he did not believe that detachment, objectivity, and quantifiability was required to make anthropology scientific. Since the object of study of anthropologists is different from the object of study of physicists, he assumed that anthropologists would have to employ different methods and different criteria for evaluating their research. Thus, Boas used statistical studies to demonstrate the extent to which variation in data is context-dependent, and argued that the context-dependent nature of human variation rendered many abstractions and generalizations that had been passing as scientific understandings of humankind (especially theories of social evolution popular at the time) in fact unscientific. His understanding of ethnographic fieldwork began with the fact that the objects of ethnographic study (e.g., the Inuit of Baffin Island) were not just objects, but subjects, and his research called attention to their creativity and agency. More importantly, he viewed the Inuit as his teachers, thus reversing the typical hierarchical relationship between scientist and object of study.

This emphasis on the relationship between anthropologists and those they study—the point that, while astronomers and stars; chemists and elements; botanists and plants are fundamentally different, anthropologists and those they study are equally human—implied that anthropologists themselves could be objects of anthropological study. Although Boas did not pursue this reversal systematically, his article on alternating sounds illustrates his awareness that scientists should not be confident about their objectivity, because they too see the world through the prism of their culture.

This emphasis also led Boas to conclude that anthropologists have an obligation to speak out on social issues. Boas was especially concerned with racial inequality, which his research had indicated is not biological in origin, but rather social. Boas is credited as the first scientist to publish the idea that all people—including white and African Americans—are equal. He often emphasized his abhorrence of racism, and used his work to show that there was no scientific basis for such a bias. An early example of this concern is evident in his 1906 commencement address to Atlanta University, at the invitation of W. E. B. Du Bois. Boas began by remarking that "If you did accept the view that the present weakness of the American Negro, his uncontrollable emotions, his lack of energy, are racially inherent, your work would still be noble one". He then went on, however, to argue against this view. To the claim that European and Asian civilizations are, at the time, more advanced than African societies, Boas objected that against the total history of humankind, the past two thousand years is but a brief span. Moreover, although the technological advances of our early ancestors (such as taming fire and inventing stone tools) might seem insignificant when compared to the invention of the steam engine or control over electricity, we should consider that they might actually be even greater accomplishments. Boas then went on to catalogue advances in Africa, such as smelting iron, cultivating millet, and domesticating chickens and cattle, that occurred in Africa well before they spread to Europe and Asia. (Evidence now suggests, however, that chickens were first domesticated in Southeast Asia and that cattle were first domesticated in Turkey and Pakistan.) He then described the activities of African kings, diplomats, merchants, and artists as evidence of cultural achievement. From this, he concluded, any social inferiority of Negroes in the United States cannot be explained by their African origins:

If therefore, it is claimed that your race is doomed to economic inferiority, you may confidently look to the home of your ancestors and say, that you have set out to recover for the colored people the strength that was their own before they set foot on the shores of this continent. You may say that you go to work with bright hopes and that you will not be discouraged by the slowness of your progress; for you have to recover not only what has been lost in transplanting the Negro race from its native soil to this continent, but you must reach higher levels than your ancestors ever had attained.

Boas proceeds to discuss the arguments for the inferiority of the "Negro race", and calls attention to the fact that they were brought to the Americas through force. For Boas, this is just one example of the many times conquest or colonialism has brought different peoples into an unequal relation, and he mentions "the conquest of England by the Normans, the Teutonic invasion of Italy, [and] the Manchu conquest of China" as resulting in similar conditions. But the best example, for Boas, of this phenomenon is that of the Jews in Europe:

Even now there lingers in the consciousness of the old, sharper divisions which the ages had not been able to efface, and which is strong enough to find—not only here and there—expression as antipathy to the Jewish type. In France, that let down the barriers more than a hundred years ago, the feeling of antipathy is still strong enough to sustain an anti-Jewish political party.

Boas's closing advice is that African Americans should not look to whites for approval or encouragement because people in power usually take a very long time to learn to sympathize with people out of power. "Remember that in every single case in history the process of adaptation has been one of exceeding slowness. Do not look for the impossible, but do not let your path deviate from the quiet and steadfast insistence on full opportunities for your powers."

Despite Boas's caveat about the intractability of white prejudice, he also considered it the scientist's responsibility to argue against white myths of racial purity and racial superiority and to use the evidence of his research to fight racism. At the time, Boas had no idea that speaking at Atlanta University would put him at odds with a different prominent Black figure, Booker T. Washington. Du Bois and Washington had different views on the means of uplifting Black Americans. By supporting Du Bois, Boas lost Washington's support and any chance of funding from his college, Carnegie Mellon University.

Boas was also critical of one nation imposing its power over others. In 1916, Boas wrote a letter to The New York Times which was published under the headline, "Why German-Americans Blame America". Although Boas did begin the letter by protesting bitter attacks against German-Americans at the time of the war in Europe, most of his letter was a critique of American nationalism. "In my youth, I had been taught in school and at home not only to love the good of my own country, but also to seek to understand and to respect the individualities of other nations. For this reason, one-sided nationalism, that is so often found nowadays, is to be unendurable." He writes of his love for American ideals of freedom, and of his growing discomfort with American beliefs about its own superiority over others.

I have always been of the opinion that we have no right to impose our ideals upon other nations, no matter how strange it may seem to us that they enjoy the kind of life they lead, how slow they may be in utilizing the resources of their countries, or how much opposed their ideas may be to ours ... Our intolerant attitude is most pronounced in regard to what we like to call "our free institutions." Modern democracy was no doubt the most wholesome and needed reaction against the abuses of absolutism and of a selfish, often corrupt, bureaucracy. That the wishes and thoughts of the people should find expression, and that the form of government should conform to these wishes is an axiom that has pervaded the whole Western world, and that is even taking root in the Far East. It is a quite different question, however, in how far the particular machinery of democratic government is identical with democratic institutions ... To claim as we often do, that our solution is the only democratic and the ideal one is a one-sided expression of Americanism. I see no reason why we should not allow the Germans, Austrians, and Russians, or whoever else it may be, to solve their problems in their own ways, instead of demanding that they bestow upon themselves the benefactions of our regime.

Although Boas felt that scientists have a responsibility to speak out on social and political problems, he was appalled that they might involve themselves in disingenuous and deceitful ways. Thus, in 1919, when he discovered that four anthropologists, in the course of their research in other countries, were serving as spies for the American government, he wrote an angry letter to The Nation. It is perhaps in this letter that he most clearly expresses his understanding of his commitment to science:

A soldier whose business is murder as a fine art, a diplomat whose calling is based on deception and secretiveness, a politician whose very life consists in compromises with his conscience, a businessman whose aim is personal profit within the limits allowed by a lenient law—such may be excused if they set patriotic deception above common everyday decency and perform services as spies. They merely accept the code of morality to which modern society still conforms. Not so the scientist. The very essence of his life is the service of truth. We all know scientists who in private life do not come up to the standard of truthfulness, but who, nevertheless, would not consciously falsify the results of their researches. It is bad enough if we have to put up with these because they reveal a lack of strength of character that is liable to distort the results of their work. A person, however, who uses science as a cover for political spying, who demeans himself to pose before a foreign government as an investigator and asks for assistance in his alleged researches in order to carry on, under this cloak, his political machinations, prostitutes science in an unpardonable way and forfeits the right to be classed as a scientist.

Although Boas did not name the spies in question, he was referring to a group led by Sylvanus G. Morley, who was affiliated with Harvard University's Peabody Museum. While conducting research in Mexico, Morley and his colleagues looked for evidence of German submarine bases, and collected intelligence on Mexican political figures and German immigrants in Mexico.

Boas's stance against spying took place in the context of his struggle to establish a new model for academic anthropology at Columbia University. Previously, American anthropology was based at the Smithsonian Institution in Washington and the Peabody Museum at Harvard, and these anthropologists competed with Boas's students for control over the American Anthropological Association (and its flagship publication American Anthropologist). When the National Academy of Sciences established the National Research Council in 1916 as a means by which scientists could assist the United States government to prepare for entry into the war in Europe, competition between the two groups intensified. Boas's rival, W. H. Holmes (who had gotten the job of Director at the Field Museum for which Boas had been passed over 26 years earlier), was appointed to head the NRC; Morley was a protégé of Holmes's.

When Boas's letter was published, Holmes wrote to a friend complaining about "the Prussian control of anthropology in this country" and the need to end Boas's "Hun regime". Reaction of Holmes and his allies was influenced by anti-German and probably also by anti-Jewish sentiment. The Anthropological Society of Washington passed a resolution condemning Boas's letter for unjustly criticizing President Wilson; attacking the principles of American democracy; and endangering anthropologists abroad, who would now be suspected of being spies. This resolution was passed on to the American Anthropological Association (AAA) and the National Research Council. Members of the American Anthropological Association (among whom Boas was a founding member in 1902), meeting at the Peabody Museum of Archaeology and Ethnology at Harvard (with which Morley, Lothrop, and Spinden were affiliated), voted by 20 to 10 to censure Boas. As a result, Boas resigned as the AAA's representative to the NRC, although he remained an active member of the AAA. The AAA's censure of Boas was not rescinded until 2005.

Boas continued to speak out against racism and for intellectual freedom. When the Nazi Party in Germany denounced "Jewish Science" (which included not only Boasian Anthropology but Freudian psychoanalysis and Einsteinian physics), Boas responded with a public statement signed by over 8,000 other scientists, declaring that there is only one science, to which race and religion are irrelevant. After World War I, Boas created the Emergency Society for German and Austrian Science. This organization was originally dedicated to fostering friendly relations between American and German and Austrian scientists and for providing research funding to German scientists who had been adversely affected by the war, and to help scientists who had been interned. With the rise of Nazi Germany, Boas assisted German scientists in fleeing the Nazi regime. Boas helped these scientists not only to escape but to secure positions once they arrived. Additionally, Boas addressed an open letter to Paul von Hindenburg in protest against Hitlerism. He also wrote an article in The American Mercury arguing that there were no differences between Aryans and non-Aryans and the German government should not base its policies on such a false premise.

Boas, and his students such as Melville J. Herskovits, opposed the racist pseudoscience developed at the Kaiser Wilhelm Institute of Anthropology, Human Heredity, and Eugenics under its director Eugen Fischer: "Melville J. Herskovits (one of Franz Boas's students) pointed out that the health problems and social prejudices encountered by these children (Rhineland Bastards) and their parents explained what Germans viewed as racial inferiority was not due to racial heredity. This "provoked polemic invective against the latter [Boas] from Fischer. "The views of Mr. Boas are in part quite ingenious, but in the field of heredity Mr. Boas is by no means competent" even though "a great number of research projects at the KWI-A which had picked up on Boas's studies about immigrants in New York had confirmed his findings—including the study by Walter Dornfeldt about Eastern European Jews in Berlin. Fischer resorted to polemic simply because he had no arguments to counter the Boasians' critique."

== Students and influence ==
Franz Boas died suddenly at the Columbia University Faculty Club on December 21, 1942, in the arms of Claude Lévi-Strauss. By that time he had become one of the most influential and respected scientists of his generation.

Between 1901 and 1911, Columbia University produced seven PhDs in anthropology. Although by today's standards this is a very small number, at the time it was sufficient to establish Boas's Anthropology Department at Columbia as the preeminent anthropology program in the country. Moreover, many of Boas's students went on to establish anthropology programs at other major universities.

Boas's first doctoral student at Columbia was Alfred L. Kroeber (1901), who, along with fellow Boas student Robert Lowie (1908), started the anthropology program at the University of California, Berkeley. He also trained William Jones (1904), one of the first Native American Indian anthropologists (Meskwaki) who was killed while conducting research in the Philippines in 1909, and Albert B. Lewis (1907). Boas also trained a number of other students who were influential in the development of academic anthropology: Frank Speck (1908) who trained with Boas but received his PhD from the University of Pennsylvania and immediately proceeded to found the anthropology department there; Edward Sapir (1909) and Fay-Cooper Cole (1914) who developed the anthropology program at the University of Chicago; Alexander Goldenweiser (1910), who, with Elsie Clews Parsons (who received her doctorate in sociology from Columbia in 1899, but then studied ethnology with Boas), started the anthropology program at the New School for Social Research; Leslie Spier (1920) who started the anthropology program at the University of Washington together with his wife Erna Gunther, also one of Boas's students, and Melville Herskovits (1923) who started the anthropology program at Northwestern University. He also trained John R. Swanton (who studied with Boas at Columbia for two years before receiving his doctorate from Harvard in 1900), Paul Radin (1911), Ruth Benedict (1923), Gladys Reichard (1925) who had begun teaching at Barnard College in 1921 and was later promoted to the rank of professor, Elizabeth Kilgore Steen (1926 and first white woman to enter the remote Matto Grosso area in interior Brazil), Ruth Bunzel (1929), Alexander Lesser (1929), Lucy Kramer Cohen (1929), Margaret Mead (1929), and Gene Weltfish (who defended her dissertation in 1929, although she did not officially graduate until 1950 when Columbia reduced the expenses required to graduate), E. Adamson Hoebel (1934), Jules Henry (1935), George Herzog (1938), and Ashley Montagu (1938).

His students at Columbia also included Mexican anthropologist Manuel Gamio, who earned his Master of Arts degree after studying with Boas from 1909 to 1911, and became the founding director of Mexico's Bureau of Anthropology in 1917; Clark Wissler, who received his doctorate in psychology from Columbia University in 1901, but proceeded to study anthropology with Boas before turning to research Native Americans; Esther Schiff, later Goldfrank, worked with Boas in the summers of 1920 to 1922 to conduct research among the Cochiti and Laguna Pueblo Indians in New Mexico; Gilberto Freyre, who shaped the concept of "racial democracy" in Brazil; Viola Garfield, who carried forth Boas's Tsimshian work; Frederica de Laguna, who worked on the Inuit and the Tlingit; anthropologist, folklorist and novelist Zora Neale Hurston, who graduated from Barnard College, the women's college associated with Columbia, in 1928, and who studied African American and Afro-Caribbean folklore, and Ella Cara Deloria, who worked closely with Boas on the linguistics of Native American languages.

Boas and his students were also an influence on Claude Lévi-Strauss, who interacted with Boas and the Boasians during his stay in New York in the 1940s.

Several of Boas's students went on to serve as editors of the American Anthropological Association's flagship journal, American Anthropologist: John R. Swanton (1911, 1921–1923), Robert Lowie (1924–1933), Leslie Spier (1934–1938), and Melville Herskovits (1950–1952). Edward Sapir's student John Alden Mason was editor from 1945 to 1949, and Alfred Kroeber and Robert Lowie's student, Walter Goldschmidt, was editor from 1956 to 1959. His last student Marian Smith was President of the American Anthropological Association and the honorary secretary of the Royal Anthropological Institute in London.

Most of Boas's students shared his concern for careful, historical reconstruction, and his antipathy towards speculative, evolutionary models. Moreover, Boas encouraged his students, by example, to criticize themselves as much as others. For example, Boas originally defended the cephalic index (systematic variations in head form) as a method for describing hereditary traits, but came to reject his earlier research after further study; he similarly came to criticize his own early work in Kwakiutl (Pacific Northwest) language and mythology.

Encouraged by this drive to self-criticism, as well as the Boasian commitment to learn from one's informants and to let the findings of one's research shape one's agenda, Boas's students quickly diverged from his own research agenda. Several of his students soon attempted to develop theories of the grand sort that Boas typically rejected. Kroeber called his colleagues' attention to Sigmund Freud and the potential of a union between cultural anthropology and psychoanalysis. Ruth Benedict developed theories of "culture and personality" and "national cultures", and Kroeber's student, Julian Steward developed theories of "cultural ecology" and "multilineal evolution".

== Legacy ==
Nevertheless, Boas has had an enduring influence on anthropology. Virtually all anthropologists today accept Boas's commitment to empiricism and his methodological cultural relativism. Moreover, virtually all cultural anthropologists today share Boas's commitment to field research involving extended residence, learning the local language, and developing social relationships with informants. Finally, anthropologists continue to honor his critique of racial ideologies. In his 1963 book, Race: The History of an Idea in America, Thomas Gossett wrote that "It is possible that Boas did more to combat race prejudice than any other person in history."

== Leadership roles and honors ==
- 1887—Accepted a position as Assistant Editor of Science in New York.
- 1889—Appointed as the head of a newly created department of anthropology. His adjunct was L. Farrand.
- 1896—Became assistant curator at the American Museum of Natural History, under F. W. Putnam. This was combined with a lecturing position at Columbia University.
- 1900—Elected to the National Academy of Sciences in April.
- 1901—Appointed Honorary Philologist of Bureau of American Ethnology.
- 1903—Elected to the American Philosophical Society.
- 1908—Became editor of The Journal of American Folklore.
- 1908—Elected a member of the American Antiquarian Society.
- 1910—Helped create the International School of American Archeology and Ethnology in Mexico.
- 1910—Elected president of the New York Academy of Sciences.
- 1913—Became founding editor of Columbia University Contributions to Anthropology (Columbia University Press)
- 1917—Founded the International Journal of American Linguistics.
- 1917—Edited the Publications of the American Ethnological Society.
- 1931—Elected president of the American Association for the Advancement of Science.
- 1936—Became "emeritus in residence" at Columbia University in 1936. Became "emeritus" in 1938.

== Works ==
- Boas n.d. "The relation of Darwin to anthropology", notes for a lecture; Boas papers (B/B61.5) American Philosophical Society, Philadelphia. Published online by Herbert Lewis 2001b.
- Boas, Franz (1889). The Houses of the Kwakiutl Indians, British Columbia (PDF). Proceedings of the United States National Museum. Vol. 11. Washington D.C.: United States National Museum. pp. 197–213. doi:10.5479/si.00963801.11-709.197. hdl:10088/13090.
- Boas, Franz (1895). The Social Organization and the Secret Societies of the Kwakiutl Indians (PDF). Report of the United States National Museum. Washington, DC: United States National Museum. pp. 197–213. hdl:10088/29967.
- Boas, Franz (1897). "The Decorative Art of the Indians of the North Pacific Coast" (PDF). Science. Bulletin of the American Museum of Natural History. IX (82) X. New York: American Museum of Natural History: 101–3. doi:10.1126/science.4.82.101. hdl:2246/539. PMID 17747165.
- Boas, Franz (1898). The Mythology of the Bella Coola Indians (PDF). Memoirs of the American Museum of Natural History. Publications of the Jesup North Pacific Expedition. Vol. II, Pt. II. New York: American Museum of Natural History. hdl:2246/31.
- Teit, James; Boas, Franz (1900). The Thompson Indians of British Columbia (PDF). Memoirs of the American Museum of Natural History. The Jesup North Pacific Expedition. Vol. II, Pt. IV. New York: American Museum of Natural History. hdl:2246/13.
- Boas, Franz (1901). "A Bronze Figurine from British Columbia" (PDF). Bulletin of the American Museum of Natural History. XIV X. New York: American Museum of Natural History. hdl:2246/1543.
- Boas, Franz; Hunt, George (1902). Kwakiutl Texts (PDF). Memoirs of the American Museum of Natural History. Publications of the Jesup North Pacific Expedition. Vol. V, Pt. I. New York: American Museum of Natural History. hdl:2246/23.
- Boas, Franz; Hunt, George (1902). Kwakiutl Texts (PDF). Memoirs of the American Museum of Natural History. Publications of the Jesup North Pacific Expedition. Vol. V, Pt. II. New York: American Museum of Natural History. hdl:2246/23.
- Boas, Franz; Hunt, George (1905). Kwakiutl Texts (PDF). Memoirs of the American Museum of Natural History. Publications of the Jesup North Pacific Expedition. Vol. V, Pt. III. New York: American Museum of Natural History. hdl:2246/23.
- Boas, Franz; Hunt, George (1906). Kwakiutl Texts - Second Series (PDF). Memoirs of the American Museum of Natural History. Publications of the Jesup North Pacific Expedition. Vol. X, Pt. I. New York: American Museum of Natural History. hdl:2246/22.
- Boas, Franz (1906). The Measurement of Differences Between Variable Quantities. New York: The Science Press.
- Boas, Franz (1909). The Kwakiutl of Vancouver Island (PDF). Memoirs of the American Museum of Natural History. Publications of the Jesup North Pacific Expedition. Vol. II, Pt. II. New York: American Museum of Natural History. hdl:2246/15.
- Boas, Franz (1911). "Handbook of American Indian languages". Bureau of American Ethnology. 40 (1). hdl:10088/15507.
- Boas, Franz (July–September 1912). "Changes in the Bodily Form of Descendants of Immigrants". American Anthropologist. 14 (3): 530–562. doi:10.1525/aa.1912.14.3.02a00080. JSTOR 659886.
- Boas, Franz (1912). "The History of the American Race". Annals of the New York Academy of Sciences. XXI (1): 177–183. Bibcode:1912NYASA..21..177B. doi:10.1111/j.1749-6632.1911.tb56933.x. S2CID 144256357.
- Boas, Franz (October–December 1914). "Mythology and folk-tales of the North American Indians". Journal of American Folklore. 27 (106): 374–410. doi:10.2307/534740. JSTOR 534740.
- Boas, Franz (1917). Folk-tales of Salishan and Sahaptin tribes (DJVU). Washington State Library's Classics in Washington History collection. Published for the American Folk-Lore Society by G.E. Stechert.
- Boas, Franz (1917). "Kutenai Tales" (PDF). Bureau of American Ethnology Bulletin. Washington State Library's Classics in Washington History collection. 59. Smithsonian Institution. hdl:10088/15526. Archived (PDF) from the original on 2019-08-11.
- Boas, Franz (June 1922). "Report on an Anthropometric Investigation of the Population of the United States". Journal of the American Statistical Association. 18 (138): 181–209. doi:10.1080/01621459.1922.10502461.
- Boas, Franz (September 1927). "The Eruption of Deciduous Teeth Among Hebrew Infants". The Journal of Dental Research. VII (3).
- Boas, Franz (July 1935). "The Tempo of Growth of Fraternities". Proceedings of the National Academy of Sciences. 21 (7): 413–418. Bibcode:1935PNAS...21..413B. doi:10.1073/pnas.21.7.413. PMC 1076617. PMID 16587991.
- Boas, Franz (1938) [1911]. The Mind of Primitive Man (Revised ed.). Macmillan.
- Boas, Franz, ed. (1944) [1938]. General Anthropology. War Department Education Manual. Vol. 226. Washington, DC: Heath.
- Boas, Franz (1945). Race and Democratic Society. New York: Augustin. OCLC 1049491147.
- Boas, Franz (2010) [1927]. Primitive Art. New York: Dover Books. ISBN 978-0-486-20025-5.
- Boas, Franz (1962) [1928]. Anthropology and Modern Life. W. W. Norton. OL 23278195M.
- Boas, Franz (1974). Stocking, George W. Jr. (ed.). A Franz Boas Reader: The Shaping of American Anthropology, 1883–1911. University of Chicago Press. ISBN 978-0-226-06243-3.
- Boas, Franz (1966). Codere, Helen (ed.). Kwakiutl Ethnography. Chicago: University of Chicago Press.
- Boas, Franz (1982) [1940]. Race, Language, and Culture. University of Chicago Press. ISBN 978-0-226-06241-9.
- Boas, Franz (2002). Bouchard, Randy; Kennedy, Dorothy I. D. (eds.). Indian Myths & Legends from the North Pacific Coast of America: A Translation of Franz Boas' 1895 Edition of Indianische Sagen von der Nord-Pacifischen Küste-Amerikas. Translated by Bertz, Dietrich. Vancouver, BC: Talonbooks. ISBN 978-0-88922-553-4.
- Boas, Franz (2026). Arzyutov, Dmitry; Kan, Sergei; Siragusa, Laura; Pershai, Alexander (eds.). Paper Bridges Between Franz Boas and Russian Anthropology. Lincoln: University of Nebraska Press and the American Philosophical Society. ISBN 9781496238825.
