= Ruth Benedict =

American anthropologist and folklorist (1887–1948)

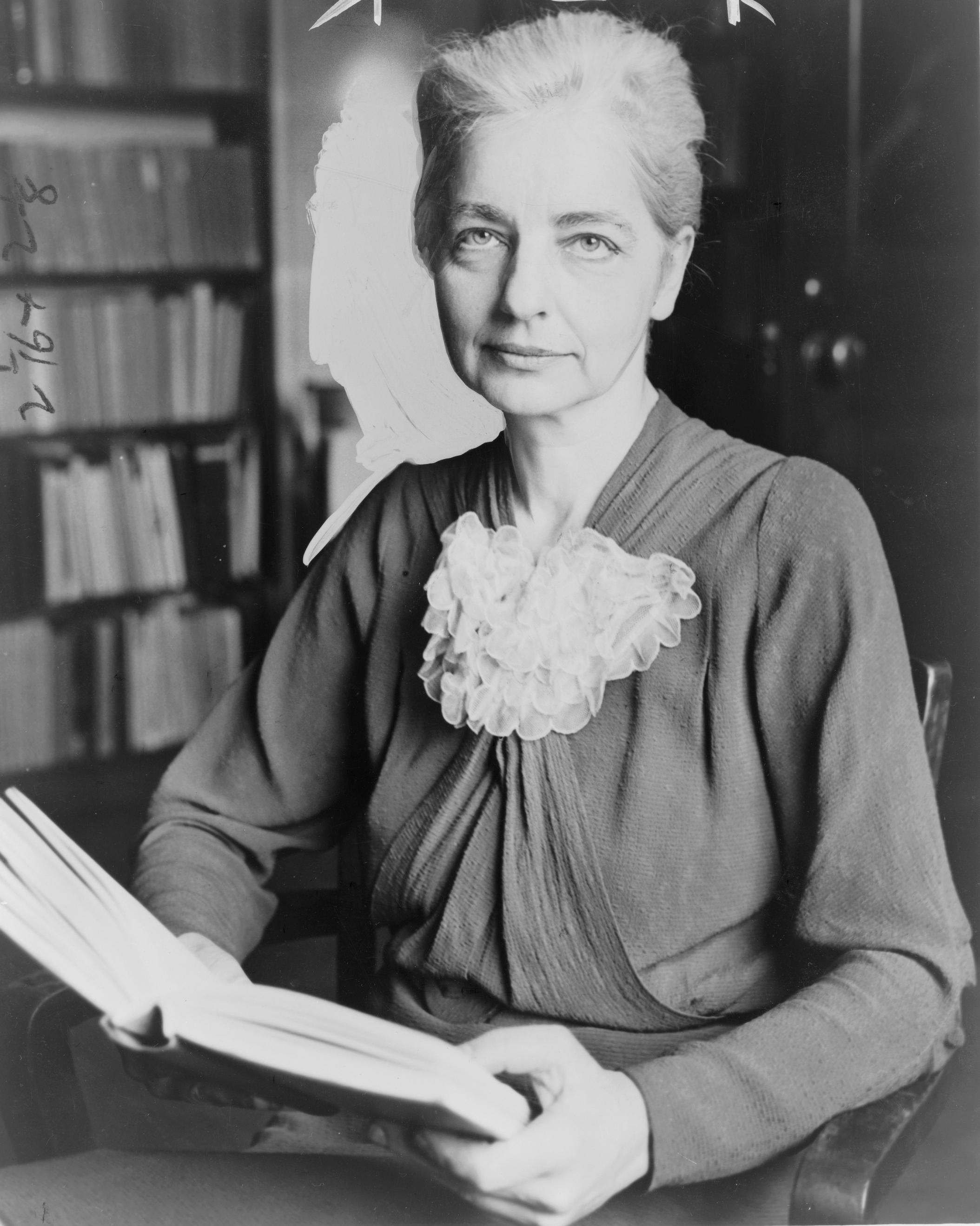
- Benedict in 1937
- Born: Ruth Fulton; June 5, 1887; New York City, U.S.
- Died: September 17, 1948 (aged 61); New York City, U.S.
- Education: Vassar College (AB); New School of Social Research; Columbia University (PhD)
- Occupation: Anthropologist
- Spouse: Stanley Rossiter Benedict

Ruth Fulton Benedict (June 5, 1887 – September 17, 1948) was an American anthropologist and folklorist.

She was born in New York City, attended Vassar College, and graduated in 1909. After studying anthropology at the New School of Social Research under Elsie Clews Parsons, she entered graduate studies at Columbia University in 1921, where she studied under Franz Boas. She received her Ph.D. and joined the faculty in 1923. Margaret Mead, with whom she shared a romantic relationship, Marvin Opler, Ruth Landes, and Vera D. Rubin were among her students and colleagues.

Benedict was president of the American Anthropological Association and also a prominent member of the American Folklore Society. She became the first woman to be recognized as a prominent leader of a learned profession. She can be viewed as a transitional figure in her field for redirecting both anthropology and folklore away from the limited confines of culture-trait diffusion studies and towards theories of performance as integral to the interpretation of culture. She studied the relationships between personality, art, language, and culture and insisted that no trait existed in isolation or self-sufficiency, a theory that she championed in her 1934 book Patterns of Culture.

== Early biography ==
=== Childhood ===
Benedict was born Ruth Fulton in New York City on June 5, 1887, to Beatrice (Shattuck) and Frederick Fulton. Her mother worked in the city as a school teacher, and her father was a homeopathic doctor and surgeon. Fulton loved his work and research, but they eventually led to his premature death, as he acquired an unknown disease during one of his surgeries in 1888. His illness caused the family to move back to Norwich, New York, to the farm of Ruth's maternal grandparents, the Shattucks. A year later, he died ten days after he had returned from a trip to Trinidad to search for a cure.

Beatrice Fulton was deeply affected by her husband's passing. Any mention of him overwhelmed her with grief; every March, she cried at church and in bed. Ruth hated her mother's sorrow and viewed it as a weakness. For Ruth, the greatest taboos were crying in front of people and showing expressions of pain. She reminisced, "I did not love my mother; I resented her cult of grief." The psychological effects on her childhood were thus profound, since "in one stroke she [Ruth] experienced the loss of the two most nourishing and protective people around her—the loss of her father at death and her mother to grief".

As a toddler, she contracted measles, which left her partially deaf; that was not discovered until she began school. Ruth had a fascination with death as a young child. When she was four years old, her grandmother took her to see an infant that had recently died. Upon seeing the dead child's face, Ruth claimed that it was the most beautiful thing she had ever seen.

At seven, Ruth began to write short verses and to read any book that she could get her hands on. Her favorite author was Jean Ingelow, and her favorite readings were A Legend of Bregenz and The Judas Tree. Through writing, she gained approval from her family. Writing was her outlet, and she wrote with an insightful perception about human reality. For example, in her senior year of high school, she wrote a piece, "Lulu's Wedding (A True Story)", in which she recalled the wedding of a family serving-girl. Instead of romanticizing the event, she revealed the true unromantic arranged marriage that Lulu went through because the man would take her even though he was much older.

Although her fascination with death started at an early age, she continued to study how death affected people throughout her career. In her book Patterns of Culture, Benedict shows how the Pueblo culture dealt with grieving and death. She describes in the book that individuals may deal with reactions to death, such as frustration and grief, differently from one another. Societies all have social norms that they follow; some allow more expression in dealing with death, such as mourning, but other societies do not permit its acknowledgement.

=== College and marriage ===
After high school, Ruth and her sister entered St Margaret's School for Girls, a college preparatory school, with help from a full-time scholarship. The girls were successful in school and entered Vassar College in September 1905, where Ruth thrived in an all-female atmosphere. Stories were then circulating that going to college led girls to become childless and remain unmarried. Nevertheless, Ruth explored her interests in college and found writing as her way of expressing herself as an "intellectual radical" - as her classmates sometimes labelled her. The author Walter Pater (1839–1894) influenced her greatly during this time as she strove to be like him and to live a well-lived life. She graduated with her sister in 1909 with a major in English literature. Unsure of what to do after college, she received an invitation from a wealthy trustee of the college to go on an all-expense-paid tour of Europe. Accompanied by two girls from California whom she had never met, Katherine Norton and Elizabeth Atsatt, she traveled through France, Switzerland, Italy, Germany, and England for one year with the opportunity of various home-stays throughout the trip.

Over the next few years, Ruth took up many different jobs. She first tried paid social work for the Charity Organization Society; later she accepted a job as a teacher at the Westlake School for Girls in Los Angeles, California. While working there, she developed an interest in Asia that would later affect her choice of fieldwork as a working anthropologist. However, she was unhappy with that job as well and, after one year, left to teach English in Pasadena at the Orton School for Girls. Those years were difficult, and she experienced depression and severe loneliness. However, through reading authors like Walt Whitman and Richard Jefferies, who stressed a worth, importance, and enthusiasm for life, she held onto hope for a better future.

The summer after her first year teaching at the Orton School, she returned home to the Shattucks' farm to spend some time in thought and peace. There, Stanley Rossiter Benedict, an engineer at Cornell Medical College, began to visit her at the farm. She had met him by chance in Buffalo, New York around 1910. That summer, Ruth fell deeply in love with Stanley as he began to visit her more, and she accepted his proposal for marriage. Invigorated by love, she undertook several writing projects to keep busy besides the everyday housework chores in her new life with Stanley. She began to publish poems under different pseudonyms: Ruth Stanhope, Edgar Stanhope, and Anne Singleton. She also began work on writing a biography of Mary Wollstonecraft and other lesser-known women who she felt deserved more acknowledgement for their work and contributions.

By 1918, the couple had begun to drift apart. Stanley suffered an injury that made him want to spend more time away from the city, and Ruth was not happy when the couple moved to Bedford Hills, far away from the city.

== Career in anthropology ==
=== Education and early career ===
In her search for a career, she decided to attend some lectures at the New School for Social Research while looking into the possibility of becoming an educational philosopher. While at the school, she took a class called "Sex in Ethnology" taught by Elsie Clews Parsons. She enjoyed the class and took another anthropology course with Alexander Goldenweiser, a student of noted anthropologist Franz Boas. With Goldenweiser as her teacher, Ruth's love for anthropology steadily grew. As close friend and lover Margaret Mead explained, "Anthropology made the first 'sense' that any ordered approach to life had ever made to Ruth Benedict." After working with Goldenweiser for a year, he sent her to work as a graduate student with Boas at Columbia University in 1921. She developed a close friendship with Boas, who took on a role as a kind of father figure in her life. Benedict lovingly referred to him as "Papa Franz."

Boas gave her graduate credit for the courses that she had completed at the New School for Social Research. Benedict wrote her dissertation, "The Concept of the Guardian Spirit in North America," and received her PhD in anthropology in 1923. Benedict also started a friendship with Edward Sapir, who encouraged her to continue the study of the relations between individual creativity and cultural patterns. Sapir and Benedict shared an interest in poetry and read and critiqued each other's work; both submitted to the same publishers and both were rejected. Both also were interested in psychology and the relation between individual personalities and cultural patterns, and in their correspondences, they frequently psychoanalyzed each other. However, Sapir showed little understanding for Benedict's private thoughts and feelings. In particular, his conservative gender ideology jarred with Benedict's struggle for emancipation. While they were very close friends for a while, the differences in worldview and personality ultimately led to strain in their friendship.

Benedict taught her first anthropology course at Barnard College in 1922; among the students was Margaret Mead. Benedict was a significant influence on Mead. Boas regarded Benedict as an asset to the anthropology department, and in 1931, he appointed her as assistant professor in anthropology, something that was impossible until her divorce from Stanley Benedict that same year. Over the twenty years from 1921 to 1940, the department awarded nearly as many PhD's to women (19) as men (20), an exceptional level of gender equity not approached elsewhere.

One student who felt especially fond of Benedict was Ruth Landes. Letters that Landes sent to Benedict state that she was enthralled by the way in which Benedict taught her classes and with the way that she forced the students to think in an unconventional way.

When Boas retired in 1937, most of his students considered Benedict to be the obvious choice for the head of the anthropology department. However, the administration of Columbia was not as progressive in its attitude towards female professionals as Boas had been, and the university president, Nicholas Murray Butler, was eager to curb the influence of the Boasians whom he considered to be political radicals. Instead, Ralph Linton, one of Boas's former students, a World War I veteran and a fierce critic of Benedict's "Culture and Personality" approach, was named head of the department. Benedict was understandably insulted by Linton's appointment, and the Columbia department was divided between the two rival figures of Linton and Benedict, both accomplished anthropologists with influential publications, neither of whom ever mentioned the work of the other.

=== Relationship with Margaret Mead ===
Margaret Mead and Ruth Benedict were two of the most influential and famous anthropologists of their time. They got along well with their shared passion for each other's work and the sense of pride that they felt in being successful working women while that was still uncommon. They were frequently known to critique each other's work; they entered into a companionship that began through their work, but during its early period, it also had an erotic character. Both Benedict and Mead wanted to dislodge stereotypes about women that were widely believed during their time and to show people that working women could also be successful even though working society was seen as a man's world. In her memoir about her parents, With a Daughter's Eye, Mead's daughter strongly implies that the relationship between Benedict and Mead was partly sexual.

In 1946, Benedict received the Achievement Award from the American Association of University Women. After Benedict died of a heart attack in 1948, Mead kept the legacy of Benedict's work going by supervising projects that Benedict would have looked after and by editing and publishing notes from studies that Benedict had collected throughout her life.

=== Postwar ===
Before World War II began, Benedict had been giving lectures at Bryn Mawr College for the Anna Howard Shaw Memorial Lectureship. The lectures were focused around the idea of synergy. However, World War II made her focus on other areas of concentration of anthropology, and the lectures were never presented in their entirety. During the war, she worked for the Office of War Information, preparing "national character" studies on different countries. After the war, she focused on finishing her book The Chrysanthemum and the Sword, which grew out of this work. Her original notes for the synergy lecture were never found after her death. In 1947, she was elected a Fellow of the American Academy of Arts and Sciences, as well as president of the American Anthropological Association. She continued her teaching after the war and advanced to the rank of full professor only two months before her death in New York on September 17, 1948.

== Work ==
=== Patterns of Culture ===
Benedict's Patterns of Culture (1934) was translated into fourteen languages and was for years published in many editions and used as standard reading material for anthropology courses in American universities.

The essential idea in Patterns of Culture is, according to the foreword by Margaret Mead, her view that human cultures are 'personality writ large." As Benedict wrote in that book, "A culture, like an individual, is a more or less consistent pattern of thought and action." Each culture, she held, chooses from "the great arc of human potentialities" only a few characteristics, which become the leading personality traits of the persons living in that culture. Those traits comprise an interdependent constellation of aesthetics and values in each culture which together add up to a unique gestalt.

For example, she described the emphasis on restraint in Pueblo cultures of the American Southwest and the emphasis on abandon in the Native American cultures of the Great Plains. She used the Nietzschean opposites of "Apollonian" and "Dionysian" as the stimulus for her thought about these Native American cultures.

She describes how in ancient Greece the worshipers of Apollo emphasized order and calm in their celebrations. In contrast, the worshipers of Dionysus, the god of wine, emphasized wildness, abandon, and letting go, like Native American groups living on the Great Plains. She described in detail the contrasts between rituals, beliefs, and personal preferences among people of diverse cultures to show how each culture had a "personality", which was encouraged in each individual.

Other anthropologists of the culture and personality school also developed those ideas, notably Margaret Mead in her Coming of Age in Samoa (published before "Patterns of Culture") and Sex and Temperament in Three Primitive Societies (published just after Benedict's book came out). Benedict was a senior student of Franz Boas when Mead began to study with them, and they had extensive and reciprocal influence on each other's work. Abram Kardiner was also affected by these ideas, and in time, the concept of "modal personality" was born: the cluster of traits most commonly thought to be observed in people of any given culture.

Benedict, in Patterns of Culture, expresses her belief in cultural relativism. She sought to show that each culture has its own moral imperatives that can be understood only if one studies that culture as a whole. It was wrong, she felt, to disparage the customs or values of a culture different from one's own. Those customs had a meaning to the people who lived them that should not be dismissed or trivialized. Others should not try to evaluate people by their standards alone. Morality, she argued, was relative to the values of the culture in which one operated.

As she described the Kwakiutl of the Pacific Northwest (based on the fieldwork of her mentor Boas), the Zuni Pueblo of New Mexico (among whom she had direct experience), the nations of the Great Plains, and the Dobu culture of New Guinea (regarding whom she relied upon Mead and Reo Fortune's fieldwork), she gave evidence that their values, even where they may seem strange, are intelligible in terms of their own coherent cultural systems and should be understood and respected. That also formed a central argument in her later work on the Japanese following World War II.

Critics have objected to the degree of abstraction and generalization inherent in the "culture and personality" approach. Some have argued that particular patterns that she found may be only a part or a subset of the whole cultures. For example, David Friend Aberle writes that the Pueblo people may be calm, gentle, and much given to ritual in one mood or set of circumstances, but they may be suspicious, retaliatory, and warlike in other circumstances.

=== "The Races of Mankind" ===
One of Benedict's wartime works was a pamphlet titled "The Races of Mankind," which she wrote with her colleague at the Columbia University Department of Anthropology, Gene Weltfish. The pamphlet was intended for American troops and set forth in simple language with cartoon illustrations the scientific case against racist beliefs.

"The world is shrinking," begin Benedict and Weltfish. "Thirty-four nations are now united in a common cause—victory over Axis aggression, the military destruction of fascism."

The nations united against fascism, they continue, include "the most different physical types of men."

The writers explicate, in section after section, their best evidence for human equality. They want to encourage all types of people to join and not fight among themselves. "[A]ll the peoples of the earth," they point out, "are a single family and have a common origin." We all have just so many teeth, so many molars, just so many little bones and muscles, and so we can have come from only one set of ancestors, no matter what our color, the shape of our head, the texture of our hair. "The races of mankind are what the Bible says they are—brothers. In their bodies is the record of their brotherhood."

=== The Chrysanthemum and the Sword ===
Benedict is known not only for Patterns of Culture but also for her later book The Chrysanthemum and the Sword, the study of the society and culture of Japan that she published in 1946, incorporating results of her wartime research.

This book is an instance of "anthropology at a distance." The study of a culture through its literature, newspaper clippings, films and recordings, etc. was necessary when anthropologists aided the United States and its allies during World War II. Unable to visit Nazi Germany or Japan under Hirohito, anthropologists used these cultural materials to produce studies at a distance. They attempted to understand the cultural patterns that might be driving their aggression and hoped to find possible weaknesses or means of persuasion that had been missed.

Benedict's war work included a major study, largely completed in 1944, aimed at understanding Japanese culture, which had aspects that Americans found themselves unable to comprehend. For instance, Americans considered it quite natural for American prisoners-of-war to want their families to know they were alive and to keep quiet when asked for information about troop movements, etc. However, Japanese prisoners-of-war apparently gave information freely and did not try to contact their families. Why was that? Why, too, did Asian peoples neither treat the Japanese as their liberators from Western colonialism nor accept their own supposedly-just place in a hierarchy that had Japanese at the top?

Benedict played a major role in grasping the place of the Emperor of Japan in Japanese popular culture, and formulating the recommendation to US President Franklin Roosevelt that permitting continuation of the Emperor's reign had to be part of the eventual surrender offer.

Japanese who read this work, according to Margaret Mead, found it on the whole accurate but somewhat "moralistic." Sections of the book were mentioned in Takeo Doi's book, The Anatomy of Dependence, but Doi is highly critical of Benedict's concept that Japan has a "shame" culture, whose emphasis is on how one's moral conduct appears to outsiders in contradistinction to the Christian American "guilt" culture in which the emphasis is on the individual's internal conscience. Doi considered that claim to imply clearly that the former value system is inferior to the latter one.

== Legacy ==
The American Anthropology Association awards an annual prize named after Benedict. The Ruth Benedict Prize has two categories, one for monographs by one writer and one for edited volumes. The prize recognizes "excellence in a scholarly book written from an anthropological perspective about a lesbian, gay, bisexual, or transgender topic."

A 46¢ Great Americans series postage stamp in her honor was issued on October 20, 1995.

Benedict College in Stony Brook University is named after her.

In 2005, Benedict was inducted into the National Women's Hall of Fame.

== See also ==
- Magnus Hirschfeld
- Herbert J. Seligmann
