= Ruth Landes =

American anthropologist

- Born: October 8, 1908; New York City, New York
- Died: February 11, 1991 (Aged 82); Hamilton, Ontario
- Education: Ph.D., Columbia University (1935)
- Occupation: Anthropologist

Ruth Landes (October 8, 1908 – February 11, 1991) was an American cultural anthropologist best known for studies on the Brazilian religion of Candomblé and her published study on the topic, City of Women (1947). Landes is recognized by some as a pioneer in the study of race and gender relations.

== Early life ==
Ruth Schlossberg was born in Manhattan, the daughter of Russian Jewish immigrants. Her father was Joseph Schlossberg, a cofounder and long-term secretary-general of the Amalgamated Clothing Workers of America.

== Education ==
Landes received her B.A. in sociology from New York University in 1928 and a Master's degree from The New York School of Social Work (now part of Columbia University) in 1929 before she studied for her doctorate in anthropology at Columbia University. She earned her Ph.D. in 1935 under the mentorship of Ruth Benedict, a pioneer in the field of anthropology and student of Franz Boas.

Benedict had a profound influence on Landes. She was enthralled by the way in which Benedict taught her classes and with the way she forced the students to think in an unconventional way. Landes also stated that she was never as happy studying anthropology as when she was studying with Benedict and Boas. Landes has recorded that the friendship between herself and Benedict was one of the most meaningful friendships of her life. The friendship encouraged her to expand her thinking about anthropology and question the social norms of society.

== Field studies ==
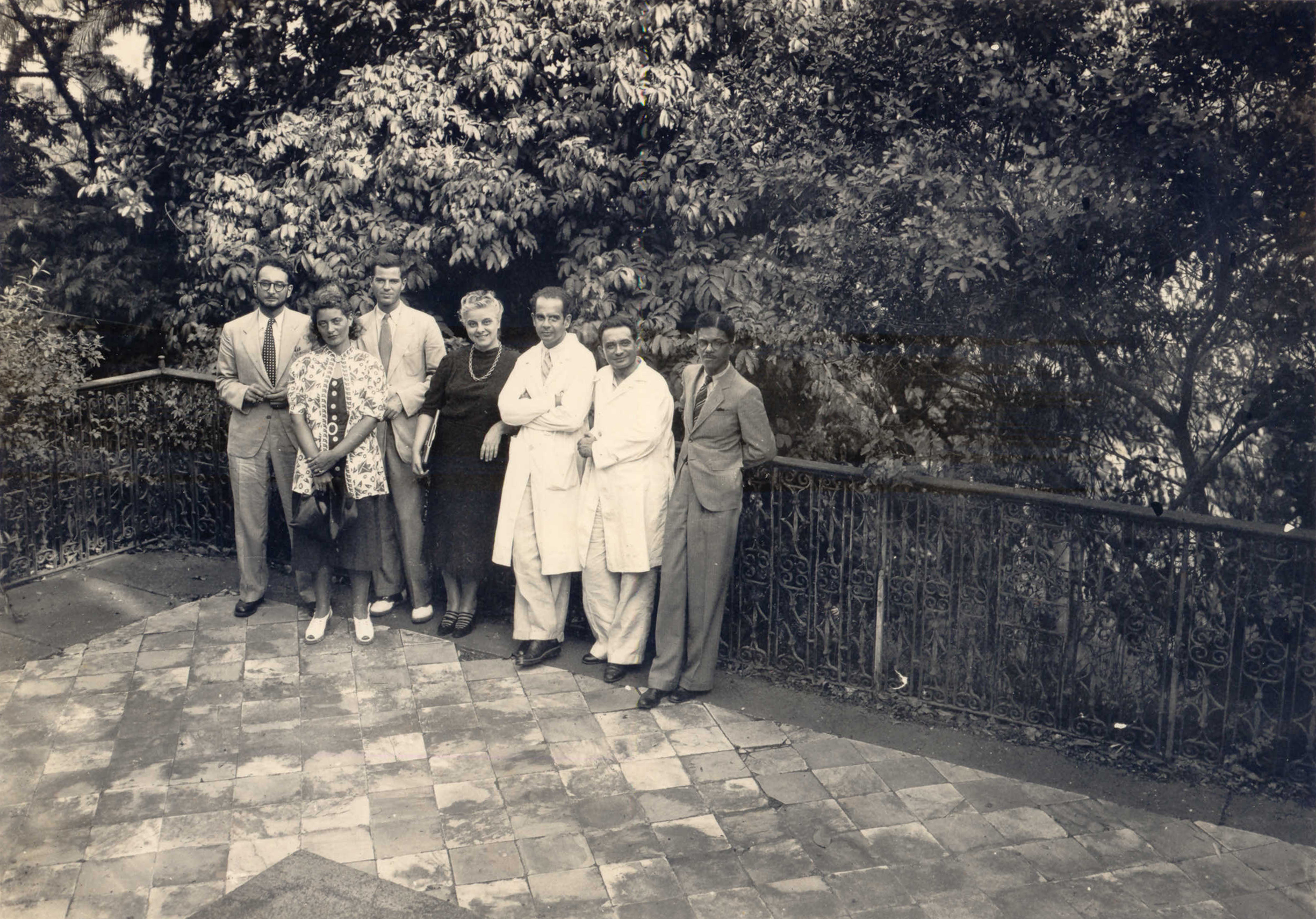
Ruth Landes with Claude Lévi-Strauss and other researchers at the Museu Nacional in Rio de Janeiro, 1930s

Landes began researching the social organization and religious practices of marginalized subjects with her masters thesis on Black Jews in Harlem. Seeking to enhance her analysis of that group, she contacted Boas, who suggested her to move to the field of anthropology.

Under Benedict's mentorship, Landes shifted her focus toward Native Americans, the more traditional anthropological subjects. Between 1932 and 1936, she undertook field work with the Ojibwa of Ontario and Minnesota, the Santee Dakota in Minnesota, and the Potawatomi in Kansas. Using her notes from those trips, Landes produced a large body of written research, including the landmark texts Ojibwa Sociology (1937), Ojibwa Woman (1938), and, much later, Ojibwa Religion and the Midewiwin (1968) and The Mystic Lake Sioux (1968). In Ojibwa Sociology and Ojibwa Woman, Landes provides notes on kinship, religious rites and social organization, and in the latter, through the tales of chief informant Maggie Wilson, reported how women navigated within gender roles to assert their economic and social autonomy. In Ojibwa Religion and The Mystic Lake Sioux, Landes discussed her subjects' strategies to maintain religious and cultural beliefs and practices while they also respond to rapid changes in their cultural and political environment.

In 1938–1939, Landes worked in Bahia, Brazil, to study religious syncretism and identity construction among Afro-Brazilian Candomblé practitioners. She wrote that the women-centered sphere of candomblé was a source of power for certain disenfranchised blacks and a creative outlet for what she called "passive homosexuals." In her published work on these findings, City of Women (1947), Landes discussed how racial politics in Brazil shape many candomblé practices. She returned to Brazil in 1966 to study the effects of urban development in Rio de Janeiro.

== Career ==
For much of her professional career, Landes held a number of contract research positions. In 1939, she became a researcher for Gunnar Myrdal's study of African-Americans. In 1941, she became research director for the Office of the Coordinator of Inter-American Affairs. In 1941 to 1945, she was the representative for African-American and Mexican-American Affairs on President Franklin D. Roosevelt's Committee on Fair Employment Practices. Meanwhile, she began to study the Acadians of Louisiana.

In 1948–1951, Landes was study director of the American Jewish Commission in New York. She was a consultant on Jewish families of New York for Ruth Benedict's Research in Contemporary Cultures in 1949 to 1951. In 1950 to 1952, Landes studied problems of immigrants of Asian and African descent in the United Kingdom. In 1946 to 1947 and again in the late 1950s and the early 1960s, Landes lived in California and, through several consultantships, became involved with the study of Hispanic/Latino culture. Meanwhile, she began cross-cultural studies on minority education and the processes and effects of aging. In 1968, she began an investigation of bilingualism and biculturalism that developed from her interest in Quebec nationalism in Canada. The project took her to Spain and Nevada to study the Basques, to Switzerland to examine the four language groups there, and to South Africa to study the interaction of Africans, English-speakers, and Afrikaans-speakers. She resumed interest in the Acadians of Louisiana in 1963.

Until 1965, Landes's institutional affiliations consisted of fairly short-term appointments. Besides those already named, she was an instructor at Brooklyn College in 1937 and at Fisk University in 1937 to 1938. She was a lecturer at the William Alanson White Psychiatric Institution in New York in 1953 to 1954 and at the New School for Social Research in New York in 1953 to 1955. She was a visiting professor at the University of Kansas in 1957 and at the University of Southern California in 1957 to 1965. From 1959 to 1962, she was visiting professor and director of the anthropology and education program at the Claremont Graduate School. She was an extension lecturer at Columbia University and at Los Angeles State College in 1963, a visiting professor at Tulane University during the early months of 1964, and a visiting professor at the University of Kansas in the summer of 1964. Her association with McMaster University in Hamilton, Ontario, began in 1965 and continued after 1977 with her appointment as professor emerita.

== Death and legacy ==
Ruth Landes died in Hamilton, Ontario, on February 11, 1991, at the age of 82. Her final place of work, McMaster University, has established The Ruth Landes Prize awarded each year to the student who has demonstrated outstanding academic achievement in anthropology. Additionally, the Ruth Landes Memorial Research Fund funds interdisciplinary scholarship on the various subjects that were of interest to her during her professional and academic career. Her professional papers, photographs, and collected artifacts from the field are archived in the National Anthropological Archives at the Smithsonian Institution, in Washington, DC.

== Bibliography ==
Selected books

- Ojibwa Sociology (1937)
- The Ojibwa Woman (1938) ISBN 0-8032-7969-8
- The City of Women (1947) ISBN 0-8263-1556-9
- Culture in American Education: Anthropological Approaches to Minority and Dominant Groups in the Schools (1965)
- Latin Americans of the Southwest (1965)
- A cidade das mulheres (1967) (Portuguese translation of The City of Women.)
- The Mystic Lake Sioux: Sociology of the Mdewakantonwan Sioux (1968)
- Ojibwa Religion and the Midewiwin (1968)
- The Prairie Potawatomi: Tradition and Ritual in the Twentieth Century (1970)
