= Japanese values =

Cultural assumptions and concepts specific to Japanese culture

Japanese values are cultural goals, beliefs and behaviors that are considered important in Japanese culture. From a global perspective, Japanese culture stands out for its higher scores in emancipative values, individualism, and flexibility compared to many other cultures around the world. There is a similar level of emphasis on these values in the cultures of the United States and Japan. However cultures from Western Europe surpass it in these aspects. Overall, Japanese society exhibits unique characteristics influenced by personal connections, consensus building, and a strong sense of community consciousness. These features have deep historical roots and reflect the values ingrained in Japanese society.

== Global perspectives ==
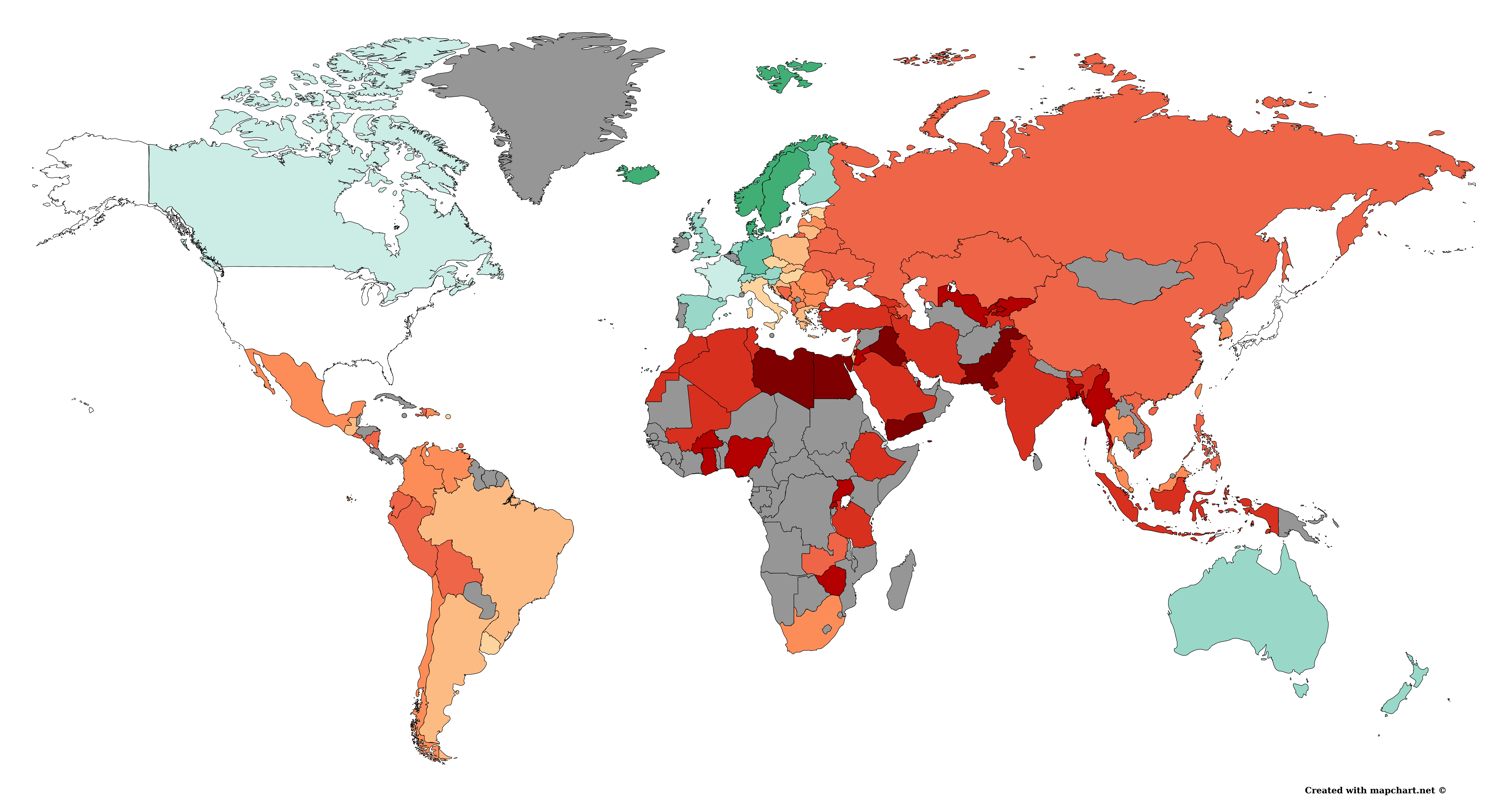
Countries colored according to the difference from Japan on the index of emancipative values.: +1.5 to +0.2 +1.0 to +1.5 +0.5 to +1.0 0 to +0.5 0 / 0 to −0.05 −0.05 to −0.1 −0.1 to −0.15 −0.15 to −0.2 −0.2 to −0.25 / −0.25 to −0.3 −0.3 to −0.35 No available data

From a global perspective, Japanese culture scores higher on emancipative values (individual freedom and equality between individuals) and individualism than most other cultures, including those from the Middle East and Northern Africa, sub-Saharan Africa, India and other South Asian countries, Central Asia, South-East Asia, Central Asia, Eastern Europe, Central America and South America.

Cultures from Western Europe score higher than Japanese culture in emancipative values and individualism. There is a similar level of emancipative values and individualism in the cultures of United States and Japan.

According to the theory of flexibility cultures and monumentalist cultures elaborated by social anthropologist Michael Minkov, certain societies emphasize adaptation to change and self-improvement (flexibility cultures) while others prioritize tradition and self-stability (monumentalist cultures). Japanese culture emphasizes flexibility more than most other cultures. Among a sample of 54 national cultures selected from all major regions of the world, Japanese culture ranked first on the flexibility index. The flexibility orientation of cultures is strongly correlated with educational achievement of students on international tests such as PISA and TIMSS.

== History of scholarship ==
The writings of late 19th through early 20th century Western travellers such as Basil Hall Chamberlain, George Trumbull Ladd and Percival Lowell influenced later ideas about Japanese values in both popular and academic discourse.

Ruth Benedict's 1946 book The Chrysanthemum and the Sword was influential in shaping subsequent portraits and stereotypes about Japanese values. In anthropology, the book popularized the distinction between guilt and shame cultures. It portrayed Japanese culture as being based on hierarchies between superiors and subordinates, as well as having an emphasis on interpersonal relationships with close others.

The research culminating in the publication of The Chrysanthemum and the Sword was done during the Second World War when the United States and Japan were on opposite sides of the conflict. This situation influenced the research methodology used, as Benedict had to rely on interviews with a relatively low number of Japanese Americans, as well as on documents from wartime Japan. Because of these methodological problems, the book has been criticised for not distinguishing culture from ideology, as well as for relying on unreliable samples.

In the 1970s Japanese psychoanalyst Takeo Doi published the book The Anatomy of Dependence, which elaborated on the honne–tatemae divide between public expression and private thoughts or feelings. In Japanese mythology, the gods display human emotions, such as love and anger.

Japanese children learn from their earliest days that human fulfillment comes from close association with others. Children learn early to recognize that they are part of an interdependent society, beginning in the family and later extending to larger groups such as neighborhood, school, playground, community, and company.

Dependence on others is a natural part of the human condition; it is viewed negatively only when the social obligations (giri) it creates are too onerous to fulfill, leading to, for example, karoshi (death from overwork) or suicide, which is a topic of great elaboration in Japanese history and culture. However, in the early part of the 21st century, school bullying has become a topic of very great concern.

== Education ==
Countries according to collectivism–individualism and monumentalism–flexibility values in child education. Japan is in the upper-right corner, tending towards individualism and flexibility.

Japanese adults are more likely to consider self-directness-related traits such as independence, individual responsibility, perseverance and imagination as being important goals in the education of children than are adults from most other cultures. On the other hand, Japanese adults are less likely to value traits such as religious faith or obedience as worthwhile goals for educating children in comparison with adults from other cultures. The degree of importance given by Japanese adults to practical values such as hard work and thrift or civic values like tolerance and altruism as part of child education is similar with that given by adults from most other cultures.

According to a global study realized by Michael Minkov and his collaborators using samples from 54 countries representing all major world regions, the advice that adults give (in the case they are parents) or would give (in the case they have no children) to their children is in accordance to the general features of the culture in which they live. Like cultural differences in values and norms related to other domains, cultural differences about child education goals form two indexes called individualism versus collectivism and flexibility versus monumentalism. Japanese adults consider individualistic traits as being more important in child education than parents from other cultures, except from Western Europe. Flexibility traits such as adaptation to changing circumstances and self-improvement were more likely to be selected as important by Japanese adults than by adults from any other culture included in the study.

Japan emphasizes independence, accountability, determination, and creativity in education. The Japanese value these traits more than other cultures when evaluating child education goals. Religious faith and obedience are less stressed in Japanese child education. Self-reliance and personal growth are stressed in Japanese education (Nemoto, 1999). Michael Minkov and colleagues found that adults' child guidance matches cultural values in 54 countries. Japanese adults value individualism and flexibility over collectivism and monumentalism in education. They value individual growth and adaptability. Western Europe and Japan value individual child education. Nemoto (1999) claims Japan values adaptability and self-improvement more than other cultures. Foreign educators say Japanese schools perform well in global math and science tests. Every Japanese child must attend elementary and middle school, regardless of family income. These schools receive large government tuition subsidies. Public elementary, middle, and high schools are cheaper than private (Nemoto, 1999).

== Community ==
=== Community and Leadership ===
Certain distinctive features of Japanese politics can be identified, although this is not to say that they are unique to Japan. Rather, qualities also found in other political systems, such as the importance of personal connections and consensus building, played an extraordinarily important role in Japanese politics. These features have deep historical roots and reflect values that pervade the society as a whole.

In both the feudal and the modern eras, a major problem for Japanese political leaders has been reconciling the goals of community survival and the welfare and self-respect of individuals in an environment of extreme scarcity. In recent centuries, Japan lacked the natural resources and space to accommodate its population comfortably. With the exception of Hokkaidō and colonial territories in Asia between 1895 and 1945, there was no "frontier" to absorb excess people. One solution was to ignore the welfare of large sectors of the population (peasants and workers) and to use force when they expressed their discontent. Such coercive measures, common during both the Tokugawa and the World War II periods, largely, although not entirely, disappeared in the postwar "welfare state" (for example, farmers were evicted from their land to construct the New Tokyo International Airport at Narita Sanrizuka in the 1970s after long negotiations had failed). But non-coercive, or mostly non-coercive, methods of securing popular compliance had developed to an extraordinary degree in social and political life.

The most important such method is the promotion of a strong sense of community consciousness and group solidarity. Japanese individuals are often characterized as having a strong sense of self-sacrifice and community dedication (see Japanese values). Historians and sociologists note that both traditional and modern Japanese communities—the buraku, the feudal domain with its retinue of samurai, the large commercial houses found in Edo (the future Tokyo), Osaka, and Kyoto before 1868, and modern corporations and bureaucracies with their cohorts of lifetime employees—have striven to be all-inclusive. Such groups serve a variety of functions for the individual, providing not only income and sustenance but also emotional support and individual identity. Japanese called such community inclusiveness the "octopus-pot way of life" (takotsubo seikatsu). Large pots with narrow openings at the top are used by fishermen to capture octopuses, and the term is used to refer to people so wrapped up in their particular social group that they cannot see the world outside its confines.

The "group consciousness" model of Japanese social life, however, has been overstressed at times. A person may often go along with group demands because they serve self-interest in the long run (for example, political contributions may help secure future favors from those in office). Historically, democratic concepts of individual rights and limited government have been deeply appealing because they, too, promise protection of individual autonomy. Despite very different ethical and political traditions, the Japanese people were very receptive to imported liberal ideas both before and after 1945. John Stuart Mill's essay On Liberty, for example, was extremely popular during the Meiji era.

Because individual, usually passive, resistance to group demands occurs, Japanese leaders have found the creation of a strong community sense to be a difficult and time-consuming task. Harmony (wa), that most prized social value, is not easily attained. One mechanism for achieving wa is the use of rituals to develop a psychological sense of group identity. Political parties and factions, the offices of national and local governments, businesses, university departments, research groups, alumni associations, and other groups sponsor frequent ceremonies and more informal parties for this purpose. A group's history and identity are carefully constructed through the use of songs and symbols (often resembling, in miniature, the Meiji government's creation of symbols of kokutai in the late nineteenth century). Often, an organization's founder, especially if deceased, is regarded as something of a Confucian sage or a Shinto kami (deity). Group members, however, may find that pervasive ritualism allows them to "go through the motions" (such as the chanting of banzai! (ten thousand years!) at the end of political rallies, without having to make a deeper commitment to the group.

A second mechanism to promote community solidarity is the building of hierarchical relationships. In this practice, the influence of premodern ethics is readily apparent. In what anthropologist Nakane Chie calls Japan's "vertical society," human relationships are defined in terms of inequality, and people relate to each other as superiors and inferiors along a minutely differentiated gradient of social status, not only within bureaucratic organizations, where it might be expected, but also in academic, artistic, and, especially, political worlds.

Hierarchy expresses itself along two dimensions: first, an internal community differentiation of rank by seniority, education, and occupational status; and second, the distinction between "insiders" and "outsiders," between members and nonmembers of the community, along with the ranking of whole groups or communities along a vertical continuum. Although internal hierarchy can cause alienation as inferiors chafe under the authority of their superiors, the external kind of hierarchy tends to strengthen group cohesion as individual members work to improve their group's relative ranking. The Japanese nation as a whole has been viewed as a single group by its people in relation to other nations. Intense nationalism has frequently been a manifestation of group members' desire to "catch up and overtake" the advanced ("superior") nations of the West, while the rights of non-Western nations, like China or Korea, often viewed as "inferior," have been ignored.

Like group consciousness, however, the theme of hierarchy has been overstressed. Contemporary Japanese politics show a strong consciousness of equality, and even traditional communities, such as rural villages, were often egalitarian rather than hierarchical. Citizens' movements of the 1960s and 1970s differed from older political organizations in their commitment to promoting intragroup democracy. In addressing the nation, Emperor Akihito used colloquial Japanese terms that stressed equality, rather than the formal, hierarchy-laden language of his predecessors.

Two mechanisms for lessening the hierarchy-generated tensions are the seniority principle and early retirement. As men or women grow older, gaining seniority within an organization, they acquire authority and higher status. The seniority principle is reinforced by the traditional reluctance to place younger persons in positions of authority over older ones. The institution of early retirement (top-ranked businesspeople and bureaucrats commonly retired at age fifty-five or sixty) helps to the keep the promotion of others smooth and predictable. The system also helps to enable talented individuals to succeed to the most responsible positions and prevents a small group of older persons (what the Japanese call "one-man leaders") from monopolizing leadership positions and imposing increasingly outmoded ideas on the organization. Elite retirees, however, often continue to wield influence as advisers and usually pursue second careers in organizations affiliated with the one from which they retired. (see Elderly people in Japan)

The circulation of elites that results from the seniority and early retirement principles ensures that everyone within the upper ranks of the hierarchy has a turn at occupying a high-status position, such as a cabinet post in the national government. This principle, in turn, enables people to reward their followers. There has been, for example, a regular turnover of LDP leaders. No individual has served as party president (and prime minister) longer than Sato Eisaku, the incumbent between 1964 and 1972. The average tenure of party presidents / prime ministers between 1964 and 1987 was slightly more than three years. Frequent cabinet reshuffling meant that the average tenure of other cabinet ministers in the same period was a little less than a year. Japan has not been beset with leaders in their seventies and eighties unwilling to give up their powerful positions.

Another mechanism reducing intragroup tensions is the strong personal, rather than legalistic or ideological, ties between superior and subordinate. These ties are typically characterized in terms of fictive familial relationships, analogous to the bonds between parents and children (the oyabun-kobun relationship). The ideal leader is viewed as a paternalistic one, with a warm and personal concern for the welfare of his followers. For followers, loyalty is both morally prescribed and emotionally sustained by the system. In the political world, oyabun-kobun relationships are pervasive despite the formal commitment to universalistic, democratic values. At the same time, younger people find such relationships less appealing than their elders. The so-called shinjinrui (new human beings), born in the affluent 1960s and 1970s, were often criticized by older Japanese for being self-absorbed, egoistic, and "cool." The younger generation is inclined to view with disdain the emotional expression of paternalistic ties, such as in the 1989 television broadcasts of former Prime Minister Tanaka Kakuei's supporters weeping profusely over his political retirement.

=== Consensus building ===
The community is often demanding, but it is also fragile, because social ties are sustained not only through legal norms and common self-interest but also through the affective patron-client relationship. Open conflict poses a danger to the survival of this sort of community, and thus policy making requires elaborate consultation and consensus building, usually involving all the parties concerned in order to maintain wa (和), the notion of harmony within a group. According to political scientist Lewis Austin, "everyone must be consulted informally, everyone must be heard, but not in such a way that the hearing of different opinions develops into opposition. The leader and his assistants `harmonize opinion'... in advance, using go-betweens to avert the confrontation of opposing forces." After a preliminary agreement among all has been reached, a formal meeting is held in which the agreed-upon policy will be proposed and adopted.

This process is called nemawashi (root trimming or binding), evoking the image of a gardener preparing a tree or shrub for transplanting, that is, a change in policy. Austin points out that a common Japanese verb meaning "to decide" (matomeru) literally means to gather or bring together. Decisions are "the sum of the contributions of all." Although consensus building is, for leaders, a time-consuming and emotionally exhausting process, it is necessary not only to promote group goals but also to respect and protect individual autonomy. In fact, the process represents reconciliation of the two. In the political system as a whole, most groups play some role in the nemawashi process. Exceptions are those groups or individuals, such as Koreans or other minority groups, who are viewed as outsiders.

Political leaders have to maintain solidarity and harmony within a single group and also secure the cooperation of different groups who are often in bitter conflict. Takotsubo seikatsu can promote destructive sectionalism. During World War II, rivalry between the Imperial Army and the Imperial Navy was so intense that it was nearly impossible to coordinate their strategic operations. In the postwar political system, prime ministers have often been unable to persuade different ministries, all self-sufficient and intensely jealous "kingdoms," to go along with reforms in such areas as trade liberalization. Observers such as journalist Karel van Wolferen, have concluded that Japan's political system is empty at the center, lacking real leadership or a locus of responsibility: "Statecraft in Japan is quite different from that in the rest of Asia, Europe, and the Americas. For centuries it has entailed the preservation of a careful balance of semiautonomous groups that share power... These semiautonomous components, each endowed with great discretionary powers, are not represented in one central ruling body." This view is probably exaggerated. Leadership in other countries, including the United States, has been paralyzed from time to time by powerful interest groups, and some policies in Japan requiring decisive leadership, such as the creation of social welfare and energy conservation policies in the 1970s and the privatization of state enterprises in the 1980s, have been reasonably successful.

== Japanese gender role expectations and attitudes ==
Japanese gender roles have changed due to history and expectations. Due to gender roles' nuance, young Japanese women's experiences reveal societal attitudes, expectations, and gender inequality (Belarmino & Roberts, 2019).

History shapes Japanese expectations. Housework was done by women, while men worked. Although changed, Confucian and patriarchal expectations still affect gender dynamics (Belarmino & Roberts, 2019).

To balance Confucian values with a modernizing economy, the "good wife, wise mother" archetype replaced them in Japanese gender roles. Before post-World War II Western influence, women were mostly homemakers and childrearing with little political or higher education (Belarmino & Roberts, 2019).

A qualitative study of college-aged Japanese women reveals their values and customs. Interviewees thought Japanese women married, raised children, and supported men. Women identified with societal femininity and beauty standards through pressure. Japanese families and society expect women to marry and have children. Women are expected to marry, have children, and take care of their homes. While some valued education and work, society valued marriage and family more. Interpreting Japanese gender norms requires historical and contemporary contexts. Japanese women face gender inequality despite progress, requiring social discourse and reforms (Belarmino & Roberts, 2019).

== See also ==
- Japanese political values
- Shame society
- Japan Unbound: A Volatile Nation's Quest for Pride and Purpose
- Korean society
- Chinese values
