= The Chrysanthemum and the Sword =

1946 book by Ruth Benedict

- First edition
- Author: Ruth Benedict
- Original title: The Chrysanthemum and the Sword: Patterns of Japanese Culture
- Language: English
- Subject: National Characteristics, Japanese
- Genre: History/Anthropology
- Publisher: Houghton Mifflin
- Publication date: 1946
- Publication place: United States
- Media type: Print (Hardcover)
- Pages: 324 pp (first edition)
- ISBN: 978-0-395-50075-0
- OCLC: 412839
- Dewey Decimal: 952 19
- LC Class: DS821 .B46 1989

The Chrysanthemum and the Sword: Patterns of Japanese Culture is a 1946 study of Japan by American anthropologist Ruth Benedict compiled from her analyses of Japanese culture during World War II for the U.S. Office of War Information. Her analyses were requested in order to understand and predict the behavior of the Japanese during the war by reference to a series of contradictions in traditional culture. The book was influential in shaping American ideas about Japanese culture during the occupation of Japan, and popularized the distinction between guilt cultures and shame cultures.

Although it has received harsh criticism, the book has continued to be influential. Two anthropologists wrote in 1992 that there is "a sense in which all of us have been writing footnotes to [Chrysanthemum] since it appeared in 1946". The Japanese, Benedict wrote, are

both aggressive and unaggressive, both militaristic and aesthetic, both insolent and polite, rigid and adaptable, submissive and resentful of being pushed around, loyal and treacherous, brave and timid, conservative and hospitable to new ways...

The book also affected Japanese conceptions of themselves. The book was translated into Japanese in 1948 and became a bestseller in the People's Republic of China when relations with Japan soured.

== Research circumstances ==
This book which resulted from Benedict's wartime research, like several other United States Office of War Information wartime studies of Japan and Germany, is an instance of "culture at a distance", the study of a culture through its literature, newspaper clippings, films, and recordings, as well as extensive interviews with German-Americans or Japanese-Americans. The techniques were necessitated by anthropologists' inability to visit Nazi Germany or wartime Japan. One later ethnographer pointed out, however, that although "culture at a distance" had the "elaborate aura of a good academic fad, the method was not so different from what any good historian does: to make the most creative use possible of written documents." Anthropologists were attempting to understand the cultural patterns that might be driving the aggression of once-friendly nations, and they hoped to find possible weaknesses or means of persuasion that had been missed.

Americans found themselves unable to comprehend matters in Japanese culture. For instance, Americans considered it quite natural that American prisoners of war would want their families to know that they were alive and that they would keep quiet when they were asked for information about troop movements, etc. However, Japanese prisoners of war apparently gave information freely and did not try to contact their families.

== Reception in the United States ==
Between 1946 and 1971, the book sold only 28,000 hardback copies, and a paperback edition was not issued until 1967. Benedict played a major role in grasping the place of the Emperor of Japan in Japanese popular culture, and formulating the recommendation to President Franklin D. Roosevelt that permitting continuation of the Emperor's reign had to be part of the eventual surrender offer.

As of 1999, 350,000 copies were sold in the US.

== Reception in Japan ==
More than 2.3 million copies of the book have been sold in Japan since it first appeared in translation there.

John W. Bennett and Michio Nagai, two scholars on Japan, pointed out in 1953 that the translated book "has appeared in Japan during a period of intense national self-examination—a period during which Japanese intellectuals and writers have been studying the sources and meaning of Japanese history and character, in one of their perennial attempts to determine the most desirable course of Japanese development."

Japanese social critic and philosopher Tamotsu Aoki said that the translated book "helped invent a new tradition for postwar Japan." It helped to create a growing interest in "ethnic nationalism" in the country, shown in the publication of hundreds of ethnocentric nihonjinron (treatises on 'Japaneseness') published over the next four decades. Although Benedict was criticized for not discriminating among historical developments in the country in her study, "Japanese cultural critics were especially interested in her attempts to portray the whole or total structure ('zentai kōzō') of Japanese Culture," as Helen Hardacre put it. C. Douglas Lummis has said the entire "nihonjinron" genre stems ultimately from Benedict's book.

The book began a discussion among Japanese scholars about "shame culture" vs. "guilt culture", which spread beyond academia, and the two terms are now established as ordinary expressions in the country.

Soon after the translation was published, Japanese scholars, including Kazuko Tsurumi, Tetsuro Watsuji, and Kunio Yanagita criticized the book as inaccurate and having methodological errors. American scholar C. Douglas Lummis has written that criticisms of Benedict's book that are "now very well known in Japanese scholarly circles" include that it represented the ideology of a class for that of the entire culture, "a state of acute social dislocation for a normal condition, and an extraordinary moment in a nation's history as an unvarying norm of social behavior."

Japanese ambassador to Pakistan Sadaaki Numata said the book "has been a must reading for many students of Japanese studies."

According to Margaret Mead, the author's former student and a fellow anthropologist, other Japanese who have read it found it on the whole accurate but somewhat "moralistic". Sections of the book were mentioned favorably in Takeo Doi's book, The Anatomy of Dependence, but he is somewhat critical of her analysis of Japan and the West as respectively shame and guilt cultures, noting that while he is "disposed to side with her," she still "allows value judgements to creep into her ideas."

In a 2002 symposium at The Library of Congress in the United States, Shinji Yamashita, of the department of anthropology at the University of Tokyo, added that there has been so much change since World War II in Japan that Benedict would not recognize the nation she described in 1946.

Lummis wrote, "After some time I realized that I would never be able to live in a decent relationship with the people of that country unless I could drive this book, and its politely arrogant world view, out of my head." Lummis, who went to the Vassar College archives to review Benedict's notes, wrote that he found some of her more important points were developed from interviews with Robert Hashima, a Japanese-American native of the United States who was taken to Japan as a child, educated there, then returned to the US before World War II began. According to Lummis, who interviewed Hashima, the circumstances helped introduce a certain bias into Benedict's research: "For him, coming to Japan for the first time as a teenager smack in the middle of the militaristic period and having no memory of the country before then, what he was taught in school was not 'an ideology', it was Japan itself." Lummis thinks Benedict relied too much on Hashima and says that he was deeply alienated by his experiences in Japan and that "it seems that he became a kind of touchstone, the authority against which she would test information from other sources."

== Reception in China ==
The first Chinese translation was made by Taiwanese anthropologist Huang Dao-Ling, and published in Taiwan in April 1974 by Taiwan Kui-Kuang Press. The book became a bestseller in China in 2005, when relations with the Japanese government were strained. In that year alone, 70,000 copies of the book were sold in China.

== See also ==
- Bushidō
- Honne and tatemae
