= Benjamin Franklin effect =

Proposed psychological phenomenon

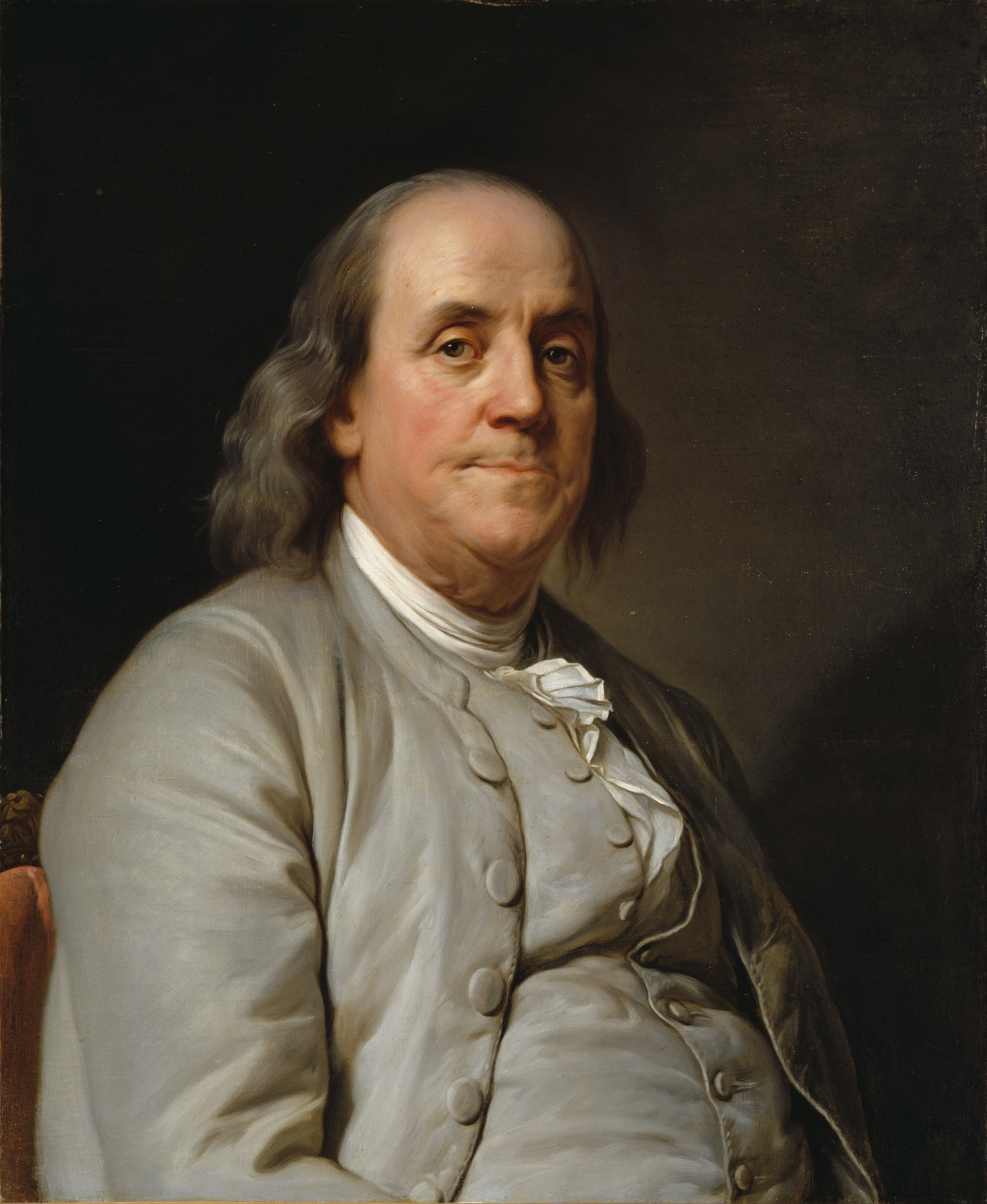
The eponym of the effect, Benjamin Franklin

The Benjamin Franklin Effect or Ben Franklin Effect is an effect in which a person likes someone more after doing them a favor. The effect can be explained with cognitive dissonance: individuals rationalize their helpful actions by assuming they must like the person, since their behavior would otherwise conflict with their typical behavior and self-perception. In this way, the effect shows how people adjust their attitudes to maintain consistency in their self-concept.

== Franklin's observation of effect ==
Benjamin Franklin, after whom the effect is named, quoted what he described as an "old maxim" in his autobiography: "He that has once done you a kindness will be more ready to do you another, than he whom you yourself have obliged."

Franklin explains how he dealt with the animosity of a rival legislator when he served as a member of the Pennsylvania Provincial Assembly in the 18th century:

Having heard that he had in his library a certain very scarce and curious book, I wrote a note to him, expressing my desire of perusing that book, and requesting he would do me the favour of lending it to me for a few days. He sent it immediately, and I return'd it in about a week with another note, expressing strongly my sense of the favour. When we next met in the House, he spoke to me (which he had never done before), and with great civility; and he ever after manifested a readiness to serve me on all occasions, so that we became great friends, and our friendship continued to his death.

== Research ==
A study of the effect was done by Jon Jecker and David Landy in 1969, in which students were invited to take part in a question and answer competition conducted by a researcher in which participants could be awarded sums of money. After this competition was over, one-third of the students who had "won" were approached by the researcher, who asked them to return the money on the grounds that he had used his own funds to pay the winners and was running short of money now; another third were asked by a secretary to return the money because it was from the psychology department and funds were low; another third were not at all approached. All three groups were then asked how much they liked the researcher. The second group liked him the least, the first group the most – suggesting that a refund request by an intermediary had decreased their liking, while a direct request had increased their liking.

In 1971, University of North Carolina psychologists John Schopler and John Compere conducted the following experiment:

They had their subjects administer learning tests to accomplices pretending to be other students. The subjects were told the learners would watch as the teachers used sticks to tap out long patterns on a series of wooden cubes. The learners would then be asked to repeat the patterns. Each teacher was to try out two different methods on two different people, one at a time. In one run, the teachers would offer encouragement when the learner got the patterns correct. In the other run of the experiment, the teacher insulted and criticized the learner when they erred. Afterward, the teachers filled out a debriefing questionnaire that included questions about how attractive (as a human being, not romantically) and likable the learners were. Across the board, the subjects who received the insults were rated as less attractive than the ones who got encouragement.

The subjects' own conduct toward the accomplices shaped their perception of them – "You tend to like the people to whom you are kind and dislike the people to whom you are rude."

Results were reproduced in a more recent but smaller study by psychologist Yu Niiya with both Japanese and American subjects.

== Effect as an example of cognitive dissonance ==
This perception of Franklin has been cited as an example within cognitive dissonance theory, which says that people change their attitudes or behavior to resolve tensions, or "dissonance", between their thoughts, attitudes, and actions. In the case of the Benjamin Franklin Effect, the dissonance is between the subject's negative attitudes to the other person and the knowledge that they did that person a favor.

== Alternative explanations ==
Psychologist Yu Niiya attributes the phenomenon to the requestee reciprocating a perceived attempt by the requester to ignite friendly relations. This theory would explain the Benjamin Franklin Effect's absence when an intermediary is used.

== Uses ==
In the sales field, the Benjamin Franklin Effect can be used to build rapport with a client. Instead of offering to help the potential client, a salesperson can instead ask the potential client for assistance: "For example, ask them to share with you what product benefits they find most compelling, where they think the market is headed, or what products may be of interest several years from now. This pure favor, left unrepaid, can build likability that will enhance your ability to earn that client's time and investment in the future."

The Benjamin Franklin effect can also be observed in successful mentor-protege relationships. Such relationships, one source points out, "are defined by their fundamental imbalance of knowledge and influence. Attempting to proactively reciprocate favors with a mentor can backfire, as the role reversal and unsolicited assistance may put your mentor in an unexpected, awkward situation". The Benjamin Franklin Effect was cited in Dale Carnegie's bestselling book How to Win Friends and Influence People. Carnegie interprets the request for a favor as "a subtle but effective form of flattery".

As Carnegie suggests:

...when we ask a colleague to do us a favour, we are signalling that we consider them to have something we don't, whether more intelligence, more knowledge, more skills, or whatever. This is another way of showing admiration and respect, something the other person may not have noticed from us before. This immediately raises their opinion of us and makes them more willing to help us again both because they enjoy the admiration and have genuinely started to like us.

Psychologist Yu Niiya suggests that the Benjamin Franklin Effect vindicates Takeo Doi's theory of amae (甘え), as described in The Anatomy of Dependence. It states that dependent, childlike behavior can induce a parent-child bond where one partner sees themselves as the caretaker. In effect, amae creates a relationship where one person feels responsible for the other, who is then free to act immaturely and make demands.

One commentator has discussed the Benjamin Franklin Effect in connection with dog training, thinking "more about the human side of the relationship rather than about the dogs themselves." While trainers often distinguish between the impact of positive and negative reinforcement-based training methods on the dogs, it can also be relevant to "consider the effects that these two approaches may have upon the trainer. The Benjamin Franklin Effect suggests that how we treat our dogs during training influences how we think about them as individuals – specifically, how much we like (or dislike) them. When we do nice things for our dogs in the form of treats, praise, petting and play to reinforce desired behaviors, such treatment may result in our liking them more. In comparison, if we use harsh words, collar jerks or hitting in an attempt to change our dog's behavior, then...we will start to like our dog less."

== Converse ==
The opposite case is also believed to be true, namely that we come to hate or dislike a person to whom we did wrong. We de-humanize them to justify the bad things we did to them.

It has been suggested that if soldiers who have killed enemy servicemen in combat situations later come to hate them, it is because this psychological maneuver helps to "decrease the dissonance of killing". Such a phenomenon might also "explain long-standing grudges like Hatfield vs. McCoy" or vendetta situations in various cultures: "Once we start, we may not be able to stop and engage in behavior we would normally never allow." As one commentator has put it, "Jailers come to look down on inmates; camp guards come to dehumanize their captives; soldiers create derogatory terms for their enemies. It's difficult to hurt someone you admire. It's even more difficult to kill a fellow human being. Seeing the casualties you create as something less than you, something deserving of damage, makes it possible to continue seeing yourself as a good and honest person, to continue being sane."

== See also ==
- Foot-in-the-door technique
- Icebreaker (facilitation)
- Reciprocity (social psychology)
- Sunk-cost fallacy
- Social proof
