= Japanese political values =

Traditional Japanese political values are commonly characterized by a strong community sense and group solidarity and the importance of personal connections and consensus building.

== Clichés and their critique ==
Concerning values, Japanese politics are generally described as pragmatic, limited by particularistic loyalties, and based on human relations rather than on ideology or principles. The quintessential Japanese leader is a network builder rather than the embodiment of charisma or ideals; more like the crafty and resourceful founder of the Tokugawa bakufu, Tokugawa Ieyasu, than the ruthless but heroic Oda Nobunaga. Such political dynamics are evident, for example, in the workings of the LDP, which has remained the strongest party since 1955 despite their 3-year loss of majority control in the early 1990s.

The pragmatic, personalistic view of politics cannot explain Japan's militaristic past, the political crises of the 1960s, the controversies surrounding the emperor, Article 9, or the unwillingness of many in the Social Democratic Party of Japan, despite a huge political cost, to abandon their antiwar and revolutionary commitment in the early 1990s.

It also fails to account for the apparently sincerely held ideological beliefs of the wartime period. The "New Order in Greater East Asia" was legitimized on the basis of universal principles, such as "Pan-Asianism," "international justice," and "permanent peace," even if the results were quite the opposite. The non-ideological nature of mainstream Japanese politics in the postwar period reflects defeat in war, the failure after 1945 to find a national ideological consensus to replace discredited wartime beliefs, and the commitment of both elite and ordinary Japanese to expanding the economy and raising living standards. As these goals were attained, a complacent, largely apolitical "middle mass society" (a term coined by economist Murakami Yasusuke) emerged, in which 90 percent of the people in opinion polls consistently classified themselves as "middle class."

== Community and leadership ==
Certain distinctive features of Japanese politics can be identified, although this is not to say that they are unique to Japan. Rather, qualities also found in other political systems, such as the importance of personal connections and consensus building, played an extraordinarily important role in Japanese politics. These features have deep historical roots and reflect values that pervade the society as a whole.

In both the feudal and the modern eras, a major problem for Japanese political leaders has been reconciling the goals of community survival and the welfare and self-respect of individuals in an environment of extreme scarcity. In recent centuries, Japan lacked the natural resources and space to accommodate its population comfortably. With the exception of Hokkaidō and colonial territories in Asia between 1895 and 1945, there was no "frontier" to absorb excess people. One solution was to ignore the welfare of large sectors of the population (peasants and workers) and to use force when they expressed their discontent. Such coercive measures, common during both the Tokugawa and the World War II periods, largely, although not entirely, disappeared in the postwar "welfare state" (for example, farmers were evicted from their land to construct the New Tokyo International Airport at Narita Sanrizuka in the 1970s after long negotiations had failed). But non-coercive, or mostly non-coercive, methods of securing popular compliance had developed to an extraordinary degree in social and political life.

The most important such method is the promotion of a strong sense of community consciousness and group solidarity. Japanese individuals are often characterized as having a strong sense of self-sacrifice and community dedication (see Japanese values). Historians and sociologists note that both traditional and modern Japanese communities—the buraku, the feudal domain with its retinue of samurai, the large commercial houses found in Edo (the future Tokyo), Osaka, and Kyoto before 1868, and modern corporations and bureaucracies with their cohorts of lifetime employees—have striven to be all-inclusive. Such groups serve a variety of functions for the individual, providing not only income and sustenance but also emotional support and individual identity. Japanese called such community inclusiveness the "octopus-pot way of life" (takotsubo seikatsu). Large pots with narrow openings at the top are used by fishermen to capture octopuses, and the term is used to refer to people so wrapped up in their particular social group that they cannot see the world outside its confines.

The "group consciousness" model of Japanese social life, however, has been overstressed at times. A person may often go along with group demands because they serve self-interest in the long run (for example, political contributions may help secure future favors from those in office). Historically, democratic concepts of individual rights and limited government have been deeply appealing because they, too, promise protection of individual autonomy. Despite very different ethical and political traditions, the Japanese people were very receptive to imported liberal ideas both before and after 1945. John Stuart Mill's essay On Liberty, for example, was extremely popular during the Meiji era.

Because individual, usually passive, resistance to group demands occurs, Japanese leaders have found the creation of a strong community sense to be a difficult and time-consuming task. Harmony (wa), that most prized social value, is not easily attained. One mechanism for achieving wa is the use of rituals to develop a psychological sense of group identity. Political parties and factions, the offices of national and local governments, businesses, university departments, research groups, alumni associations, and other groups sponsor frequent ceremonies and more informal parties for this purpose. A group's history and identity are carefully constructed through the use of songs and symbols (often resembling, in miniature, the Meiji government's creation of symbols of kokutai in the late nineteenth century). Often, an organization's founder, especially if deceased, is regarded as something of a Confucian sage or a Shinto kami (deity). Group members, however, may find that pervasive ritualism allows them to "go through the motions" (such as the chanting of banzai! (ten thousand years!) at the end of political rallies, without having to make a deeper commitment to the group.

A second mechanism to promote community solidarity is the building of hierarchical relationships. In this practice, the influence of premodern ethics is readily apparent. In what anthropologist Nakane Chie calls Japan's "vertical society," human relationships are defined in terms of inequality, and people relate to each other as superiors and inferiors along a minutely differentiated gradient of social status, not only within bureaucratic organizations, where it might be expected, but also in academic, artistic, and, especially, political worlds.

Hierarchy expresses itself along two dimensions: first, an internal community differentiation of rank by seniority, education, and occupational status; and second, the distinction between "insiders" and "outsiders," between members and nonmembers of the community, along with the ranking of whole groups or communities along a vertical continuum. Although internal hierarchy can cause alienation as inferiors chafe under the authority of their superiors, the external kind of hierarchy tends to strengthen group cohesion as individual members work to improve their group's relative ranking. The Japanese nation as a whole has been viewed as a single group by its people in relation to other nations. Intense nationalism has frequently been a manifestation of group members' desire to "catch up and overtake" the advanced ("superior") nations of the West, while the rights of non-Western nations, like China or Korea, often viewed as "inferior," have been ignored.

Like group consciousness, however, the theme of hierarchy has been overstressed. Contemporary Japanese politics show a strong consciousness of equality, and even traditional communities, such as rural villages, were often egalitarian rather than hierarchical. Citizens' movements of the 1960s and 1970s differed from older political organizations in their commitment to promoting intragroup democracy. In addressing the nation, Emperor Akihito used colloquial Japanese terms that stressed equality, rather than the formal, hierarchy-laden language of his predecessors.

Two mechanisms for lessening the hierarchy-generated tensions are the seniority principle and early retirement. As men or women grow older, gaining seniority within an organization, they acquire authority and higher status. The seniority principle is reinforced by the traditional reluctance to place younger persons in positions of authority over older ones. The institution of early retirement (top-ranked businesspeople and bureaucrats commonly retired at age fifty-five or sixty) helps to the keep the promotion of others smooth and predictable. The system also helps to enable talented individuals to succeed to the most responsible positions and prevents a small group of older persons (what the Japanese call "one-man leaders") from monopolizing leadership positions and imposing increasingly outmoded ideas on the organization. Elite retirees, however, often continue to wield influence as advisers and usually pursue second careers in organizations affiliated with the one from which they retired. (see Elderly people in Japan)

The circulation of elites that results from the seniority and early retirement principles ensures that everyone within the upper ranks of the hierarchy has a turn at occupying a high-status position, such as a cabinet post in the national government. This principle, in turn, enables people to reward their followers. There has been, for example, a regular turnover of LDP leaders. No individual has served as party president (and prime minister) longer than Sato Eisaku, the incumbent between 1964 and 1972. The average tenure of party presidents / prime ministers between 1964 and 1987 was slightly more than three years. Frequent cabinet reshuffling meant that the average tenure of other cabinet ministers in the same period was a little less than a year. Japan has not been beset with leaders in their seventies and eighties unwilling to give up their powerful positions.

Another mechanism reducing intragroup tensions is the strong personal, rather than legalistic or ideological, ties between superior and subordinate. These ties are typically characterized in terms of fictive familial relationships, analogous to the bonds between parents and children (the oyabun-kobun relationship). The ideal leader is viewed as a paternalistic one, with a warm and personal concern for the welfare of his followers. For followers, loyalty is both morally prescribed and emotionally sustained by the system. In the political world, oyabun-kobun relationships are pervasive despite the formal commitment to universalistic, democratic values. At the same time, younger people find such relationships less appealing than their elders. The so-called shinjinrui (new human beings), born in the affluent 1960s and 1970s, were often criticized by older Japanese for being self-absorbed, egoistic, and "cool." The younger generation is inclined to view with disdain the emotional expression of paternalistic ties, such as in the 1989 television broadcasts of former Prime Minister Tanaka Kakuei's supporters weeping profusely over his political retirement.

== Consensus building ==
The community is often demanding, but it is also fragile, because social ties are sustained not only through legal norms and common self-interest but also through the affective patron-client relationship. Open conflict poses a danger to the survival of this sort of community, and thus policy making requires elaborate consultation and consensus building, usually involving all the parties concerned in order to maintain wa (和), the notion of harmony within a group. According to political scientist Lewis Austin, "everyone must be consulted informally, everyone must be heard, but not in such a way that the hearing of different opinions develops into opposition. The leader and his assistants `harmonize opinion'... in advance, using go-betweens to avert the confrontation of opposing forces." After a preliminary agreement among all has been reached, a formal meeting is held in which the agreed-upon policy will be proposed and adopted.

This process is called nemawashi (root trimming or binding), evoking the image of a gardener preparing a tree or shrub for transplanting, that is, a change in policy. Austin points out that a common Japanese verb meaning "to decide" (matomeru) literally means to gather or bring together. Decisions are "the sum of the contributions of all." Although consensus building is, for leaders, a time-consuming and emotionally exhausting process, it is necessary not only to promote group goals but also to respect and protect individual autonomy. In fact, the process represents reconciliation of the two. In the political system as a whole, most groups play some role in the nemawashi process. Exceptions are those groups or individuals, such as Koreans or other minority groups, who are viewed as outsiders.

Political leaders have to maintain solidarity and harmony within a single group and also secure the cooperation of different groups who are often in bitter conflict. Takotsubo seikatsu can promote destructive sectionalism. During World War II, rivalry between the Imperial Army and the Imperial Navy was so intense that it was nearly impossible to coordinate their strategic operations. In the postwar political system, prime ministers have often been unable to persuade different ministries, all self-sufficient and intensely jealous "kingdoms," to go along with reforms in such areas as trade liberalization. Observers such as journalist Karel van Wolferen, have concluded that Japan's political system is empty at the center, lacking real leadership or a locus of responsibility: "Statecraft in Japan is quite different from that in the rest of Asia, Europe, and the Americas. For centuries it has entailed the preservation of a careful balance of semiautonomous groups that share power... These semiautonomous components, each endowed with great discretionary powers, are not represented in one central ruling body." This view is probably exaggerated. Leadership in other countries, including the United States, has been paralyzed from time to time by powerful interest groups, and some policies in Japan requiring decisive leadership, such as the creation of social welfare and energy conservation policies in the 1970s and the privatization of state enterprises in the 1980s, have been reasonably successful.

== Culture as Ideology ==
Japanese culture's influence on political values is paramount to the explanation of Japanese values in contemporary Japan, as the Japanese culture functions more of an ideological base that can be seen to embody Japanese Political values, through cultural and social norms. For most Japanese, the idea to submerge their individuality to fully commit themselves to a company or organisation is natural. This reflects in Japanese political values through the sense of loyalty most Japanese people have in life.

Furthermore, the sense in which the individuality of Japanese cultures has been ingrained in to Japan's political physique is self evident in contemporary Japanese politics. This can be seen in explanations for why policy Japan has not always followed the western model, due to 'cultural reasons' such as social harmony and other disciplines of Japanese culture preventing such.

== See also ==
- Japanese values
