= Nebria kurosawai =

Scientific classification
- Domain: Eukaryota
- Kingdom: Animalia
- Phylum: Arthropoda
- Class: Insecta
- Order: Coleoptera
- Suborder: Adephaga
- Family: Carabidae
- Genus: Nebria
- Species: N. kurosawai

Binomial name
- Nebria kurosawai Nakane, 1960

Species of beetle

Nebria kurosawai is a species of ground beetle in the Nebriinae subfamily that is endemic to Japan.
