= Douglas Lummis =

C. Douglas Lummis is a writer, former professor at Tsuda College in Tokyo and former U.S. Marine.

== Life ==
Lummis was born in 1936 in San Francisco. He attended UC Berkeley on a Navy ROTC contract, and later did three years active duty in the Marines - the last year in Okinawa. He retired from teaching at Tsuda College in 2000.

Lummis' writings - many of which concern Japan's relationship to the United States - are extremely critical of US foreign policy. His works include the books Radical Democracy, A New Look at The Chrysanthemum and the Sword and Japan's Radical Constitution. He has also published numerous pieces in journals such as The Nation and Japan Focus.

== Critical reception ==
Susan Sontag has called Lummis "one of the most thoughtful, honorable, and relevant intellectuals writing about democratic practice anywhere in the world," while Karel van Wolferen has referred to him as an "eminent observer of the American-Japanese vassalage relationship."

Lummis' ideas have been criticized by Francis Fukuyama and others in Foreign Affairs and other journals.

== Bibliography ==
- Charles Douglas Lummis. War is hell: studies in the right of legitimate violence. Lanham, Maryland: Rowman & Littlefield, 2023.
- Charles Douglas Lummis, Sang-jung Kang, and Toshihito Kayano. Kokka to Aidentiti wo Tou [An Inquiry into the State and Identity] (in Japanese). Iwanami Shoten, 2009.
- Charles Douglas Lummis. Radical Democracy. Ithaca: Cornell University Press, 1997. ISBN 978-0-8014-8451-3
- Charles Douglas Lummis. Peace and democracy in postwar Japan: dreams and realities. Tokyo: Kirihara Shoten, 1985.
- Charles Douglas Lummis. A new look at the Chrysanthemum and the sword. Tokyo: Shohakusha, 1982.
