= Nihonjinron =

Literary genre on Japanese identity

Nihonjinron (日本人論: treatises on Japaneseness) is a genre of ethnocentric nationalist literary work that focuses on issues of Japanese national and cultural identity. Nihonjinron posits concepts such as Japanese being a "unique isolate, having no known affinities with any other race", and has been described as racist.

Nihonjinron literature flourished during a publishing boom after World War II with books and articles aiming to analyze, explain, or explore Japanese culture and cultural mindset.

== History ==
Hiroshi Minami traces the origin of nihonjinron to before the Edo period.

The roots of the nihonjinron can be traced back at least to the kokugaku ("native studies") movement of the 18th century, with themes that are not dissimilar to those in the post-war nihonjinron.

=== Kokugaku ===
Kokugaku, beginning as a scholarly investigation into the philology of Japan's early classical literature, sought to recover and evaluate these texts, some of which were obscure and difficult to read, in order to appraise them positively and harvest them to determine and ascertain what were the original indigenous values of Japan before the introduction of Chinese civilization. Thus the exploration of early classical texts like the Kojiki and the Man'yōshū allowed scholars of Kokugaku, particularly the five great figures of Keichū (1640–1701), Kada no Azumamaro (1669–1736), Kamo no Mabuchi (1697–1769), Motoori Norinaga (1730–1801) and Hirata Atsutane (1776–1843) to explore Japan's cultural differences with China, locate their sources in high antiquity, and deploy the results in a programmatic attempt to define the uniqueness of Japan against a foreign civilization. These scholars worked independently, and reached different conclusions, but by the 19th century were grouped together by a neo-Kokugakuist named Konakamura to establish the earliness of Japanese self-awareness. Chinese cultural beliefs, social rites and philosophical ideas exercised a political ascendancy for over a millennium within Japan, and informed the neo-Confucian ideology of the Tokugawa regime.

=== Meiji period ===
In the second half of the 19th century, under strong military and diplomatic pressure, and suffering from an internal crisis that led to the collapse of the Bakufu, Japan opened its ports, and subsequently the nation, to commerce with the outside world and reform that sought to respond vigorously to the challenges of modern industrial polities, as they were remarked on by Japanese observers in the United States and Europe. The preponderant place of China as model and cultural adversary in the cognitive models developed hitherto was occupied by the West. But, whereas Japan's traditional engagement with Chinese civilization was conducted in terms of a unilateral debate, now Japanese scholars and thinkers could read directly what Westerners, themselves fascinated by the 'exoticism' of Japanese culture, said and wrote of them. Japanese contact with, and responses to these emerging Western stereotypes, which reflected the superiority complex, condescension and imperial hauteur of the times, fed into Japanese debates on national identity. As Leslie Pincus puts it, speaking of a later phase:

one might say that Japanese travelers reappropriated Japan from Europe as an exoticized object. Just as ukiyo-e were first reimported back into Japan from Paris museums and private European collections after World War 1, less tangible aspects of the cultural past were newly rediscovered by Japanese visitors in Europe. But whether material or ethereal, the artifacts of Japanese culture had become indelibly inflected by Europe's fascination with, or depreciation of, one of its cultural others.

There ensued an intense period of massive social and economic change, as, under the direction of a developmental elite, Japan moved from the closed world of centuries of Tokugawa rule (the so-called sakoku period) to Meiji Westernization, and, again in close conformity with the prevailing occidental paradigm, to imperialist adventurism with the growth of the colonialism. The Taishō period marked a slightly more 'liberal' turn, as the pendulum swung towards a renewed interest in the Western model ("Japan must undergo a second birth, with America as its new mother and France as its father"). With the crisis of 1929 and the concomitant depression of the 1930s, militarism gained the upper hand in this era of the 'dark valley' (暗い谷間, kurai tanima), and nationalistic ideologies prevailed over all attempts to keep alive the moderate traditions of liberal modernity.

=== Postwar period ===
Total economic, military and spiritual mobilization could not stave off defeat however, and slowly, under occupation, and then rapidly with its reasserted independence, Japan enjoyed a decades-long resurgence as global industrial and economic powerhouse until the crisis of the 1990s. The cultural patterns over this century long trajectory is one of a continuous oscillation between models of pronounced Westernization and traditionalist autarky. Between the two alternatives, attempts were frequently made to mediate a conciliatory third way which would combine the best of both worlds: "Japanese spirit and Western techniques" (和魂洋才, wakon yōsai).

The frequency of these chronic transitional upheavals engendered a remarkable intensity of debate about national directions and identity (国民性 kokuminsei; 民族性 minzokusei), whose complexity over time renders a synthetic judgment or bird's-eye view of the literature in question rather difficult. A major controversy surrounds the question regarding the affiliation of the post-war nihonjinron theories with the prewar conceptualization of Japanese cultural uniqueness. To what degree, that is, are these meditations under democracy on Japanese uniqueness innocent reflections of a popular search for identity, and in what measure, if any, do they pick up from the instrumental ideology of Japaneseness developed by the government and nationalists in the prewar period to harness the energies of the nation towards industrialization and global imperium?

The questions are rendered more complex by the fact that in the early post-war period, the restoration of a 'healthy nationalism' was by no means something exclusive to right-wing cultural thinkers. An intense debate over the necessity to develop ideal, positive forms of national consciousness, regarded as a healthy civic identity, figures prominently in the early writings of Maruyama Masao, who called for a healthy "national civic consciousness" (国民主義, kokuminshugi), and in the prolific debates of members of the Japanese Historical Science Association (歴研, rekiken) who preferred to speak of "ethnic national consciousness" (民族主義, minzokushugi). These debates ranged from liberal center-left critics to radical Marxist historians.

Some scholars cite the destruction of many Japanese national symbols and the psychological blow of defeat at the end of World War II as one source of nihonjinron's enduring popularity, although it is not a uniquely 20th century phenomenon. In fact the genre is simply the Japanese reflex of cultural nationalism, which is a property of all modern nations. The trend of the tone of nihonjinron argument is often reflective of the Japanese society at the time. Dale, defines three phases in the development of post-war nihonjinron discourse in the period covered by Nomura: Tamotsu Aoki subsequently finessed the pattern by distinguishing four major phases in the post war identity discourse.

During the early post-war period, most of nihonjinron discourses discussed the uniqueness of the Japanese in a rather negative, critical light. The elements of feudalism reminiscent of the Imperial Japan were all castigated as major obstacles to Japan's reestablishment as a new democratic nation. Scholars such as Hisao Ōtsuka, a Weberian sociologist, judged Japan with the measure of rational individualism and liberal democracy that were considered ideals in the U.S. and Western European nations back then. By the 1970s, however, with Japan enjoying a remarkable economic boom, Ōtsuka began to consider the 'feudal residues' in a positive light, as a badge of Japan's distinctive difference from the West (Ōtsuka, Kawashima, Doi 1976 passim). Nihonjinron books written during the period of high economic growth up to the bubble burst in the early 1990s, in contrast, argued various unique features of the Japanese as more positive features.

==== As cultural nationalism ====
Scholars such as Peter N. Dale (1986), Harumi Befu (1987), and Kosaku Yoshino (1992) view nihonjinron more critically, identifying it as a tool for enforcing social and political conformity. Dale, for example, characterizes nihonjinron as follows:

First, they implicitly assume that the Japanese constitute a culturally and socially homogeneous racial entity, whose essence is virtually unchanged from prehistoric times down to the present day. Secondly, they presuppose that the Japanese differ radically from all other known peoples. Thirdly, they are conspicuously nationalistic, displaying a conceptual and procedural hostility to any mode of analysis which might be seen to derive from external, non-Japanese sources. In a general sense then, nihonjinron may be defined as works of cultural nationalism concerned with ostensible 'uniqueness' of Japan in any aspect, and which are hostile to both individual experience and the notion of internal socio-historical diversity.

The emphasis on ingroup unity in nihonjinron writings, and its popularization during Japan's period of military expansion at the turn of the 20th century, has led some Western critics to brand it a form of ethnocentric nationalism. Karel van Wolferen echoes this assessment, observing a collectivism prevalent in the society.

==== Specific theses ====
1. The Japanese race is a unique isolate, having no known affinities with any other race. In some extreme versions, the race is claimed to be directly descended from a distinct branch of primates.
2. This isolation is due to the peculiar circumstances of living in an island country (島国, shimaguni) cut off from the promiscuous cross-currents of continental history, with its endless miscegenation of tribes and cultures. The island country in turn enjoys a unique climate (風土, fūdo) whose peculiar rhythms, the supposed fact for example that Japan alone has four distinct seasons (四季, shiki), color Japanese thinking and behaviour. Thus, human nature in Japan is, peculiarly, an extension of nature itself.
3. The Japanese language has a unique grammatical structure and native lexical corpus whose idiosyncratic syntax and connotations condition the Japanese to think in peculiar patterns unparalleled in other human languages. The Japanese language is also uniquely vague. Foreigners who speak it fluently therefore, may be correct in their usage, but the thinking behind it remains inalienably soaked in the alien framework of their original language's thought patterns. This is the Japanese version of the Sapir–Whorf hypothesis, according to which grammar determines world-view.
4. Japanese psychology, influenced by the language, is defined by a particular cast of dependency wishes or desires (甘え, amae) that conduce to a unique form of 'human relationship' (人間関係, ningen kankei), in which clearly defined boundaries between self and other are ambiguous or fluid, leading to a psychomental and social ideal of the fusion of ego and alter (自他合一, jita gōitsu).
5. Japanese social structures consistently remould human associations in terms of an archaic family or household model (家, ie) characterized by vertical relations (縦社会, tate-shakai), clan (氏, uji), and (foster-)parent-child patterns (親分・子分, oyabun, kobun). As a result, the individual (個人, kojin) cannot properly exist, since groupism (集団主義, shūdan-shugi) will always prevail.

== Major works ==
- Kuki, Shūzō (九鬼周造). 1930. 「いき」の構造 English tr. An Essay on Japanese Taste: The Structure of 'Iki'. John Clark; Sydney, Power Publications, 1996.
- Watsuji, Tetsurō (和辻哲郞). 1935. Fûdo (風土). Tokyo, Iwanami Shoten. trans. Geoffrey Bownas, as Climate. Unesco 1962.
- Japanese Ministry of Education (文部省). 1937. 國體の本義 (Kokutai no hongi). tr. as Kokutai no hongi. Cardinal principles of the national entity of Japan, Cambridge, MA: Harvard UP, 1949.
- Nishida, Kitarō (西田幾多郞). 1940. 日本文化の問題 (Nihon Bunka no mondai). Tokyo.
- Nakane, Chie (中根千枝). 1967. タテ社会の人間関係 (Human relations in a vertical society) English tr Japanese Society, Weidenfeld & Nicolson, London, UK, 1970.
- Mishima, Yukio (三島由紀夫). 1969. Bunka Bôeiron (文化防衛論, A Defense of Culture). Tokyo, Japan: Shinchôsha.
- Doi, Takeo (土居健郎). 1971. 「甘え」の構造 (The Structure of 'Amae'). Tokyo, Japan: Kôbundô. trans.The Anatomy of Dependence Kodansha, Tokyo 1974
- Izaya Ben-Dasan, ('translated' by Yamamoto Shichihei:山本七平) 1972 Nihonkyō ni tsuite (日本教について), Tokyo, Bungei Shunjû
- Hisao, Ōtsuka, Takeyoshi, Kawashima, Takeo, Doi. 「Amae」to shakai kagaku.Tokyo, Kōbundō 1976
- Tsunoda, Tadanobu (角田忠信). 1978. Nihonjin no Nō (日本人の脳―脳の働きと東西の文化, The Japanese brain). Tokyo, Japan: Taishūkan Shoten (大修館書店) ISBN 4-469-21068-4.
- Murakami, Yasusuke (村上泰亮), Kumon Shunpei (公文俊平), Satō Seizaburō (佐藤誠三郎). 1979. The 'Ie' Society as a Civilization (文明としてのイエ社会) Tokyo, Japan: Chūō Kōronsha.
- The International Research Center for Japanese Culture Structural Studies (日本文化構造学研究会) : The "Structure of 自然Jinen ( Nature) in Japanese Culture" Series 2017 ISBN 978-4-9909814-0-2, Lafcadio in Japan Code ... Seeking a Lost Spiritual Period 2022.... ISBN 978-4-9909814-4-0, Four elements in mythology: seeking a world nature philosophy 2023 ISBN 978-4-9909814-5-7. NCID BD03146518

== See also ==
- Bunmei-kaika
- Heita Kawakatsu
- Honne and tatemae
- International Research Center for Japanese Studies
- Ishin-denshin
- Japanese nationalism
- Japanology
- Kokutai
- National psychology
- Takeshi Umehara
- Yamato-damashii
- Japanification
- Axial Age
