= Japan Society =

Japan Society may refer to:

- Japan Society (Manhattan)
- The Japan Society of the UK
- Japan Society of Applied Physics

== See also ==
- Japanese society, or Culture of Japan
- Japanese Society (book)
