= Tadanobu =

- Gender: Male

Origin
- Origin: Japanese
- Meaning: Different meanings depending on the kanji used

Tadanobu (written: 忠信 or 忠忱) is a masculine Japanese given name. Notable people with the name include:

- Tadanobu Asano (浅野 忠信) (born 1973), Japanese actor
- Ogasawara Tadanobu (小笠原 忠忱) (1862–1897), Japanese daimyō
- Satō Tadanobu (佐藤 忠信) (1161–1186), Japanese samurai
- Tadanobu Tsunoda (角田 忠信), Japanese writer
