= Ambition =

Character trait associated with pursuit of lofty goals

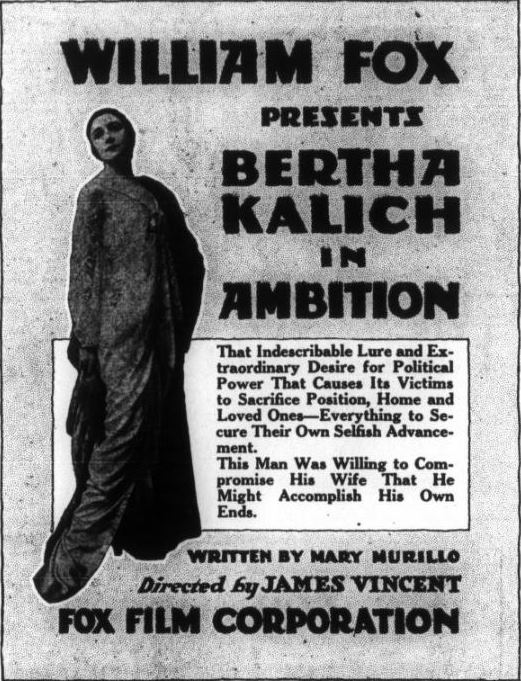
1916 advertisement for a film titled Ambition, with text negatively characterizing the trait

Ambition is a character trait that describes people who are driven to better their station or to succeed at lofty goals.

It has been categorized both as a virtue and as a vice. The use of the word "ambitious" in William Shakespeare's Julius Caesar (1599), for example, points to its use to describe someone who is ruthless in seeking out positions of power and influence:

The noble Brutus
Hath told you Caesar was ambitious:
If it were so, it was a grievous fault.

Today, however, someone may be described as "ambitious" who has more benevolent aspirations: someone who has lofty goals, drive, initiative, tenacity, and the pursuit of excellence.

Aristotle encountered the same ambiguity in Greek, where philotimos (φιλότιμος) (ambition) and aphilotimos (ἀφιλότιμος) (lack of ambition) each had positive or negative connotations depending on the context. He was unable to discover a good term that unambiguously described the desirable golden mean for this trait: "as there is no recognized term for the observance of the mean, the extremes fight, so to speak, for what seems an empty place".

== Origin and nature ==
Ambition has been interpreted as the resolute culmination of a bold personal decision, but also as a receptive acceptance of an externally-provided great destiny. It can be characterized as a drive or a goal that makes the person with ambition uncomfortable until they have realized their goals. This discomfort can in part arise from the fact that the extraordinary goals that characterize ambition tend to come to public notice. David Hume called it "the most incurable and inflexible of human passions".

Various philosophers have taken different views of ambition. Aristotle described it as virtue born of the love of achieving noble purposes, though he was ambivalent about its potential ends. Philosopher Agnes Callard contrasts ambition with aspiration: in her view, ambition concerns goals with already-ascertained value: money, power, fame, and the like. Aspiration concerns goals that one does not yet fully understand the value of, but that one hopes to understand in the process of reaching for them.
