= Amae =

Concept in Nihonjinron

Amae (甘え, amae) is a Japanese concept referring to a form of emotional dependence or indulgent reliance on others, often characterized by a desire to be loved, cared for, or indulged by someone perceived as an authority figure or caregiver. The term originates from the verb amaeru (甘える), meaning "to depend on another's benevolence" or "to act in a way that presumes indulgence." It was introduced as a psychological and cultural framework by Japanese psychoanalyst Takeo Doi in his 1971 book The Anatomy of Dependence (甘えの構造, Amae no Kōzō), where he explored amae as a key to understanding interpersonal relationships and social behavior in Japanese culture. Its universality and interpretation remain subjects of debate among scholars.

== Etymology and definition ==
The noun amae derives from the intransitive verb amaeru, itself rooted in the adjective amai (甘い), meaning "sweet" or "indulgent". In everyday use, amaeru describes behaviors such as a child seeking parental affection or an adult playfully relying on a spouse or superior's goodwill. Doi redefined amae as a noun to encapsulate a broader psychological need: the desire for passive love and acceptance, often without explicit reciprocation. He described it as "helplessness and the desire to be loved," distinguishing it from Western notions of independence by emphasizing its role in fostering closeness.

In Doi's view, amae is not merely childish dependence but a culturally sanctioned dynamic that persists into adulthood, shaping relationships across familial, social, and professional spheres. For example, a person exhibiting amae might act vulnerably, expecting indulgence from a caregiver—be it a parent, partner, or boss—without resentment.

== Psychological and cultural significance ==
Doi argued that amae originates in the infant-mother relationship, emerging when a child realizes its mother is a separate entity yet indispensable. This "craving for close contact" becomes a prototype for Japanese social bonds, where dependency is nurtured rather than suppressed, unlike what Doi saw in Western child-rearing. He linked amae to Japan's group-oriented society, evident in practices like nonverbal empathy (sasshi, 察し), restraint in self-assertion (enryo, 遠慮), and the interplay of private feelings (honne, 本音) and public facade (tatemae, 建前).

Unlike Western ideals of autonomy, amae blends intimacy with a subtle power dynamic: the "dependent" seeks indulgence, and the "caregiver" provides it willingly. Doi suggested this extends beyond family to hierarchical relationships, such as between employees and employers, reflecting collectivist values. While amae may imply immaturity, it is also valued as a cornerstone of affectionate, trusting bonds in Japan.

Doi posited that while dependency needs are universal, Japan's explicit vocabulary and cultural acceptance of amae set it apart. He contrasted this with Western cultures, where independence is often prioritized, and overt reliance might be stigmatized in adulthood. Yet, he noted amae-like behaviors exist globally—such as a spouse expecting care after a long day—suggesting it's the formal recognition of amae that distinguishes Japan.

== Criticism and debate ==
This view has faced critique. Scholars of nihonjinron (theories of Japanese uniqueness) argue Doi overstated amae as uniquely Japanese, overlooking similar dynamics elsewhere. Cross-cultural psychologists have compared amae to attachment theory, noting parallels with secure dependence, though without Japan's cultural framing.

Critics also question whether amae is as central to Japanese identity as Doi claimed. Some argue it reflects middle-class, urban norms rather than a universal trait, with rural or indigenous groups like the Ainu and Ryukyuan people potentially showing different relational patterns. Others contend Doi's Freudian lens exaggerated amae's psychological depth, reducing complex social behaviors to a single motive.

== Influence and legacy ==
The Anatomy of Dependence popularized amae beyond Japan, influencing anthropology, psychology, and cultural studies. It has been applied to analyses of Japanese literature, management styles, and even international relations, where Japan's "dependent" postwar stance toward the U.S. is sometimes framed as amae. The concept continues to spark discussion about dependency, intimacy, and cultural identity in a globalized world.

== See also ==
- Attachment theory
- Collectivism
- Nihonjinron
- Takeo Doi
