= Smile mask syndrome =

Psychological disorder proposed by professor Makoto Natsume

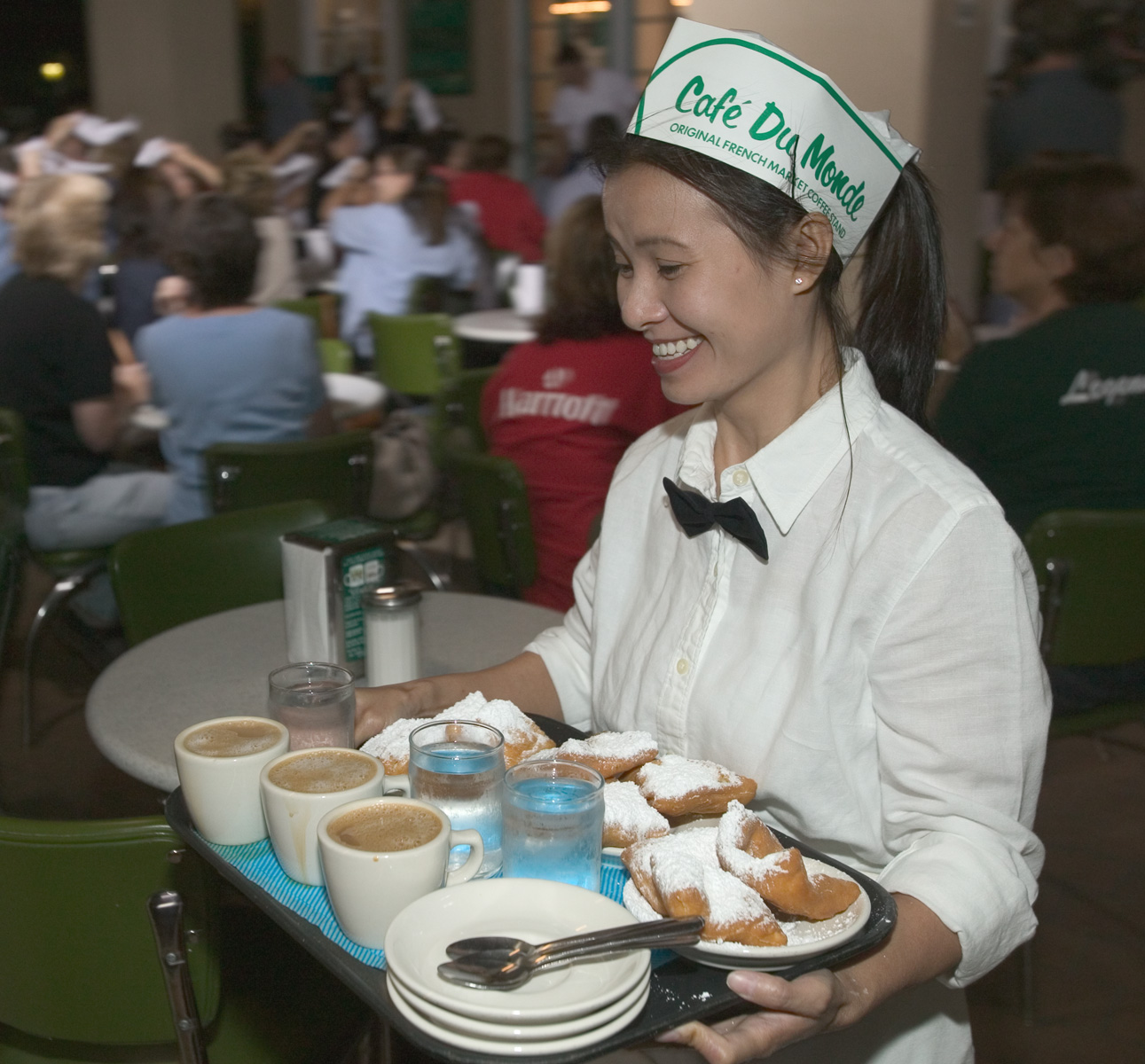
A waitress at a restaurant is expected to exhibit positivity, such as smiling and expressing positive emotion towards customers

Smile mask syndrome (Japanese: スマイル仮面症候群, Hepburn: sumairu kamen shōkōgun), abbreviated SMS, is a psychological disorder proposed by professor Makoto Natsume of Osaka Shoin Women's University, in which subjects develop depression and physical illness as a result of unnaturally prolonged smiling.

== Origin ==
Natsume proposed the disorder after counselling students from the university in his practice and noticing that a number of students had spent so much time faking their smiles that they were unaware that they were smiling even while relating stressful or upsetting experiences to him. Natsume attributes this to the great importance placed on smiling in the Japanese service industry, particularly for young women.

== Description ==
Smiling is an important skill for Japanese women working in the service industry. Almost all service industry companies in Japan require their female staff to smile for long periods of time. Natsume says that his female patients often talk about the importance of smiling when the topic of the conversation is on their workplace. He relates examples of patients saying that they felt their smile had a large effect on whether they were hired or not, and that their superiors had stressed the effect that good smiles had on customers. According to Natsume, this atmosphere sometimes causes women to smile unnaturally for so long that they start to suppress their real emotions and become depressed.

Japanese author Tomomi Fujiwara notes that the demand for a common smile in the workplace emerged in Japan around the 1980s, and he blames the cultural changes wrought by Tokyo Disneyland, opened in 1983, for popularizing the demand for an obligatory smile in the workplace.

Smile mask syndrome has also been identified in Korea. Korean writer Bae Woo-ri noted that smiling gives one a competitive advantage and has become a necessary attribute of many employees, just like a "neat uniform". Yoon-Do-rahm, a psychology counselor, compared the current society, which is full of smile-masks, to a clown show; both are characterized by plentiful, yet empty and fake, smiles.

=== Aches ===
Smile mask syndrome can cause physical problems as well as mental ones. Natsume relates that many of his patients developed muscle aches and headaches as a result of prolonged smiling and that these are similar to the symptoms of repetitive strain injury.

== See also ==
- Honne and tatemae
- Emotional labor
