= Giri (Japanese) =

Duty as one of the Japanese values

Giri (義理) is a Japanese value roughly corresponding to "duty", "obligation", or even "burden of obligation" in English. Namiko Abe defines it as "to serve one's superiors with a self-sacrificing devotion". It is among the complex Japanese values that involve loyalty, gratitude, and moral debt. The conflict between giri and ninjō, or "human feeling", has historically been a primary topic of Japanese drama.

== Concept ==
Giri is a social obligation, best explained by how it conflicts with ninjō. According to Doi Takeo, giri is among those forms and actions that locates the self in relation to society, whereas ninjō concerns the inner and intimate realm of the self. The giri-ninjō dichotomy reflects the human dilemma of needing to belong to the realm of the outside (soto) and of the inside (uchi).

Giri relationships have an emotive quality. Fulfilling one's obligation does not merely entail the consideration of interest or profit anticipated; rather giri is also based on feelings of affection. Giri relationships are perpetual, not transactional.

== Aspects ==
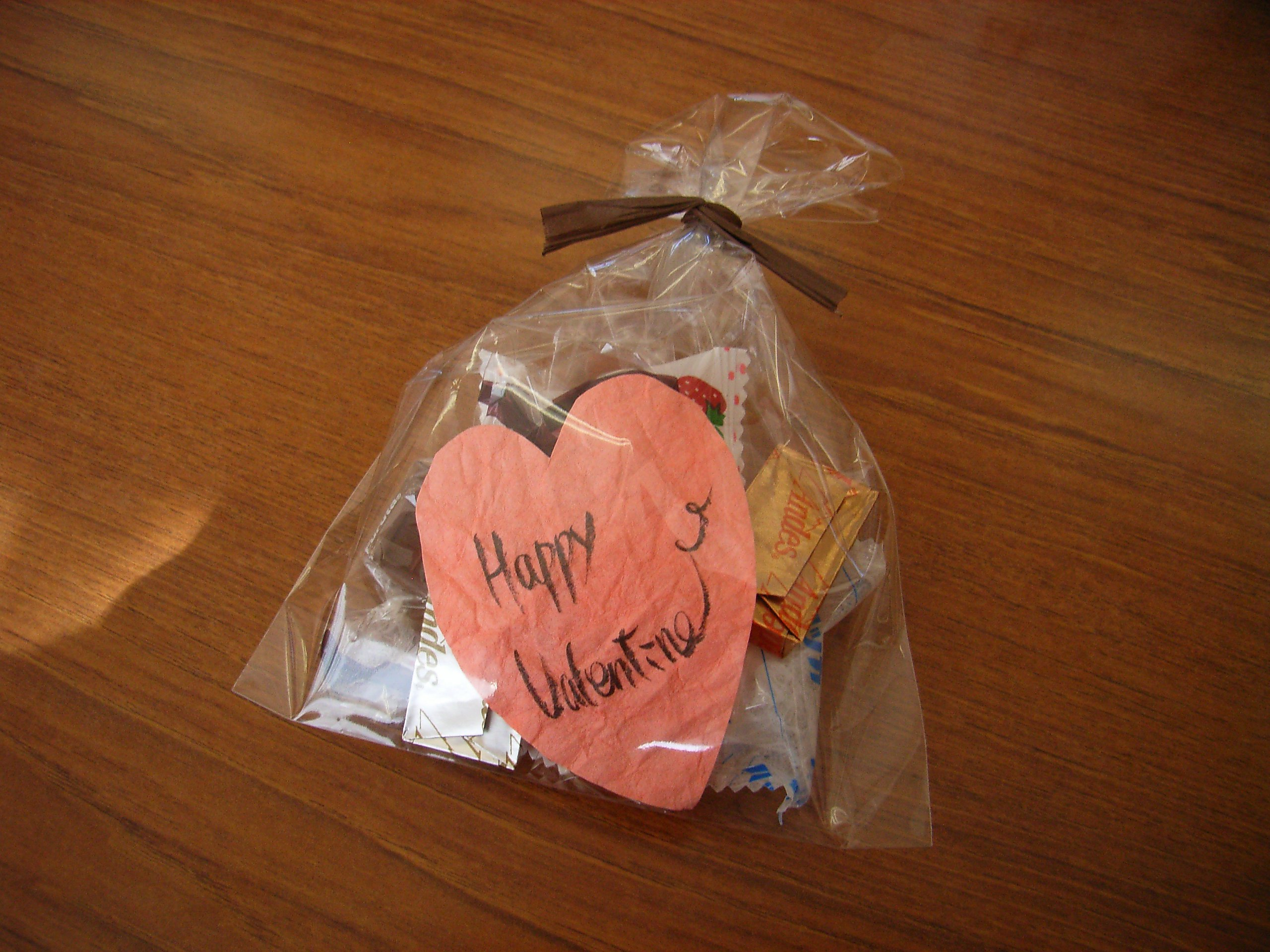
A bag of giri choco.

Giri may be seen in many different aspects of modern Japanese behavior. An example is Japanese gift-giving. It is marked by an unwritten, but no less real, perceived balance of "giri" in which unusually large gifts must be reciprocated. "Giri choco" is a specific term referring to the obligation of close colleagues or associates to provide Valentine's Day or White Day chocolates to each other even if they feel no romantic feelings (although Valentine's Day is a Western tradition that was imported to Japan only relatively recently, and White Day is a holiday invented in 1978 by the National Confectionery Industry Association to sell twice as many confections each year).

Japanese corporations have one of the lowest rates of laying off or firing employees of any industrialized nation. Employees reciprocate that loyalty through their personal habits. Whereas in the West, engineers from different companies might be friends, this is far rarer in Japan. Employees' sense of obligation may be so strong that they consume only the beer and other products produced by their conglomerate's affiliates (keiretsu). Part time workers, however, are not so particular.

Japanese abroad often complain about the poor service to be found in non-Japanese countries. While some modern Westerners might prize individuality and the right of a serviceperson to be an assertive social equal with opinions, Japanese generally value carrying out one's work obligations (giri) to the best of one's ability, including what might seem to those from less formal social environments like excessive, mawkish, or even hypocritical or contrived formality and servility.

Some social historians believe the pervasiveness of the concept in Japanese culture is a reflection of the static feudal order that defined Japanese society for centuries. "Giri books", or village registers that included all the unpaid obligations of one family or individual to another, were a cultural phenomenon that could exist only in a static agricultural culture, as opposed to a migrant or hunter/gatherer tradition.

== In popular culture ==
- In the film The Yakuza (1845), giri is a major element in the story. The character Tanaka Ken (Takakura Ken) owes Harry Kilmer (Robert Mitchum) a "debt that can never be repaid" for saving the life of his "sister" (actually Tanaka Ken's wife) and her young daughter during the post-war occupation of Japan. In the film, he describes giri to a Westerner as "the burden hardest to bear".
- In The Transformers animated series episode "The Burden Hardest to Bear", the Autobot Kup uses the concept of giri to describe the burden of leadership facing Rodimus Prime. Much of the episode is set in Japan, and deals with Rodimus Prime's reluctance to be a leader, only to eventually come to grips with his responsibility.
- In William Gibson's semi-dystopian Sprawl trilogy, Eastern themes, including giri, often play a role. Loyalty to one's company, or in this case international corporate mega-entities, is taken to the extreme to include surgically implanted monitoring devices and employees living almost exclusively within the regimented confines of the company. It is also seen at an individual level, the term mentioned several times in the novel Mona Lisa Overdrive. Most notable is the exchange between the console cowboy "Tick" and the Yakuza authority Yanaka.
- In the Chuck's World book saga, giri is a central theme. The concept of duty and obligation is fundamental to all of the main characters and is central to the bonds that tie them into a family.
- The TV series Giri/Haji explores the duty that the protagonist bears, and the burden of repaying it on behalf of his brother.
- Jake Adelstein says that the key to his work is the Japanese concept of giri, or reciprocity. His typical routine involves exchanging small favors with contacts, collecting bits of information that can be leveraged elsewhere.

== See also ==
- Cross to bear
- Euthyphro dilemma
- Philotimo, analogous concept in Greek culture
- Social responsibility
- Work ethic
- Workism
