= Giri choco =

Valentine's Day chocolate in Japan

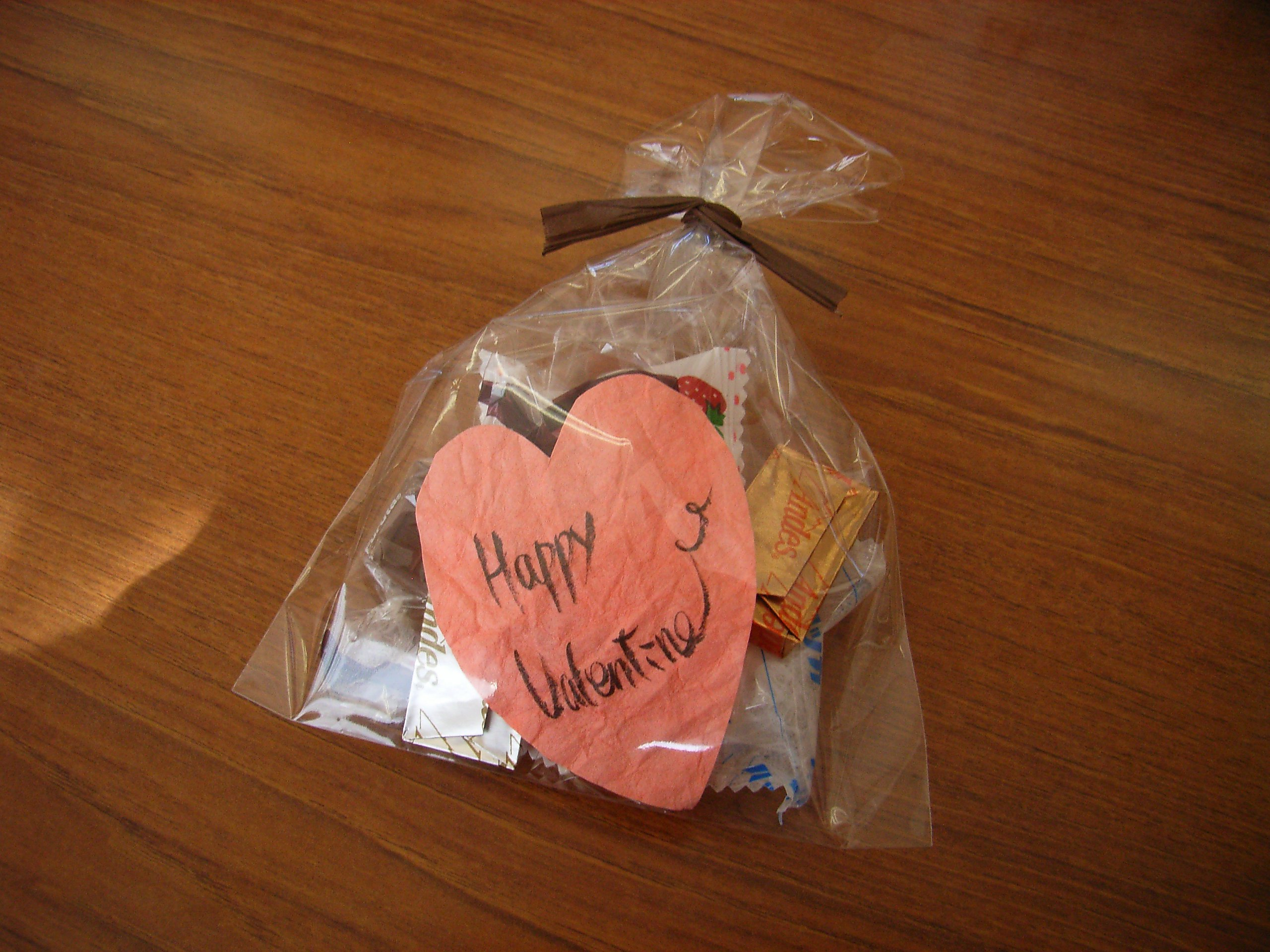
A bag of giri choco

Giri choco (義理チョコ; lit. "obligation chocolate") is chocolate given by women to men on Valentine's Day in Japan as a customary gift. Unlike honmei choco, which is given to romantic partners, giri choco is a type of chocolate that women give to male co-workers, bosses, and acquaintances out of appreciation and politeness. Men generally reciprocate by giving women gifts on White Day, which is celebrated on March 14.

== History ==
On Valentine's Day in Japan, giri choco is inexpensive chocolate that women give to male co-workers and friends to show appreciation and respect as opposed to honmei choco, chocolate that is given to romantic partners. While Japan has a strong gift-giving culture, the origins of giving chocolate on Valentine's Day is unclear. One popular explanation is that the trend was started by junior high school girls, who would give handmade chocolate to boys to see if they returned their affections, and it later became commercialized in the mid-1950s, with the first Valentine's sale taking place in 1958 at Mary's Chocolate.

Harumichi Yamada from Tokyo Keizai University stated that the practice of giving chocolate occurred because women expressing their love to men was considered disgraceful, and confectioneries capitalized on chocolate as a way for them to profess their love; however, as the social status of women improved, Valentine's Day was later considered a day where women give chocolate to men, through which the giri choco custom emerged. Sachiko Horiguchi from Temple University, Japan Campus suggested that the giri choco custom first occurred in the 1980s where working women were obligated to give chocolate to their co-workers and bosses, as both of the Japanese corporate and gift-giving cultures made it appropriate for this exchange to take place.

According to the Japanese food writer Ayumi Ichikawa, as of 2019, some Japanese chocolate confectioneries make 70% of their annual business through Valentine's Day. The Chocolate & Cocoa Association of Japan reported that, in 2005, approximately US$400,000,000 (equivalent to $659,396,831 in 2025) was spent on Valentine's Day chocolates. The average woman spent US$36 (equivalent to $55.9 in 2025) on giri choco in 2007, while it dropped to ¥1,033 in 2019.

In the 1980s, White Day began as a tradition where men would reciprocate giri choco gifts in order to boost sales. White Day gift sales are heavily influenced by sales from Valentine's Day.

=== Decline ===
The tradition of giving giri choco is losing popularity in Japan beginning in the late 2010s and is criticized for pressuring women to buy chocolate for their co-workers to avoid offending them. Some companies have banned the practice, describing it as power harassment. Instead, women opt to give friendship chocolate (友チョコ, tomo choco) to their friends. A 2017 survey from 3M showed that only 40% of the women surveyed planned to give chocolate to their male co-workers, compared to 80% in a 2007 survey conducted by a different company. In 2018, Godiva Chocolatier published a full-page advertisement calling for workplaces to ban the practice of giving giri choco, though some commentators described this act as stealth marketing.

As of 2025 the practice of giving giri choco was described in Bloomberg News as "almost dead", citing several polls showing few women intended to give giri choco for Valentine's that year. The causes were described as the backlash and perceived inconvenience, as well as the impact of the COVID-19 pandemic on workers interacting with their colleagues in person.

== Honmei choco ==
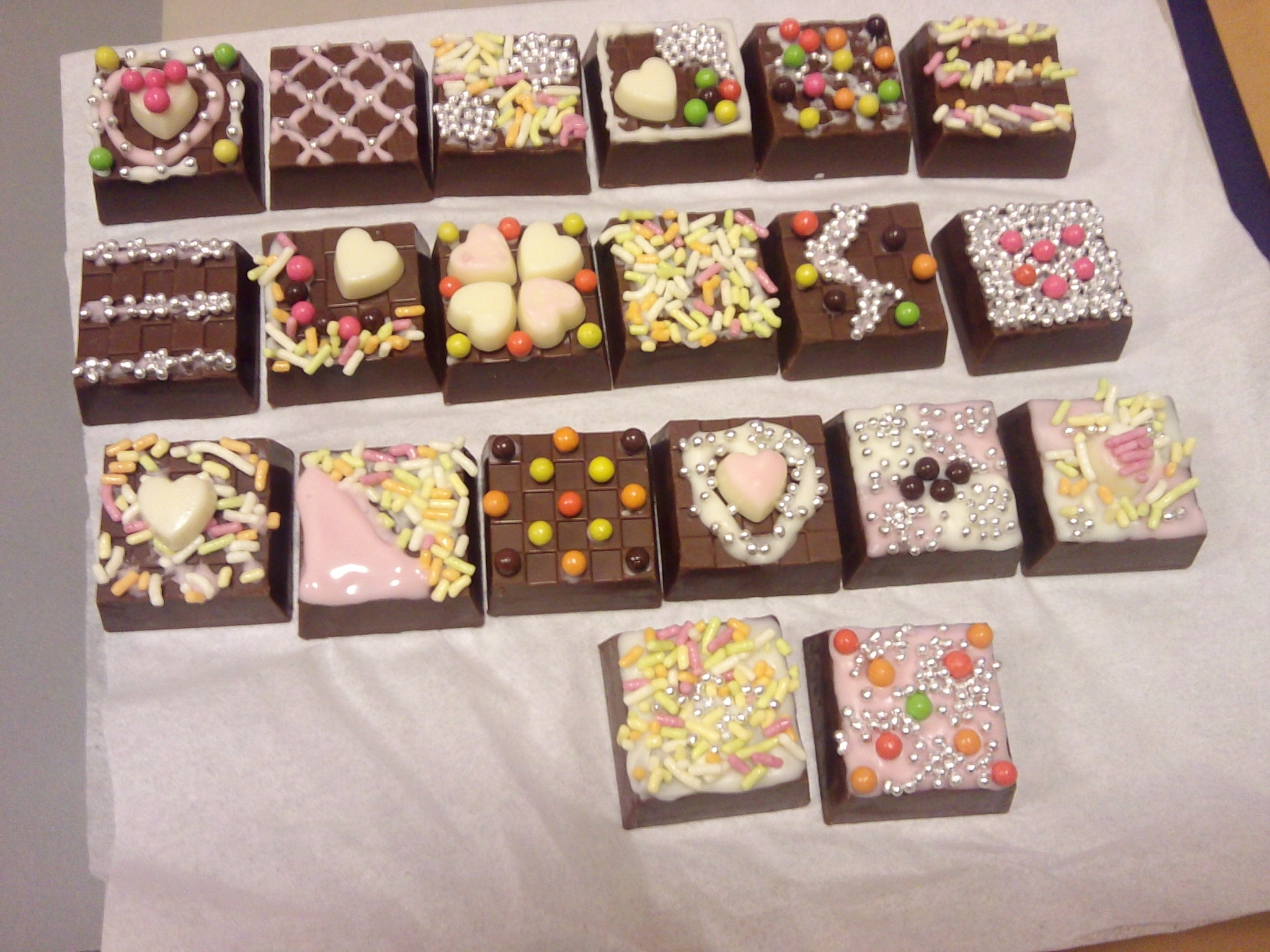
Honmei choco

Honmei choco (本命チョコ; "true feeling chocolate") in Japan is chocolate given by women on Valentine's Day to men whom the giver has romantic feelings for. This is often given to husbands, boyfriends, and desired partners. Honmei chocolate is usually higher-quality and more expensive than giri choco ("obligation chocolate"), which is given to male coworkers and other men the woman has no romantic attachment to.

Homemade honmei choco is also popular.

This is generally reciprocated on White Day, celebrated on March 14, when men buy candy and gifts for women.

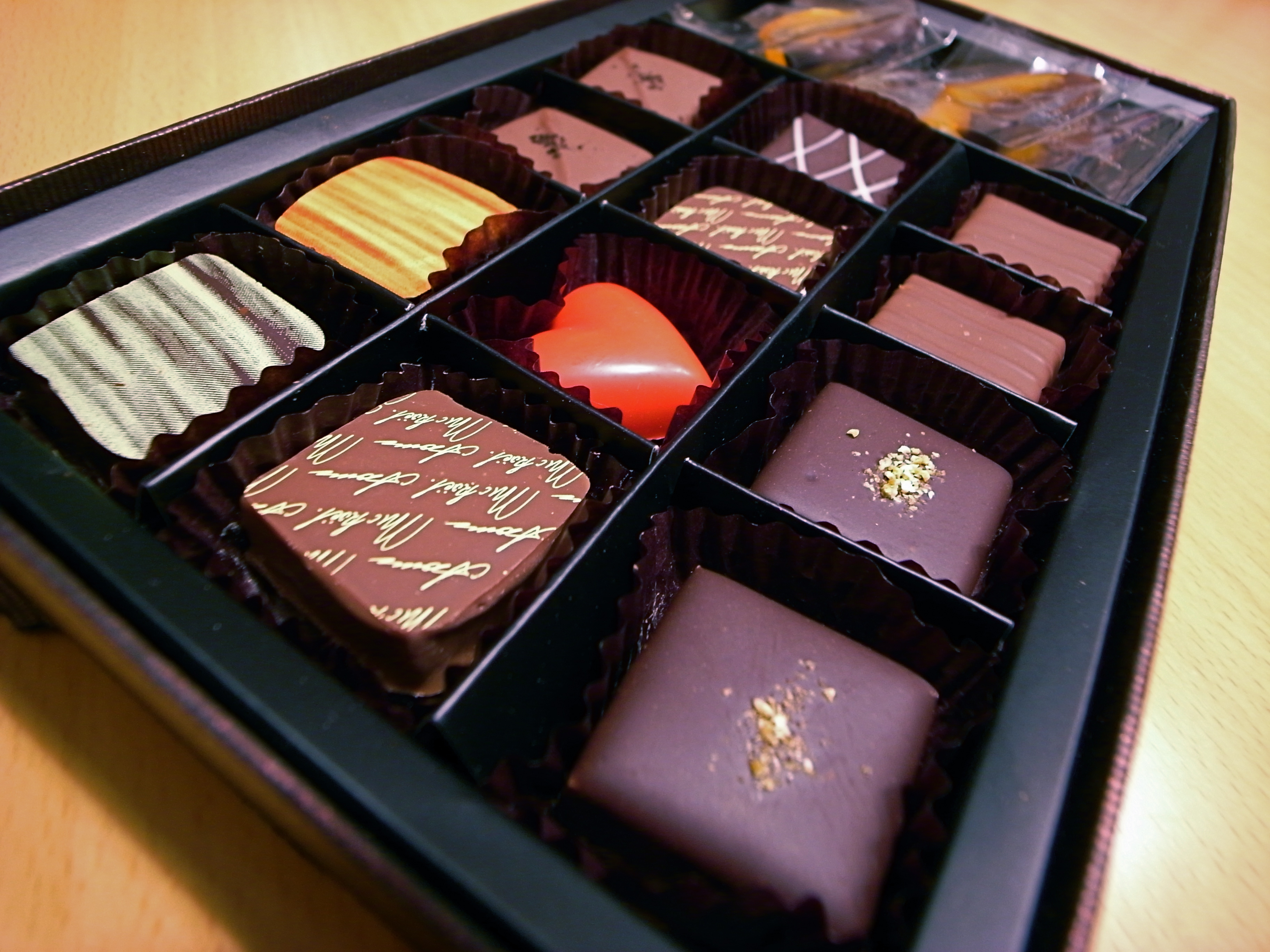

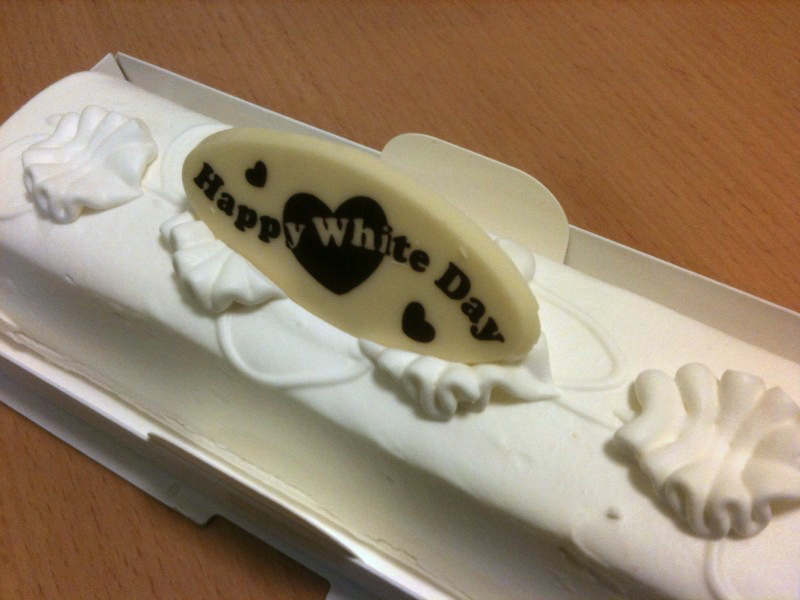

== See also ==
- Chocolate in Japan
- Giri (Japanese)
