= Philotimo =

Greek notion of duty and honor

Philotimo (also spelled filotimo; Greek: φιλότιμο) is a Greek noun that has the literal translation of "love of honor". However, philotimo is difficult to translate as it describes a complex array of virtues.

== Ancient uses ==
The word is used in early writings, sometimes in a bad sense; Plato's Republic uses philotimon (φιλότιμον) ironically: "covetous of honor"; other writers use philotimeomai (φιλοτιμέομαι) in the sense of "lavish upon". However, later uses develop the word in its more noble senses. By the beginning of the Christian era, the word was firmly positive in its implications and its use in the Bible probably cemented its use in modern Greek culture.

The word philotimon is used extensively in Hellenistic period literature.

== Biblical uses ==
The word appears three times in the text of letters written by the Apostle Paul. Paul was a fluent Greek speaker and his writing shows he was well educated in Hellene literature. His letters were originally written in Greek and therefore the choice of the word was deliberate and the sophisticated choice of an educated man.

1. In Romans 15:20 he makes it his philotimo (he uses the verb φιλοτιμέομαι, [philotiméome]) to preach the good news of the Gospel to people who have not heard it.
2. In 2nd Corinthians 5:9 he uses it to describe his "labour" in the sense of his life's work and strivings.
3. In 1st Thessalonians 4:11 he uses it to describe the sort of ambition believers should have to conduct their lives with philotimo: lives above reproach, well-regarded by their community for their kindness.

It is a difficult word to translate into English and is rendered variously depending on the Bible translation. Valid alternatives include; ambition, endeavour earnestly, aspire, being zealous, strive eagerly, desire very strongly, or study. In each case Paul is conveying a desire to do a good thing and his choice of word gives this honourable pursuit extra emphasis.

== Modern uses ==
Philotimo is still used today. In its simplest form, the term means conscientiously honoring one's responsibilities and duties, and not allowing one's honor, dignity, and pride to be sullied.

In Orthodox Christian ethos, philotimo has a deep spiritual dimension. Saint Paisios of Mount Athos described it as "The reverent distillation of goodness, the love shown by humble people, from which every trace of self has been filtered out. Their hearts are full of gratitude towards God and their fellow men; and out of spiritual sensitivity, they try to repay the slightest good others do for them."

== See also ==
- Giri (Japanese)
