= Guilt–shame–fear spectrum of cultures =

Main emotion used for social control

In cultural anthropology, the distinction between a guilt society or guilt culture, shame society or shame culture, and a fear society or culture of fear, has been used to categorize different cultures. The differences can apply to how behavior is governed with respect to government laws, business rules, or social etiquette. This classification has been applied especially to what anthropologist Ruth Benedict called "apollonian" societies, sorting them according to the emotions they use to control individuals (especially children) and maintaining social order, swaying them into norm obedience and conformity.

- In a guilt society, control is maintained by creating and continually reinforcing the feeling of guilt (and the expectation of punishment now or in the afterlife) for certain condemned behaviors. The guilt worldview focuses on law and punishment. A person in this type of culture may ask, "Is my behavior fair or unfair?" This type of culture also emphasizes individual conscience.
- In a shame society (sometimes called an honor–shame culture), the means of control is the inculcation of shame and the complementary threat of ostracism. The shame–honor worldview seeks an "honor balance" and can lead to revenge dynamics. A person in this type of culture may ask, "How will people look at me if I do X?" Shame cultures are typically based on the concepts of pride and honor.
- In a fear society, control is kept by the fear of retribution. The fear worldview focuses on physical dominance. A person in this culture may ask, "Will someone hurt me if I do this?"

The terminology was popularized by Ruth Benedict in The Chrysanthemum and the Sword, who described American culture as a "guilt culture" and Japanese culture as a "shame culture".

== Guilt societies ==
In a guilt society, the primary method of social control is the inculcation of feelings of guilt for behaviors that the individual believes to be undesirable. A prominent feature of guilt societies is the provision of sanctioned releases from guilt for certain behaviors, whether before or after the fact. There is opportunity in such cases for authority figures to derive power, money, or other advantages by manipulating the conditions of guilt and the forgiveness of guilt.

Paul Hiebert characterizes guilt society as follows:

Guilt is a feeling that arises when we violate the absolute standards of morality within us, when we violate our conscience. A person may suffer from guilt although no one else knows of his or her misdeed; this feeling of guilt is relieved by confessing the misdeed and making restitution. True guilt cultures rely on an internalized conviction of sin as the enforcer of good behavior, not, as shame cultures do, on external sanctions. Guilt cultures emphasize punishment and forgiveness as ways of restoring the moral order; shame cultures stress self-denial and humility as ways of restoring the social order. (Hiebert 1985, 213)

== Shame culture ==
=== Balkans ===
In the opposite of the majority of countries in Europe, countries in the Balkan region, especially Albania, are characterized as having a strong shame culture.

=== China ===
In China, the concept of shame (simplified Chinese: 耻; traditional Chinese: 恥; pinyin: chǐ) is widely accepted due to Confucian teachings. In Chapter 2 of the Analects, Confucius is quoted as saying:

Lead the people with law and organize them with punishments, and they will avoid the punishments but will be without a sense of shame. Lead them with virtue and organize them with ritual, and in addition to developing a sense of shame, they will bring order to themselves.

=== Romani ===
To the Roma, though living as local minorities in mostly Christian countries, the concept of lajav ("shame") is important, while the concept of bezax ("sin") does not have such significance.

=== Arab culture ===
Arab culture places high value on a person's dignity, honor, and reputation. Often this results in instances where measures that would be considered drastic outside the culture are taken, and are considered acceptable, to restore honor to an individual, a family unit, or a tribe. A classic example of this is the prevalence of honor killings.

== See also ==
- Asabiyyah
- Blood money
- Emotional blackmail
- Face (sociological concept)
- Feud
- Hubris (law)
- Revenge dynamics, related to honor (shame) societies and blood feuds.
