= Tadanobu Tsunoda =

Tadanobu Tsunoda (角田忠信, Tsunoda Tadanobu, 8 October 1926) is a physician and a Japanese author, most known for his ideas regarding the "Japanese brain".

== Theory ==
According to Tsunoda's theory, the Japanese people use their brains in a unique way, different from "western" brains. The Japanese brain, argues Tsunoda, hears or processes music using the left hemisphere, where western brains use the opposite or right hemisphere to process music. Tsunoda further argues that brains use languages as operating systems, thus the user "giving meaning to vowels." Tsunoda has had one essay, "An approach to an integrated sensorimotor system in the human central brain and a subconscious computer", included in a prestigious British publication, Sociocultural Studies of Mind (1995), edited by James V. Wertsch, Pablo del Rio, and Amelia Alvarez.

== Criticism ==
Journalist Karel van Wolferen has written of Tsunoda that "his testing methods are highly suspect. My impression, based on an account by one of his foreign guinea-pigs, is that auto-suggestion plays an important role. Yet his books sell well in Japan, and his views have been officially credited to the extent of being introduced abroad by the semi-governmental Japan Foundation".

In a 1991 paper in JALT journal, linguist Thomas Scovel writes:

"A major criticism of Tsunoda's neurolinguistic work is replicability. Uyehara and Cooper (1980) and Hatta and Diamond (1981) have replicated Tsunoda's experiments and have found no differences in the way Japanese and non-Japanese speakers process sounds in their cerebral hemispheres. In other words, using Tsunoda's own methods, these neurolinguists have discovered that Japanese speakers appear to process non-linguistic sounds the same way Korean, Chinese, and English speakers do."

== See also ==
- Pseudoscience
- Nihonjinron
- Essentialism
