= Honne and tatemae =

Japanese concept of true feelings vs. public behavior

In Japan, honne and tatemae are Japanese terms relating to a person's feelings and outward behaviors. Honne refers to a person's true feelings and desires (本音, hon'ne; "true sound"), and tatemae refers contrastingly to the behavior and opinions one displays in public (建前, tatemae; "built in front", "façade"). This distinction began to be made in the post-war era.

A person's honne may be contrary to what is expected by society or what is required according to one's position and circumstances, and they are often kept hidden, except with one's closest friends. Tatemae is what is expected by society and required according to one's position and circumstances, and these may or may not match one's honne. In many cases, tatemae leads to outright telling of lies—which English speakers might describe as "white lies"—in order to avoid exposing the true inward feelings.

== Causes ==
In Japanese culture, public failure and the disapproval of others are seen as particular sources of shame and reduced social standing, so it is common to avoid direct confrontation or disagreement in most social contexts. Traditionally, social norms dictate that one should attempt to minimize discord; failure to do so might be seen as insulting or aggressive. For this reason, the Japanese tend to go to great lengths to avoid conflict, especially within the context of large groups. By upholding this social norm, one is socially protected from such transgressions by others.

The conflict between honne and giri (social obligations) is one of the main topics of Japanese drama throughout the ages. For example, the protagonist would have to choose between carrying out his obligations to his family/feudal lord or pursuing a clandestine love affair.

== Effects ==
Contemporary phenomena such as hikikomori seclusion and parasite singles are seen as examples of late Japanese culture's growing problem of the new generation growing up unable to deal with the complexities of honne–tatemae and pressure of an increasingly consumerist society.

Though tatemae and honne are not a uniquely Japanese phenomenon, some Japanese people feel that it is unique to Japan, especially those who feel their culture is unique in having the concepts of "private mind" and "public mind". Although there might not be direct single word translations for honne and tatemae in some languages, they do have two-word descriptions; for example in English, "private mind" and "public mind".

A similar discord between one's true feeling and public appearance is observed in yase-gaman, a phrase whose meaning literally translates as "starving to [one's] skeleton", referring to being content or pretending to be so. Nowadays, the phrase is used for two different meanings, expressing the samurai virtue of self-discipline, silent moral heroism, or ridiculing stubbornness, face-savingness.

== Criticisms ==
Many scholars assert that honne–tatemae is a concept integral to understanding Japanese culture, such as Professor Takeo Doi, who considered the honne–tatemae divide to be of paramount importance in Japanese culture as well as other researchers like Ozaki, who utilized the concept to study Japanese perceptions of class and status. Despite this, there remain criticisms regarding the concept's uniqueness to Japan, as many argue that the concept is widespread rather than distinct to Japan.

Research has shown that many Japanese view the concept as unique and culturally significant. One study found that while foreign students' perceptions regarding examples of honne–tatemae were rather nuanced, Japanese students would often limit perspectives and reinforce stereotypes according to more rigid cultural prescriptions of the concept.

Some researchers suggest that the need for explicit words for tatemae and honne in Japanese culture is evidence that the concept is relatively new to Japan, whereas the unspoken understanding in many other cultures indicates a deeper internalization of the concepts. In any case, all cultures have conventions that help to determine appropriate communication and behavior in various social contexts which are implicitly understood without an explicit name for the social mores on which the conventions are based.

Hence other researchers have argued that this kind of dualism, separation of one's true feelings and what they present outwardly, is not culturally specific, one scholar even suggests that the concepts honne and tatemae may have originally stemmed from Chinese concepts of "Yang" and "Yin". Evidently similar concepts of "face" (as in "saving face") have been observed in several different societies and cultures.

== See also ==
- Ambivalence
- Double standard
- Egosyntonic and egodystonic
- Emotional conflict
- Face
- Japanese values
- Persona (psychology)
- Preference falsification
- Presentational and representational acting
- Self-discrepancy theory
- Smile mask syndrome, Japan
- Splitting (psychology)
- Tadanobu Tsunoda
- The Anatomy of Dependence, Japanese book
- True self and false self
- Uchi-soto
