= White Day =

Holiday in Asia

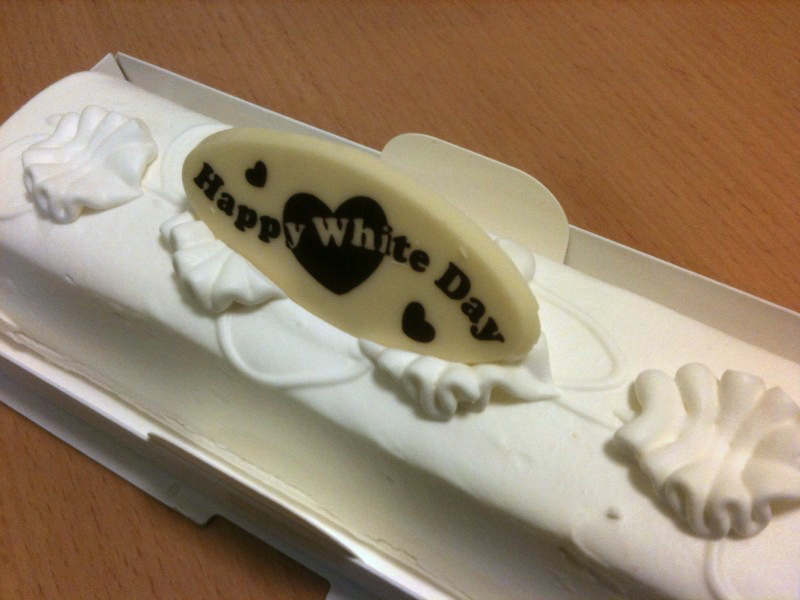
- White Day cake
- Observed by: Japan; regions in East and Southeast Asia
- Date: March 14
- Next time: March 14, 2027
- Frequency: Annual
- Related to: Valentine's Day

White Day

Chinese name
- Traditional Chinese: 白色情人節
- Simplified Chinese: 白色情人节
Transcriptions
Standard Mandarin
- Hanyu Pinyin: Báisè qíngrén jié

Burmese name
- Burmese: အဖြူနေ့

Vietnamese name
- Vietnamese: Ngày Valentine Trắng

Korean name
- Hangul: 화이트데이
Transcriptions
- Revised Romanization: Hwaiteu dei

Japanese name
- Katakana: ホワイトデー
Transcriptions
- Romanization: Howaito Dē

Khmer name
- Khmer: ថ្ងៃពណ៌ស

White Day is celebrated annually on March 14, one month after Valentine's Day, when men give reciprocal gifts to women who gave them gifts on Valentine's Day. It began in Japan in 1978; its observance has spread to several other East Asian regions like China, Taiwan, South Korea and countries worldwide.

== Origin ==
Though Valentine's Day was being celebrated in Japan by 1936, it did not begin to be popular until the 1970s, giving the day a different meaning from the Western observation. It was primarily an opportunity for girls to show that they like a boy. In 1978, a Fukuoka-based confectionery company, Ishimuramanseido, marketed marshmallows to men on March 14, calling it Marshmallow Day (マシュマロデー, Mashumaro Dē). White Day was first celebrated in 1978 in Japan. The National Confectionery Industry Association started it as an "answer day" to Valentine's Day on the grounds that men should pay back the women who gave them chocolate and other gifts on Valentine's Day.

Soon thereafter, confectionery companies began marketing white chocolate. Flowers and other gifts are also given on this day.

== Observation ==
White Day is celebrated one month after Valentine's Day, on March 14. With countries that observe White Day, typically Valentine's Day is celebrated by women and girls presenting chocolate gifts (either store-bought or handmade), usually to the other men and boys, as an expression of love, courtesy, or social obligation.

On White Day, the reverse happens: men who received a honmei-choco (本命チョコ, 'chocolate of love') or giri-choco (義理チョコ, 'courtesy chocolate') on Valentine's Day are expected to return the favor by giving gifts to the women. Gift exchanges happen between romantic partners, friends, and coworkers. Traditionally, popular White Day gifts include food like white chocolate, marshmallows, candy, cookies, and other "white" accessories like jewelry, bags, lotions, and lingerie.

Sometimes the term sanbai kaeshi (三倍返し, 'triple the return') is used to describe the generally recited rule for men that the return gift should be two to three times the worth of the Valentine's gift they received.

In the latter half of the 2010s, sales figures indicated a decline in the popularity of the observation. It was seen as a result of reduced sales of obligation chocolates on Valentine's Day. Another reason given for the reduction of popularity is the changing gender roles within Japanese culture.

=== International observation ===
Outside of Japan, the practice of giving response gifts one month after Valentine's Day has spread internationally. In those cultures, White Day is, for the most part, observed similarly. Some places where this occurs include China, South Korea, Taiwan, and Vietnam.

== See also ==
- Chocolate in Japan
- Hallmark holiday
- Pi Day, also observed on March 14 (represented as 3/14 in month-day format)
