= The Anatomy of Dependence =

1971 book by Takeo Doi

- Cover of the hardcover edition
- Author: Takeo Doi
- Original title: 甘えの構造
- Translator: John Bester
- Language: Japanese
- Subjects: Dependence, Japanese national characteristics, amae
- Publisher: Kodansha International
- Publication date: 1971
- Publication place: Japan
- English publication date: 1973
- Media type: Print
- Pages: 170 pp.
- ISBN: 0-87011-181-7
- OCLC: 756181
- Dewey Decimal: 150/.19/5
- LC Class: BF575.D34 D6413

The Anatomy of Dependence (甘えの構造, Amae no Kōzō) is a 1971 book by Japanese psychoanalyst Takeo Doi, discussing at length Doi's concept of amae, which he describes as a uniquely Japanese need to be in good favor with, and be able to depend on, the people around oneself. He likens this to behaving childishly in the assumption that parents will indulge you (Doi 2001:16), and claims that the ideal relationship is that of the parent–child, and all other relationships should strive for this degree of closeness (Doi 2001:39).

== Main concept ==
Amae (甘え) is the nominal form of the verb amaeru (甘える), which Doi uses to describe the behavior of a person attempting to induce an authority figure, such as a parent, spouse, teacher, or supervisor, to take care of them. The word is rarely used of oneself, but rather is applied descriptively to the behavior of other people. The person who is carrying out amae may beg or plead, or alternatively act selfishly while secure in the knowledge that the caregiver will indulge them. The behavior of children towards their parents is perhaps the most common example of amae, but Doi argued that child-rearing practices in the Western world seek to stop this kind of dependence, whereas in Japan it persists into adulthood in all kinds of social relationships. However, these cultural concepts do not apply to indigenous cultures in Japan, such as the Ainu people or the Ryukyuan people, the latter of which replaces amae with humor.

=== In literary context ===
Doi developed this idea to explain and describe many kinds of Japanese behavior. However, Doi states that while amae is not just a Japanese phenomenon, the Japanese are the only people known to have an extensive vocabulary for describing it. The reason for this is that amae is a major factor in Japanese interaction and customs. Doi argues that nonverbal empathic guesswork (察し sasshi), a fondness for unanimous agreement in decision-making, the ambiguity and hesitation of self-expression (遠慮 enryo), and the tatemae–honne dynamics are communicative manifestations of the amae psychology of Japanese people.

Doi translates amaeru as "to depend and presume upon another's benevolence". It indicates, for Doi, "helplessness and the desire to be loved". Amaeru can also be defined as "to wish to be loved", and denotes dependency needs. Amae is, in essence, a request for indulgence of one's perceived needs.

Doi says,

"The psychological prototype of 'amae' lies in the psychology of the infant in its relationship to its mother; not a newborn infant, but an infant who has already realised that its mother exists independently of itself ... [A]s its mind develops it gradually realises that itself and its mother are independent existences, and comes to feel the mother as something indispensable to itself, it is the craving for close contact thus developed that constitutes, one might say, amae."

According to Doi and others, in Japan the kind of relationship based on this prototype provides a model of human relationships in general, especially (though not exclusively) when one person is senior to another. As another writer puts it:

"He may be your father or your older brother or sister ... But he may just as well be your section head at the office, the leader of your local political faction, or simply a fellow struggler down life's byways who happened to be one or two years ahead of you at school or the university. The amae syndrome is pervasive in Japanese life."

Amae may also be used to describe the behavior of a husband who comes home drunk and depends on his wife to get him ready for bed. In Japan, amae does have a connotation of immaturity, but it is also recognized as a key ingredient in loving relationships, perhaps more so than the notions of romance so common in the West.

=== Reception ===
Doi's work has been heavily criticized by academics specializing in nihonjinron studies as being anecdotal and full of inaccuracies. (See Dale, P. 1986 The Myth of Japanese Uniqueness, Mouer and Sugimoto 1986, 1982, Kubota 1999)

Doi's work has been hailed as a distinctive contribution to psychoanalysis by the American psychiatrist Frank Johnson, who has devoted a full book-length study to Doi and to his critics.

== Publication history ==
The Anatomy of Dependence was originally published in Japanese in 1971, and an English translation by John Bester was later published in 1973.

== See also ==
- Attachment theory
- Codependency
- Maslow's hierarchy of needs
- Nihonjinron
