= Japanese Society (book) =

1970 book by Nakane Chie

- Author: Chie Nakane
- Language: English
- Genre: Sociology, Anthropology
- Publisher: Pelican
- Publication date: 1970
- Publication place: Japan
- Media type: Print (Paperback)
- Pages: 162
- ISBN: 978-0-14-021682-0
- OCLC: 1023276
- Dewey Decimal: 309.1/52/04
- LC Class: HN723 .N31513 1973

Japanese Society is an analysis of the structure of Japanese society, written by Chie Nakane and published in 1970. The main theme of the book is the working of what Nakane calls "the vertical principle" in Japanese society, which is a series of social relations between two individuals, one of whom is senior and one of whom is junior.

Nakane also formulates the criteria of "attribute" and "frame" to illuminate that way that groups are formed in Japan, and to compare Japan with other countries. Her thesis is that "frame", which is circumstantial and may be "a locality, an institution or a particular relationship which binds a set of individuals into one group", is more important in Japan than "attribute", "which may be acquired not only by birth but by achievement", examples of which include "a definite descent group or caste". This situation is contrasted with India.

== See also ==
- In-group
- Social psychology
