= Chie Nakane =

Japanese anthropologist (1926–2021)

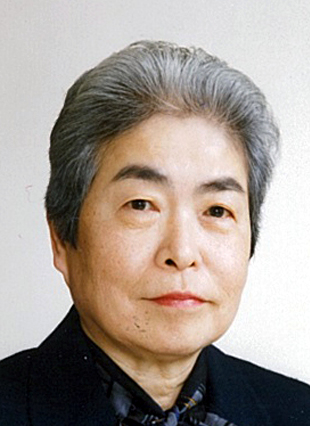
- Chie Nakane
- Born: November 30, 1926; Tokyo, Japan
- Died: October 12, 2021 (aged 94); Tokyo, Japan
- Occupations: author and anthropologist, Professor Emerita at Tokyo University
- Writing career
- Genre: Social anthropology
- Subjects: Societies of India, Tibet, Okinawa and Japan, Human relations in a vertical society
- Notable awards: Order of Culture, 2001; Medals of Honor (Japan) Purple ribbon, 1990

Chie Nakane (中根 千枝, Nakane Chie; November 30, 1926 – October 12, 2021) was a Japanese anthropologist and Professor Emerita of Social Anthropology at the University of Tokyo.

== Education and career ==
Nakane was born in Tokyo and spent her teenage years in Beijing. She graduated from Tsuda College in 1947 and then completed her graduate work specializing in China and Tibet at the University of Tokyo in 1952. In 1953–1957, she did fieldwork in India and studied in the London School of Economics. Nakane served as visiting professor in the Department of Anthropology at the University of Chicago at the invitation of Sol Tax from 1959 to 1960 and as Visiting Lecturer in the School of Oriental and African Studies at the University of London at the invitation of Christoph von Furer-Haimendorf in 1960–1961.

In 1970, Nakane became the first female professor at the University of Tokyo, where she served as Director of the Institute of Oriental Culture from 1980 to 1982. She was also Professor at Osaka University and the National Museum of Ethnology and visiting professor at Cornell University from 1975 to 1980. Nakane retired from the University of Tokyo in 1987. In 1995, she became the first and only female member of the Japan Academy. She was also an honorary member of the Royal Anthropological Institute of Great Britain and Ireland.

== Japan as Vertical Society ==
Nakane's work focuses on cross-cultural comparisons of social structures in Asia, notably Japan, India, and China. She is internationally known for her bestselling book, Japanese Society, which has been translated into 13 languages. In this book, Nakane characterizes Japan as "a vertical society" where human relations are based on "place" (shared space) instead of "attribute" (qualification).

== Publications ==
=== Books ===
- Nakane, C. (1967). Kinship and economic organization in rural Japan. London: Athlone Press.
- Nakane, C. (1970). Japanese society. Berkeley, CA: University of California Press.
- Nakane, C. (1972). Human relations in Japan: Summary translation of “Tateshakai no Ningen Kankei.” Tokyo: Ministry of Foreign Affairs, Japan.
- Nakane, C., & Chiao, C. (Eds.). (1992). Home bound: Studies in East Asian society—Papers presented at the symposium in honor of the 80th birthday of Professor Fei Xiaotong. Tokyo: Center for East Asian Cultural Studies and Toyo Bunko.
- Nakane, C., & Oishi, S. (Eds.). (1990). Tokugawa Japan: The social and economic antecedents of modern Japan. Tokyo: University of Tokyo Press.

=== Articles ===
- Nakane, C. (1964). Logic and the smile: When Japanese meet Indians. Japan Quarterly, 11(4), 434–438.
- Nakane, C. (1965). Towards a theory of Japanese social structure: A unilateral society. The Economic Weekly, 17(5–7), 197–216.
- Nakane, C. (1972). Social background of Japanese in Southeast Asia. The Developing Economics, 10(2), 115–125.
- Nakane, C. (1974). Cultural anthropology in Japan. Annual Review of Anthropology, 3, 57–72.
- Nakane, C. (1975). A cross-cultural look at organizational behavior with particular attention to the difference between Japan and the United States. Linguistic Communications, 15, 95–106.
- Nakane, C. (1975). Fieldwork in India: A Japanese experience. In A. Beteille & T. N. Madan (Eds.), Encounter and experience: Personal accounts of fieldwork (pp. 13–26). Honolulu, HI: University of Hawaii Press.
- Nakane, C. (1982). The effect of cultural tradition on anthropologists. In H. M. Fahim (Ed.), Indigenous anthropology in non-Western countries: Proceedings of a Burg Wartenstein symposium (pp. 52–60). Durham, NC: Carolina Academic Press.

== Honors ==
- Elected to the American Philosophical Society, 1977.
- Medals of Honor (Japan) Purple ribbon, 1990.
- Order of Culture, 2001.
