= Takeo Doi =

Japanese psychoanalyst and author (1920–2009)

- 土居 健郎
- Born: March 17, 1920; Tokyo, Japan
- Died: July 5, 2009 (aged 89)
- Occupations: Academic, psychoanalyst, author
- Notable work: The Anatomy of Dependence

Takeo Doi (土居 健郎, Doi Takeo; March 17, 1920 – July 5, 2009) was a Japanese academic, psychoanalyst and author.

== Early life ==
Doi was born in Tokyo, Japan in 1920. He was a graduate of the University of Tokyo.

== Career ==
Doi was Professor Emeritus in the Department of Neuropsychiatry at the University of Tokyo and a medical adviser to St. Luke's International Hospital in Tokyo. He was also Director of the National Institute of Mental Health in Japan. He taught at the University of Tokyo (1971-1980) and at International Christian University (1980-1982). He wrote numerous books and articles both in Japanese and in English.

Doi was best known for his influential explanation of contemporary Japanese society in the work The Anatomy of Dependence, published in 1971, which focused extensively on amae—inner feelings and behaviors that show individual's innate desires to be understood and taken care of—as a psychoanalytical concept and theory. The Anatomy of Dependence was described by Harvard professor emeritus Ezra Vogel as "the first book by a Japanese trained in psychiatry to have an impact on Western psychiatric thinking." His work has been categorized as nihonjinron.

In 1986, Doi published a further book, The Anatomy of Self, that expanded on his previous analysis of the concept of amae by a deeper examination of the distinctions between honne and tatemae (inner feelings and public display); uchi (home) and soto (outside); and omote (front) and ura (rear) and suggests that these constructs are important for understanding the Japanese psyche as well as Japanese society.

Doi died aged 89 in 2009.

== Publications ==
- Doi, T. (1956). Japanese language as an expression of Japanese psychology. Western Speech, 20(2), 90-96.
- Doi, T. (1967). Giri-ninjo: An interpretation. In R. P. Dore (Ed.), Aspects of social change in modern Japan (pp. 327–336). Princeton, NJ: Princeton University Press.
- Doi, T. (1973). Omote and ura: Concepts derived from the Japanese two-fold structure of consciousness. Journal of Nervous and Mental Disease, 157(4), 258-261.
- Doi, T. (1973). The anatomy of dependence: The key analysis of Japanese behavior (J. Bester, Trans.). Tokyo: Kodansha International.
- Doi, T. (1973). The Japanese patterns of communication and the concept of amae. Quarterly Journal of Speech, 59(2), 180-185.
- Doi, T. (1976). The psychological world of Natsume Soseki (W. J. Taylor, Trans.). Cambridge, MA: East Asian Research Center, Harvard University.
- Doi, T. (1986). Amae: A key concept for understanding Japanese personality structure. In T. S. Lebra & W. P. Lebra (Eds.), Japanese culture and behavior: Selected readings (Rev. ed., pp. 121–129). Honolulu, HI: University of Hawaii Press.
- Doi, T. (1986). The anatomy of self: The individual versus society (M. A. Harbison, Trans.). Tokyo: Kodansha International.
- Doi, T. (1989). The concept of amae and its psychoanalytic implications. International Review of Psycho-Analysis, 16, 349-354.
- Doi, T. (2005). Understanding amae: The Japanese concept of need-love. Kent, UK: Global Oriental.

== See also ==
- Amae
- Honne and tatemae
- Kuki Shūzō
- Nihonjinron
