= Karel van Wolferen =

Dutch journalist, writer and professor (born 1941)

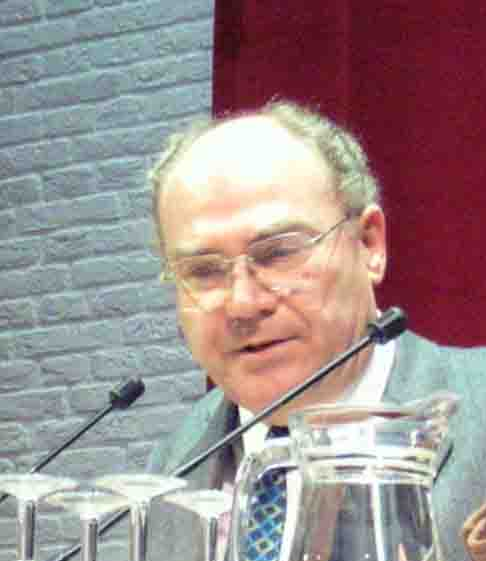
- Karel van Wolferen in 2005.
- Born: 1941 (age 84–85)
- Occupations: Journalist, writer, professor
- Known for: Expertise in Japanese politics, economics, history, and culture

Karel van Wolferen (born 1941) is a Dutch journalist, writer and professor, who is particularly recognised for his knowledge of Japanese politics, economics, history and culture.

== Career as journalist, writer and academic ==
After finishing high school, he traveled to the Middle East, India and South East Asia, and from 1962 to the 1990s, he was based in Japan. In 1972, he became a correspondent for the authoritative Dutch daily NRC Handelsblad, reporting from many countries in Asia. In 1987, he received the highest Dutch award for journalism for his articles on the People Power Revolution of 1986 in the Philippines (an uprising that forced President Ferdinand Marcos to flee the country).

His book writing career began in 1969, when he was commissioned to do a study on student radicalism in the West. The result was published as Student Revolutionaries of the Sixties, reviewed by the International Herald Tribune as "the best introduction to the subject".

After a career as foreign correspondent, he wrote The Enigma of Japanese Power, first published in 1989, which has sold well over 650,000 copies in 11 languages. In Japan this book received enormous attention. The Asahi Shimbun called it "an elaborate and persuasive study, sharply and careful analyzing a multitude of aspects of Japanese reality". The Financial Times wrote, "This most thoughtful of books works because it is serious, well informed and, above all, objective".

Since writing Enigma, van Wolferen has authored more than 15 books published in Japanese that explore details of political, economic, social and historical aspects of the Japanese power system. His books have sold more than one million copies altogether. His analyses and policy suggestions have influenced Japanese critics and policymakers, including the reformist politicians who emerged after the election upset in 1993. Some of the same politicians now form the core of the Democratic Party of Japan that won elections in 2009.

He was made University Professor of Comparative Political and Economic Institutions at the University of Amsterdam in 1997. Since then he has continued to write books and articles for Japanese readers. He divides his time between East Asia and the Netherlands.

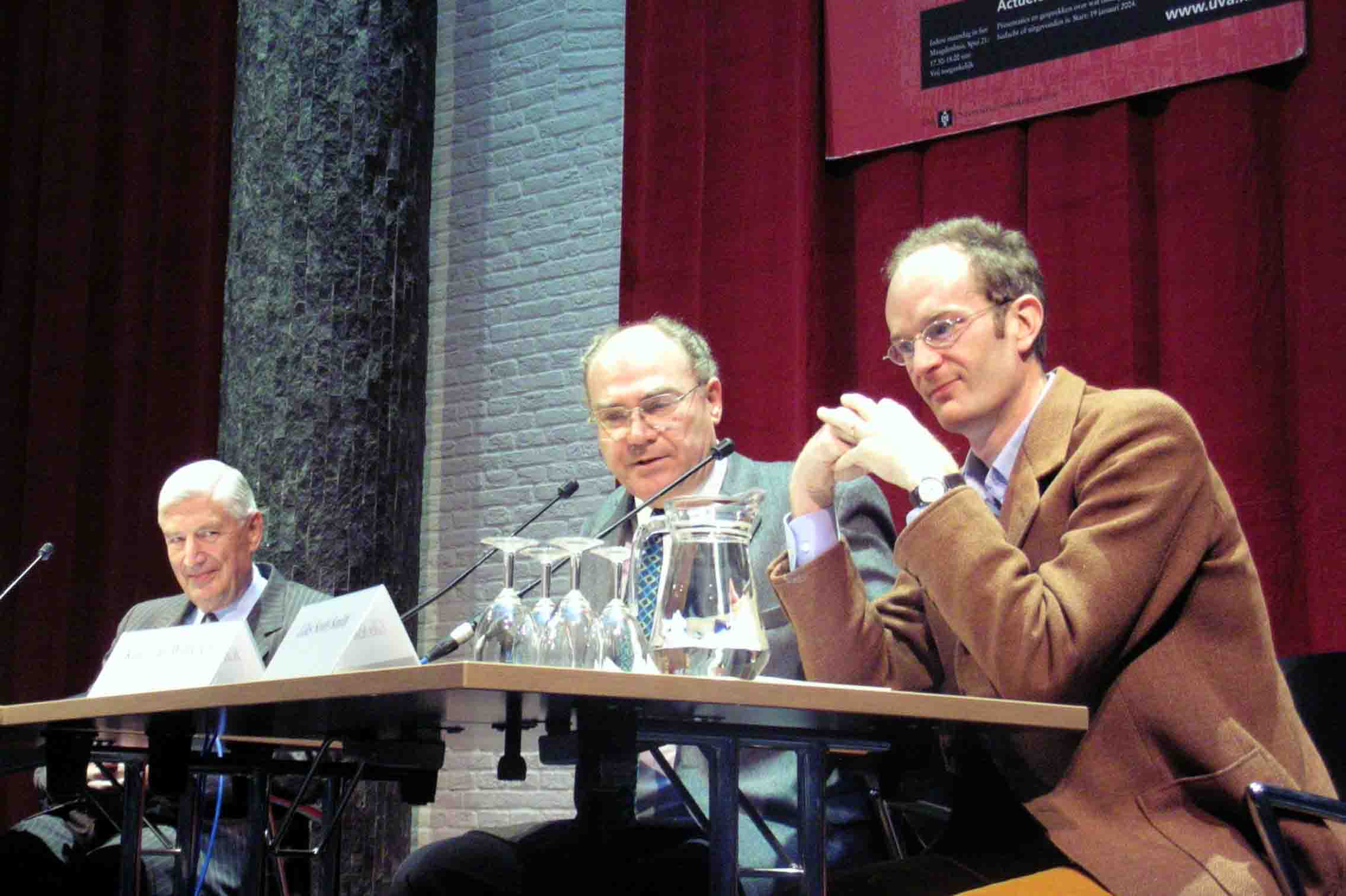
Presentation of Een keerpunt in de vaderlandse geschiedenis at the University of Amsterdam (left to right: former PM Dries van Agt, author Karel van Wolferen and political researcher Giles Scott-Smith).

In 2005, together with NRC Handelsblad reporter Jan Sampiemon, Van Wolferen wrote Een keerpunt in de vaderlandse geschiedenis (Dutch: "A turning point in the history of the fatherland"). Its secondary title is "A manifesto to the Dutch people".

Despite the 'fatherland' in the title referring to the Netherlands, the book is mostly about the changes in the foreign policies of the United States since the presidency of George W. Bush and its effects on the Atlantic Alliance.

== Political views since the 1990s ==
Van Wolferen rejects the global political role of the US since the 1990s and criticizes, particularly in the Russo-Ukrainian War, both the lack of objectivity and independence of European countries and the coordination of the media in their adaptation to the political objectives of the United States.

Van Wolferen believes the terror attacks on 9-11 and MH17 were false flag attacks and believes Architects & Engineers for 9/11 Truth and globalresearch tell the truth on these topics. He also believes the official clarifications about 7 July 2005 London bombings and Charlie Hebdo are polluted with misinformation.

In 2020 Van Wolferen founded conspiracy newspaper Gezond Verstand (Common Sense), which among others claimed the COVID epidemic was fabricated. The University of Amsterdam officially distanced itself from their former employee after its publication, citing Van Wolferen was "ruining the trust in scientific research and the spread of factual information, for example when it comes to Corona." Van Wolferen claimed journalists accusing him of spreading conspiracies are "executing orders from the CIA".

== Published books ==
- Student Revolutionaries of the Sixties – 1970, Oost-West Publishing
- Van Eyck to Brueghel, the Renaissance of the North – 1970, Tudor Publishing Company
- Ooggetuigenverslag van een Wonderbaarlijke Omwenteling: De revolutie van Marcos tot Aquino

Translated Dutch title: Eyewitness Account of a Remarkable Turn: The Revolution from Marcos to Aquino – 1987, NRC Handelsblad

- Nihon / kenryoku-kōzō no nazo – 1990, Hayakawa Shobō (Japanese translation by Masaru Shinohara)

English title: The Enigma of Japanese Power – 1989, Alfred A. Knopf

- Nihon wo dō suru!? Akirameru mae ni, 144 no gimon

Translated Japanese title: What to do with Japan!? Before giving up, examining 144 issues – 1991, Hayakawa Shobō (Japanese translation by Masaru Shinohara)

- Tami wa oroka ni tamote - Nihon kanryō, daishinbun no honne

English title: Keeping the People Ignorant: The Hidden Agenda of Japanese Bureaucrats and News Papers – 1994, Shōgakukan (Japanese translation by Masaru Shinohara)

- Ningen wo kōfuku ni shinai Nihon to iu shisutemu

English title: The False Realities of a Politicized Society – 1994, Mainichi Shinbun Sha (Japanese translation by Masaru Shinohara)

- Nihon no chishikijin e

English title: To the Japanese intellectuals – 1995, Mado Sha (Japanese translation by Hiroshi Nishioka, Yasuo Nakamura and Masaru Shinohara)

- Shihaisha wo shihai seyo - senkyō / senkyōgo

English title: How to Control Japanese Power Holders; The Election and What Comes After It – 1996, Mainichi Shinbun Sha (Japanese translation by Susumu Ōhara)

- Naze nihonjin wa nihon wo ai senai no ka - Kono fukō na kuni no yukue

English title: Why Can’t the Japanese Love Japan? The Direction this Unhappy Country is headed – 1998, Mainichi Shinbun Sha (Japanese translation by Susumu Ōhara)

- Okore! Nihon no Chūryūkaikyū

English title: Bourgeoisie - The Missing Element in Japanese Political Culture – 1999, Mainichi Shinbun Sha (Japanese translation by Chikara Suzuki)

- Amerika wo shiawase ni shi, sekai wo fukō ni suru fujōri na shikumi

Translated Japanese title: The absurd system that makes the United States happy and the rest of the world miserable – 2000, Daiyamondo Sha (Japanese translation by

Norimasa Fukushima)

- Nihon to iu kuni wo anata no mono ni suru tame ni

English title: Can Japanese People Control Their Own Fate? – 2001, Kadokawa Shoten (Japanese translation by Kiyomi Fujii)

- Kaiketsu Wolferen no nihon-waido-gekijō

English title: Japanese Kaleidoscope – 2001, Prejidento Sha (Japanese translation by Kiyomi Fujii)

- Worufuren kyōju no yasashii nihonkeizai

Translated Japanese title: Japanese Economics Made Easy with Professor Van Wolferen – 2002, Daiyamondo Sha (Japanese translation by Kiyomi Fujii)

- Bushu / Sekai wo kowashita kenryoku no jijitsu

English title: George W. Bush and the Destruction of World Order – 2003, PHP Kenkyūsho (Japanese translation by Kiyomi Fujii)

- Amerika kara no dokuritsu ga nihonjin wo shiawase ni suru

English title: Genuine Japanese Independence - A Necessity! – 2003, Jitsugyo no Nihon Sha

- Sekai no ashita ga kessuru hi - beidaitōryō-sengo no sekai wa dō naru no ka?

English title: The Day When the Future of the World will be Decided - How the Outcome of the United States Presidential Election will Shape the World – 2004, Kadokawa

Shoten (Japanese translation by Junko Kawakami)

- Sekai ga nihon wo mitomeru hi - Mō amerika no zokkoku de iru hitsuyō wa nai

English title: The Day that the World Can Take Japan Seriously Again – Japan no longer needs to be an American dependency – 2005, PHP Kenkyūsho (Japanese

translation by Kiyomi Fujii)

- Nenshū sanbyaku manen - Nihonjin no tame no kōfukuron (in collaboration with Takuro Morinaga)

Translated Japanese title: The age of the 3 million yen annual income - A discussion on how the Japanese people can attain happiness – 2005, Daiyamondo Sha

- Een Keerpunt in de Vaderlandse Geschiedenis (in collaboration with Jan Sampiemon)

Translated Dutch title: A Turning-Point in National History – 2005, J.M. Meulenhoff – Amsterdam

- Japan shisutemu no gisō to hakai - Shiawase wo ubawareta “hatarakiari-kokka”-nihon (in collaboration with Benjamin Fulford)

Translated Japanese title: The Deceit and Destruction of the System called Japan - A Nation of Worker Ants deprived of Happiness – 2006, Tokuma Shoten

- Mō hitotsu no sakoku - Nihon wa sekai de koritsu suru

English title: Sakoku by other means - Japan will become isolated from the world – 2006, Kadokawa Shoten (Japanese translation by Minoru Inoue)

- Nihonjin dake ga shiranai amerika no sekaishihai no owari

English title: The end of American Hegemony – 2007, Tokuma Shoten (Japanese translation by Minoru Inoue)

- Amerika to tomo ni shizumiyuku jiyūsekai

English title: America’s Tragedy and the Blind Free World – 2010, Tokuma Shoten (Japanese translation by Minoru Inoue)

- Dare ga Ozawa Ichirō wo korosu no ka? – Kakusakusha naki inbō

English title: The Character Assassination of Ozawa Ichiro – 2011, Kadokawa Shoten (Japanese translation by Minoru Inoue)

- Kono kuni wa mada daijōbu ka? (in collaboration with Eiji Ōshita)

Translated Japanese title: Has this country lost its marbles? – 2012, Seishi Sha

- Nihon wo oikomu itsutsu no wana

English title: The Five Traps Surrounding Japan – 2012, Kadokawa Shoten (Japanese translation by Minoru Inoue)

- Jinbutsu-hakai - Dare ga Ozawa Ichirō wo korosu no ka?

English title: The Character Assassination of Osawa Ichiro (Edited and supplemented reprint of the 2011 original edition) – 2012, Kadokawa Shoten (Japanese translation by

Minoru Inoue)

- Imada ningen wo kōfuku ni shinai Nihon to iu shisutemu

English title: The False Realities of a Politicized Society (Edited, supplemented and retranslated reprint of the 1994 original edition) – 2012, Kadokawa Sofia Bunko (Japanese

translation by Minoru Inoue)

- Dokuritsu no shikō - Amerika wa nihon wo mamotte kurenai (in collaboration with Ukeru Magosaki)

Translated Japanese title: Contemplating on independence - The United States doesn’t protect Japan – 2013, Kadokawa Gakugei Shuppan

- Nihon ni sukū yottsu no kaibutsu

English title: Political Monsters in and around Abe’s Japan – 2014, Kadokawa Gakugei Shuppan (Japanese translation by Minoru Inoue)

- Itsuwari no sengo-nihon (in collaboration with Satoshi Shirai)

English title: Fake Post-war of Japan – 2014, Kadokawa Gakugei Shuppan

== See also ==
- The Enigma of Japanese Power
