= Raymond J. DeMallie =

American anthropologist (1946–2021)

Raymond J. DeMallie (October 16, 1946 – April 25, 2021) was an American anthropologist whose work focuses on the cultural history of the peoples of the Northern Plains, particularly the Lakota. His work is informed by interrelated archival, museum-based, and ethnographic research in a manner characteristic of the ethnohistorical method. In 1985 he founded and became the director of the American Indian Studies Research Institute at Indiana University Bloomington, alongside Douglas Parks, whom he worked collaboratively throughout majority of his career to preserve and translate various Indigenous languages, after having first met in 1980. Shortly after Parks started to work with DeMallie at Indiana University Bloomington. They got married in 2016.

== Early life and education ==
Raymond DeMallie was born in 1946 and raised in Rochester, New York. In 1964, in his last year of high school, he attended the Lewis Henry Morgan Lectures at the University of Rochester, given by Fred Eggan of the University of Chicago.

This inspired DeMallie's decision to attend the University of Chicago for undergraduate and graduate work; Eggan would eventually serve as the chair of his dissertation committee. Other influential teachers at Chicago included Sol Tax (with whom he worked as a member of the staff of Current Anthropology), George Stocking, Ray Fogelson, and David Schneider.

DeMallie's dissertation fieldwork on the Cheyenne River Indian Reservation focused on kinship and social organization. DeMallie drew from both cultural and linguistic data, and he received his PhD in 1971. (He earned his B.A. with honors in 1968 and his M.A. in 1970, with the Department of Anthropology throughout his education at Chicago.)

== Career ==
DeMallie was a member of the University of Wyoming's Department of Anthropology from 1972 to 1973.

In 1973 he joined Indiana University's Anthropology Department, which allowed him to work with the department's founder, Carl Voegelin. In 1985 DeMallie founded and became the director of the American Indian Studies Research Institute at Indiana University. The Institute collaborates with tribes to document endangered native languages and develop materials to teach the languages, many of which are being revived in tribal schools and colleges. On the Indiana faculty, Professor DeMallie was also the Class of 1967 Chancellor's Professor of Anthropology and American Studies.

During his career at Indiana, DeMallie trained a significant number of scholars who have taken up research and teaching posts in several fields concerned with Native North American studies. These include Brenda Farnell, Paula Wagoner, Mindy J. Morgan, Jason Baird Jackson, and Carolyn Anderson.

DeMallie was active in professional associations; in 1991–1992, he was elected as president of the American Society for Ethnohistory.

== Legacy and honors ==
- In 2002–2003, he was the French-American Foundation Chair in American Civilization at the École des Hautes Études en Sciences Sociales in Paris.

== Representative works ==
=== Articles ===
- DeMallie, Raymond J. (November 1982), "The Lakota Ghost Dance: An Ethnohistorical Account", The Pacific Historical Review, 51 (4): 385–405, doi:10.2307/3639782, ISSN 0030-8684, JSTOR 3639782
- DeMallie, Raymond J. (2001), "Procrustes and the Sioux: David M. Schneider and the Study of Sioux Kinship", in Feinberg, Richard; Ottenheimer, Martin (eds.), The Cultural Analysis of Kinship: The Legacy of David M. Schneider, Urbana: University of Illinois Press, pp. 46–59, hdl:2027/spo.bbk4552.0001.001, OCLC 45784204
- DeMallie, Raymond J. (2004), "Tutelo and Neighboring Groups", in Fogelson, Raymond D. (ed.), Handbook of North American Indians, Vol. 14: Southeast, Washington, DC: Smithsonian Institution, pp. 286–300, ISBN 0-16-072300-0
- DeMallie, Raymond J. (2006), "The Sioux at the Time of European Contact: An Ethnohistorical Problem", in Strong, Pauline Turner; Kan, Sergei (eds.), New Perspectives on Native North America: Cultures, Histories, and Representations, Lincoln: University of Nebraska Press, pp. 239–260, OCLC 61454015

=== Books ===
- Neihardt, John Gneisenau; Black Elk (1984), DeMallie, Raymond J. (ed.), The Sixth Grandfather: Black Elk's Teachings Given to John G. Neihardt, Lincoln: University of Nebraska Press, OCLC 9762083
- DeMallie, Raymond J.; Parks, Douglas R., eds. (1987), Sioux Indian Religion: Tradition and Innovation, Norman: University of Oklahoma Press, OCLC 15055139, archived from the original on 2015-09-24
- DeMallie, Raymond J. (1994), "Kinship and Biology in Sioux Culture", in DeMallie, Raymond J.; Ortiz, Alonso (eds.), North American Indian Anthropology: Essays on Society and Culture, Norman: University of Oklahoma Press, pp. 125–146, OCLC 30594282
- DeMallie, Raymond J., ed. (2001), Handbook of North American Indians, Vol. 13: Plains, Washington, DC: Smithsonian Institution, OCLC 48209643
- Deloria, Ella Cara (2022), DeMallie, Raymond J.; Veyrié, Thierry (eds.), The Dakota Way of Life, Lincoln, Nebraska: University of Nebraska Press, OCLC 1347696748
