= Erika Bourguignon =

Austrian-American anthropologist and university teacher (1924-2015)

Erika Eichhorn Bourguignon
- Born: Erika Eichhorn; February 18, 1924; Vienna, Austria
- Died: February 15, 2015 (aged 90)
- Known for: Her work in the anthropology of altered states of consciousness, possession trance, religious syncretism, Haitian Vodou
- Spouse: Paul-Henri Bourguignon (m. 1950)
- Awards: Doctor of Humane Letters, honoris causa from Queens College (2000)

Academic background
- Education: Queens College, City University of New York (B.A.), Northwestern University (Graduate Studies)
- Academic advisors: Melville J. Herskovits, Alfred Irving Hallowell

Academic work
- Discipline: Anthropology
- Sub-discipline: Altered states of consciousness, Possession trance
- Institutions: Ohio State University

Erika Eichhorn Bourguignon (February 18, 1924 – February 15, 2015) was an Austrian-born American anthropologist known primarily for her work on possession trance and other altered states of consciousness. She was “considered the premier anthropological authority on trance, possession, and altered states of consciousness” and "one of the founders of the field of anthropology of consciousness." She was born in Vienna, Austria, but left with her parents in 1938. After receiving a B.A. from Queens College in 1945, she began graduate studies at Northwestern University, working there under Melville J. Herskovits and Alfred Irving Hallowell. She did field research among the Chippewa in Wisconsin and in Haiti (1947–48).

After returning from Haiti, Bourguignon joined the faculty of Ohio State University in Columbus, Ohio, where she taught for more than 40 years. From 1971 to 1976 she served as Chair of The Ohio State's Anthropology Department. Throughout her career she was an active member in several academic organizations, and was especially prominent in the Society for Psychological Anthropology and the Central States Anthropological Society. She pursued many academic and other interests including creating a weekly radio show on world music, co-founding a women-in-development seminar, and serving as the first chair of Ohio State's Council on Academic Excellence for Women. Bourguignon received a Doctor of Humane Letters, honoris causa, from Queens College, CUNY, in 2000.

== Early life ==
=== Childhood ===
Erika Bourguignon was born Erika Eichhorn in Vienna, Austria, on February 18, 1924, to Jewish parents Leopold H. and Charlotte (Rosenbaum) Eichhorn. In March 1938, when Erika was 14, Nazi Germany annexed Austria, and in the summer of 1938 Erika and her parents left Austria. In Switzerland, Leopold and Charlotte settled in Zurich, while Erika attended a boarding school in the Rhone Valley The following year the family obtained visas to emigrate to the United States and arrived in New York City in October, 1939.

=== College and marriage ===
Bourguignon attended Queens College, City University of New York, where she took classes with the anthropologist Hortense Powdermaker. Upon graduating from Queens in 1945, she entered graduate school at Northwestern University and studied anthropology under Melville Herskovits. While conducting anthropological fieldwork in Haiti, Bourguignon met her future husband, Belgian artist and writer Paul-Henri Bourguignon, on assignment there for the Belgian newspaper Le Phare. During his 15-month stay in Haiti, Paul-Henri took hundreds of photographs of Haiti and Haitians, many of which Erika later used in her books and other publications about Haiti. Erika and Paul were married on September 29, 1950, after she had returned from Haiti and he from an assignment in Peru.

== Career in anthropology ==
=== Early career ===
After returning from Haiti, Bourguignon began teaching at The Ohio State University. In 1956 she moved from assistant to associate professor, and in 1960 to full professor. From 1963 to 1968 Bourguignon directed the “Cross-Cultural Study of Dissociational States.” She published the report of the outcome of this project in 1973, in Religion, Altered States of Consciousness, and Social Change.

=== 1970–1990 ===
From 1970 through 1990 much of Bourguignon's academic work sprang from her fieldwork in Haiti, where her primary interest had been possession trance, a culturally sanctioned part of the Haitian Vodou religion. In addition to possession trance, Bourguignon also wrote about additional altered states of consciousness, including dreams, dreaming and multiple-personality disorder. Altered states of consciousness unsanctioned by the societies in which they are found are often (but not always) considered mental illness, and Bourguignon was interested in these as well, and thus in cross-cultural psychiatry.

Bourguignon's long-term interest in the study of religion also seemed to spring from her 1947-48 field research. Possession trance was an accepted part of the Haitian vodou religion. During her academic career Bourguignon would write hundreds of articles, reviews, and books including about “religious syncretism among new world negroes” (1967), and “religion and justice in Haitian vodoun” (1985). Her interest in women's studies too can be seen as emanating from her Haitian work. Most Haitians exhibiting possession trance are women, and in the 1980s Bourguignon would edit and publish A World of Women: Anthropological Studies of Women in the Societies of the World (1980), and co-publish “Women, Possession Trance Cults, and the Extended Nutrient-Deficiency Hypothesis” (1983). When it was founded in 1979, she would also serve as the first chair of Ohio State's Council on Academic Excellence for Women.

== Later life ==
In 1990, two years after her husband Paul died, Bourguignon retired from university teaching. Even after retiring however, Bourguignon remained active both in academia and in the wider world as well. In 1992 she returned to her birthplace, Vienna, Austria, and wrote about her reactions to the trip in "Vienna and Memory: Anthropology and Experience” (Ethos 24: 374–387). In 1998 she co-authored a book about her aunt Bronka Schneider's escape from Nazi Austria. In 2009 Bourguignon participated in a symposium held by The Ohio State University in her honor, titled “An 85th Birthday Symposium for Erika Bourguignon.” The presentations and discussions centered around Bourguignon's major research interests and contributions: psychological and psychiatric anthropology, the relationship of religious trance to gender roles and social change, religious studies, women's studies, African-American performance studies, holocaust studies and the study of memory in Central Europe. From 1990 until her death, Bourguignon supervised installations of exhibitions of the art work of her late husband, Paul-Henri Bourguignon. In addition to several shows in Columbus and other Ohio locations she exhibited his work in galleries in New York City, Sedona, Arizona, and Santa Fe, New Mexico.

== Anthropological legacy ==
In addition to being considered the foremost anthropological authority on altered states of consciousness, Bourguignon was known "above all for her pioneering work on the relationship of religious trance to gender roles and social change." The anthropologist Melford Spiro has described her as "a preeminent psychological anthropologist as well as the premier anthropological authority on trance, possession and altered states of consciousness." The Paul H. and Erika Bourguignon Lecture Series in Arts and Anthropology is presented every spring and with the support of the Ohio State University Anthropology department and an endowment from Elizabeth A. Salt (M.A., Anthropology, 1975).

== Publications ==
=== Books ===
- 1968. Trance Dance (Dance Perspectives). Dance Perspectives Foundation. New York. (Excerpts reprinted, 1972, in The Highest State of Consciousness, John W. White, editor, New York: Doubleday Anchor Books, pp 331–343). (Reprinted, 2001, in Moving/History/Dancing Cultures: A Dance History Reader, Ann Dils and Ann Cooper Albright, editors, Middletown, CT: Wesleyan University Press, pp 97–102).
- 1973. Editor and contributor. Religion, Altered States of Consciousness and Social Change. Columbus: Ohio State University Press.
- 1973. With Lenora S. Greenbaum. Diversity and Homogeneity in World Societies. HRAF Press.
- 1976. Possession. San Francisco: Chandler & Sharp Publishers. Revised edition 1991.
- 1979. Psychological Anthropology. New York: Holt, Rinehart and Winston. Italian translation 1983.
- 1980. Editor. A World of Women: Anthropological Studies of Women in the Societies of the World. New York: Praeger Publishers.
- 1998. With Barbara Hill Rigney. Exile: A Memoir of 1939: Bronka Schneider. Columbus: Ohio State University Press.
- 2012. With Edward Lense. Via Crucis: The Way of the Cross. Columbus: Igloo Letterpress.

=== Other (selected) publications ===
- 1954. “Dreams and Dream Interpretation in Haiti.” American Anthropologist 56: 262–268.
- 1956. “A Life History of an Ojibwa Young Woman.” In B. Kaplan ed., Microcard Publications of Primary Records in Culture and Personality I. Madison, WI: The Microcard Foundation.
- 1959. “The Persistence of Folk Belief: Some Notes on Cannibalism and Zombis in Haiti.” Journal of American Folklore 72: 36–46.
- 1965. “The Self, the Behavioral Environment and the Theory of Spirit Possession.” In Spiro, ed., 1965, Context and Meaning in Cultural Anthropology. New York: Free Press.
- 1967. “Religious Syncretism among New World Negroes.” In Whitten and Szwed, eds., 1970, Afro-American Anthropology: Contemporary Perspectives. New York: Free Press, pp 36–38.
- 1968. “World Distribution and Patterns of Possession States.” In R. Prince, ed., Trance and Possession States. Montreal: R.M. Bucke Memorial Society.
- 1969. “Haiti et l’Ambivalence Socialisee: A Reconsideration.” Journal de la Societedes Americanistes 58: 178–205.
- 1972. “Dreams and Altered States of Consciousness in Anthropological Research.” In F. L. K. Hsu, ed., Psychological Anthropology. Cambridge, MA: Schenkman.
- 1973. “Introduction: A Framework for the Comparative Study of Altered States of Consciousness.” In E. Bourguignon, ed., Religion, Altered States of Consciousness and Social Change. Columbus: Ohio State University Press.
- 1975. “Importante Papel de las Mujeres en los Cultos Afroamericanos.” Montalban 4: 423–38.
- 1977. With T.L. Evascu. “Altered States of Consciousness Within a General Evolutionary Perspective: A Holocultural Analysis.” Behavior Science Research 12: 197–216.
- 1983. “Women, Possession Trance Cults, and the Extended Nutrient-Deficiency Hypothesis.” With Anna McCabe and Susan McCabe. American Anthropologist 85: 413–416.
- 1985. “Religion and Justice in Haitian Vodoun.” Phylon 46: 292–295.
- 1989. “Multiple Personality, Possession Trance, and the Psychic Unity of Mankind.” Ethos 17: 371–384.
- 1991. “Hortense Powdermaker, the Teacher." Journal of Anthropological Research 47: 417–428.
- 1991. “A.I. Hallowell, the Foundations of Psychological Anthropology and Altered States of Consciousness.” Psychoanalytic Study of Society 16: 19–41.
- 1995. “Possession and Social Change in Eastern Africa: Introduction.” Anthropological Quarterly 68: 71–74.
- 1996. “Vienna and Memory: Anthropology and Experience” Ethos 24: 374–387.
- 2003. “Dreams that Speak: Interpretation and Experience.” In Dreaming and the Self: New Perspectives on Subjectivity, Identity and Emotion. J.M. Mageo, Ed. Albany: SUNY Press. pp 133–154.
- 2004. “Haiti and the Art of Paul Bourguignon.” Research in African Literatures 35: 173–188.
- 2013. “The Painter's Eye: Paul-Henri Bourguignon's Haitian Photographs.” American Imago 70: 357–383.

== Bibliography ==
- Bourguignon, Erika. 2004. “Haiti and the Art of Paul-Henri Bourguignon.” Research in African Literatures 35: 173–188.
- Bourguignon, Erika. 1973. With Lenora S. Greenbaum. Diversity and Homogeneity in World Societies. HRAF Press.
- “Bourguignon, Erika Eichhorn.” 2003. In Who’s Who in the Midwest. New Providence NJ: Marquis. pp. 63–64.
- “Bourguignon, Erika Eichhorn”. 2013. In Who's Who in America.
- Glazier, Stephen D. 2004. “Bourguignon, Erika.” In Biographical Dictionary of Social and Cultural Anthropology.
- Mann, Melanie. 2009. "Mirrors and Compasses: An 85th Birthday Symposium

for Erika Bourguignon". Columbus: Ohio State University, Mershon Center for International Security Studies.

- “Mirrors and Compasses: An 85th Birthday Symposium for Erika Bourguignon.” Friday, February 20, 2009. Columbus: Center for Folklore Studies, OSU.
- Rich, Grant Jewell. 1999. “Erika Bourguignon: A Portrait of the Anthropology of Consciousness.” Anthropology of Consciousness 10: 50–58.
- “Sixth Annual Status Report of Women at The Ohio State University.” 1994. Columbus, Ohio: The Council on Academic Excellence for Women
- “Through the Lens.” 2012. Ascent, the Magazine of the Ohio State University College of Arts and Sciences. Spring, 2012.
