= Raymond D. Fogelson =

American anthropologist (1933–2020)

Raymond David Fogelson (August 23, 1933 – January 20, 2020) was an American anthropologist known for his research on American Indians of the southeastern United States, especially the Cherokee. He is considered a founder of the subdiscipline of ethnohistory.

== Biography ==
Fogelson was born August 23, 1933, in Red Bank, New Jersey. In 1951, he was admitted to Wesleyan University in the pre-med program, shifting first to psychology and then to anthropology. He received a Master of Arts in 1958 and a Doctor of Philosophy in 1962 from the University of Pennsylvania, where he was influenced by two Americanist anthropologists with strong interests in psychology, Anthony F. C. Wallace and Alfred Irving Hallowell.

Fogelson began fieldwork with the eastern Cherokee in 1956 under the direction of the anthropologist John Gulick; fieldwork with the Oklahoma Cherokee was conducted in 1958 and 1960. In 1960 and 1961, he was a research fellow at the Eastern Pennsylvania Psychiatric Institute.

In 1962, Fogelson began a teaching position at the University of Washington, during which time he did fieldwork among the Shuswap in British Columbia, though fieldwork with Oklahoma Cherokee and Muskogee (Creek) continued through the 1960s. In 1965, he transferred to the University of Chicago, where he continued to teach in the Department of Anthropology until his death.

Fogelson also testified extensively before congressional committees on federal recognition of Indian tribes such as the Lumbee.

In 2006, a volume was published in his honor (New Perspectives on Native North America; see sources), consisting of contributions from many of his former students, including Jeffrey D. Anderson, Mary Druke Becker, Margaret Bender, Robert A. Brightman, Thomas Buckley, Raymond A. Bucko, Raymond J. DeMallie, David Dinwoodie, Frederic W. Gleach, Michael E. Harkin, Joseph C. Jastrzembski, Sergei A. Kan, Robert E. Moore, Larry Nesper, Jean O'Brien, Pauline Turner Strong, Greg Urban, and Barrik Van Winkle. The volume also contains articles by Regna Darnell, Jennifer S. H. Brown, and Peter Nabokov.

== Selected works ==
- (1962) The Cherokee Ball Game: A Study in Southeastern Indian Ethnology. Ph.D. dissertation, Department of Anthropology, University of Pennsylvania.
- (1979) The Cherokees: A Critical Bibliography. Bloomington: Indiana University Press.
- (1980) "Windigo Goes South: Stoneclad among the Cherokees." In: Manlike Monsters on Trial: Early Records and Modern Evidence, ed. by Marjorie M. Halpin and Michael M. Ames, pp. 132–151. Vancouver: University of British Columbia Press.
- (1982) "Person, Self, and Identity: Some Anthropological Retrospects, Circumspects, and Prospects." In: Psychological Theories of the Self, ed. by Benjamin Lee and Kathleen Smith, pp. 67–109. New York: Plenum Press.
- (1985) "Interpretations of the American Indian Psyche: Some Historical Notes." In: Social Contexts of American Ethnology, 1840–1984, ed. by June Helm, pp. 4–27. Washington: American Anthropological Association.
- (1989) "The Ethnohistory of Events and Nonevents." Ethnohistory, vol. 36, no. 2, pp. 133–147.
- (ed.) (2004) Handbook of North American Indians, Volume 14: Southeast. Washington: Smithsonian Institution.
- (ed.) (with Richard N. Adams) (1977) The Anthropology of Power: Studies from Asia, Oceania, and the New World. New York: Academic Press.

== Sources ==
- Kan, Sergei A., and Pauline Turner Strong (2006) Introduction. In: New Perspectives on Native North America: Cultures, Histories, and Representations, pp. xi-xlii. Lincoln: University of Nebraska Press.
