= Anthony F. C. Wallace =

Canadian-American anthropologist (1923–2015)

- Born: Anthony Francis Clarke Wallace; April 15, 1923; Toronto, Canada
- Died: October 5, 2015 (aged 92); Ridley Park, Pennsylvania, US
- Education: University of Pennsylvania
- Awards: Cornplanter Medal (1970); Lifetime Achievement by the Society for Psychological Anthropology (2013)
- Scientific career
- Fields: Anthropology
- Workplaces: Eastern Pennsylvania Psychiatric Institute

Anthony Francis Clarke Wallace (April 15, 1923 – October 5, 2015) was a Canadian-American anthropologist who specialized in Native American cultures, especially the Haudenosaunee. His research expressed an interest in the intersection of cultural anthropology and psychology. He was famous for the theory of revitalization movements.

== Early life and education ==
Wallace was born in Toronto, Ontario, on April 15, 1923, the son of the historian Paul Wallace and his wife, a British national. After attending school in Annville, Pennsylvania, he enrolled into Lebanon Valley College, in 1941, where he studied French-Canadian folklore, and later, the oral literature of the Haudenosaunee and Lenape. A year later, Wallace joined the Army Specialized Training Program at the University of Cincinnati, and studied electrical engineering there for one year. In October 1944, he was assigned to the 14th Armored Division in Southern France where he remained until the end of the war in 1945.

After the war, Wallace returned to his studies and earned his Bachelor of Arts in history in 1947, and an Master of Arts and Doctor of Philosophy in anthropology, in 1949 and 1950, respectively, both from the University of Pennsylvania. It was during 1947 studies, when he published his first article entitled "Woman, Land, and Society: Three Aspects of Aboriginal Delaware Life", and following its success, joined the Department of Anthropology after reading The Golden Bough by James George Frazer. During his graduate studies at Penn, Wallace was a student of American ethnologist Frank Speck and when professors Alfred Irving Hallowell, Loren Eiseley, and Ward Goodenough joined the faculty, Wallace became their student too.

For his M.A. in 1949, Wallace wrote a thesis about Teedyuscung titled "A Psychocultural Analysis of the Life of Teedyuscung, a Delaware Indian, 1700-1763", which was published same year under the title King of the Delawares. His PhD thesis was entitled "The Modal Personality Structure of the Tuscarora Indians: As Revealed by the Rorschach Test" that appeared two years later in the Bureau of American Ethnology Bulletin. While completing his PhD, Wallace was already married to Betty, and already had two children, Anthony and Daniel.

== Career ==
Immediately after graduation, Wallace started to receive position offers from University of Wisconsin and Yale, but due to his family ties, turned them down in order to remain in Philadelphia, Pennsylvania. His decision was also justified by the fact that he already was an instructor at Bryn Mawr College, a position that he was thoroughly enjoying. The previously obtained Ph.D., allowed Wallace to hold numerous part-time positions at the University of Pennsylvania where in 1955 he became senior research associate at the Eastern Pennsylvania Psychiatric Institute, at which place he later became the Director of Clinical Research, and served as such until its closure in 1980. From 1955 to 1960, Wallace served as research associate at the institute and visiting associate professor in the Department of Anthropology at Penn, following which, he was appointed director of clinical research at the University of Pennsylvania. A year later, after writing Culture and Personality, he abandoned that position, in order to become full-time professor and chairman of the Department of Anthropology at Penn.

The Cold War, which started around the same time, allowed Wallace to join the National Academy of Sciences Committee which was headed by William N. Fenton, an anthropologist and Haudenosaunee expert, at that time. During his stay with the committee, he was responsible for the study of aftermath of a tornado at Worcester, Massachusetts in 1953. A year prior to it, Wallace already published an article on Native American studies titled "Handsome Lake and the Great Revival in the West" which in 1969 was published as part of his book The Death and Rebirth of the Seneca. His other notable works of that time were the "Mazeway Resynthesis: A Biocultural Theory of Religious Inspiration" and "Mazeway Disintegration" which were published in 1956 and 1957 respectively. At time when he was writing those articles, he wrote a report on tornado studies in Worcester, Massachusetts entitled "Tornado in Worcester: An Exploratory Study of Individual and Community Behavior in an Extreme Situation" which was later published under Rockdale and St. Clair, a precursor of his future career. His last publication in that field was in 1960. Entitled "The Meaning of Kinship Terms", the work was written by him and his colleague, a fellow anthropologist John Atkins.

At age 40, the Wallace family began adopting children from Korea, bringing their family to six. From 1965 to 1966, he taught "Primitive Religion", one of the courses on the Anthropology of Religion. It was during these times when Wallace wrote Religion: An Anthropological View and became a mentor to future anthropologists Raymond D. Fogelson and Richard Bauman. During the late 1960s, Wallace shared an office with fellow anthropologist Greg Urban at the University of Pennsylvania Museum of Archaeology and Anthropology. In 1969, he was elected as a member of the American Philosophical Society.

Around 1971, Wallace, after finishing his term as department chair, he became an author of such books as Rockdale and Saint Clair which were awarded Bancroft and Dexter Prizes in 1987 and 1989 respectively. In 1980, he became the first Geraldine R. Segal Professor in American Social Thought at the University of Pennsylvania, and three years later became Professor of the Department of Anthropology at the same institution. Until his retirement in 1988, Wallace served on the board of the Research Foundation of the university, the Faculty Editorial Committee of the University Press and the Ethnohistory Committee.

== Retirement and death ==
After his retirement in 1988, Wallace returned to the study of Native American culture, writing such books as The Long, Bitter Trail: Andrew Jackson and the Indians in 1992 and Tuscarora: A History in 2013. A decade before the publication, Wallace's wife, Betty had died. He had planned to move to western New York with her so that he would be closer to the Tuscarora Reservation.

Wallace died on October 5, 2015, aged 92, in Ridley Park, Pennsylvania.

== Works ==
- (1949) King of the Delawares: Teedyuscung 1700–1763.
- (1952) The Modal Personality Structure of the Tuscarora Indians, as Revealed by the Rorschach Test, Washington, DC: U.S. Government Printing Office.
- (1961) Culture and Personality, New York: Random House.
- (1966) Religion: An Anthropological View.
- (1969) The Death and Rebirth of the Seneca, with the assistance of Sheila C. Steen, New York: Random House.
- (1978) Rockdale: The Growth of an American Village in the Early Industrial Revolution, New York: Alfred A. Knopf.
- (1982) The Social Context of Innovation, Princeton University Press.
- (1987) Saint Clair: a Nineteenth Century Coal Town's Experience with a Disaster-Prone Industry, New York: Random House; 1988 with corrections, Ithaca, NY, and London: Cornell University Press, ISBN 978-0-8014-9900-5. LCCN n/88/4772.
- (1993) "The Long, Bitter Trail", New York: Hill & Wang.
- (1999) "Jefferson and the Indians: The Tragic Fate of the First Americans", Cambridge, MA: Belknap Press.
- (2012) Tuscarora: A History, Albany, NY: SUNY Press.
- (2013, December) "Commentary: 'Growing Up Indian': Childhood and the Survival of Nations" in Ethos (Journal of the Society for Psychological Anthropology) Volume 41:4, pp. 337–340.

== Sources ==
- Darnell, Regna (2006) "Keeping the Faith: A Legacy of Native American Ethnography, Ethnohistory, and Psychology." In: New Perspectives on Native North America: Cultures, Histories, and Representations, ed. by Sergei A. Kan and Pauline Turner Strong, pp. 3–16. Lincoln: University of Nebraska Press.
- Kan, Sergei A., and Pauline Turner Strong (2006) Introduction. In: New Perspectives on Native North America: Cultures, Histories, and Representations, pp. xi-xlii. Lincoln: University of Nebraska Press.
