= Daniel C. Swan =

American cultural anthropologist and museum curator

Daniel C. Swan is an American cultural anthropologist and museum curator whose work has focused on documenting and interpreting the cultural history of the Americas. He has specialized particularly on the histories, social organizations, and cultures of Native North American peoples in Oklahoma, USA. His research on the history, significance, and artistic forms of the Native American Church has led to research and exhibition collaborations with artists and elders in a diversity of American Indian communities, both in Oklahoma and elsewhere in the Western United States. In addition to his work on American Indian topics, he has organized exhibitions and museum catalogs about cultural diversity in the American West and in the Western Hemisphere more broadly.

== Career ==
Swan is Curator emeritus of Ethnology at the Sam Noble Oklahoma Museum of Natural History (Norman, Oklahoma) where he also served Interim Director for several years prior to retirement. Concurrently, he is a professor of Anthropology emeritus in the Department of Anthropology at the University of Oklahoma. Before returning to the University of Oklahoma in 2007, Swan had served as the Director of the Chucalissa Museum and as an associate professor of anthropology at the University of Memphis, as the Senior Curator at the Gilcrease Museum (Tulsa, Oklahoma), and as Curator of Ethnology at the Science Museum of Minnesota (Minneapolis). He completed his doctorate in anthropology at the University of Oklahoma in 1990 with a dissertation that documented the history of the Native American Church among the Osage people. He has collaborated with the Osage since the early 1980s. Before relocating to Oklahoma for graduate school he earned a B.A. in anthropology from the State University of New York Binghamton (Binghamton University).

== Exhibitions ==
His 1999 exhibition "Symbols of Faith and Belief: The Art of the Native American Church" explored the arts associated with the rituals and beliefs of the Native American Church, a formally organized religion found in a large number of Native American communities in the United States and Canada. The religion is associated with the sacramental use of the peyote cactus (Lophophora williamsii). The exhibition was organized by the Gilcrease Museum and traveled to the Minneapolis Institute of Arts, the Navajo Nation Museum, and the Sam Noble Oklahoma Museum of Natural History. A companion book-Peyote Religious Art: Symbols of Faith and Belief- was published by the University Press of Mississippi.

In addition to numerous museum exhibitions that he has curated at the institutions with which he has been affiliated, Swan was a core contributor to "The Art of the Osage," a major 2004 exhibition of the Saint Louis Art Museum. The exhibition was the first to focus specifically on the rich and complex artistic and cultural traditions of the Osage people. The University of Washington Press published the companion book, for which Swan with the co-author with Garrick Bailey.

In 2009 he completed work on a major project to conserve, interpret, and exhibit a unique pictorial record of Kiowa history compiled by the artist-historian Silver Horn. The exhibition, K-12 teacher's materials, and scholarly book all shared the title One Hundred Summers: A Kiowa Calendar Record.

Swan is a member of the executive board of the Council for Museum Anthropology. He serves on the editorial board for the journal Museum Anthropology Review.

== Collaborators ==
Swan's scholarly collaborators include the late Preston Morrell (Osage), the late Harding Big Bow (Kiowa), and Jason Baird Jackson. He also has collaborated with Mongrain Lookout (Osage).

== Major awards (selected) ==
Swan's 2019 book (with Jim Cooley) Wedding Clothes and the Osage Community: A Giving Heritage (Bloomington: Indiana University Press) was honored with the 2020 Council for Museum Anthropology Book Prize. The book was also recognized as the honorable mention for the Wayland D. Hand Prize awarded by the Folklore and History Section of the American Folklore Society.

== Representative works ==
- Daniel C. Swan (1998) “Early Osage Peyotism.” Plains Anthropologist. 43(163): 51–71.
- Daniel C. Swan (1999) “Peyote Arts at Gilcrease Museum: A Systematic Collection.” American Indian Art Magazine. 24(2): 36–45.
- Daniel C. Swan (1999) Peyote Religious Arts: Symbols of Faith and Belief. Jackson: University Press of Mississippi. OCLC 39849377
- Daniel C. Swan (2003) "Beading Lakota Style." Gilcrease Journal. 11(2):32-46.
- Garrick Bailey and Daniel C. Swan (2005) Art of the Osage. Seattle: University of Washington Press. OCLC 54802028
- Sarah Erwin, Anne Morand, Kevin Smith, and Daniel C. Swan (2005) Treasures of Gilcrease: Selections from the Permanent Collection. Tulsa, OK: Gilcrease Museum.
- Daniel C. Swan (2008) "Peyotism and the Native American Church." In Indians in Contemporary Society. Handbook of North American Indians. Vol. 2 Garrick Bailey, ed., pp. 317–326. Washington DC: Smithsonian Institution.
- Daniel C. Swan (2008) "Contemporary Navajo Peyote Arts." American Indian Art Magazine. 34(1):45-55, 94.
- Daniel C. Swan, eds. (2018) Fluent Generations: The Art of Anita, Tom, and Yatika Fields. Norman: Sam Noble Oklahoma Museum of Natural History.
- Daniel C. Swan, D. and Jim Cooley. (2019) Wedding Clothes and the Osage Community: A Giving Heritage. Bloomington: Indiana University Press.
