= Jeffrey Anderson =

Jeffrey Anderson is the name of:

- Jeffrey Anderson (radio producer) (1928–2014), Canadian music critic, journalist, and television and radio producer
- Jeffrey D. Anderson, American anthropologist
- Jeffrey Anderson (game designer), American video game designer
- Jeffrey Anderson (tuba player) (born 1962), American tuba player
- Jeff Anderson (born 1970), American film actor
- Jeff Anderson (attorney) (born 1947), American attorney

== See also ==
- Geoff Anderson (born 1944), English footballer
- Geoff Anderson (cricketer) (1939–2020), New Zealand cricketer
