= Daniel Swan =

Daniel Swan may refer to:

- Daniel Swan (musician), member of the band The Cortinas
- Daniel C. Swan, American cultural anthropologist and museum curator
