= Frederic W. Gleach =

American anthropologist

Frederic W. Gleach is an American anthropologist who specializes in Native American peoples of Virginia.

== Career ==
He grew up in Virginia and received his Ph.D. in 1992 from the University of Chicago, where he studied with Raymond D. Fogelson.

He was formerly Senior Lecturer and Curator of Anthropology Collections at Cornell University. As of 2026, Gleach is Curator Emeritus.

== Bibliography ==
- Gleach, Frederic W. (1997) Powhatan's World and Colonial Virginia: A Conflict of Cultures. Lincoln: University of Nebraska Press.
- Gleach, Frederic W. (2006) "Pocahontas: An Exercise in Mythmaking and Marketing." In: New Perspectives on Native North America: Cultures, Histories, and Representations, ed. by Sergei A. Kan and Pauline Turner Strong, pp. 433–455. Lincoln: University of Nebraska Press.
