= Historical particularism =

Anthropological school of thought

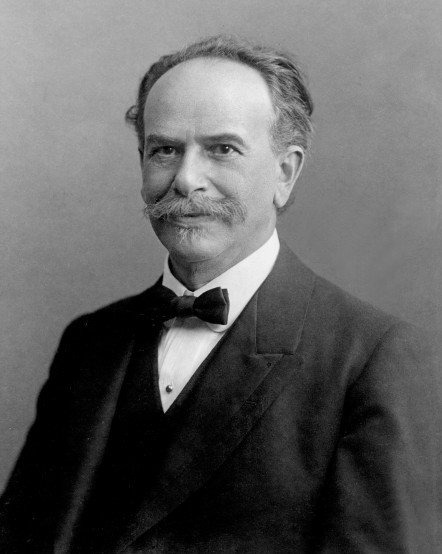
Franz Boas, the founder of historical particularism

Historical particularism is a school of thought in anthropology, closely associated with Franz Boas and his approach to anthropology. The term was coined by Marvin Harris in 1968, and is widely considered the first American anthropological school of thought.

Historical particularism rejected the cultural evolutionary model that had dominated anthropology until Boas, and argued that each society is a collective representation of its unique historical past. Alongside this, Boas rejected parallel evolutionism, the idea that all societies are on the same path and have reached their specific level of development the same way all other societies have. Instead, historical particularism sought to demonstrate that societies could reach the same level of cultural development through different paths.

Boas suggested that diffusion, trade, corresponding environment, and historical accident may create similar cultural traits. Three traits, as suggested by Boas, are used to explain cultural customs: environmental conditions, psychological factors, and historical connections. The last of these, historical connections, was the most important in his framework, as evidenced by the name "historical particularism."

Critics of historical particularism argue that it is anti-theoretical because it doesn't seek to make universal theories applicable to all the world's cultures. Boas believed that theories would arise spontaneously once enough data was collected. Historical particularism influenced other anthropologists who were contemporaries or students of Boas, including Ruth Benedict, Edward Sapir, Robert Lowie, Paul Radin, and Alfred Kroeber.
