= Cultural appropriation =

Adoption of culture and cultural identity perceived as inappropriate

Cultural appropriation is an adoption of an element or elements of culture or identity by members of another culture or identity in a manner perceived as inappropriate or unacknowledged. (Note: Attributed to multiple references:) Charges of cultural appropriation typically arise when members of a dominant culture borrow from minority cultures. (Note: Attributed to multiple references:) Cultural appropriation can include the adoption of another culture's religious and cultural traditions, customs, dance steps, fashion, symbols, language, history and music.

Indigenous peoples working for cultural preservation, advocates of collective intellectual property rights of the originating cultures, and some who have lived or are living under colonial rule have criticized cultural appropriation. According to American anthropologist Jason Baird Jackson, cultural appropriation differs from other modes of cultural change such as acculturation, assimilation, or diffusion. Jackson describes cultural appropriation as something that is thought of as focused outward and done to a certain party. According to Jackson, cultural appropriations can be sources of pain and can bring about feelings of loss or violation for the community affected.

Opponents of cultural appropriation see cultural appropriation as an exploitative means in which cultural elements are lost or distorted as they are removed from their originating cultural contexts. Cultural elements that may have deep meaning in the original culture may be reduced to "exotic" fashion or toys by those from the dominant culture.

The concept of cultural appropriation has also been subject to heavy criticism, debate, and nuance. Critics note that the concept is often misunderstood or misapplied in popular and academic discourse. Others state that the act of cultural appropriation, as defined usually, does not meaningfully constitute social harm or that the term lacks conceptual coherence. Critics also say that the concept sets arbitrary limits on intellectual freedom and artists' self-expression, reinforces group divisions, and promotes enmity or grievance rather than liberation. (Note: Attributed to multiple references:)

== Overview ==
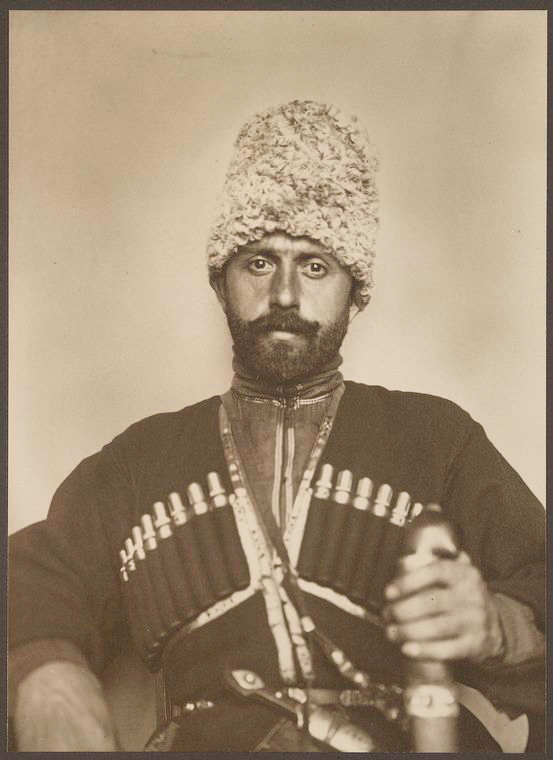
Cossack man wearing the chokha, a clothing item worn by Russian Cossacks that originated from indigenous peoples of the Caucasus

Cultural appropriation can involve the use of ideas, symbols, artifacts, or other aspects of human-made visual or non-visual culture. As a concept that is controversial in its applications, the propriety of cultural appropriation has been the subject of much debate. Opponents of cultural appropriation view many instances as wrongful appropriation when the subject culture is a minority culture or is subordinated in social, political, economic, or military status to the dominant culture or when there are other issues involved, such as a history of ethnic or racial conflict.

Linda Martín Alcoff writes that this is often seen in cultural outsiders' use of an oppressed culture's symbols or other cultural elements, such as music, dance, spiritual ceremonies, modes of dress, speech, and social behaviour, when these elements are trivialised and used for fashion, rather than respected within their original cultural context. Opponents view the issues of colonialism, context, and the difference between appropriation and mutual exchange as central to analysing cultural appropriation. They argue that mutual exchange happens on an "even playing field", whereas appropriation involves pieces of an oppressed culture being taken out of context by a people who have historically oppressed those they are taking from and who lack the cultural context to properly understand, respect, or utilise these elements.

In her book Outspoken: A Decade of Transgender Activism and Trans Feminism, Julia Serano defines cultural appropriation as problematic only when it involves at least one of three interrelated harms: erasure, exploitation, or denigration (EED). According to her analysis, appropriation becomes harmful (what she calls EED appropriation) when members of a dominant or majority group adopt aspects of a marginalized group’s identities, culture, or expressions — while simultaneously:

- Erasing the context in which those identities or cultural forms emerged, ignoring or obscuring the voices and lived experiences of the original community.
- Exploiting those cultural forms for material, symbolic, or commercial gain — benefiting appropriators financially or socially without returning value to the marginalized group.
- Denigrating the marginalized group by treating those borrowed identities or cultural elements as trivial, exotic, or disrespectful — reducing them to stereotypes or mocking them, rather than respecting their meaning and significance.

Serano further distinguishes these harmful “EED appropriations” from what she calls non-EED appropriation — cases where adoption or borrowing does not result in erasure, exploitation, or denigration, and may even positively support or amplify the minority community. She argues that not all acts of borrowing or cultural exchange are inherently oppressive; rather, the ethical problem lies in whether the action inflicts structural harm through erasure, exploitation, or denigration.

The Oxford English Dictionary's earliest citation for the phrase was a 1945 essay by Arthur E. Christy, which discussed Orientalism. The term became widespread in the 1980s in discussions of post-colonial critiques of Western expansionism, though the concept of "cultural colonialism" had been explored earlier, such as in "Some General Observations on the Problems of Cultural Colonialism" by Kenneth Coutts‐Smith in 1976.

Cultural and racial theorist George Lipsitz has used the term "strategic anti-essentialism" to refer to the calculated use of a cultural form outside of one's own to define oneself or one's group. Strategic anti-essentialism can be seen in both minority and majority cultures and is not confined only to the use of the other. However, Lipsitz argues that when the majority culture attempts to strategically anti-essentialize itself by appropriating a minority culture, it must take great care to recognize the specific socio-historical circumstances and significance of these cultural forms so as not to perpetuate the already existing majority vs. minority unequal power relations.

Historically, some of the most hotly debated cases of cultural appropriation have occurred in places where cultural exchange is the highest, such as along the trade routes in southwestern Asia and southeastern Europe. Some scholars of the Ottoman Empire and ancient Egypt argue that Ottoman and Egyptian architectural traditions have long been falsely claimed and praised as Persian or Arab.

In 2021, Jason Baird Jackson attempted to create a model by which instances of cultural appropriation could be understood systematically. He argues that understanding the modes of cultural change most similar to cultural appropriation is key to discussing the outcomes and implications of instances of appropriation as their meaning are often used interchangeably. Jackson offers his definition of appropriation as the "structural inversion of assimilation", being that it is an instance in which "a powerful group takes aspects of the culture of a subordinated group, making them its own."

== Rationale ==
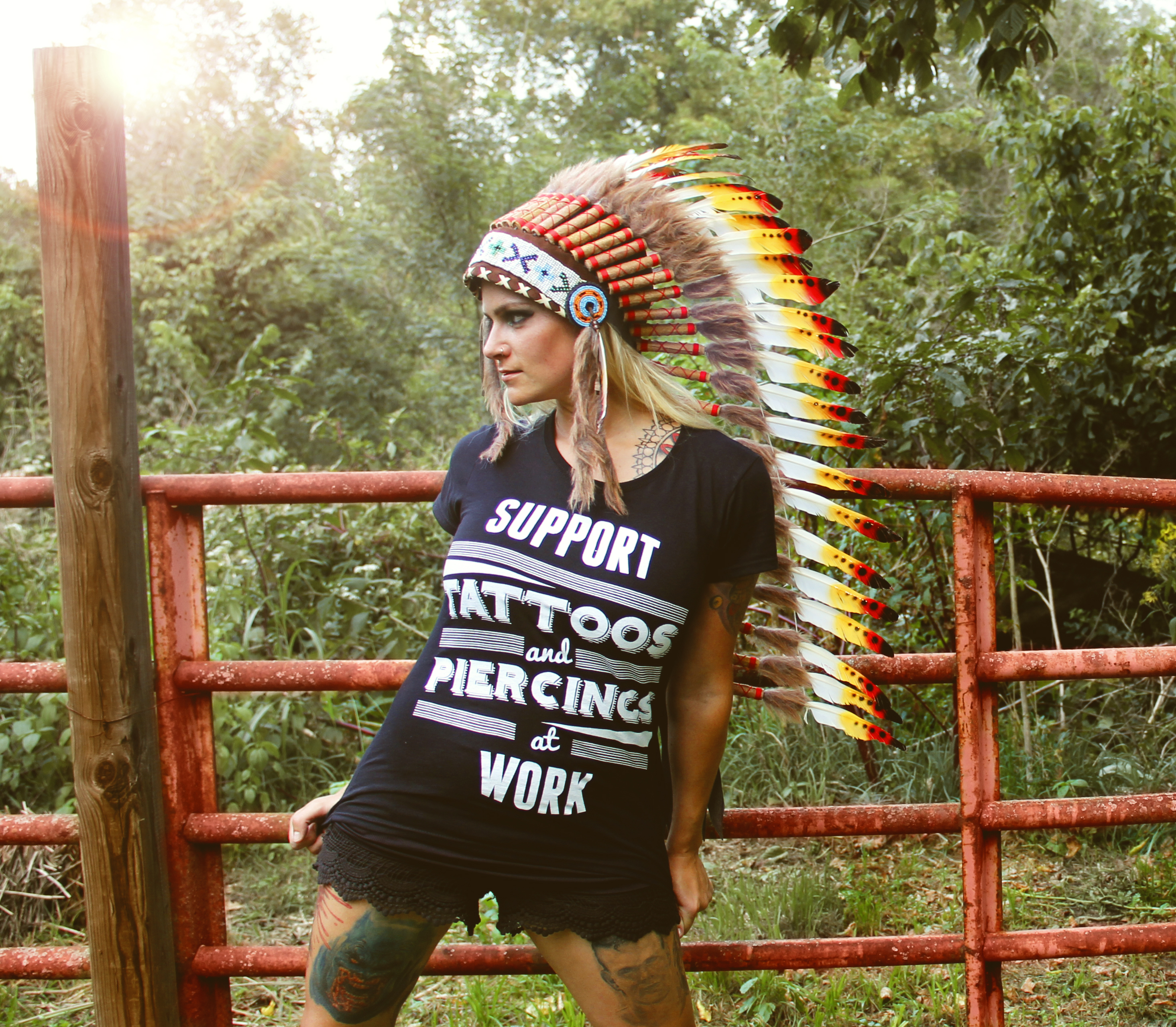
A model wears an imitation Native American war bonnet while campaigning to support body modification in the workplace, 2015.

=== Exploitation ===
Among critics, the misuse and misrepresentation of indigenous cultures are seen as an exploitative form of colonialism and one step in the destruction of indigenous cultures.

The modern New Age movement frequently adopts spiritual ideas and practices from non-Western cultures; according to York, these may include "Hawaiian Kahuna magic, Australian Aboriginal dream-working, South American Amerindian ayahuasca and San Pedro ceremonies, Hindu Ayurveda and yoga, Chinese Feng Shui, Qi Gong, and Tai Chi." The movement has faced criticism for cultural imperialism exploiting intellectual and cultural property of indigenous peoples.

Cultural appropriation is controversial in the fashion industry, with critics contending that some trends commercialise and cheapen the heritage of indigenous cultures. There is debate about whether designers and fashion houses understand the history behind the clothing they appropriate from other cultures, and whether appropriating constitutes a violation of the appropriated-from cultures' shared intellectual property without consent, acknowledgement, or compensation.

Several fashion designers and models have featured imitations of Native American warbonnets in their fashion shows, such as Victoria's Secret in 2012, when model Karlie Kloss wore one during her walk on the runway; a Navajo Nation spokesman called it a "mockery". Cherokee academic Adrienne Keene wrote in The New York Times:

For the [Native American] communities that wear these headdresses, they represent respect, power, and responsibility. The headdress has to be earned, and gifted to a leader in whom the community has placed their trust. When it becomes a cheap commodity anyone can buy and wear to a party, that meaning is erased and disrespected, and Native peoples are reminded that our cultures are still seen as something of the past, as unimportant in contemporary society, and unworthy of respect.

Both Victoria's Secret and Kloss issued apologies stating that they had no intentions of offending anyone.

In 2018, Gucci designers were criticised for sending white models for a catwalk at Milan fashion week wearing a Sikh religious headpiece. Thousands online criticized Gucci for "using the Sikh religious symbol for profit". Sikh Canadian actor Avan Jogia called it "offensive" and "irresponsible" for a white model to be wearing a Sikh turban.

The Boy Scouts of America-associated Koshare Indian Museum and Dancers were noted in Playing Indian by Native American historian Philip J. Deloria, referring to them as an example of "object hobbyists" who adopt the material culture of indigenous peoples of the past ("the vanishing Indian") while failing to engage with contemporary native peoples or acknowledge the history of conquest and dispossession. In the 1950s, the head councilman of the Zuni Pueblo saw a performance and said: "We know your hearts are good, but even with good hearts you have done a bad thing". In Zuni culture, religious objects and practices are only for those who have earned the right to participate, following techniques and prayers that have been handed down for generations.

Israel has been accused of appropriating the Arab culture, particularly in the context of food due to the political power imbalance and the historical displacement of Palestinians. Critics argue that prominent Arab dishes like hummus and falafel are rebranded as Israeli without acknowledging their origins, which critics argue serves to erase Palestinian identity and create a new national narrative connected to the land.

Traditional Middle Eastern and South Asian culture has been the source of debates because of its usage in global fashion and commercialization. Prada was critiqued because they created sandals that resembled Kolhapuri chappals in India. Prada did not acknowledge their origins when releasing the sandal, which led to criticism and caused Prada to acknowledge the country of inspiration. Louis Vuitton also faced criticism in 2021 regarding their high end scarf because the inspiration behind it was the Palestinian keffiyeh. The backlash caused Louis Vuitton to remove the scarf from its website.

There were also debates in Mexico regarding cultural appropriation because of the use of indigenous textiles. In 2015, the Mixe community raised concerns because a French designer, Isabel Marant, used their cultural patterns. The Mixe community was concerned that the patterns would lose their connection to the culture and that they did not receive financial compensation.

==== Sports and Native American iconography ====
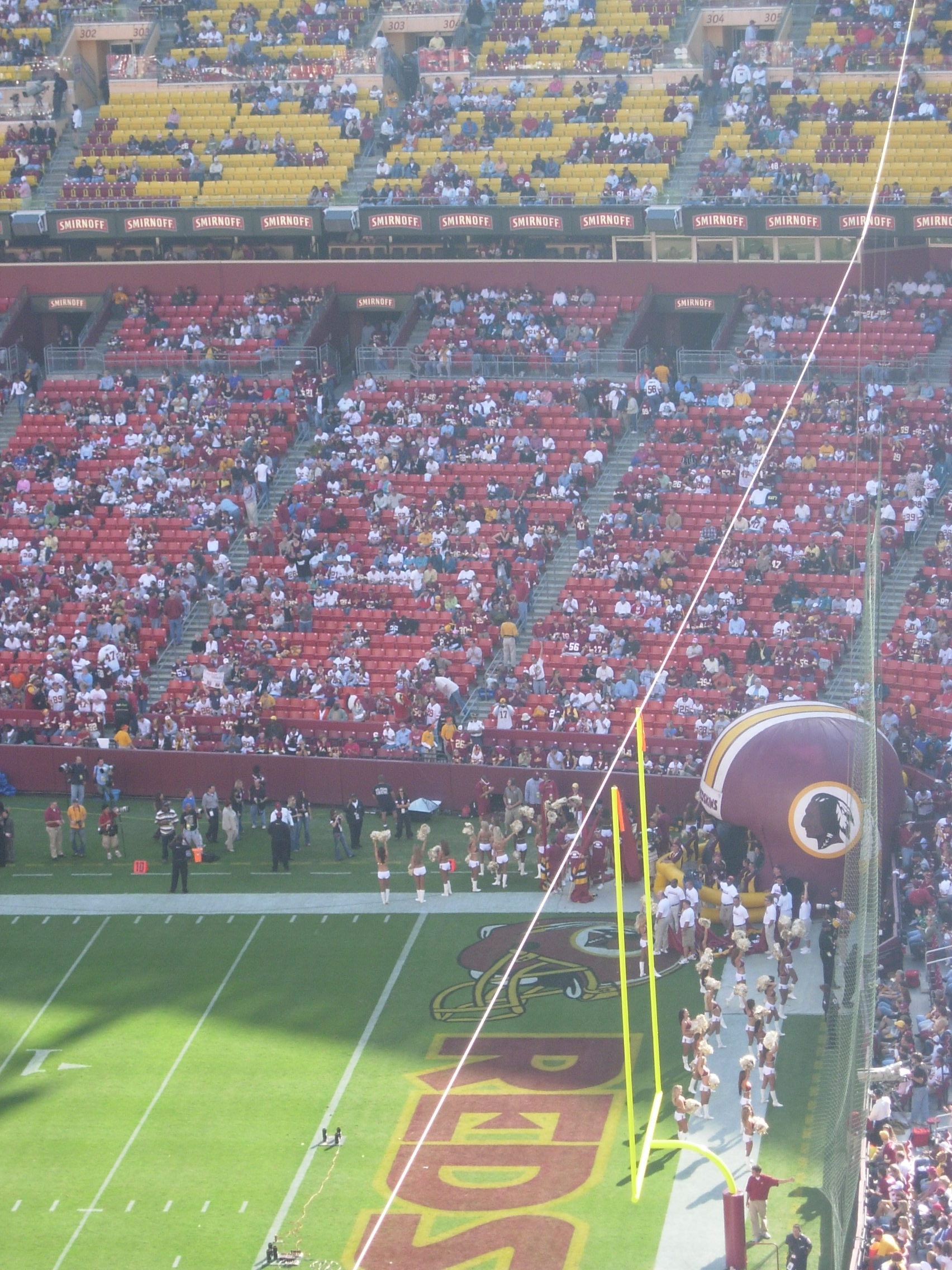
The Washington Redskins in 2006. The team, founded in 1932, stopped using the "Redskins" name and logo in 2020. Since 2022, the team has been known as the Washington Commanders.

In 2017, Mehgan Gallagher spoke about what exactly the debate concerning cultural appropriation entails within the modern age, specifically within the United States. She used contemporary examples of cultural appropriation to highlight cases of controversy. In particular, the Washington Redskins of the National Football League provided an example that led into a broader conversation regarding the representation of Native Americans when it came to sports mascots.

Sports teams in the United States and Canada commonly derive team names, imagery, and mascots from Native American cultures, despite protests from indigenous groups. Cornel Pewewardy, professor and director of Indigenous Nations Studies at Portland State University, cites indigenous mascots as an example of dysconscious racism which, by placing images of Native American or First Nations people into an invented media context, maintains the superiority of the dominant culture. It is argued that such practices maintain the power relationship between the dominant culture and the indigenous culture and can be seen as a form of cultural imperialism.

In 2001, the United States Commission on Civil Rights released a statement calling for an end to the practice. In recognition of the responsibility of higher education to eliminate behaviours that create a hostile environment for education, in 2005, the NCAA initiated a policy against "hostile and abusive" names and mascots that led to the change of many derived from Native American culture, with the exception of those that established an agreement with particular tribes for the use of their specific names. Other schools retain their names because they were founded for the education of Native Americans and continue to have a significant number of indigenous students. The trend towards the elimination of indigenous names and mascots in local schools has been steady, with two-thirds having been eliminated over the past 50 years, according to the National Congress of American Indians (NCAI).

In contrast, the Seminole Tribe of Florida, in what the Washington Post called an unusual move, approved of the Florida State Seminoles use of their historical leader, Osceola, and his Appaloosa horse as the mascots Osceola and Renegade. After the NCAA attempted to ban the use of Native American names and iconography in college sports in 2005, the Seminole Tribe of Florida passed a resolution offering explicit support for FSU's depiction of aspects of Florida Seminole culture and Osceola as a mascot. The university was granted a waiver, citing the close relationship with, and ongoing consultation between, the team and the Florida tribe. In 2013, the tribe's chairman objected to outsiders meddling in tribal approval, stating that the FSU mascot and use of Florida State Seminole iconography "represents the courage of the people who were here and are still here, known as the Unconquered Seminoles". Conversely, in 2013, the Seminole Nation of Oklahoma expressed disapproval of "the use of all American Indian sports-team mascots in the public school system, by college and university level and by professional sports teams".

==== Blackfishing ====
Writer Wanna Thompson popularized the term "blackfishing" in 2018 when describing female white social media influencers who adopt a look perceived to be associated with black people, including braided hair, dark skin from tanning or make-up, and enhanced lips. Critics argue they take attention and opportunities from black influencers by appropriating their aesthetics and have likened the trend to blackface. Florida State University's Alisha Gaines, author of Black for a Day: Fantasies of Race and Empathy, said blackfishing allowed non-Black people to appropriate what is commonly considered "cool" about blackness while still avoiding the negative consequences, such as "racism and state violence". According to Health.com, it is an "inverse form" of passing.

Non-black people wearing dreadlocks have also been accused of cultural appropriation, as it is a hairstyle many associate with African and African diaspora cultures such as Jamaican Rastafari. In 2016 a viral video was published of a young black student arguing with a young white student and accusing him of cultural appropriation. In 2018, white actor Zac Efron was accused of cultural appropriation when he posted a picture of himself in dreadlocks.

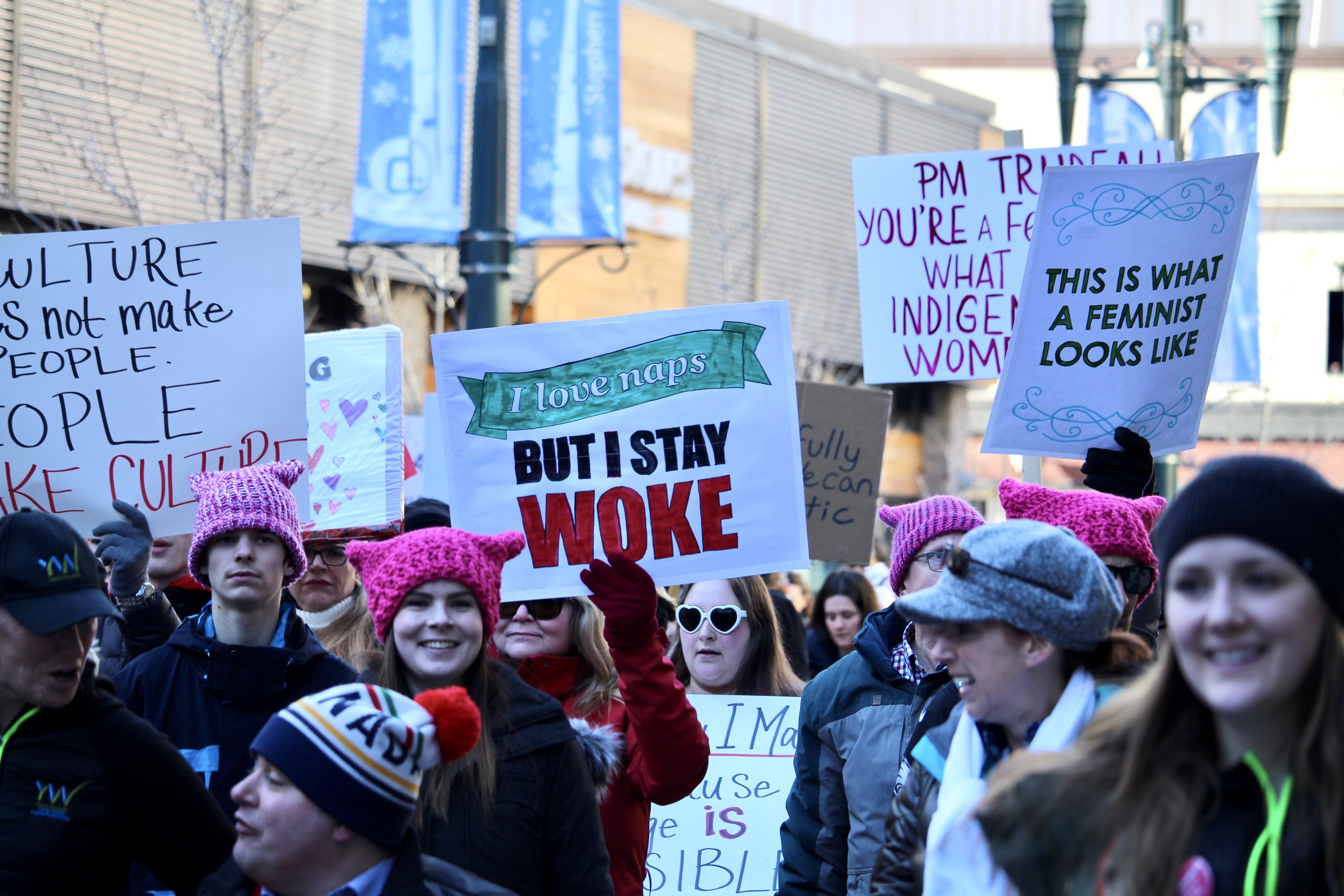
White protestors in 2018 carrying placards using the term woke

The widespread use of African American Vernacular English (AAVE) on social media platform TikTok is also a subject to debate on cultural appropriation. The use of AAVE spreads easily on platforms like TikTok because the platform itself creates an easy and accessible flow of ideas between different social and cultural groups. Critics of the use of the term Gen Z slang to categorize words "slay," "lit," "finna," "sybau," "ts," and others as directly originating from the African American Vernacular English tradition. Jason Parham, a senior writer at WIRED Magazine, expands on this idea and writes "Tiktok is a video-first platform, and on it, creators embody Blackness with an amateur-drive virtuosity—taking on Black rhythms, gestures, affects, slangs." Rachel Elizabeth Laing of Illinois State University states that "[t]his usage of slang by White individuals [on TikTok and in real-life applications] can serve as an intrusion into cultural and personal-enacted-communal identity gaps. This can also be perceived as offensive or disrespectful to the ingroup, increasing the power imbalance between the linguistic majority and minority groups."

The K-pop music industry has been identified as a key player in the appropriation of African American culture, especially pertaining to outfits, hairstyles, language, and style of music. Recent studies have concerned themselves with understanding the origination of the industry's use of African American culture. One of the most recent episodes that ignited debates of cultural appropriation in K-pop occurred in April 2025, with new group Kiss of Life at the forefront. In a livestream video celebrating American member Julie Han's birthday, the four-member girl group dressed up in outfits evocative of a "hip-hop vibe." The members were pictured wearing cornrows, snapback hats, large hoop earrings, and oversized chains. The group's popularity plummeted, and they were even removed from musical festival KCON LA as a result. Other genres such as pop music, white rap, white rock and roll, and white rhythm and blues have all been subjected to conversations of appropriation of Black culture and music. Much of the outrage surrounds the lack of acknowledgment and/or financial compensation.

Additionally, African Americans have been accused of cultural appropriation by people from Africa. This has been disputed, as some members of the black diaspora have claimed a link to Africa, which some Africans have disputed.

==== Martial arts ====
In China, there is longstanding resentment of the Japanese schools of karate for its "colonial appropriation" of kung fu. In the mid-20th century, American soldiers appropriated Japanese karate itself. As mixed martial arts gained popularity in the 21st century, practitioners have appropriated and combined Chinese, Japanese and Thai techniques with Western-style boxing, wrestling, and kickboxing.

During the 2023 Southeast Asian Games (SEA) in Cambodia, Cambodian martial arts competitions adopted Muay Thai rules, leading to allegations of cultural appropriation. Critics argued that this disrespected Thai cultural heritage and overshadowed Cambodian martial arts like Bokator. The International Federation of Muaythai Associations (IFMA) intervened, threatening fines and bans for countries participating in the Kun Khmer events under these rules. This prompted Thailand to boycott the SEA Games. The popularity of Bokator has been partly influenced by international media, such as the portrayal of martial arts in the Tom Yum Goong movie series by Tony Jaa, a Thai martial artist.

=== Inauthenticity and misrepresentation ===
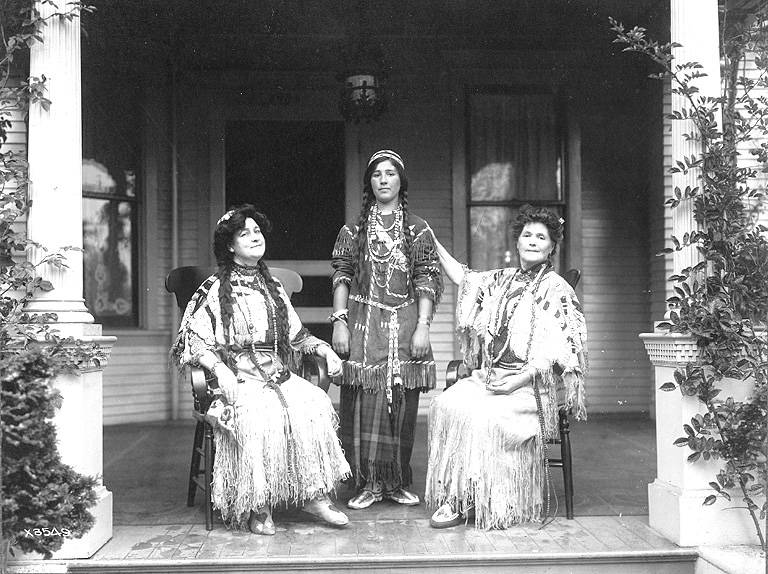
White Americans dressed up in Native American traditional dress (1909)

Copying iconography from another culture's history, such as Polynesian tribal tattoos, Chinese characters, or Celtic art, and wearing them without regard to their original cultural significance may also be considered appropriation. Critics of the practice of cultural appropriation contend that divorcing iconography from its cultural context or treating it as kitsch risks offending people who venerate and wish to preserve their cultural traditions. A term among Irish people for someone who imitates or misrepresents Irish culture is Plastic Paddy.

During the 1920s the works of artists like Frances Derham, Allan Lowe, Olive Nock appropriated Aboriginal Australian motifs. In 1930, Margaret Preston advocated the use of Indigenous Australian motifs in contemporary art. In 2017, Canadian visual artist Sue Coleman garnered negative attention for appropriating and amalgamating styles of indigenous art into her work. Coleman, who has been accused of "copying and selling indigenous-style artwork," has described herself as a "translator" of indigenous art forms, which drew further criticism. In an open letter to Coleman, Kwakwak'awakw/Coast Salish artist Carey Newman wrote that artists being accountable to indigenous communities is the antidote to appropriation. In Australia, Aboriginal artists have discussed an "authenticity brand" to ensure consumers are aware of artworks claiming false Aboriginal significance. The movement for such a measure gained momentum after the 1999 conviction of John O'Loughlin for selling paintings that he falsely described as the work of Aboriginal artist Clifford Possum Tjapaltjarri.

Since the early 2000s, it has become increasingly popular for people not of East Asian or South Asian descent to get tattoos of Devanagari, Korean letters, or Han characters (traditional, simplified, or Japanese), often without knowing the actual meaning of the symbols being used. In 2000, footballer David Beckham received a tattoo in Hindi. Beckham does not have Indian heritage.

Some objections from some Native Americans towards dance teams centre on the idea that the dance performances are a form of cultural appropriation that places dance and costumes in inappropriate contexts devoid of their true meaning, sometimes mixing elements from different tribes. In contrast, the dance teams state that "[their] goal is to preserve Native American dance and heritage through the creation of dance regalia, dancing, and teaching others about the Native American culture".

The government of Ghana has been accused of cultural appropriation in adopting the Caribbean Emancipation Day and marketing it to African American tourists as an "African festival".

==== Stereotyping ====
During Halloween, some people buy, wear, and sell Halloween costumes based on cultural or racial stereotypes. In some cases, theme parties have been held where attendees are encouraged to dress up as stereotypes of a certain racial group. There have been public protests calling for the end to the manufacture and sales of costumes depicting Native Americans and First Nations peoples. Author Kevin Bruyneel writes that the use of Native American tribal names or images as mascots causes harm to indigenous communities, as they often reinforce colonial dynamics and perpetuate stereotypical Euro-American perspectives.

In 2013, pop star Katy Perry drew criticism for her "geisha-style" performance at the American Music Awards, in which she and her backup dancers donned kimonos, heavy powdered face makeup, and colourful parasols, among other East Asian cultural items. Online commentators declared Perry's actions appropriative and harmful to East Asian cultures due to stereotyping.

In 2016, the University of East Anglia prohibited the wearing of sombreros to parties on campus in the belief that these could offend Mexican students for being stereotypical, a move that was widely criticised.

=== Sacredness ===
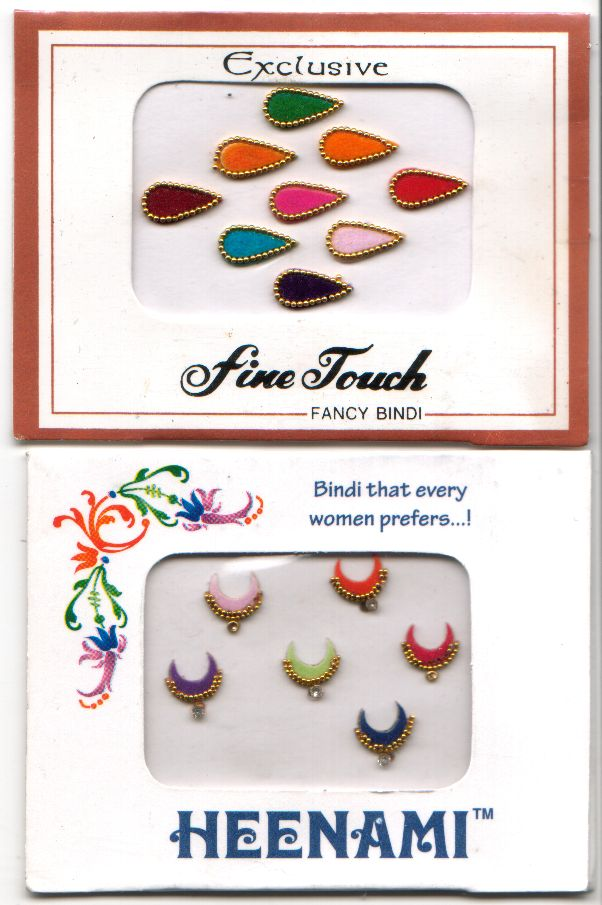
Bindi

Non-Native Americans have been accused of cultural appropriation for wearing jewelry or fashion that incorporates Native American religious symbols, such as the medicine wheel, or wearing items of deep cultural significance and status that traditionally must be earned, such as a war bonnet, without having earned the right.

In 2017, Topshop caused controversy by selling Chinese-made playsuits that imitated the keffiyeh pattern, which social media commentators decried as cultural appropriation.

For some members of the South Asian community, the wearing of a bindi dot as a decorative item by a non-Hindu can be seen as cultural appropriation. Musician Pharrell Williams and Adidas collaborated in 2018 to create a line of apparel inspired by the Hindu festival Holi, called "Hu Holi." Raja Zed, president of the Universal Society of Hinduism, called the collection a "trivialization of traditions-concepts-symbols-beliefs of Hinduism." The collection included many items which contained leather, a violation of Hindu beliefs.

In June 2019, Kim Kardashian launched a line of shapewear lingerie called "Kimono". The name, which Kardashian said was "a nod to the beauty and detail that goes into a garment", was a riff on her first name. The name and its trademarking sparked backlash, and the mayor of Kyoto wrote Kim Kardashian an open letter asking her to drop the trademark, citing its rich history and a desire to prevent monopolization. Kardashian changed the name the next day, writing on Instagram: "I am always listening, learning and growing... When I announced the name of my shapewear line, I did so with the best intentions in mind." An article in Savvy Tokyo interviewed Japanese people about the controversy, with some criticizing Kardashian and others expressing indifference and skepticism at the notion of cultural appropriation and its applicability to Japanese culture.

=== Ownership of culture as intellectual property ===
Some indigenous tribes and the United Nations General Assembly have issued several declarations on the appropriation of indigenous knowledge. The Declaration of War Against Exploiters of Lakota Spirituality includes the passage:

We assert a posture of zero-tolerance for any "white man's shaman" who rises from within our own communities to "authorize" the expropriation of our ceremonial ways by non-Indians; all such "plastic medicine men" are enemies of the Lakota, Dakota, and Nakota people.

In writing about indigenous intellectual property for the Native American Rights Fund (NARF), board member Professor Rebecca Tsosie stresses the importance of these property rights being held collectively, not by individuals:

The long-term goal is to actually have a legal system, and certainly a treaty could do that, that acknowledges two things. Number one, it acknowledges that indigenous peoples are people with a right to self-determination that includes governance rights over all property belonging to the indigenous people. And, number two, it acknowledges that indigenous cultural expressions are a form of intellectual property and that traditional knowledge is a form of intellectual property, but they are collective resources – so not any one individual can give away the rights to those resources. The tribal nations actually own them collectively.

=== Danger of misuse ===
Many Native Americans have criticized what they deem to be the cultural appropriation of their sweat lodge and vision quest ceremonies by non-Natives, and even by Native tribes which have not traditionally held these ceremonies. They contend that there are serious safety risks whenever these events are conducted by those who lack the many years of training and cultural immersion required to lead them safely, mentioning the deaths or injuries in 1996, 2002, 2004, and several high-profile deaths in 2009.

== Criticism of the concept and discourse ==
=== Positive cross-cultural interactions ===
In 2018, conservative columnist Jonah Goldberg described cultural appropriation as a positive thing and dismissed opposition to it as a product of some people's desire to be offended. In 2019, English author Bernadine Evaristo said "This whole idea of cultural appropriation, which is where you are not supposed to write beyond your own culture and so on, is ridiculous ... there is this idea that when it comes to fiction that you are supposed to stay in your lane. It is a total nonsense."

According to Minh-Ha T. Pham, writing for The Atlantic, accusations of cultural appropriation in fashion are often countered with claims of cultural appreciation instead. Some authors have expressed the opinion that the study of martial arts by members of other countries and nationalities is not a form of negative 'appropriation', but rather of appreciation. In Okinawa, unlike in China, the locals considered the Chinese origins of Karate to be an honorable thing to mention, and not a form of cultural theft. In 2024, Angela Gracia B Cruz, Yuri Seo, and Daiane Scaraboto released the results of a study that went about determining strategies consumers used to "self-authorize" how they consumed media that could be considered to be culturally appropriated. They performed a six-year-long study on international K-Pop fans concerning how they felt when it came to determining what was cultural appreciation vs appropriation. One comment they chose to highlight from a redditor named Sam said "Based on my experience, I've observed both. It depends on the context. As an Asian-American, K-Pop fans in America is more appreciation, as opposed to Koreaboos who just use Korean names for comedy are appropriating."

Chris Berg argues that culture is "just the current manifestation of a long evolutionary process" in which cultural elements constantly evolve when there is contact with other cultures. His assertion then is that opponents of cultural appropriation are actually involved in "a deeply conservative project", one that "first seeks to preserve... the content of an established culture and second tries [to] prevent others from interacting with that culture" ultimately inhibiting the positive relationships created by cultural exchange.

Brian Morton writes that "imagining the lives of others is a crucial form of solidarity." Morton criticizes "much of the literature on cultural appropriation" as "spectacularly unhelpful" on the question of what exactly constitutes appropriation. He says that the notion of "taking" from a culture is broad to the point of incoherence, and that the charge of "writing responsibly" when writing fiction about persons outside of one's own culture deprives writers of the freedom to write offensively and satirically, which Morton considers essential to the artistic value of fiction.

In 2016, author Lionel Shriver said that authors from a cultural majority have a right to write in the voice of someone from a cultural minority, attacking the idea that this constitutes cultural appropriation. Referring to a case in which U.S. college students were facing disciplinary action for wearing sombreros to a "tequila party", she said: "The moral of the sombrero scandals is clear: you're not supposed to try on other people's hats. Yet that's what we're paid to do, isn't it? Step into other people's shoes, and try on their hats."

=== Othering ===
Byung-Chul-Han distinguishes between "colonial exploitation" and appropriation, which he calls "an essential part of education and identity" which "only an idiot or a god" could live without. He writes that the notion of appropriation as "sinful" is derivative of "the paradigm of the 'Other' or the 'radically Other' [in] many humanities disciplines", which also tabooizes interest in understanding the 'Other'. Markus Tauschek writes that the notion of appropriation "essentializes cultural difference" by implying that a supposedly appropriated element is the exclusive property of one group. Tauschek says that the concept of cultural appropiation relies on a commodified notion of culture that is at odds with science.

In 2012, Pakistani writer Kamila Shamsie criticized the notion of cultural appropriation as a taboo in fiction, saying: "The moment you say, a male American writer can’t write about a female Pakistani, you are saying, Don’t tell those stories. Worse, you’re saying, as an American male you can’t understand a Pakistani woman. She is enigmatic, inscrutable, unknowable. She’s other. Leave her and her nation to its Otherness. Write them out of your history."

=== Cultural evolution ===
In his book The People vs Democracy (2018), Yascha Mounk criticized the concept. According to his analysis, the problem with cultural appropriation necessarily acknowledges a purist conception of culture, it being linked to the building of a mono-ethnical common identity, which appropriates itself of some rites and traits. He argues that no symbols or traditions minoritarian culture should be denigrated or mocked. But it does open the door to what he calls "historical nonsense". However, cultures have never been completely defined, as they have inspired from one and another, and have thus enriched their own. The segmentation in well-defined cultures works the same way as far right leaders in their views of identity and the defence of their nation, that should not include "foreign influences on their national cultures".

Legal professor Mike Rappaport writes that "there is so much wrong with the idea [of cultural appropriation] that it is hard to know where to start." He contests the notion that people have a special claim to cultural practices historically developed in the territories in which they live, and writes that the concept of cultural appropriation is "inconsistent with the cultural development and enrichment that a free society promotes".

=== Lack of ownership of culture ===
Mathias Siems says that cultural appropriation as a concept presents problems in legal and ethical reasoning. He writes that the notion of intellectual property rights as applied to cultural appropriation is complicated by the fact that some supposed cultural "properties" belong to groups "too large to have any reliable mechanism that would operationalise ... a consent procedure [by which the group could collectively agree to an instance of appropriation]", citing women as an example. He also writes that "a general rejection of any form of cultural appropriation would be harmful for societies", impeding the benefits of cultural mixing.

Kenan Malik defends cultural appropriation as being a form of "messy interaction" necessary to writers and artists, rather than a form of theft. He writes: "Nobody owns a culture, but everyone inhabits one, and in inhabiting a culture, one finds the tools for reaching out to other cultures." Malik also writes that those who levy the charge of appropriation on behalf of their minority communities "appropriate for themselves the authority to license certain forms of cultural engagement, and in doing so, entrench their power," and compares critics of cultural appropriation to historical racist radio stations who refused to broadcast records by black performers to a white audience.

In 2020, American literary theorist Walter Benn Michaels wrote that both enthusiasm and disapproval for cultural appropriation make little sense, as they "both require that we distinguish between one version of our culture (what we actually believe and do) and another version (what we’re supposed to believe and do), and both derive the things we’re supposed to believe and do from our race." He also criticizes the assumption of cultural "belonging" and the validation of "identity crimes" such as cultural appropriation.

In 2023, Jonas R. Kunst, Katharina Lefringhausen, and Hanna Zagefka set about to determine what were the differences between cultural appropriation and genuine cultural change. They detailed what they determined as the "dilemma of cultural ownership", a concept that challenges the idea that "cultures are [not] discrete entities owned by specific groups" and therefore do not have the ability to be stolen or appropriated, and instead offers the rationale that the "impact of power disparities" is too large to ignore in cases of cultural appropriation.

=== Misuse of the concept ===
Kwame Anthony Appiah, ethics columnist for the New York Times, said that the term cultural appropriation incorrectly labels contemptuous behaviour as a property crime. According to Appiah, "The key question in the use of symbols or regalia associated with another identity group is not: What are my rights of ownership? Rather it's: Are my actions disrespectful?"

Ezedimbu et al. write that popular discourse on cultural appropriation misuses the concept and enables cancel culture.

Afua Hirsch called discourse on cultural appropriation in the media unsophisticated, telling writer George Chesterton in 2020: "I’m often asked to come on TV whenever a pop star wears cornrows and defend the idea that I would like to police their hairstyle. There is little interest in the broader picture of imperial racism and white supremacy that forms the context. So it ends up being a reductive conversation about whether it’s OK for white people to do something, which is not my business."

In 2019, Ash Sarkar called cultural appropriation "an imperfect term mobilised in imperfect contexts", writing that charges of cultural appropriation by young people of color in Britain are often partially motivated by a precarious sense of connection to their heritage.

== See also ==
- Enculturation
- Exoticism
- Haka performed by non-New Zealand sports teams
- Orientalism
- Pizza effect
- Pretendian
- Racial fetishism
- Racial misrepresentation
- Romantic racism
- Xenocentrism
