= Alfred Irving Hallowell =

American anthropologist, archaeologist and businessman

- Born: December 28, 1892; Philadelphia, Pennsylvania
- Died: October 10, 1974 (aged 81)
- Education: Wharton School ][University of Pennsylvania]]
- Scientific career
- Fields: Anthropology

Alfred Irving "Pete" Hallowell (/ˈhæləwɛl/; December 28, 1892 – October 10, 1974) was an American anthropologist, archaeologist, and businessman.

== Early life and education ==
Hallowell was born on December 28, 1892, in Philadelphia. He studied at the Wharton School, receiving his Bachelor of Science in 1914. It was assumed he would follow a career in business but Hallowell developed interests in sociology and became first a social worker for the Family Society.

Hallowell expanded his interests, taking classes in anthropology. At the University of Pennsylvania, he completed his Master of Arts in 1920, and his Doctor of Philosophy in anthropology in 1924. His doctoral dissertation was titled "Bear Ceremonialism in the Northern Hemisphere". Hallowell was a student of the anthropologist Frank Speck but whilst studying for his Ph.D., Hallowell travelled to Columbia University to attend the weekly seminar led by Franz Boas – the ideas discussed at which greatly influenced Hallowell's development as an anthropologist.

== Career ==
From 1927 to 1963, Hallowell was a professor of anthropology at the University of Pennsylvania, excepting 1944 through 1947 when he taught the subject at Northwestern University. Hallowell played a central role in developing Northwestern's Anthropology department as a major centre in the United States for the study of the discipline.

Hallowell's main field of study was Native Americans including the Abenaki, the Montagnais-Naskapi but particularly the Ojibwe, about whom he wrote nearly forty individual papers, articles, chapters, and one monograph. This output has been described as "one of the most complete recordings of the changing way of life of a hunting-and-gathering population that is available in the ethnographic record".

In his research, Hallowell utilised anthropological techniques such as ethnography and linguistic studies but also methods drawn from clinical psychology - mainly the Rorschach, or ink-blot, test - to assess the personality structures of Native American populations. Use of such a methodology made Hallowell a controversial figure for many anthropologists.

Hallowell students included the anthropologists Melford Spiro, Anthony F. C. Wallace, Raymond D. Fogelson, George W. Stocking, Jr., Regna Darnell, Erika Eichhorn Bourguignon, James W. VanStone and Marie-Françoise Guédon.

After his retirement, Hallowell's position was filled by the linguistic anthropologist and folklorist Dell Hymes. He died on October 10, 1974, aged 81.

== Honours ==
Hallowell received numerous honors and awards. He served as president of the American Anthropological Association (1949), the American Folklore Society (1940–41), and the Society for Projective Techniques.

Hallowell also served as chairman of the Division of Psychology and Anthropology of the National Research Council (1946–49) and was elected a Fellow of both the National Academy of Sciences (1961) and the American Philosophical Society (1963). He received the Viking Medal for outstanding achievement in anthropology in 1956.

== Selected publications ==
- Bear Ceremonialism in the Northern Hemisphere (1926)
- The Role of Conjuring in Saulteaux Society (1942)
- Culture and Experience (1955)
- Ojibwa Ontology, Behavior, and World View (1960)
- Contributions to Anthropology (1976)
