= Barrik Van Winkle =

American anthropologist

Barrik Van Winkle is an American linguistic and legal anthropologist who has done research on the language and culture of the Washoe people and on gang violence in the United States.

Van Winkle received a Bachelor of Arts from the University of Chicago, where he studied with Raymond D. Fogelson, and an M.A. from the University of Nevada, Reno, where he studied with Warren D'Azevedo and William Jacobsen.

Van Winkle's publications include Scott H. Decker and Barrik Van Winkle, Life in the Gang: Families, Friends, and Violence (Cambridge University Press, 1996), which won an Outstanding Book Award from the Academy of Criminal Justice Science. His articles on the Washoe are published in Social Analysis, Cultural Anthropology, and New Perspectives on Native North America: Cultures, Histories, and Representations.

== Selected works ==
- Sergei Kan and Pauline Turner Strong, eds. (2006) New Perspectives on Native North America: Cultures, Histories, and Representations. University of Nebraska Press.
