= Jason Baird Jackson =

American anthropologist

Jason Baird Jackson (born 1969) is an American anthropologist who is Professor of Folklore and Anthropology at Indiana University Bloomington. He is "an advocate of open access issues and works for scholarly communications and scholarly publishing projects." At IUB, he has served as Chair of the Department of Folklore and Ethnomusicology and as Director of the Folklore Institute. According to the Journal of American Folklore, "Jason Baird Jackson establishes himself as one of the foremost scholars in American Indian studies today."

== Career ==
Jackson was Curator of Anthropology at the Gilcrease Museum in Tulsa, Oklahoma (1995–2000) and Assistant Curator of Ethnology at the Sam Noble Oklahoma Museum of Natural History in Norman, Oklahoma (2000–2004). He remains a research associate at SNOMNH.

A scholar in the tradition of Boasian anthropology, Jackson's research interests include the following areas: (1) folklore and ethnology (intellectual and cultural property issues, folklore and folklife, material culture, religion, ritual, cultural change, ethnohistory, music and dance, ethnobotany, ethnomedicine, social organization, social theory, history of folkloristics and anthropology), (2) linguistic anthropology (verbal art, oratory, language shift, language ideologies, theories of performance, language and culture), (3) curatorship (community collaboration, exhibitions, collections management), (4) American and native American studies (Eastern North America).

Jackson's ethnographic and historical work has focused on the life of the Yuchi, a Native American people residing today in Oklahoma, USA. He has published and edited several books on Native American topics, including Yuchi Ceremonial Life: Performance, Meaning and Tradition in a Contemporary American Indian Community. He has also published numerous articles based on his studies of Native American ethnography and folklore. Jackson has spent time as an editor of the Journal of Folklore Research.

Jackson is the founding editor of Museum Anthropology Review, the first open access, peer-reviewed journal for on the subject of Museum Anthropology. He is also the principal for the Open Folklore Project tasked with "developing tools and resources for open access within Folklore studies." He also serves on the editorial board for Anthropological Quarterly and is one of the 2017 Visiting Faculty for the Smithsonian Summer Institute in Museum Anthropology, a position he has also previously held.

In June 2001, Jackson was awarded a Post-Ph.D. Research Grant from the Wenner-Gren Foundation "to aid archival and ethnographic field research on the role that social dance, musical performance, and cultural performances more generally, play in the network connecting the Woodland Indian communities of central and eastern Oklahoma into a regional system of exchange."

== Representative works ==
Google Scholar Citation Index for Jason Baird Jackson (see citation)

- 2003. Yuchi Ceremonial Life: Performance, Meaning and Tradition in a Contemporary American Indian Community. Studies in the Anthropology of North American Indians. Lincoln: University of Nebraska Press.
- 2004. “Recontextualizing Revitalization: Cosmology and Cultural Stability in the Adoption of Peyotism among the Yuchi,” In Reassessing Revitalization: Perspectives from North America and the Pacific Islands. Michael Harkin, editor. pp. 183–205. Lincoln: University of Nebraska Press.
- 2004. Yuchi, pp. 415–428, in Handbook of North American Indians, (Raymond D.Fogelson, ed.), Vol. 14, Southeast. Smithsonian Institution: Washington DC.
- 2004. Social Organization, pp. 697–706, in Handbook of North American Indians,(Raymond D. Fogelson, ed.), Vol. 14, Southeast. Smithsonian Institution: Washington DC. (with Greg Urban
- 2004. Mythology and Folklore, pp. 707–719, in Handbook of North American Indians, (Ed. Raymond D. Fogelson), Vol. 14, Southeast. Smithsonian Institution: Washington DC. (with Greg Urban)
- 2005. Yuchi Ceremonial Life: Performance, Meaning, and Tradition in a Contemporary American Indian Community. University of Nebraska Press: Lincoln, Nebraska, and London.
- 2006. “On the Review of Digital Exhibitions,” Museum Anthropology, 29(1):1-4.
- 2008. “Traditionalization in Ceremonial Ground Oratory: Native American Speechmaking in Eastern Oklahoma,” in Midwestern Folklore. 34(2):3-16.
