= David Dinwoodie =

American anthropologist (born 1961)

David W. Dinwoodie (born November 11, 1961) is an American anthropologist specializing in the Chilcotin First Nation in British Columbia, Canada. He received his Ph.D. at the University of Chicago, where he studied under Raymond D. Fogelson. He teaches anthropology at the University of New Mexico.

== Bibliography ==
- Dinwoodie, David (1999) Authorizing Voices: Going Public in an Indigenous Language. Cultural Anthropology 13(2):193-223. 1998.
- Dinwoodie, David (1999) Textuality and the ‘Voices’ of Informants: The Case of Edward Sapir’s 1929 Navajo, 1999.
- Dinwoodie, David (2002) Reserve Memories: The Power of the Past in a Chilcotin Community. Lincoln: University of Nebraska Press.
- Dinwoodie, David (2003) Navajo Linguist. Anthropological Linguistics 45.4:427-49. 2003.
- Kan, Sergei A., and Pauline Turner Strong, eds. (2006) New Perspectives on Native North America: Cultures, Histories, and Representations. Lincoln: University of Nebraska Press.
