= Boasian anthropology =

Anthropology model

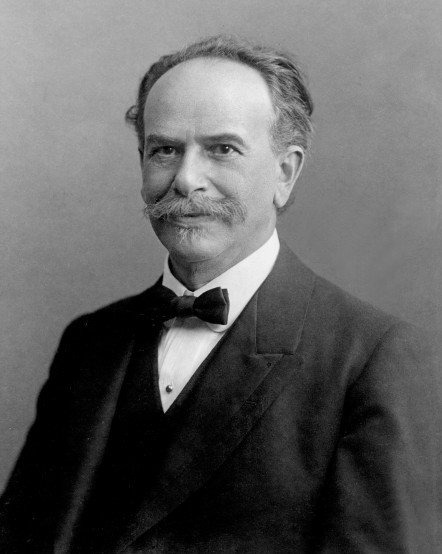
Franz Boas (1858–1942), founder of the Boasian tradition in American anthropology

Boasian anthropology was a school within American anthropology founded by Franz Boas in the late 19th century. It was based on the four-field model of anthropology uniting the fields of cultural anthropology, linguistic anthropology, physical anthropology, and archaeology. It stressed cultural relativism, and separation of biological and cultural determinants of behavior. Boas was widely influential in 20th century anthropology training many students who went on to major positions in the field.

== Overview ==
It was based on an understanding of human cultures as malleable and perpetuated through social learning, and understood behavioral differences between peoples as largely separate from and unaffected by innate predispositions stemming from human biology—in this way it rejected the view that cultural differences were essentially biologically based. It also rejected ideas of cultural evolution which ranked societies and cultures according to their degree of "evolution", assuming a single evolutionary path along which cultures can be ranked hierarchically, rather Boas considered societies varying complexities to be the outcome of particular historical processes and circumstances—a perspective described as historical particularism.

Another important aspect of Boasian anthropology was its perspective of cultural relativism which assumes that a culture can only be understood by first understanding its own standards and values, rather than assuming that the values and standards of the anthropologist's society, can be used to judge other cultures. In this way Boasian anthropologists did not assume as a given that non-Western societies are necessarily inferior to Western ones, but rather attempt to understand them on their own terms. From this approach also stemmed an investment in understanding and protecting cultural minorities, and in critiquing and relativizing American and Western society through contrasting its values and norms with those of other societies. Boasian anthropology in this way tended to consider political activism, through scientific education about society, a significant part of the scientific project.

The program of research and public education activities pursued by Boas, his former students, and their associates—eventually including most of the field of anthropology as practiced in the United States—encompassed a number of discrete areas of inquiry and activity. These include many anthropological specializations and neighboring inter-disciplines, such as those known today as museum anthropology, folkloristics, linguistic anthropology, Native American studies, and ethnohistory.

== Boasian anthropologists ==
Boas had a large group of students who dominated the first generation of professional anthropologists in the United States, and went on to found many of the earliest anthropology departments in the country. Among the prominent students of Boas who became exponents of Boasian anthropology were:

- Ruth Benedict
- Ruth Bunzel
- Roland Burrage Dixon
- Alexander Goldenweiser
- Melville Herskovits
- Zora Neale Hurston
- Melville Jacobs
- Alfred Kroeber
- Alexander Lesser
- Robert Lowie
- Margaret Mead
- Elsie Clews Parsons
- Paul Radin
- Gladys Reichard
- Edward Sapir
- Frank Speck
- Leslie Spier
- John R. Swanton
- Ruth Underhill
- Gene Weltfish

== Critiques ==
In the mid 20th century, Boasian anthropology came under critique both from those students who wanted to reintroduce evolutionary processes into the study of culture, and from those who disagreed with its relativist stance and its view that biological differences did not reflect innate differences in human ability or potential. In the late 20th century earlier Boasian anthropology was also critiqued for its acceptance of race as a valid biological category, leading to attempts to redefine a neo-Boasian anthropology which studies the particular historical trajectories leading to the construction of social categories of cultures and races.

== See also ==
- Cultural relativism
