= Robert A. Brightman =

American anthropologist

Robert A. Brightman is an American anthropologist and the Greenberg Professor of Native American studies in the Department of Anthropology at Reed College in Portland, Oregon. Brightman is known for his work among the Cree Indians in Manitoba, Canada.

He received his undergraduate education at Reed College, graduating in 1973. He earned his MA (1976) and Ph.D. in anthropology from the University of Chicago in 1983. There he studied under Raymond D. Fogelson.

His 1993 book Grateful Prey is an examination of human-animal relationships, hunting cosmology, and spirituality among the Rock Cree.

Since approximately 2002, he has begun studying hunter-gatherer castes in South India.

== Selected works ==
- (1988) "The Windigo in the Material World." Ethnohistory, vol. 35, no. 4, pp. 337–379.
- (1989) Acimowina and Ãcaðõhkĩwina: Traditional Narratives of the Rock Cree Indians. Ottawa: Canadian Museum of Civilization.
- (1990) "Primitivism in Missinippi Cree Historical Consciousness." Man, vol. 25, pp. 399–418.
- (1993) Grateful Prey: Rock Cree Human-Animal Relationships. Berkeley: University of California Press.
- (1995) "Forget Culture: Replacement, Transcendence, Relexification." Cultural Anthropology, Vol. 10, No. 4. (Nov., 1995), pp. 509–546
- (1999) "Traditions of Subversion and the Subversion of Tradition: Cultural Criticism in the Maidu Clown Performances." American Anthropologist, vol. 101, no. 2, pp. 272–287.
- (2004) "Chitimacha." Handbook of North American Indians, Vol. 14 "Southeast", Smithsonian Institution, Washington, D.C.
- (2006) "Culture and Culture Theory in Native North America." In: New Perspectives on Native North America: Cultures, Histories, and Representations, ed. by Sergei A. Kan and Pauline Turner Strong, pp. 351–394. Lincoln: University of Nebraska Press.
