= Raymond Bucko =

American anthropologist

Raymond A. Bucko, S.J. is an American Jesuit priest and anthropologist noted for his work among the Lakota Indians.

Bucko received his Ph.D. in anthropology in 1992 from the University of Chicago, where he studied under Raymond D. Fogelson. He specializes in cultural anthropology and published a book on the Lakota sweat lodge in 1998. He is an emeritus Professor of Anthropology at Creighton University. He is also the founder of the Network of Anthropologists at Jesuit Institutions.

== Sources ==
- Bucko, Raymond A. (1998) The Lakota Ritual of the Sweat Lodge: History and Contemporary Practice. Lincoln: University of Nebraska Press.
- Kan, Sergei A., and Pauline Turner Strong, eds. (2006) New Perspectives on Native North America: Cultures, Histories, and Representations. Lincoln: University of Nebraska Press.
