= Pauline Turner Strong =

American anthropologist

Pauline Turner Strong is an American anthropologist specializing in literary, historical, ethnographic, media, and popular representations of Native Americans. Theoretically her work has considered colonial and postcolonial representation, identity and alterity, and hybridity. She has also researched intercultural captivity narratives, intercultural adoption practices, and the appropriation of Native American symbols and practices in U.S. sports and youth organizations.

She received a B.A. in philosophy from Colorado College, and a Ph.D. in anthropology from the University of Chicago, where she studied with Raymond D. Fogelson and George W. Stocking, Jr.

She is professor of anthropology and women's and gender studies at the University of Texas, Austin, where she is also director of the Humanities Institute. In 2006 she received the Outstanding Graduate Teaching Award from the University of Texas at Austin.

== Selected works ==
- “‘Indian Blood’: Reflections on the Reckoning and Refiguring of Native North American Identity.” Cultural Anthropology 11, no. 4: 547-76. (1996)
- “Playing Indian in the 1990s: Pocahontas and The Indian in the Cupboard.” (1998) In Hollywood’s Indian: The Portrayal of the Native American in Film, pp. 187–205. Ed. Peter C. Rollins and John E. O’Connor. Lexington: University Press of Kentucky. 2d. ed., 2003.
- Theorizing the Hybrid. Special issue, Journal of American Folklore, vol. 112, no. 445 (1999).
- Captive Selves, Captivating Others: The Politics and Poetics of Colonial American Captivity Narratives. Westview Press/Perseus Books. (1999)
- "To Forget Their Tongue, Their Name, and Their Whole Relation." In Relative Values: Reconfiguring Kinship Studies, ed. Sarah Franklin and Susan McKinnon. Durham and London: Duke University Press. (2001)
- “Transforming Outsiders: Captivity, Adoption, and Slavery Reconsidered.” A Companion to American Indian History, pp. 339–356. Ed. Philip J. Deloria and Neal Salisbury. Malden, MA and Oxford, U.K.: Blackwell Publishers. (2002)
- “Representational Practices.” A Companion to the Anthropology of North American Indians, pp. 341–359. Ed. Thomas Biolsi. Malden, MA and Oxford, UK: Blackwell Publishers. (2004)
- "Recent Ethnographic Research on North American Indigenous Peoples." Annual Review of Anthropology 34: 253–68. (2005)
- “What is an Indian Family? The Indian Child Welfare Act and the Renascence of Tribal Sovereignty.” Indigenous Peoples of the United States. Special issue: American Studies 46:3/4 (Fall-Winter 2005).
- New Perspectives on Native North America: Cultures, Histories, and Representations. Lincoln: University of Nebraska Press. (2006)
- American Indians and the American Imaginary: Cultural Representation Across the Centuries. Boulder, CO: Paradigm Publishers. (2012)
