= Museum anthropology =

Museum anthropology is a domain of scholarship and professional practice in the discipline of anthropology.

== Characteristics ==
A distinctive characteristic of museum anthropology is that it cross-cuts anthropology's sub-fields (archaeology, cultural anthropology, linguistic anthropology, biological anthropology) as these are understood in North American anthropology. All of these areas are sometimes pursued in museum contexts (usually on the basis of research work with systematic collections) and all can be (and are) explicated in museum-based exhibitions and public programs. Some museum anthropologists work full or part-time in museum contexts while others are anthropologists (employed in diverse settings) interested in studying museums as social institutions in cultural and historical context. These two sets of concerns—collections-based scholarship and the study of museums—provide the core around which the domain of museum anthropology has self-organized.

One theme prominent in recent museum anthropology research concerns reconnecting older collections of ethnographic objects curated in museum contexts with the present-day source communities from which these objects were gathered. Another concern is the development of museums and cultural centers by indigenous peoples in their own home communities.

== Other relationships ==
There is much traffic between museum anthropology and the related, overlapping, and neighboring domains of (general) archaeology, museum folklore, material culture studies, historical anthropology, visual anthropology, the anthropology of art, and the history of anthropology, as well as the art history of non-western societies and the field of museum studies.

== Journals ==
The journals Museum Anthropology, Journal of Museum Ethnography, Gradhiva, and Museum Anthropology Review are closely identified with museum anthropology as a field.

== Museum anthropology and ethnography ==
Drawing upon critiques of ethnographic representation in written genres, museum anthropologists have asked questions about the strategies used to represent histories and cultures in museum exhibitions and related forms of display (such as worlds fairs). Related is historical work in which museum anthropologists seek to better understand the contexts, histories and biographies that shaped both the field and the collections that contemporary curators steward. Such historical concerns in turn intersect with work addressing repatriation claims and broader cultural property issues as these relate to museums.

Use of museum collections as a resource for research aimed at understanding ethnographic and culture historical questions in the lives of particular communities has long been the core motivation for collecting by anthropology museums. Such work has been central throughout the history of the field, but new developments in digital technologies (and the rise of the so-called digital humanities) together with the transformations that have motivated the new research interests just mentioned have generated an intensification of such work. A general revitalization of material culture studies is a further factor conditioning the renewal of collections-based research in the present period. The fruits of this work include new digital archives and databases, as well as published studies focusing on particular groups, object forms, and collections.

== United Kingdom and North America ==
Professional organizations central to the museum anthropology domain include the Council for Museum Anthropology (a section of the American Anthropological Association) in the United States and the Museum Ethnographers Group in the United Kingdom.

In the United Kingdom and in North America, most universities that possess both anthropology degree programs and campus-based museums of anthropology will also offer specific training and coursework in museum anthropology. Specialized training for graduate students in collections-based research in museum anthropology (focusing on ethnographic rather than archaeological, biological, or linguistics collections) is provided in the Smithsonian Institution's Summer Institute in Museum Anthropology (SIMA), an initiative funded by the U.S. National Science Foundation.

== Important persons ==
Prominent figures in the history of museum anthropology include:

- Augustus Pitt Rivers (1827–1900)
- Franz Boas (1858–1942)
- Lev Sternberg (1861–1927)
- Henry Balfour (1863–1939)
- James W. VanStone (1925–2001)
- William C. Sturtevant (1926–2007)
- Michael Ames (1933–2006)
