= Brenda Farnell =

British anthropologist

- Born: Kingston upon Hull, Yorkshire
- Education: University of Indiana
- Occupation: Anthropologist
- Years active: 1981–present

Brenda Farnell is a British-American anthropologist and Professor of American Indian Studies and Anthropology at the University of Illinois. Her areas of focus include dance, movement, performance, language, and Labanotation. Her work is influenced by Sociocultural Theory, Visual Anthropology, Ethnopoetics, and Semiotic Anthropology. Farnell's use of Labanotation as a research tool has developed dance and performance notation in the field of Anthropology. She focuses on the North American Plains culture areas, including the Nakota, Crow, and Comanche nations. Her work includes extensive study of Plains Sign Language, storytelling practices, Indigenous epistemologies, expressive culture, and endangered language revitalization. She also examines American contemporary dance, choreography, and theatre. She has collaborated with individuals in her field such as Robert Wood, Tim Ingold, Charles R. Varela, Dixie Durr, and Drid Williams.

== Early life and education ==
Born in Kingston upon Hull, Yorkshire, Farnell received her bachelor's degree in education from the University of Liverpool in 1969, where she majored in dance studies and physical education and minored in biology. In 1977 she received the Diploma in Dance from the Laban Dance Center, Goldsmiths College, London University (now called Laban). In 1984, she completed her Master of Arts degree in anthropology of human movement from New York University. She completed her Ph.D. in social, cultural, and linguistic anthropology in 1990, from Indiana University.

== Career ==
Farnell is a professor in the Department of Anthropology and American Indian Studies at the University of Illinois. She is a coeditor for the Journal for the Anthropological Study of Human Movement for the University of Illinois Press. She is on the Professional Advisory Board for the Dance Notation Bureau.

In 2011, Farnell became a member of the Indigenous Knowledge, Contemporary Performance research and creation project at the University of Guelph.

In 2008, Farnell was elected, for a three-year term, as a member of the Minority Issues in Anthropology Committee for the American Anthropological Association.

In 2002, she received a position as Research Associate as the University of Illinois Urbana Champaign Centre for Advanced Study.

== Awards and achievements ==
In 2009, Farnell won the University of Illinois Department of Anthropology Distinguished Service award. She received this award for second time in 2017.

In 2005, her work, Talking from the Body in Post-modern Dance, was awarded the University of Illinois Urbana Champaign Research Board Award.

In 2000, she won the University of Illinois Urbana Champaign Award as a Helen Corley Petit Scholar.

In 1997, her work was presented at the Native American Film Festival at the Smithsonian National Museum of the American Indian in New York city.

In 1996, Farnell won the Haozous Award in New Technologies at the Native Americas International Film Festival for her interactive, multimedia ethnography Wiyuta: Assiniboine Storytelling with Signs.

== Publications ==
=== Books ===
- and Drid Williams, 1990. The Laban Script: A Beginning Text on Movement Writing for Non-Dancers. Canberra: Australian Institute of Aboriginal Studies.
- 1995. Do You See What I Mean?: Plains Indian Sign Talk and the Embodiment of Action. Austin: University of Texas Press.
- 2012. Dynamic Embodiment for Social Theory: I Move Therefore I am. London: Routledge.

=== Edited works ===
- (ed.) 1995. Human Action Sign Systems in Cultural Context: The Visible and the Invisible in Movement and Dance. Metuchen, NJ: Scarecrow Press.

=== Encyclopedia entries ===
- 2016. "Kinesthetic System." SAGE Encyclopedia of Theory in Psychology, London and New Delhi: Sage Publications.
- 2018. "Mindful Body." International Encyclopedia of Anthropology, Wiley Online Library.
- 2018. "Techniques of the Body." International Encyclopedia of Anthropology, Wiley Online Library.

=== Journal articles ===
- 1981. "Dance and Dance Education in England: A British Point of View." Journal for the Anthropological Study of Human Movement 1:3, p. 166-185.
- and Dixie Durr, 1981. "Spatial Orientation and the Notion of Constant Oppositions." Journal for the Anthropological Study of Human Movement 1:4, p. 226-245.
- 1982. "Deep Structures of the Dance: A Reply to Zellinger’s 'Directions for a Semiotics of Dance'" Journal for the Anthropological Study of Human Movement 2:2, p. 112-119.
- 1984. "Two Sign Languages: A Report on Work in Progress." Journal for the Anthropological Study of Human Movement 3:1, p. 8-35.
- 1985. "The Hands of Time: An Exploration into some Features of Deixis in American Sign Language." Journal for the Anthropological Study of Human Movement 3:3, p. 100-116.
- 1988. "Some Problems with Spoken Language Models in the Analysis of Sign Languages." Journal for the Anthropological Study of Human Movement 5:1, p. 19-31.
- 1995. "Ethnography Goes Interactive." Anthropology Today, p. 7-10.
- 1996. "Metaphors We Move By." Visual Anthropology 8, p. 311-335.
- 1999. "Moving Bodies, Acting Selves." Annual Review of Anthropology 28, p. 341-73.
- 2000. "Getting Out of the Habitus: An Alternative Model of Dynamically Embodied Social Action." Journal of the Royal Anthropological Institute 6, p. 397-418.
- 2001. "Rethinking Verbal and Non-Verbal in Discursive Performance." Textus 14, p. 417-436.
- 2002. "Dynamic Embodiment in Assiniboine (Nakota) Storytelling." Anthropological Linguistics 44:1, p. 37-64.
- 2003. "Birdwhistell, Hall, Lomax and the Origins of Visual Anthropology." Visual Anthropology 16, p. 43-55.
- 2004. "The Fancy Dance of Racializing Discourse." Journal for Sport and Social Issues 28:1, p. 30-55.
- 2004. "Zero Sum Game: An Update on the Native American Mascot Controversy at the University of Illinois." Journal for Sport and Social Issues 28:2 p. 212-215.
- 2005. "Developments in the Study of Gesture." Language Anthropological Linguistics 46:1, p. 100-115.
- 2007. "Choreographing Colonialism in the American West." Journal for the Anthropological Study of Human Movement 14:3.
- and Robert Wood, 2007. "Choreography as Live Theoretical Practice." Proceedings of the Society of Dance History Scholars.
- 2007. "Dancing With Authorization: From the Reservation to Ramallah." Journal for the Anthropological Study of Human Movement 14:4.
- 2008. "Indigenous Dances on Stage: Embodied Knowledge at Risk?" Taiwan Dance Research Journal 4, p. 151-180.
- 2016. "The Second Somatic Revolution." Journal for the Anthropological Study of Human Movement 23:2.

=== Contributions ===
- in Williams, Drid, 1991. Anthropology and Dance: Ten Lectures. Illinois: University of Illinois Press.
- in Ingold, Tim, 2016. Redrawing Anthropology: Materials, Movements, Lines. New York: Routledge.
