= Jeffrey D. Anderson =

American anthropologist

Jeffrey D. Anderson is an American anthropologist who specializes in Arapaho culture and Arapaho language and culture. He received his Ph.D. from the University of Chicago, where he studied under Raymond D. Fogelson.

He is currently Professor of Anthropology at Hobart and William Smith Colleges.

== Works ==
=== Books ===
- 2001. The Four Hills of Life: Northern Arapaho Knowledge and Life Movement. Anthropology of North American Indians Series, Raymond J. DeMallie and Douglas R. Parks (eds). Lincoln: University of Nebraska Press.
- 2003. One Hundred Years of Old Man Sage: An Arapaho Life Story. Anthropology of North American Indians Series, Raymond J. DeMallie and Douglas R. Parks (eds). University of Nebraska Press.
- 2013. Arapaho Women's Quillwork: Motion, Life, and Creativity. Norman: University of Oklahoma Press.

=== Articles, monographs and other short works ===
- 1997. "Introduction." In George Dorsey and Alfred L. Kroeber, Traditions of the Arapaho. Lincoln: University of Nebraska Press.
- 1998. "Ethnolinguistic Dimensions of Northern Arapaho Language Shift", Anthropological Linguistics 40:1:1–64.
- 2001. "The Motion-Shape of Whirlwind Woman in Arapaho Women's Quillwork". European Review of Native American Studies. 14:1:11–21.
- 2002. "Northern Arapaho Conversion of a Christian Text: The Our Father". Ethnohistory 48:4:689–712.
- 2003. "Arapaho." In Ember, Melvin, Carol R. Ember, and Ian Skoggard (eds), Encyclopedia of World Cultures Supplement. New York: Macmillan Reference.
- 2005. "Arapaho Ghost Dance Songs Retranslated." In Brian Swann (ed.), Voices from Four Directions: Contemporary Translations of the Native Literatures of North America. Lincoln. University of Nebraska Press.
- 2006. "Seven Ways of Looking at Old Man Sage". In Catherine O'Neil, Mary Scoggin, and Kevin Tuite (eds), Language, Culture and the Individual: A Tribute to Paul Friedrich. Munich, Germany: LINCOM Studies in Anthropology (LiSA).
- 2006. "The Poetics of Tropes and Dreams in Arapaho Ghost Dance Songs". In Sergei A. Kan and Pauline Turner Strong (eds), New Perspectives on Native North America: Cultures, Histories, Representations. Lincoln: University of Nebraska Press.
