= Melford Spiro =

American anthropologist (1920–2014)

Melford Elliot Spiro (April 26, 1920 – October 18, 2014) was an American cultural anthropologist specializing in religion and psychological anthropology. He is known for his critiques of the pillars of contemporary anthropological theory—wholesale cultural determinism, radical cultural relativism, and virtually limitless cultural diversity—and for his emphasis on the theoretical importance of unconscious desires and beliefs in the study of stability and change in social and cultural systems, particularly in respect to the family, politics, and religion. Explicated in numerous theoretical publications, they are empirically exemplified in monographs based on his fieldwork in Ifaluk atoll in Micronesia, an Israeli kibbutz, and a village in Burma (now Myanmar).

Spiro was a significant figure in a series of debates over cultural relativism and postmodern theory among American cultural anthropologists in the 1980s and early 1990s, in which he consistently argued for the importance of the comparative method and the appreciation of universal cultural and psychological processes.

Spiro received his B.A. from the University of Minnesota in 1942, where he majored in philosophy, following which he studied at the Jewish Theological Seminary in New York. Having developed an interest in culture theory, he explored this interest through enrolling in the anthropology department at Northwestern University, where he worked with Melville Herskovits and A. Irving Hallowell, and received his PhD in 1950. He taught at Washington University in St. Louis, University of Connecticut, University of Washington, and University of Chicago before moving In 1968 to the University of California, San Diego where he was a founding member of the anthropology department. He received postgraduate training in psychoanalysis at the San Diego Psychoanalytic Center and practiced as a lay analyst, additionally overseeing a course series at UCSD that exposed graduate students in anthropology to psychiatric training.

Spiro became professor emeritus at UCSD in 1990, but continued teaching for another decade. He was a member of the National Academy of Sciences and the American Academy of Arts and Sciences. He served terms as president of the American Ethnological Society and the Society for Psychological Anthropology (SPA) and was one of the founders of the SPA's journal, Ethos.

Spiro was married for 62 years to Audrey Spiro, with whom he had two sons. He died in La Jolla, CA, in October 2014 of natural causes.

== Select bibliography ==
- Spiro, Melford E. (1956) Kibbutz:Venture in Utopia. Cambridge:Harvard University Press.
- Spiro, Melford E. (1958) Children of the Kibbutz. Cambridge: Harvard University Press.
- Spiro, Melford E. (1967) Burmese Supernaturalism:A Study in the Explanation and Resolution of Suffering. Englewood Cliffs, N.J.:Prentice Hall.
- Spiro, Melford E. (1971) Buddhism and Society: A Great Tradition and its Burmese Vicissitudes. New York: Harper and Row.
- Spiro, Melford E. (1977) Kinship and Marriage in Burma:A Cultural and Psychodynamic Analysis. Los Angeles:University of California Press.
- Spiro, Melford E. (1979) Gender and Culture:Kibbutz Women Revisited. Durham, N.C.:Duke University Press.
- Spiro, Melford E. (1982) Oedipus in the Trobriands. Chicago:University of Chicago Press.
- Spiro, Melford E. (1987) Culture and Human Nature: Theoretical Papers of Melford E.Spiro. Benjamin Kilborne and L.L. Langness, eds.Chicago:University of Chicago Press.
- Spiro, Melford E. (1992) Anthropological Other or Burmese Brother? Studies in Cultural Analysis. New Brunswick (USA): Transaction Publishers.
- Spiro, Melford E. (1997) Gender Ideology and Psychological Reality:An Essay on Cultural Reproduction. New Haven:Yale University Press.
- Spiro, Melford E. (1984) "Some Reflections on Cultural Determinism and Relativism with Special Reference to Emotion and Reason". pp. 323–346 in Culture Theory: essays on mind, self, and emotion, edited by R. A. Shweder and R. A. LeVine. Cambridge, UK: Cambridge University Press.
- Spiro, Melford E. (1986). "Cultural Relativism and the Future of Anthropology". Cultural Anthropology. 1 (3): 259–286. doi:10.1525/can.1986.1.3.02a00010. S2CID 145249843.
- Spiro, Melford E. (1987) "Religious systems as culturally constituted defense mechanisms". pp. 145–160 in Culture and human nature: theoretical papers of Melford E. Spiro, edited by B. Kilborne and L. L. Langness. Chicago: University of Chicago Press.
- Spiro, Melford E. (1992) "On the strange and familiar in recent anthropological thought". pp. 53–70 in Anthropological Other or Burmese Brother? edited by M. E. Spiro. New Brunswick, NJ: Transaction Press.
- Spiro, Melford E. (1993). "Is the Western Conception of the Self 'Peculiar' within the Context of the World Cultures?". Ethos. 21 (2): 107–153. doi:10.1525/eth.1993.21.2.02a00010.
- Kilborne, Benjamin, and L.L. Langness, eds. (1987 Culture and human nature: Theoretical papers of Melford E. Spiro. Chicago: University of Chicago Press.
