= Regna Darnell =

Canadian anthropologist

Regna Darnell (born July 10, 1943) is an American-Canadian anthropologist and professor of Anthropology and First Nations Studies at the University of Western Ontario, where she has founded the First Nations Studies Program.

== Education ==
Darnell was born on July 10, 1943, in Cleveland. He studied at Bryn Mawr College, where she had received her B.A. in Anthropology and English in 1965. She continued to the University of Pennsylvania, where she initially earned her M.A. in 1967, followed by her Ph.D. in 1969. Darnell was awarded the honorary degree of D.Litt. from the University of Waterloo in 2009. She was a student of A. Irving Hallowell.

== Career and position ==
Darnell has conducted research/fieldwork in Saskatchewan, Northern Alberta, British Columbia, West Africa and Southern Ontario. Her career has displayed a focus towards language, Indigenous Knowledge, social change, mobility, traditional medicine, ecosystem health, identity and the history of anthropology. She was employed at the University of Alberta from 1969 to 1990, where she achieved the title of professor in 1979. She relocated to the University of Western Ontario, working as Chair of Anthropology from 1990 to 1993 and Director of the Center for Research and Teaching of Canadian Native Languages in 1992. Additionally, Darnell served as an educator affiliated in Women's Studies and Feminist Research.

Darnell remains incorporated in the centre for the Study of Theory and Criticism, in which she worked in cooperation with McMaster University from 1994 to 2010. She is also involved in numerous other disciplinary fields, including Environmental Health, Pathology, and worked in turn with the Schulich School of Medicine & Dentistry since 2006. Serving as a Bicentennial Professor for Canadian studies and Anthropology in 2000, this added further institutional experience with Pierson College.

== Recognition and awards ==
In early 2000, Darnell was awarded the Hellmuth Prize and was the first woman to gain this achievement. In 2004, she had received the Gene Weltfish Award for her service and contributions to anthropology. She received the Distinguished University Professor Award from the University of Western Ontario in 2005, which recognizes sustained excellence in scholarship over a substantial career at Western. Darnell has been awarded the 2005 Anthropological Association's Franz Boas Award for Exemplary Service to Anthropology. The American Philosophical Society elected Darnell in 2004 for her excellence in linguistics and anthropology. Darnell is also the recipient of the 2007 Premier's Distinction Award for the Social Science and Humanities and the 2021-2022 Lifetime Achievement Award from the American Society for Ethnohistory.

== Associations and societies ==
Darnell has previously resided as president of the Society for Humanistic Anthropology, the American Society of Ethnohistory, and the Northern American Association for the History of the Languages.

Darnell had chaired for the American Anthropological Associations Centennial Executive and Advisory Commissions in 2002. She served two terms as president of the University of Western Ontario Faculty Association, as well as a representative for faculty on the UWO Board of Governors between 2011 and 2015. She is one of five fellows for the Royal Society of Canada, as well as a member of the American Philosophical Society.

== Bibliography ==
- Darnell, Regna. (1971) Linguistic diversity in Canadian society, Vol. 11. Edmonton; Champaign, IL: Linguistic Research.
- Darnell, Regna. (1971) "The professionalization of American anthropology: A case study in the sociology of knowledge." Social Science Information 10.2: 83–103.
- Darnell, Regna. (1974) "Correlates of Cree narrative performance." Explorations in the ethnography of speaking, ed. by Richard Baumann and Joel Sherzer, pp. 315–336.
- Darnell, Regna (1988) Daniel Garrison Brinton: The "Fearless Critic" of Philadelphia. Philadelphia: University of Pennsylvania Department of Anthropology.
- Darnell, Regna (1990) Edward Sapir: Linguist, Anthropologist, Humanist. Berkeley: University of California Press.
- Darnell, Regna. (1990) "Franz Boas, Edward Sapir, and the Americanist text tradition." Historiographia linguistica 17.1-2: 129–144.
- Darnell, Regna (1998) And Along Came Boas: Continuity and Revolution in Americanist Anthropology. John Benjamins Publishing Company.
- Darnel, Regna (1999) Theorizing the Americanist Tradition. University of Toronto Press.
- Darnell, Regna (2001) Invisible Genealogies: A History of American Anthropology. Lincoln: University of Nebraska Press.
- Darnell, Regna. (2002) "Occupation is not a Cross‐Cultural Universal: Some Reflections From an Ethnographer." Journal of Occupational Science 9.1: 5–11.
- Darnell, Regna (2006) "Keeping the Faith: A Legacy of Native American Ethnography, Ethnohistory, and Psychology." In: New Perspectives on Native North America: Cultures, Histories, and Representations, ed. by Sergei A. Kan and Pauline Turner Strong, pp. 3–16. Lincoln: University of Nebraska Press.
- Darnell, Regna (2010) Edward Sapir: Linguist, Anthropologist, Humanist. University of Nebraska Press.
- Darnell, Regna. The History of Anthropology: A Critical Window on the Discipline in North America. Lincoln: University of Nebraska Press, 2021. 398 pages. ISBN 1496224175.

== Summaries ==
=== Invisible Genealogies (2001) ===
Invisible Genealogies surrounds the theoretical and historical contexts of anthropology in academia through the course of its existence in North America. This self-reflexive publication analyzes the indigenous population of North American in correlation to anthropology, as well as the incorporation of various renowned anthropologists such as Franz Boas, Clifford Geertz and Claude Levi-Strauss.

=== Edward Sapir: Linguist, Anthropologist, Humanist (2010) ===
This biographical novel surrounds the process, approaches and methodologies undergone by linguist Edward Sapir. This entails his research findings, incorporation of fieldwork, and associated theoretical framework included within his experiences. These are correlated to Darnell's own, including her personal perspectives and experiences in relation.

=== Theorizing the American Tradition (1999) ===
This collection of articles produced by over 25 prestigious anthropologists comprises a novel summarizing contemporary perspectives on the contributions of anthropology as a discipline. The book surrounds the history of anthropology, linguistics, and Native American past.
