= Museum Anthropology Review =

- Discipline: Anthropology
- Language: English
- Edited by: Jason Baird Jackson

Publication details
- History: 2007–present
- Publisher: Indiana University Press for the Mathers Museum of World Cultures (United States)
- Frequency: Biannually
- Open access: Yes
- License: CC-BY-NC-SA

Standard abbreviations
- ISO 4: Mus. Anthropol. Rev.

Indexing
- ISSN: 1938-5145
- LCCN: 2007212173
- OCLC no.: 137237269

Links
- Journal homepage

Museum Anthropology Review is a peer-reviewed gold open access academic journal focusing on research in material culture studies, museum-based scholarship, and the study of museums in society. In addition to anthropology, it covers the fields of folklore, art history, and museum studies. It was established in 2007 and is published for the Mathers Museum of World Cultures by the Indiana University Bloomington Libraries as part of its IUScholarWorks program using Open Journal Systems. The journal is edited by Jason Baird Jackson.
