= Greg Urban =

American anthropologist

Greg Urban is an American anthropologist who specializes in indigenous peoples of South America and on general theoretical problems in linguistic and cultural anthropology. Much of his work has been oriented toward the development of a discourse-centered theory of culture. Urban is the Arthur Hobson Quinn Professor of Anthropology at the University of Pennsylvania.

He received his Ph.D. from the University of Chicago, where he studied with Raymond D. Fogelson.

== Bibliography ==
- Urban, Greg, ed. (2014) Corporations and Citizenship. Philadelphia: University of Pennsylvania Press.
- Urban, Greg, and Kyung-Nan Koh (2013) "Ethnographic Research on Modern Business Corporations". Annual Review of Anthropology 42 (1):139-158.
- Urban, Greg (2010) "A Method for Measuring the Motion of Culture". American Anthropologist 112 (1):122-139.
- Urban, Greg, Ernest Baskin, and Kyung-Nan Koh (2007) "“No Carry-Over Parts”: Corporations and the Metaculture of Newness". Suomen Antropologi: Journal of the Finnish Anthropological Society 32 (1):5-19.
- Urban, Greg (2006) "Metasemiosis and Metapragmatics". In Encyclopedia of Language and Linguistics, edited by Keith Brown, 88–91. Oxford: Pergamon Press.
- Urban, Greg (2006) "Power as the Transmission of Culture". In New Perspectives on Native North America: Cultures, Histories, and Representations, edited by Sergei A. Kan and Pauline Turner Strong. Lincoln: University of Nebraska Press.
- Urban, Greg (2002) "Metasignaling and Language Origins". American Anthropologist 104 (1):233-246.
- Urban, Greg (2001) Metaculture: How Culture Moves through the World. Minneapolis: University of Minnesota Press.
- Urban, Greg, and Kristin M. Smith (1998) "The Sunny Tropics of 'Dialogue'?" Semiotica 121 (3/4):263-281.
- Urban, Greg (1996) Metaphysical Community: The Interplay of the Senses and the Intellect. Austin: University of Texas Press.
- Silverstein, Michael, and Greg Urban, eds. (1996) Natural Histories of Discourse. Chicago: University of Chicago Press.
- Urban, Greg (1996) "Entextualization, Replication, and Power". In Natural Histories of Discourse, edited by Michael Silverstein and Greg Urban, 21–44. Chicago: University of Chicago Press.
- Urban, Greg (1993) "The Represented Functions of Speech in Shokleng Myth". In Reflexive Language: Reported Speech and Metapragmatics, edited by John A. Lucy, 241–259. Cambridge: Cambridge University Press.
- Urban, Greg, and Joel Sherzer, eds. (1991) Nation-states and Indians in Latin America. Austin: University of Texas Press.
- Lee, Benjamin, and Greg Urban, eds. (1989) Semiotics, Self, and Society. Berlin: Mouton de Gruyter.
- Urban, Greg (1988) "Ritual wailing in Amerindian Brazil". American Anthropologist 90 (2):385-400.
- Urban, Greg (1986) "Linguistic Consciousness and Allophonic Variation: A Semiotic Perspective". Semiotica 61 (1–2):33-60.
- Urban, Greg (1985) "The Semiotics of Two Speech Styles in Shokleng". In Semiotic Mediation, edited by Elizabeth Mertz and Richard J. Parmentier, 311–329. New York: Academic Press.
- Urban, Greg (1985) "Ergativity and Accusativity in Shokleng (Gê)". International Journal of American Linguistics 51 (2):164-187.
- Urban, Greg (1984) "Speech about Speech in Speech about Action". The Journal of American Folklore 97 (385):310-328.
- Urban, Greg (1981) "Agent- and Patient-Centricity in Myth". The Journal of American Folklore 94 (373):323-344.
