= José Villa Soberón =

Cuban artist (born 1950)

José Ramón Villa Soberón (Spanish pronunciation: [xoˈse ˈβiʝa soβeˈɾon]; born September 2, 1950, Santiago de Cuba, Cuba) is a Cuban artist, particularly known for his public sculptures around Havana. He studied at the Escuela Nacional de Arte (English: The National School of Art) in Havana, Cuba and the Academy of Plastic Arts in Prague. He is a professor at the Instituto Superior de Arte in Havana. His sculptures, paintings, engravings, drawings and designs are held by the Museo Nacional de Bellas Artes de La Habana, and in 1996 he was one of the selected artist in the second Trienal Americana de Escultura in Argentina.

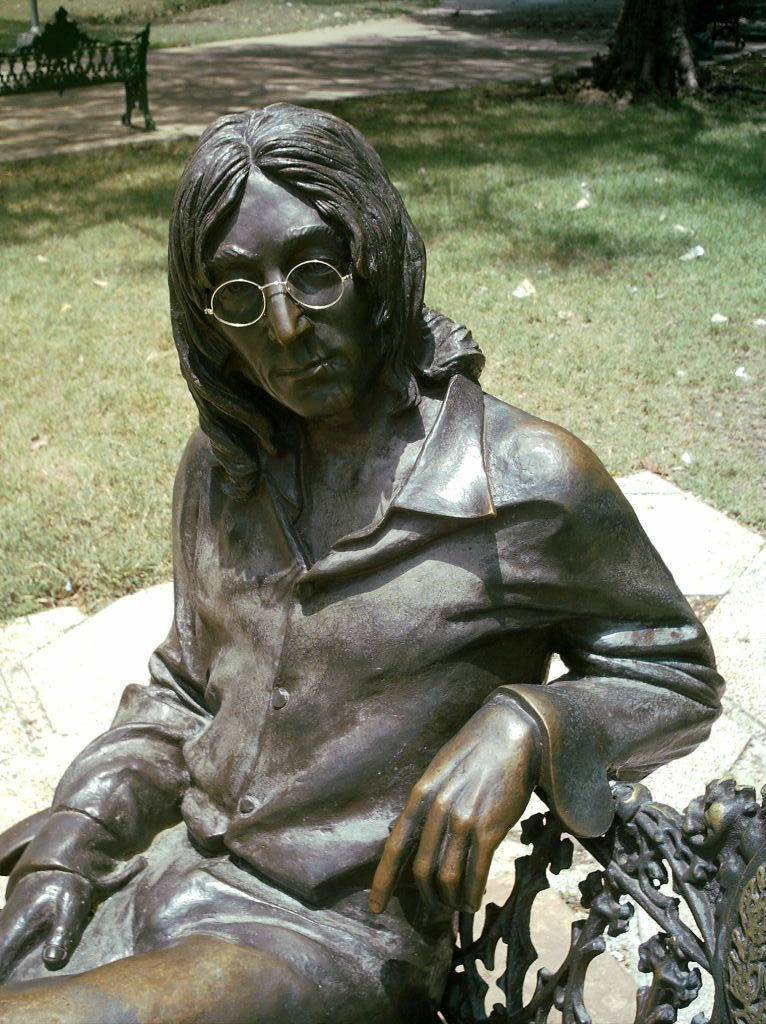
John Lennon

His artwork has been part of many collective exhibitions. In 1969 he was included in the collective exhibitions of painting and esculpture Exposición Escuela Nacional de Arte in the Centro de Arte Internacional, Havana, Cuba. In 1971, he participated in the Salón Nacional para Artistas Jóvenes.

== Awards ==
His awards include the Third Prize in the Salón de Profesores e Instructores de Artes Plásticas, Escuela Nacional de Arte (1973); Mention in Sculpture in the VII Salón Nacional Juvenil de Artes Plásticas, Museo Nacional de Bellas Artes (1978); and First Prize in the II Trienal Americana de Escultura, Argentina (1996).

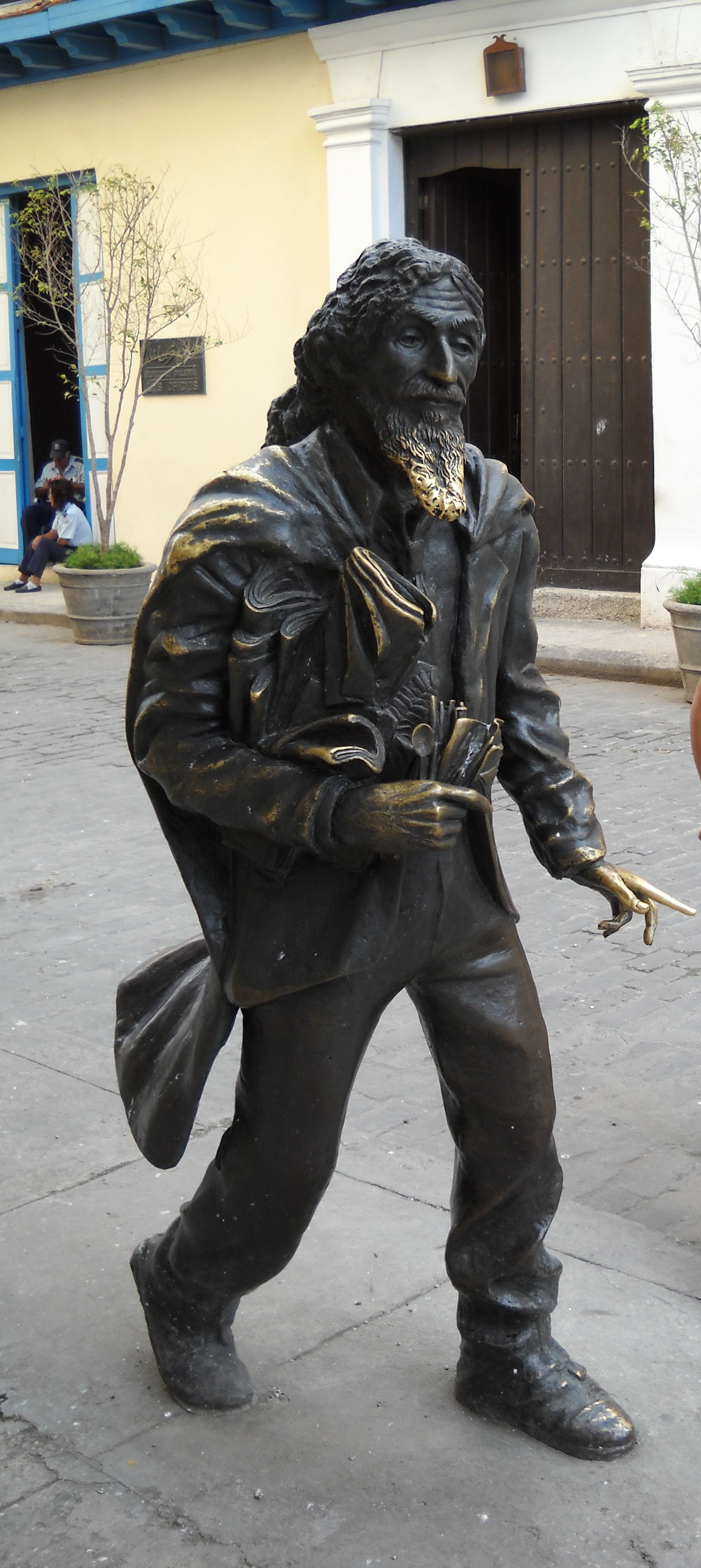
"El Caballero de Paris"

== Public sculpture ==
The artist is noted for his public sculptures around Havana. These include statues of Ernest Hemingway (2003, sitting on a barstool in the Floridita bar and restaurant), Che Guevara (1982, Palacio Central de Pioneros Ernesto Che Guevara, Parque Lenin), and John Lennon (2000, John Lennon Park, Vedado, Havana). In 2001 his statue of José María López Lledín, a local vagabond dubbed the "Gentleman from Paris" (El Caballero de Paris), was placed outside Basilica Menor de San Francisco de Asis, and is stroked by visitors for good luck.

His 1986 Monumento a Martí (José Villa y Rómulo Fernández) is in the Plaza de Quito, Paseo de la Habana, Madrid, Spain. In 1992 he made Escultura ambiental, in the Campus de la Universidad de Valencia, Spain. In that year he also made the one Escultura ambiental, in the Exteriores del Museo de Bellas Artes, Santiago de Chile, Chile.
