= Umbrella Square =

- People's commune
- {{{other_names}}}
- 雨傘廣場
- Nickname: Umbrella Plaza
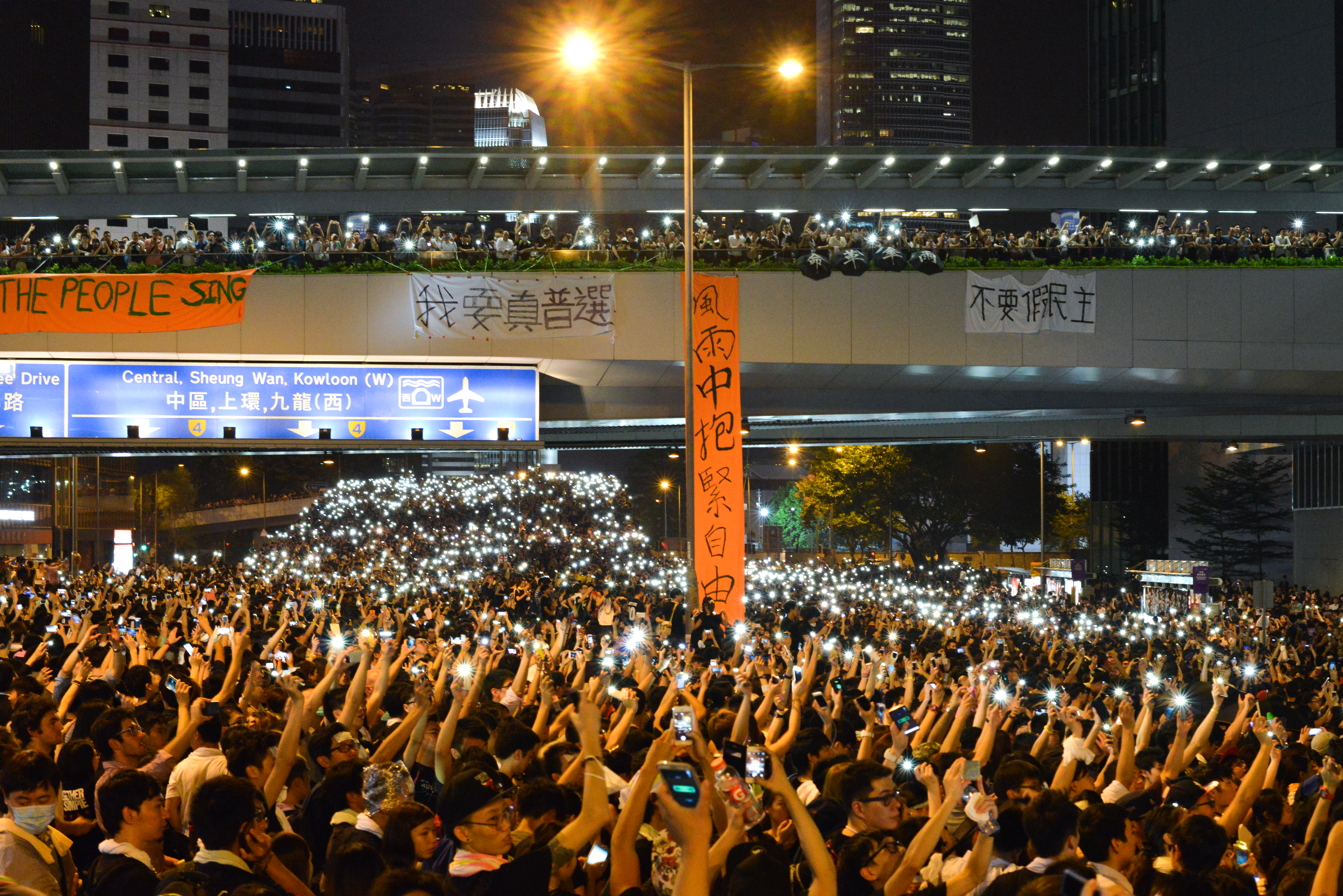
- Umbrella Square on 29 September 2014
- Location: Hong Kong
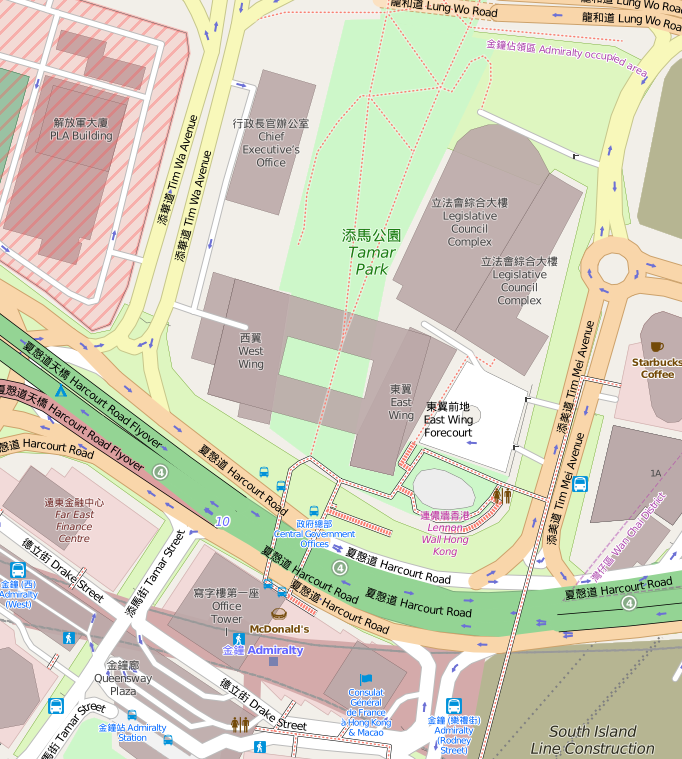
- Map of the Umbrella Square
- Coordinates: 22.2795155°N 114.164129°E

Umbrella Square (Chinese: 雨傘廣場), also called Umbrella Plaza, describes a large roadway in Admiralty, Hong Kong occupied by protesters during the Umbrella Movement protests in September 2014. On 11 December 2014, after 74 days of occupation, the area was cleared by the police and reopened to motorised traffic.

== Origin ==
The area became completely pedestrianised area after the 28 September 2014, when the Hong Kong police decided to employ tear gas against peaceful protesters. The use of teargas by the police brought hundreds of thousands of people to the area.

== Geography and delimitation ==
Umbrella Square comprised virtually the entire lengths of Harcourt Road, and Tim Mei Avenue. There were barricades on each end and on roads leading to or off both roads, numbering 21 in total.

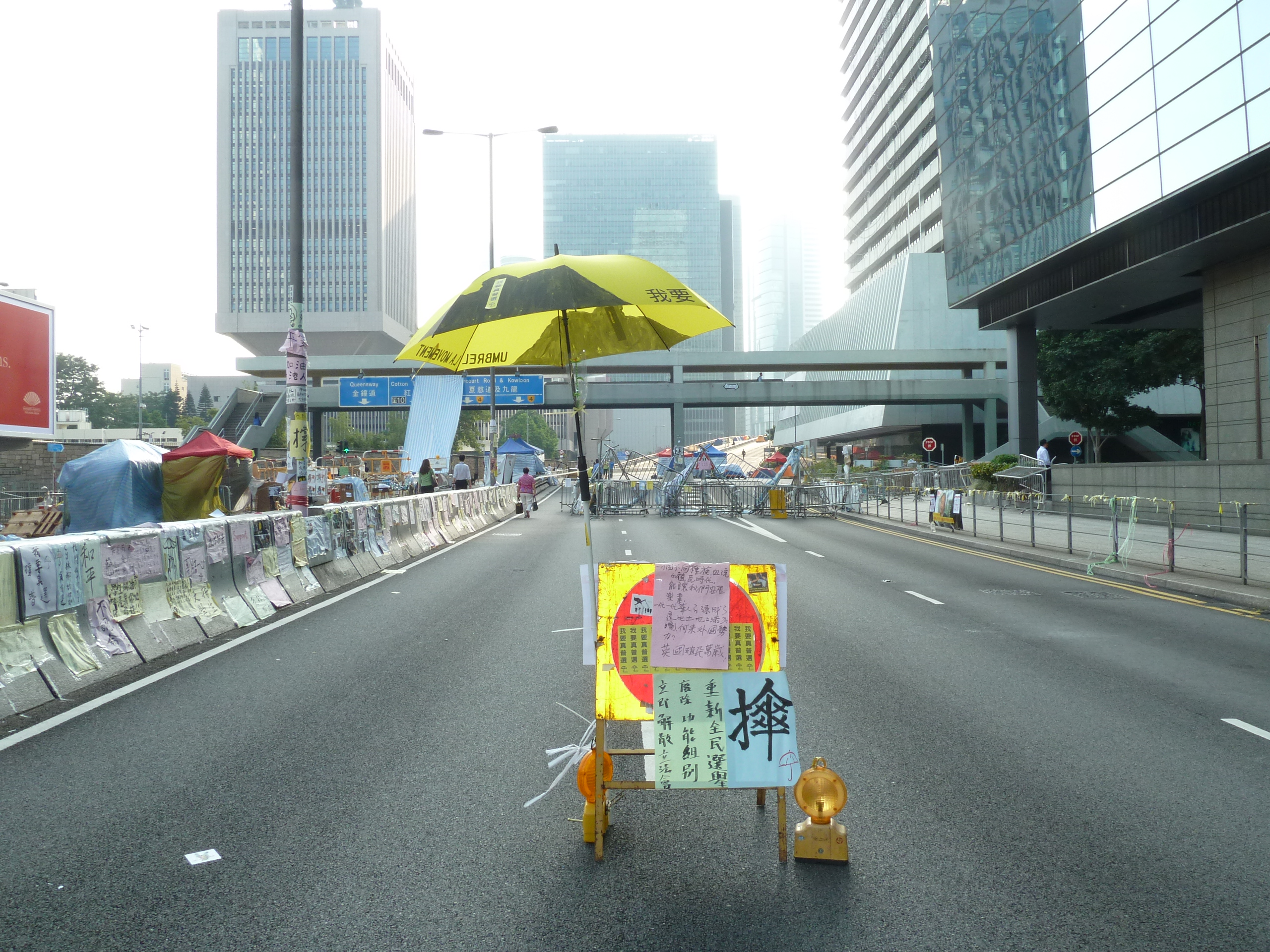
Outpost at Connaught Road

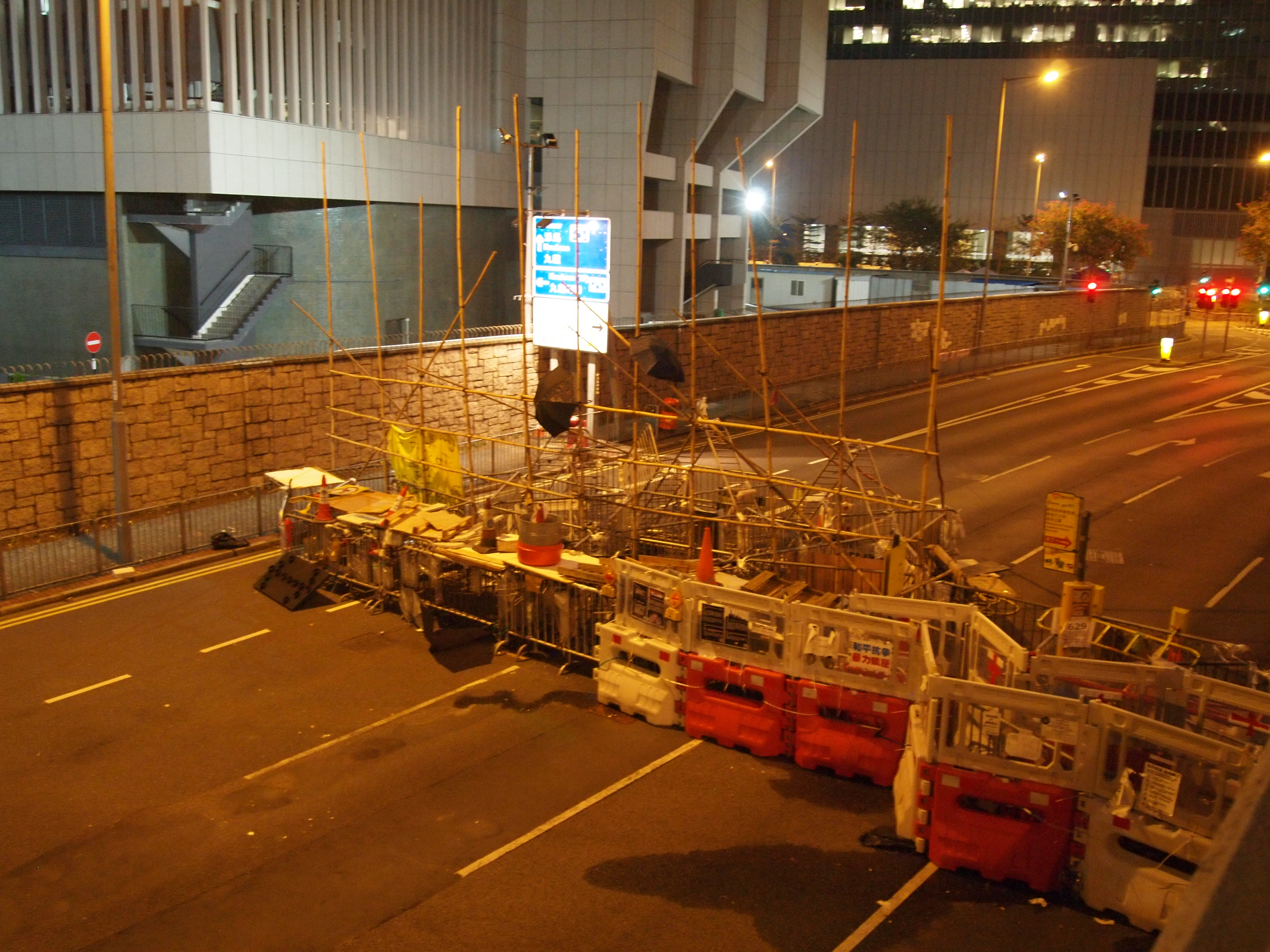
Barricade reinforced with bamboo scaffolds in front of PLA building

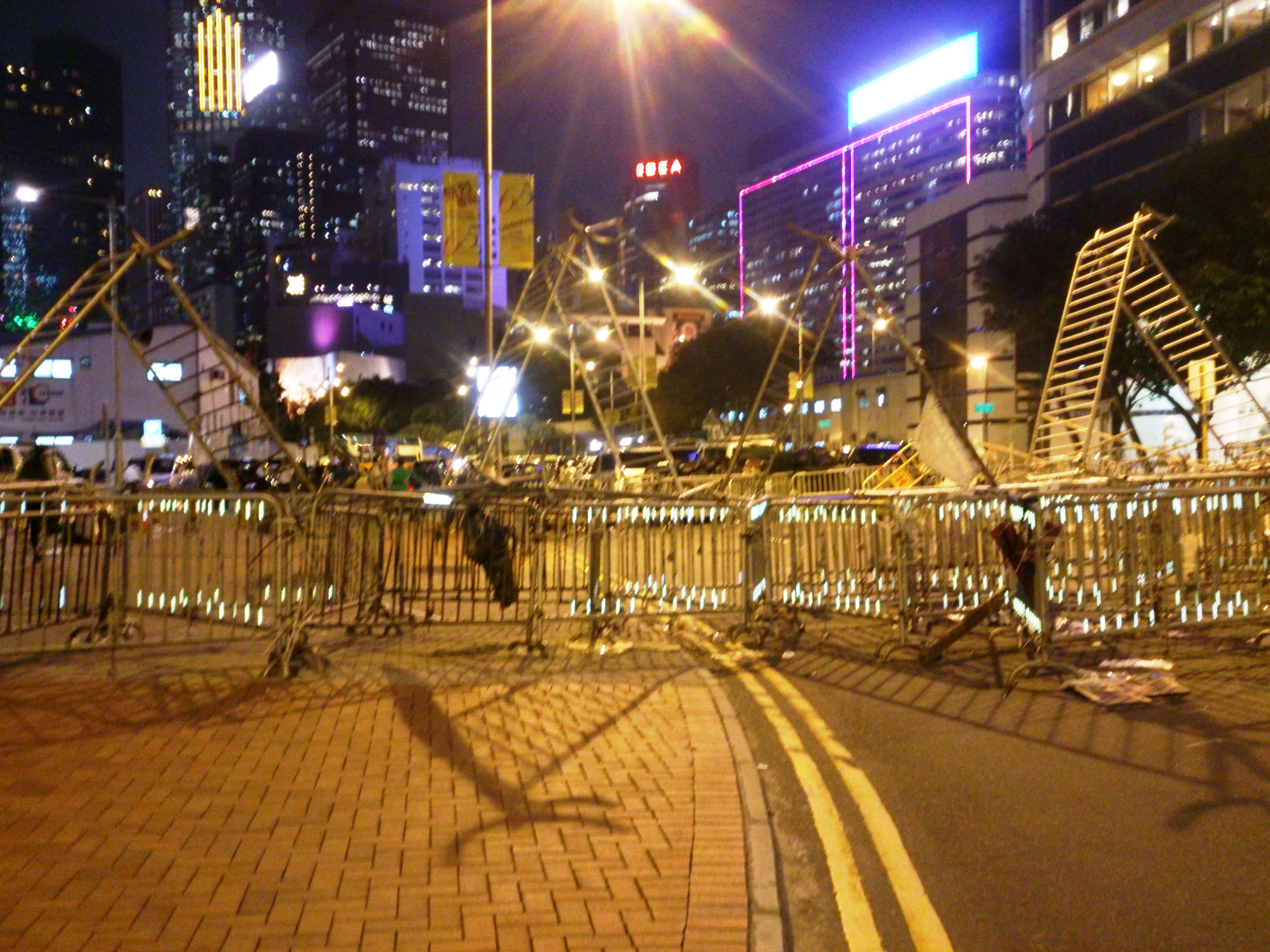
On Lung Wui Road near CITIC Tower

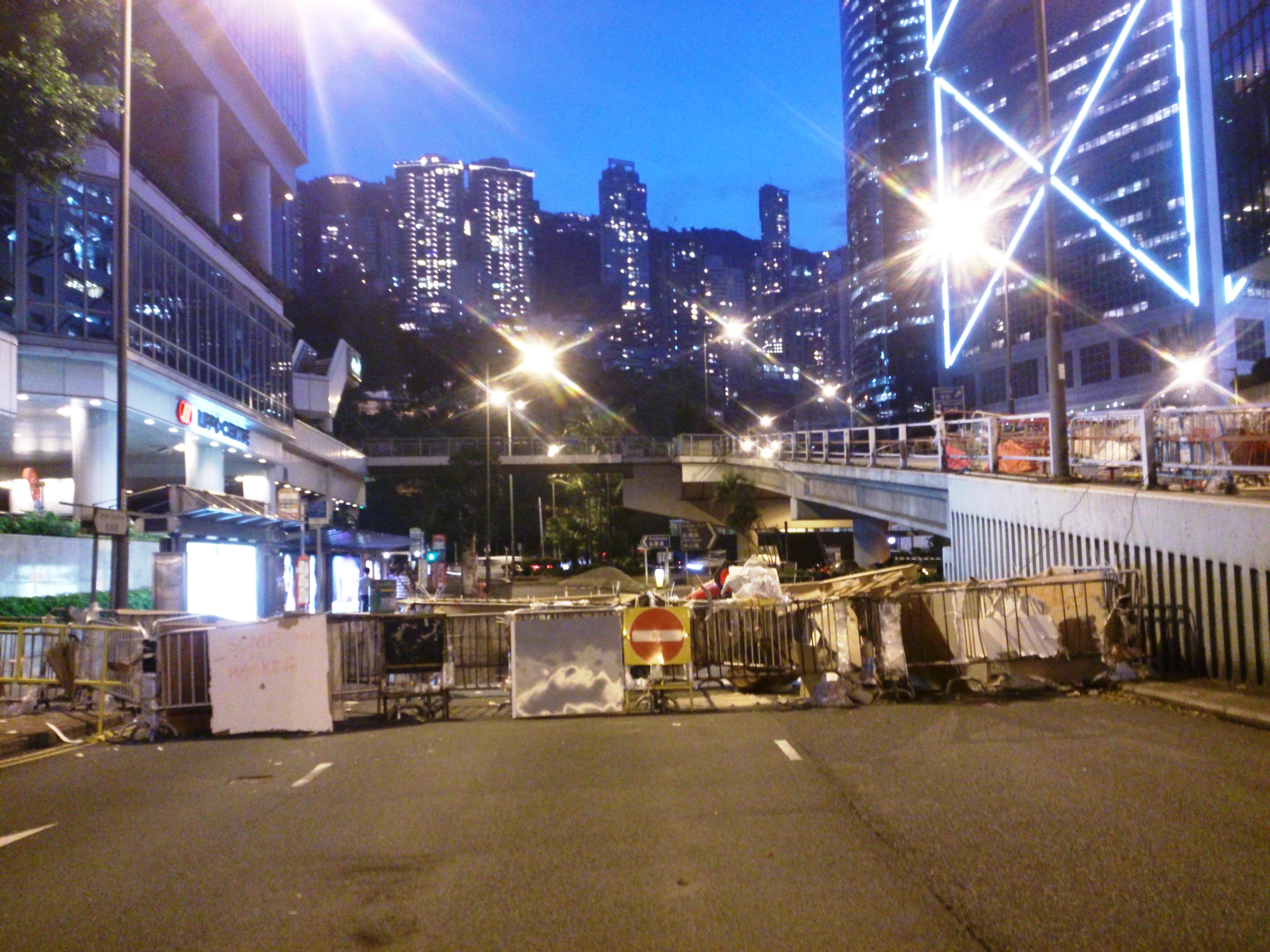
On Cotton Tree Drive

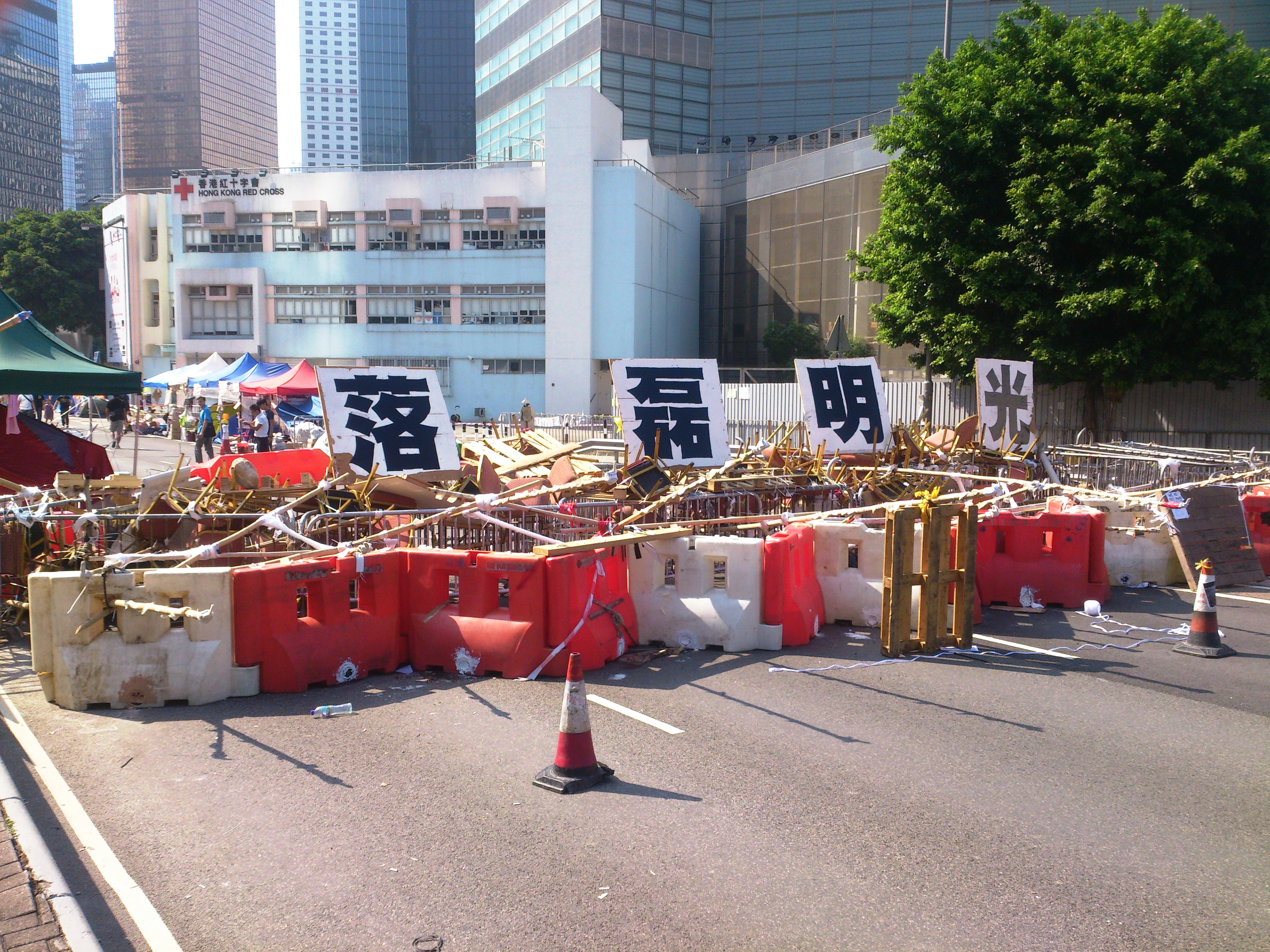
On Harcourt Road near Arsenal Street

Initially an informal term by the occupiers, "Umbrella Square" became a recognised name as people continued to occupy the site. The name became incorporated into maps. During the 2014 Hong Kong protests the area was home to around 2,000 tents of varying sizes, many of which were given addresses by the residents. It was reported that postal services delivered to Umbrella Square tent addresses, although the Hong Kong Post officially denies having done so.

== Culture ==
Jonathan Kaiman of The Guardian described Umbrella Square as a "high-functioning utopian collective blocked off by a handful of elaborate barricades". Upon entering, Kaiman observed that "the overwhelming feeling is one of entering an art fair, or a music festival – protesters sit on the pavement cross-legged, strumming guitars and checking their smartphones. During the day, tourists amble through the crowd, snapping photos with SLR cameras; at night, hundreds, sometimes thousands of supporters gather to hear speeches and performances."

Provisions (such as biscuits, soft drinks, toilet paper, face masks, and bottled water) were donated, and distributed to occupiers and visitors passing through.

== Facilities and infrastructure ==
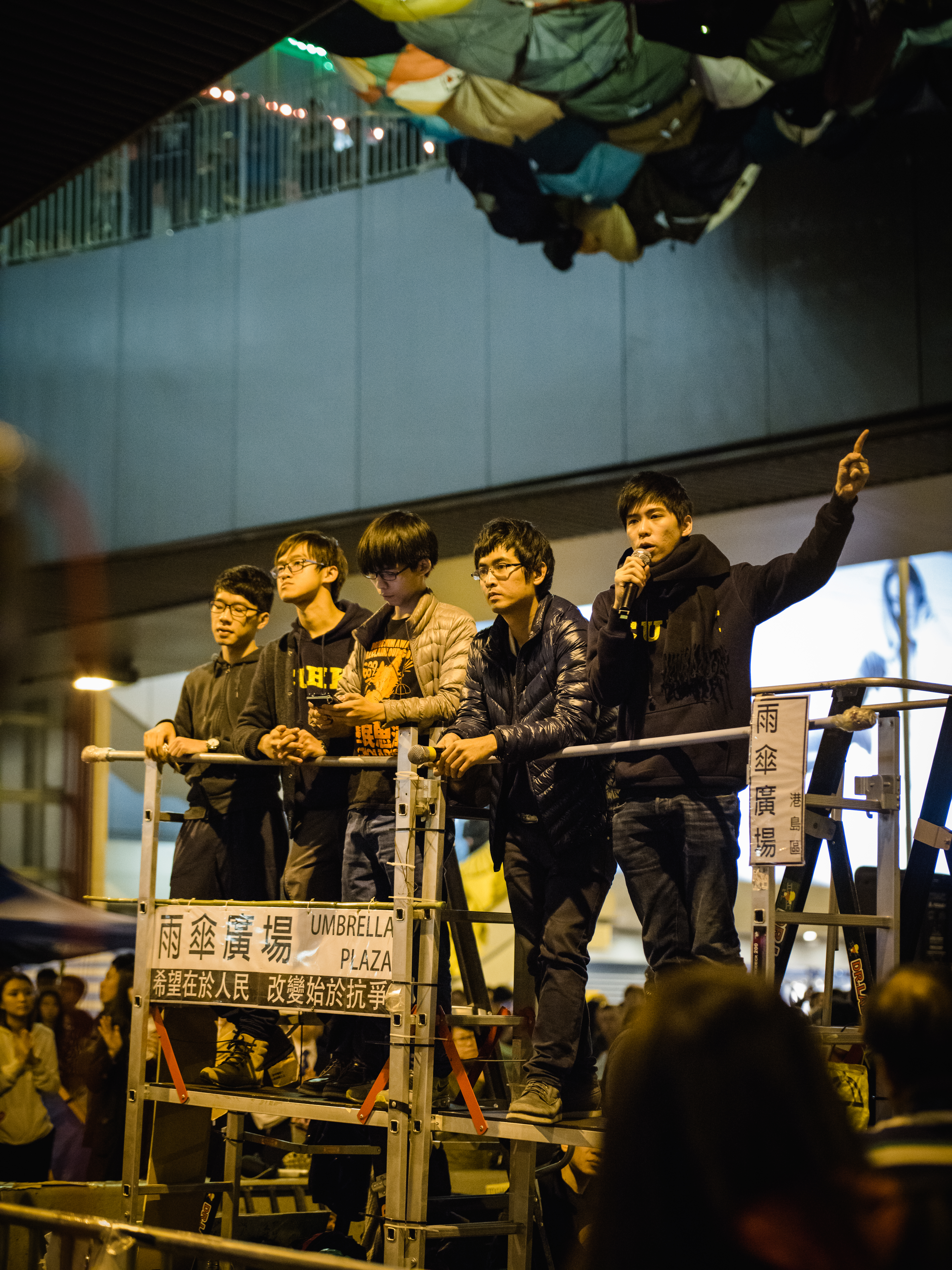
Students representatives on the podium on 11 December 2015, the eve of clearance of Umbrella Square

The public toilets in the vicinity were equally well-stocked with toiletries. Local architects have noted how the occupiers re-purposed the square from the roadway and adapted it to functional use; they created ad hoc architecture, such as barricades, supply infrastructure, recycling stations cinemas and libraries. Art and infrastructure was added on a constant basis. Showers were erected, along with composting and electrical charging stations. More than a hundred tents were available for rent, under condition that they be kept clean. In a workshop area, volunteer carpenters built steps, as well as desks and benches for students in the ad hoc study areas.

Notable areas included the Lennon Wall, the Study Zone, and Dark Corner – where the beating of a protester by seven police officers was captured on film and broadcast in a TVB news bulletin.

There was also a central podium where nightly talks and rallies were held, adjacent to which there was a press compound.

The encampments were referred to as "villages". Stickers and labels alluding to social change, freedom, and democracy were attached to road signs. Occupiers' flimsy tents were often given grandiose addresses such as "Umbrella Court" or "Democracy Gardens", parodying names given to luxury property developments in Hong Kong, an increasingly unaffordable city.

== Gallery ==
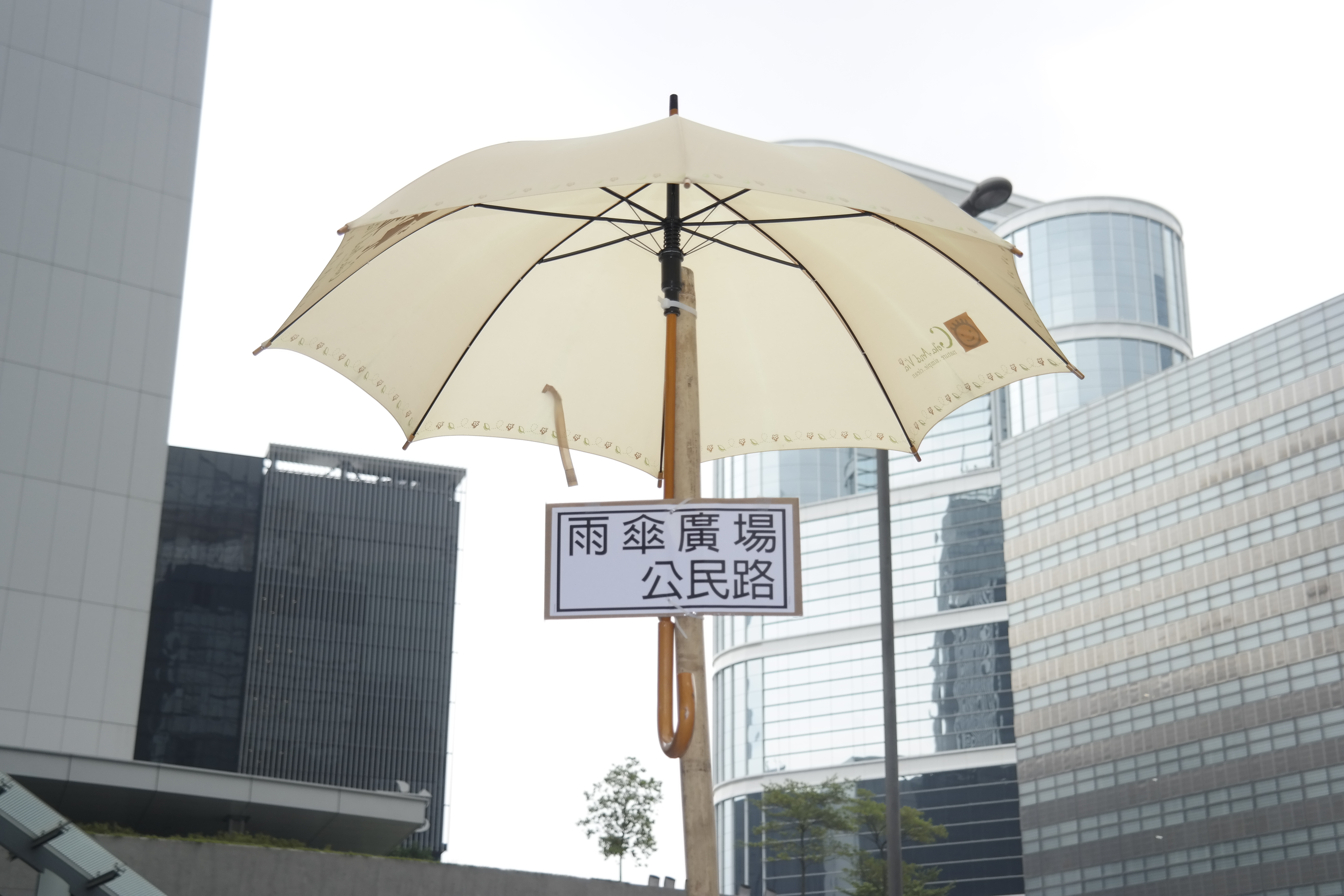
"Umbrella Square" road sign

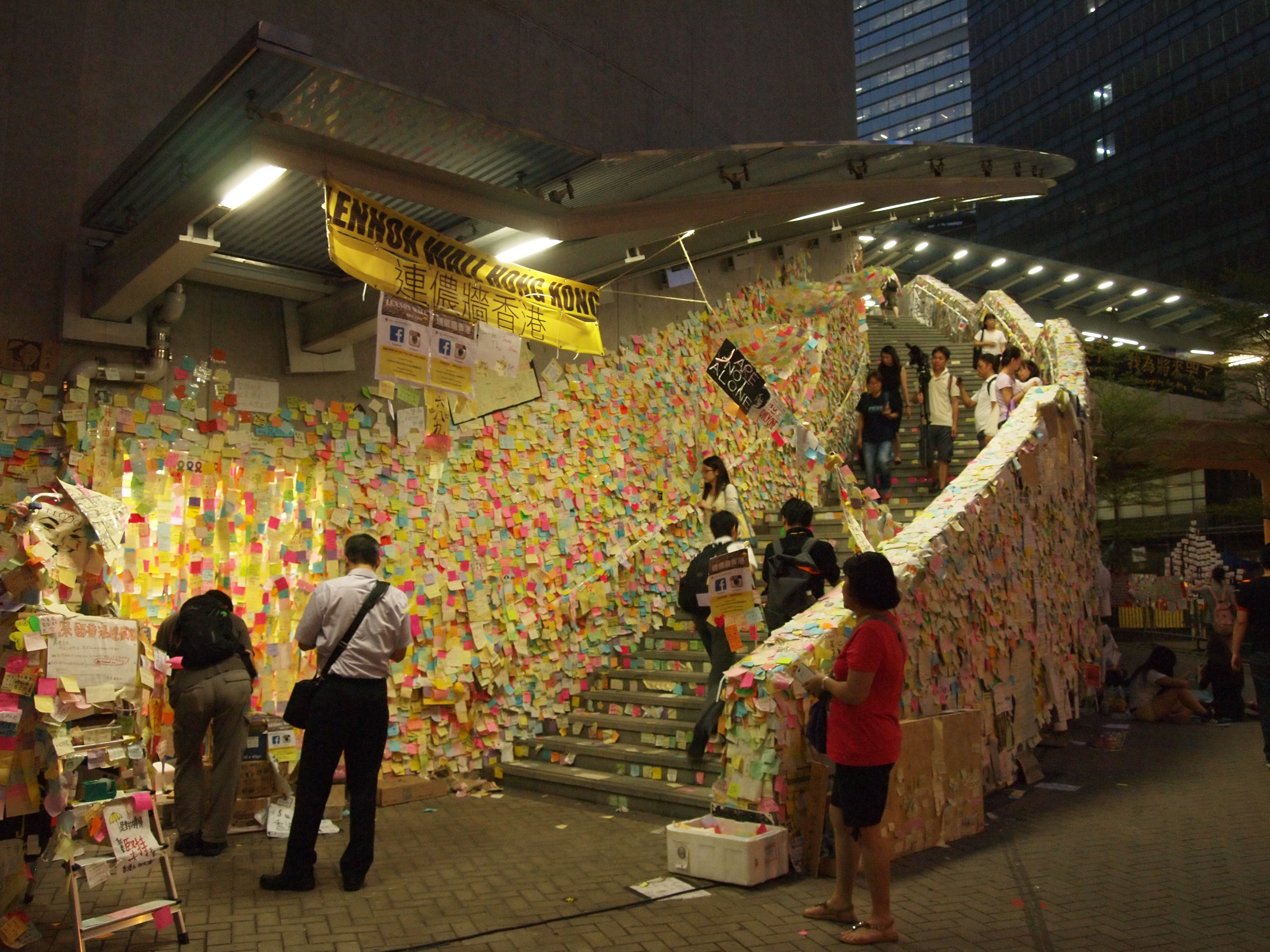
The Lennon Wall

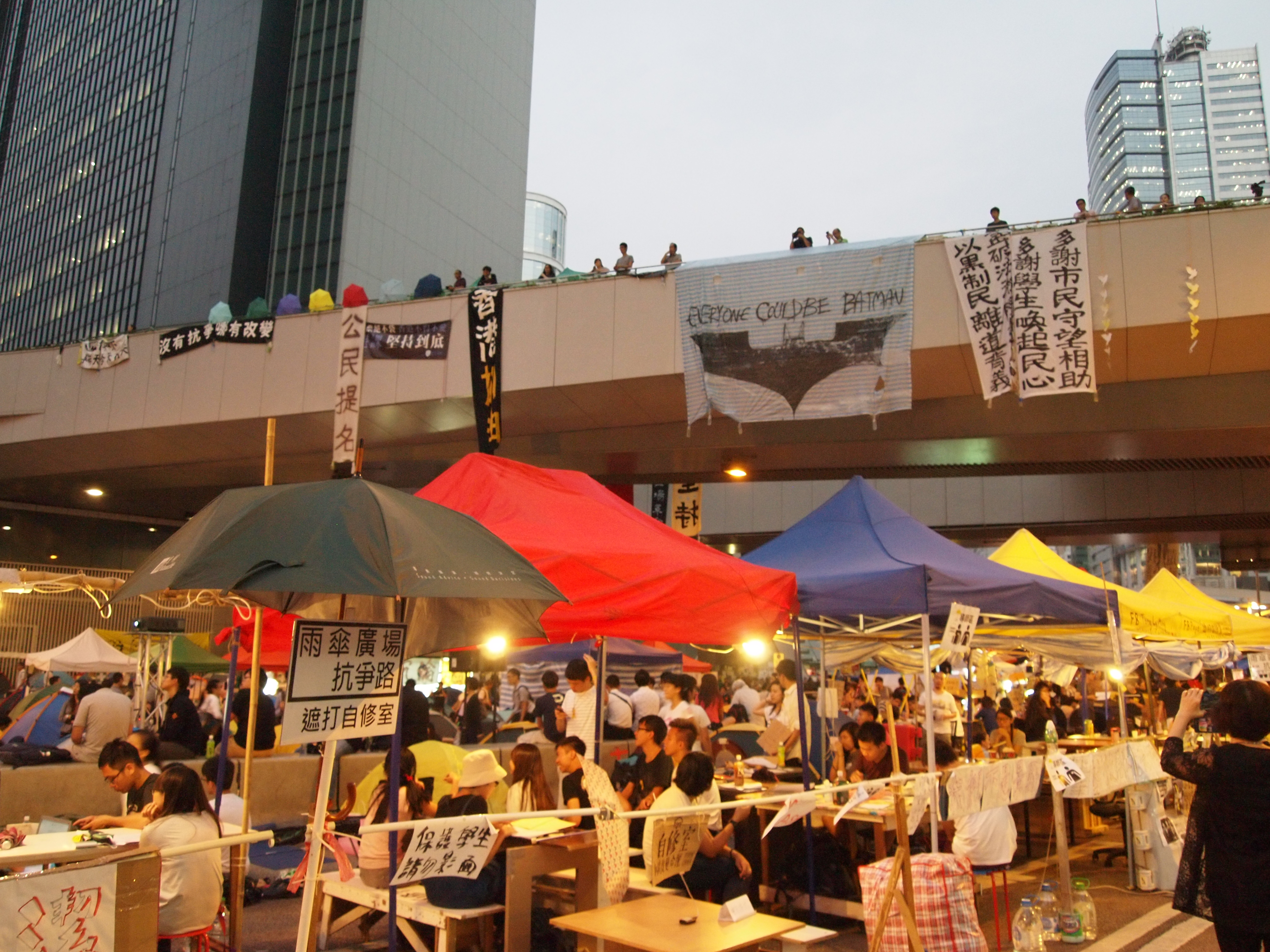
Study zone

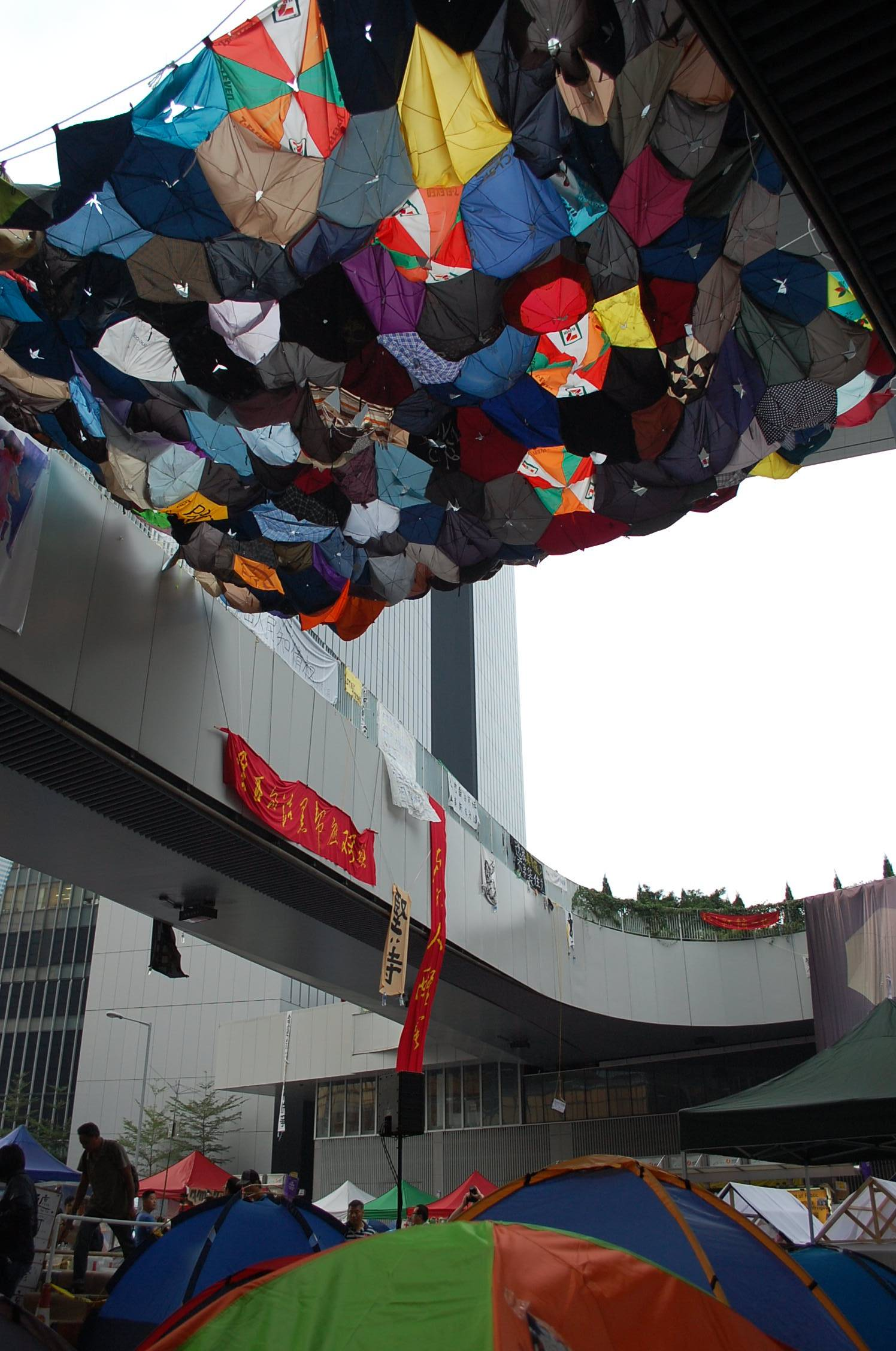
Patchwork canopy from umbrella fabric

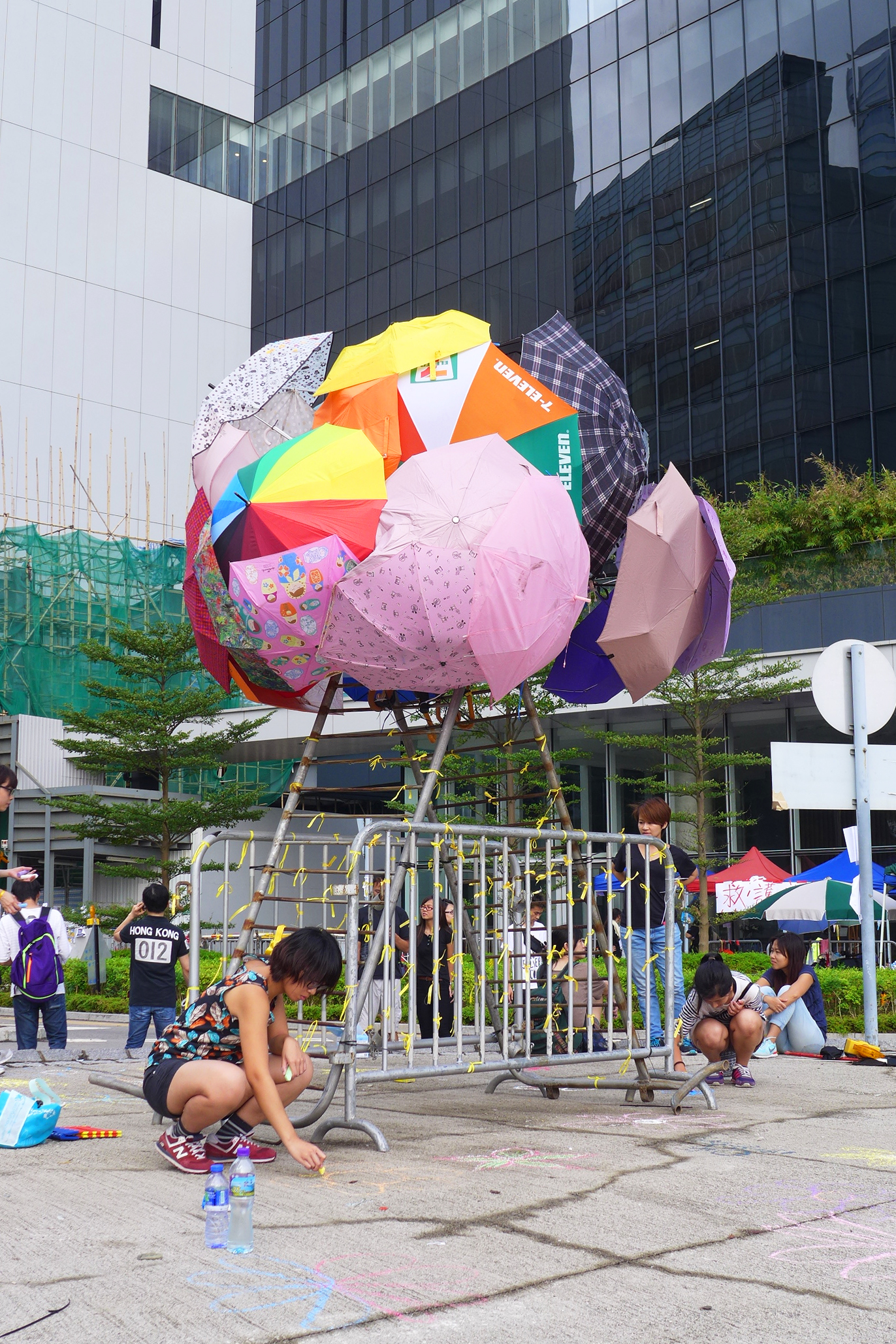
Installation on the Tim Mei Avenue roundabout

== Organisation ==
The movement was composed of many fractious groups, but had no leadership or formal organisation overall. However, colours and members of the Labour Party, Democratic Party, Civic Party, CTU, League of Social Democrats and People Power were regularly seen in Umbrella Square.

Time magazine described the organised chaos of the protest sites as "classical political anarchism: a self-organizing community that has no leader." Teams of volunteers working in shifts deal with garbage collection and recycling, security and medical care.

== See also ==
- Umbrella Movement protests
- Art of the Umbrella Movement
