= Lennon Wall =

Wall in Prague, Czech Republic

- Lennonova zeď
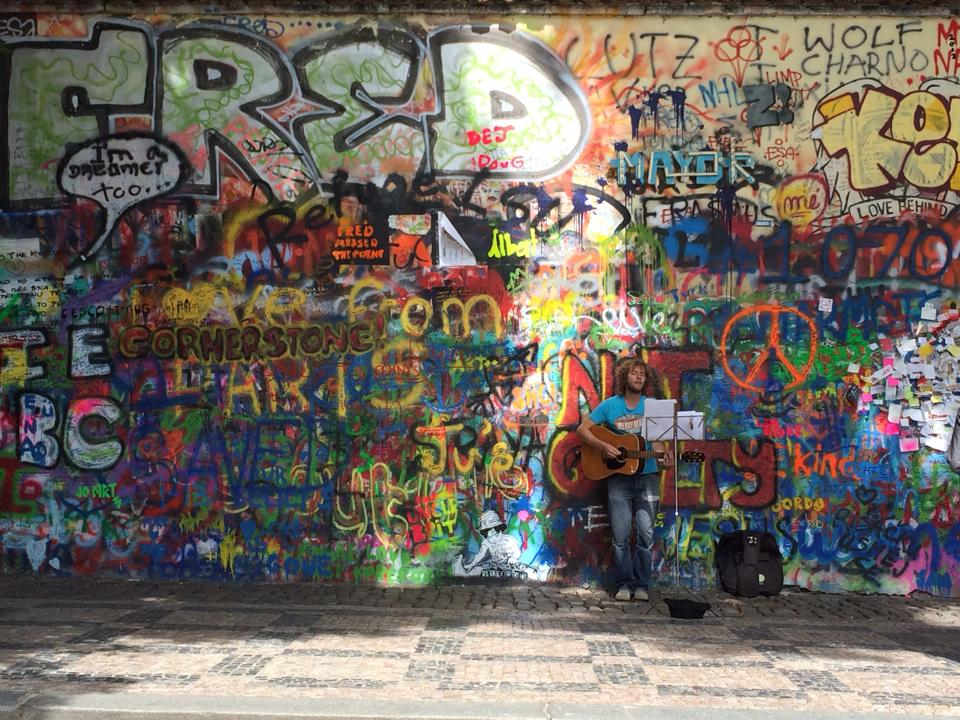
- The John Lennon Wall in the summer of 2014, shortly before it was painted over in November 2014.
- Alternative names: John Lennon Wall

General information
- Type: Wall
- Location: Prague, Czech Republic
- Coordinates: 50°5′10.47″N 14°24′25.01″E

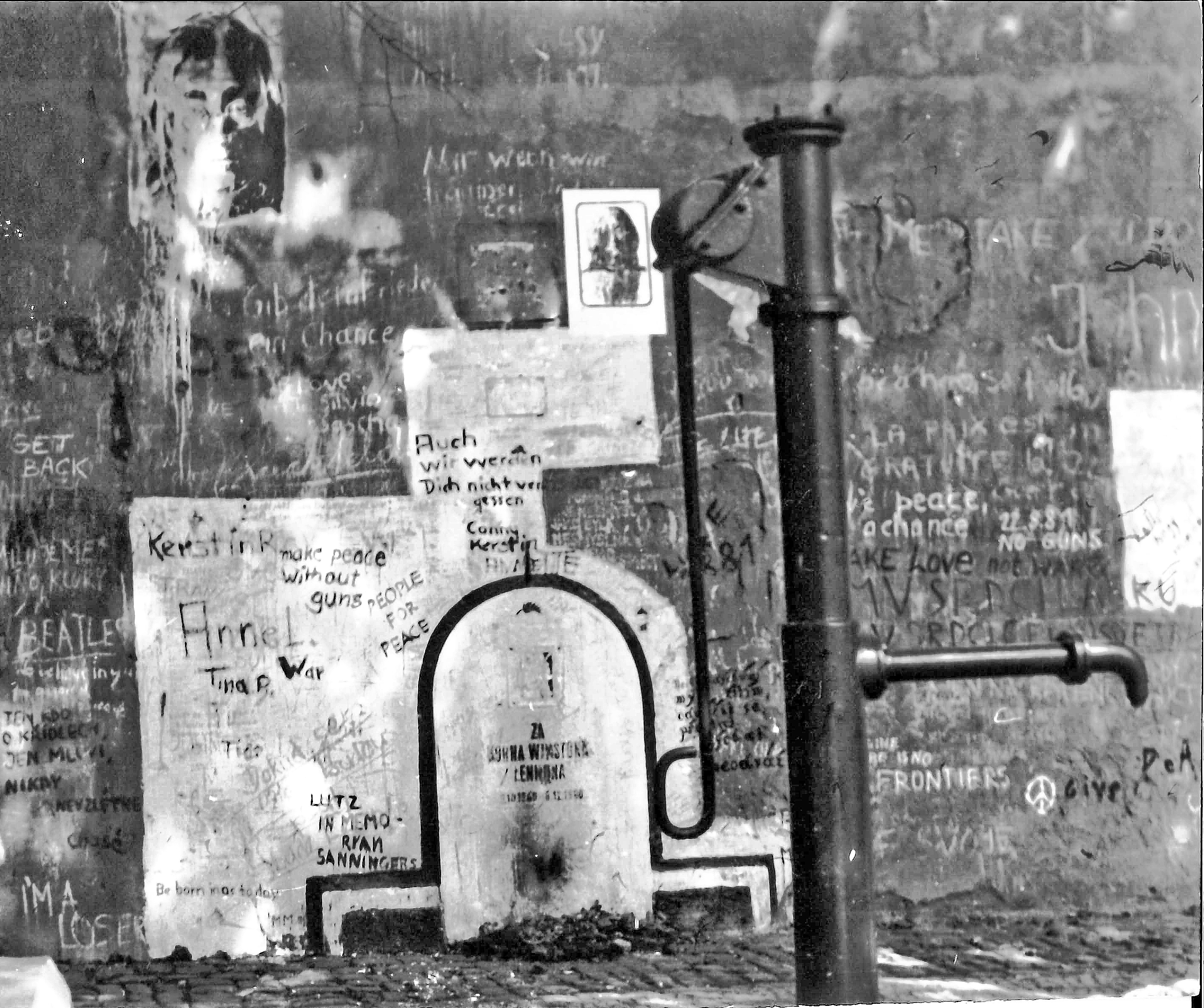
Lennon Wall in August 1981.

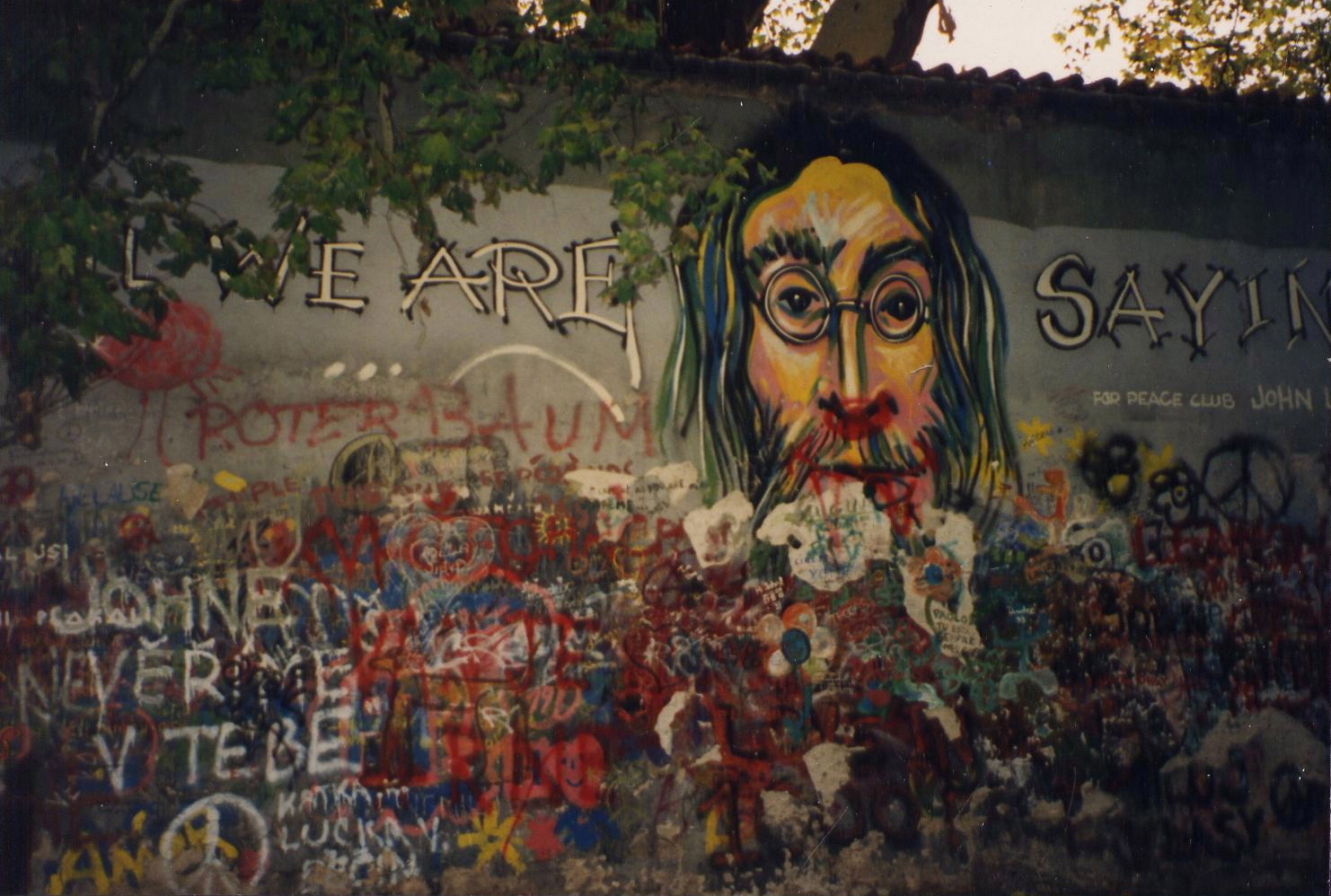
Portion of the wall, 1993.

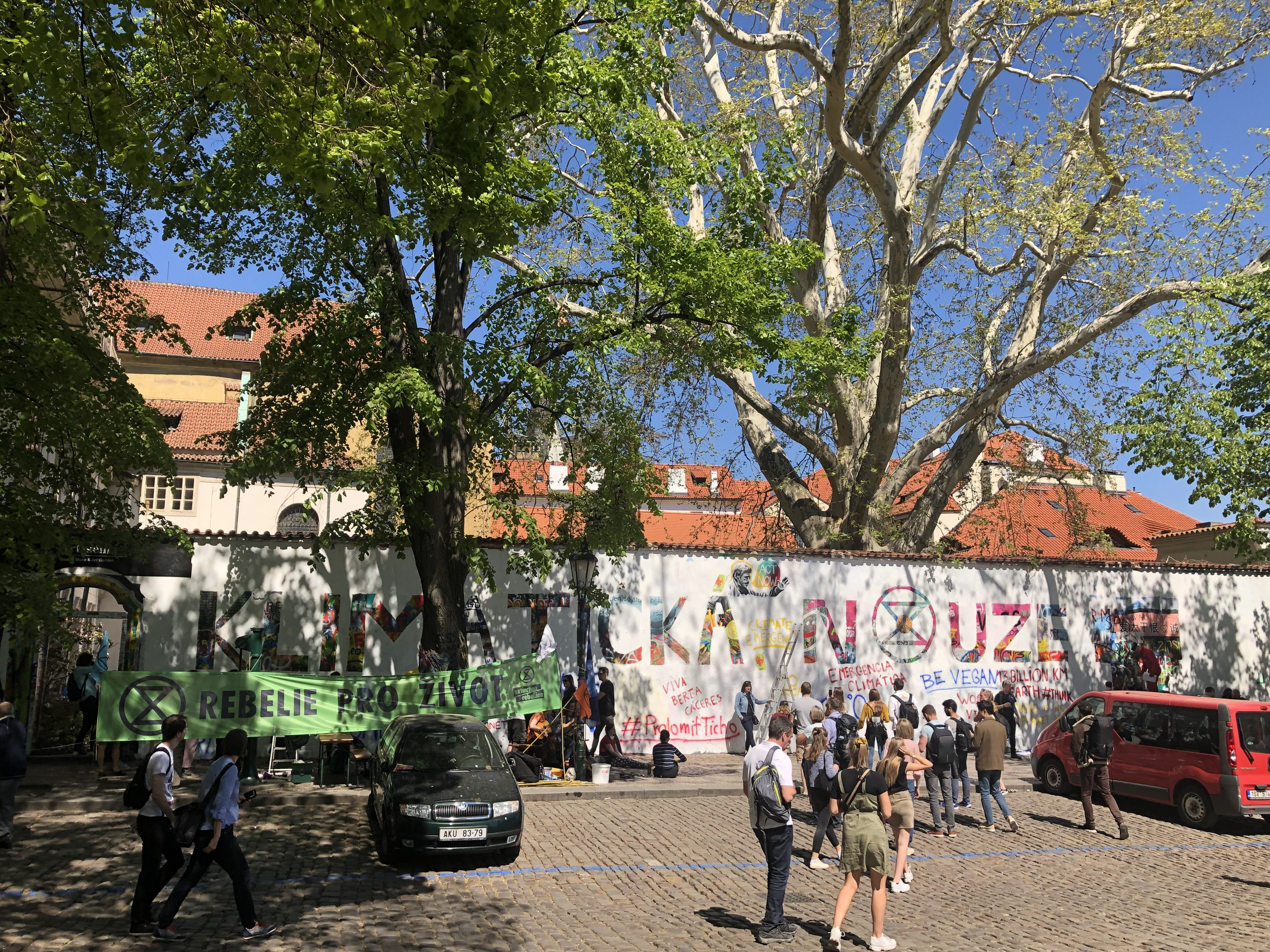
Extinction Rebellion mural, 2019.

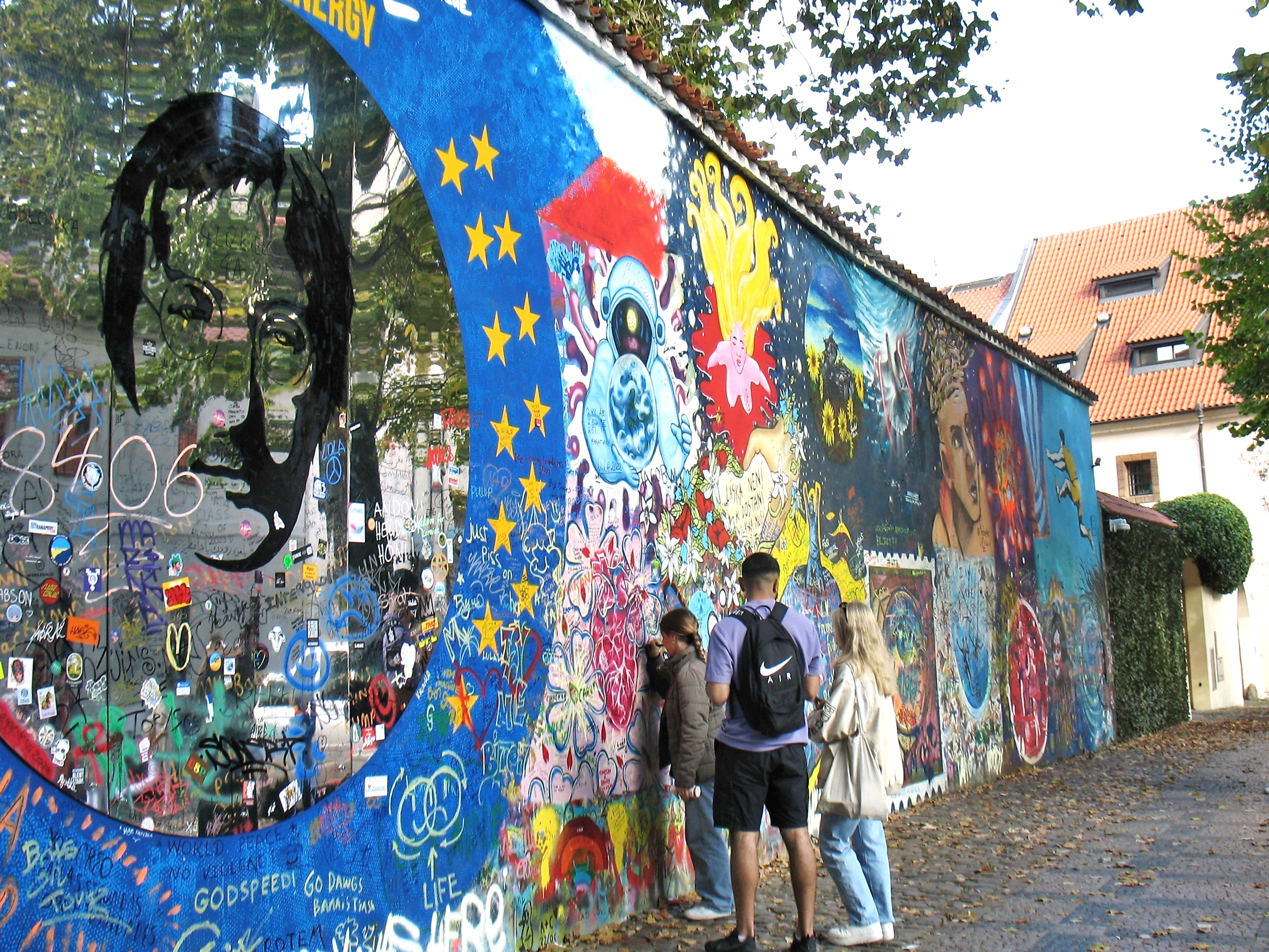
The Wall after a new repainting, October 2022

The Lennon Wall (Czech: Lennonova zeď ) or John Lennon Wall (Czech: Zeď Johna Lennona), located at Velkopřevorské náměstí (Grand Priory Square), Malá Strana, is a historic legal graffiti wall in Prague, Czechia. After the 1980 murder of John Lennon a mural of Lennon was painted by an unknown artist onto the wall and as more people expanded upon it, the wall slowly became a place for free expression of then communist Czechoslovakia. It has historically been used for demonstrations and carries a central theme of John Lennon, but it also features designs relating to local and global causes such as global warming. The wall has also inspired other walls across the globe, such as the Hong Kong Lennon wall.

The wall is owned by the Sovereign Military Order of Malta, which until 2019 allowed all graffiti. As of the latest reconstruction, the wall exists as a semi-legal graffiti wall; spray painting has been banned and only some areas of the wall are allowed to be used by the public.

== History ==
=== Under communist Czechoslovakia ===
Located in a secluded square across from the French Embassy, the wall had love poems and short messages against the communist Czechoslovak government since the 1960s, but the first message connected to John Lennon was painted following the 1980 assassination of Lennon, when an unknown artist painted a single image of the singer-songwriter and some lyrics onto a stone slab foundation of a former public fountain. Following this, a small memorial was created with candles, flowers, photographs and newspaper clippings talking about the murder. Western media was banned in the country at the time, therefore the image and memorial was seen by the authorities as representative of western culture and political resistance, thus in April 1981 it was painted over with green paint and removed by the Czechoslovak secret police who saw it as a protest against the government. The day after the wall was repainted it was filled with political messages, such as "Palach would cry", and poems once again. The wall would be repainted and re-graffiti-ed after that, with cameras and over-night guards being stationed at the wall to prevent further attempts, but this was ultimately fruitless as the wall would always end up being marked anyway.

In 1988, the wall was a source of irritation for Gustáv Husák's Marxist–Leninist government. Following a short-lived era of democratization and political liberalization known as the Prague Spring, the newly installed communist government dismantled the reforms, inspiring anger and resistance. Young Czechs wrote their grievances on the wall and, according to a report of the time, this led to a clash between hundreds of students and security police on the nearby Charles Bridge. The liberalization movement these students followed was described as Lennonism (not to be confused with Leninism), and Czech authorities described participants variously as alcoholic, mentally deranged, sociopathic, and agents of Western free market capitalism.

=== Post velvet revolution and contemporary developments ===
After the fall of the iron curtain and replacement of the communist government the wall continuously underwent change and the original portrait of Lennon was long lost under layers of new paint and graffiti.

On 17 November 2014, the 25th anniversary of the Velvet Revolution, a group of art students called Prážská Služba repainted the wall to white leaving a single line of black text, “wall is over” [sic]. The Knights of Malta initially filed a criminal complaint for vandalism against the students, which they later retracted after contacting them.

On 22 April 2019, Earth Day, the environmentalist group Extinction Rebellion repainted the wall as a demand for the Czech government to act on climate change. The wall was almost entirely painted white, with the unpainted parts of the wall reading in large, negative space, block print letters Klimatická Nouze (lit. 'Climate Emergency'). Members of the public were encouraged to add their messages, resulting in calls for action painted in several languages. A large image of a skull was also painted. The repaint was carried out in a manner which allowed some of the existing artwork to be included on the new wall.

In July 2019, artists painted a memorial on the wall for Hong Kong democracy activist Marco Leung Ling-kit, who became known as a martyr and a symbol of hope for the 2019 anti-extradition bill protest movement. The image on the wall depicts the yellow raincoat he was wearing during the banner drop that eventually led to a fall from the building, along with some words of solidarity: “Hong Kong, Add oil.”

In October 2019, the Sovereign Military Order of Malta and the administrative district of Prague 1 started a reconstruction of the Lennon Wall. A representative of the Order of Malta, Johannes Lobkowicz, in regards to why the wall would be renovated, said "Our goal was to stop the wall from being a cheap tourist attraction, where anyone could draw nonsense or vulgarisms. It wasn't a dignified state [for the wall]". Under the direction of Czech designer Pavel Šťastný over 30 Czech and foreign professional artists painted the wall with new designs. During the renovation a central piece made of reflective metal with a black outline of John Lennon was also installed. The wall opened to the public on the 30th anniversary of the Velvet Revolution, 7 November 2019, as an open-air gallery with new rules - busking and spraying was banned, marking the wall was now only allowed in the designated white zones and in impermanent materials e.g. pencils, markers, or chalk. Police and cameras were stationed at the wall to deter further spray painting and rule breaking.

At the same time as the wall was being renovated the wall was also declared a memorial site, this being the first time the wall was given an officially recognized status as an important landmark.

In July 2021, a new museum about the history of the Lennon Wall, the Lennon Wall Story, was opened on Prokopská Street 8. The museum features varying objects related to the wall, such as photos, historic objects and Beatles memorabilia.

On 15 May 2024 the Romani artist Maxim Muchow added a portrait of the late Romani singer Věra Bílá to the wall.

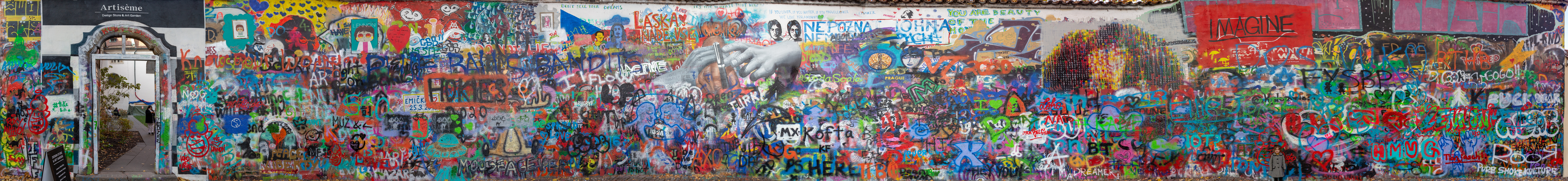
The Lennon Wall, November 2018

== Lennon Walls in Hong Kong ==
During the 2014 democracy protests in Hong Kong, a similar Lennon Wall appeared along the staircase outside of the Hong Kong Central Government Offices. Inspired by the original in Prague, many thousands of people posted colourful post-it notes expressing democratic wishes for Hong Kong. The wall was one of the major arts of the Umbrella Movement. Throughout several months of occupation and protest, many efforts were made by different groups to ensure physical and digital preservation of the Hong Kong Lennon Wall.

Five years later, during the 2019–20 Hong Kong protests, the same wall was created again, with new post-it notes. Within days, dozens of post-it note Lennon Walls had "blossomed everywhere" (遍地開花) throughout Hong Kong, including on Hong Kong Island itself, Kowloon, the New Territories, and on the many outlying islands. There are even some Lennon Walls located inside government offices, including RTHK and the Policy Innovation and Co-ordination Office. According to a crowd-sourced map of Hong Kong, there are over 150 Lennon Walls throughout the region.

On 21 September 2019, police in Hong Kong began tearing down Lennon Walls across the city to remove anti-government statements.

Lennon Walls have also appeared outside of Hong Kong in Toronto, Vancouver, Calgary, Seoul, Tokyo, Berlin, London, Sydney, Manchester, Melbourne, Taipei, and Auckland.

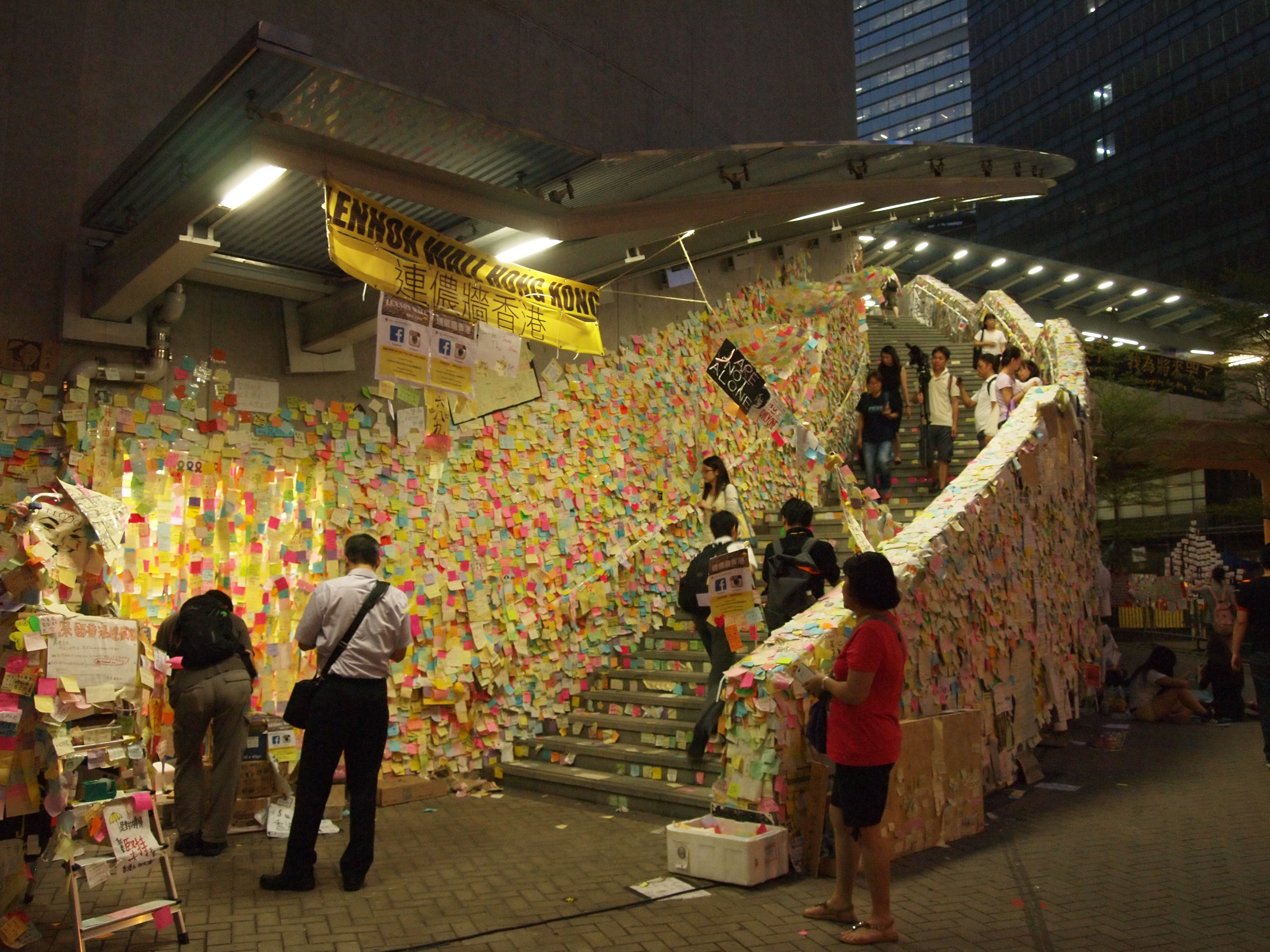
Hong Kong Umbrella Movement protests: The Lennon Wall at Central Government Offices, 21 October 2014.

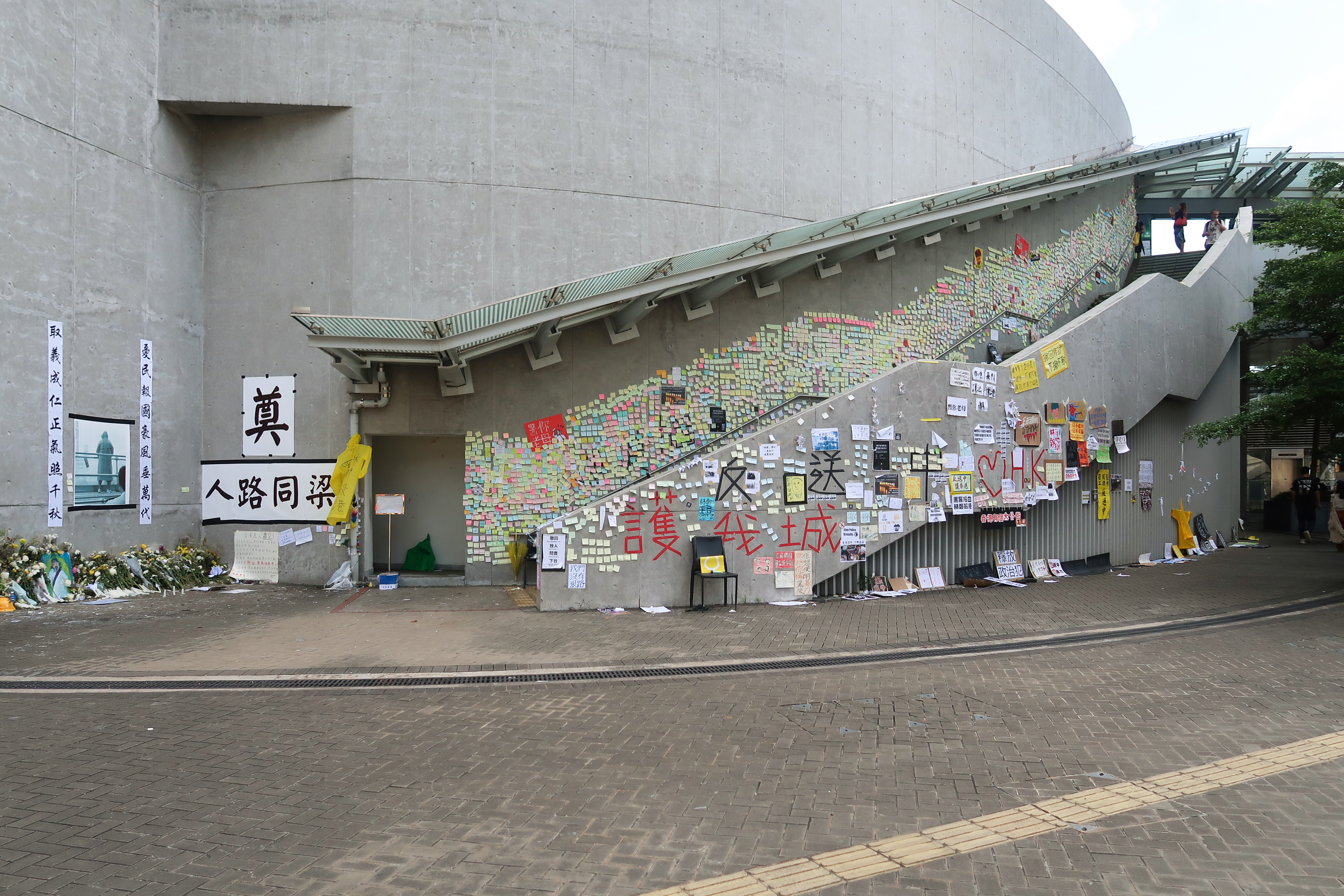
The Lennon Wall returns amidst the anti-extradition bill protests, June 2019.

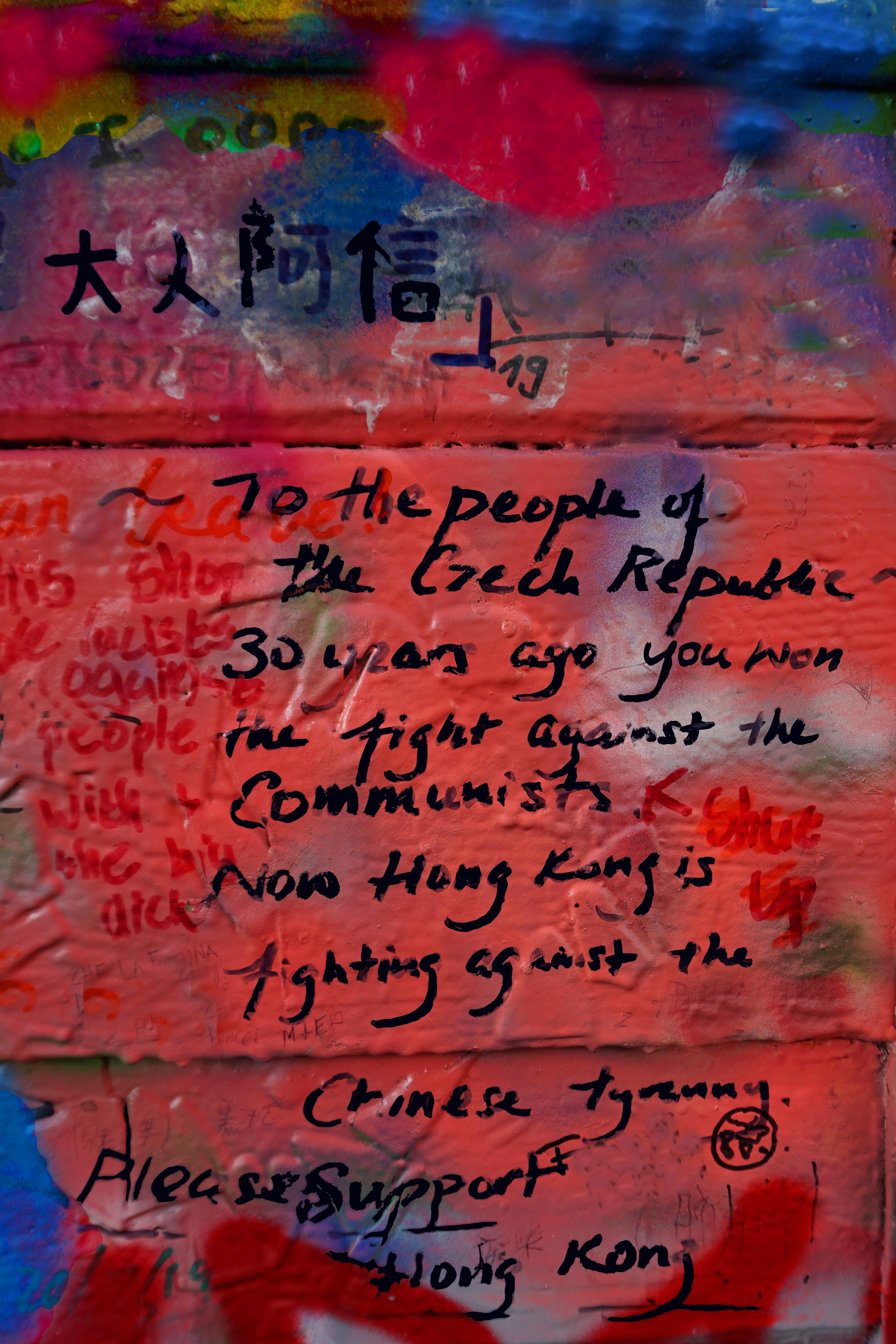
A message from Hong Kong citizens in 2019 on the John Lennon wall in Prague. It reads “~To the people of the Czech Republic 30 years ago you won the fight against the Communists. Now Hongkong is fighting against the Chinese tyranny [sic]. TP Please Support Hong Kong”

== See also ==
- John Lennon Park — Havana, Cuba
- Strawberry Fields — Memorial in Central Park NYC
- Tsoi Wall — a similar wall near Arbat Street in Moscow
- Lennon Walls of Hong Kong
  - Art of the Umbrella Movement
  - 2019–20 Hong Kong protests
- Extinction Rebellion
- List of famous walls
- r/place
