= Monument to José Martí (Madrid) =

Monument in Madrid

José Martí
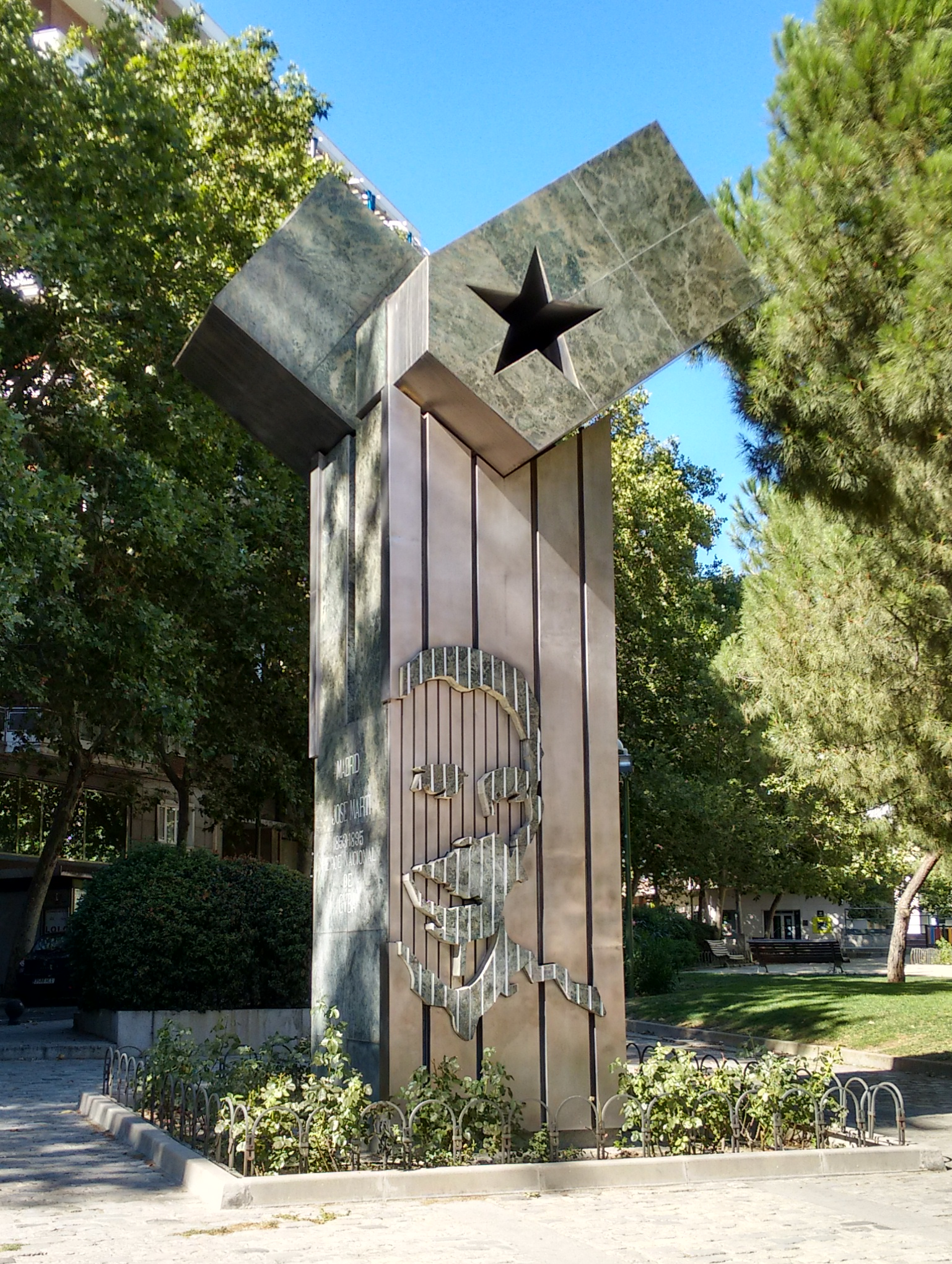
- Location: Paseo de la Habana, Madrid, Spain
- Coordinates: 40.449292°N 3.689156°W
- Designer: José Villa Soberón (sculptor); Rómulo Fernández Villoldo (architect)
- Material: Steel, marble
- Height: 7.90 m
- Weight: 15 tonnes
- Opening date: October 1986
- Dedicated to: José Martí

The Monument to José Martí is a public art piece in Madrid, Spain. A gift from the Republic of Cuba to Madrid, the monument is dedicated to José Martí, a Cuban writer and activist noted for his struggle in favour of the independence from Spain.

== History and description ==
Gifted by the Republic of Cuba to Madrid, the monument was created by José Villa (sculptor) and Rómulo Fernández (architect).

Standing 7.90 metre high, the monument consists of a cuboid with a (1.80 x 1.80) m base, bifurcating in two bodies upon its upper part. Weighing 15 tonnes, it is made of steel and marble. It is ornamented by the star from the flag of Cuba.

The front side displays a relief depicting the bust of José Martí. The right and left flanks feature two inscriptions respectively reading "madrid a josé martí (1853-1895) héroe nacional de cuba" ("Madrid to José Martí (1853–1895) National Hero of Cuba") and "y pongamos alrededor de la estrella en la bandera nueva esta fórmula del amor triunfante con todos y para el bien de todos" (let's put around the star in the new flag this formula of triumphant love with all and for the good of all").

It was unveiled in October 1986 during a ceremony attended by Juan Barranco (Mayor of Madrid) and Armando Hart (Cuban Minister of Culture). It is located at the plaza de Quito, a widening of the Paseo de la Habana consisting of an open space with two fountains, pines, cypresses, and London planes.

== In popular culture ==
The monument is featured in the 1995 film El día de la bestia (The Day of the Beast).
