= John Lennon Park =

Public square in Havana, Cuba

Coordinates: 23°07′55″N 82°24′01″W

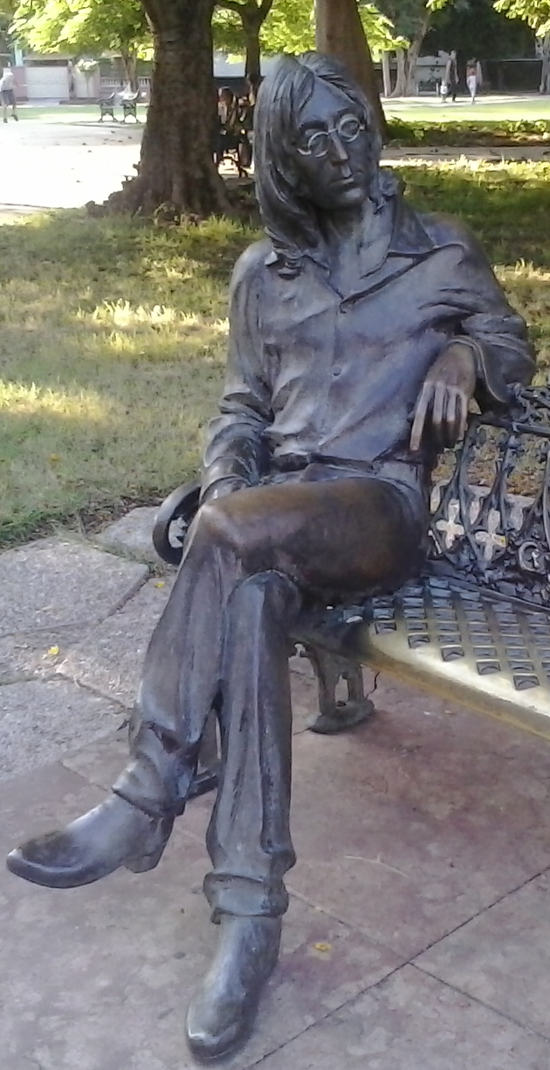
- John Lennon bronze sculpture with his glasses
- Interactive map of John Lennon Park
- Type: Public
- Location: Vedado, Havana, Cuba
- Created: 8 December 2000

John Lennon Park or Parque John Lennon (formerly known as Parque Menocal) is a public park, located in the Vedado district in Havana, Cuba.

== Overview ==
On one of the benches of the park, nearer the corner of streets 17th and 6th, there is a sculpture of the former Beatles member John Lennon, sculpted by Cuban artist José Villa Soberón, seated on the bench's right end. On a marble tile at the foot of the bench there is an inscription reading: "Dirás que soy un soñador pero no soy el único" John Lennon, which is a Spanish translation of the English lyrics, "You may say I'm a dreamer, but I'm not the only one," from the song "Imagine".

The sculpture of Lennon is currently not wearing his signature round-lens glasses, which have been stolen, or vandalized, several times. However, during the day, a security guard can be found sitting next to the bench, and he will place glasses on the statue if there is a request.

The statue was unveiled on 8 December 2000, the 20th anniversary of Lennon's murder. One year later, Cuban author Ernesto Juan Castellanos wrote a book about the statue, John Lennon en La Habana with a little help from my friends, and about the ban that John Lennon and The Beatles suffered in Cuba during the 1960s and 1970s.

== Gallery ==
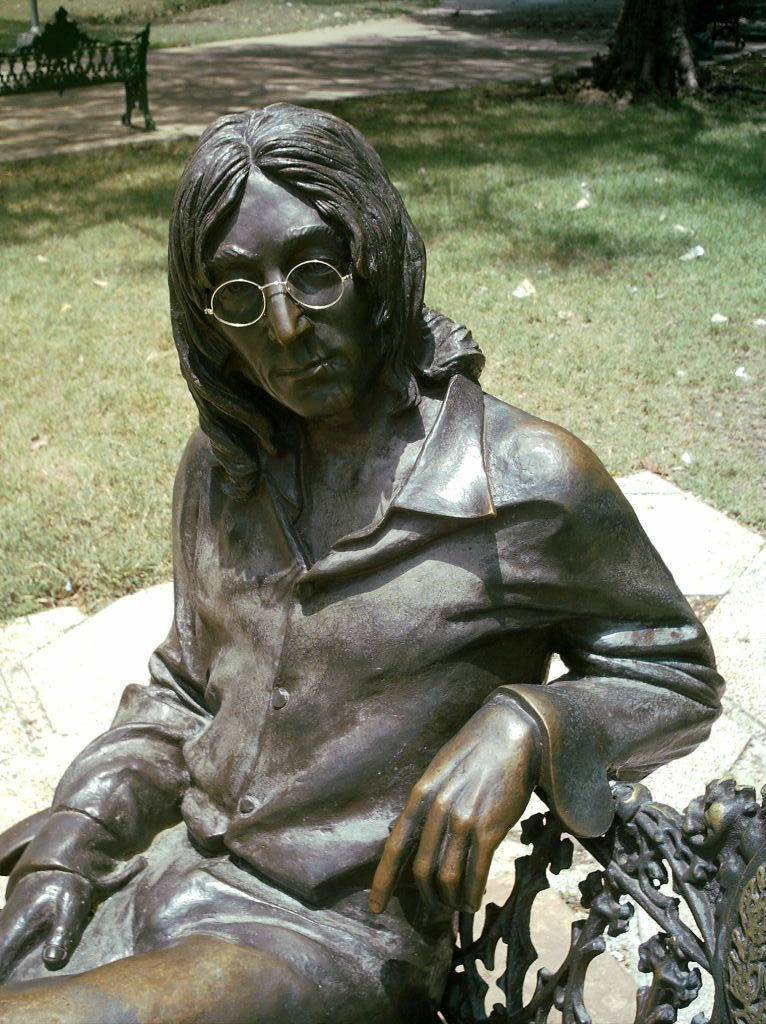
John Lennon bronze sculpture with his current removable glasses.

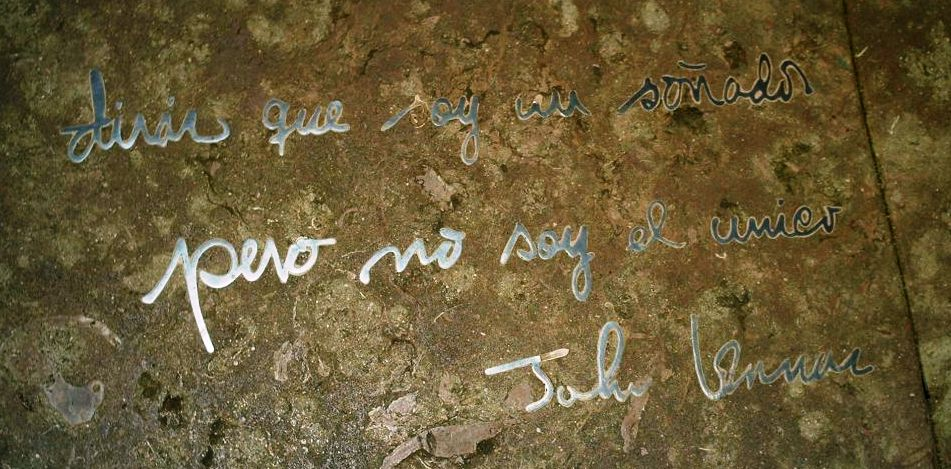
A plaque with the inscription "You may say I'm a dreamer / but I'm not the only one"

== See also ==
- Lennon Wall
