= Lennon Wall (Hong Kong) =

Free speech space

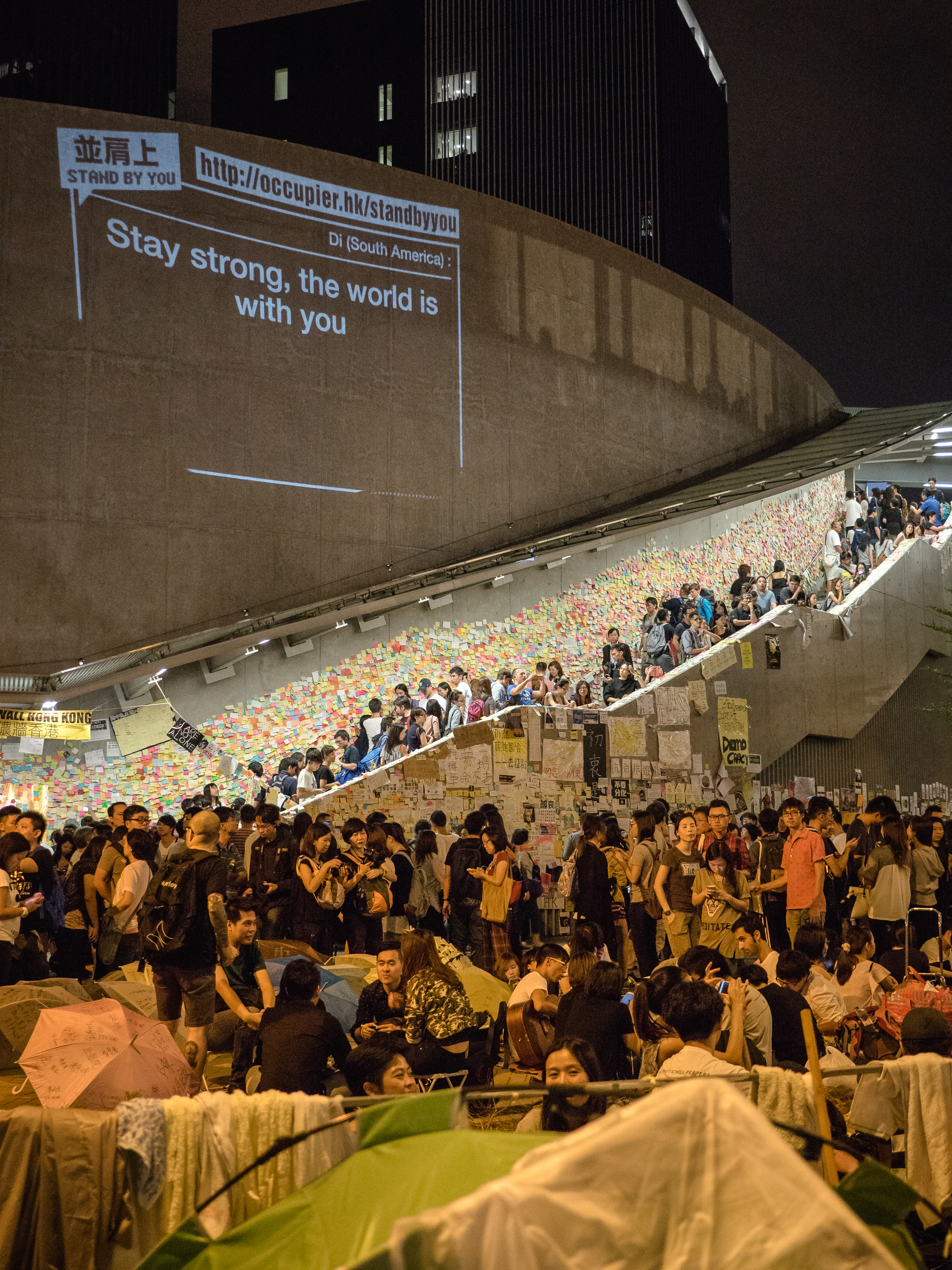
- Lennon Wall – Hong Kong Umbrella Movement protests. 10 October 2014
- Traditional Chinese: 連儂牆
- Simplified Chinese: 连侬墙
Transcriptions
Standard Mandarin
- Hanyu Pinyin: Liánnóng Qiáng
Yue: Cantonese
- Jyutping: lin4 nung4 coeng4

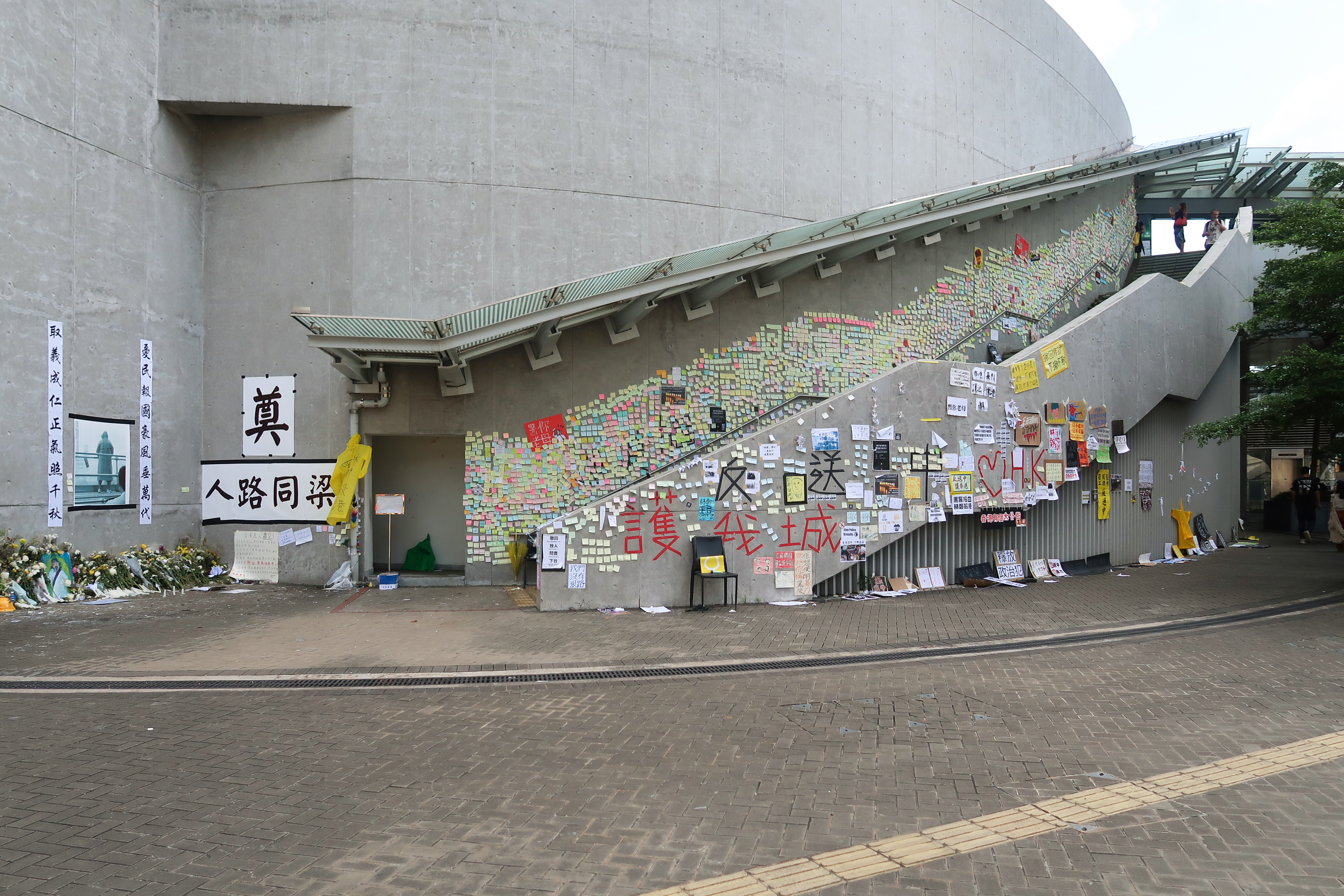
After Anti-Extradition bill protests, the Lennon Wall returns. June 2019

Lennon Wall (Chinese: 連儂牆; Jyutping: lin4 nung4 coeng4), in the Hong Kong context, originally referred to the mosaic wall created during the Umbrella Movement, located at Central Government Complex, Harcourt Road, Admiralty. The wall is one of the major artworks of the Umbrella Movement as a collective artistic work of spontaneous free expression, demanding democracy in the elections of the territory's top leaders. The Hong Kong Lennon Wall is named after the Lennon Wall in Prague.

It was a space of encouragement and solidarity, full of colourful Post-It notes (more than ten thousand pieces) with messages advocating for freedom, democracy and universal suffrage. Post types included epigrams, lyrics, poems, foreign words and hand-drawn graphics. During the 2014 Umbrella Movement protests, there were coordinated preservation efforts to digitally document the wall and related protest art. In 2024, an online Hong Kong Lennon Wall appeared which allows digital Post-It type notes to be added via web browser.

After over two months of occupy actions by democracy activists, most of the artworks were removed from original positions prior to police clearance operations. Many protesters and citizens have tried to re-create some of the artworks, especially the Hong Kong Lennon Wall.

During the 2019–2020 Hong Kong protests, new Lennon Walls appeared in numerous locations across the territory, typically near transport interchanges.

== Lennon Wall in Prague ==
The original Lennon Wall was first created in Prague, Czechoslovakia, following the murder of John Lennon. It was filled with art as well as lyrics from the Beatles. In 1988, a year before the Velvet Revolution, this wall became a way for people to express irritation with the communist regime of Gustáv Husák. Since the 1980s, the wall has been continuously undergoing changes while the original portrait of John Lennon is long lost under layers of new paint.

Nowadays, the wall in Prague is a symbol of global ideals such as love and peace, which served as inspiration for the Hong Kong Lennon Wall of the 2014 Umbrella Movement. During the 2019 extradition bill protests that followed, Hong Kong democracy activist Marco Leung Ling-kit died, becoming a symbol for the movement. Within weeks, artists in Prague had painted a memorial on the wall, with an image of the yellow raincoat he was wearing during the banner drop that eventually led to a fall. Words of encouragement and solidarity were also written, including the famous phrase: "Hong Kong, Add oil."

== History ==
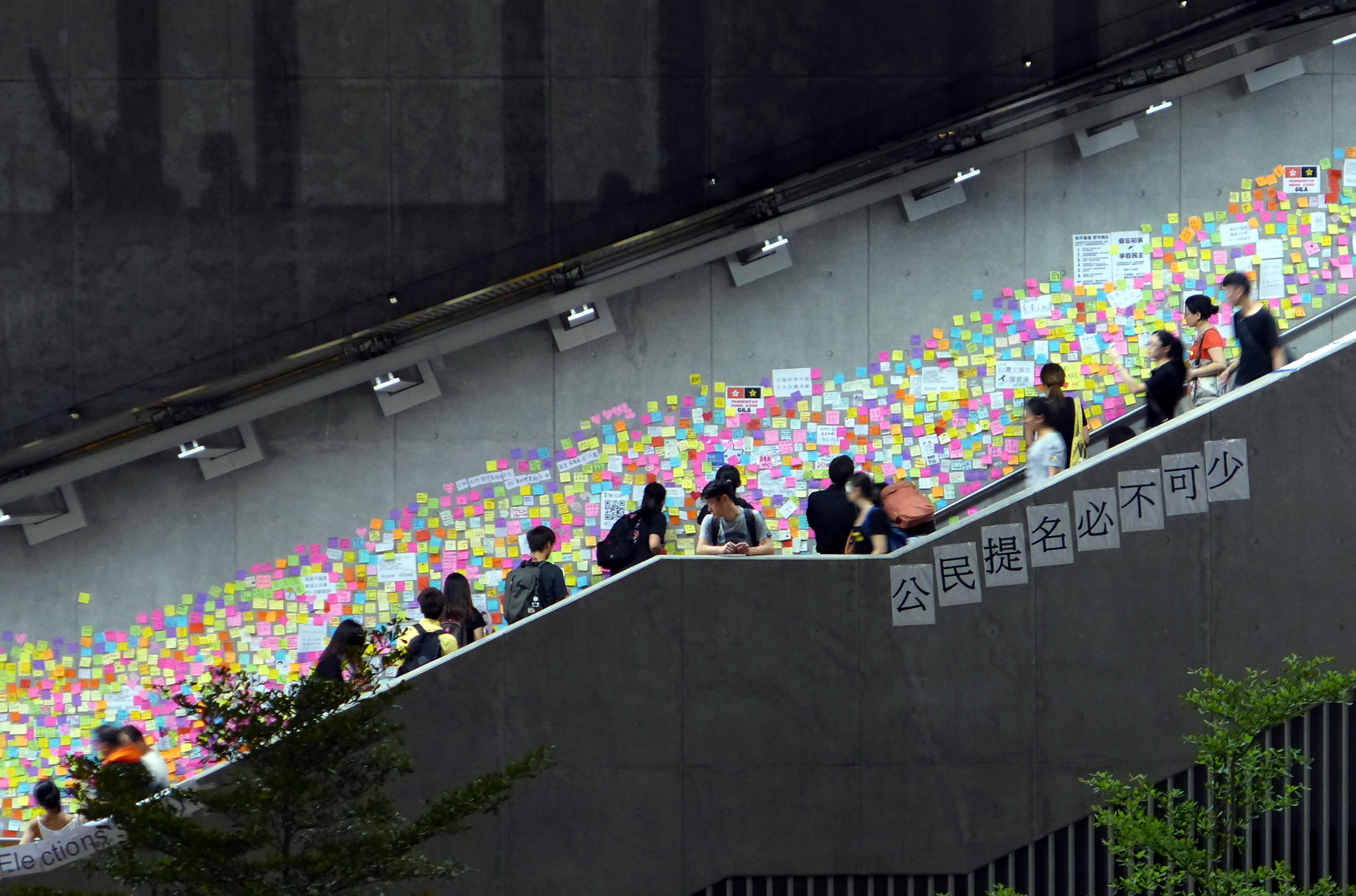
Close view of Hong Kong Lennon Wall on 2014-10-02

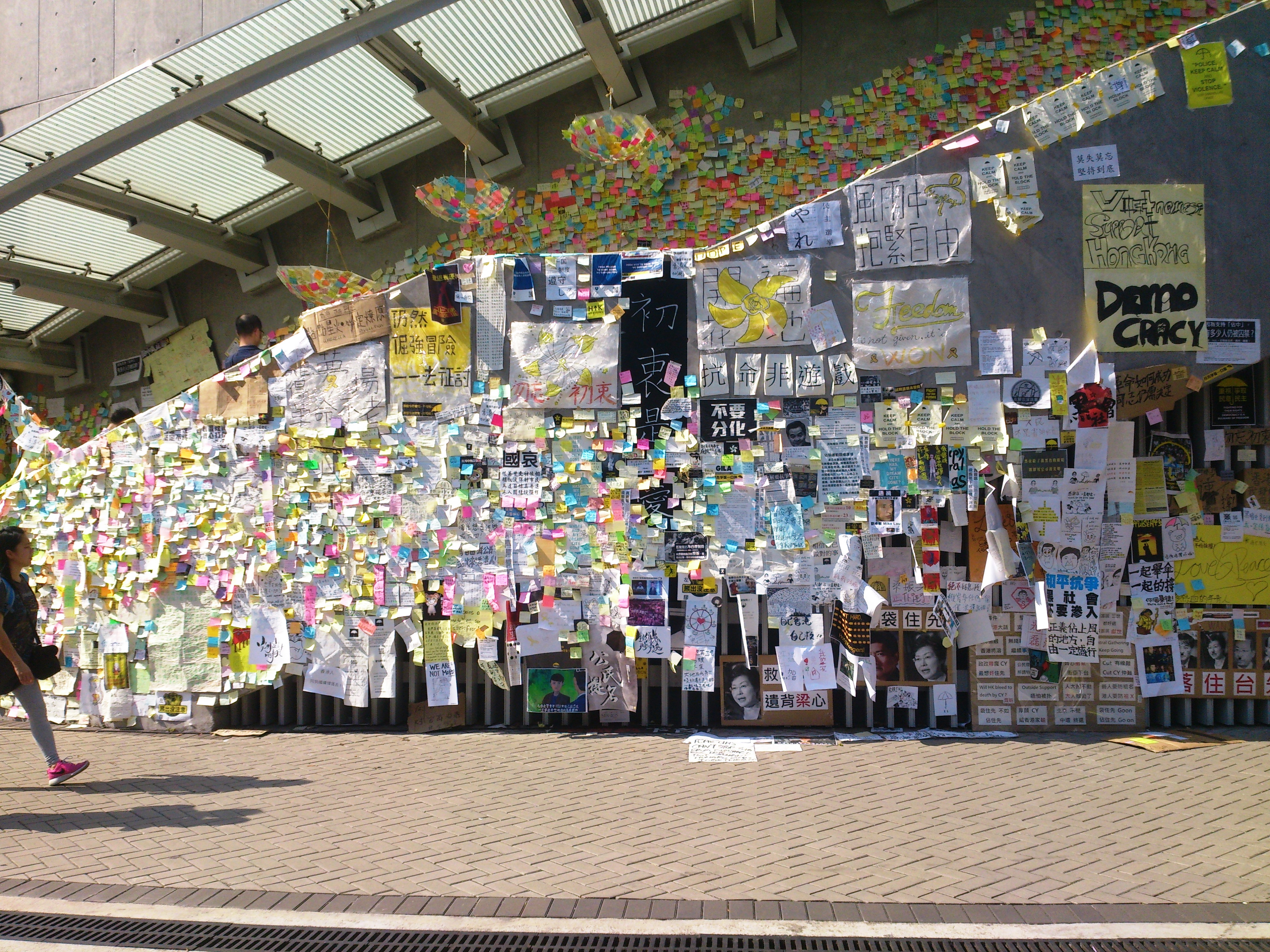
Close view of Hong Kong Lennon Wall on 2014-10-18

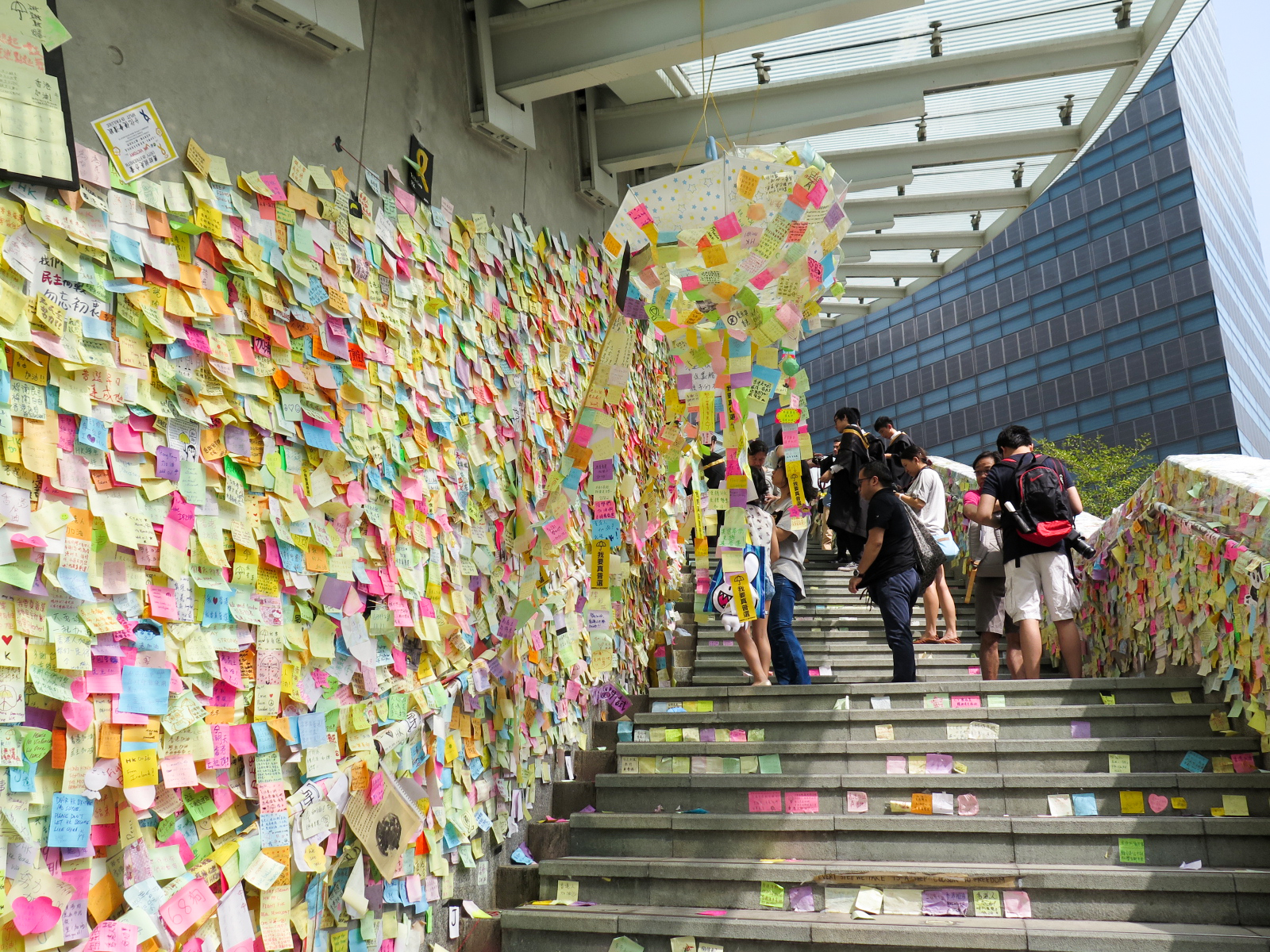
Hong Kong Lennon Wall on 2014-11-01

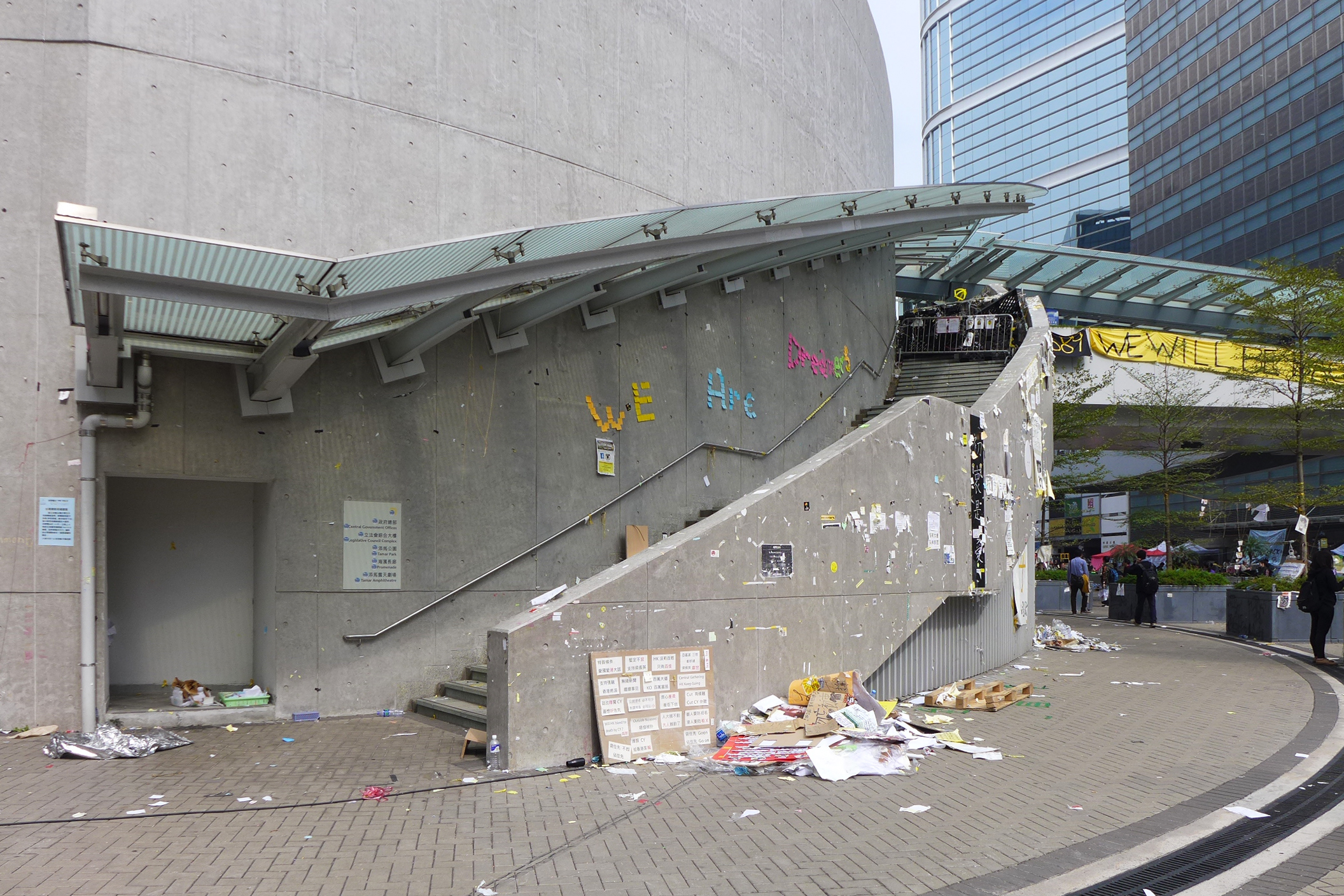
"We are dreamers" – a message written before the police takeover occupied areas. 11 December 2014

=== Umbrella Movement ===
Police arrested a fourteen-year-old girl for drawing flowers on the wall with chalk, threatening her father with removal of custody, and not releasing her back to her family until 20 days later. She quickly became known as "Chalk Girl" (粉筆少女) when pictures of her drawing circulated on social media. Her lawyer, Patricia Ho, stated that the government response to a chalk drawing was "disproportionate" and that "police are using whatever mechanism they can think of to stop teenagers from participating in any protest." A short film about her story, titled "The Infamous Chalk Girl" was released in 2017.

==== 29 September 2014 ====
The day after the occupation started in Mong Kok, the occupation area expanded from Nathan Road and Argyle Street to Mong Kok Road, Sai Yeung Choi Street and so on. Vehicles were trapped because of the full-occupation of all six roadways in Nathan Road while many bus routes had to be rerouted. Meanwhile, those trapped buses and discontinued bus stops became the place where protestors and citizens stuck their opinions of requesting the stepdown of CY Leung and the slogans to call for universal suffrage, which were written mainly on cardboard and papers instead of post tips, which became the prototype for the Lennon Wall in Admiralty.

==== 1 October 2014 ====
The Lennon Wall in Hong Kong was created by a group of post-80s social workers, Lee Shuk-ching and Chow Chi. They bought post-its and invited people to write down their hopes and reasons for stay after around three days after police had tried to disperse protesters by firing tear gas. The first post was "Why Are We Here?" . After that, they stuck their posts, left their pens and post-its, inviting others to write their wishes. The message board started to expand and eventually colonised the entire wall beside the staircase heading to the Hong Kong Central Government Offices. Following over ten thousand notes being stuck onto the wall, this wall became the focus of media. Since the theme and format were found to be similar to the Lennon Wall in Prague of Czech Republic, the banner of "Lennon Wall Hong Kong" was set on the outside wall of the staircase which turned the wall into one of the landmarks for the occupied area in Admiralty. The banner of Lennon Wall Hong Kong also became the Facebook page created by Lee Shuk-ching and Chow Chi for recording the posts on Lennon Wall later on as well.

==== 18 October 2014 ====
An internet version of Lennon Wall was developed as a historical database to record the Umbrella Movement. Due to the clearance action of police, the originator was apprehensive that those post-its would be obliterated. She decided to create an online Lennon Wall and convert approximate ten thousand post-its into electronic form.

==== 13 December 2014 ====
In the study room of Causeway Bay occupation site, some secondary school students who joined the Central occupation used expanded polystyrene to construct a mini Lennon Wall. As the police had already announced that it would proceed with the eviction of the Causeway Bay occupation area on 15 December, citizens went there and left their heartfelt wishes. It became a scenic spot for taking photos.

==== 20 December 2014 ====
In the stair outside Central Government Offices, citizens tried to rebuild the Lennon Wall. They stuck posters printed with "It is just the beginning", "We will be back" and "Umbrella Movement" on the wall. The staff of Leisure and Cultural Services Development attempted to stop them. Although police noticed their action, police did not take action to interfere.

=== 2019 anti-extradition bill protests ===
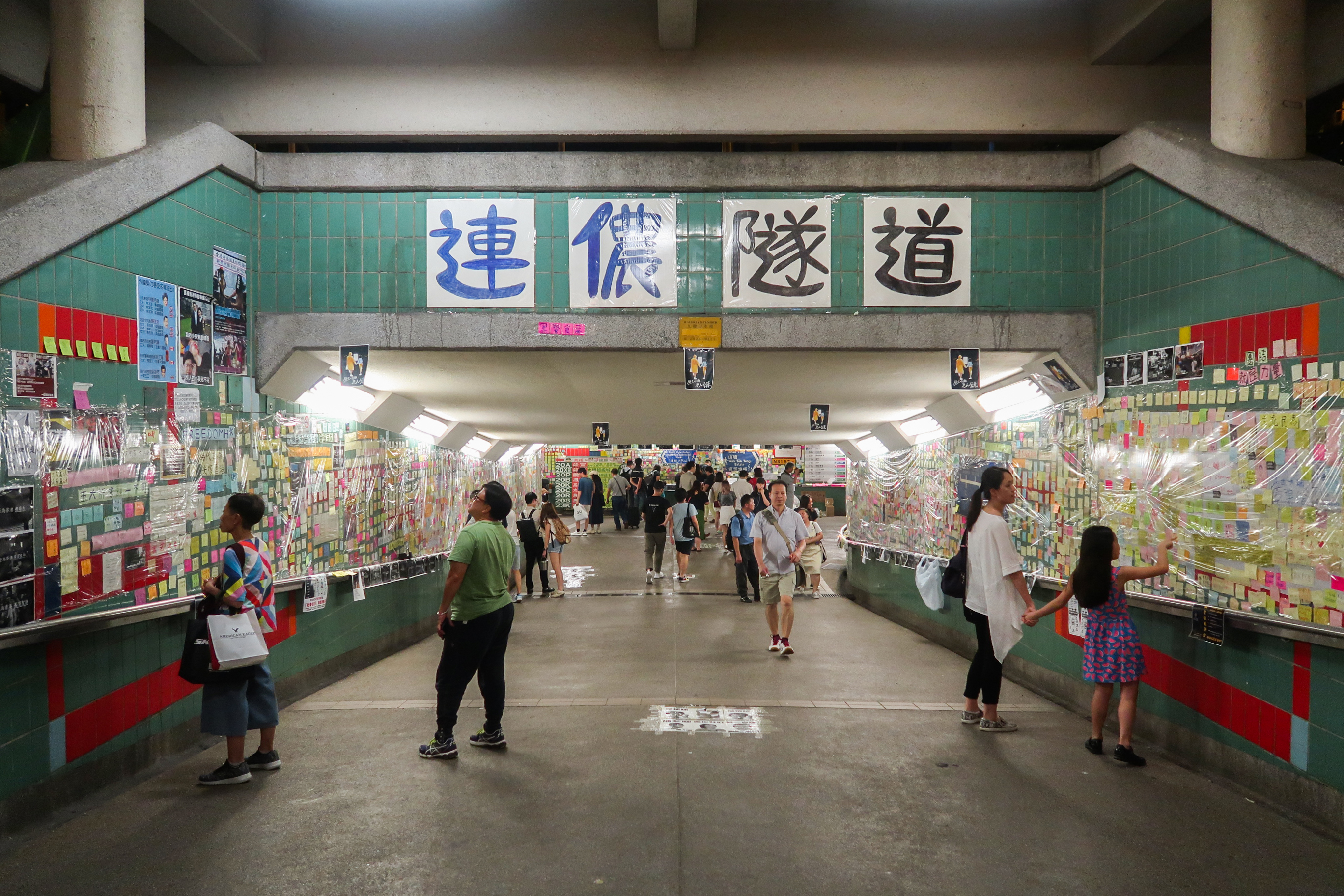
Lennon Tunnel near Tai Po Market station. 7 July 2019

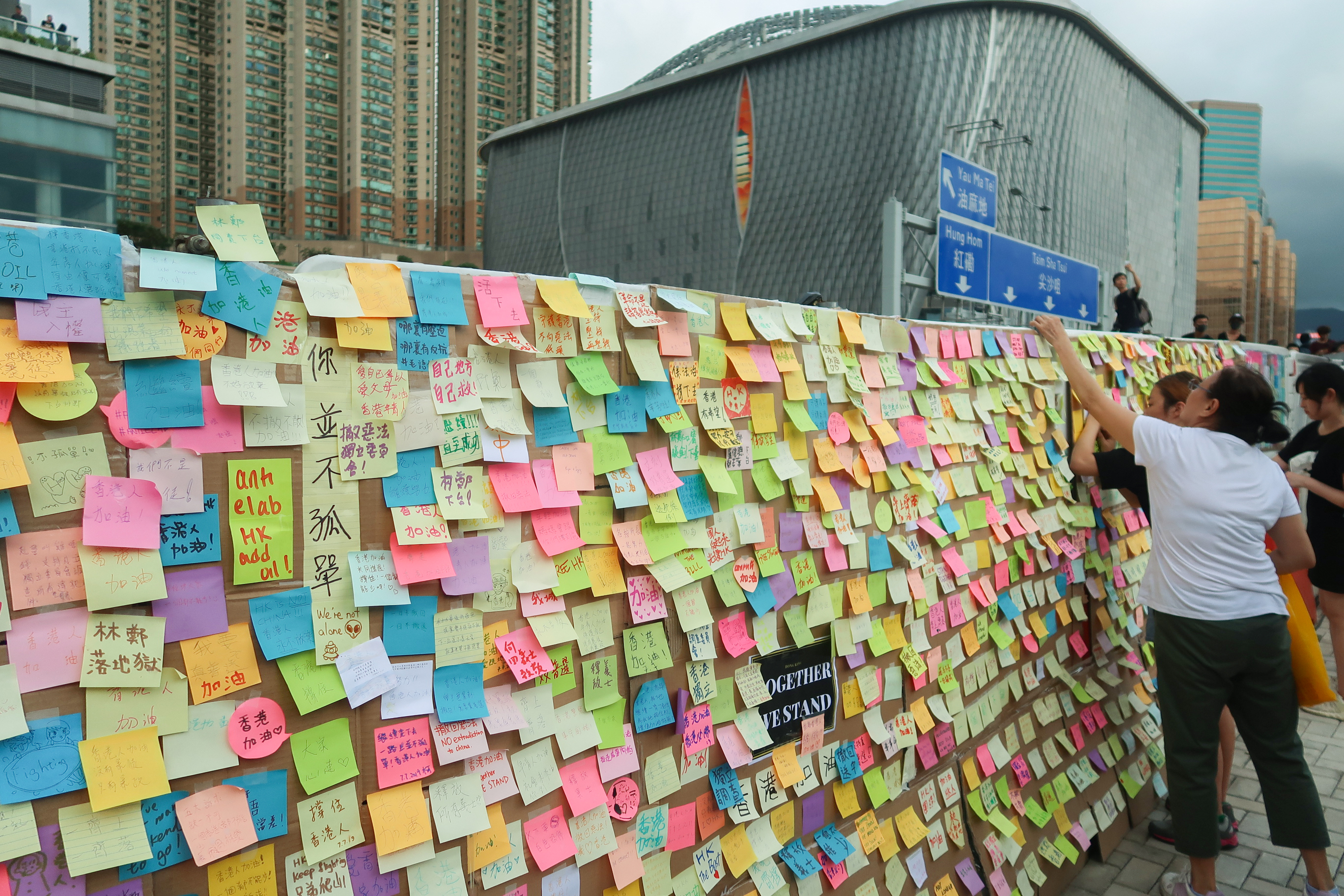
After demonstrations, democracy activists set up a Lennon Wall near Austin station. 9 July 2019

==== Background ====
During the series of protests against the China-Extradition bill beginning on 9 June, the original Lennon Wall has been once again set up in front of the Hong Kong Central Government Offices staircase. During the months of June and July, Lennon Walls with similar encouraging messages written on post-it notes and regular paper have been put up throughout the entire Hong Kong. This is referred to as "blossoming everywhere" (遍地開花).

Known neighbourhood Lennon Walls include Sheung Shui, Tin Shui Wai, Sha Tin, Fanling, Ma On Shan, Tsing Yi, Tung Chung, Tai Po, Sai Ying Pun, Shek Tong Tsui, Causeway Bay, Sai Wan Ho, Chai Wan, Choi Hung, Wong Tai Sin, Kwun Tong, Mei Foo, Kowloon Bay, Whampoa, and Tai Kok Tsui, as well as many others on Hong Kong Island, Kowloon, and outlying islands. There are even some Lennon Walls located inside government offices, including RTHK and the Policy Innovation and Co-ordination Office. According to a crowd-sourced map of Hong Kong, there are over 150 Lennon Walls throughout the region.

Lennon Walls have also appeared outside of Hong Kong in the cities of: Toronto, Vancouver BC, Tokyo, Berlin, London, Melbourne, Manchester, Sydney, and Taipei. Messages of solidarity for the Hong Kong democracy movement have also been added to the very first and oldest Lennon Wall in Prague.

==== Events ====
At midnight on 9 July, more than 200 police officers equipped with shields and helmets stormed into the Tai Po subway that hosted the popular Tai Po Lennon Walls. Police photographed and removed several pieces of paper that allegedly contained the personal information of an officer who, while on duty on 8 July, challenged a peaceful protester to "remember me, and have a fight with me."

Several Lennon Walls around Hong Kong have been reportedly vandalised within the first few days of being set up. To prevent vandalism, the Mong Kok Lennon Wall is situated at a private property with warning messages to ward off vandals.

On 10 July hundreds of people gathered near the Lennon Wall by the Yau Tong MTR station in Kowloon, after word spread that local residents, suspected of being off-duty policemen from the nearby Yau Mei Court, were threatening pro-democracy youth who were tidying up the wall. Police later arrived, and the conflict persisted for several hours; a handful of arrests were made by the end of the night, including the arrests of two retired police officers for assaulting democracy activists. On the next day, a pro-Beijing middle-aged man was arrested for physically assaulting two victims, one of which refused to defend himself or retaliate, when he attempted to tear the sticky notes from a Lennon Wall near Kowloon Bay.

Lennon Wall Flag, a flag proposed as an alternative to the black bauhinia flower flag

== Influence around the world ==
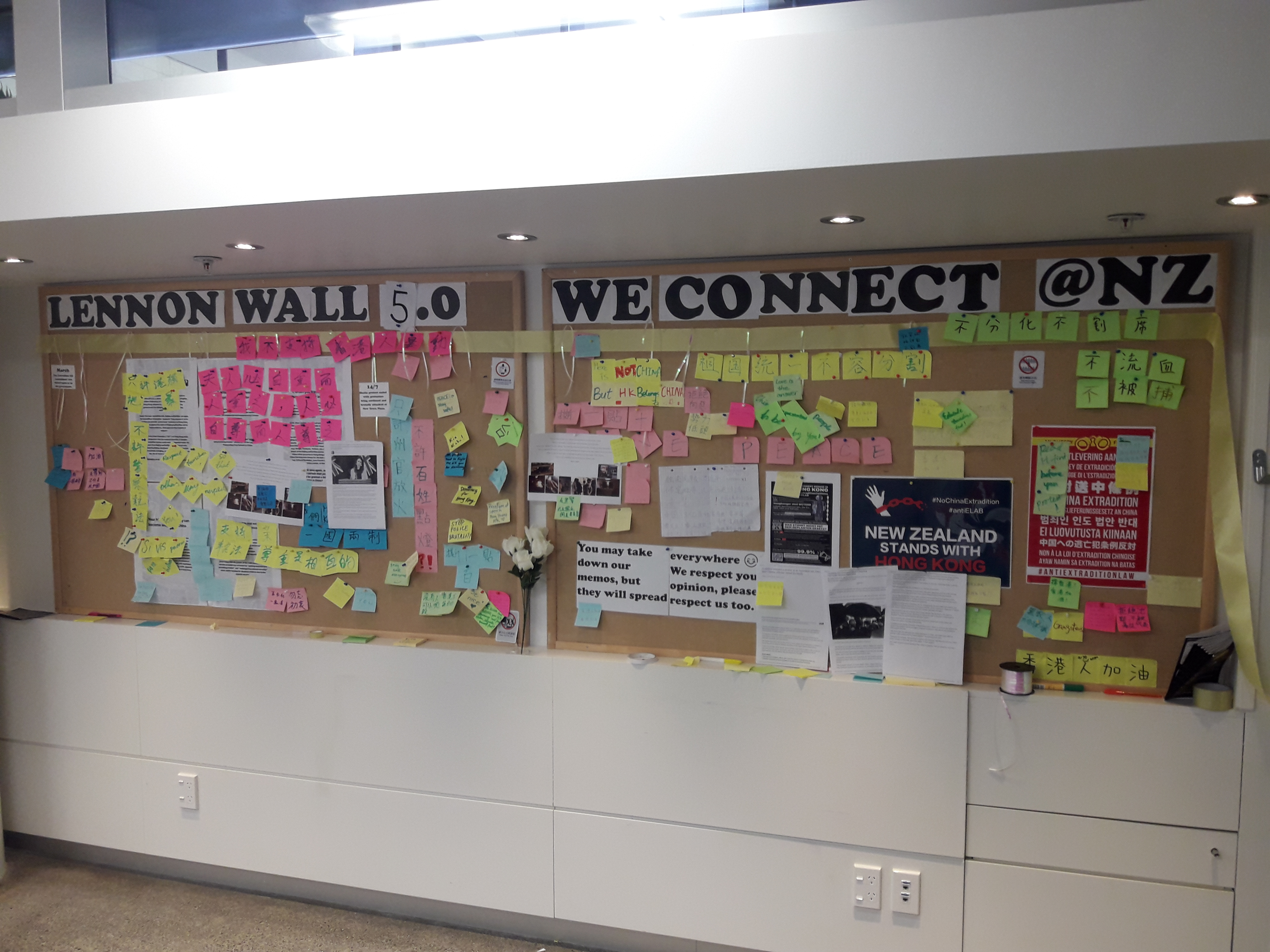
A Lennon Wall in support of the 2019 Hong Kong protest at the University of Auckland, New Zealand

In 2019 and after, Lennon Wall installations sprang up around the world in support of Hong Kong protests against a proposed law to allow easier extradition of criminal suspects to Mainland China.

=== Taiwan ===
- 2–31 August 2019 in Gongguan underground walkway, Taipei
- Kuang San Sogo underground walkway, Taichung
- Yingximen underground walkway, Hsinchu

=== Japan ===
- Shibuya Station

=== United States ===
==== New York City ====
- Grand St/Eldridge St, Manhattan's Chinatown, New York City (NYC's Oldest Cantonese Populated Chinatown to the West including a Fuzhou Populated Chinatown to the East)
- 86th Street/Bay 26th Street, Bensonhurst, Brooklyn, New York City (Home To NYC's/Brooklyn's Newest and Largest Primarily Cantonese Populated Chinatown. AKA: Brooklyn's Little Hong Kong/Guangdong)

==== Seattle, Washington ====
- Gumwall, Pike Place Market, Seattle

==== San Francisco, California ====
- Chinatown, San Francisco, California

=== Canada ===
- Union Station, Toronto, Ontario
- Simon Fraser University, British Columbia, Canada
- The University of British Columbia, Vancouver, Canada

=== Europe ===
- Berlin Wall, Germany
- SOAS University of London, United Kingdom
- University of Durham, United Kingdom
- Monument to Francesc Macià, Catalonia, Spain

=== Australia and New Zealand ===
- University of Queensland, Australia
- Melbourne, Australia
- The University of Auckland, New Zealand

== See also ==
- Online Hong Kong Lennon Wall where messages can be added via web browser.
- Lennon Wall in Prague
- Democracy Wall
- 2014 Hong Kong protests
- Art of the Umbrella Movement
- 2014–2015 Hong Kong electoral reform
- 2019–2020 Hong Kong protests
