= Art of the Umbrella Movement =

Artistic works created as part of the pro-democracy Umbrella movement in Hong Kong

- a commonly seen logo
- Date: 26 September 2014 – ongoing
- Location: Hong Kong; primarily Admiralty, Causeway Bay, Mong Kok; Internet
- Organised by: civil disobedience movement
- Footage: The Works
- Website: facebook.com/umbrellamovementartpreservation?fref=ts

Art of the Umbrella movement refers to artistic works created as part of the Umbrella Movement in Hong Kong which demanded democracy in the election of the territory's top leader. Most of the physical works of art are located within the three main protest sites of Admiralty, Causeway Bay and Mong Kok.

Art is often held to be an integral part of activism. For the students involved in the "Umbrella Revolution", their art is a primary vehicle of expression and a method of documenting what occurs. Use of the umbrella – an everyday item that protects users against the rain and the sun – by the protesters to deflect pepper spray and tear gas of the police, has given the object iconic status at a political level, symbolising resistance and the underlying social grievances. The occupied streets of Hong Kong have been transformed into an extended canvas of artistic creativity.

== Iconography ==
As an everyday item that protects users against the rain and the sun, the umbrella has, in the past, symbolised political weakness. In the context of the Hong Kong protests, it has been used to shield against the pepper spray and tear gas of the police, thus has become a political symbol of resistance. Physical umbrellas in all their guises have been used as subjects or as objects. The eight-lane expanse of road freed by the occupation has been transformed into an extended canvas for artistic expression. One artist explained that due to the lack of physical public space in Hong Kong, people's imagination is suppressed. She added that: "When the rules that bind your action are suddenly lifted, you are given the freedom to redefine everything." Artwork featuring the form of umbrellas are in abundance. Examples of works include umbrellas drawn on or decorated with calligraphy, balloon twisting into umbrellas, and mobiles of origami umbrellas. Colette Gaiter, an Associate Professor of Art at the University of Delaware, praised the quality of the artwork as possessing "an elevated aesthetic sensibility even in the ubiquitous handwritten signs and Post-it notes".

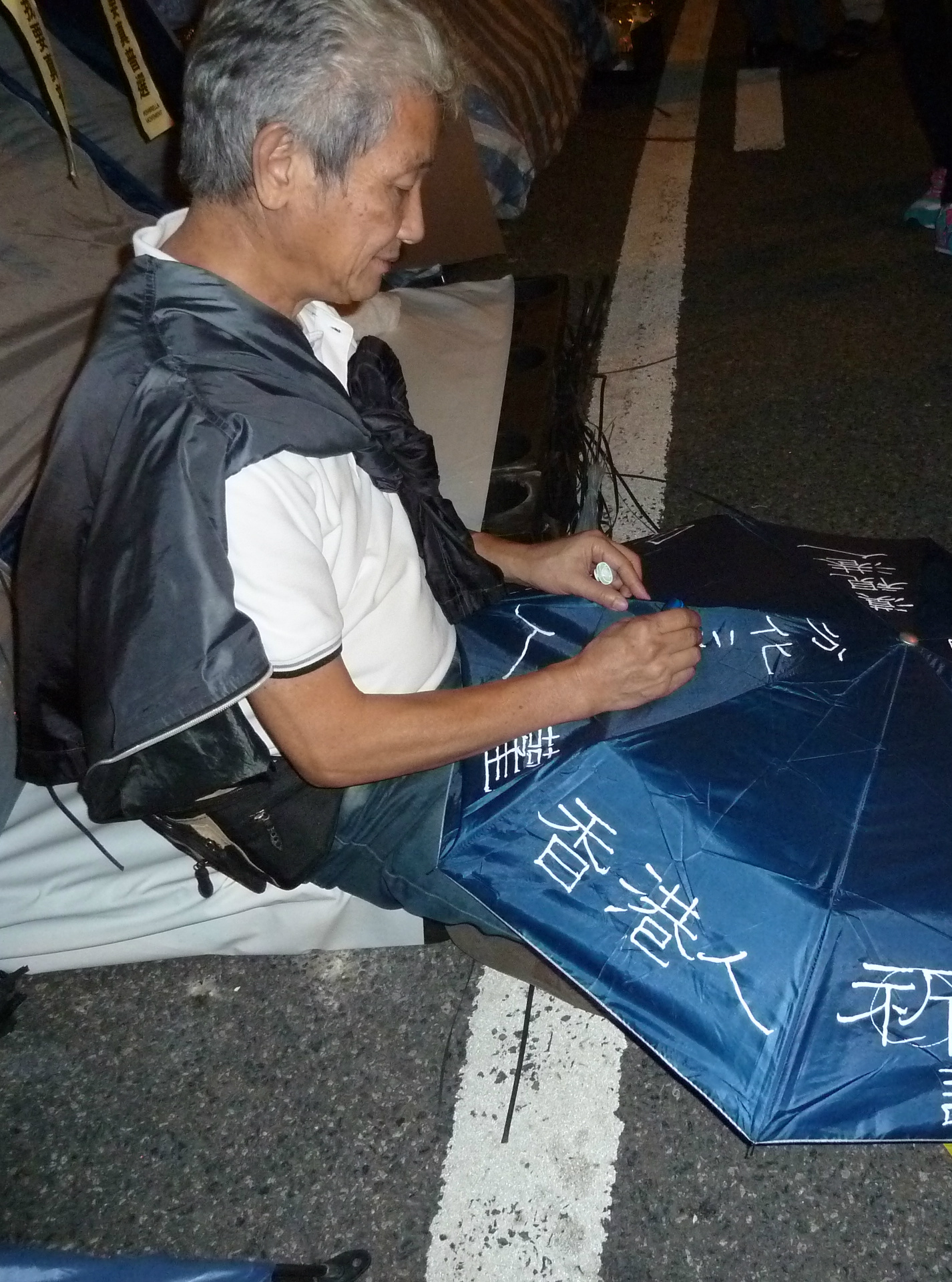
Calligraphy on umbrellas

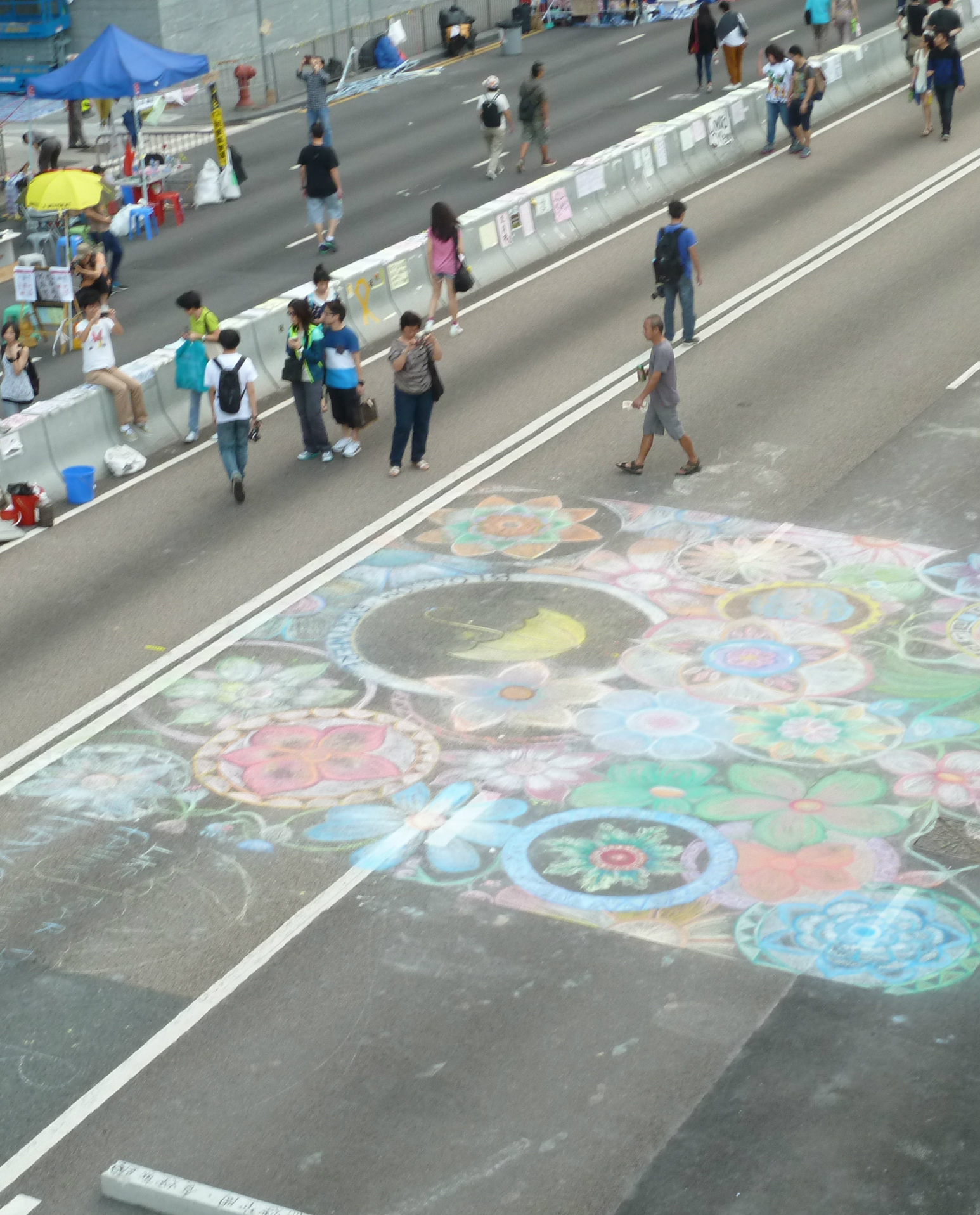
Chalk drawing on Harcourt Road (Umb Sq)

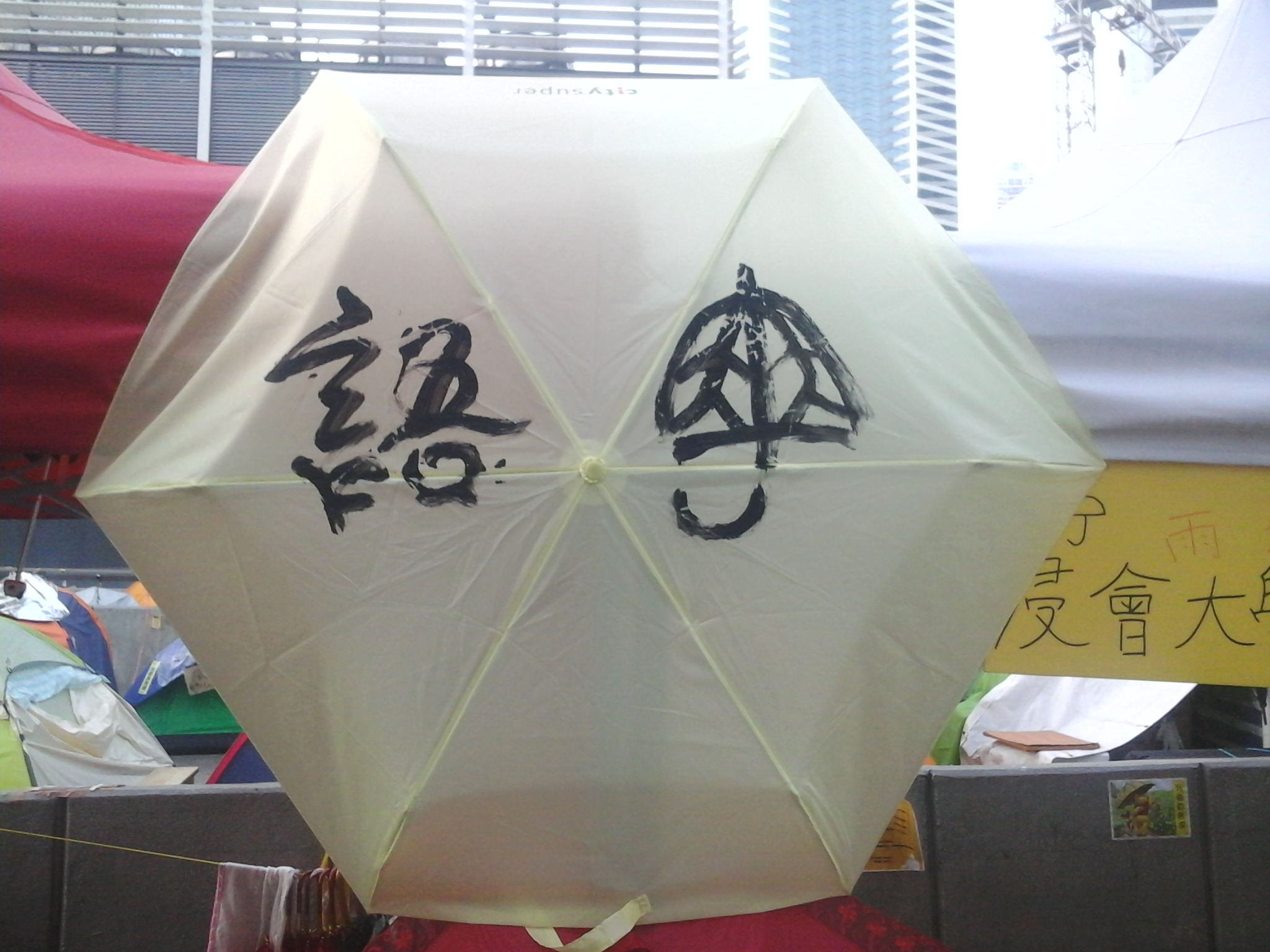
Umbrella language

Kacey Wong, Assistant professor of Design at the Hong Kong Polytechnic University held a contest for the best logo, and received entries from all over the world. The competition aims to elevate awareness and generate more concern for the demand for "real universal suffrage" for Hong Kong. Wong said that use of social media such as Facebook allows for the creation of a "safe platform" for universal participation, which in turn generates awareness. Among the entries is one created by international street artist Invader.

The yellow ribbon, which has been used to represent women's suffrage, was adopted early by the movement. Activists adorned street railings and barricades with these, pinned them on shirts, and used them on Facebook profiles. Use of the symbolic yellow crossed over into the umbrellas.

Opening up yellow umbrellas indoors, as well as outdoors, has also become a way of sending in pro-democracy message in silence. Paul Zimmerman, a district councilor and member of the Civic Party, was an early proponent. Two days into the movement, Zimmerman opened a yellow umbrella at an indoor reception after a National Day ceremony which was attended by representatives of the PRC government. The graduation ceremonies of most universities in Hong Kong since October 2014 have seen attendees opening yellow umbrellas inside the hall, or graduates climbing the stage holding open umbrellas. Dozens of supporters arrived at Hong Kong International Airport with yellow umbrellas to send off the HKFS delegation that was set to fly to Beijing on 15 November.

== Installations ==
A number of installations and sculptures were created at occupation sites, of which one of the largest is a patchwork hanging in the middle of Umbrella Square made of fabric taken from more than a hundred broken umbrellas which were sewn together. The concept was developed by Baptist University art students, to bolster the movement in the early days. A group of about ten other students stripped the fabric from umbrellas that were broken and had been stained by tear gas in the police bombardment of 28 September, and wove them together and deployed it above what is now referred to as "Umbrella Square". Tse, the project leader, hoped that the umbrellas broken by the police, fashioned into canopy, symbolises an extended physical protection for citizens that also serves as a reminder of the presence of other citizens who are behind to support, in other ways. At Admiralty, large yellow umbrellas have been installed at many lamp posts; Happy Gadfly concept by mainland artist Miso Zo inspired by The Gadfly, by Ethel Lilian Voynich. Made from discarded umbrellas, plastic bottles and other discarded materials, the project's originator says the installation symbolises how "They can destroy the movement, but like the fly it will come back." Other sizeable installations include a pepper spray installation at Causeway Bay, a shrine to Kwan Yu at Mong Kok.

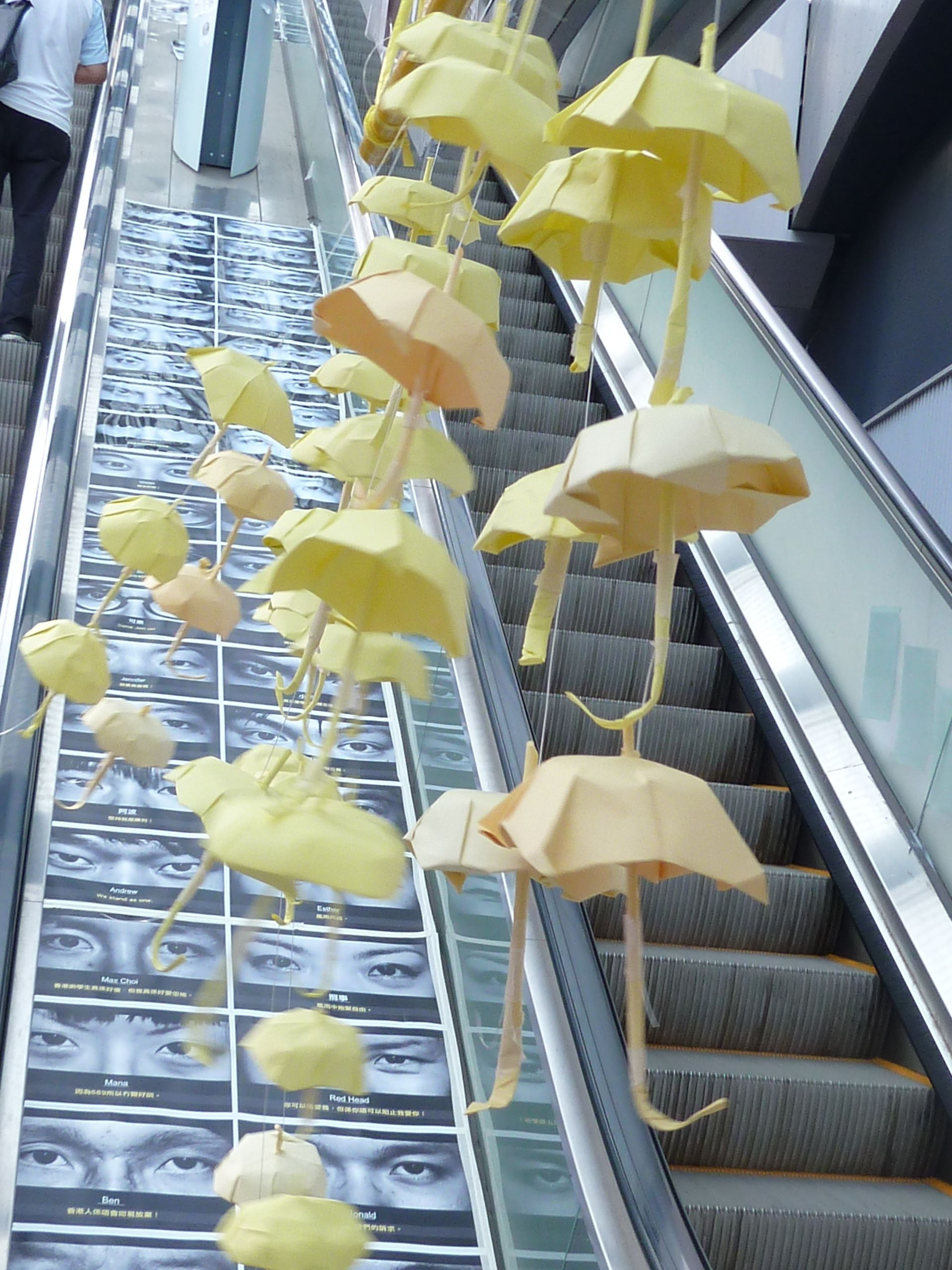
Origami mobile and escalator eyes (Umbrella Square)

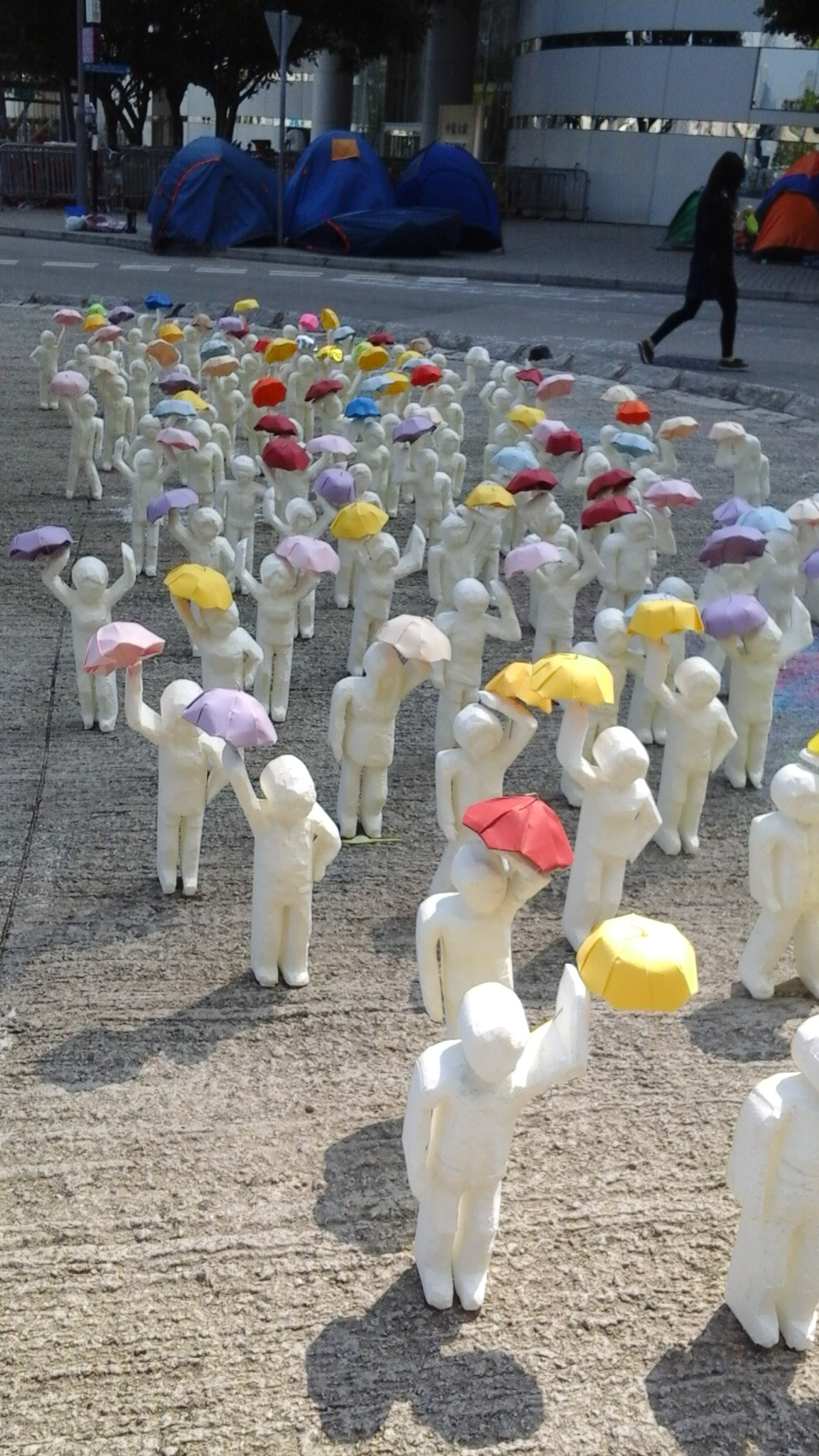
Umbrella army (Umbrella Square)

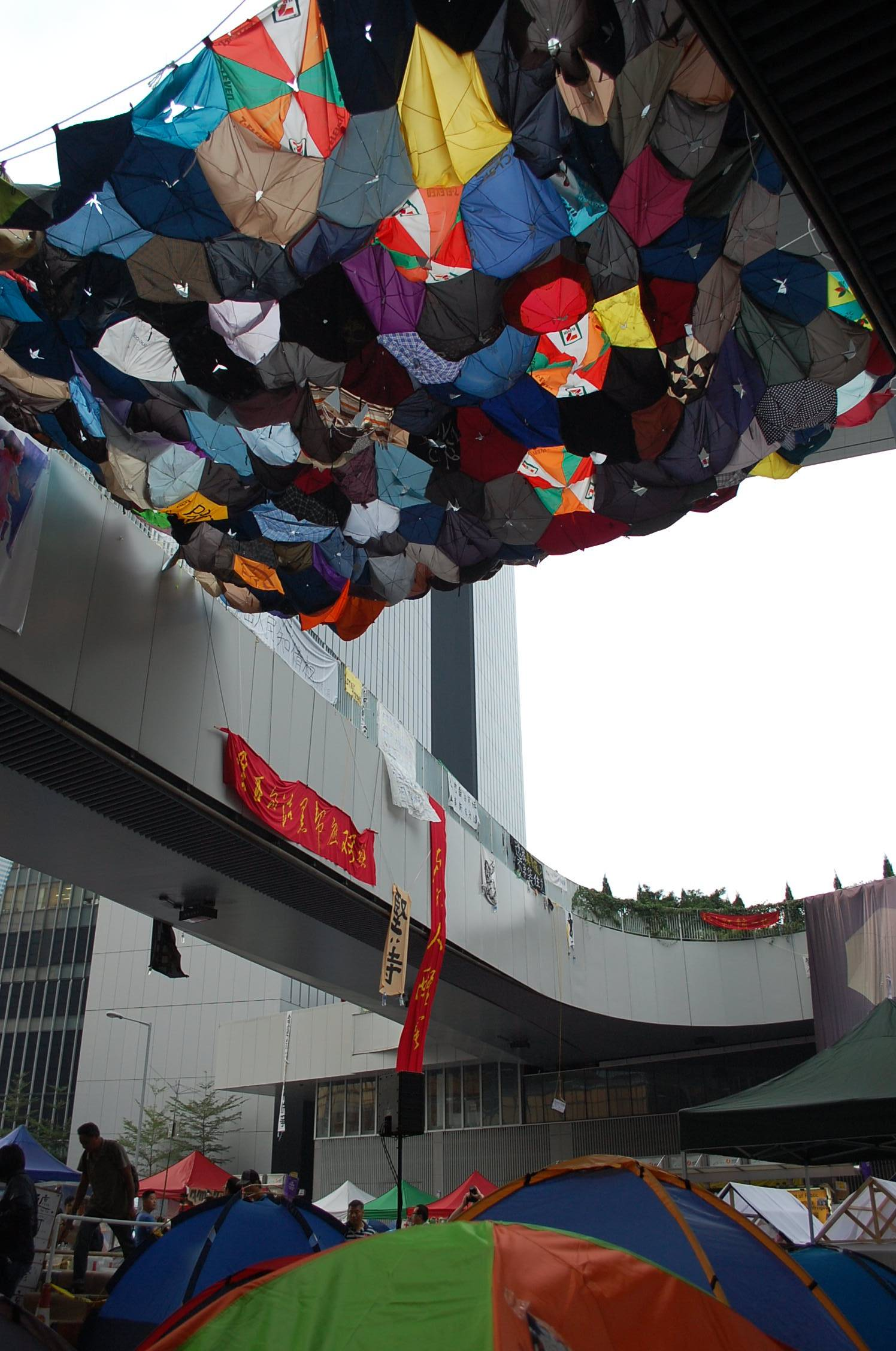
Patchwork canopy from umbrella fabric (Umbrella Square)

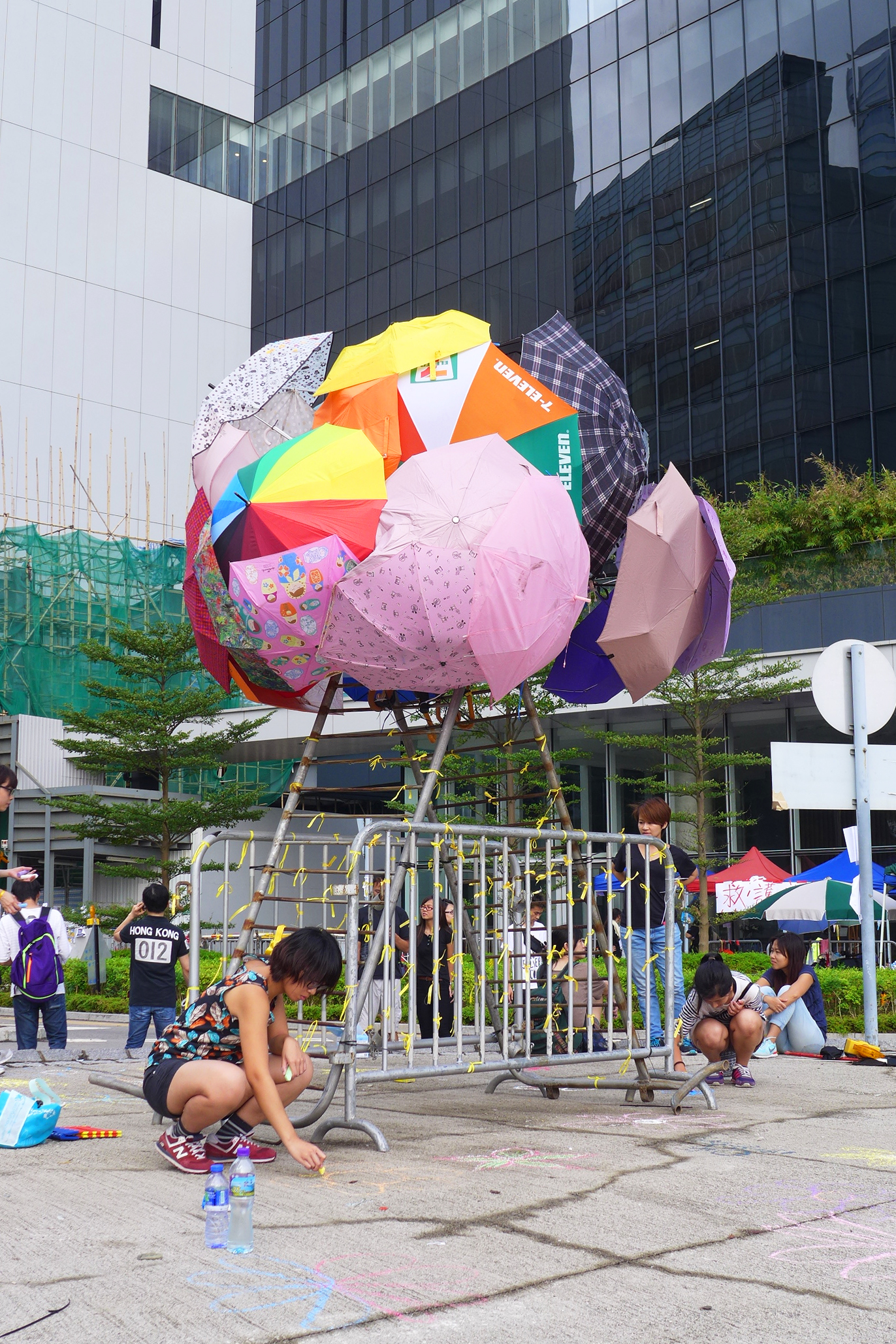
Installation on the Tim Mei Avenue roundabout (Umbrella Square)

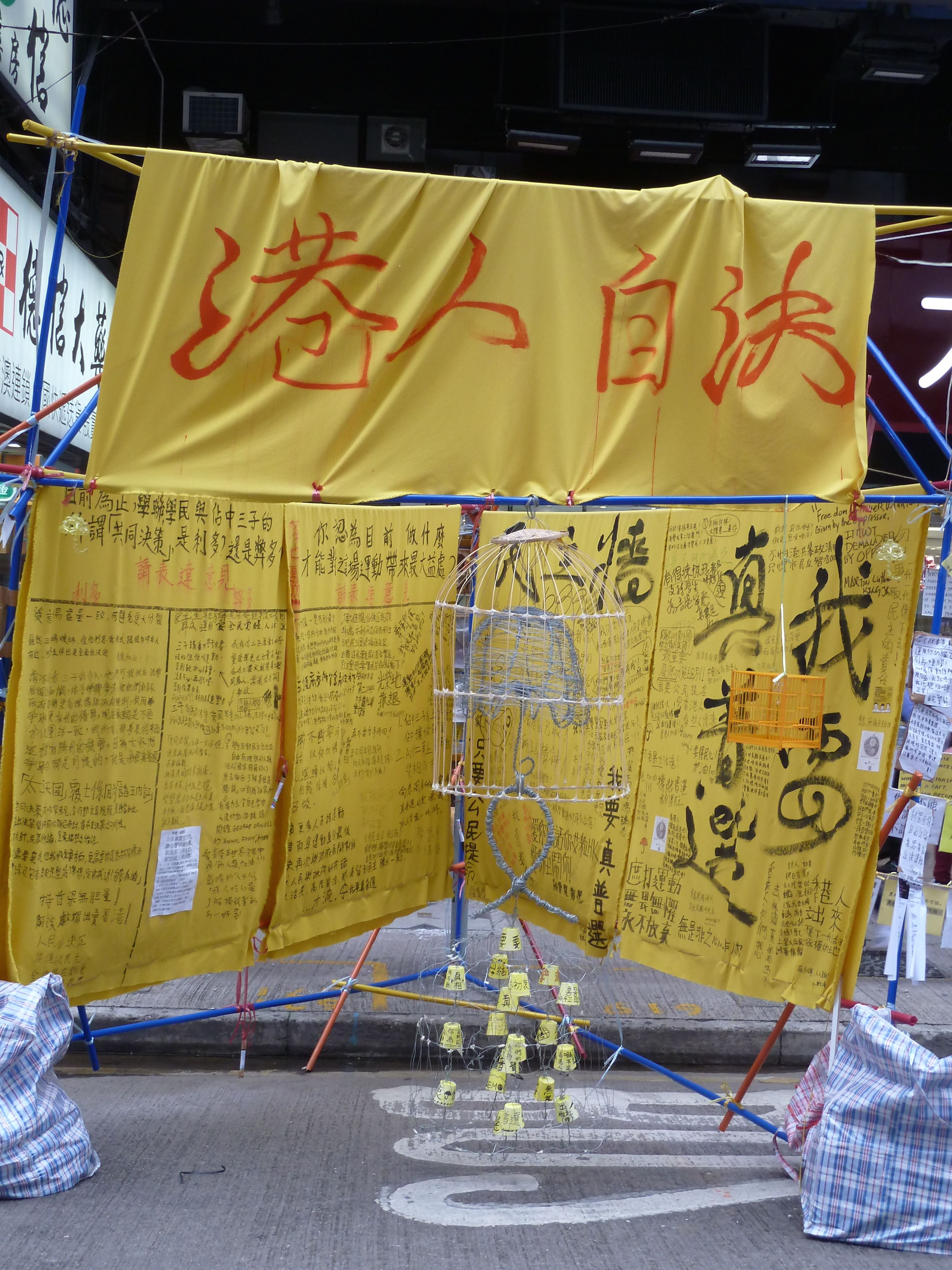
Birdcage (Causeway Bay)
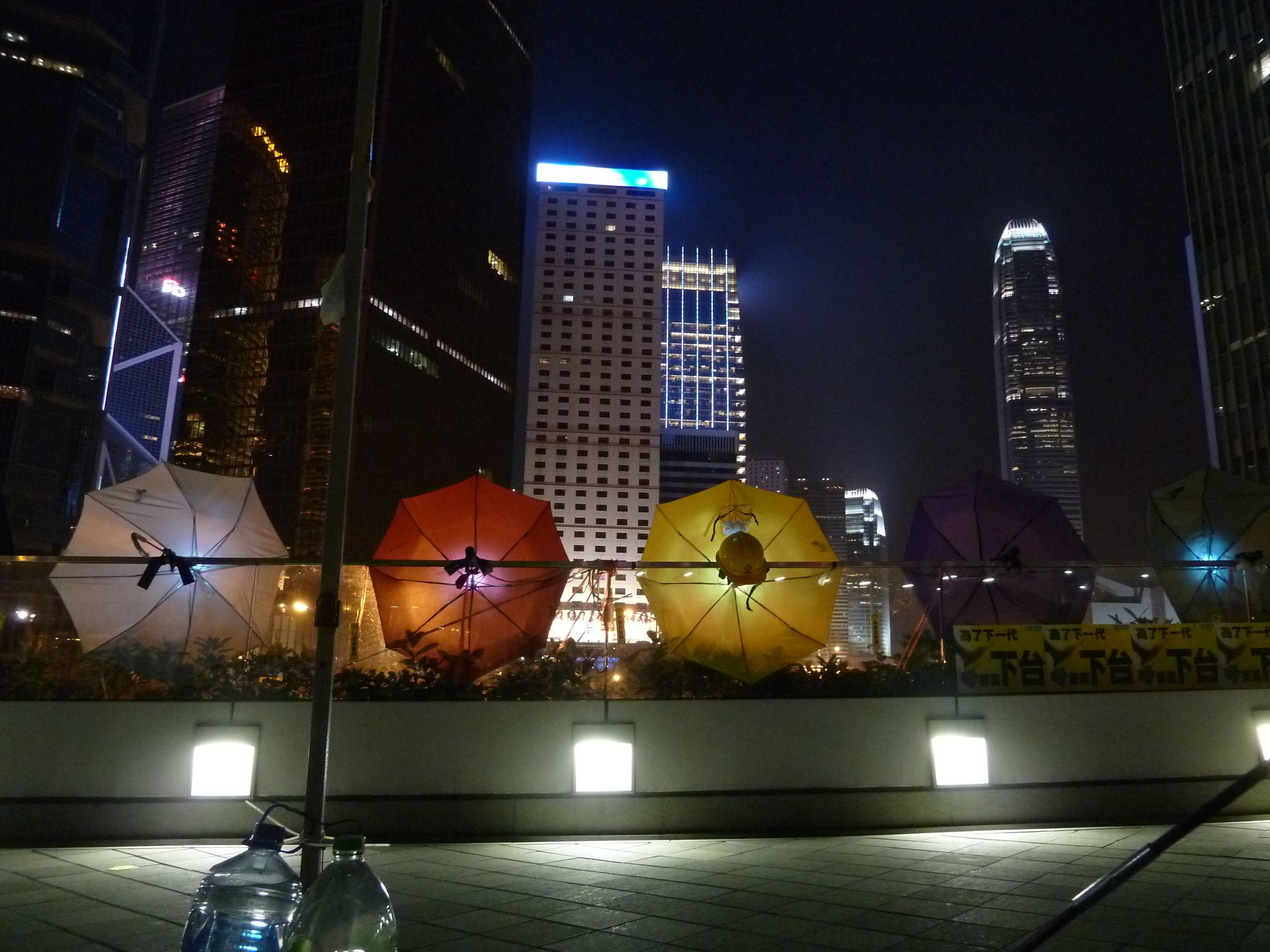
Five umbrellas (Umbrella Square)

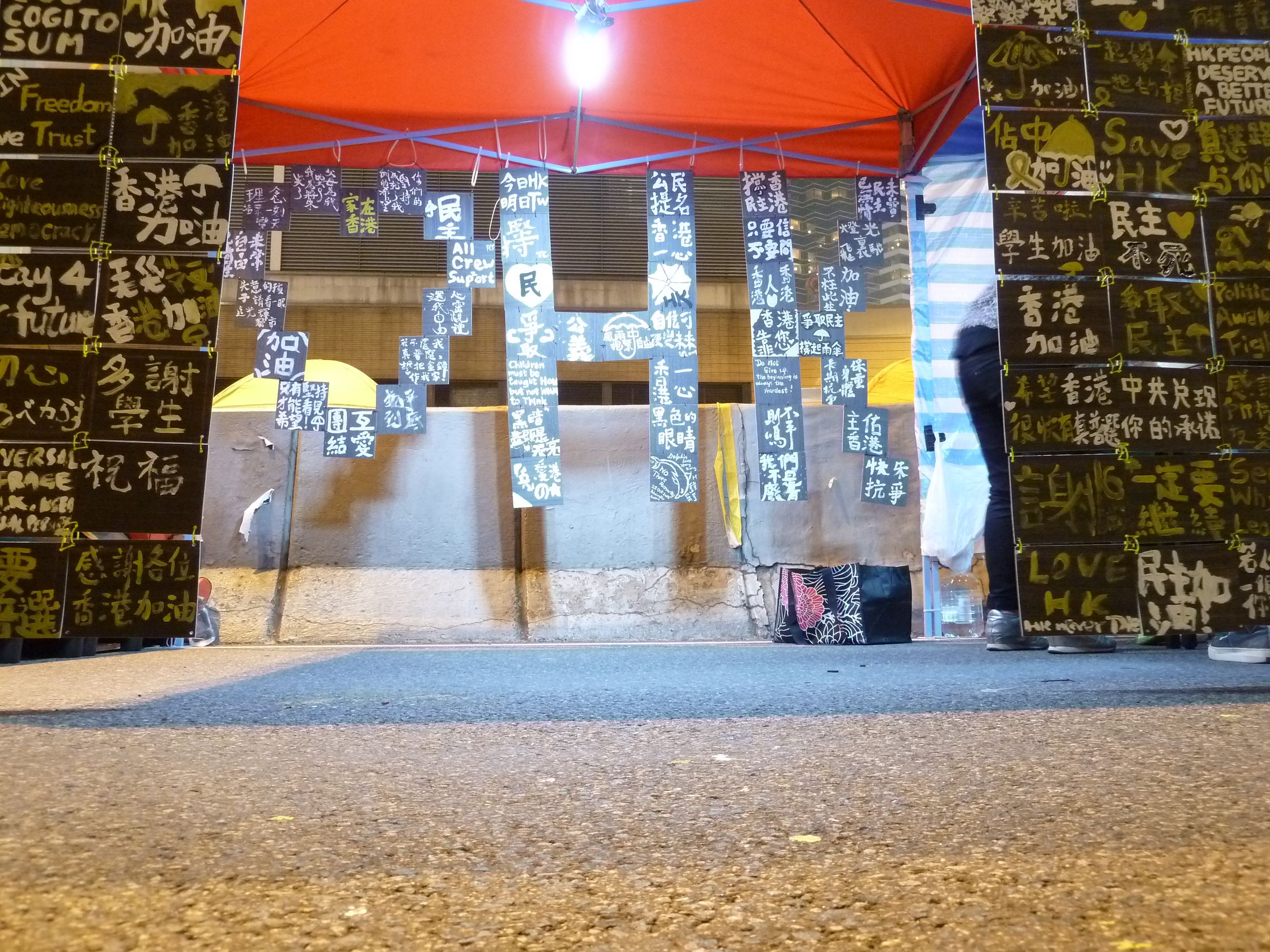
I ♥ HK (Umbrella Square)
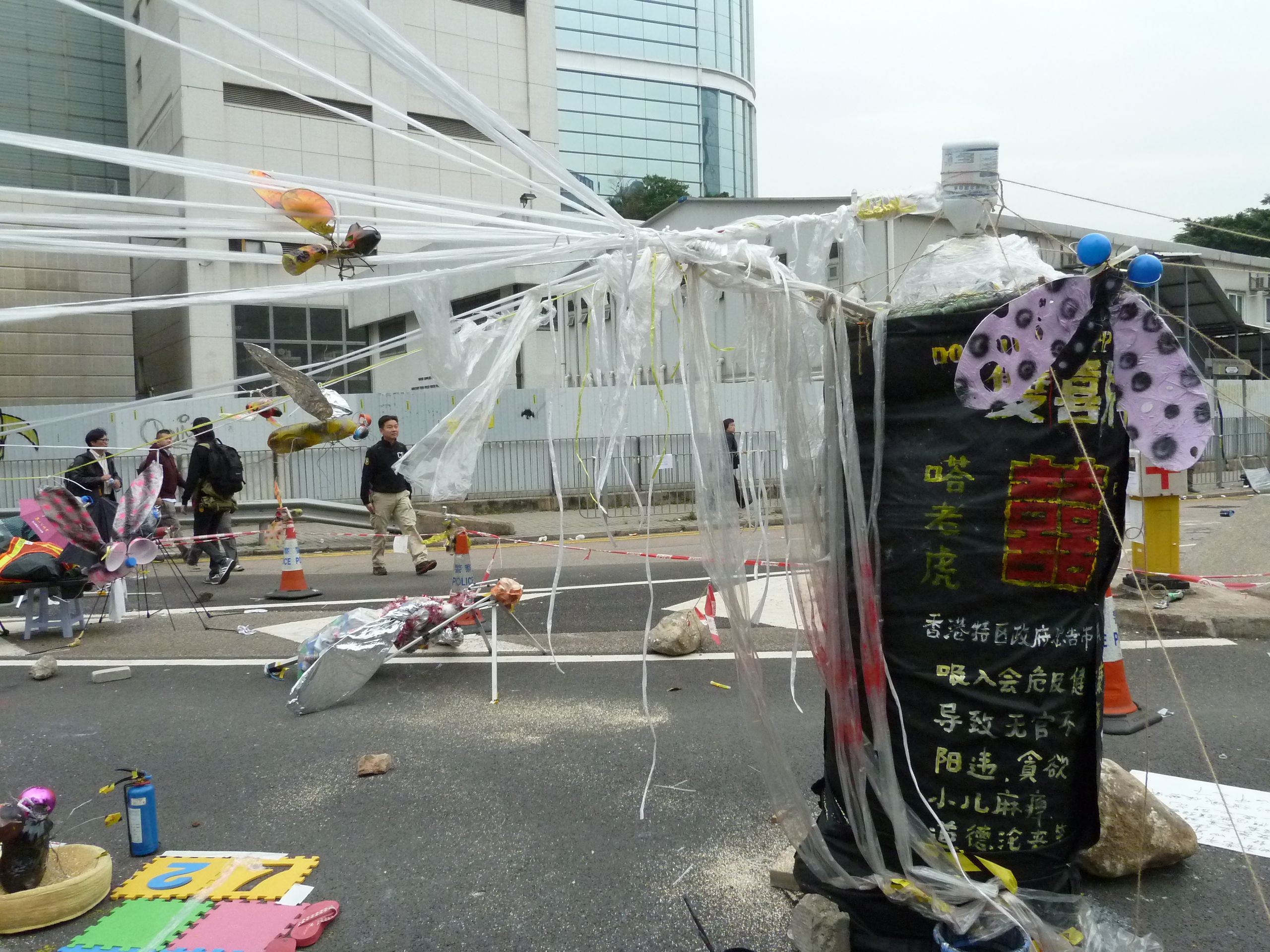
Part of The Happy Gadfly (Umbrella Square)

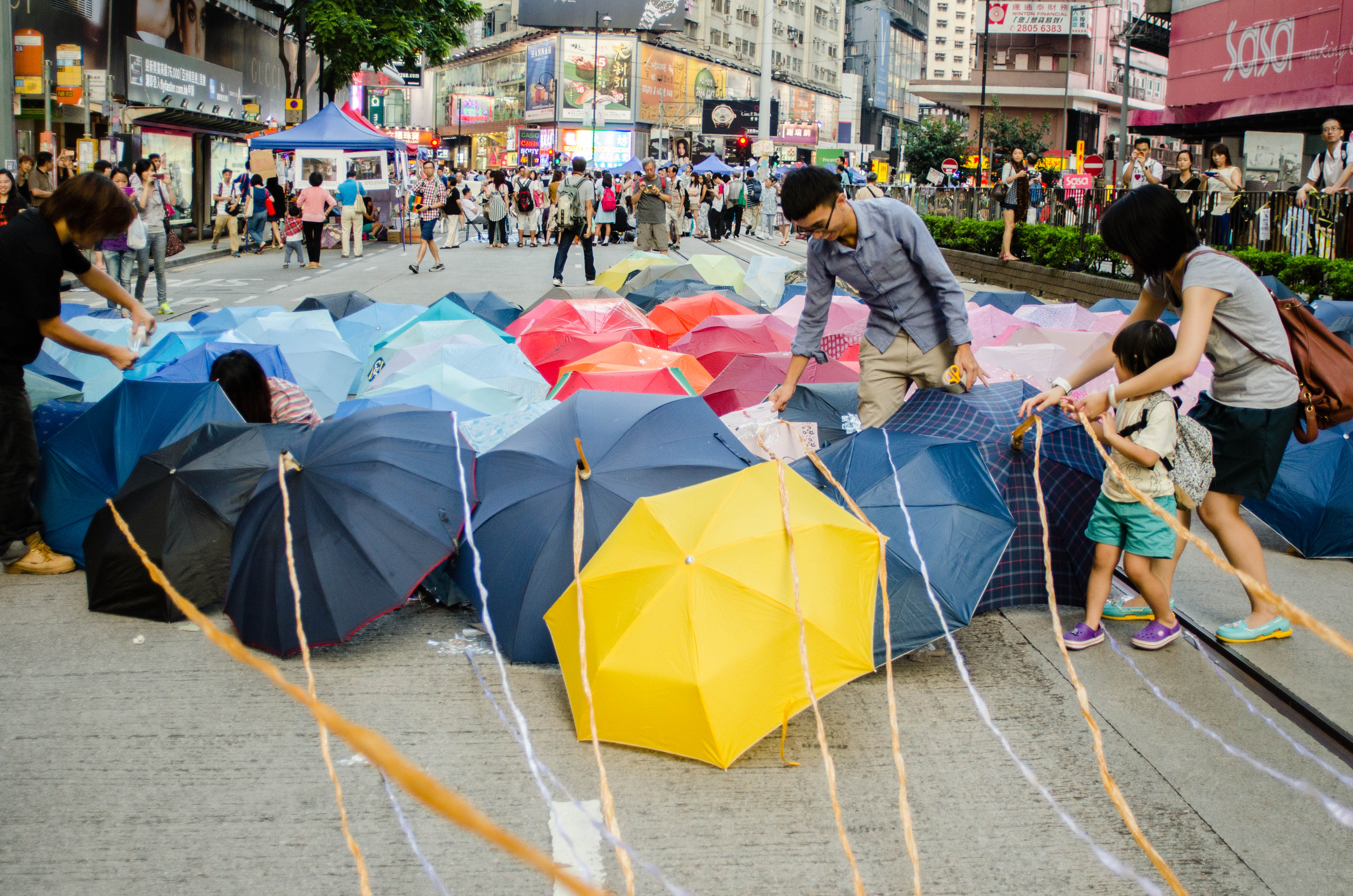
Pepper spray (Causeway Bay)

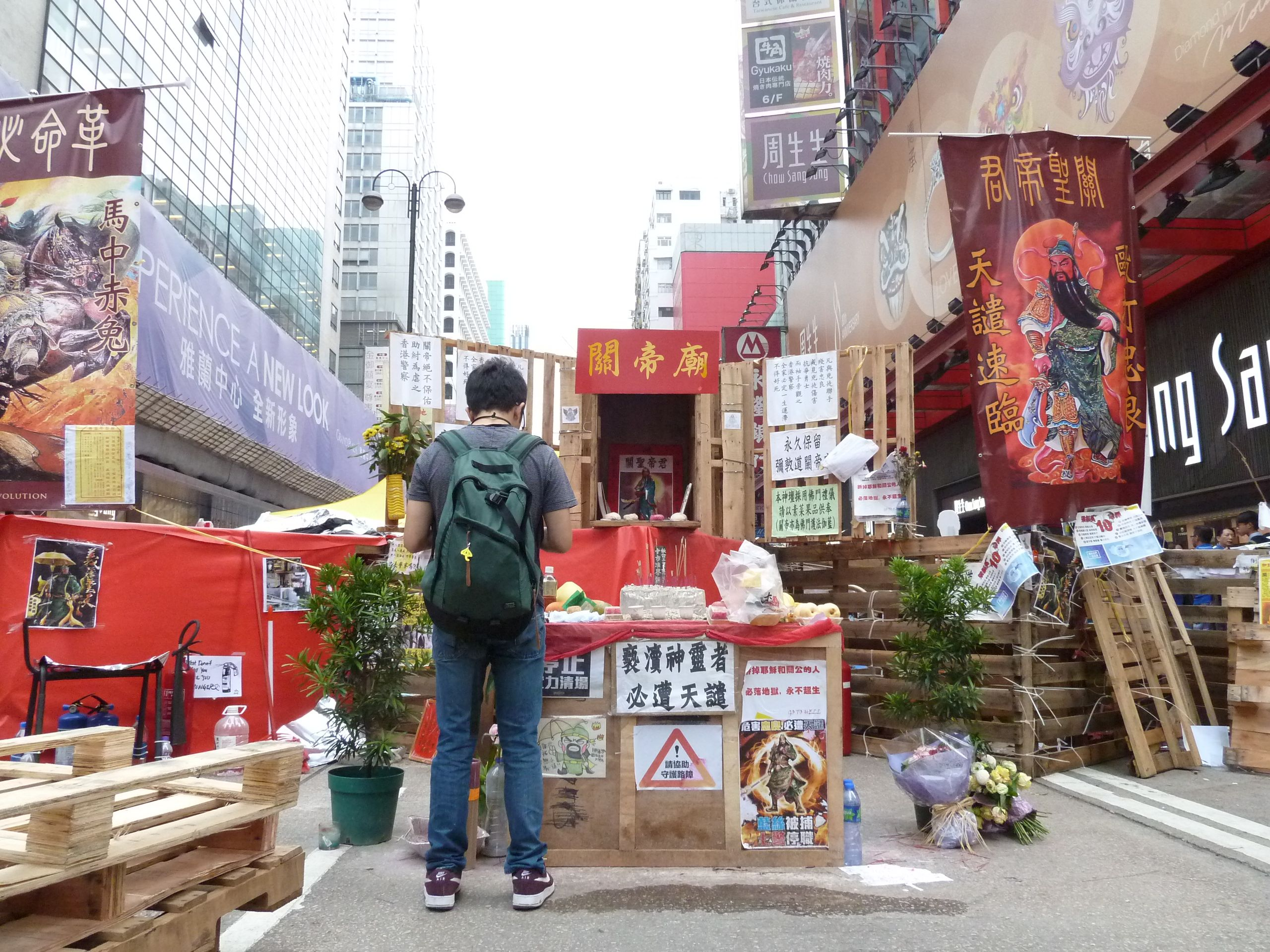
Shrine to Guan Yu (Mong Kok)

== Songs ==
"Do You Hear the People Sing?" from a musical, Les Miserables, is popular with locals; it is sung with adapted Cantonese lyrics with a pro-democracy message. The Chinese lyrics were written anonymously for the Occupy Central movement by a well-known lyricist. In a video recording posted to YouTube in May 2014, the song named "Who Hasn't Spoke Up Yet?" (問誰未發聲) was performed by a young girl. The video amassed 30 thousand hits in three days. Three different versions were posted to the OCLP Facebook page prior to the unofficial referendum on 22 June. By 29 September, after the tear gas attack by the HK police, the video had been viewed at least 900,000 times. At the HKIED graduation ceremony, one trumpeter played an impromptu solo of the song in support of the movement.

"Imagine" by John Lennon was adopted by suffragists following certain journals' criticism of them being "naïve dreamers". They began to quote in response the line "you may say I'm a dreamer, but I'm not the only one" from the lyrics onto banners and posters.

"Raise the Umbrella" (撐起雨傘) is specially created as encouragement to the movement by local musicians. The tune and original lyrics were written by a 25-year-old part-time musician Pan Lo (羅曉彬) after he witnessed first hand the release of tear gas by the police. He then presented the composition to Denise Ho, who wanted to take it further and suggested rewriting the lyrics to more closely fit with the mood and times. Ho then enlisted the support of other artistes, Anthony Wong, Kay Tse and Deanie Ip to record the song with her after Lin Xi had reworked the lyrics.

In a maiden political offering, David Cheang wrote deriding people who ignorantly or blindly opposed the Umbrella movement. The composition proved to be extremely popular on the internet, and was shared over 5,000 times. His song, "If I Call You a Stupid Dick, I'm Afraid You'd Be Mad" (話你戇鳩怕你嬲) employs Cantonese profanity in abundance, including in the title. The song lyrics start off from the perspective of a person who is fed up with the futility and inconvenience of the occupation, and then moves on to the viewpoint of another, who criticises his "friend" for polluting the earth with his bullshit. The opening lyrics managed to fool Hong Kong director Lee Lik-chi (who did not support the movement) into endorsing the song initially on his Facebook page, until the torrent of mocking posts made him delete the post.

Another song that had been used for protests was "Boundless Oceans, Vast Skies" (also translated as "Under a Vast Sky") by Hong Kong band, Beyond.

== Caricatures ==
The city's leader, CY Leung, elected in a small-circle election with 689 votes, is a favourite subject of caricature. He has been represented as a wolf (or as Lufsig, the Ikea soft toy), as Adolf Hitler, and as Mao Zedong. Alternatively, he is represented pejoratively by the numbers "689".

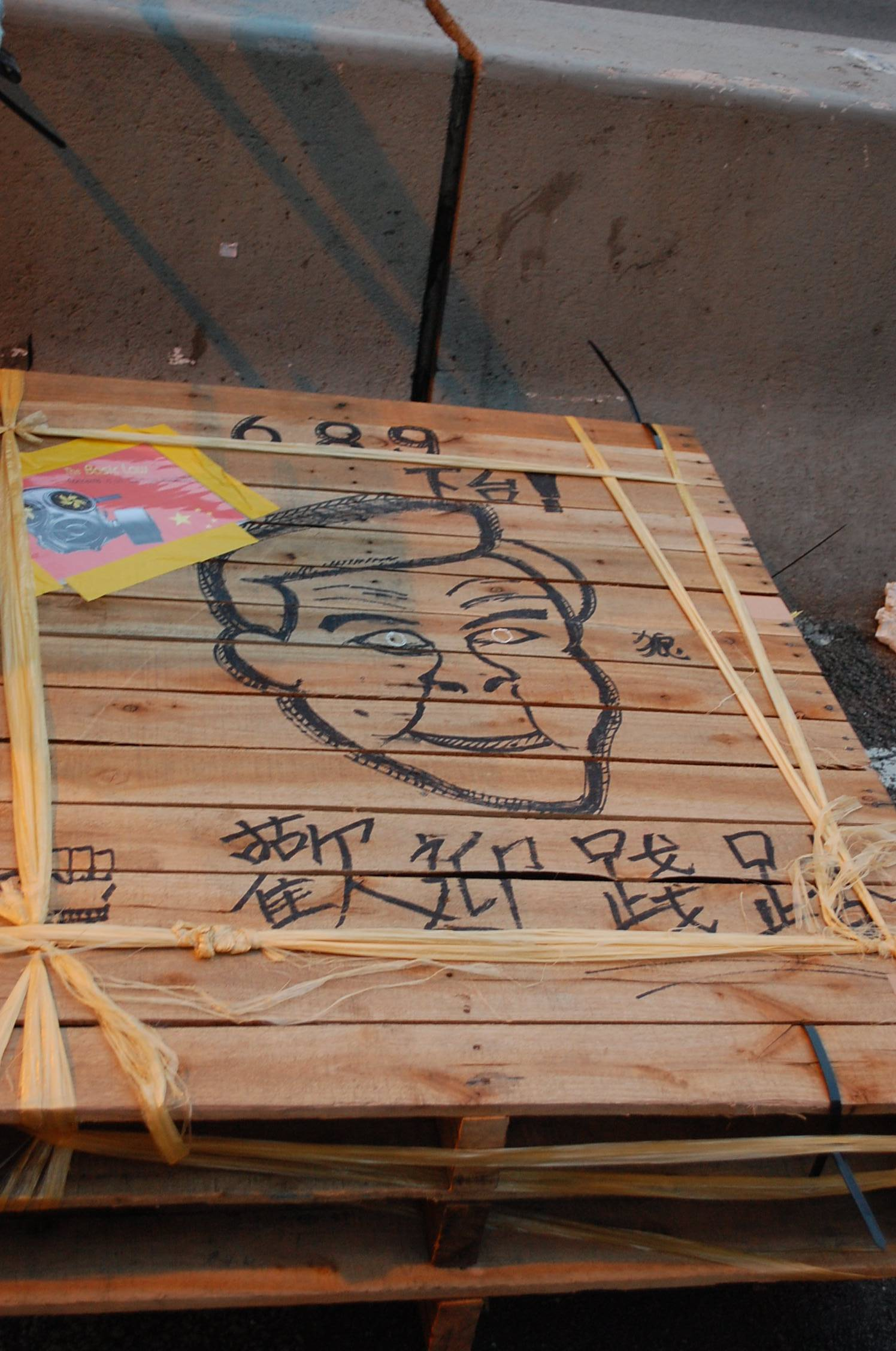
Caricature of CY Leung on a wooden step

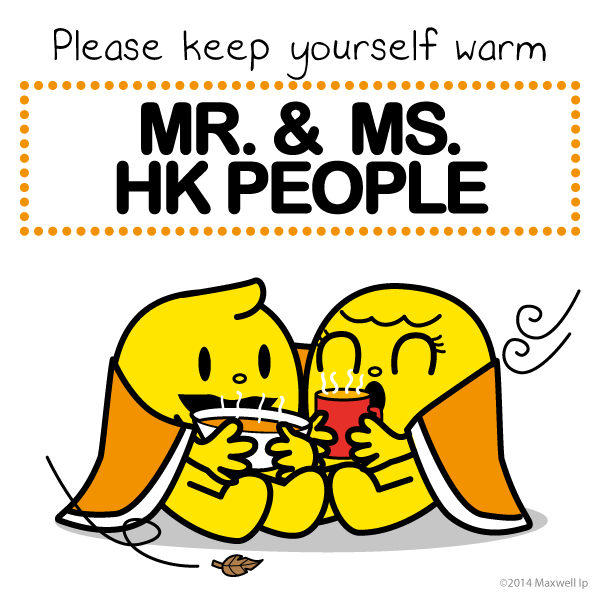
Mr and Ms HK People, by Maxwell Ip

=== "Mr and Ms. Hong Kong People" ===
"Mr and Little Miss Hong Kong People" is a series of caricatures that draws inspiration from Roger Hargreaves' Mr. Men series. A local graphic artist named Maxwell Ip drew a set of cartoon figures to explain the important figures behind the Umbrella movement. Originally created "just for fun", he created more once the popularity exploded, with the aim of providing suitable and politically neutral materials for parents to educate their children about the protests, and important figures involved. The concept accumulated over 64,000 "likes" in just over two weeks. Eight hours after the creation of "Mr 689" – the nickname of Hong Kong chief executive CY Leung, Ip's personal Facebook page of the character had more than 3,000 shares. The popularity led Ip to immediately create a public Facebook page for the characters, which are added as events unfold. In addition to the cute wolf that caricatures "Mr 689", other popular characters include "Mr Tear" (after the tear gas episode of 28 September), "Mr Chow & Mr Shum" (after the HKFS leaders Alex Chow and Lester Shum), "Mr 4 pm" (after Steve Hui of the PR section of the HK Police – who appeared on television at 4 pm daily), "Little Miss Lam Cheng" (after the Chief secretary Carrie Lam Cheng Yuet-ngor) "Mr Hungry" (after Mok Siu Man, who started a hunger strike on 2 October that lasted 40 days) and "Little Miss Ip Cancer" (after former secretary for security Regina Ip). Some of the characters' names are English crossovers from Cantonese or hybrids – for example, the character of Joshua Wong is named "Mr. G Phone", after his Chinese name.

== Parodies of Xi Jinping and police banners ==
Since an image of General Secretary of the Chinese Communist Party Xi Jinping holding an umbrella won a top photojournalism award in China on 22 October, Xi has been parodied with a cut-out version where the umbrella has been made yellow. The edited image has appeared on stickers, posters, banners and life-size and oversize banners. Apple Daily reports that there are at least 13 cardboard cut-outs of general secretary Xi Jinping in Mong Kok, three in Causeway Bay, and one huge vertical banner depicting the image hanging from the pedestrian bridge in Admiralty. These cut-outs, many overwritten with pro-democracy or anti-communist slogans, are popular props for mainland visitors with which to take photographs.

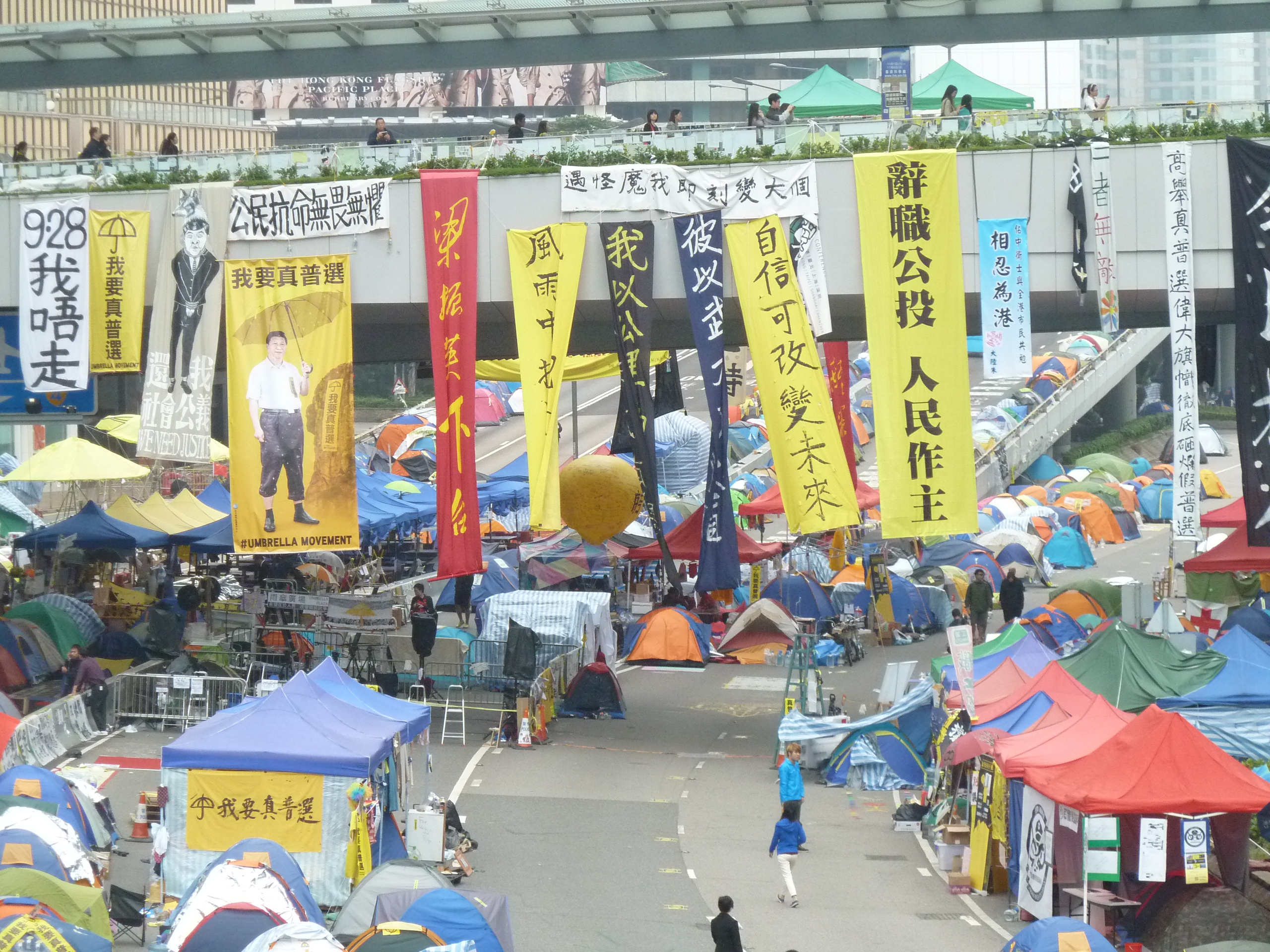
To the left, Xi Jinping banner amidst others on the Harcourt Road pedestrian bridge

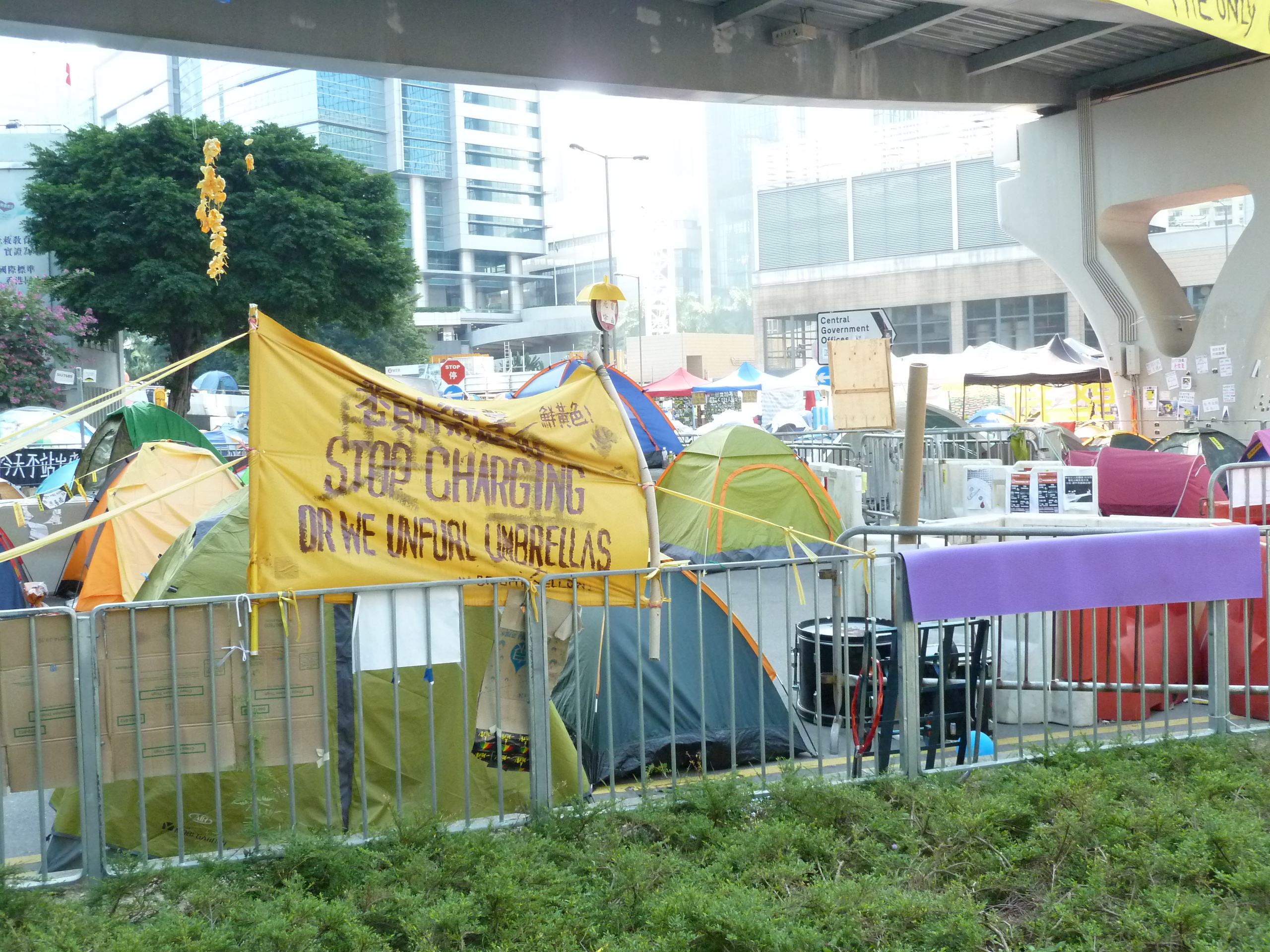
Parody of police banner: "Stop Charging or We Unfurl Umbrellas"

== Umbrella Man statue ==
Umbrella Man is a 10-foot (3 m) high wooden statue created by a 22-year-old artist using the name "Milk" during the protests. The inspiration for the woodblock statue, symbolising freedom and peace, was a photograph of a suffragist holding an umbrella over a police officer to shield him from the rain. The statue is constructed of plywood of ordinary wood tint on a metal frame. Those blocks making up the face are white, symbolising pepper spray used by the police on the suffragists; the umbrella is yellow. It was constructed by the artist aided by a group of ten people.

It rapidly become an icon for the occupation movement upon its appearance on the demonstration site on 5 October 2014, and photographs of it have appeared on the front page of many newspapers and on websites around the world. The media have compared it to the Goddess of Democracy statue erected during the 1989 Tiananmen Square protests and massacre. Since the large statue appeared, other versions emerged – a miniature woodblock version, as well as other materials, were created by others.

Umbrella Man in Umbrella Square

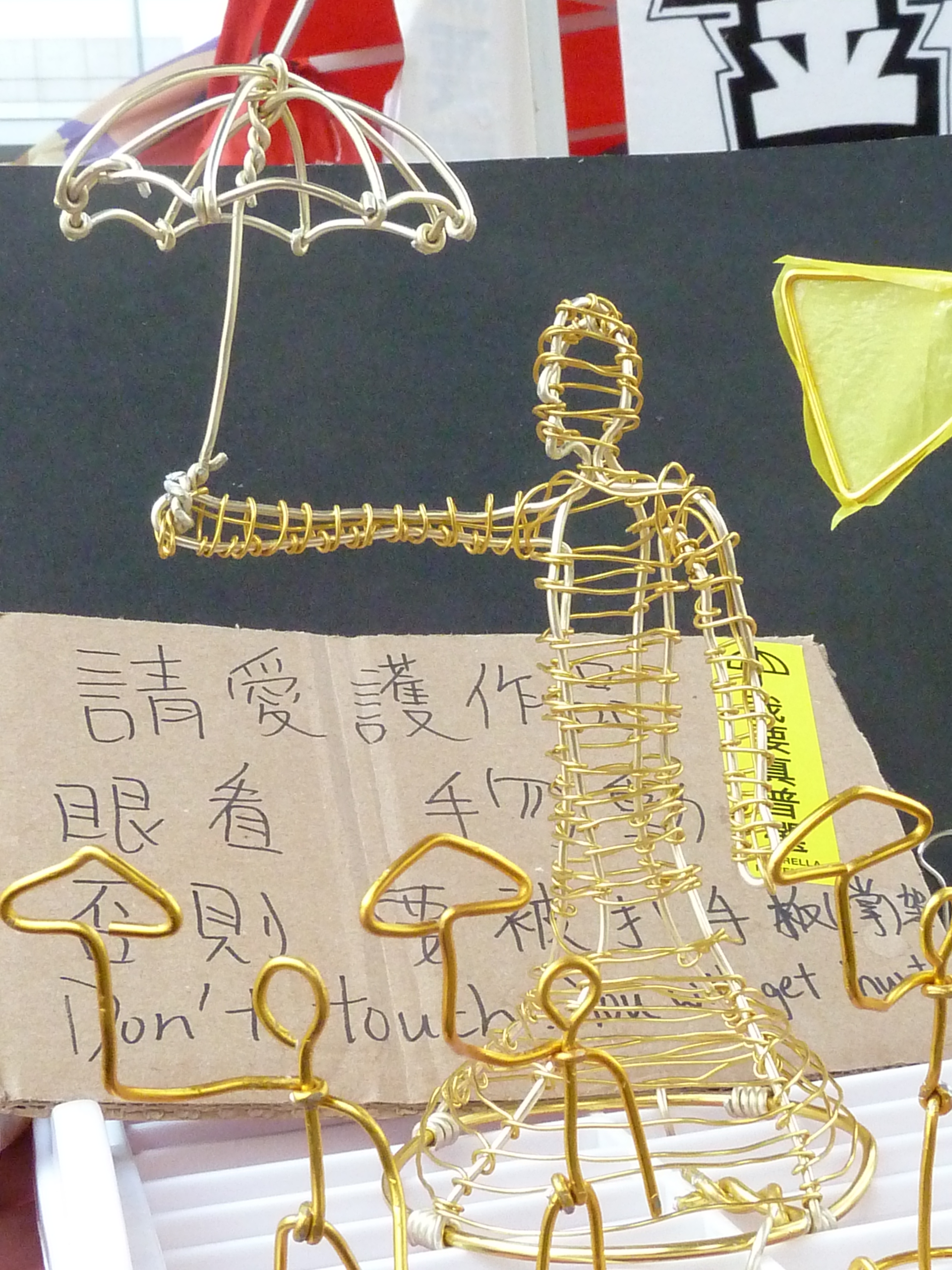
Wire statues

== Message boards ==
Numerous walls or vertical spaces within the Umbrella Square were adorned with posters and messages of encouragement during the protests. Barricades and buses that were abandoned on the streets in Mong Kok after crowds started gathering became makeshift message boards.

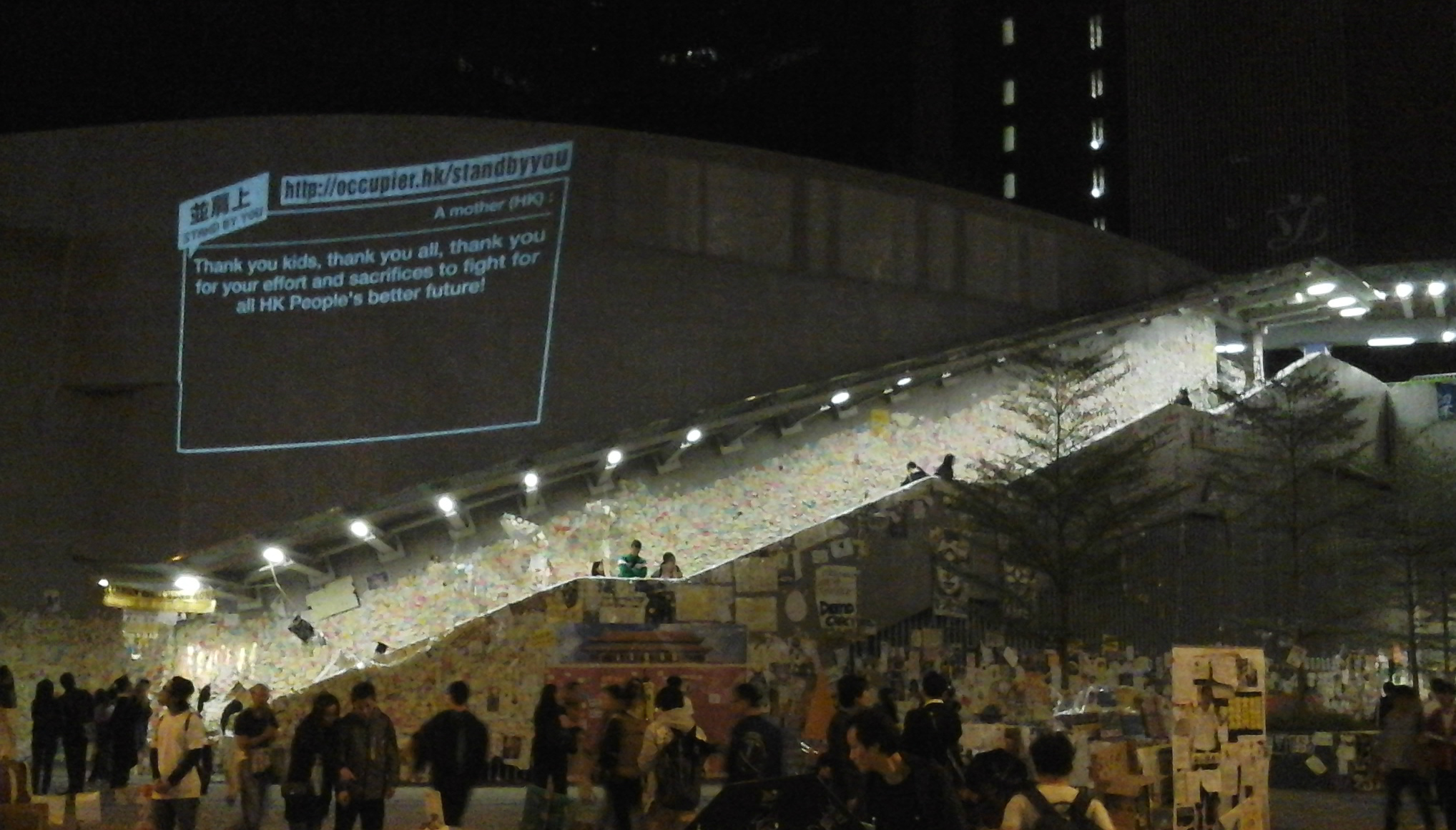
Lennon Wall with a projected message from "Add Oil Machine"

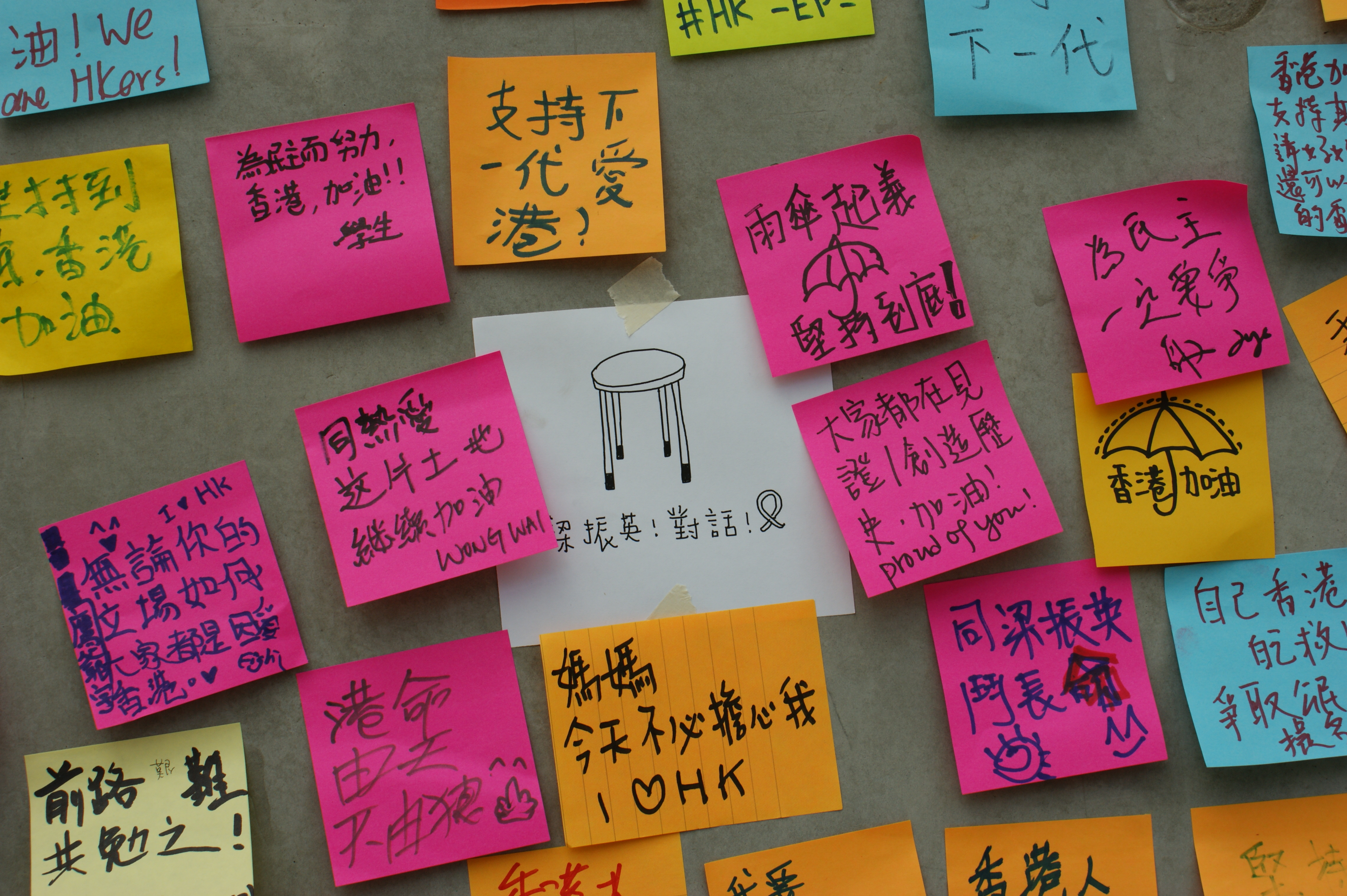
Close-up of post-its on the Lennon Wall

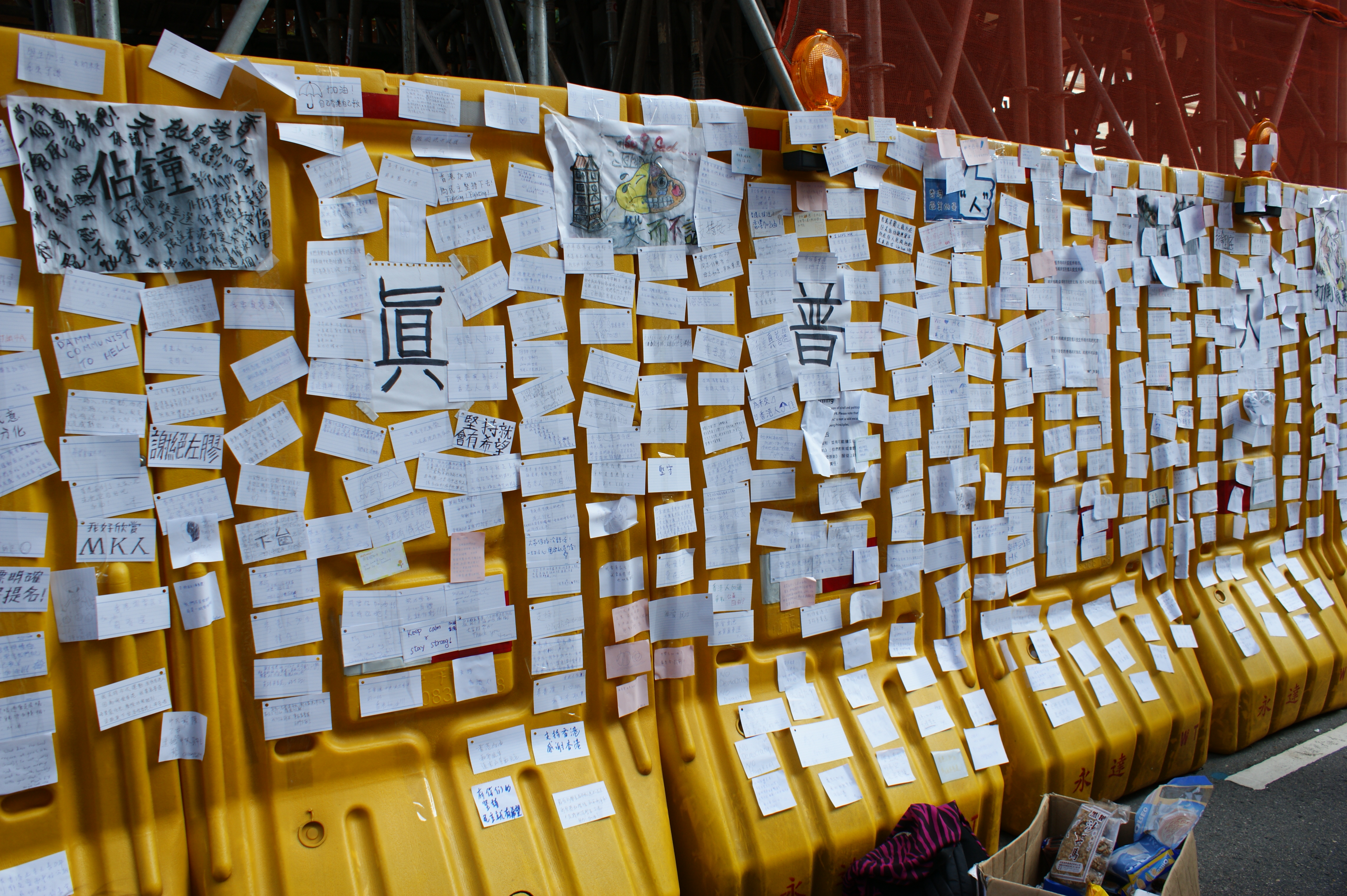
Road barricade serving as message board

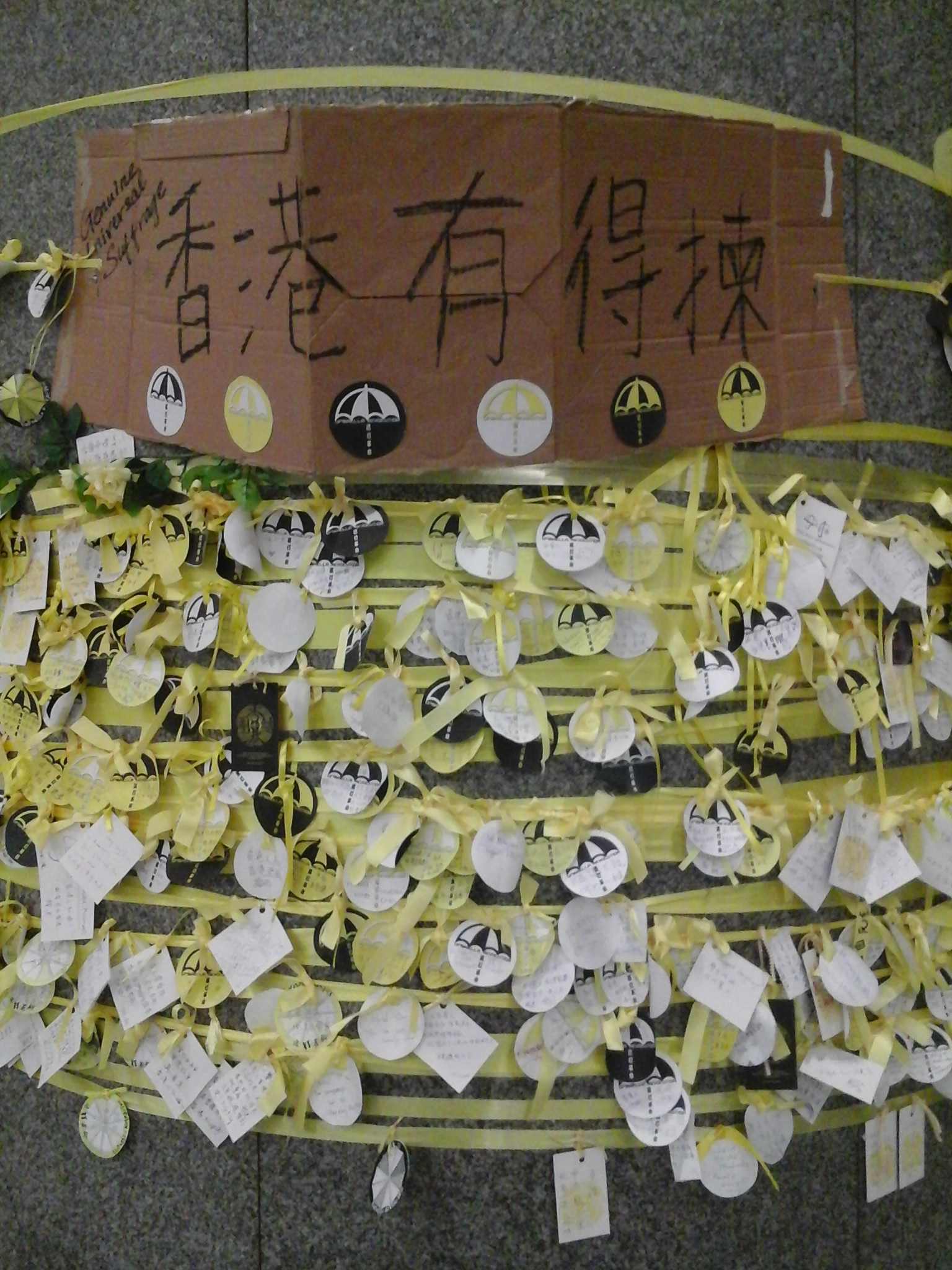
Message board with printed cards

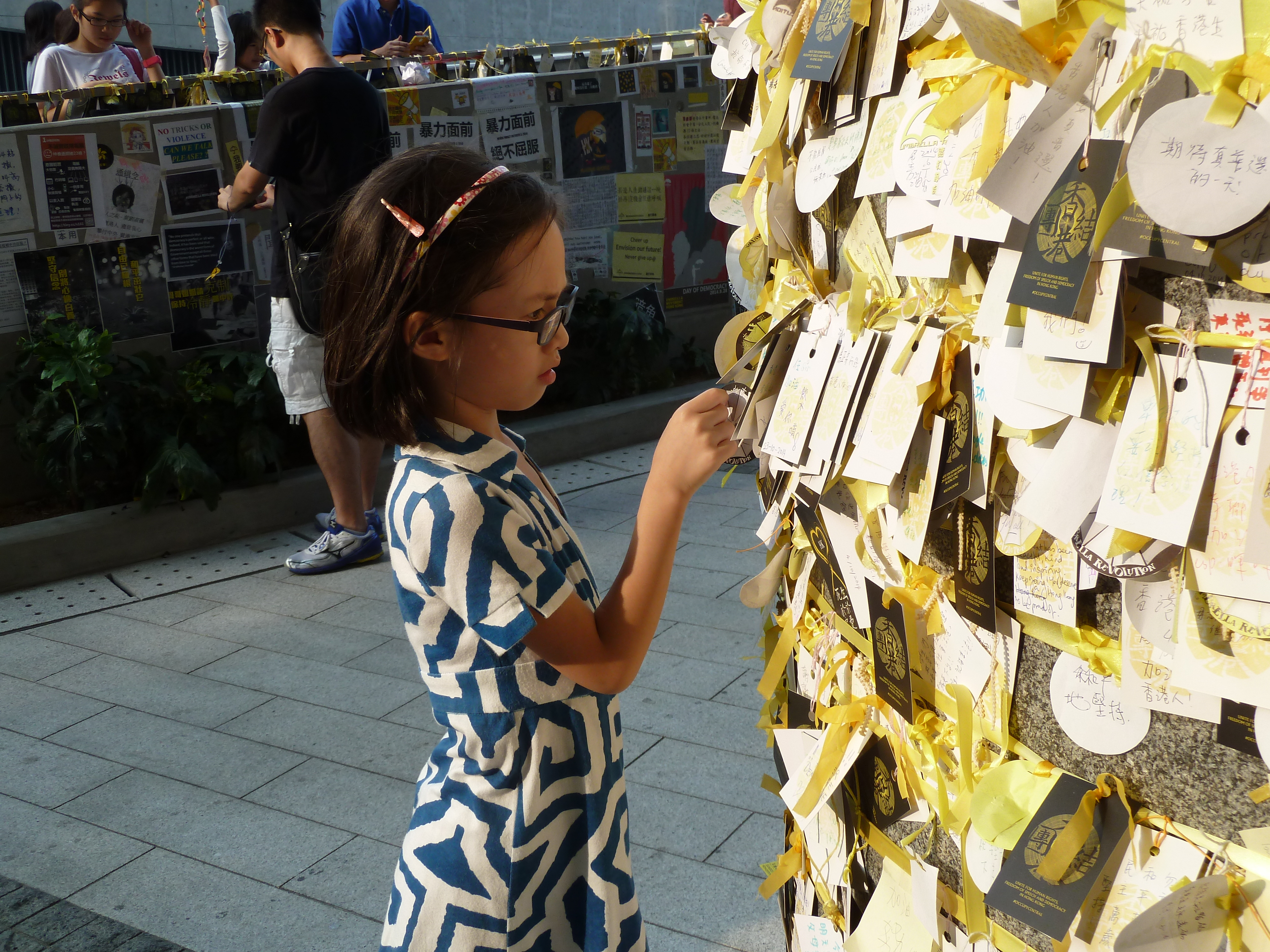
Girl inspects messages on a pillar

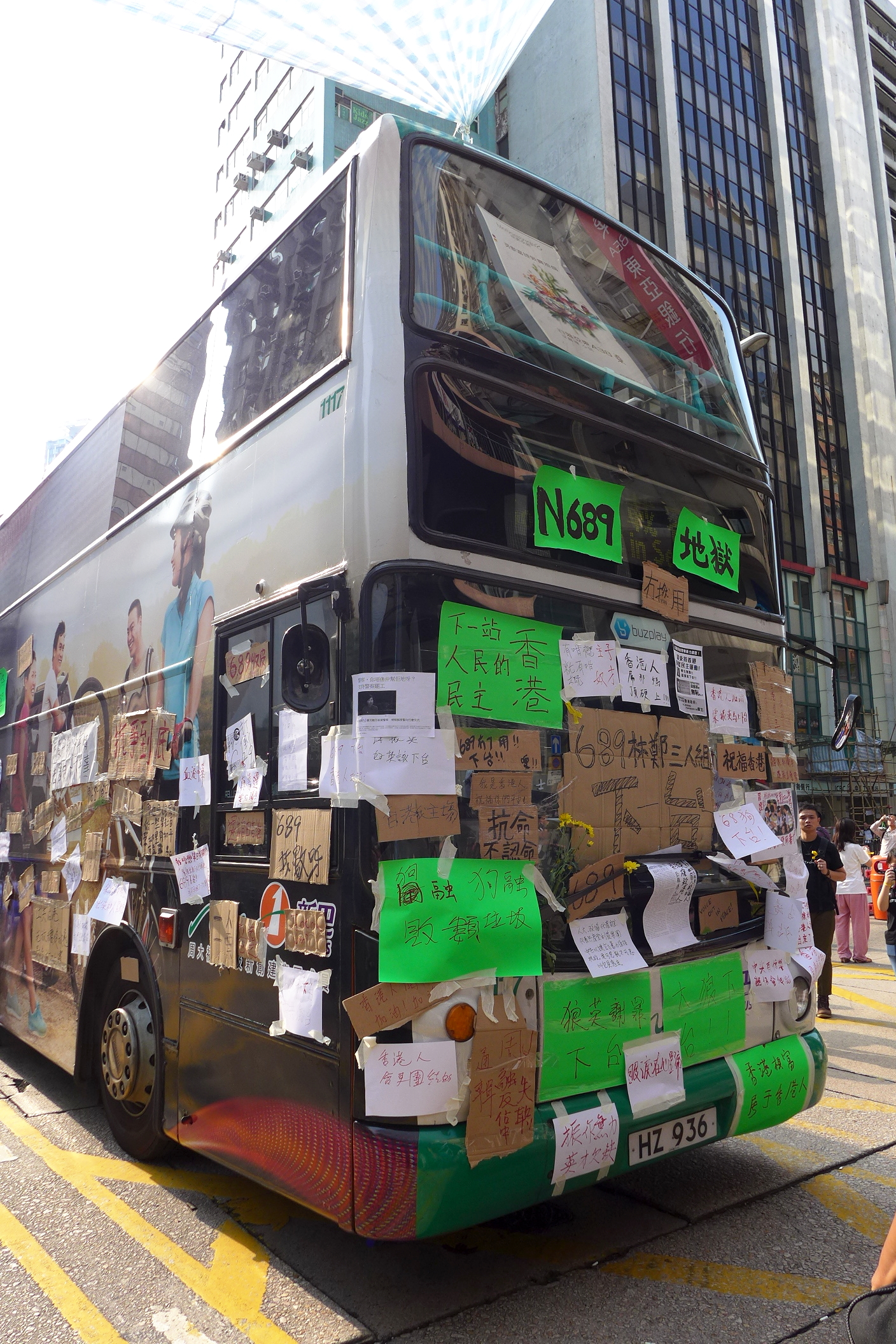
Bus No. 689 to Hell, a bulletin board

=== The Lennon Wall ===
The Lennon Wall, a namesake of the one in Prague, is a stretch of curved staircase in the Central Government Complex that has been covered in multi-coloured handwritten post-it notes from supporters. The messages, written mainly in Chinese and English but also other languages, include calls for genuine democracy, for CY Leung to step down as Chief executive, words of encouragement, and praise for the peacefulness of the protests.

=== "Stand By You: 'Add Oil' Machine" ===
An art collective called "Stand By You: 'Add Oil' Machine" launched a project that aimed to display messages of support to protesters. The name refers to "add oil", a term of encouragement in Chinese. The project included a website where people from all over the world could send messages, which in turn were projected onto the side of a building. More than 30,000 messages have been received by the project from 70 countries. The "Stand by You" project received messages of support from, among others, Pussy Riot and Peter Gabriel, all of whom were photographed with open umbrellas. Peter Gabriel said: "Water gets everywhere – like the will of the people".

The project received the first prize of the 2015 Freedom Flowers Foundation Awards.

== Lion Rock ==
Marking the expansion phase of the protest movement, a group of suffragists scaled the Lion Rock, an iconic natural landmark overlooking Kowloon that carries the meaning as Hong Kong's special identity The group of 14 mountaineers calling themselves "Hong Kong Spidie" (香港蜘蛛仔) pinned a vertical 28 by 6 metres (92 by 20 ft) banner to the rock face that was visible throughout much of Kowloon. The operation was documented in a video that was put on YouTube. The banner, which read "I want real universal suffrage" (in Chinese), was removed the following day by fire services aided by a helicopter in an action that took approximately 1 1/2 hours. Within days, similar banners were seen on top of Tai Mo Shan and Fei Ngo Shan, placed by persons unknown – HK Spidie denied responsibility. The banner at Fei Ngo Shan measured 5 by 20 metres (16 by 66 ft). A 9-metre (30 ft) horizontal banner was put up under cover of darkness near the radar station for the observatory at Tai Mo Shan, Hong Kong's highest peak. Upon receiving a report from a citizen at 9 am, fire services had removed the banner by noon. A government spokesman said that its removal was driven strictly by safety considerations.

Inspired by the giant yellow banner on the face of Lion Rock, other artists have created models and parodies of the image. A professor at the Polytechnic University's Department of Applied Mathematics set an examination question on how to calculate the position and angle for an optimum photograph of the Lion Rock banner. The movement also issued a challenge to put up ten banners for each one removed (拆一掛十). Large banners have been photographed in many city roadways such as overhead pedestrian crossings in Tai Po and Kwun Tong. Students at a number of schools hoisted such banners on school premises – one appeared at the elite Diocesan Boys' School on the occasion of its annual school fete. Police have issued public reminders that unauthorised erection of street banners may be subject to fines.

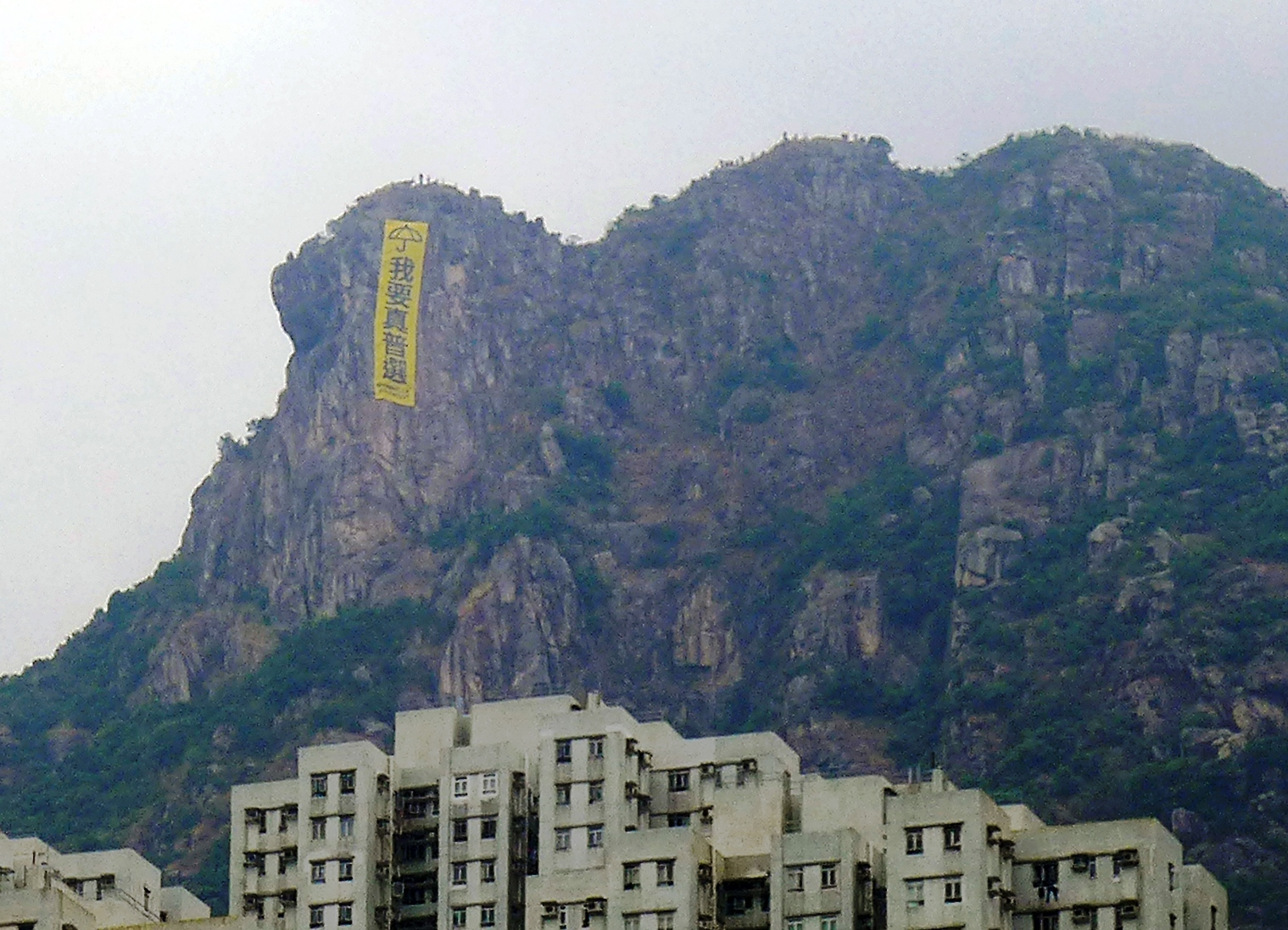
A 28-metre yellow banner which read "I want real universal suffrage" was hung on the Lion Rock.

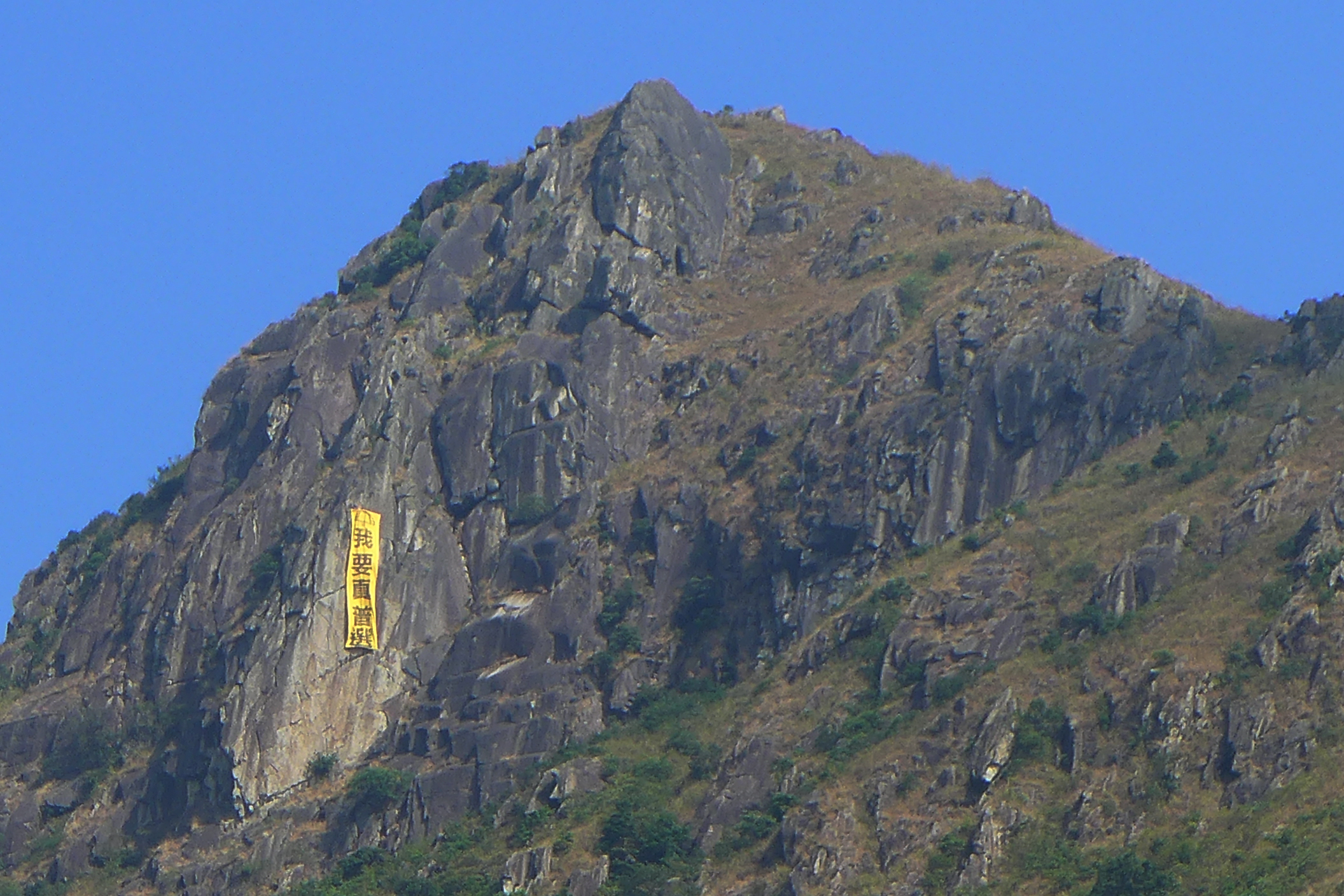
A 20-metre yellow banner hanging from Kowloon Peak

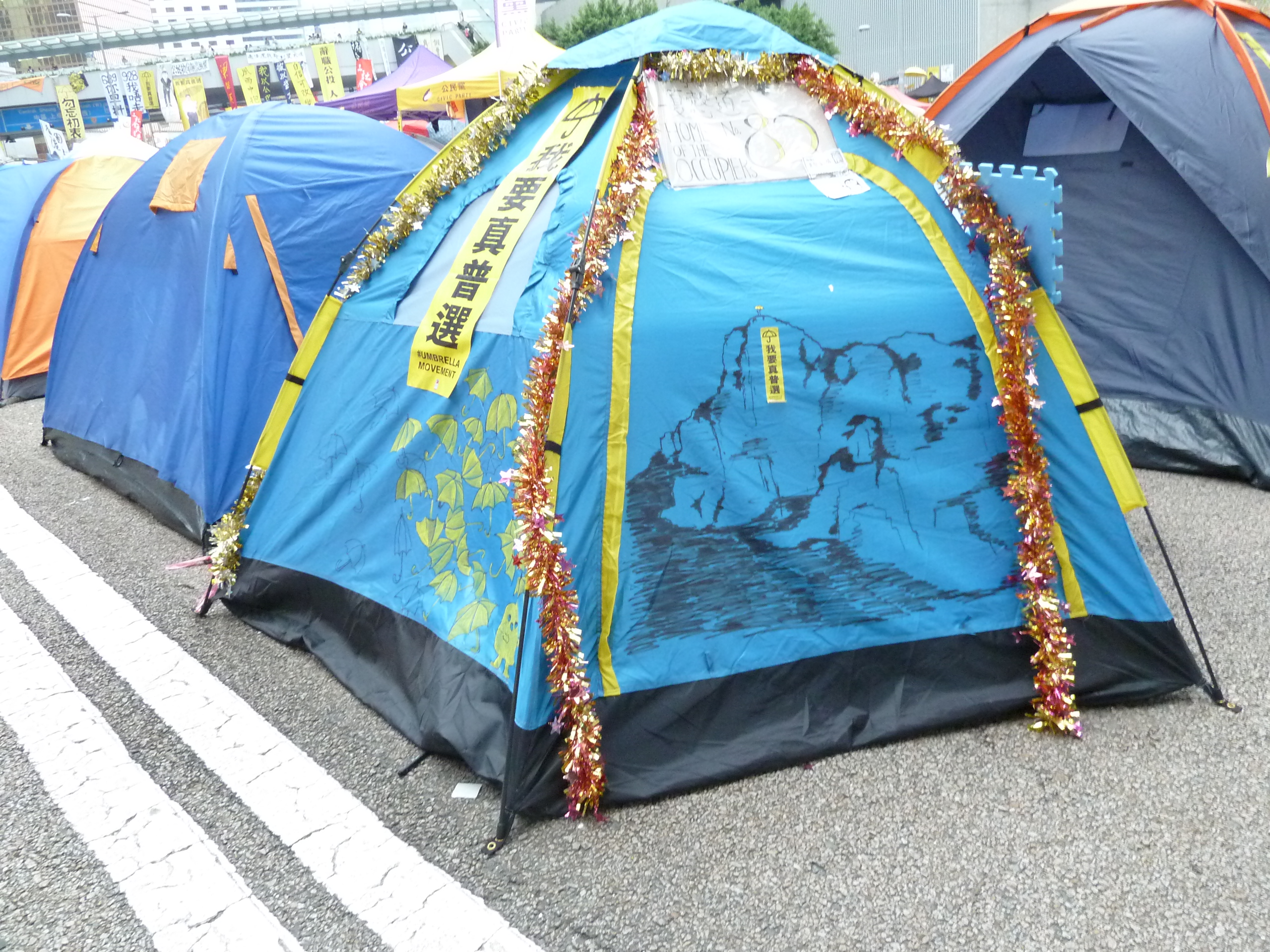
Lion Rock meme drawn on tent in Admiralty

== Vernacular ==
The existence of homophones in Chinese language allows great potential for wordplay that replacing characters with similar tones, or pitch patterns can effect significant changes in meaning. Although Chinese is full of idioms, popular sayings, customs, jokes that rely on wordplay, the Beijing leadership has imposed a ban on wordplay in broadcasting as such use ostensibly breaches the law on spoken and written Chinese. Critics believe the ban is aimed at making it illegal to criticise the leadership and/or its policies in veiled manner, whilst avoiding censorship.

Academics have noted that the protests have resulted in the unprecedented creation of new Cantonese terms that contain political puns and special idioms. There has also been a resurgence in Cantonese usage, countering the trend imposed by Beijing to expand use of Standard Chinese (aka Mandarin or Putonghua) in the place of "dialects", which is defined to include Cantonese.

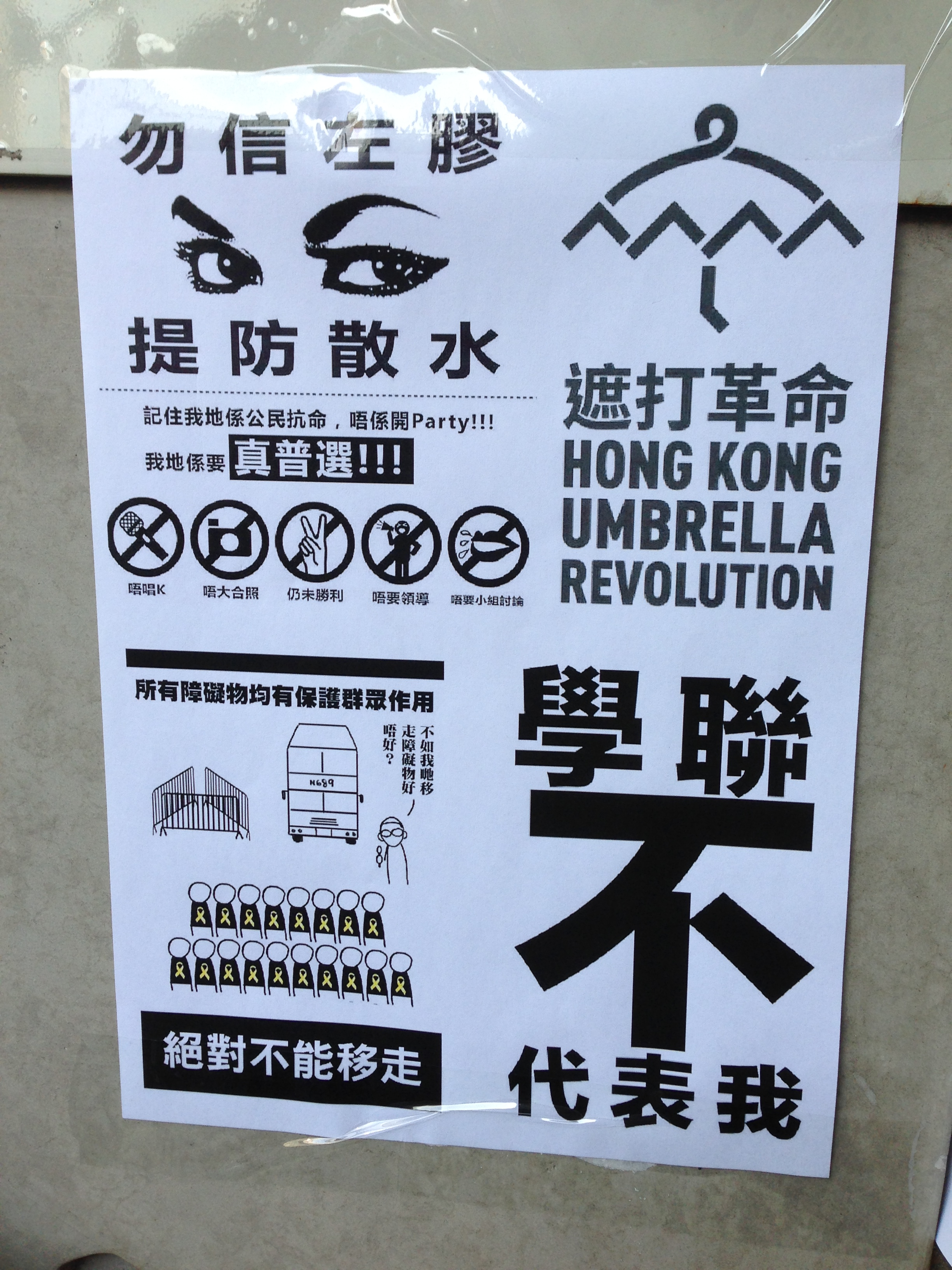
Don't trust "left plastics"

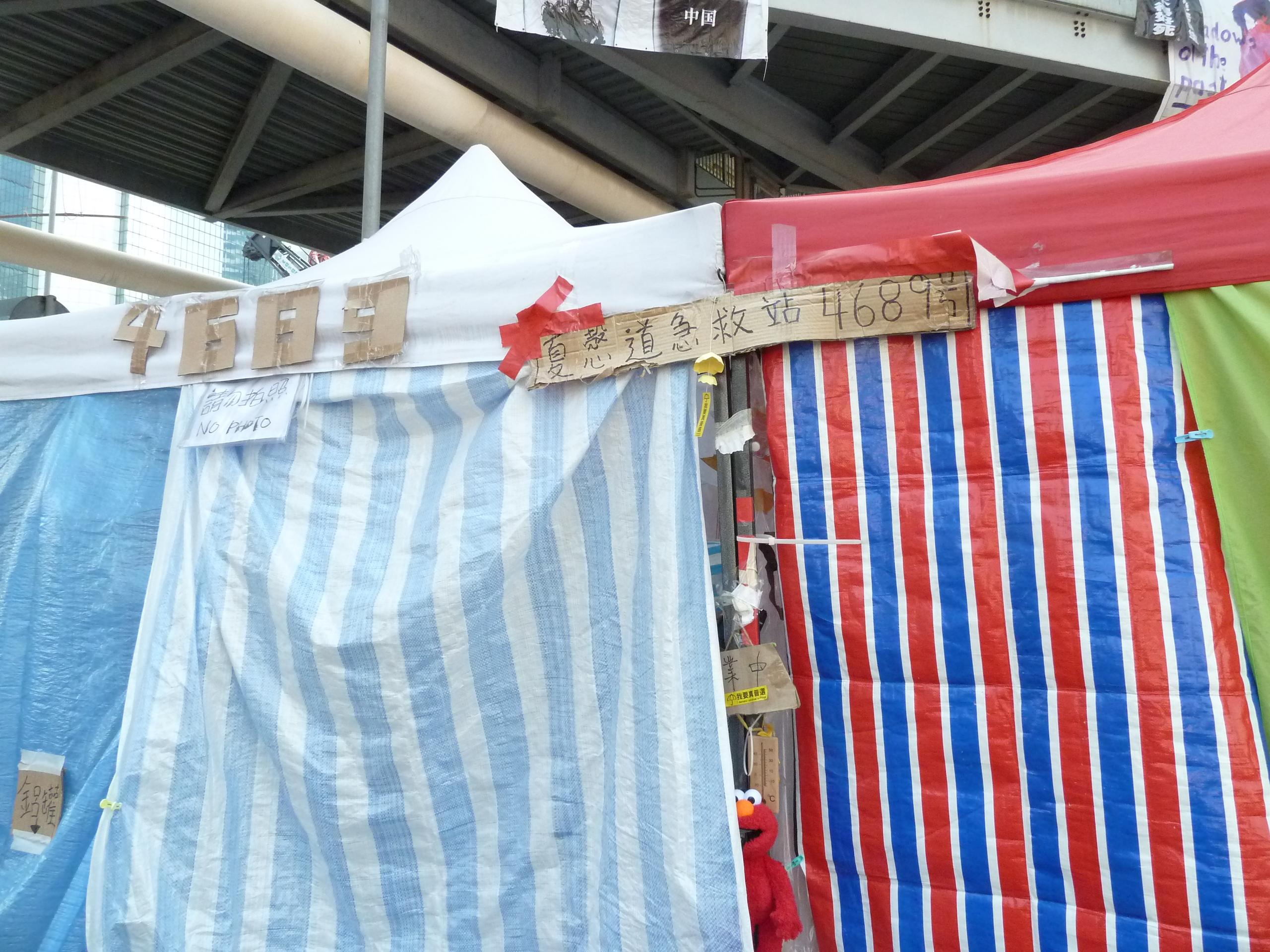
"Harcourt Road 4689" First Aid Station

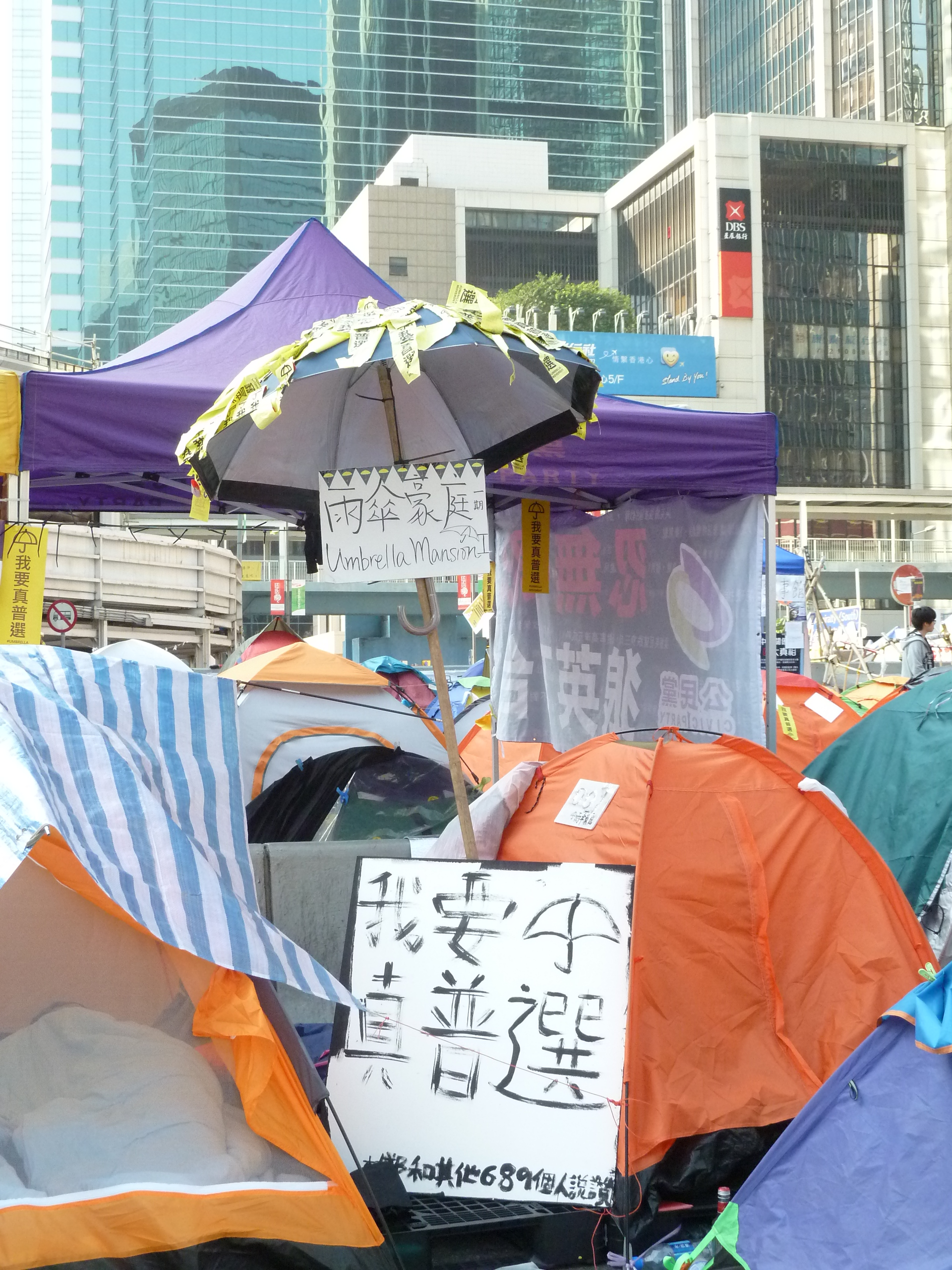
"Umbrella Mansion"

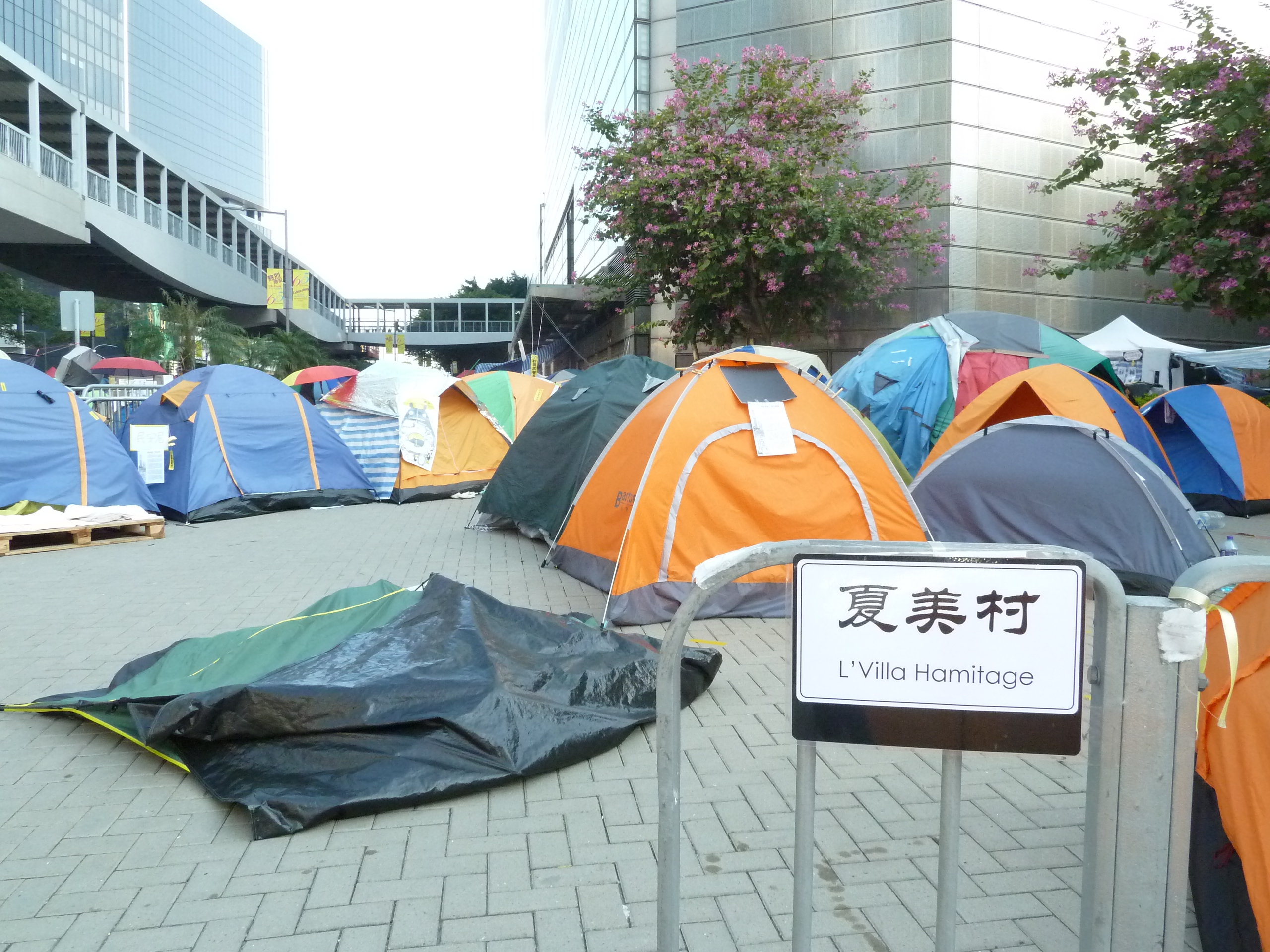
"Villa Hamitage"

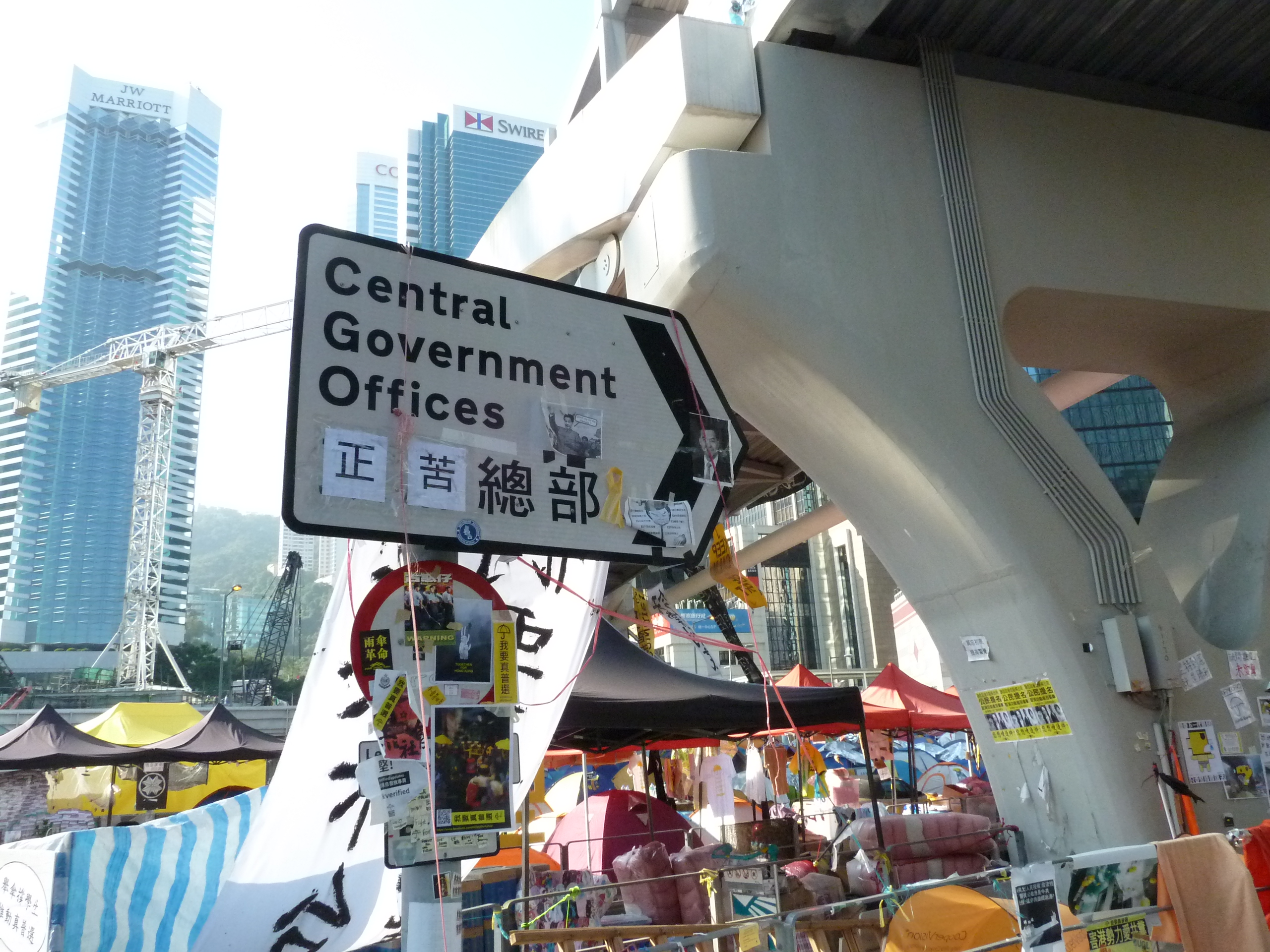
Chinese characters read "really bitter headquarters"

The new lexicon of protest incorporates the term "left plastic" (左膠), a derogative term used by students to refer to "leftists/moderates". There is also "gau wu" (鳩嗚), a vulgar homophone of a term in Mandarin which means "to shop" (購物) – the character substitution transforms the original meaning into "to occupy the streets in protest".

The encampments are referred to as "villages", road signs have been changed pointing to social change; occupiers' flimsy tents have often been given grandiose addresses such as "Umbrella Court" or "Democracy Gardens", parodying names given to luxury property developments in an increasingly unaffordable city.

A glossary of the terms affiliated with the Umbrella Movement protests was created online, at umbrellaterms.hk.

== The "Umbrella Man" photo ==
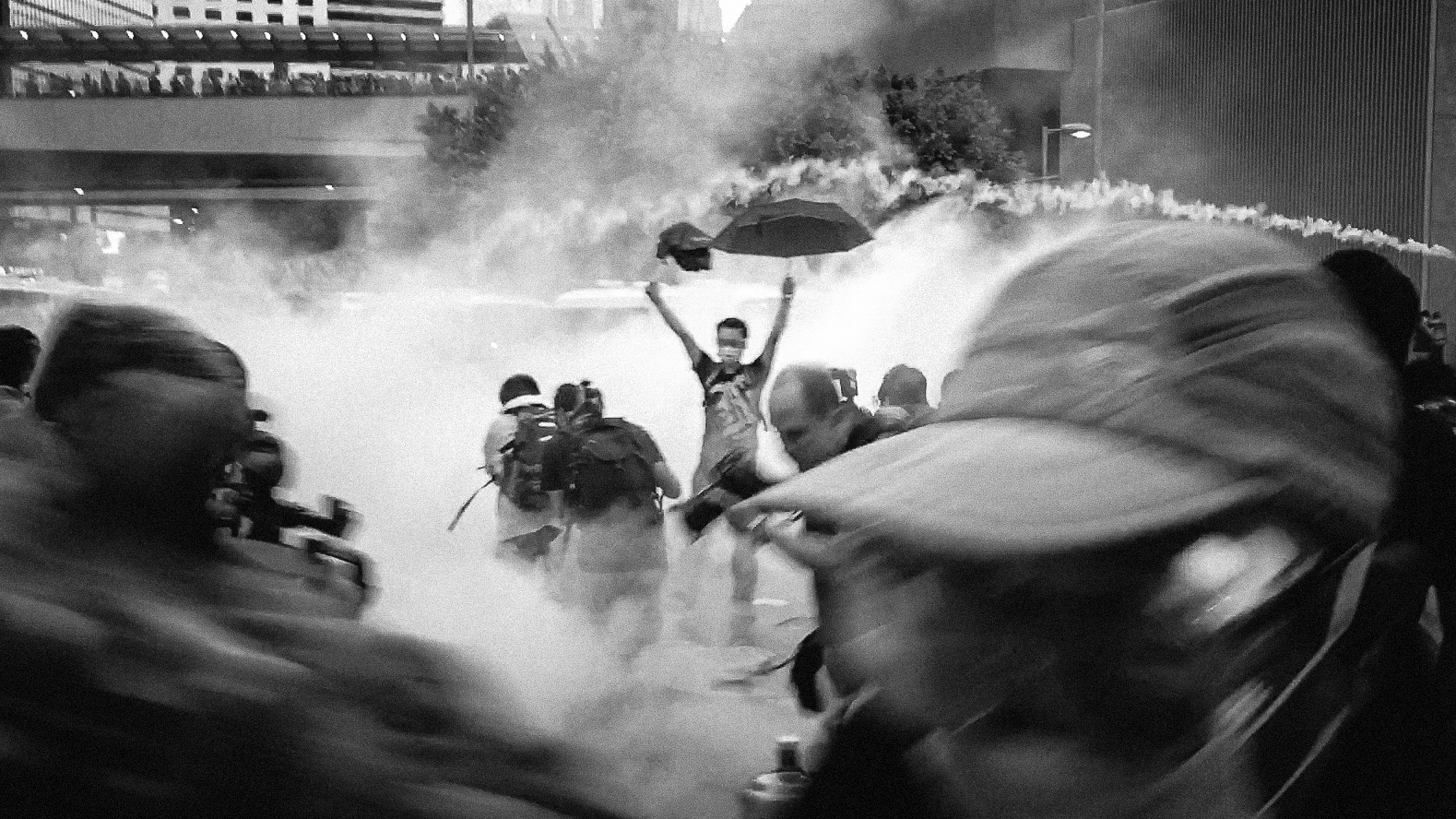
The photo of Umbrella Man

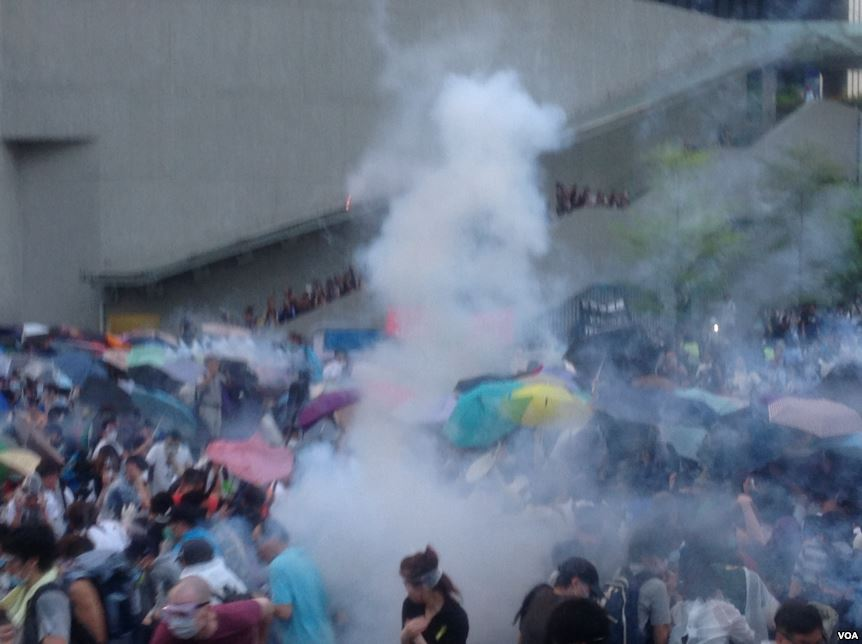
Hong Kong Police Force decided to employ tear gas on peacefully protesting suffragists

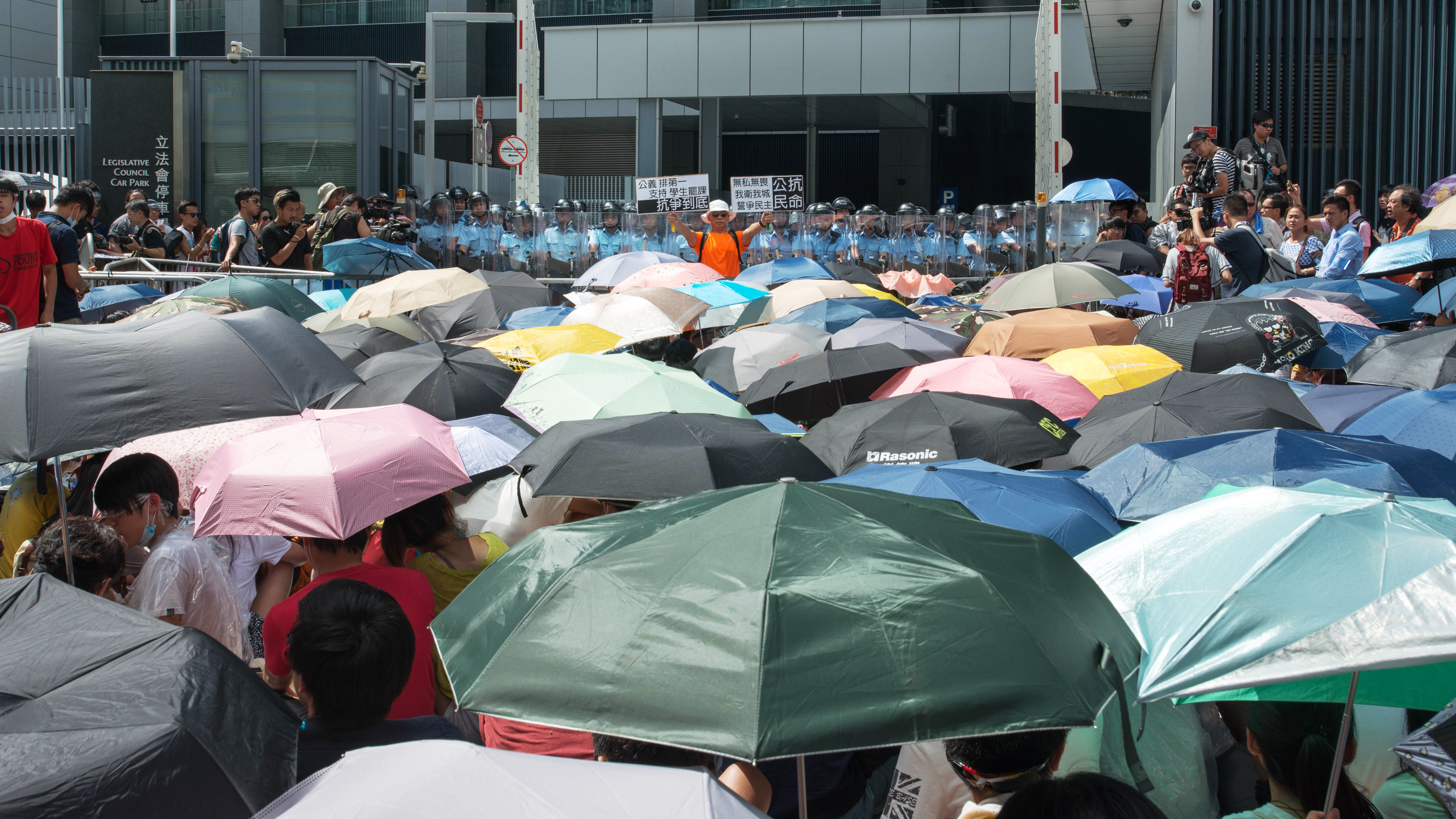
Protesters shielding themselves from tear gas and water cannons with umbrellas

The photo of Umbrella Man, taken 28 September 2014, depicts an unnamed male protester holding an umbrella in each hand while walking through tear gas fired by riot police. Business Insider has described the photo as iconic. It has been re-tweeted thousands of times along with multiple similar photographs tweeted during the protest, which show individuals using umbrellas to protect themselves from tear gas and water. The picture's popularity and that of other pictures caused the media to dub the protests, which were also called the Occupy Central movement, the "Umbrella Revolution".

== Preservation ==
Two groups are involved in efforts to preserve the artwork. The Umbrella Movement Visual Archive and Research Collective, founded by Wen Yau and Sampson Wong, aims to document "how people form a community here, and how they transform the space". The collective has 10 teams of volunteers to photograph and interview those who have participated in the protests, and digitally preserve protest objects, indicate their location, and include creators' thoughts and inspirations for the works. It will create a website with interactive map and images of all the pieces. The group is co-operating with Umbrella Movement Art Preservation, led by Meaghan McGurgan and Kacey Wong, which has made an inventory of works and their location, and will grab certain pieces before the police clear the site. The preservation groups feel it important not to denude the works of their context unless it is unavoidable. Although many of the artists have given approval for their eventual removal, not all are agreed. Some artists, such as the creator of The Happy Gadfly, however, would like to see documented how his work is destroyed in the clearance. As to their storage, the groups have been rebuffed or ignored by the city's museums, most of which are government funded, due to the political nature of the work. Some galleries have volunteered to take and store them until a permanent home for them can be found.

Every night over two months of occupation, volunteers made a note of objects worthy of preservation. Following weeks of discussions, a shortlist of items for salvage and preservation were selected, based on historical and aesthetic criteria. The day prior to the announced clearance of the Admiralty occupation site, 30 volunteers from the art preservation unit started salvage operations. Over 150 works and artefacts were collected from the three sites (about 100 from Admiralty, 30 from Mong Kok and 20 from Causeway Bay). Pieces include a desk, bench, and the sign for the study area, banners, and over 20,000 messages from the Lennon Wall, which had been covered four layers deep and eventually filled 10 large bags. The project will individually scan all the messages.

== See also ==
- Art of the 2019 Hong Kong protests

== External media ==
- Facebook page, Umbrella Movement Art Preservation
- "The political art behind the umbrella revolution – video". Channel 4. 19 October 2014
- CNN video on YouTube
- "Art in Umbrella Movement Part I" The Works, RTHK, 8 October 2014
- Facebook video from AJ+ about the creation of the umbrella canopy
- Art of the Umbrella Movement on YouTube
