= Wen Yau =

Wen Yau is a performance artist and curator known for her exhibitions related to social and political discourses on art, especially in the context of Hong Kong.

== Career ==
Between 2005 and 2006, Wen Yau conducted a research project called Hong Kong On The Move Performance Art Project that documented and archived Hong Kong performance art history. In 2007, she produced "TengSeWong/VoiceWriter on the Basic Law", a performance art exhibition which used translation and transcription software to illustrate linguistic divides in Hong Kong.

In 2013, she presented the exhibition "I am a Grade D Artist", which featured a collection of artworks that Wen Yau created over 2 years in preparation of the public art examinations in Hong Kong. It reflects on Hong Kong's education system and whether it is possible for young artists to foster creativity within formal art training. In 2011, Yau sat the Visual Arts exam for the Hong Kong Certificate of Education Examination (HKCEE), which she received a Grade D after presenting an artwork that was unconventional to the examiners. After 2 years of formal training in painting to "reestablish" her own sense of aesthetics and technical skills, the artist participated in another exam at the Hong Kong Advanced Level Examination (HKALE). In this exam, she attained a grade D again. Art critic Ting Wing Yan Vivian considered the exhibition to be an intervention that questions the absurdity of the art education system.

In 2015, Wen Yau carried out "Wish you were here", a 4 hours long performance at Venice International Performance Art Week, blindfolded with the national flag of the People's Republic of China, as a response to the Occupy Central with Love and Peace movement that took place in 2014 in Hong Kong. In 2017, she curated the exhibition "Takeover/Handover 2.0".
