= Fite =

Fite may refer to:

== People ==
- Bobby Fite (born 1968), American film and television actor
- Charlene Fite (born 1950), American politician
- C.J. Fite (born 2005), American football player
- Gilbert Fite (1918–2010), American historian
- Harvey Fite (1903–1976), American sculptor and painter
- Lanny Fite (born c. 1949), American politician
- Lea Fite (1955–2009), American state legislator from Alabama
- Linda Fite, American comics writer and editor
- Mark Fite, American actor and comedian
- Nina Maria Fite, American diplomat
- Rankin Fite (1916–1980), American state legislator and attorney
- Samuel McClary Fite (1816–1875), American politician
- Tim Fite, American musician
- Warner Fite (1867–1955), American philosopher
- Wendell Fite (born 1965), American DJ, producer and rapper known as DJ Hurricane

== Other uses ==
- Anita Fite, a fictional character in DC Comics
- Fite, Republic of Dagestan, Russia
- Triller TV, formerly known as FITE TV, a video streaming service for ring sports live programming
- Henry Fite House, in Baltimore, Maryland, the meeting site of the Second Continental Congress
- Future Immersive Training Environment of the United States Department of Defense

== See also ==
- Fight (disambiguation)
