= Fight (disambiguation) =

A fight is a purposeful violent conflict of combat intended to establish dominance over the opposition.

Fight or fighting may also refer to:

== Sport ==
- Combat sport
- Fighting in ice hockey
- Martial arts
- Philadelphia Fight, an American rugby league team

== Arts, entertainment, and media ==
=== Film ===
- Fighting (2009 film), a 2009 action film directed by Dito Montiel
- Fighting (2014 film), a 2014 Chinese action-romance film directed by Yu Junhao

=== Music ===
==== Groups ====
- Fight (band), a band assembled by Judas Priest frontman, Rob Halford

==== Albums ====
- Fight (Doro album), 2002
- Fight (Flipper album), 2009
- Fight (Mayumi Iizuka album), 2009
- Fight (Kanjani Eight album), 2011
- Fighting (Tank album), 2006
- Fighting (Thin Lizzy album), 1975
- Fight (EP), a 2013 EP by Sister Sparrow & the Dirty Birds
- Fighting, working title of the 1981 Adam and the Ants album Prince Charming

==== Songs ====
- "Fight" (Natalia Barbu song), a Eurovision song by Natalia Barbu
- "Fight", a song by Amberian Dawn from Circus Black
- "Fight", a song by Brockhampton from Saturation II
- "Fight", a song by Gotthard from Firebirth
- "Fight," a song by Lee DeWyze from Frames
- "Fight", a song by Metalium from Millennium Metal - Chapter One
- "Fight", a theme song and single by The Musketeers from the BBC TV series The Flashing Blade
- "Fight", a song by NEFFEX
- "Fight", a song by The Rolling Stones from Dirty Work
- "Fight", a song by Sons of Angels
- "Fight", a song by Warkings from Revolution
- "Fight (No Matter How Long)", a song by The Bunburys from 1988 Summer Olympics Album: One Moment in Time
- Fight song (disambiguation)
- "Fighting" (Tyler Joe Miller song)
- "Fighting" (Yellowcard song), from Paper Walls
- "Fighting" (BSS song)

=== Gaming ===
- Fighting game, a genre of video games

=== Books ===
- Fight: Inside the Wildest Battle for the White House, a 2025 nonfiction book by Jonathan Allen and Amie Parnes

== Other ==
- Waist clothes or fights, colored clothes or sheets hung around the outside of a ship's upper works
- Assault and battery

== See also ==
- Affray
- Dogfight (disambiguation)
- Fight Club (disambiguation)
- Fighter (disambiguation)
- Fite (disambiguation)
- Infighting (disambiguation)
- Paiting, also known as fighting, a common expression used in the Korean language to rally or cheer someone
