= Liver shot =

Strike targeting the liver

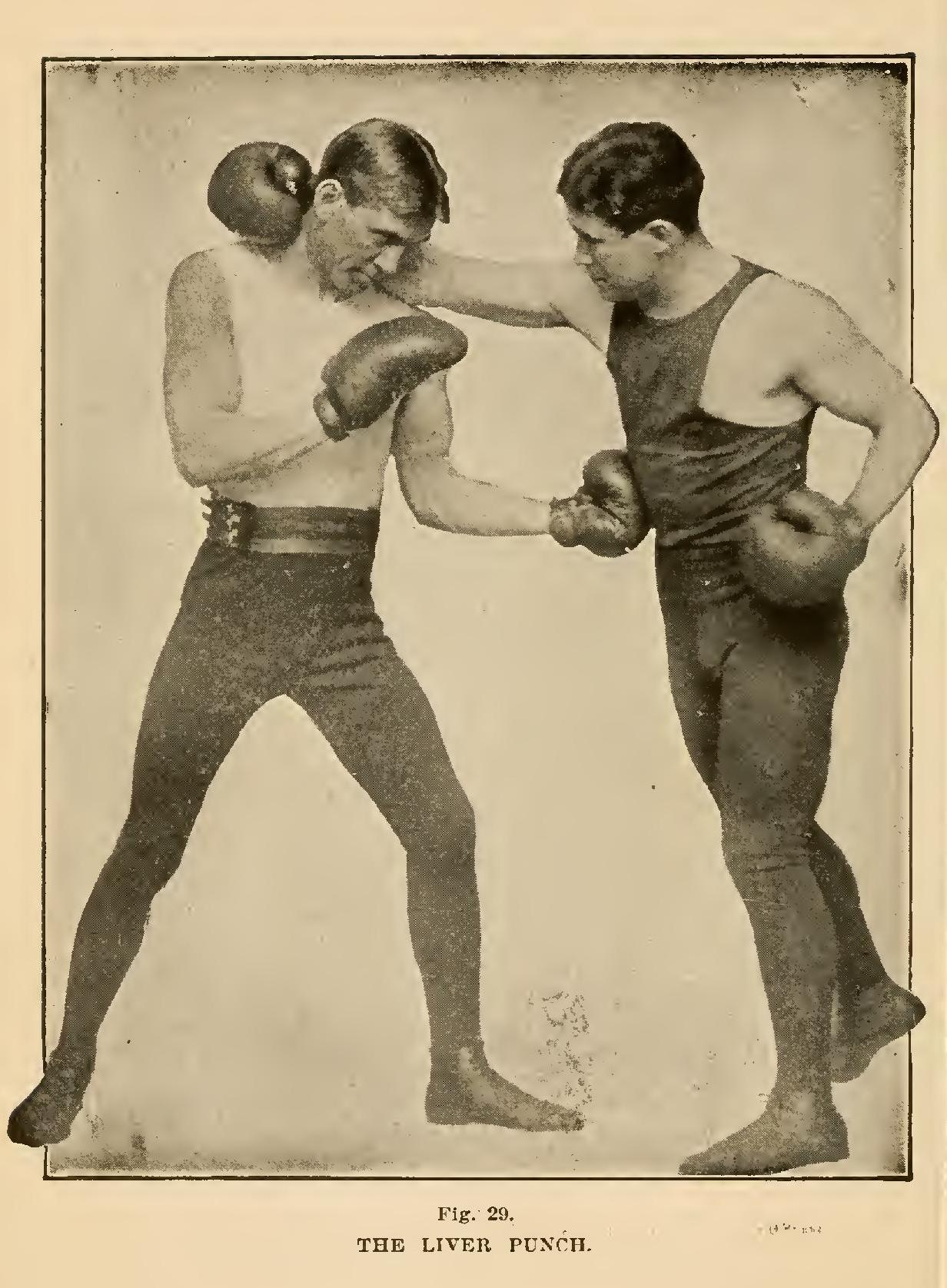
A left hook to the liver

A liver shot or liver punch is a punch, kick, or knee strike to the right side of the ribcage that damages the liver. Blunt force to the liver can be excruciatingly painful, but mostly lasts only about 30 seconds to one minute. An especially effective shot will incapacitate a person instantly. Thus, in combat sports, liver shots often result in technical knockouts (TKOs).

Because in humans the liver is located in the right upper quadrant of the abdomen, below the diaphragm, a liver punch is usually made with the left hand, or the left hook in infighting, or the regular short body hook, in a short and quick manner. The drive is usually made under and to the front of the ninth and tenth ribs upward to the base of the shoulder blade toward the spine. The punch shocks the liver, the largest gland organ, and a center of blood circulation, and causes the victim to lose focus and drive, and can cause a breathless feeling in the victim. It is usually delivered when feinting an opponent to lead with his left, which leaves the body exposed; the attacker then steps in and delivers a short, stiff uppercut, over the liver, which will likely leave the average boxer incapacitated. Most of the time, however, a liver punch is unintentional. It begins as a right hook to the body, but as the defending boxer puts his elbow down and begins to roll with the punch, the back is exposed. Thus, the attacking boxer is frequently offered either the arm or the back of the ribs, the latter of which he will usually take instead.

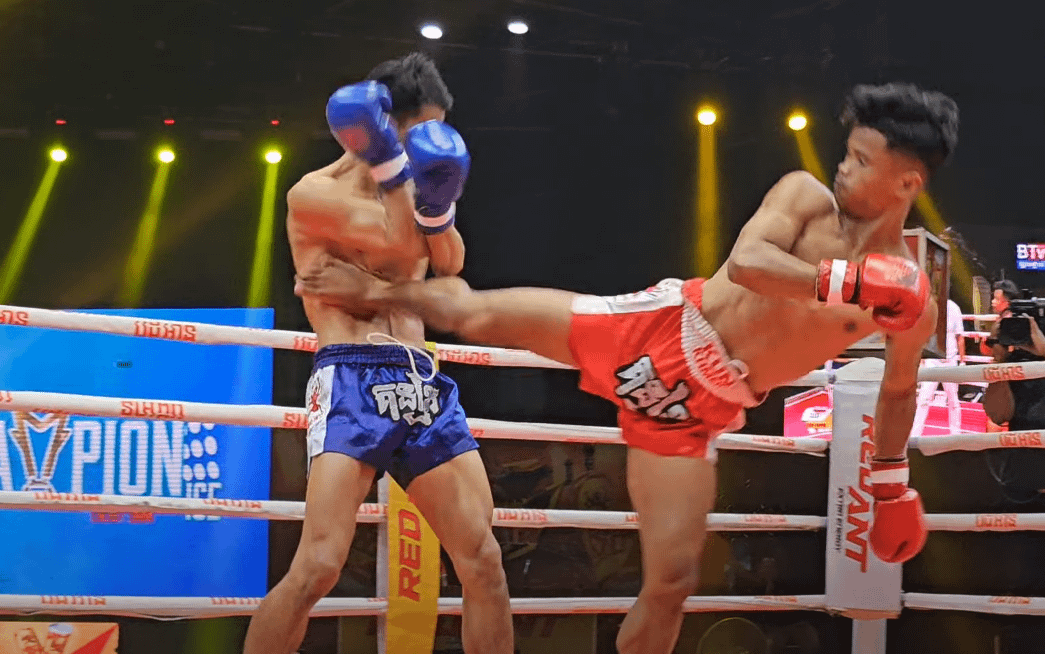
Kun Khmer liver shot back kick

Front kicks, side kicks and spinning back kicks, which are commonly associated with Chinese Martial arts, karate and taekwondo, can also target the liver to great effect.
