= T24 Festival =

2012 tent-pitching event in South Korea

The T24 Festival, also known as the T24 Social Festival, was an event on September 8, 2012, in the Yangcheon District of Seoul, South Korea, during which former soldier Lee Kwang-nak (Note: In this Korean name, the family name is Lee.) was challenged to set up a 24-person military tent single-handedly in under two hours. The demonstrative event was organized by Lee after he had stated online on August 30, 2012, that he could do it alone, thus provoking disbelief from others; customarily, such a tent is erected as a team effort, usually by eight soldiers or more, rarely fewer.

Specifically taking place at Shinwon Elementary School, the T24 Festival drew over 2,000 people and involved corporate sponsorships, widespread media coverage and online attention, and high-profile attendees including the singer Lexy.

== Background ==
On August 30, 2012, users on a South Korean internet forum dedicated to cameras, called SLR Club, discussed the 24-person military tents used by the South Korean military. Setting up such a tent in a group has been a standard practice for those conscripted; customarily, eight people are expected to be able to pitch the tent in 10 minutes.

Lee, who had the username "Lvl 7. Bug" online, stated in the online forum that he could pitch one of those tents by himself, without help, citing his eight years of having served; Lee was 29 at the time. Users then began to argue about the feasibility of Lee's statement, with some calling it impossible and others even questioning whether Lee served in the military at all.

Hours later, Lee outlined in writing how a person could set up a 24-person military tent alone and proposed a 500,000 won bet that he could do it. One of the SLR Club's users, a self-identified planner, helped Lee acquire a tent and set up the location for the event that would become the T24 Festival.

== Festival ==
The T24 Festival was scheduled for September 8, 2012, at Shinwon Elementary School in the Yangcheon District of Seoul. In the days leading up to it, both Lee's online argument and subsequent bet received viral traction. Lee also promoted the T24 Festival himself by creating promotional videos, posters, and other materials, and many companies stepped in to officially sponsor the event.

Ultimately, 2,000 people showed up to watch Lee set up the 24-person military tent. SLR Club members appeared and served as volunteers to facilitate the T24 Festival. A prize pool was amassed with dozens of products from corporate sponsorships; products included camera gear, coupons and vouchers, and even car engine oil. Nam Hee-suk promised one free hotel night at Busan's Paradise Hotel. Several media outlets came to report on and provide commentary for Lee's challenge, and the singer Lexy volunteered herself to perform in the event of Lee's success. Additionally, the festival was live-streamed online on Ustream, AfreecaTV, and other services. It drew over a million views and became a viral sensation on the internet, topping the rankings of several search engines in South Korea.

At 2:00 pm, Lee appeared and was introduced by a host. Briefly, Lee remarked that the outcome of the T24 Festival was unimportant and simply wanted everyone to have fun. Lee then began setting up the 24-person military tent at 3:09 pm. With some of the poles he established, attendees would cheer for him, and he would cheer "paiting" back; attendees would also shout "Bug," a nod to his username. At 3:50 pm, Lee took a break for 10 minutes, took pictures of himself, and even posted on the online forum where Lee's challenge originated from. Right before completing the tent's setup, Lee climbed atop it and performed various gestures of celebration. He ultimately completed the tent's setup at 4:34 pm, marking an hour and 29 minutes.

Afterward, Lee received a trophy enshrining his achievement of setting up the tent in under two hours, and attendees crowded around him for photo opportunities. Lee additionally received over 5 million won as well as other prizes including a plaque commemorating his feat.

== Aftermath ==
After Lee's success at the T24 Festival, Lee became an online sensation. The festival continued to top rankings on Korea's search engines, and many publications reported on his feat. South Korea's Ministry of National Defense tweeted that it was finally proven possible to pitch a 24-person military tent alone. The ministry also joked that they would consider conscripting Lee again, while netizens were jokingly concerned that single-handedly setting up tents would be a future expectation on soldiers.

One day after the T24 festival, Lee shared in interviews that he used to be an officer who taught soldiers how to pitch tents in the South Korean military, serving for eight years in total before being discharged at the rank of sergeant. In particular, he knew how to set up tents with less personnel due to how small his team was relative to others; however, he had never actually set up a 24-person military tent by himself prior to the T24 Festival, making the event a true bet.

Lee continued to court public attention following the T24 Festival. On September 12, Lee publicly criticized the KT Corporation after they failed to act on their promise of giving him a Samsung Galaxy S III; the company's lack of contact toward Lee provoked outcry online. The same day, Lee posted online that he was interested in joining the Seoul Broadcasting System's survival reality television show Law of the Jungle; the post garnered over ten thousand views and many comments in support of Lee's self-nomination.

After the T24 Festival, journalists and critics discussed the event's significance. Some observed the rapid organizing and excitement for the event as proof of the connective power of the internet and its netizens. Others commented on Lee as truly representative of the principle of backing one's statements and lauded the T24 Festival as a pure, genuine display of sheer audacity. The Korea Times called it "perhaps one of the most unique events Seoul has seen" in 2012.
