= The Fight =

The Fight may refer to:

== Arts, entertainment, and media ==
=== Films ===
- The Fight (1915 film), a lost silent film social drama
- The Fight: Science Against Cancer, a 1950 Canadian documentary film
- The Fight (2018 film), a British family drama film
- The Fight (2020 film), an American documentary film

=== Television ===
- "The Fight" (Star Trek: Voyager), a 1999 episode
- "The Fight" (The Office), a 2005 episode
- "The Fight" (How I Met Your Mother), a 2008 episode
- "The Fight" (Parks and Recreation), a 2011 episode
- "The Fight" (The Amazing World of Gumball) a 2012 episode
- "The Fight" (Saving Hope), a 2012 episode

=== Literature ===
- The Fight (book), a 1975 non-fiction book by Norman Mailer
- "The Fight", 1822 essay by William Hazlitt; early discourse on "popular culture"

=== Music ===
- The Fight (band), a band from the UK
- "The Fight", a song by Avenged Sevenfold on the album Diamonds in the Rough
- "The Fight", a song by Sia on the album We Are Born

== Other uses ==
- The Fight: Lights Out, a 2010 PlayStation Move game
- Philadelphia Fight, an American rugby league team

== See also ==
- Fight (disambiguation)
