= Jet fighter (disambiguation) =

A jet fighter is a jet engine-powered military aircraft designed for air-to-air combat.

Jet fighter(s) or Jetfighter(s) may also refer to:

- Jet Fighter (video game) (1975), 2 player arcade game by Atari
- Jetfighter (series) (1988), 3D combat flight simulator computer games from Velocity Development

== See also ==
- Jet (disambiguation)
- Fighter (disambiguation)
- List of fighter aircraft
- Jet aircraft
