= Finnish Sauna (Virginia, Minnesota) =

- U.S. National Register of Historic Places
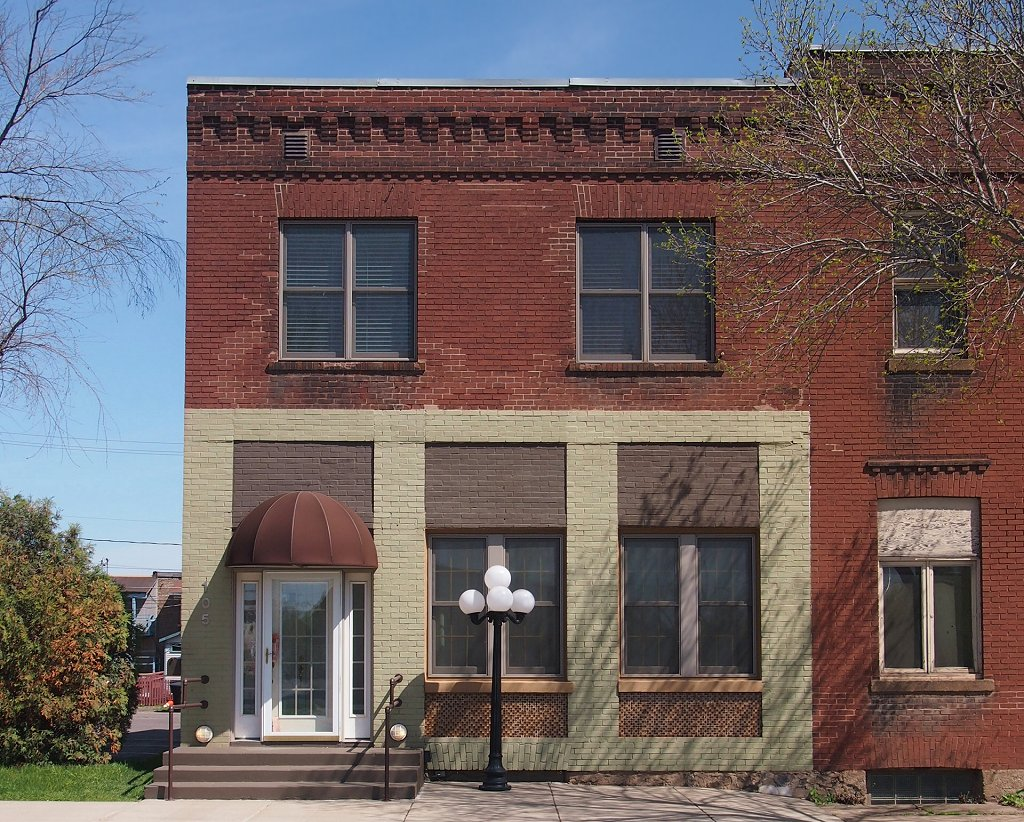
- The Finnish Sauna viewed from the south

- Location within Minnesota Location within the United States
- Location: 105 S. 1st Street, Virginia, Minnesota
- Coordinates: 47°31′21″N 92°31′53.9″W
- Area: Less than one acre
- Built: c. 1912
- NRHP reference No.: 80004360
- Added to NRHP: August 26, 1980

The Finnish Sauna is a former public bath in Virginia, Minnesota, United States. It opened around 1912 to cater to urban Finnish Americans who wished to maintain the Finnish sauna tradition. It was listed on the National Register of Historic Places in 1980 for its local significance in the themes of architecture and social history. It was nominated for representing the strong influence of Finnish American culture on the Iron Range, and the commercial services developed to perpetuate it.

== Description ==
The Finnish Sauna is a two-story brick building with a 25-by-100-foot (7.6 by 30.5 m) footprint. The primary façade contains an offset front door and four windows, two on each floor. The exterior brick is painted. The building has a flat roof that slopes to the rear.

== History ==
Virginia's Finnish Sauna opened around 1912. Finnish immigrants had flocked to Minnesota's Iron Range to take jobs in the local mines. Enterprising Finnish Americans opened commercial saunas in many Iron Range communities in response to ongoing interest in this aspect of Finnish culture among miners and their families with no access to private saunas. Commercial saunas were more than just a place to get clean. They served as social centers for Finnish Americans, much as other groups might socialize at a coffee shop, bar, or bowling alley.

Most of the Iron Range's commercial saunas closed as home saunas became more common in the 1950s. Virginia's sauna managed to stay in business longer, thanks to owners who valued its historical significance and a clientele of seniors on fixed incomes, migrant mine workers, and locals for whom it remained a social hangout. It was still in business in 1980 when its National Register documentation was prepared, but it has since closed.

== See also ==
- National Register of Historic Places listings in St. Louis County, Minnesota
