= Stiff upper lip =

Term; displaying fortitude in the face of adversity

A person who is said to have a stiff upper lip displays fortitude in the face of adversity, or exercises great self-restraint in the expression of emotion. The phrase is most commonly heard as part of the idiom "keep a stiff upper lip". It has traditionally been used to describe an attribute of British people in remaining resolute and unemotional when faced with adversity. A sign of fear is trembling of the upper lip, hence the saying keep a "stiff" upper lip.

== Examples ==
The following have often been cited as exemplifying the "stiff upper lip".

- During the Battle of Waterloo, the Earl of Uxbridge's calm assessment of his injuries (he had lost his leg) to the Duke of Wellington after being hit by a cannonball.
- Rudyard Kipling's poem If—, first published in 1910.
- During the sinking of HMS Birkenhead in 1852, soldiers famously stood in ranks on board, allowing the women and children to board the boats safely and escape the sinking.
- In 1912, during the Terra Nova Expedition, Captain Lawrence Oates, aware that his own ill health was compromising his three companions' chances of survival, calmly leaving the tent and choosing certain death saying, "I am just going outside and may be some time."
- In 1912, Captain Edward Smith directing the evacuation of the RMS Titanic before going down with the ship.
- Major Allison Digby Tatham-Warter, who would wear a bowler hat and carry an umbrella into battle in the Second World War, most famously at the battle for Arnhem Bridge.
- In 1982, Captain Moody aboard British Airways Flight 9 from London to Auckland, on realising that all four engines of the aircraft had failed, announced to the passengers, "We have a small problem. All four engines have stopped. We are doing our damnedest to get them going again. I trust you are not in too much distress." The pilots were eventually able to restart the engines and safely land the plane in Jakarta with no injuries among the occupants. It was later found that the engines had failed as a result of volcanic ash.
- In 1989, United Airlines Flight 232 suffered a catastrophic engine failure that rendered all hydraulics inoperable, resulting in the aircraft being virtually uncontrollable, with the exception of the engine throttles. Captain Al Haynes kept a healthy sense of self-deprecating humour throughout the ordeal, which could clearly be heard on the cockpit voice recorder. The crew, along with passengers who were off-duty pilots and flight engineers, managed to crash land the aircraft at Sioux Gateway Airport in Iowa. In simulation scenarios, no crew has ever been able to make it to the airport, and the event is often cited as one of the best examples of crew resource management in an emergency situation.
- Wodehouse's ninth Jeeves novel uses the expression in the title "Stiff Upper Lip, Jeeves".

== Origins ==
The concept reached England in the 1590s, and featured in the plays of William Shakespeare. His tragic hero Hamlet says, "There is nothing either good or bad but thinking makes it so".

The phrase became symbolic of the British people, and particularly of those who were students of the English public school system during the Victorian era, and aimed to instil a code of discipline and devotion to duty in their pupils through 'character-building' competitive sports (as immortalised in the poem "Vitaï Lampada"), corporal punishments and cold showers.

== See also ==
- Always Look on the Bright Side of Life – 1979 song from Monty Python's Life of Brian about stoicism
- Coping (psychology) – Strategies used to reduce unpleasant emotions
- Gaman (term) – Japanese term of Zen Buddhist origin - "enduring the seemingly unbearable with patience and dignity"
- Ganbaru – Japanese phrase for perseverance
- Keep Calm and Carry On – Motivational poster produced by the British government in 1939
- Minimisation (psychology) - an action where an individual intentionally downplays a situation
- Psychological resilience – Ability to mentally cope with a crisis
- Sabr – Patience as part of Islamic faith
- Sisu – Finnish concept of stoic determination & tenacity of purpose
- Social sharing of emotions – Psychological phenomenon
- Stoicism – Ancient philosophy emphasising daily self-discipline and moral improvement
- Sumud – Palestinian cultural value akin to stoicism
- Trooper - 'The sense of “one who endures adversity”
