= Add oil =

Hong Kong English expression

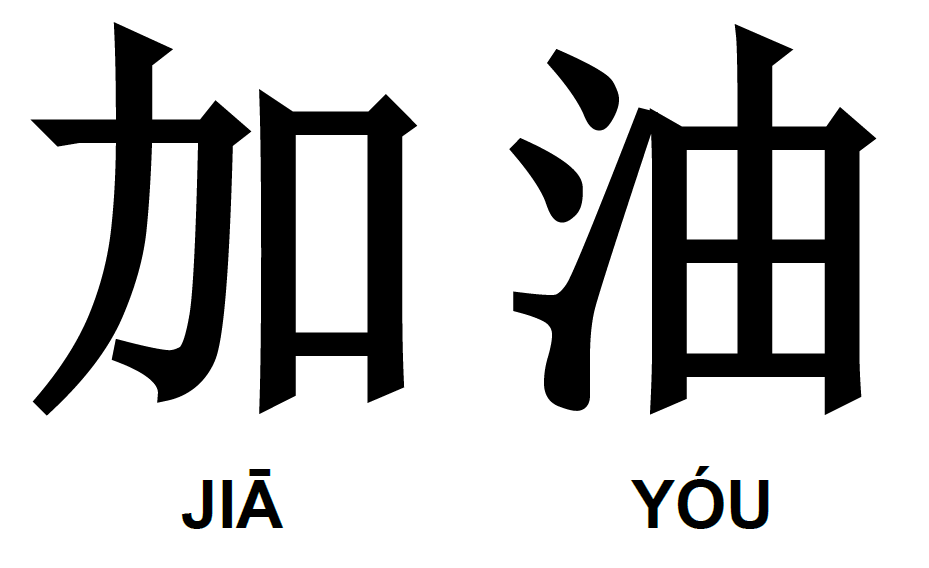
- The Chinese characters (加油) for Jiayou along with the Mandarin pinyin (jiā yóu).
- Chinese: 加油
- Literal meaning: Add oil
Transcriptions
Standard Mandarin
- Hanyu Pinyin: jiā yóu
- Bopomofo: ㄐㄧㄚ ㄧㄡˊ
- Gwoyeu Romatzyh: jia iou
- Wade–Giles: chia yu^{2}
- Tongyong Pinyin: jia yóu
- IPA: [tɕjá jǒʊ]
Wu
- Wugniu: ka^{1} yeu^{2}
- IPA: Shanghainese: [ka˦ ɦiɤ˨˧]
Yue: Cantonese
- Yale Romanization: gāyáu
- Jyutping: gaa^{1} jau^{2}
- IPA: [ka˥ jɐw˩]
Southern Min
- Hokkien POJ: ka-iû
- Tâi-lô: ka-iû

"Add oil" is a Hong Kong English expression used as an encouragement and support to a person. Derived from the Chinese phrase Gayau (or Jiayou; Chinese: 加油), the expression is literally translated from the Cantonese phrase. It is originated in Hong Kong and is commonly used by bilingual Hong Kong speakers.

"Add oil" can be roughly translated as "Go for it". Though it is often described as "the hardest to translate well", the literal translation is the result of Chinglish and was added to the Oxford English Dictionary in 2018. The phrase is commonly used at sporting events and competitions by groups as a rallying cheer and can also be used at a personal level as a motivating phrase to the partner in the conversation.

It is commonly believed that the term originated from first being used at the Macau Grand Prix during the 1960s, possibly from contact with the Portuguese expression «dá-lhe gás», a common cheer by supporters urging the driver to "put more oil into it/step on the gas" during the racing competition to encourage them to speed/accelerate faster.

== Etymology and history ==
In Cantonese, gā (加) means "add", and yáu (油) means "oil" or "fuel". It is cited that the Cantonese term originated as a cheer at the Macau Grand Prix during the 1960s. It was used to imply stepping harder on the gas pedal, giving the car more speed and power to accelerate. It is also a metaphor of injecting fuel into a tank. It was then used as an "all purpose cheer", and used exclusively in both Mandarin Chinese and Cantonese Chinese.

The romanized Cantonese ga yau and literal translation phrase add oil was commonly used since then due to the large number of bilingual Hongkongers. Instead of using the romanised Cantonese, it is reported that the English phrase was used more commonly by young Hongkongers. The increasing use of text-based online communications also contributed to the usage of the English expression.

In October 2018, due to its popularity among English speakers, "Add oil!" was officially added to the online edition of the Oxford English Dictionary. The entry recognises it as Hong Kong English, and verified that the usage of the phrase can be traced back to 1964.

== Usage ==
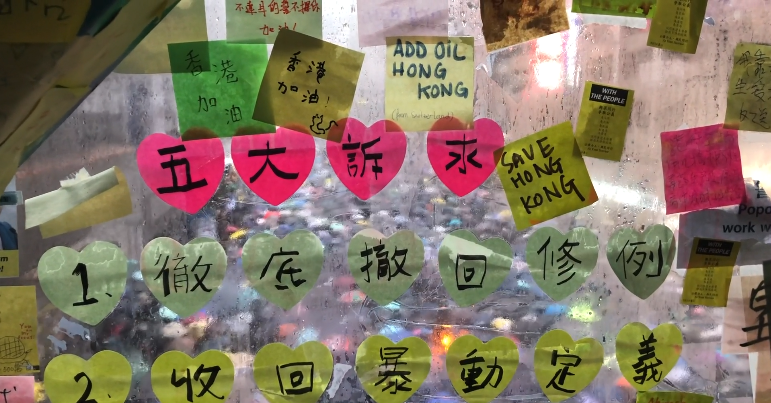
"Add oil Hong Kong" among other messages in support of the 2019–20 Hong Kong protests, in both English and Cantonese on Lennon Walls.

The term is popularly used for colloquial conversations in Chinese due to its linguistic flexibility in being utilizable in various situations and has been described as an "all purpose cheer." In circumstances of encouragement, it can be translated as "Good Luck!", "Go for it!", "You can do it!", "Don't give up!". As a rallying cry during public events such as a sports competition, it can mean "Go team go!" or "Let's go!" While the term can be used as an admonishment, where in an example of "Look at those grades, you should jiāyóu!" would mean to "Put more effort into it!", it can also be used as an expression of solidarity with friends, in those situations to mean "I’m behind you" and "I’m rooting for you!"

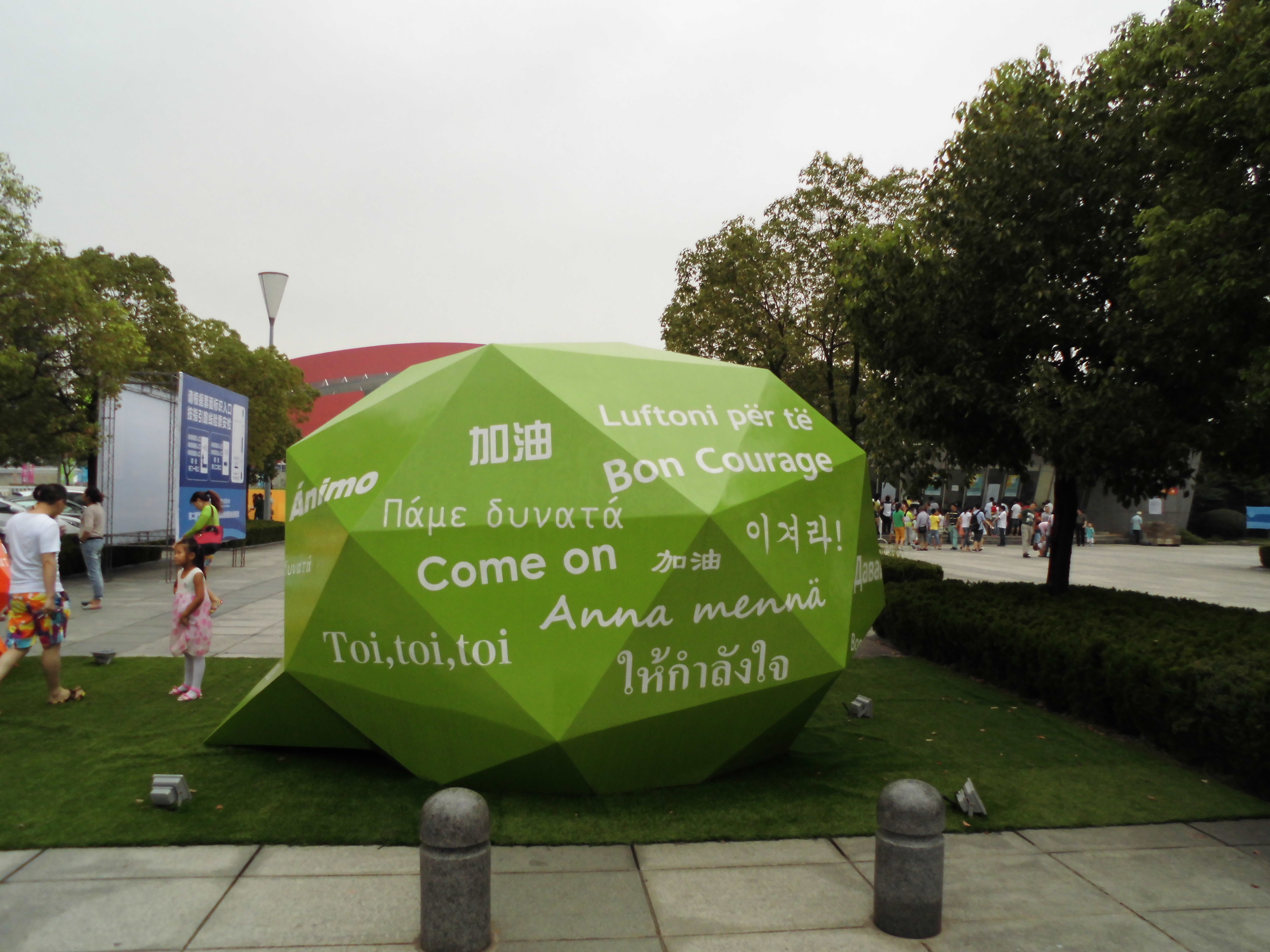
Jiayou! (加油) on an art installation (centre) in Beijing alongside phrases of similar meaning in other languages

The phrase is a versatile expression typically used in encouraging and supporting speeches. For example, "Add oil, you can do it!". It is also commonly used during sports matches, to encourage athletes to perform well.

The phrase "Wenchuan jiayou!" was widely used online and in Chinese media as an expression of sympathy and solidarity during the 2008 Sichuan Earthquake particularly for the county of Wenchuan, the epicentre of the earthquake and the most severely impacted area.

At the 2008 Beijing Olympic Games, the Chinese Olympics Team adopted the phrase as its official cheer, which went along with its own corresponding routine of claps.

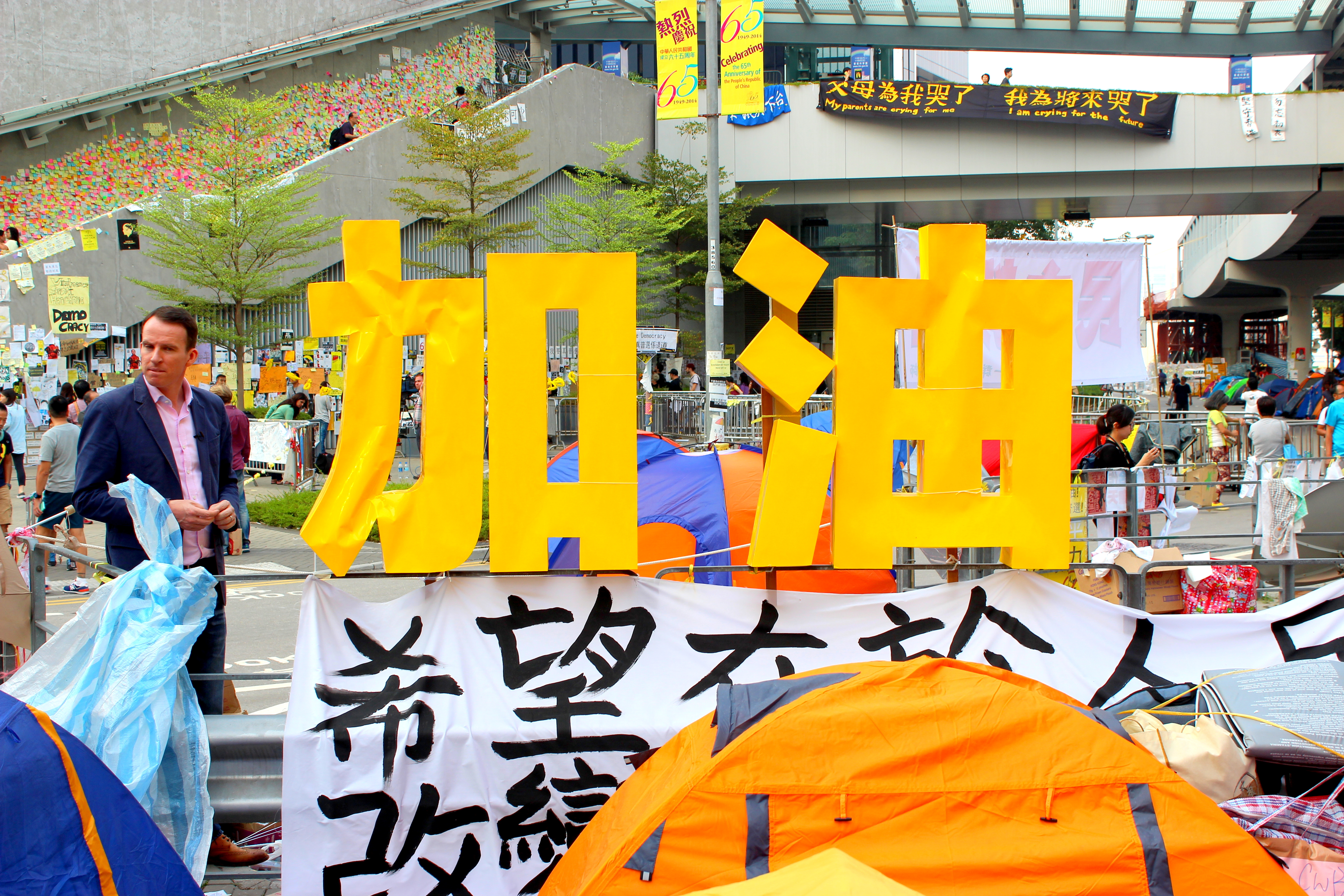
The Chinese word of "Ga yau" during the Umbrella Movement in Central, Hong Kong.

The term was used as a "rallying cry" and phrase for support during the 2014 Umbrella Movement and the 2019–20 Hong Kong protests. It also became a popular tattoo for protesters; with a certain design the Cantonese text for the phrase, when read sideways, appears to be the Chinese text saying 'Hong Kong'. Local artists set up the "add oil machine", a wall along Gloucester Road. It was used to encourage international supporters to put down supporting messages to the protesters.

The term was also used extensively during the Hong Kong protests in 2019–20.

During the COVID-19 pandemic that broke out first in the city of Wuhan in Hubei province, the phrase "Wuhan jiayou!" was a common expression of solidarity throughout social and news media but also in public with the city which went under lockdown. Videos soon surfaced online on January 23 of Wuhan residents chanting the phrase, roughly translatable to "Stay strong, Wuhan!" or "Keep on going, Wuhan!", through of their windows to neighbours with many joining in to the chorus to echo across the high-rise buildings of the city.

The phrase was also used to express international solidarity with Wuhan. Relief boxes of face masks sent to Wuhan because of a shortage by its sister-city of Oita in Japan were labelled with "Wuhan jiayou!" On February 2, the UAE declared "We support Wuhan, and the Chinese communities around the world" and projected the phrase "Wuhan jiayou!" onto the Burj Khalifa in Dubai as a message of solidarity.

The phrase gained attention in 2021 when Saturday Night Live alumni Bowen Yang used it in his Weekend Update segment to react to the recent surge in anti-Asian hate crimes in America. The comedian told audiences to "fuel up" (his translation of the cheer) and do more for Asian Americans.

== Related terms ==
Elsewhere in East Asia, terms used similarly to add oil are the Japanese Ganbatte! (頑張って) and Korean Paiting! (Korean: 파이팅).
