= Fighter =

Fighter(s) or The Fighter(s) may refer to:

== Combat and warfare ==
- Combatant, a person entitled to directly participate in hostilities during an armed conflict
- Fighter aircraft, a military aircraft designed primarily for air-to-air combat
  - Fighter pilot, a military aviator who pilots a fighter aircraft
- Martial artist, a person who practices martial arts
- Soldier, a person who is member of an army
- Warrior, a person specializing in combat or warfare

== Film and television ==
- The Fighter (1921 film), an American silent film directed by Henry Kolker
- The Fighters (1939 film), a Soviet drama film directed by Eduard Pentslin
- The Fighter (1952 film), an American film noir boxing film directed by Herbert Kline
- The Fighters (1974 film), a documentary film directed by Rick Baxter and William Greaves
- The Fighter (1983 film), a television movie starring Gregory Harrison and Glynnis O'Connor
- Fighter, a 1995 unrealized Indian film by Sanjay Gupta, starting Akshaye Khanna
- Fighter (2000 film), an American documentary about two holocaust survivors
- Fighter (2007 film) or Fightgirl Ayse, a Danish film directed by Natasha Arthy
- The Fighter, a 2010 American biographical sports film directed by David O. Russell
- Fighter (2012 film), an Indian Bengali-language film directed by Rabi Kinagi
- War (2019 film), an Indian film with the working title Fighters
- Fighter (2023 film), an Indian Kannada-language film
- Fighter (2024 film), an Indian Hindi-language film directed by Siddharth Anand
- Bruce Lee: The Fighter, a 2015 Indian Telugu-language film by Sreenu Vaitla
- "The Fighters", an episode of Bonanza

== Games and sports ==
- Fighter (character class), a common archetypal character class in numerous role-playing games
  - Fighter (Dungeons & Dragons), a class in Dungeons & Dragons
- Fighter kite, a type of kite used for the sport of kite fighting
- Hokkaido Nippon-Ham Fighters, a Japanese professional baseball team

== Literature ==
- The Fighter, a 1909 novel by Albert Payson Terhune
- Fighter: The True Story of the Battle of Britain, a 1977 book by Len Deighton
- "Fighter", a short story from the 2000 collection 145th Street: Short Stories by Walter Dean Myers
- The Fighter: Essays a 2007 book by Tim Parks
- The Fighter, a 2008 novel by Craig Davidson
- The Fighter, a 2016 book by Arnold Zable

== Music ==
- The Fighters (band), a 1990s American punk rock band
- Fighters, nickname for fans of Christina Aguilera

=== Albums ===
- Fighter (David Nail album) or the title song, 2016
- Fighter (Manafest album) or the title song, 2012
- The Fighters (Chad Brownlee album) or the title song, 2014
- The Fighters (LoCash album) or the title song, 2016
- Bruce Lee: The Fighter (soundtrack), by S. Thaman for the 2015 Indian film

=== Songs ===
- "Fighter" (Christina Aguilera song), 2003
- "Fighter" (Namie Amuro song), 2016
- "Fighter" (Tali song), 2024
- "Fighters" (song), by Sandaime J Soul Brothers from Exile Tribe, 2011
- "The Fighter" (Gym Class Heroes song), 2011
- "The Fighter" (Keith Urban song), 2017
- "Fighter", by Bump of Chicken from Butterflies, 2016
- "Fighter", by Monsta X from The Clan Pt. 2 Guilty, 2016
- "Fighter", by Blue Stahli from Copper, 2020
- "Fighter", by Sneaker Pimps, 2021
- "Fighters", by Kris Allen from Thank You Camellia, 2012
- "The Fighter", by the Fray from Scars & Stories, 2012
- "The Fighter", by Paradise Fears, 2012
- "The Fighter", by In This Moment from Black Widow, 2014

== Other uses ==
- Fighter brand, a lower-priced offering intended to under-price competitors
- Mitsubishi Fuso Fighter, a series of medium to heavy duty trucks

== See also ==
- Bagaudae, groups of peasant insurgents in the Roman Empire whose name means "fighters" in Gaulish
- Fight (disambiguation)
- Senshi (disambiguation), Japanese for "soldier", "combatant", or "warrior"
