= Fight Song (disambiguation) =

Fight Song (or songs) or The Fight Song (or songs) may refer to:

- Fight song, at times team anthem, team song or games song, a song associated with a professional and amateur sports team
- "Fight Song" (Rachel Platten song), 2015
  - Fight Song (EP), Platten's 2015 extended play featuring the song
  - Fight Song (Rachel's Version), a 2025 Rachel Platten album
- Fight Songs (Old 97's album), 1999
- Fight Songs (Billy Bragg album), 2011
- Fight Songs (EP), a 1995 EP by The For Carnation
- "The Fight Song" (Marilyn Manson song), 2000
- "The Fight Song" (Sanctus Real song), 2004
- "The Fight Song" from A Temporary Dive by Ane Brun (2005)
- "The Fight Song" (Washington State University), the school's fight song

== See also ==
- Fight (disambiguation) § Songs – for songs with similar titles
