= Sisu =

Finnish concept

Sisu is a Finnish word variously translated as stoic determination, tenacity of purpose, grit, bravery, resilience, and hardiness. It is held by Finns to express their national character. It does not necessarily have a single-word literal equivalent in English, although tenacity, grit, resilience, and hardiness share similar meanings but do not necessarily imply stoicism or bravery.

In recent years, sociologists and psychologists have conducted research on sisu, attempting to quantify it and identify its effects, beneficial and harmful, in both individuals and populations.

== Meaning ==
Sisu is extraordinary determination in the face of extreme adversity, and courage that is presented typically in situations where success is unlikely. It expresses itself in taking action against the odds, and displaying courage and resoluteness in the face of adversity; in other words, deciding on a course of action, and then adhering to it even if repeated failures ensue. It is in some ways similar to equanimity, though sisu entails an element of stress management.

The English "gutsy" invokes a similar metaphor (one also found in other languages): the Finnish usage derives from sisus, translated as "interior", and as "entrails" or "guts". See also the colloquial phrase "intestinal fortitude". Another closely related English concept evokes the metaphor grit.

== As a psychological capacity ==
Sisu is a term which dates back hundreds of years. It is described as being integral to understanding Finnish culture. It is a term for going beyond one's mental or physical capacity, and is a central part of the country's culture and collective discourse. However, hardly any empirical research has been done to explore the meaning of this construct as a possible psychological strength resource, and it has long been difficult to precisely define in psychological or sociological terms. It has usually been studied as a cultural component among Finns and Finnish Americans, but as a psychological construct long remained under-researched and poorly defined.

According to folklore researcher Matti Kuusi, the concept of "Finnish sisu" was born in 1912 at the Summer Olympics in Stockholm; in his 1989 non-fiction book Möykkyjä ja neulasia, Kuusi describes: "At that special moment, when Hannes Kolehmainen passed Frenchman Jean Bouin with a smile on the final stretch of the 5,000-meter race, it felt like a new element had been discovered: a Finnish force of nature that had no name but existed." In Finnish literature, "Finnish sisu" is first mentioned in the 1917 novel Kerran kesällä by Joel Lehtonen.

As early as the 1940s, attempts were made to grasp the essence of sisu. The Finnish newspaper Uusi Suomi reached out to its audience for their definition of sisu, and conducted a contest. Uusi-Suomi wrote: "All of us somewhat know what sisu is... [it] has for long been a topic for discussion here in Finland and abroad. But how do we describe and define what sisu really is?" The quest to define the essence of sisu has evidently been around for almost a century. More recently, William R. Aho, professor emeritus of sociology at Rhodes College, said "we need a good deal of organized, systematic scientific research to discover the scope and depth of sisu, geographically and situationally, and the depth and strength of both the beliefs and behaviors surrounding and emanating from sisu."

Research that began in 2013 sought to offer more precise language for discussing the term. While examining sisu within the psychological framework, it sought to render it less elusive as a construct by giving it an easily citable definition rooted within the field of positive psychology. Sisu as a psychological power potential was introduced for the first time at the 3rd World Congress on Positive Psychology in Los Angeles on 29 June 2013. In the study, sisu is described as a psychological key competence which enables extraordinary action to overcome a mentally or physically challenging situation. Sisu also contributes to what has been named the action mindset: a consistent, courageous approach toward challenges which at first seem to exceed our capacities. Sisu, as measured by the Sisu Scale questionnaire, has been established in contemporary psychological research as a strong correlate with well-being and stress. The Sisu Scale is composed of harmful and beneficial sisu.

A related online survey conducted between March and May 2013 tracked the cultural representations of sisu among contemporary Finns and Finnish Americans. It revealed that sisu is still deeply valued, and that there is public interest for cultivating this strength capacity as well. The study received over 1,000 responses; its data was the basis for thematic analysis. Among the main findings was the perception of sisu as a reserve of power which enables extraordinary action to overcome mentally or physically challenging situations, rather than being the ability to pursue long-term goals and be persistent.

Sisu is a psychological potential that enables the individual to tap into strength beyond their pre-conceived resources. Wielding sisu in the face of adversity helps individuals push through what first seemed like the boundaries of their mental or physical capacities. Sisu provides the final empowering push when we would otherwise hesitate to act. Sisu can be conceptualized as taking action against the odds. Even though 53% of the respondents believed some people innately have more sisu, 83% of the respondents believed that sisu is a flexible quality that can be cultivated through conscious practice, rather than being a fixed quality, and the majority of respondents were interested in developing this capacity. Research on sisu is currently continuing at Aalto University School of Science in Espoo, Finland.

Sisu is not always an entirely positive quality. In Finnish, pahansisuinen, literally translated, means one possessing bad sisu, a description of a hostile and malignant person. The answers from the sisu survey indicate that there can be too much sisu, and according to the survey answers this leads to bull-headedness, foolhardiness, self-centeredness, and inflexible thinking. The study suggests that sisu should be informed by reason and cultivated and practiced with self-compassion.

Like any trait or psychological capacity, sisu is the complex product of genetic, psychological, biological, and social factors, and its comprehensive understanding will require studies from multiple scientific perspectives. Finland may have the initial monopoly on sisu as a cultural construct, but it is a universal capacity and the potential for it exists within all individuals.

The power of narrative is acknowledged. People develop their values and contribute to cultural values by communicating with other people in their culture. Fostering sisu may be embedded in such behavior, rather than being a genetic trait one is born with. Sisu is a new term in the field of psychology, and it may contribute to our understanding of the determinants of resilience, as well as of achievement and the good life. It is suggested that positive psychology research could benefit from focusing on sisu and by examining relevant constructs from other cultures.

== Cultural significance ==
Sisu has been described as "the word that explains Finland", and the Finns' "favorite word"—"the most wonderful of all their words." As defined by Roman Schatz in his book From Finland with Love (2005), sisu is an ability to finish a task successfully. During the Winter War of 1939–1940, the Finnish perseverance in the face of the invasion by the Soviet Union popularized this word in English for a generation. In what may have been the first use of sisu in the English language, on 8 January 1940, Time magazine reported:

The Finns have something they call sisu. It is a compound of bravado and bravery, of ferocity and tenacity, of the ability to keep fighting after most people would have quit, and to fight with the will to win. The Finns translate sisu as "the Finnish spirit" but it is a much more gutful word than that. Last week the Finns gave the world a good example of sisu by carrying the war into Russian territory on one front while on another they withstood merciless attacks by a reinforced Russian Army. In the wilderness that forms most of the Russo-Finnish frontier between Lake Laatokka and the Arctic Ocean, the Finns definitely gained the upper hand.

— Time magazine, January 8, 1940

In 2009, sisu was described as so essential to the Finnish national character that "to be a real Finn" you must have it: "willpower, tenacity, persistency."

=== Examples ===
Singled out for kudos for this attribute was "Finland's wiry old peasant President, Kyösti Kallio—full of sisu..." The word was also used to describe the Finnish stubbornness in sticking to its loose alliance with Nazi Germany from 1941 to 1944 in the war against the Soviet Union, which had previously attacked Finland in November of 1939:

Finnish sisu—meaning a peculiarly Finnish brand of doggedness, capable of facing down death itself—was at work against the Allies.... The Finns are not happy. But sisu enables them to say: "We have nothing worse than death to fear."

— Time magazine, May 10, 1943.

During the 1952 Summer Olympics, sisu was further described in the context of the continuing Cold War looming over the Finnish capital city of Helsinki:

HELSINKI, host to the Olympic Games, a city of 400,000, was abustle. ... The Finns are not stupidly hiding their eyes from their future, but they are determined not to fall into another fight with a powerful and predatory next-door neighbor 66 times their size (in area, Finland is the sixth largest country in Europe; in population it is the third smallest). Under popular, 81-year-old President Juho Kusti Paasikivi and able, unpopular Agrarian Premier Urho Kekkonen, the Finns have learned to walk the nerve-racking path of independence like tight-rope walkers.

— Time magazine, July 21, 1952

Well into the 1960s, sisu was used to describe the Finnish resistance to the invasion of 20 to 30 years prior and its continuing discontents. In 1960, Austin Goodrich's book, Study in Sisu: Finland's Fight for Independence, was published by Ballantine. Also in 1960, a notable reviewer of Griffin Taylor's novel, Mortlake, wrote:

"Have you heard of Finnish sisu?" asks a character in "Mortlake"—and it turns out that sisu is a sort of stamina or staying-power which the Finns have had to develop as a result of living next door to the Russians.

— Nigel Dennis, New York Times Book Review

In 2004, Jorma Ollila, CEO of Nokia, described his company's "guts" by using the word sisu:

In times like these, the executives who run Nokia talk up a uniquely Finnish quality called sisu. "The translation would be 'guts,'" says Jorma Ollila, CEO of Nokia, in an interview. (Photograph Caption: Jorma Ollila says Nokia is determined to 'overcome all obstacles.') "But it's also endurance. There is a long-term element to it. You overcome all obstacles. You need quite a lot of sisu to survive in this climate." The climate he's referring to is the bleak and bitter Nordic winters, but he might as well be talking about the competitive, erratic wireless-phone market and Nokia's travails. This sisu trait—anathema to Wall Street's short-term outlook—says a lot about Nokia's response to its recent turmoil.

— Kevin Maney

A Finnish heavy metal rock singer injured himself, without noticing, at a concert, to which a reviewer wrote:

Alan epäillä, että suomalainen sisu ja adrenaliini ovat yksi ja sama asia.—I am beginning to suspect that the Finnish sisu and adrenaline are the same thing.

— ImperiumI.net Finnish Heavy Metal website

The concept is widely known in the Upper Peninsula of Michigan, which is home to a large concentration of Finnish Americans. This has extended to include a popular bumper sticker saying "got sisu?" or simply "SISU". In 2010, a 63-year-old Yooper named Joe Paquette Jr. of Munising, Michigan, walked 425 miles to the Detroit Lions training facility to bring the spirit of sisu to the team.

Sisu is believed to be part of the etymology of the sport of Guts Frisbee that originated in Michigan's Copper Country in 1958.

The non-profit documentary SISU: Family, Love and Perseverance from Finland to America was made by Finnish-American filmmaker Marko Albrecht. The documentary looks at sisu by means of a profile of his late mother, his Finnish-American family, and his uncle Heikki's fight against pancreatic cancer. The film was called a time-capsule of modern Finnish-American life.

In a 2008 episode of Top Gear, F1 racer Mika Häkkinen described sisu to James May:

Sisu in English means courage, it is the Finnish courage. Let me give you an example. Climbing a tree and jumping down from there, that doesn't mean sisu. That is not courage. Sisu we can relate very much that in motor racing, for example, you're driving a rally car in a forest extremely, really fast, you need courage to be able to brake late, to go on the throttle really early, to go really close to the apex of the corners.

The platinum trophy of the Finnish-made video game Alan Wake 2, given to players who earn every other trophy in the game, is called Sisu.

In the Epic Rap Battles of History battle "Red Baron vs. White Death," the White Death has the line "my name stands for sisu."

== As a proper name ==
Sisu KB-112 antique truck

Due to its cultural significance, sisu is a common element of brand names in Finland. For example, there is Sisu Auto trucks, Sisu armored vehicles, the icebreaker Sisu (and its scrapped 1938 counterpart), a brand of strong-tasting pastilles manufactured by Leaf, and Suomen Sisu, a Finnish nationalist organisation.

Sisu is also a male name with increasing popularity. More than 2,000 Finnish men have this name, most of them being born after 2010. The son of The Dudesons's Jukka Hilden is called Sisu. Since 2015, Sisu has appeared in the Finnish name day calendar on February 28, which is also known in Finland as Kalevala Day.

Globally, there were several fitness-related organizations and endurance sports teams such as the Sisu Project based in Haverhill and Worcester, Massachusetts, US, that carried the name sisu and based their philosophy on the characteristics included in the concept sisu, including courage, integrity, honesty, and determination.

Mount Sisu is the name of a mountain in the Antarctic first ascended by mountain climbers Veikka Gustafsson and Patrick Degerman.

Sisu is also the name of a London-based hedge-fund, operated by several directors including Joy Seppala. The firm bought the football club Coventry City FC in 2007.

In Norway there is a seafood company named Sisu Seafood Norway AS that exports Norwegian seafoods.

On the Western end of Michigan's Upper Peninsula, the SISU Ski Fest is a popular annual event, highlighting a 21- and 42-kilometer cross-country ski race "finishing" in historic downtown Ironwood.

=== In popular culture ===
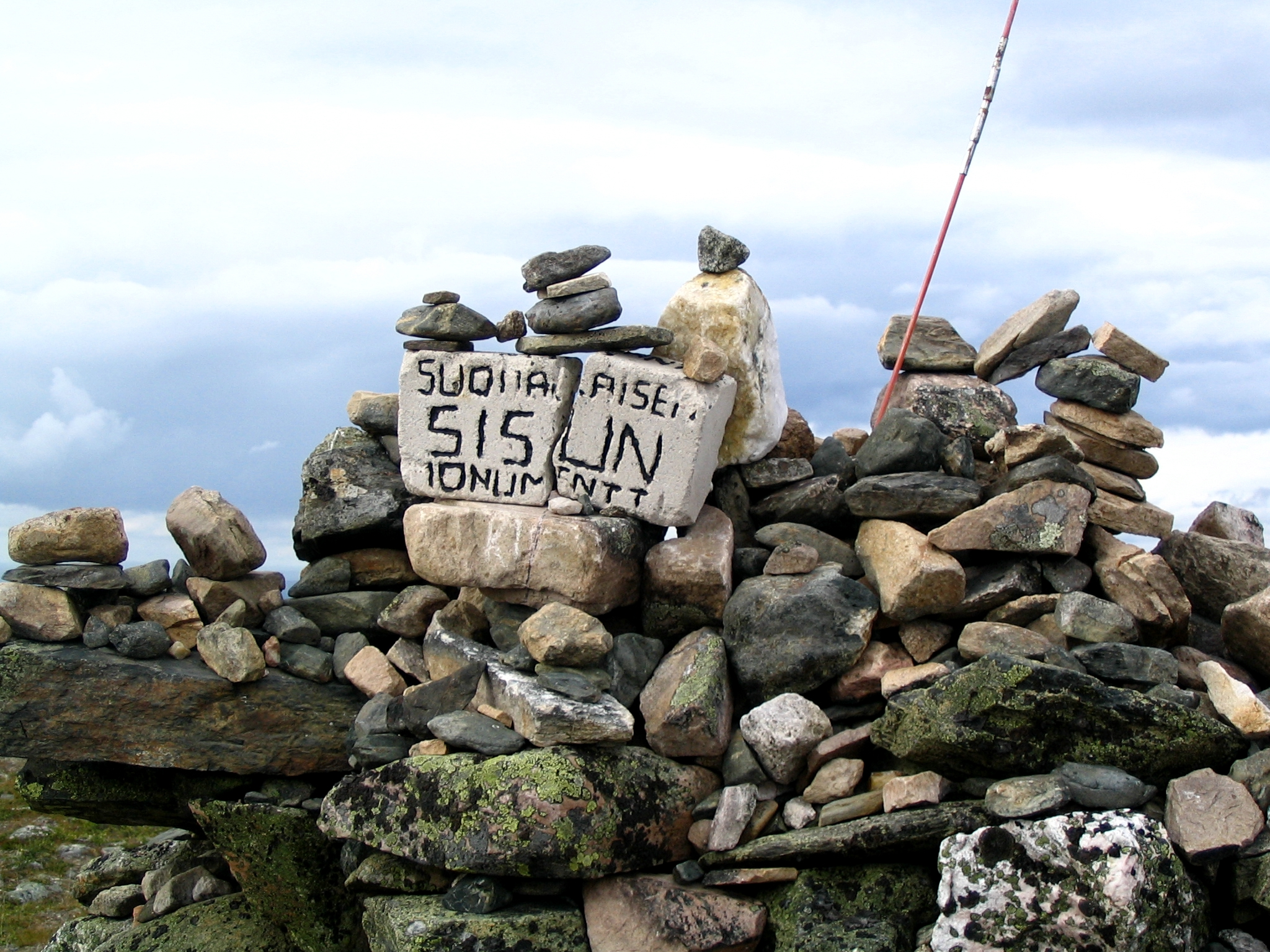
"Monument to the Finnish sisu" on a fell in Lapland

In season two of McLaren's animated program Tooned, Sisu is a planet and the true origin of two-time Formula One Drivers' Champion Mika Häkkinen (and possibly 2007 Drivers' Champion Kimi Räikkönen as well, based on a Sisu scene near the end of the episode in question). Häkkinen and Räikkönen are both Finnish and have driven for McLaren; Häkkinen won both of his titles with the team while Räikkönen won his after leaving McLaren for Ferrari.

A starship with a crew of partly Finnish descent in Robert A. Heinlein's 1957 science fiction novel Citizen of the Galaxy is named Sisu.

A World War II movie titled Sisu, directed by Jalmari Helander and starring Jorma Tommila, was released in April 2023. The film's sequel, Sisu: Road to Revenge, was released in October 2025.

Professional wrestler Lexa Valo uses the in-ring nickname "The Queen of Sisu".

== See also ==
- Chutzpah, an Ashkenazi Jewish word for audacity
- Cojones, Spanish term used for "having what it takes" (also used and spelled as "Colhões" in Portugal)
- Drive theory; analyses, classifies and defines psychological drives
- Gaman, and Ganbaru, Japanese words with a similar meaning
- Grit, a similar concept in English
- Intention (criminal law)
- Pefletti, a small bench towel used in a Finnish sauna, to better bear the heat
- Psychological resilience
- Seny, the Catalan concept of good sense
- Sisunautti, Finnish word combining 'sisu' with 'astronaut'
- Stiff upper lip, British expression for fortitude and stoicism
- Sumud, a Palestinian Arabic word with a similar meaning
- Vīrya, Buddhist attitude of gladly engaging in wholesome activities
