= Finnish sauna =

Type of bathhouse

Sauna culture in Finland Finnish: saunakulttuuri Suomessa Swedish: bastukultur i Finland Northern Sami: sávdnjekultuvra Suomas
- UNESCO Intangible Cultural Heritage
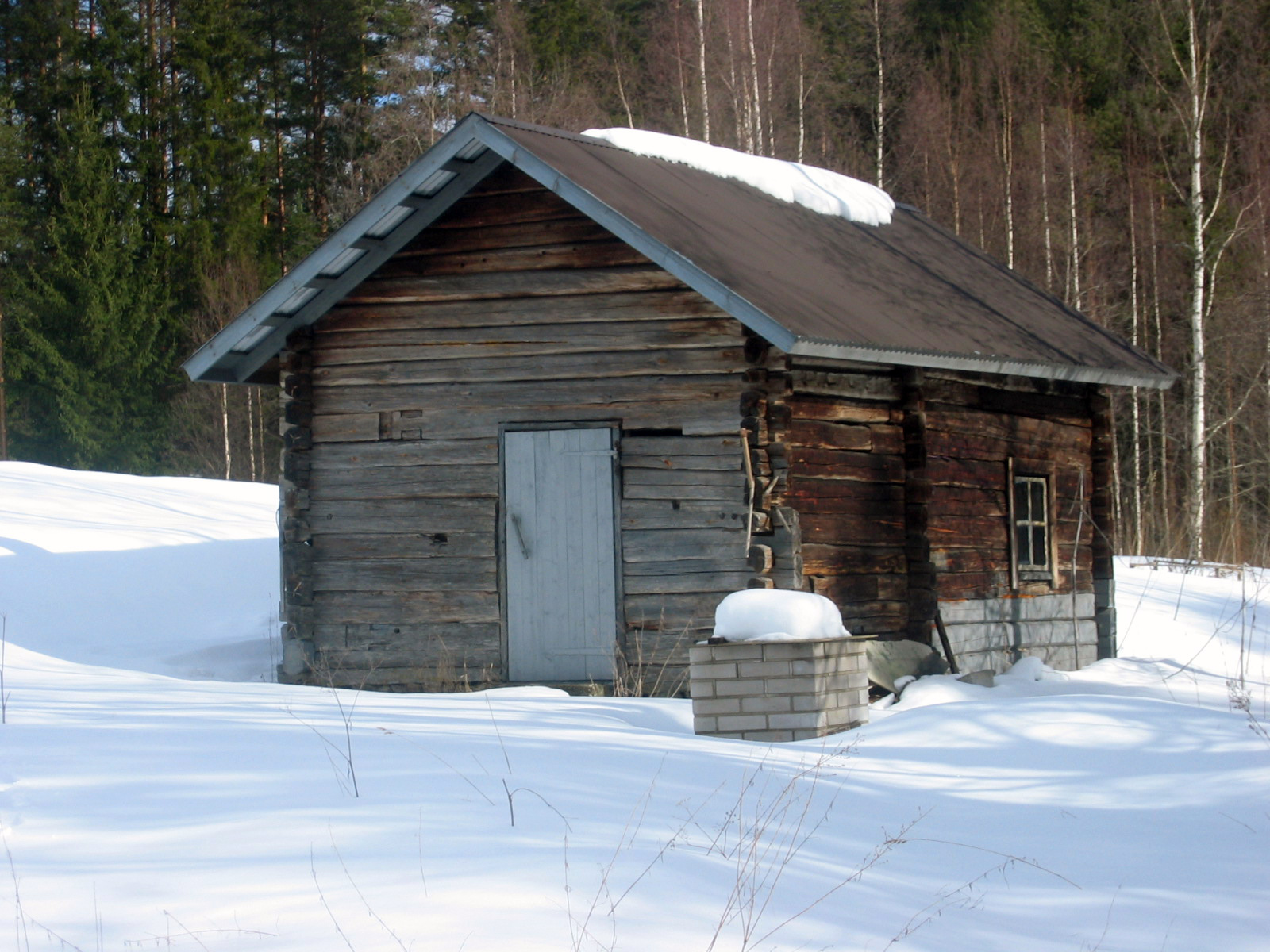
- A smoke sauna (savusauna) in Enonkoski, South Savo
- Country: Finland
- Criteria: Social practices
- Reference: 01596
- Region: Europe and North America

Inscription history
- Inscription: 2020 (15th session)
- List: Representative
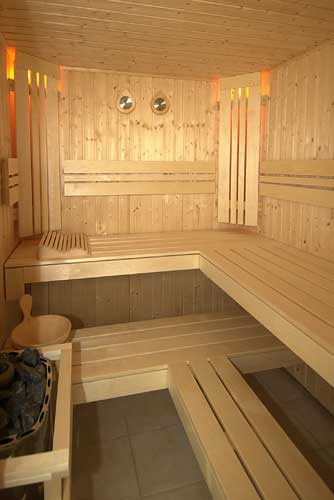
- A typical modern Finnish sauna

The Finnish sauna (Finnish pronunciation: [ˈsɑu̯nɑ], Swedish: bastu) is a substantial part of Finnish and Northern European culture.

Finnish sauna culture was inscribed on the UNESCO Intangible Cultural Heritage Lists at the 17 December 2020 meeting of the UNESCO Intergovernmental Committee for the Safeguarding of the Intangible Cultural Heritage. In the case of Estonia, the smoke sauna tradition in Võrumaa was added on the UNESCO Intangible Cultural Heritage Lists in 2014. As authorized by the state, the Finnish Heritage Agency commits, together with Finnish sauna communities and promoters of the sauna culture, to safeguard the vitality of the sauna tradition and to highlight its importance as part of customs and wellbeing. The word sauna itself is of Finnish origin.

During the Reformation in Scandinavia the popularity of saunas expanded to other countries because the European bath houses were being destroyed due to syphilis among other things being endemic.

Finns have used the sauna to live in, eat, and address matters of hygiene, including giving birth in an almost sterile environment. Unlike many other, more densely populated places in Europe, the wood needed to build and warm a sauna has been commonly available.

== Customs ==
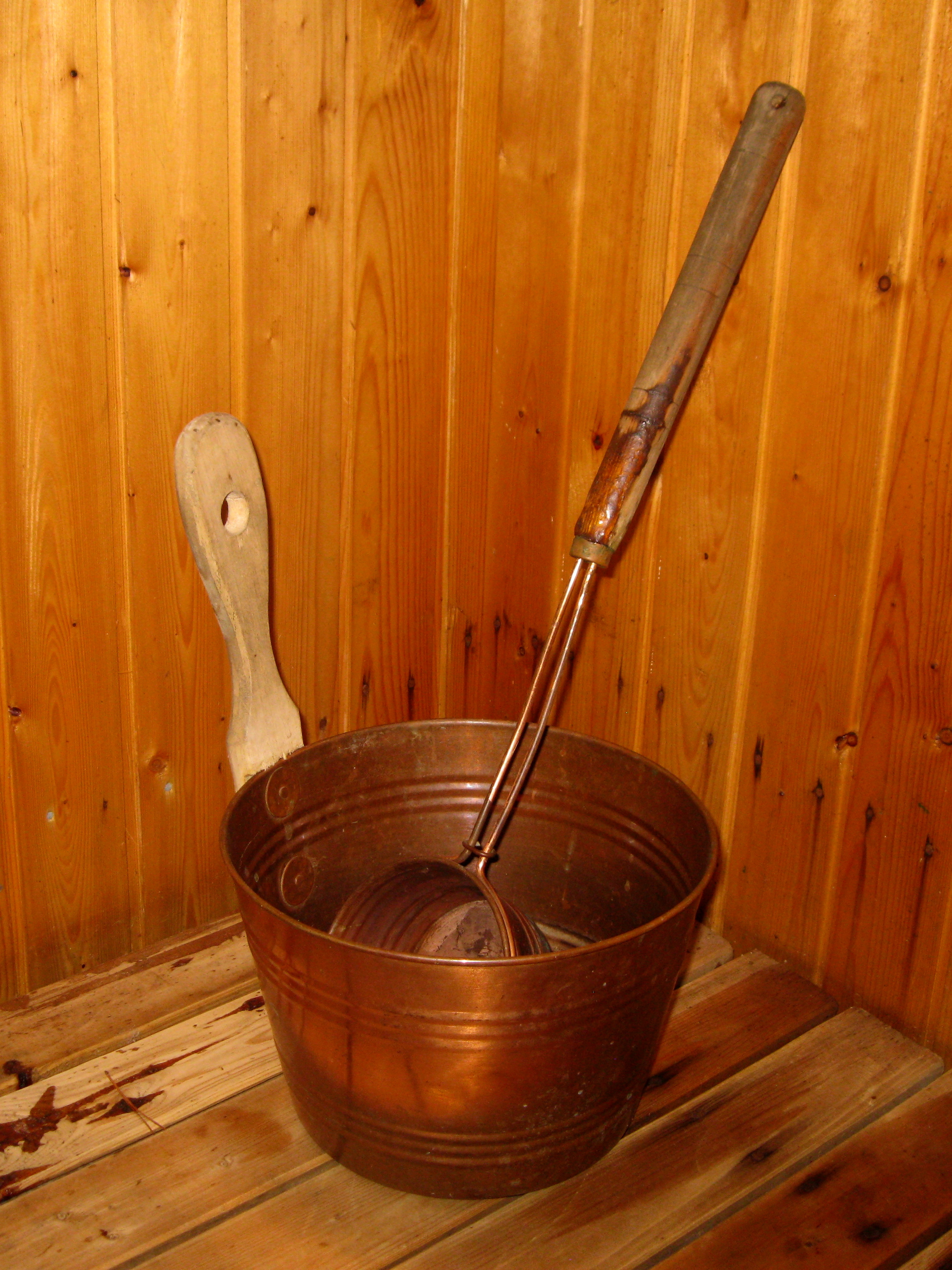
Sauna ladle and bucket

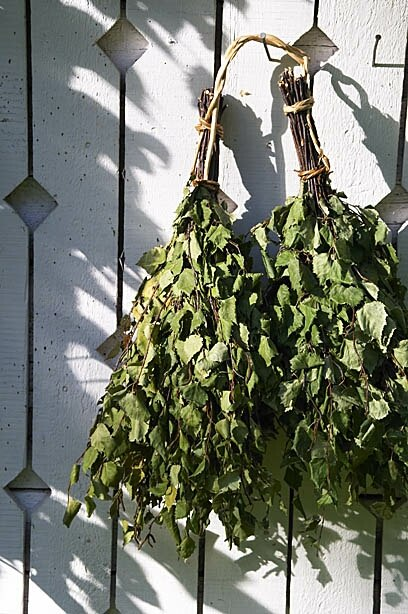
Finnish vihta (vasta in Eastern Finland), made of birch. It is used in traditional sauna-bathing for massage and stimulation of the skin.

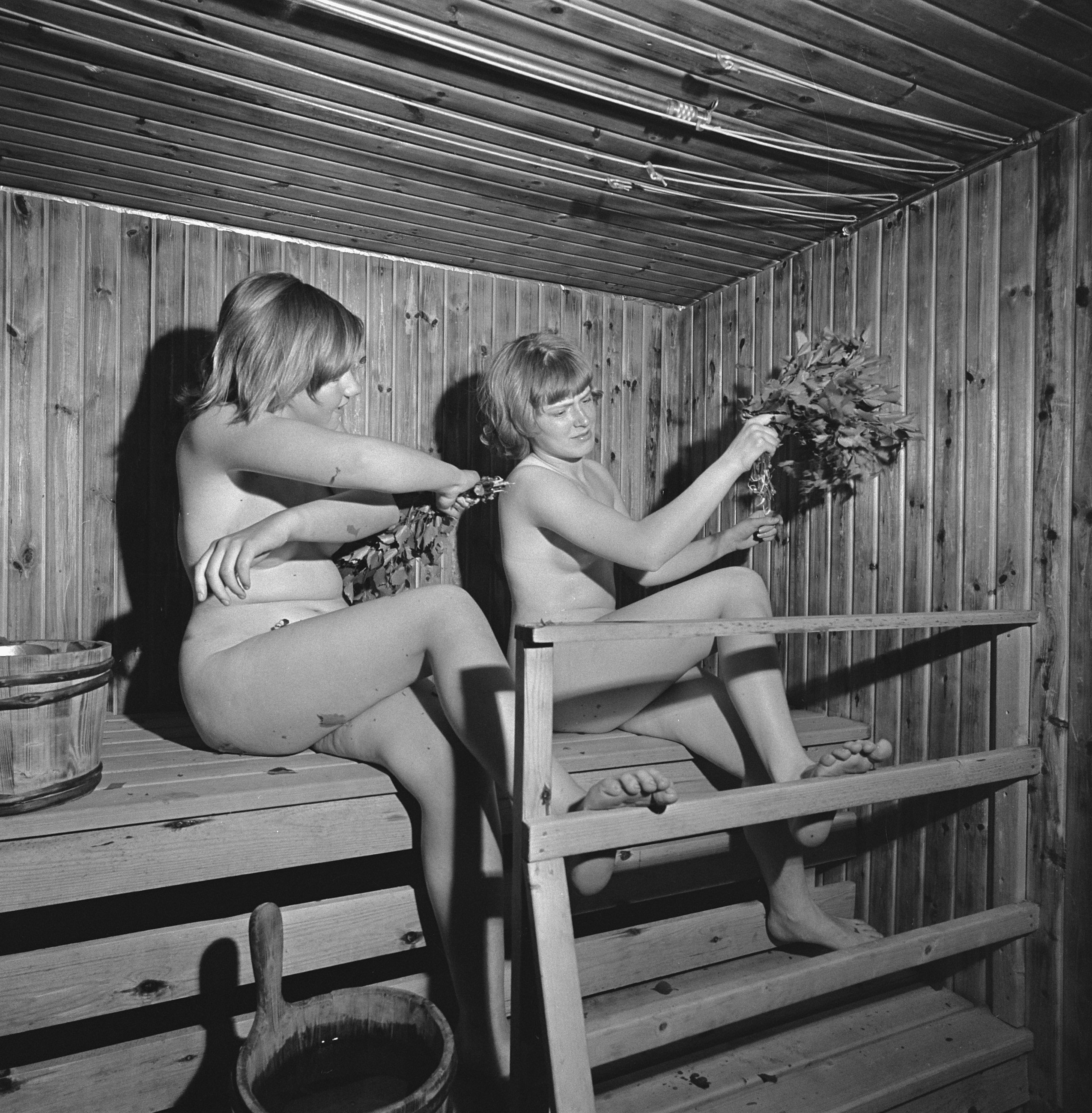
Women using vihtas

Saunas are an integral part of the way of life in Finland. They are found on the shores of Finland's numerous lakes, in private apartments, corporate headquarters, at the Parliament House and even at the depth of 1,400 metres (4,600 ft) in Pyhäsalmi Mine. The sauna is an important part of the national identity and those who have the opportunity usually take a sauna at least once a week. The traditional sauna day is Saturday.

The sauna tradition is so strong that whenever Finns go abroad, they relish the chance to have a good sauna: even the Finnish Church in Rotherhithe, London, has its own sauna. Finnish soldiers on peacekeeping missions are famous for their saunas; even on the UNMEE mission in Eritrea, a sauna was one of the first buildings to be erected. A Second World War-era Finnish military field manual states that a break of eight hours is all that is required for a battalion to build saunas, warm them and bathe in them. Saunas, even in the military, are strictly egalitarian places: no titles or hierarchies are used in the sauna.

Taking a sauna begins with having a wash (usually a shower), followed by a sit in the sauna room, the room being typically warmed to 80–110 °C (176–230 °F). Water is thrown on the hot stones topping the kiuas, a special stove used to warm up the sauna. This produces great amounts of steam, known as löyly, increasing the moisture and the apparent temperature within the sauna. Only the word löyly is used for this particular type of steam; the Finnish word höyry ('steam, vapour') is never used for it except in a scientific sense. Equivalents for löyly can be found in the Finnic languages such as the Karelian löyly, the Estonian leil, the Votic leülü, the Veps l'öl' and the Livonian löul. Its original sense signified 'spirit, breath, soul' and this is still seen in the Uralic languages--for example, the Udmurt lul, the Komi lol, the Mansi läl ('life'), the Khanty lil and the Hungarian lélek.

In the old religion, Löyly was an spirit. Once one threw water on the stove the smoke (or 'breath') was seen as Löyly, Spirit of life giving power."Death was noticed by observing bodily functions, but what was believed to happen to a human being after death? Fenno-Ugric people believed that a person had several souls. The breath (Fi. henki or löyly = steam raising from a sauna stove) was the power of life, the spirit that left the cooling body as vapour. Breath was meant for life and bodily functions. Life was constantly dependent on breath and lost when a person drew their last breath. The dead person had lost their breath. The word henki is also connected to supernatural beings, ghosts, and spirits of the dead. Breath is the soul that is closely connected to the body."

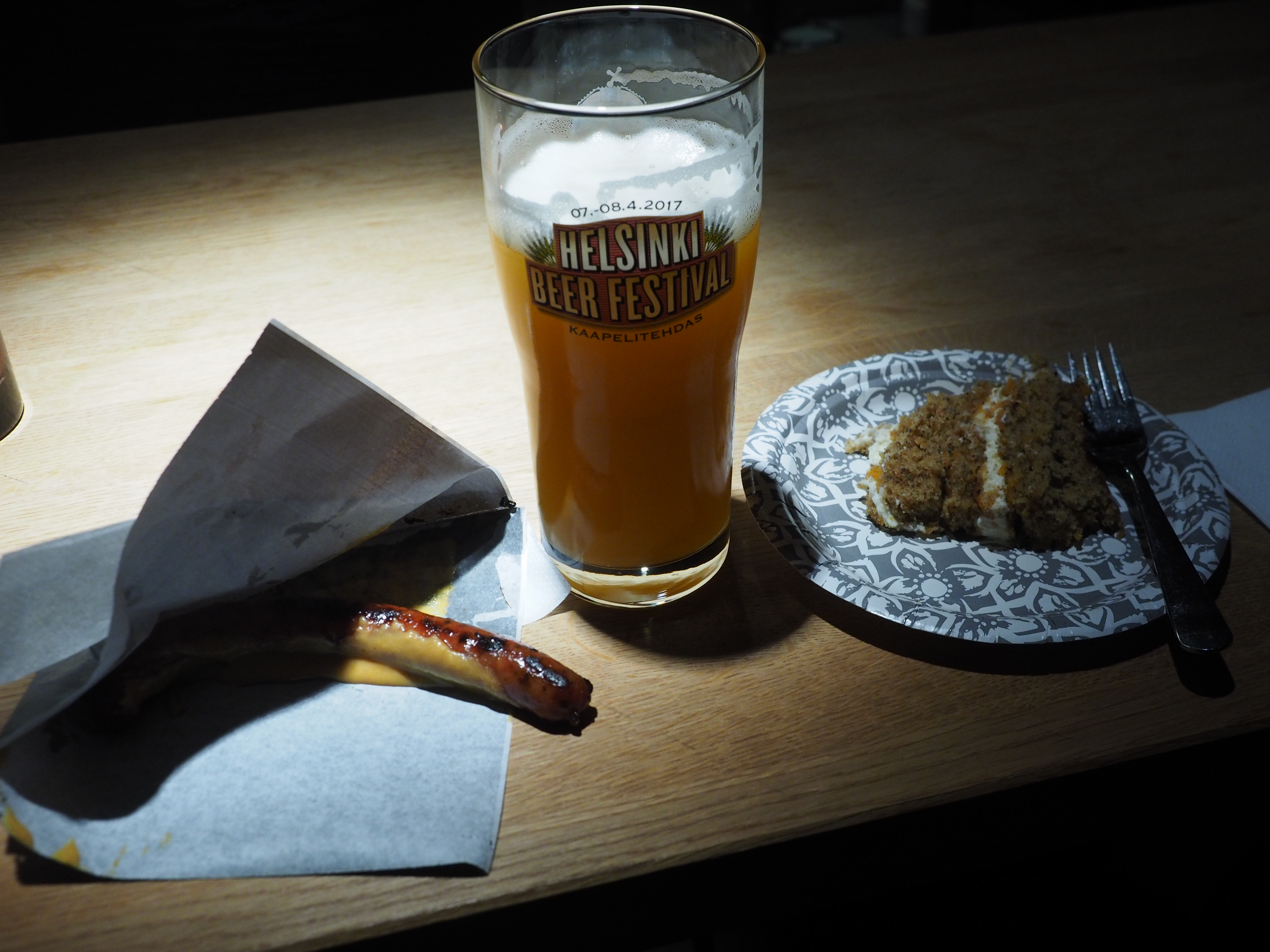
Sausages and beer are traditional refreshments after having a sauna.

Occasionally one uses a bunch of leafy, fragrant silver birch called a vasta (vihta in Western Finland) to gently beat oneself. This supposedly has a relaxing effect on the muscles and also helps to soothe the irritation from mosquito bites. When the heat begins to feel uncomfortable it is customary to jump into a lake, sea, or a swimming pool, or to have a shower. In the winter, rolling in the snow or even swimming in a hole cut in lake ice, an avanto, is sometimes used as a substitute. Often after the sauna it is a custom to sit down in the dressing room or on the porch of the sauna to enjoy a sausage, along with beer or soft drinks.

After cooling down from the first bath, one goes back into the hot room and begins the cycle again. The number and duration of hot room-cooling down cycles vary from person to person based on personal preference. Usually one takes at least two or three cycles, lasting between 30 minutes to two hours. In Finland's numerous summer cottages, bathing might go on well into the night. This is especially true in the summer when there's virtually no darkness at night. The sauna session itself is finished off with a thorough wash.

For someone brought up in Finland, the rules are instinctive but they are difficult to put into words. Depending on the size, composition, relationships, and the age structure of the group, three basic patterns can emerge: everyone can go to the sauna at the same time, men and women may take a sauna separately, or each family can go to sauna separately. Mixed saunas with non-family members are most common with younger adults, and are quite rare for older people or on more formal occasions. It is common for teenagers to stop going to sauna with their parents at some point.

In the sauna, it is a faux pas to wear clothing in the hot room, although it is acceptable to sit on a small towel or pefletti, a disposable tissue designed to endure heat and humidity (it can be mandatory in a public sauna, such as at a public swimming pool). While cooling off, it is common to wrap a towel around the body. For a typical Finn the sauna is, with few exceptions, a strictly non-sexual place; nudity in the sauna is a normal state of affairs among Finns without any connection with sexual intercourse. In Finland, a "sauna" means only a sauna, not a brothel, sex club, or such. In public saunas, swimsuits are banned from the hot room for health reasons: in many indoor swimming pools, chlorine is added to the water for hygiene reasons; if swimwear used in such water is brought to the hot room, the chlorine will vaporize and cause breathing problems for people with asthma or allergies.

In private homes or summer residences, the sauna is usually warmed to honor the guest and refusal may be more difficult. However, Finns will not typically be very offended if their guest declines. This is particularly common if going to the sauna would require a lot of effort from the guest (such as re-applying complex make-up afterwards), socially inconvenient (feeling uncomfortable about nudity or a mixed-sex sauna), or otherwise inconvenient (should the guest not have a change of clothes or if the sauna would take place late at night, et cetera).

== Types ==
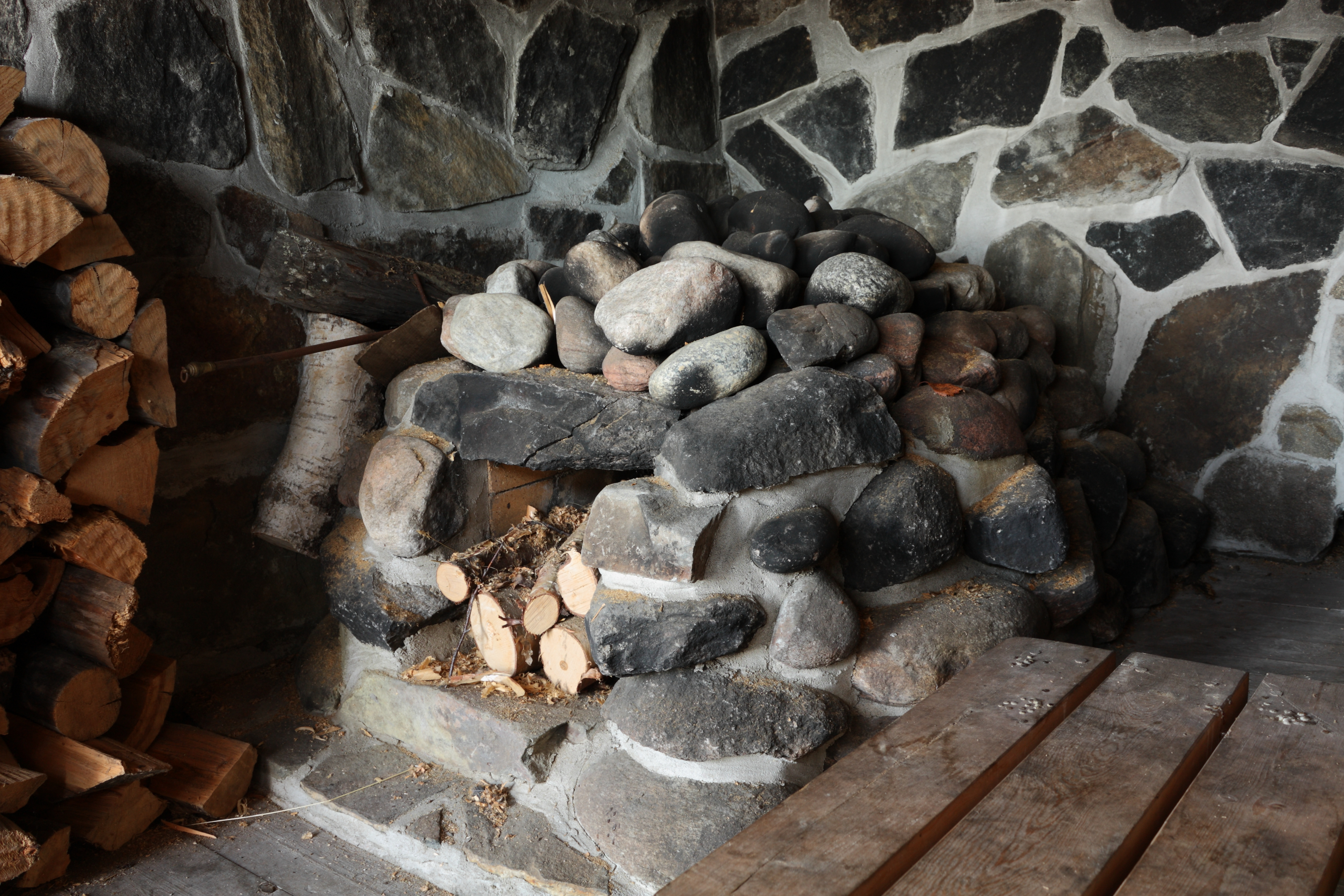
Interior of a smoke sauna in Utsjoki, Finland

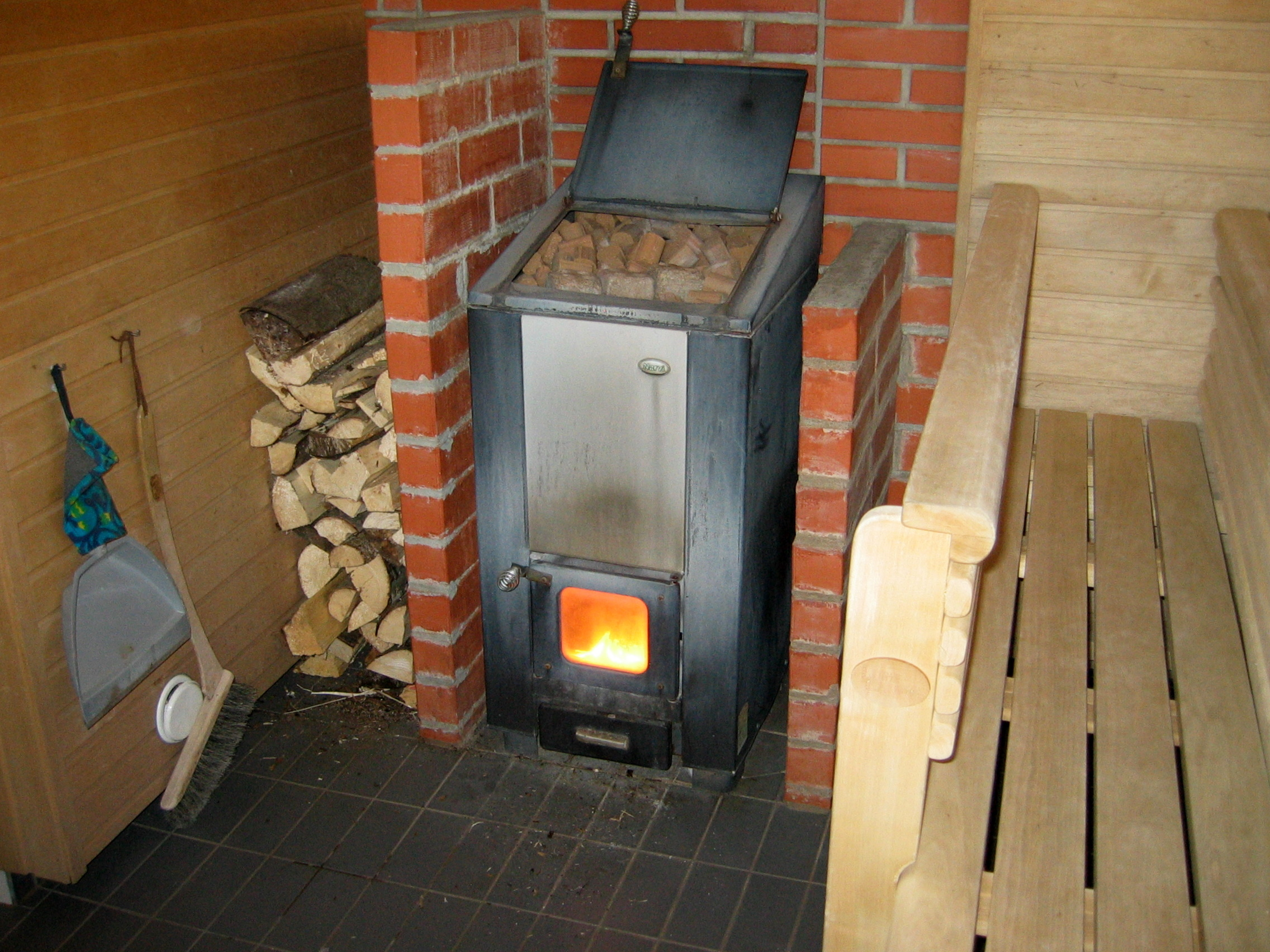
Wood sauna stove

Many different types of sauna can be found in Finland and Estonia. They can be classified either by the sauna building itself or by what kind of stove it uses.

The main division of saunas is between once warmed and continuously warmed stoves. All smoke saunas are once warmed, but there are also other types of ovens that are once warmed.

Once warmed stoves have larger amount of stones that are warmed up before the bathing. This can be done by burning wood, with or without a chimney, oil, wood pellets, or natural gas. Continuously warmed stoves have lower amount of stones that are heated during the bathing. The warming can be done burning wood, oil or natural gas, or electrically.

The temperature in Finnish saunas is 80 to 110 °C (176 to 230 °F), usually 80–90 °C (176–194 °F), and is kept clearly above the dewpoint despite the vaporization of löyly water, so that visible condensation of steam does not occur as in an Islamic hammam.

=== Smoke sauna ===
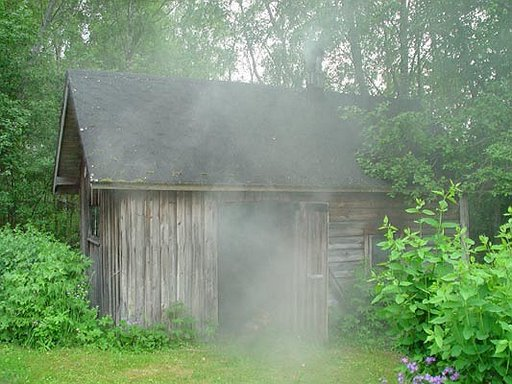
A smoke sauna in Vehmersalmi, Kuopio, North Savo

The savusauna (smoke sauna) does not have a chimney and thus as wood is burned, smoke fills the room. After the sauna reaches the appropriate temperature, the fire is extinguished and the room is ventilated. Given the construction of the room, the sauna retains sufficient heat for the duration of use. Although smoke saunas are considered a more traditional type, there has been a significant increase in construction in recent years. However, due to the amount of effort and time required to operate them – heating can take most of a day – they are not likely to replace most regular saunas.

Smoke saunas are still extant not only in Finland and Estonia, but also Latvia and Lithuania. They are considered to be cheap, simple to build, and durable (if measures of fire prevention are taken while building the sauna). The longevity is warranted by disinfectant features of smoke.

In 2014, UNESCO included the Estonian smoke sauna (suitsusaun) phenomenon in its Intangible Cultural Heritage list.

One specific and rarely seen curiosity is use of a wood pellet burner to heat a smoke sauna stove (savukiuas), typically the actual burner installed into a room adjacent to the actual sauna room and the kiuas. A wood pellet burner, quite similar to an oil burner, is then used to heat a smoke sauna stove – practically a big pile of rocks. As the burning process is much cleaner than with a conventional smoke stove, the smoke aroma is much less pungent and sooty, while the moisture produced by burning the pellets makes the air more pleasant than with continuously warmed stoves.

=== Wood stove sauna ===
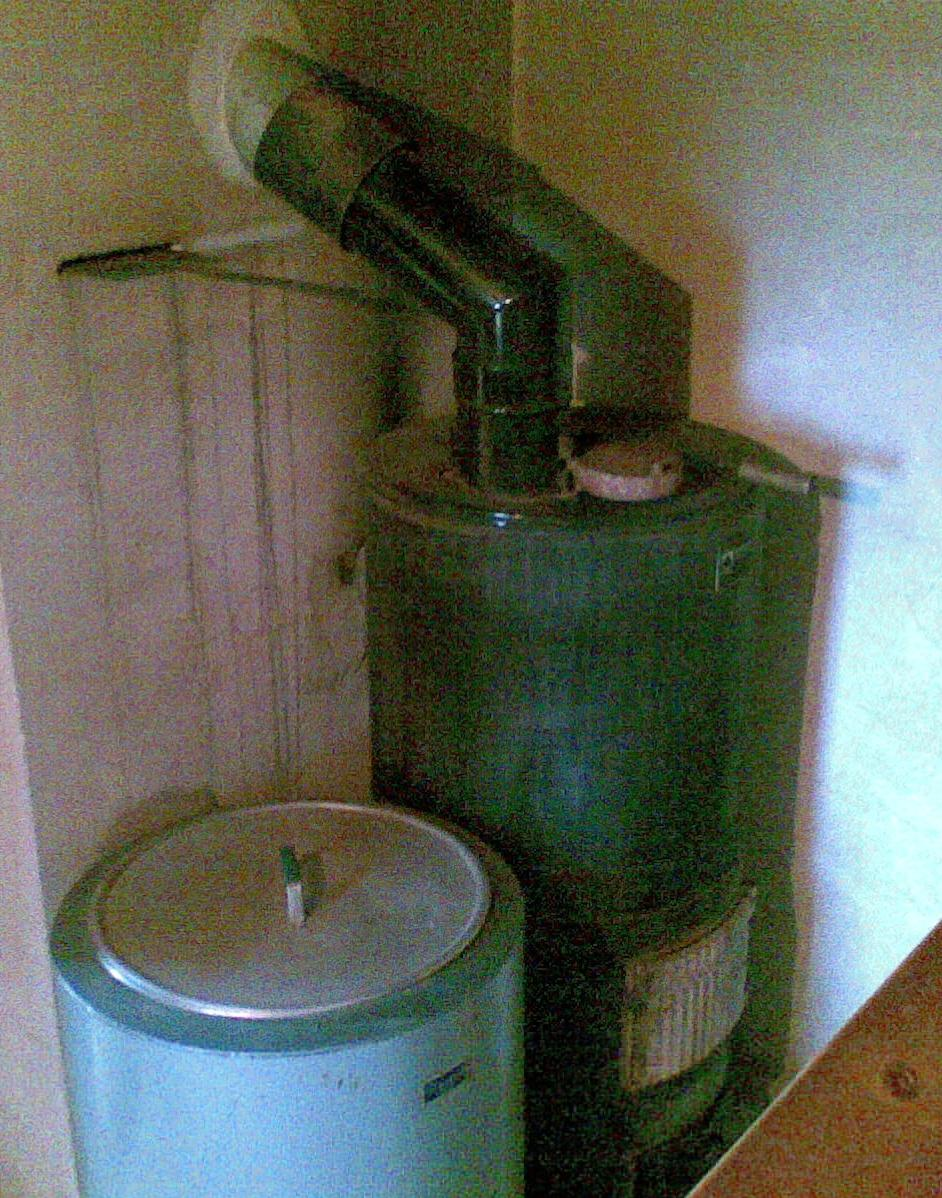
An authentic Finnish old-fashioned stove with a water heating boiler

The wood stove sauna is more common in rural areas, whereas the electric sauna is more common in urban areas. The metal stove with stones on top (kiuas) is heated with birch wood fire, and this heats the sauna room to the required temperature. If birch wood is not available any other wood will do, but well dried birch wood is preferred because of its good quality and smell, and long lasting burn. The important thing is to have a good löyly, that is when the stones are hot enough to evaporate the water thrown on them into steam that rises to the bathers. The bather in every type of sauna sits on a high bench near the ceiling where the hot steam reaches them quickly.

=== Electric sauna ===
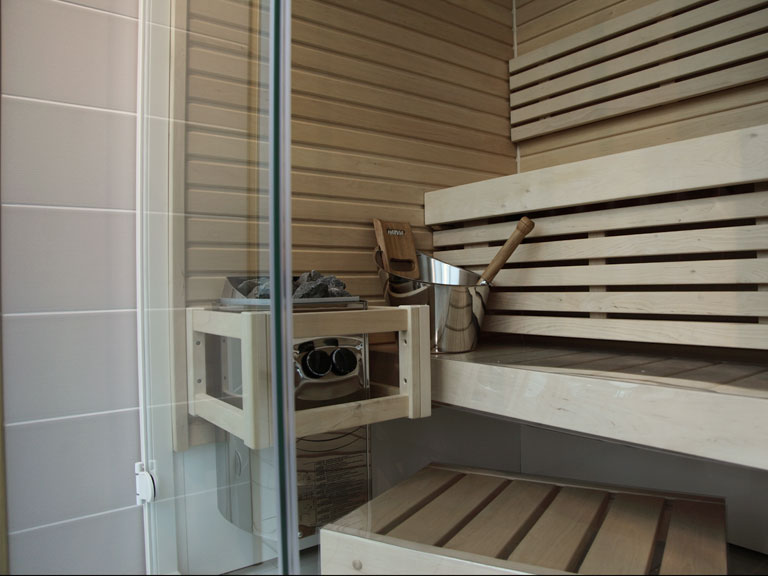
Electric sauna stove

In city apartments, and in most public saunas, an electric sauna stove (sähkökiuas) is used, as it does not require open fire and offers additional features like time delay settings, thermostat and temperature limiter. Electric saunas usually have kiuas stones piled over or around the heating element to allow löyly thrown onto them, either as an open, air circulating set-up or as a closed and insulated heat-storing one. Electric saunas often allow the property manager to control the sauna independently from occupants and can limit the sauna's electricity use. The controls can be wireless and can offer additional settings for sauna lighting, ventilation and steam generating devices. An apartment building's sauna is typically offered a few times a week to occupants with dedicated hours for communal men's and women's sauna, and special hours for those who have requested apartment specific hours. People might prefer the more atmospheric wood stove sauna over an electric sauna, but for those living in urban apartment blocks, that is rarely an option, and electric stoves are easier to use, more fire-safe, and do not produce wood litter.

=== Mobile saunas ===
Scouts and various other youth organizations often have portable tent saunas. Saunas have been built into cars, buses, car trailers, tractor trailers and even bicycles and boats. In central Helsinki, a couple of sauna cabins are available on the SkyWheel, a 40-meter tall Ferris wheel. In Finland, there are companies that rent mobile saunas, and an annual mobile sauna event in Teuva.

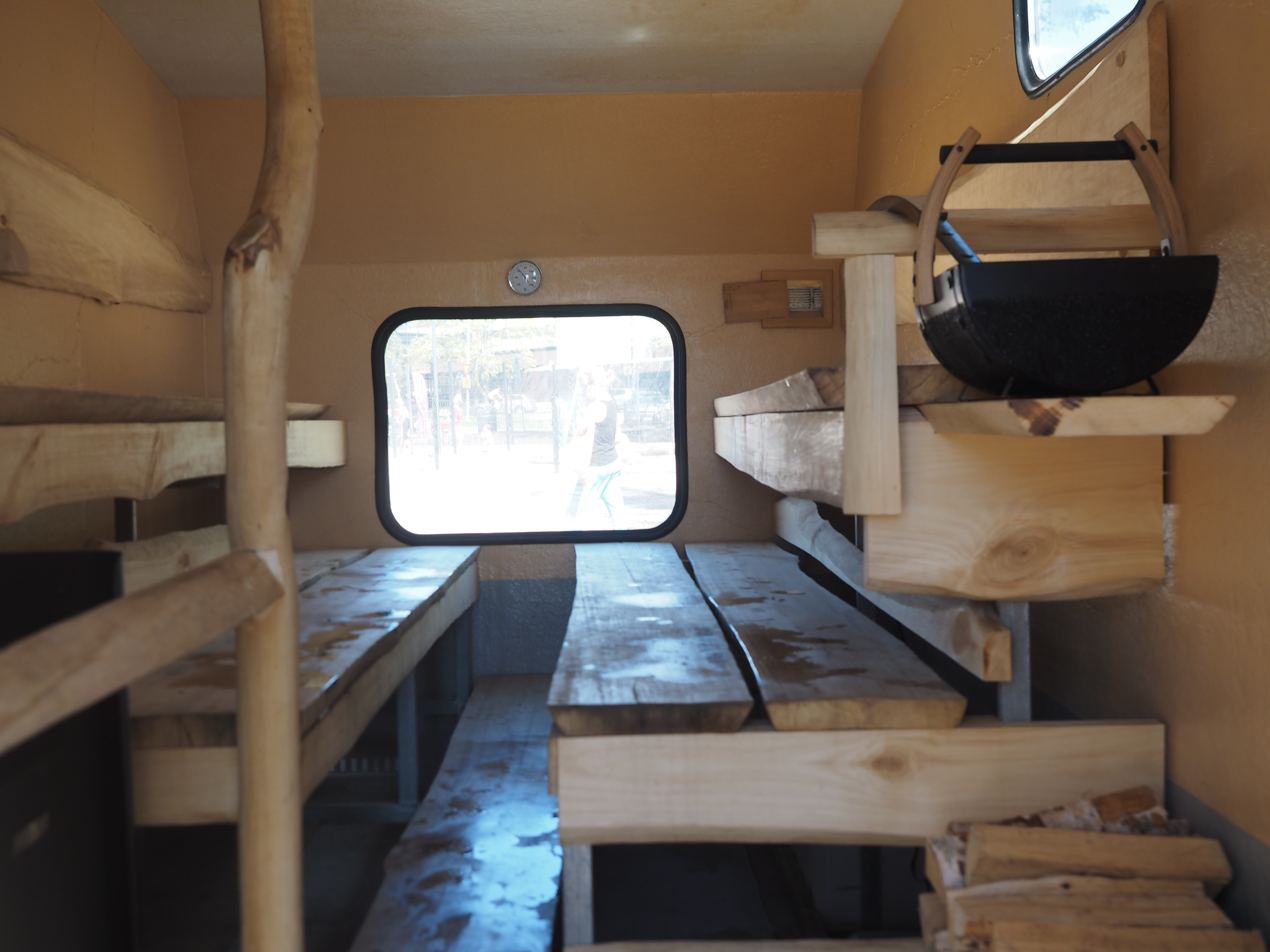
Inside a mobile sauna built into a trailer

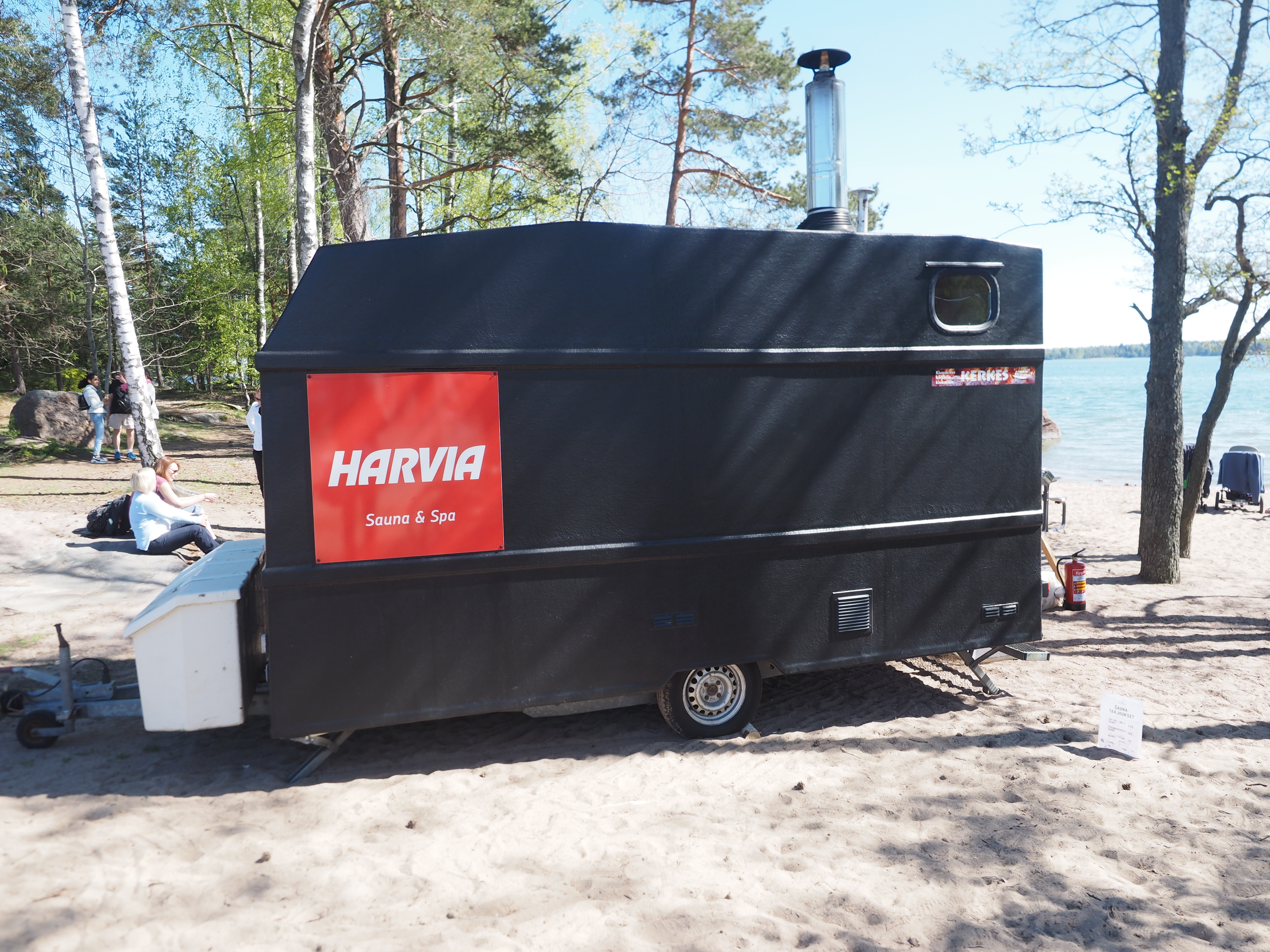
A mobile sauna built into a trailer

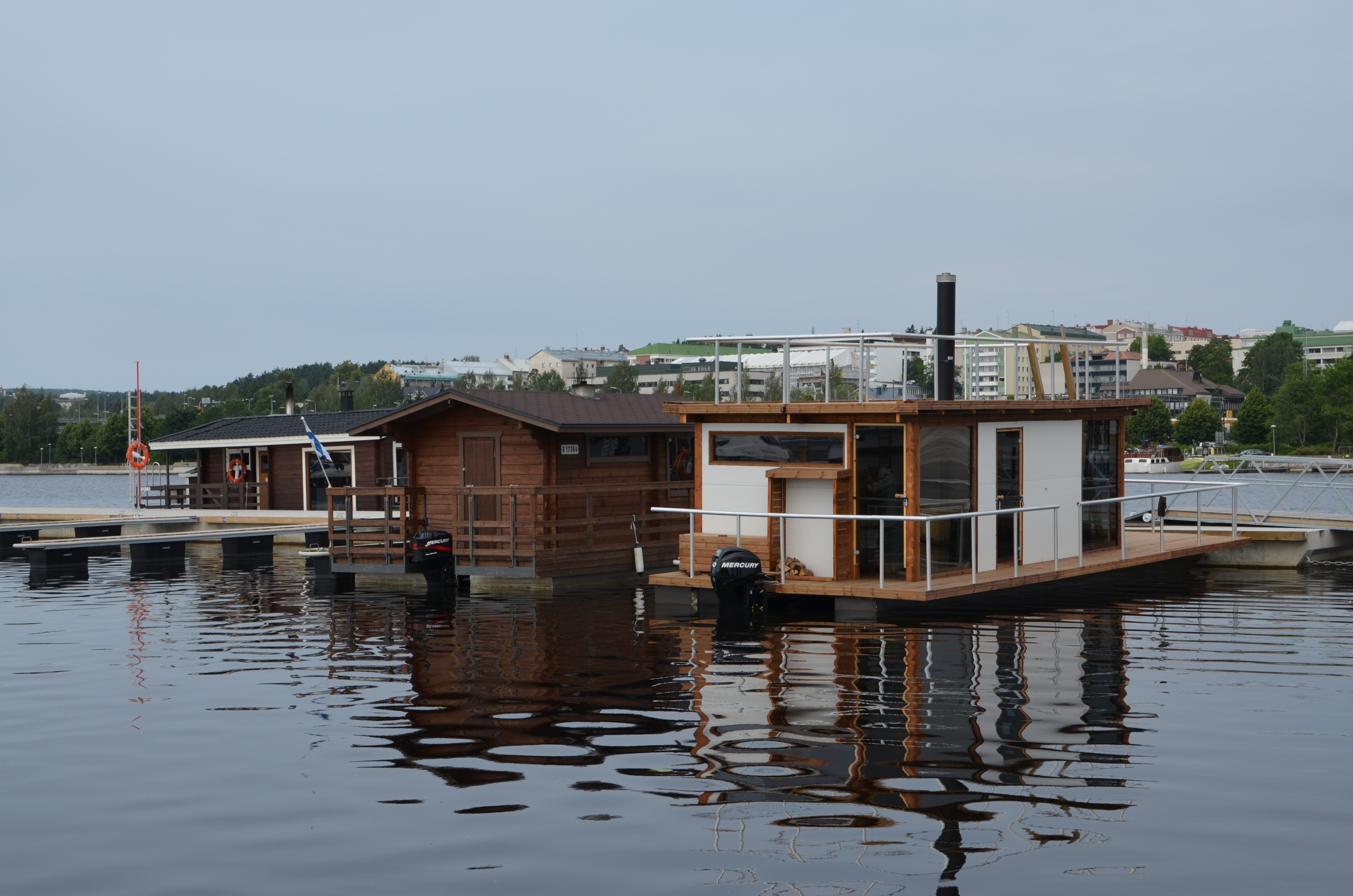
Saunaboats

== Bibliography ==
- Cooney, Rosanna (2025). Sweat house: the new & the ancient Irish sauna tradition. Dublin: Irelandia. ISBN 9-781-917-105-019.
- O'Kelly, Emma (2023). Sauna: the power of deep heat. London: Welbeck Balance. ISBN 978-1-80129-242-9.
