= Gaman (term) =

Japanese term of Zen Buddhist origin

Translations of Gaman
- English: Perseverance
- Japanese: 我慢

Gaman (我慢) is a Japanese term of Zen Buddhist origin which means "enduring the seemingly unbearable with patience and dignity". The term is generally translated as "perseverance", "patience", or "tolerance". A related term, gamanzuyoi (我慢強い, gaman-tsuyoi), a compound with tsuyoi (strong), means "suffering the unbearable" or having a high capacity for a kind of stoic endurance.

Gaman is variously described as a "virtue", an "ethos", a "trait", etc. It means to do one's best in distressed times and to maintain self-control and discipline.

Gaman is a teaching of Zen Buddhism.

== Analysis ==
Gaman has been attributed to the Japanese-Americans and others held in the American internment camps during World War II and to those affected by the 2011 Tōhoku earthquake and tsunami in northern Japan. In the internment camps, gaman was misperceived by the non-Japanese as introverted behavior or as a lack of assertiveness or initiative, rather than as a demonstration of strength in the face of difficulty or suffering. Gaman and the related term yase-gaman are, in Japanese society, closely related to complying with conformity and silent heroism, which seems to be hidden pride for compensation for sacrifice and being satisfied to pay reciprocal service in advance or to being seen themselves as victims by folks. Gaman toward authority, 'unquestioning obedience' or 'blind obedience' is supposed to be unfit to a healthy democracy.

The mentality of gaman seems to be derived from the strong conviction of Japanese way of fatalism, which was reinforced by Buddhism mujo, impermanence, nihilism, tradition of self destruction, the collective nature of its society, and the forced attitudes of resignation and submission under the Edo feudal period. Another contributing factor of its fatalism seems to be the fact that Japan' s most popular, indigenous religion, Shinto, does not have a written code of morals because its origin was in the illiterate period of Japan before the introduction of Confucianism and Buddhism. Those world-views were depicted in The Tale of the Heike, the works of Yoshida Kenkou, Kamo no Chomei. The sequence of events of Japanese fatalism seems to be explained as dormant, ceaseless accumulation of self-righteousness, which is justified by accusing other's faults rarely explicitly, mainly in their thought, and sudden manifestation of aggression if suppression (gaman) fails.

After the 2011 Tōhoku earthquake and tsunami, the resilience, civility, lack of looting and ability of the Japanese to help one another was widely attributed to the gaman spirit. The 50 to 70 heroes who remained at the damaged and radiation-emitting Fukushima Daiichi Nuclear Power Plant despite the severe danger demonstrated what was regarded as gaman as well.

Gaman is also used in psychoanalytic studies and to describe the attitudes of the Japanese. It is often taught to youth and is largely used by older Japanese generations. Showing gaman is seen as a sign of maturity and strength. Keeping private affairs, problems and complaints silent demonstrates strength and politeness as others have seemingly larger problems as well. If a person with gaman received help from someone else, they would be compliant, not ask for any additional help, and voice no concerns.

The strong vagueness of conceptual distinction among duty, obligation, voluntary sacrifice and love which are practiced by Japanese society and individuals, and the shortage of will to pursue justice, which were fostered by long experience of rigid class society seem to make room for gaman in Japanese society.

== See also ==
- Ganbaru
- Hirohito surrender broadcast
- Sisu
- Sobriety
- Stiff upper lip
- Shikata ga nai
- Yamato-damashii
- Honne and tatemae

== Bibliography ==
- Benedict, Ruth (1946). The Chrysanthemum and the Sword. Houghton Mifflin Harcourt. ISBN 9780547525143.
- Burns, Catherine (2005). Sexual Violence and the Law in Japan. Taylor & Francis. doi:10.4324/9780203429433. ISBN 9780203429433.
- DeMente, Boye (2004). Japan's Cultural Code Words: 233 Key Terms that Explain the Attitudes and Behavior of the Japanese. Tuttle Publishing. ISBN 9780804835749.
- Dower, John W. (1986). War without Mercy: Race & Power in the Pacific War. Pantheon. ISBN 9780394751726.
- Dower, John W. (1999). Embracing Defeat: Japan in the Wake of World War II. W. W. Norton & Company. ISBN 9780393345247.
- Hearn, Lafcadio (1904). Japan: An Attempt at Interpretation. Dodo Press.
- Hirasuna, Delphine; Hinrichs, Kit (2005). The Art of Gaman: Arts and Crafts from the Japanese American Internment Camps, 1942-1946. Berkeley: Ten Speed Press. ISBN 9781580086899. OCLC 494064406.
- Johnson, Frank A. (1995). Dependency and Japanese Socialization: Psychoanalytic and Anthropological Investigations Into Amae. New York University Press. ISBN 0814741924.
- Kolb, Patricia (2007). Social Work Practice with Ethnically and Racially Diverse Nursing Home Residents and Their Families. Columbia University Press. ISBN 9780231125321.
- MacFarlane, Alan (2007). Japan through the Looking Glass. Profile Books. ISBN 978-1847650580.
- Niiya, Brian (1993). Japanese American History: An A-to-Z Reference from 1868 to the Present. Facts on File. ISBN 9780816026807. OCLC 26853950.
- Takeo, Doi (1971). The anatomy of dependence. Kodansha International. ISBN 9780870114946.
- van Wolferen, Karel (1989). The Enigma of Japanese Power: People and Politics in a Stateless Nation. A.A. Knopf. ISBN 9780394577968.
- West, Mark I. (2009). The Japanification of Children's Popular Culture: from Godzilla to Miyazaki. Scarecrow Press. ISBN 9780810851214. OCLC 232786129.
