= Infighting =

Infighting may refer to:

- Intragroup conflict, conflict within the boundaries of a group
- Horizontal hostility, displaced aggression by oppressed peoples toward themselves or members of their own group
- Infighting (martial arts), martial arts techniques used while near the opponent.
