= Fight Club (disambiguation) =

Fight Club is a 1999 film directed by David Fincher.

Fight Club may also refer to:

- Fight club, an underground street fighting ring
- Fight Club (novel), a 1996 novel by Chuck Palahniuk on which Fincher's film is based
- Fight Club (video game), a 2004 video game based on the film
- Fight Club: Members Only, a 2006 Indian film
- "Fight Club" (The X-Files), a 2000 episode of The X-Files
- Eurosport Fight Club, a sport program broadcast by Eurosport
- "Fight Club", a song by Lights from Skin & Earth
- "Fight Club", a song by Violent J from the album The Shining
- Fight Club DC, a defunct skatepark in Washington, D.C.
- The Fight Club, a Canadian MMA promoter
- Fight Club (2023 film), a 2023 Indian film
- Fight Club (U.S. Senate), a group of U.S. senators

== See also ==
- Fight Klub, a trading card game
- Mahjong Fight Club, a video game series developed by Konami
