= Ganbaru =

Japanese phrase for perseverance

Ganbaru (頑張る; lit. 'stand firm'), also romanized as gambaru, is a Japanese word which roughly means to slog on tenaciously through tough times.

The word ganbaru is often translated as "doing one's best", but in practice, it means doing more than one's best. The word emphasizes "working with perseverance" or "toughing it out".

Ganbaru means "to commit oneself fully to a task and to bring that task to an end". It can be translated as persistence, tenacity, doggedness, and hard work. The term has a unique importance in Japanese culture.

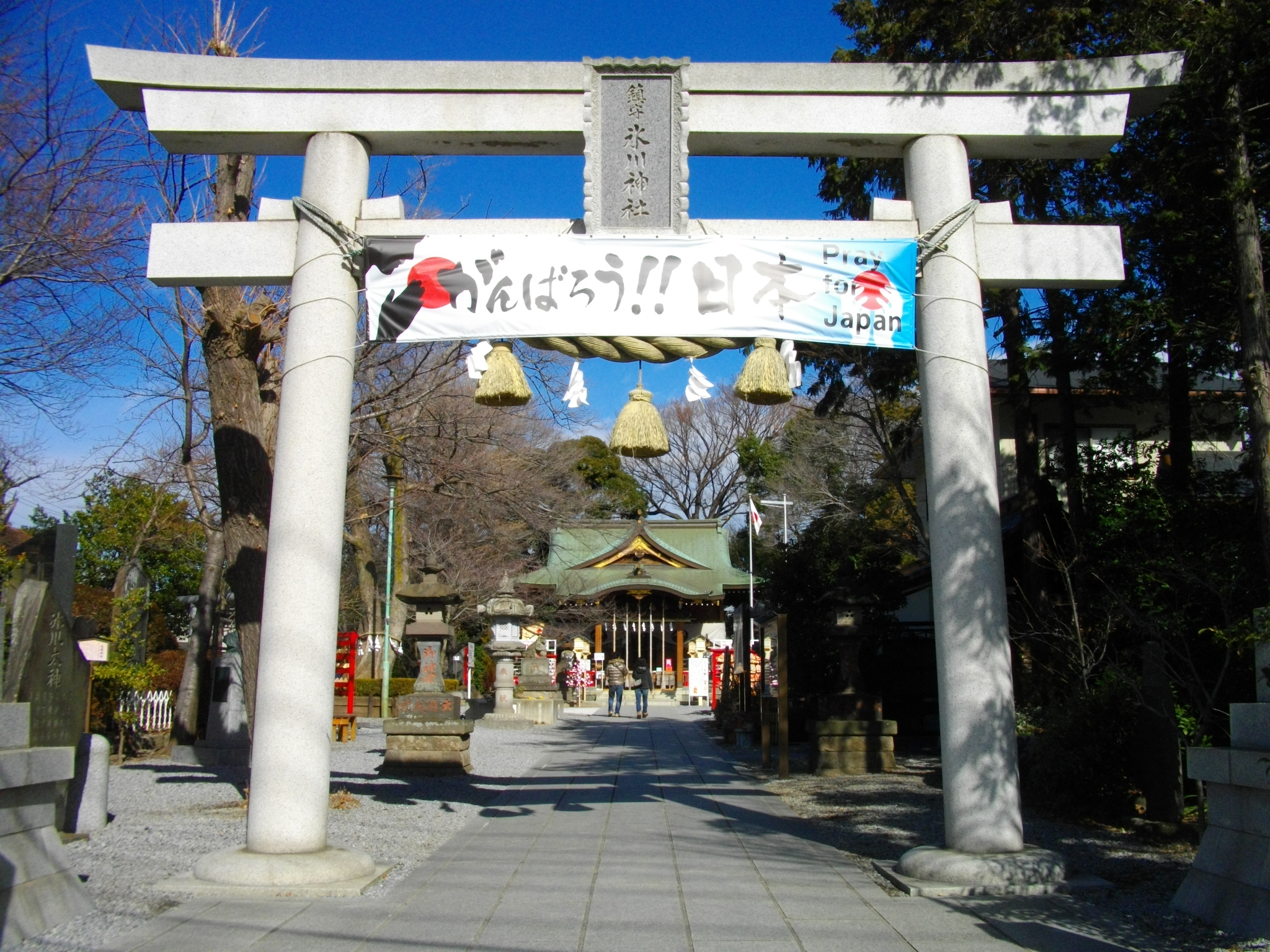
Sign on a torii gate proclaiming "Gambaro Japan!"

The New York Times said of Shoichi Yokoi, the Japanese holdout who surrendered in Guam in January 1972, that in Japan "even those embarrassed by his constant references to the Emperor felt a measure of admiration at his determination and ganbaru spirit". After the 1995 Kobe earthquake, the slogan "Gambaro Kobe" was used to encourage the people of the disaster region as they worked to rebuild their city and their lives. After the 2011 Tōhoku earthquake and tsunami, gambaru was one of the most commonly heard expressions.

== Etymology ==
The modern spelling is ateji using the 頑 character to represent an unknown original lexeme.

The sense was originally to be stubborn, to be obstinate, with negative overtones. The modern positive sense of to persist, to endure has arisen since the end of the Edo period in 1868.

There are three theories of the origin:

- Sense shift from 眼張る (ganbaru, "to keep watch on something, to stare at something", literally "keep one's eye on something")
- Shift in reading from 我に張る (ga ni haru, literally "to stick to one's desires, to insist on one's point of view")
- An unknown etymology based on the historical kana form ぐわんばる

== Analysis ==
Gambaru focuses on the importance of finishing a task and never stopping until a goal is achieved. The continuing effort to overcome obstacles (even if not successful) is an important concept in Japan.

Unlike the related, but passive gaman, ganbaru is an active process.

Although there are many near synonyms in Japanese, there are few antonyms.

== See also ==
- The Book of Five Rings – Text on kenjutsu and the martial arts in general
- Gaman - a similar Japanese term
- Jiayou – a Chinese term of similar meaning
- Paiting – a Korean term of similar meaning
- Sisu – a Finnish word denoting tenacity and a broader concept
- Stoicism – Ancient philosophy
