= Future Immersive Training Environment =

The Future Immersive Training Environment (FITE) Joint Capability Technology Demonstration (JCTD) was a three-year $36-million Department of Defense initiative to demonstrate the value of advanced small unit immersive infantry training systems. It demonstrated infantry applications of virtual reality, mixed reality, and augmented reality.
