= Bruce Lee: The Fighter (soundtrack) =

Bruce Lee

Soundtrack album by S. Thaman
- Released: 16 September 2014
- Recorded: 2014
- Genre: Feature film soundtrack
- Length: 22:02
- Language: Telugu
- Label: Zee Music Company
- Producer: S. Thaman

S. Thaman chronology
Saagasam (2015)	Bruce Lee (2014)	Sher (2015)

Bruce Lee: The Fighter is the soundtrack to the 2014 Telugu-language masala film of the same name directed by Srinu Vaitla and produced by D. V. V. Danayya under DVV Entertainment, starring Ram Charan. The film features musical score by S. Thaman who composed five songs for the film with lyrics written by Sri Mani and Ramajogayya Sastry. The soundtrack was released under the Zee Music Company label on 16 September 2014.

== Development ==
In March 2014, Anirudh Ravichander signed in as the composer making his Telugu debut. He met Charan at his residence in Hyderabad, with Danayya and Vaitla also being present and eventually agreed to be a part of the film after liking the script. But, the following month, Anirudh opted out of the project due to reasons unknown, which led Vaitla to replace with S. Thaman who previously worked with Vaitla on Dookudu (2011), Baadshah (2013) and Aagadu (2014). Thaman confirmed his involvement through his Twitter page later.

Besides Thaman, Simha and Megha performing two songs for the album, all the tracks were performed by relatively new singers: Saisharan, Nivas, Rabbit Mac, Deepak Blue, Ramya Behara and Sameera Bharadwaj performed the songs in their maiden Telugu music stint. Thaman worked on re-recording the film's background score during early September 2013 and completed within nine days, closer to the film's release.

== Release ==
Initially, the film's music was speculated to be launched on 10 July 2014 at the Shilpakala Vedika in Hyderabad but was delayed due to reasons unknown. The film's audio launch was held at the Hitex Convention Centre in Madhapur, Hyderabad on 9 September 2014, with the presence of the film's cast and crew and Chiranjeevi being the chief guest. The soundtrack album was marketed and released by Zee Music Company, thus making its debut in Telugu.

== Critical reception ==
The Times of India, stated that "the album is sure to strike a chord with the masses", and gave 3 out of 5 stars. Behindwoods gave 2.75 out of 5 and stated "Bruce Lee stays true to the massy combination of Srinu Vaitla–Thaman". Karthik Srinivasan of Milliblog called it as an "above-average soundtrack from Thaman." Suhas Yellapantula of The New Indian Express wrote "SS Thaman continues to churn out repetitive numbers and the music is ordinary at best." Latha Srinivasan of Daily News and Analysis wrote "Thaman's BGM for the movie is apt and two of the numbers in the film – title song and 'Leh chalo' – are a must mention. They are peppy and have been well-shot." A reviewer from Sify wrote "The one technician who deserves more appreciation is S S Thaman - his songs are catchy and background score is also good. 'Le Chalo' and 'Mega Meter' are the pick of the lot. They are also shot nicely with awesome dance steps."

== Track listing ==
No.	Title	Lyrics	Singer(s)	Length
1.	"Run"	Sri Mani	Saisharan, Nivas	4:20
2.	"Ria"	Ramajogayya Sastry	Rabbit Mac, Deepak	4:04
3.	"Kung Fu Kumaari"	Ramajogayya Sastry	Deepak, Ramya Behara	4:26
4.	"Le Chalo"	Ramajogayya Sastry	S. Thaman, Megha	4:30
5.	"Bruce Lee"	Ramajogayya Sastry	Simha, Sameera Bharadwaj	4:42
Total length:				22:02

== Accolades ==
Award (Note: Awards are in Alphabetical order.)	Date of ceremony (Note: Date is linked to the article about the awards held that year, wherever possible.)	Category	Recipient(s)	Result	Ref.
Mirchi Music Awards South	27 July 2016	Album of the Year	Bruce Lee – The Fighter – S. Thaman	Nominated	
Mirchi Music Awards South	27 July 2016	Music Composer of the Year	S. Thaman – ("Kung Fu Kumari")	Nominated	
Mirchi Music Awards South	27 July 2016	Lyricist of the Year	Ramajogayya Sastry – ("Kung Fu Kumari")	Nominated	
Mirchi Music Awards South	27 July 2016	Upcoming Male Vocalist of the Year	Saisharan – ("Run")	Nominated	
Mirchi Music Awards South	27 July 2016	Upcoming Male Vocalist of the Year	Deepak – ("Kung Fu Kumari")	Won	
Mirchi Music Awards South	27 July 2016	Upcoming Female Vocalist of the Year	Sameera Bharadwaj – ("Bruce Lee")	Nominated	
South Indian International Movie Awards	30 June – 1 July 2016	Best Music Director – Telugu	S. Thaman	Nominated	
