= Pefletti =

Small sheet on a sauna bench

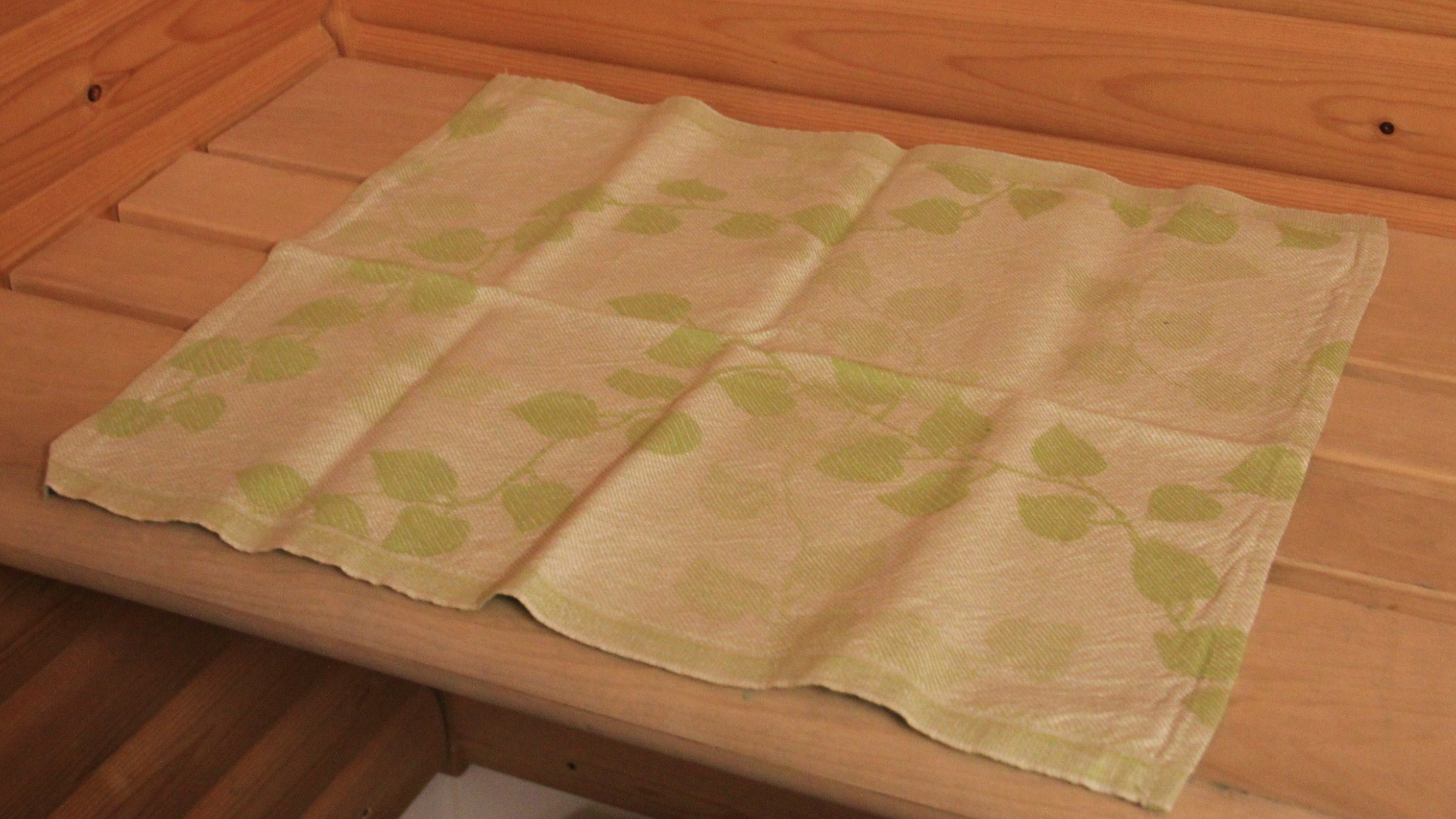
Linen pefletti.

In Finland, a pefletti (Finnish and colloquial Finland Swedish) is a sheet of paper, cardboard, cloth, foam rubber or other soft material that is placed on the sauna bench and then sat on.

== Purpose ==
The purpose of pefletti is to maintain good hygiene, in a public same-sex, nude sauna, by preventing genital contact with the bench. Another purpose is to prevent discomfort from sitting on a hot surface.

The pefletti come in both disposable and re-usable varieties.

The word pefletti is a combination of the Finnish words "peffa", which is a mild slang word for one's behind, and "tabletti", meaning placemat.

The pefletti has a role in the very traditional yet varied sauna habits in Finland; it is one of the “do’s … of the Finnish sauna.”

The larger kind of "pefletti" made of linen or cotton fabric, that covers either the majority of the width of the sauna bench, or a single seat of the bench and backrest for one sitter is called a laudeliina. This cloth is usually washed after each use and used for sanitary and comfort purposes such as the pefletti.

== See also ==
- Sisu
