= Fite, Republic of Dagestan =

Fite Фите
- Selo
- Location within Republic of Dagestan Location within Russia
- Coordinates: 41°47′N 47°44′E
- Country: Russia
- Region: Republic of Dagestan
- District: Agulsky District
- Time zone: UTC+3:00

Fite (Russian: Фите) is a rural locality (a selo) in Agulsky District, Republic of Dagestan, Russia. The population was 751 as of 2010.

== Geography ==
Fite is located 18 km east of Tpig (the district's administrative centre) by road. Goa is the nearest rural locality.
