= Infighting (martial arts) =

Infighting is the name given to certain martial art techniques used while near the opponent. The Chinese martial art of Wing Chun specializes in infighting.

== Technique ==
The key points of infighting are the control of the enemy's angle of attack, i.e., to control and limit the ways or angles through which an opponent may find an opening in one's guard to counterattack or get past a block or guard. This is attained by controlling the opponent's attacking limb, transferring momentum and debilitating his stability by forcing his posture/position and shifting his mass on his center line. Examples include:

- Chi sao drills in Wing Chun
- Tui shou in Tai Chi
- Joint-lock flow in Small Circle JuJitsu
- Hubud-Lubud of Filipino Martial Arts

Secondary elements include the creation of angles of attack and defense by maneuvering the limbs of the opponent, parrying and blocking properly with the necessary movements and posture to gain the upper hand and strike from a safe angle.

== Distance of travel ==
One key element to infighting is the distance traveled by the attacking limb. Infighting is a way to attack to the opponent's center line while preventing a counterattack that can travel straight towards the attacker's center line. Even at a close distance, when the fighters' torsos are very close, the attacker might use their arms at full extension and focus the stress point or attack/defense portions of their limbs at their ends. Distance in infighting isn't what gives it its name, but instead, it's how to get past the opponent's guard and fight inside of it. An example would be to say that a fighter, even at a distance where his jab is touching his opponent's chin with the opponent not leaning backwards or forwards, at a neutral stance, is an infighter when his blows and blocks use the space between them and the opponent has to attack from an outward angle (use haymakers or hooks).
