= Paiting =

Korean word of support or encouragement

Paiting! (Korean: 파이팅, pronounced [pʰaitʰiŋ]) or Hwaiting! (Korean: 화이팅, pronounced [ɸwaitʰiŋ]) is a Korean word of support or encouragement. It is frequently used in sports or whenever a challenge such as a difficult test or unpleasant assignment is met. It derives from a Konglish borrowing of the English word "Fighting!"

== Description ==
Paiting as used in Korean has undergone the process of translanguaging, causing it to have different meanings in English and Korean. In English, "fighting" is a verb (specifically, a present participle) whereas cheers and exclamations of support usually take the form of imperative verbs. Paiting!’s Japanese equivalent, for example, is the more grammatically standard Faito! (ファイト). For that reason, paiting! is often translated in English as "Come on!" or "Let's go!" Daehan Minguk Paiting! ("대한민국 파이팅!") might be glossed as "Go, Korea!" English does sometimes use adjectives and nouns as words of support ("Good!" "Good job!") but the original meaning of fighting simply implies some conflict exists; it doesn't imply either side will be victorious and offers no support.

Paiting! is often accompanied by the expression Aja aja! (Korean: 아자 아자), which has a similar meaning. The pronunciation Hwaiting, despite often being used colloquially, is not included in important Korean dictionaries such as Standard Korean Language Dictionary.

Due to the global popularization of Korean pop culture (known as Korean Wave or hallyu), paiting! has returned to the English language. In September 2021 the interjection was added to the Oxford English Dictionary under the entry "fighting, int", distinguishing it from the native English usage of the word.

Paiting! is limited to only South Korean dialects of the Korean language. North Korean dialects do not include paiting! due to the limited contact with the English world and general tendency to translate loanwords into 'pure' Korean.

== Variations ==
Spelling and pronunciation of paiting! as an interjection varies in Korean. This is due to the voiceless labiodental fricative sound [f] not existing in Korean. To make up for this, the sound is adjusted in Korean to either an aspirated voiceless bilabial stop [pʰ], or the combination of a voiceless bilabial fricative and labiovelar semivowel [ɸw]. These pronunciations are then romanized back into English as either "paiting" or "hwaiting".

== Related terms ==
In addition to Faito!, terms used similarly in East Asia are the Chinese Jiayou! (加油, lit. "add oil!") and Japanese Ganbatte! (頑張って). The growing importance of Korean pop culture means that "Fighting!" is now sometimes used in Chinese-to-English and Japanese-to-English translations as well to convey these native phrases.
