= Alfred Kroeber: A Personal Configuration =

1970 biography by Theodora Kroeber

- Author: Theodora Kroeber
- Language: English
- Genre: Biography
- Publisher: University of California Press
- Publication date: 1970
- Pages: 292
- ISBN: 9780520015982

Alfred Kroeber: A Personal Configuration is a 1970 biography of the anthropologist Alfred Louis Kroeber, written by Theodora Kroeber. Theodora was married to Alfred between 1926 and his death in 1960. She began writing professionally in the 1950s, after her children were grown: the books she authored included Ishi in Two Worlds (1962). Theodora began a biography of her husband after his death in 1960, but could not complete it before her 1969 marriage to John Quinn, with whose encouragement she published it. The term "configuration" in the title refers to Alfred's exploration of cultural change in his work.

The book covers Alfred Kroeber's entire life, including his childhood in New York City, his education at Columbia University and his work in anthropology under Franz Boas, his eventual employment at the University of California, Berkeley, and a difficult period during which he endured illness and the deaths of his first wife and of Ishi. Approximately half the book covers the period after his second marriage to Theodora, including his various field trips, and his life in retirement. Theodora Kroeber's writing was universally praised by reviewers: anthropologist George W. Stocking Jr. wrote that her "gift for [evocative] and moving descriptive writing" was frequently evident. Reviews also discussed the biography's illumination of Alfred Kroeber's scholarly development and called it a work of value to anthropologists, while others found it wanting as an "intellectual biography".

== Background and writing ==
Theodora Kroeber decided to study anthropology in graduate school at the University of California, Berkeley, in 1923, shortly after the death of her first husband, Clifford Spencer Brown. There she met Alfred Louis Kroeber, a leading American anthropologist of his generation and the head of the anthropology department. She had previously taken classes with Alfred's assistant Thomas Waterman, but had not encountered Alfred. Theodora and Alfred married on March 26, 1926. Alfred, 21 years older than Theodora, had also been previously married: his first wife had died of tuberculosis in 1913. Alfred adopted Theodora's two sons, and the couple had two more children together, literary scholar Karl Kroeber and the celebrated science-fiction writer Ursula Kroeber Le Guin. They remained married until Alfred's death in 1960: the marriage was described in Theodora's obituary as a successful one. Theodora began writing seriously after her husband had retired and her children were grown, at approximately the same time that Ursula also began writing professionally. In 1959 she published The Inland Whale, a retelling of California Native American legends, Three years later she published Ishi in Two Worlds, a biography of Ishi, the last of the Yahi people, which became her best known work. She also edited a collection of Alfred's essays, titled An Anthropologist Looks at History (1963). Theodora began a biography of Alfred after his death, but struggled to complete it until her marriage in 1969 to artist John Quinn. Quinn encouraged her to complete the book, which was published in 1970 by the University of California Press. Theodora originally pictured the volume as a "series of biographical notes", but felt during the writing process that she needed to produce a cohesive document. The term "configuration" in the title refers to Alfred's exploration of cultural change in his work. In his view, history moved in "impersonal cycles" that individuals were constrained by even when they impacted society; he came to believe that his own life had, despite the effect of random events, eventually turned into a "relatively consistent fabric".

== Summary ==
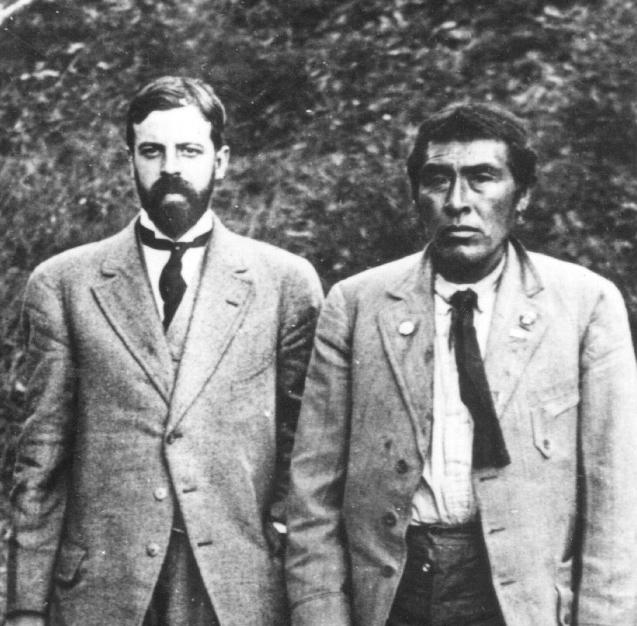
Alfred Kroeber and Ishi, pictured in 1911.

The book begins by narrating Alfred Kroeber's childhood in New York, where his family moved soon after he was born in Hoboken, New Jersey. It moves chronologically through his childhood and education: he enrolled at Columbia University in 1892, when he was 16 years old. His education there focused on English literature, in which he received Bachelor's and Master's degrees, before he was introduced to anthropology and began studying it under Franz Boas. He studied dialects among the Eskimo, and worked in Wyoming on "decorative symbolism of the Arapaho" during his PhD work. He was briefly employed by the California Academy of Sciences as a curator, before he was fired: according to the academy, Kroeber's position, which involved paid field work, was too expensive to maintain. Kroeber endured personal tragedy, with the deaths from tuberculosis of Henriette Rothschild, his wife of five years, in 1913, and his friend Ishi in 1916. Kroeber himself suffered from Ménière's disease, though he experienced its symptoms for many years before it was diagnosed. The book also narrates his experiments with psychoanalysis in the years following his first wife's death. Having described Alfred's personal life up to and including his marriage to Theodora, the book backtracks in time to 1901 to examine his professional development in more detail. After a brief period in New York, Kroeber was employed by the University of California Museum of Anthropology in Berkeley, California, and tasked with putting its collections in order. In the early 1900s Kroeber spent extensive periods doing field work, and oversaw the Museum, which opened to the public in 1911.

Approximately half the book discusses Alfred Kroeber's life after his marriage to Theodora. In this period Alfred undertook a variety of ethnographic work, including field work in Mexico and Peru. He was offered the professorship at Columbia that had been held by his mentor Boas, which he turned down. He participated in the Army Specialized Training Program during World War II, which is described as a "highly rewarding challenge". Alfred experienced a heart attack during the last years of the war, and retired soon after. In retirement he taught as a guest lecturer at various universities, including Harvard, Brandeis, Yale, and the University of Chicago. He participated as a witness in the Indians of California v. United States legal case. The biography ends with Alfred's death in Paris, after a trip to Vienna. It touches at various points on his relationship with his children, and discusses his deep love of music. The book briefly covers Theodora's own autobiography.

== Reception ==
Theodora's "unique qualifications" to write Alfred's biography were mentioned in reviews in Science and the American Anthropologist. Scholar Timothy Thoresen commented that the book's strength was its "warm portrait of a distinguished anthropologist", but its limitations were related, and the consequence of the author's closeness to her subject. Thoresen wrote that the book glossed "too quickly" over some aspects of Alfred's life, especially in the period before their marriage. A 2012 analysis of Alfred's psychoanalytic period commented that Theodora's chronology was sometimes inaccurate, particularly before their marriage, and noted that the book did largely did not document its assertions. Multiple reviewers commented that the biography shed light on the warmth of Alfred's familiar relationships and his long and happy marriage to Theodora. Scholar Regna Darnell wrote that biographies written by women of their husbands were "often embarrassing", but that this one was a "welcome and refreshing exception" that achieved Theodora's stated goal of being "personal but not intimate".

Multiple reviewers noted that Theodora's stated intention was to "[leave] the measure of the anthropologist" to others. Anthropologist George W. Stocking Jr., writing in the American Historical Review argued that the book's value was in the rich anecdotal portrait offered of Alfred, and that portions of it illuminated the biography of an anthropologist who dominated his profession for a period: but that it had deficiencies as an "intellectual biography", a view shared by Thoresen. Thoresen wrote that the book did not examine in sufficient detail Alfred's presidency of the American Anthropological Association, and participation in fierce debates within his profession about the influence of biological inheritance and environment.David G. Mandelbaum, a cultural anthropologist and former colleague of Alfred, stated that this biography was just as important a work from an anthropologist's perspective as Ishi in Two Worlds. A review in Science similarly wrote that the biography provided a "meaningful addition to the history of anthropology" to readers unfamiliar with Alfred's work. The reviewer praised Theodora's decision to leave out "amusing or bizarre trivia" that may have enhanced the book's appeal to general readers, and said it provided a useful account of Alfred's intellectual development.

Theodora Kroeber's writing was universally praised. Stocking commented that her "gift for [evocative] and moving descriptive writing" was frequently evident. Thoresen called the book "well-written": the American Anthropologist also praised Theodora's writing, calling it "vivid and readable". Scholar Grace Buzaljko called it a "sensitive biography with her inimitable phraseology and setting of mood", while anthropologist Joel Bernstein similarly commented that Kroeber had written with the same sensitivity she brought to Ishi in Two Worlds. A review in the Pacific Historical Review praised the book, noting that it was "distilled rather than encyclopedic" and praising its writing as "intriguing and evocative of a remarkable human being". A review in the California Historical Quarterly was wholly positive, writing that the book could be "enthusiastically recommended" to both anthropologists and general readers, and particularly praising Theodora's "charming accounts" of the couple's married life and field trips together. Cultural anthropologist Cora Du Bois commented that while Theodora "[made] no claim to having written [Alfred's] intellectual history", her book would be essential to anyone who did, adding that it was written with "felicity, restraint, and objectivity".
