= Ishi in Two Worlds =

Biography of the Native American Yahi called Ishi

- Author: Theodora Kroeber
- Language: English
- Publisher: University of California Press
- Publication date: 1961
- Dewey Decimal: 970.3
- LC Class: E90.I8 K7

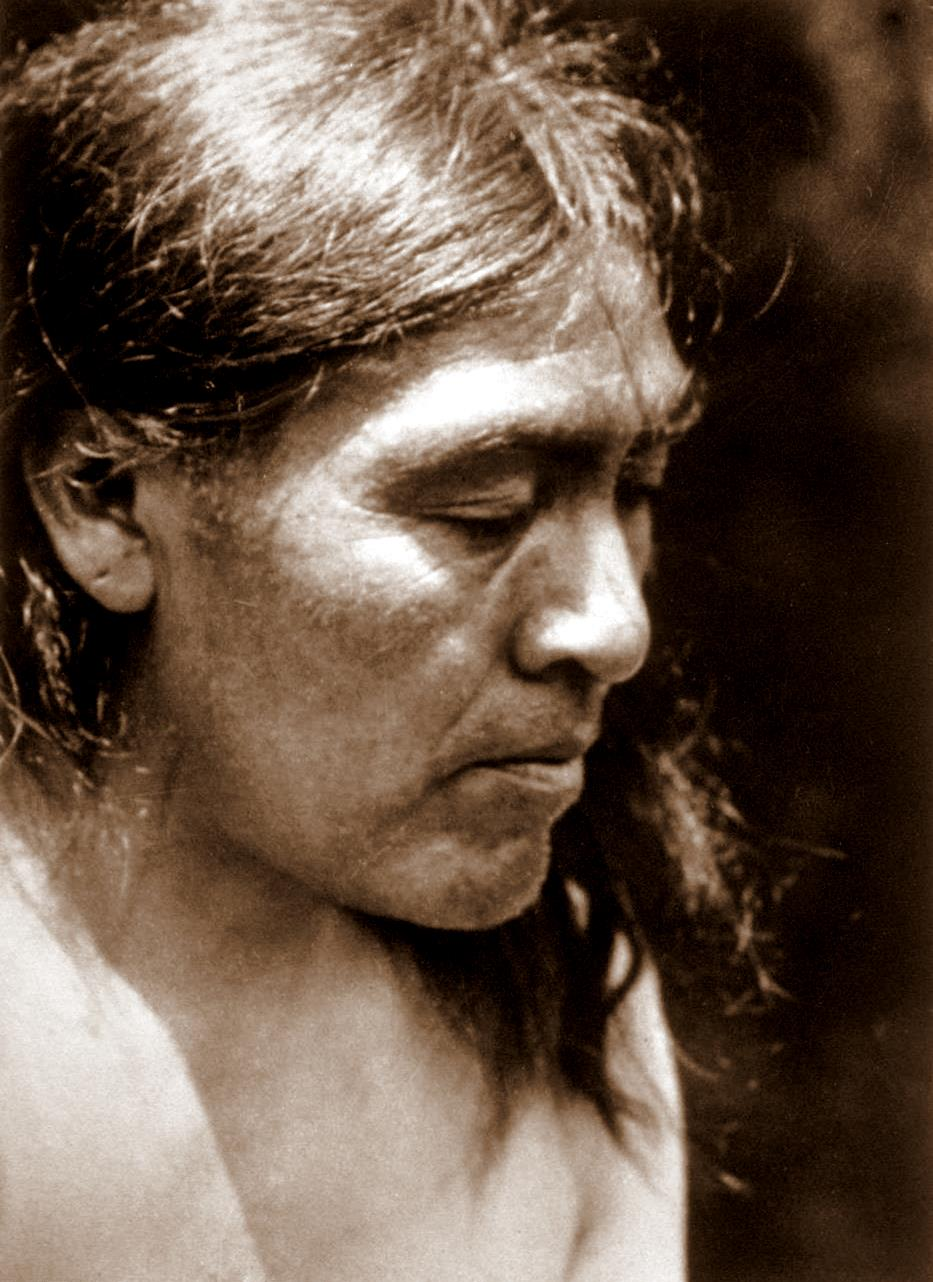
Ishi, the subject of Ishi in Two Worlds

Ishi in Two Worlds is a biographical account of Ishi, the last known member of the Yahi Native American people. Written by American author Theodora Kroeber, it was first published in 1961. Ishi had been found alone and starving outside Oroville, California, in 1911. He was befriended by the anthropologists Alfred Louis Kroeber and Thomas Waterman, who took him to the Museum of Anthropology in San Francisco. There, he was studied by the anthropologists, before his death in 1916. Theodora Kroeber married Alfred Kroeber in 1926. Though she had never met Ishi, she decided to write a biography of him because her husband did not feel able to do so.

Ishi in Two Worlds was published in 1961, after Theodora Kroeber had spent two years studying the sources about him. It sold widely, remained in print for many years, and was translated into more than a dozen languages. The book was twice adapted into film, in 1978 (as Ishi: The Last of His Tribe) and 1992 (as The Last of His Tribe). It was highly praised by reviewers, who commended Kroeber's writing and her ability to evoke the Yahi culture. A 2013 biography of Theodora Kroeber wrote that she had a talent for "making us part of a life we never took part in", while scholar James Clifford stated that the book "wrapped up Ishi's story in a humane, angry, lovely, bittersweet package."

== Background and writing ==
Ishi, believed to have been born between 1860 and 1862, was a member of the Yahi people, a subgroup of the Yana, a Native American tribe. The Yahi lived near the foothills of Mount Lassen for several thousand years before the arrival of white settlers. Most of the Yahi were killed by settler militia in the early 1800s. The number of Yahi living near their ancestral home shrank rapidly, and in 1872 they were believed to have gone extinct. A tiny settlement inhabited by Ishi, his elderly mother, and two others was found by some surveyors in 1908, who then looted the village. Two of the Native Americans fled, and were never heard of again. Ishi's mother was left unharmed, but died soon after. Ishi lived alone for three years until he was found half-starved in a cattle corral near Oroville, California in August 1911.

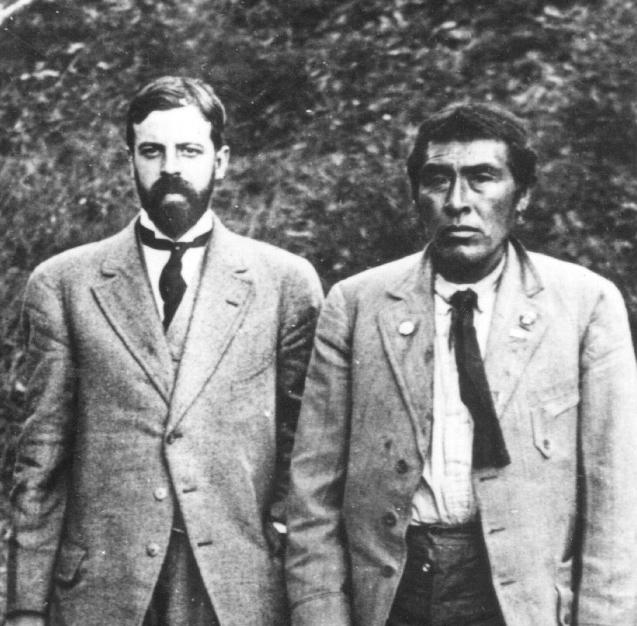
1911 photograph of Alfred Kroeber and Ishi

Ishi was initially imprisoned by the local sheriff. Alfred Louis Kroeber and Thomas Waterman, two anthropologists at the University of California, Berkeley, heard of his imprisonment, visited him, determined that he was a member of the Yahi tribe, and had him released to Waterman's custody. They took him to the University of California's Museum of Anthropology, where he was given a job as a janitor and a place to live. He was given the name "Ishi", meaning "man" in the Yana language, by Kroeber as a practical necessity; he was forbidden to say his own name by a traditional taboo, and his original name was never discovered. Ishi was described in the media as the "last wild man in the West", and became an object of public curiosity. He was befriended and studied by Kroeber, Waterman, and Saxton Pope, a physiologist at the University Medical School in San Francisco. Five years after he was found in Oroville, Ishi died of tuberculosis.

The biographical account Ishi in Two Worlds was written by Theodora Kroeber. Theodora had married Alfred Kroeber in 1926, and had never met Ishi. Kroeber, whose academic background was in psychology and anthropology, did not start writing seriously until the late 1950s, when her four children had grown up. In 1959, she began studying the academic literature about Ishi. She stated that she took on the task of writing the biography because her husband found the subject too painful to write a book about. Alfred Kroeber was a major source for the material in the book, but died in 1960, a year before it was published in 1961.

== Synopsis ==
The book is divided into two parts. The first, titled "Ishi the Yahi", describes the history and the culture of the Yahi people, while the second, titled "Mister Ishi", discusses his life at the museum. Each part has its own prolog: the first describes how Ishi was found in Oroville, his imprisonment, and the efforts of the anthropologists to get him released into their custody. The second describes his release, as he was being taken to the museum in San Francisco.

The first part begins with the history of California before European colonization, and describes the territory of the Yana people, within which the Yahi inhabited the southern region. Kroeber suggests that the Yahi were never numerous, and probably never numbered over 3,000. She writes that though they once occupied a large section of the Sacramento Valley, they were likely pushed into the hills by invasions of other, more numerous, Native American peoples. The first section also describes the Yahi language, and the landscape of their territory near Mount Lassen.

Multiple chapters in the first section focus on the destruction of the Yahi by white settlers. The Yahi territory began to be affected when the Mexican government of Alta California made land grants to settlers in the Yahi lands in the 1840s: most of these grants were later confirmed by the US government. The California Gold Rush began soon afterward, bringing huge numbers of settlers into the region. Fierce military conflicts followed, leading to the destruction of the local Native American peoples over the next few decades, until eventually only a small band were left to found the settlement where settlers encountered them in 1908.

The second part of the book begins with a history of the museum in San Francisco to which Ishi was taken, and a narration of how he came to be called Ishi. At the museum, Alfred Kroeber and others arranged for weekly public interactions, at which Ishi would usually demonstrate stringing a bow, or making fire with a fire drill. Eventually Ishi's friends were obliged to arrange for Ishi to be employed as a janitor, to enable the university to fund his upkeep. In addition to Kroeber, Waterman and Pope, Ishi befriended other Native American friends of the anthropologists, such as Juan Dolores, a Tohono O'odham Indian. Ishi spent much of his time at the museum crafting tools and weapons. He was also frequently taken hunting by his friends. The final chapter of the book tells of Ishi developing a tuberculosis infection in late 1914, and his death from the disease soon afterwards.

== Publication and adaptation ==
In 1964, three years after the publication of Ishi in Two Worlds, Kroeber published a version of the story for children titled Ishi, Last of His Tribe. While the original had been published by Berkley Books, the children's volume was published by Parnassus Press, and illustrated by Ruth Robbins. Kroeber stated that she found it difficult to write the book because of its tragic subject matter, saying she was "very late in coming to any pleasure from it". She found the children's version even more difficult, as she struggled to present death to an audience largely shielded from it. A new edition issued in 1976 included new color photographs, as well as higher-quality prints of some of the 32 black and white images in the original. The dimensions of the book were also increased. The book was twice adapted for the screen, as Ishi: The Last of His Tribe in 1978, and as The Last of His Tribe in 1992. An anthology about Ishi and his relationship with Alfred Kroeber, coedited by the Kroebers' sons Karl and Clifton, was released in 2013.

== Reception and analysis ==
Ishi in Two Worlds became an immediate success, selling widely and earning high praise from reviewers. Described as a classic, it was translated into more than a dozen languages, and established Kroeber's reputation for anthropological writing. It had sold half a million copies by 1976, and a million copies by 2001, at which point it was still in print. Scholar Albert Elsasser, reviewing the 1976 edition, said that there was "something extraordinarily compelling about Theodora Kroeber's elegant prose", and that the addition of higher quality photographs had created a volume of "an impressive and subtle alchemy". A 1989 biography of Kroeber again praised her writing, saying that she had a talent for "making us part of a life we never took part in, of allowing our presence where we never were, of raising up a gone world." In contrast, scholar Augie Fleras wrote in 2006 that she found the book "slow", and said that it often romanticized and even stereotyped Ishi, occasionally "[lapsing] into a treacly sentimentality".

Elsasser praised the book again in a 1979 obituary for Kroeber, calling Ishi in Two Worlds the most widely read book about a Native American subject, and said it was a "beautifully written story" that was "evocative of Yahi culture". Another obituary stated that Ishi in Two Worlds had probably been read by more people than had ever read Alfred Kroeber's works. A scholarly review published in 1962 described as a "unique and vividly written account", and commented that it was accessible to both scientists and laypeople. Writing in 2010, scholar Douglas Cazaux Sackman compared Ishi in Two Worlds to To Kill a Mockingbird, and stated that it spoke to the experiences of Native Americans in its exploration of "the dark side of American expansion and the legacy of genocidal policies" in the same way that Harper Lee's book, published the previous year, examined racial prejudice and the legacy of slavery in the experience of African Americans. Sackman stated that Ishi in Two Worlds "struck a chord" with its audience, and inspired greater interest in both Native American and environmental causes. Scholar Thomas E. Simmons wrote that the book's perspective on Ishi was "empathetic yet deeply flawed", saying that it glossed over or did not take issue with the manner in which Ishi was presented as an exhibit. Scholar Richard Pascal wrote that the book, "to its credit", did not evade the "horrors inflicted upon the Yahi by the invading whites". However, he argued that the narrative's goal is one of assimilation, and said it was "colonizing 'Ishi' in the name of American culture.

Scholar James Clifford wrote in 2013 that the account of Ishi's life in San Francisco was "absorbing", and written with "skill and compassion". Clifford noted that Ishi in Two Worlds contained a few factual mistakes, and that scholars had over time criticized some of the emphases placed by Kroeber. Additionally, he argued that Kroeber's writing challenged some stereotypes of Native Americans, but it also demonstrated others. Kroeber, possibly influenced by her knowledge of the brutalities perpetrated by Western nations during World War II and its aftermath, was "uncompromising" in describing the systematic killing of Native Americans in California. However, Clifford criticized the implicit assumption that coming into the care of Alfred Kroeber was the best outcome for Ishi; other alternatives, such as settling him with other Native American peoples from the region, were not considered. Nonetheless, he said that "[w]ith a generous appreciation of human complexity and an eye for the telling detail, Theodora Kroeber, a novice author, created a masterpiece". Ishi in Two Worlds "wrapped up Ishi's story in a humane, angry, lovely, bittersweet package", which remained the most detailed and complete account of Ishi's life.

== Sources ==
- Buzaljko, Grace Wilson (1989). "Theodora Kracaw Kroeber". In Ute Gacs; Aisha Khan; Jerrie McIntyre; Ruth Weinberg (eds.). Women Anthropologists: Selected Biographies (Reprint ed.). University of Illinois Press. ISBN 0-252-06084-9.
- Clifford, James (2013). Returns: Becoming Indigenous in the 21st Century. Harvard University Press. ISBN 9780674727281.
- Kroeber, Theodora (1961). Ishi in Two Worlds. University of California Press. ISBN 0-520-00675-5.
