= Kroeber =

Kroeber or Kröber may refer to:

- Alfred L. Kroeber (1876–1960), U.S. anthropologist
- Karl Kroeber (1926–2009), U.S. professor of literature
- Martin Kröber (born 1992), German politician for the SPD
- Otto Kröber (1882–1969), German entomologist specialising in Diptera
- Theodora Kroeber (1897–1979), U.S. writer and anthropologist
- Ursula Kroeber Le Guin (1929–2017), U.S. author, daughter of Alfred L. Kroeber
