= Ishi Wilderness =

Protected wilderness area in California, United States

- IUCN category Ib (wilderness area)
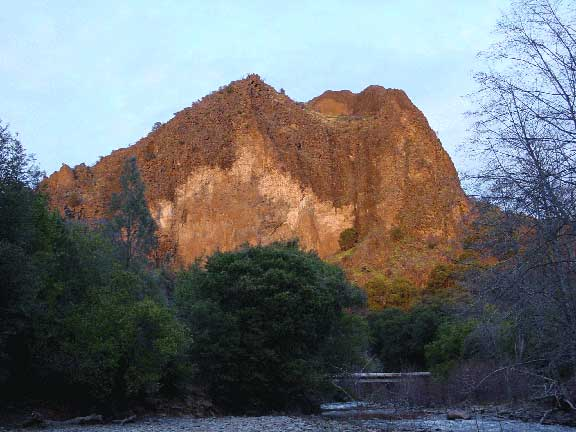
- Black Rock with Mill Creek in foreground

- Location within California Location within the United States
- Interactive map of Ishi Wilderness
- Location: Tehama County, California, Sierra/Cascade region
- Nearest city: Red Bluff
- Coordinates: 40°08′05″N 121°45′19″W
- Area: 41,339 acres (167.29 km^{2})
- Established: 1984
- Governing body: U.S. Forest Service and Bureau of Land Management

The Ishi Wilderness is a 41,339 acre (167 km2) wilderness area located on the Lassen National Forest in the Shasta Cascade foothills of northern California, United States. The Ishi Wilderness is located approximately 20 miles (32 km) east of Red Bluff. The wilderness was created when the US Congress passed the California Wilderness Act of 1984. The land is etched by wind and water, and dotted with basalt outcroppings, caves, and unusual pillar lava formations. The land is a series of east-west running ridges framing rugged river canyons, with the highest ridges attaining elevations of 4,000 feet (1,200 m). Deer Creek and Mill Creek are the principal drainages and flow into the Sacramento River.

The Ishi Wilderness is the only protected area in California that preserves a significant portion of the Sierra/Cascade foothill region of the southernmost Cascade Ranges.

Almost the entire wilderness area was burned down by the Park Fire in mid-2024.

== Yana Indian ==
Ishi is the name given by anthropologist Alfred L. Kroeber to the last surviving Native American from the Yahi Yana tribe. The Yahi Yana tribe had lived in the area for over three thousand years. Sometime after 1850, white settlers moving into the area killed all but a few of the Yahi. A few escaped and hid for years in the harsh wild country.

== Flora and fauna ==
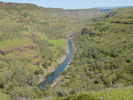
Mill Creek

The sun-baked south slopes are covered with chaparral brush. Pines and oaks thrive on the moister slopes facing north and lush damp forests line the river banks. This area is home to pine clusters, dense areas of ponderosa pine growing on terraces in river cut canyons.

The largest migratory deer herd in California, the Tehama deer herd, winters in this wilderness area. Wild hogs, mountain lions, black bears, coyotes, bobcats and rabbits also live here. A State Game Refuge, where hunting is not permitted, occupies most of the Ishi Wilderness.

A variety of raptors including hawks, eagles, falcons, and owls nest in the rock cliffs. Wild turkey, quail, mourning doves, canyon wrens, band-tailed pigeons, and many songbirds are frequently seen.

== Access ==
The US Forest Service reminds visitors to the Wilderness to respect the record of the Yahi Yana Indians. All archaeological and historical sites and artifacts are protected by federal law and should not be disturbed.

The Leave No Trace principles of wilderness travel are highly encouraged also by both the Forest Service and the Bureau of Land Management (the BLM manages a small portion of the wilderness-240 acres (97 ha).)

Special fishing regulations are in effect for fishing in Deer and Mill Creeks, home to many fish species. A valid California fishing license is required.

== See also ==
- Shasta Cascade
- Traditional narratives (Native California)
