= Theodora Kroeber =

American anthropologist (1897–1979)

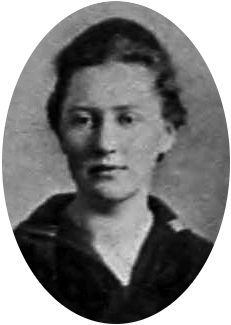
- Kroeber in 1919
- Born: Theodora Covel Kracaw; March 24, 1897; Denver, Colorado, U.S.
- Died: July 4, 1979 (aged 82); Berkeley, California, U.S.
- Education: University of California, Berkeley
- Occupations: Writer; psychologist; anthropologist
- Spouses: Clifton Brown (m. 1920; died 1923) Alfred Kroeber (m. 1926; died 1960) John Quinn (m. 1969)
- Children: 4, including Karl and Ursula

Theodora Kroeber (/ˈkroʊbər/ KROH-bər; née Theodora Covel Kracaw; (Note: Theodora Kroeber was born Theodora Covel Kracaw. She published her 1926 paper, written after her marriage to Clifton Brown, as Theodora Kracaw Brown. Her writing after her second marriage was published as Theodora Kroeber, and she was known at the time of her death as Theodora Kroeber-Quinn.) March 24, 1897 – July 4, 1979) was an American writer and anthropologist, best known for her accounts of several Native Californian cultures. Born in Denver, Colorado, Kroeber grew up in the mining town of Telluride, and worked briefly as a nurse. She attended the University of California, Berkeley (UC Berkeley), for her undergraduate studies, graduating with a major in psychology in 1919, and received a master's degree from the same institution in 1920.

Married in 1920 and widowed in 1923, she began doctoral studies in anthropology at UC Berkeley. She met anthropologist Alfred Louis Kroeber during her studies, and married him in 1926. One of her two children with Kroeber was the writer Ursula K. Le Guin. The Kroebers traveled together to many of Alfred's field sites, including an archaeological dig in Peru, where Theodora worked cataloging specimens. On their return, Alfred encouraged Theodora to continue her graduate work, but she declined, feeling she had too many responsibilities.

Kroeber began writing professionally late in her life, after her children had grown up. She published The Inland Whale, a collection of translated Native Californian narratives in 1959. Two years later she published Ishi in Two Worlds, an account of Ishi, the last member of the Yahi people of Northern California, whom Alfred Kroeber had befriended and studied between 1911 and 1916. This volume sold widely and received high praise from contemporary reviewers. Retrospective reviews were more mixed, noting Kroeber's unflinching portrayal of Californian colonization but criticizing her perspective on Ishi's treatment.

Nine years after Alfred's death in 1960, Theodora Kroeber married artist John Quinn. Kroeber published several other works in her later years, including a collaboration with her daughter Ursula and a biography of Alfred Kroeber. She served as a regent of the University of California for a year before her death in 1979. She has been described as having influenced her husband's anthropological work, and as having inspired interest in indigenous culture through Ishi in Two Worlds. A 1989 biography stated that her "great strength was as an interpreter of one culture to another".

== Early life, education, and first marriage ==
Theodora Covel Kracaw was born on March 24, 1897, in Denver, Colorado, and lived there for her first four years. She grew up in the mining town of Telluride, where her parents, Phebe Jane (née Johnston) and Charles Emmett Kracaw, owned a general store. Charles's family were recent Polish migrants and Phebe had grown up in Wyoming. Theodora was the youngest of three Kracaw children; she had two brothers, five and ten years older than she was. All the children attended schools in Telluride. Theodora's brothers became physicians. Theodora, who described herself as a shy and introverted person, said her childhood was happy. Her family name "Kracaw" led to her being nicknamed "Krakie" by her friends.

Kracaw graduated in 1915 as the valedictorian of her class at Telluride High School. After graduation, she worked as a volunteer nurse at Hadley Hospital in Colorado. In the same year, the family left Colorado and moved to Orland, California, since the lower altitude there was expected to benefit her father's health, although it failed to do so. (Note: Her father built one of the largest general merchandise businesses in Orland and became president of the local chamber of commerce. In November 1917, because of failing eyesight, a complication of Bright's disease, he sold his business. He died by suicide the following June. Buzaljko states that her father suffered setbacks in his business, and facing both blindness and tuberculosis, he died by suicide in 1917.) Kracaw enrolled at the University of California, Berkeley (UC Berkeley), in 1915. She considered majoring in economics or English literature before deciding on psychology. She made lifelong friends during her undergraduate years, including Jean Macfarlane, whose interest in psychology drove Kracaw to select that discipline for her major. She graduated cum laude in 1919 with a BA in psychology and began graduate study at UC Berkeley. Her master's thesis studied ten families in San Francisco whose children were involved with a juvenile court. She volunteered as a probation officer and was required to meet and report on the families she was studying. She later wrote that she struggled to be objective in writing about these families. Kracaw received her master's degree in clinical psychology in 1920.

In the summer of 1920, Kracaw married Clifton Spencer Brown, who was at UC Berkeley for graduate studies in law. Brown was contending with the effects of pneumonia he had contracted in France during World War I. They had two children, Clifton II and Theodore. The couple were visiting in Santa Fe when their home was lost in the 1923 Berkeley fire. Clifton left to return to Berkeley, but died en route in Denver in October 1923. Theodora and the children made their way back to Berkeley and the home of Brown's widowed mother, who encouraged her to return to graduate school. While in Santa Fe, she had developed an interest in Native American art and culture, and she decided to study anthropology at UC Berkeley.

== Anthropological career and second marriage ==
Theodora re-entered university in 1924. Having chosen to study anthropology, she consulted Alfred Kroeber, a leading American anthropologist of his generation and the head of the UC Berkeley anthropology department. Although she had previously taken classes from Alfred's assistant Thomas Waterman, this was the first time Theodora met Alfred. At the time, anthropology was a new field and although women were admitted to help bolster class sizes to legitimize course offerings, they were resented. (Note: Author Virginia Kerns noted that classes in anthropology were so small at this time that the courses were in danger of being eliminated from the offerings. By increasing enrollment, the department was able to prevent courses from being removed and to expand the curricula.) Male colleagues worried that women would be competition for the limited employment posts or research grants and lower the prestige of the profession. Thus, it became typical for women to be recruited, but their training and employment opportunities thereafter were restricted. During a seminar class Theodora took with Alfred, she and Julian Steward were assigned to evaluate Native American sport activities. She also took a course on symbolism with Robert Lowie.

Theodora and Alfred married on March 26, 1926. Steward, then also a graduate student at UC Berkeley, wrote that the marriage surprised their colleagues. Alfred, 21 years older than Theodora, had also been previously married; his wife had died of tuberculosis in 1913. Alfred adopted Theodora's two sons, giving them his last name. The couple had two more children together: Karl and Ursula. Karl, Clifton, and Theodore later became professors, of English, history, and psychology, respectively, and Ursula became a well-known author under her married name Ursula K. Le Guin. In June 1926, the Kroebers left their children with Theodora's mother and went on an eight-month field trip to an archaeological dig in Peru's Nazca valley. It was Theodora's first visit to an archaeological site; she also had not previously lived on a campsite. While there, she worked on recognizing and cataloging specimens. Also in 1926, she published her first academic work, a paper examining ethnological data analysis, in the journal The American Anthropologist. She accompanied Alfred on another trip to Peru in 1942 and other trips studying the Yurok and Mohave peoples, including to the Klamath River. She drew on these experiences in her 1968 book Almost Ancestors.

On their return from Peru, Alfred encouraged Theodora to continue working on her doctorate, but she declined, as she felt she had too many responsibilities. When they were not traveling, the Kroebers spent most of the year in a large redwood house, facing San Francisco Bay, to which Alfred was particularly attached. They both lived in the same house until their deaths. The redwood house has been described as the cornerstone of the Kroebers' lengthy marriage. They spent the summers in an old farmhouse they had bought in the Napa Valley on a 40-acre ranch named "Kishamish". Alfred's friends among the Native Americans were frequent visitors to this house. During the academic year, Theodora kept in contact with Alfred's academic acquaintances when the couple entertained them at their house in Berkeley.

== Writing career ==
My tentative guess is that the budding, creating element in oral literature may well lie within the unique tale, invented by a single person, and tangential to the great, conventionalized, and channeled main stream of a people's literary corpus and tradition.

— Theodora Kroeber, discussing The Inland Whale (1959)

Kroeber began writing seriously once again after her husband had retired and her children were all grown, at approximately the same time that Ursula also began writing professionally. Between 1955 and 1956, a year the Kroebers spent at Stanford University, Theodora wrote a novel about Telluride. This work was never published, but helped her establish a habit of writing a little bit every day. In 1959, the year she turned 62, she published The Inland Whale, a retelling of California Native American legends that she had selected in the belief that they exhibited a certain originality. The book collected nine pieces that shared a theme of heroines: a section of authorial commentary was also included. One of these was a Yurok legend narrated to her by the Yurok Robert Spott, who had been among the visitors to Kishamish. The book was well-received, with critics identifying it as a notable work of comparative literature. One reviewer said Kroeber had made the legends accessible to a general audience by "translating freely in her own sensitive, almost lyrical style".

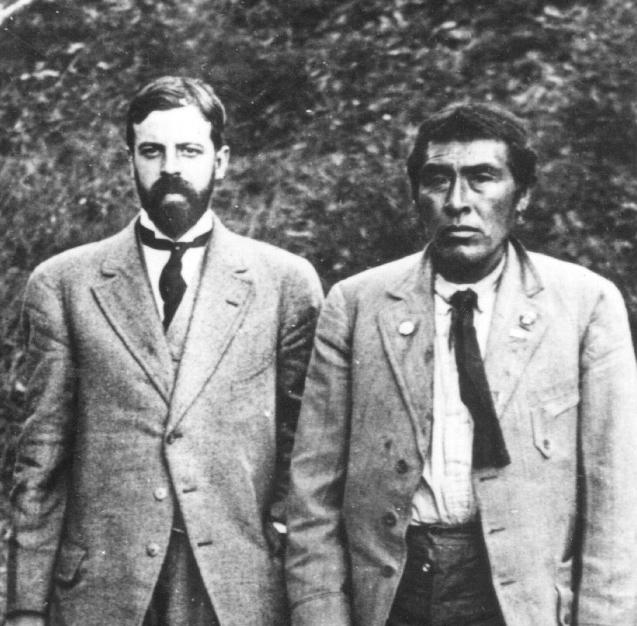
Alfred Kroeber (left) and Ishi, pictured in 1911

=== Ishi ===
Kroeber spent 1960 and 1961 exploring the literature about Ishi, the last known member of the Yahi people, who had been found starving in Oroville, California, in 1911. Ishi had been brought to UC Berkeley, where he was studied and befriended by Alfred Kroeber and his associates. Ishi never shared his Yahi name; Alfred suggested to reporters that he be called "Ishi", which meant "man" in the language of the Yana people, of which the Yahi were a subgroup. Ishi had died of tuberculosis in 1916. Theodora undertook to write an account of his life, believing that Alfred could not bring himself to do so. Ishi in Two Worlds was published in 1961, a year after Alfred's death. Kroeber found the book's challenging subject material to be difficult to write, as it recounted the extermination of the Yahi people as part of the California genocide and Ishi's many years spent largely in solitude. She released a version of the story for children in 1964 titled Ishi: Last of His Tribe. She found this version even harder to write, as she struggled to present death to an audience largely shielded from it. This version was illustrated by Ruth Robbins: a review noted it was not another anthropological study, but discussed in simple language the cultural clashes which resulted from the Western expansion of the United States.

Ishi in Two Worlds became an immediate success and established Kroeber's reputation for anthropological writing. Described as a "modern classic", it was translated into nine languages and remained in print as of 2015. It sold half a million copies by 1976 and a million copies by 2001. The book generally received high praise upon publication: one reviewer said Kroeber had a talent for "making us part of a life we never took part in". A 1979 commentary described it as the most widely read book about a Native American subject, calling it a "beautifully written story" that was "evocative of Yahi culture". The story was adapted as a television film as Ishi: The Last of His Tribe in 1978, and as The Last of His Tribe in 1992.

Retrospective assessments of the book are more mixed. Thomas E. Simmons, a justice of the Rosebud Sioux Tribe, wrote in 2019 that the book's perspective on Ishi was "empathetic yet deeply flawed", saying that it glossed over or did not take issue with the manner in which Ishi was presented as an exhibit. Writing in 1997, scholar Richard Pascal said the book, "to its credit", did not evade the "horrors inflicted upon the Yahi by the invading whites", an opinion echoed by historian James Clifford in 2013. Pascal nonetheless argued that the narrative's goal was one of assimilation, and said it was "colonizing 'Ishi' in the name of American culture", and Clifford criticized the implicit assumption that coming into the care of Alfred Kroeber was the best outcome for Ishi.

Kroeber's style continued to receive praise. Writing in 2010, historian Douglas Sackman compared Ishi in Two Worlds to To Kill a Mockingbird, and stated that it spoke to the experiences of Native Americans in its exploration of "the dark side of American expansion and the legacy of genocidal policies" in the same way that Harper Lee's book, published the previous year, examined racial prejudice and the legacy of slavery in the experience of African Americans. Clifford wrote that the account of Ishi's life in San Francisco was written with "skill and compassion", and added that "[w]ith a generous appreciation of human complexity and an eye for the telling detail, [Kroeber] created a masterpiece". Ishi in Two Worlds "wrapped up Ishi's story in a humane, angry, lovely, bittersweet package", which remained the most detailed and complete account of Ishi's life.

=== Later writing ===
Theodora published two papers in 1969, "Shropshire Revisited" and "Life Against Death in English Poetry: A Method of Stylistic Definition", which she had written previously with Alfred. These both examined literary style in English poetry. Grace Buzaljko, editor for the UC Berkeley Department of Anthropology and subsequently author of a short biography of Theodora, described both Kroebers as "superb stylists", Theodora having an inclination towards the "personal and intense", which also made her anthropological writing accessible and enjoyable for a wide audience. Theodora edited Alfred's An Anthropologist Looks at History (1963), wrote the forewords to two collections of Alfred's writings which were unpublished until after his death, Yurok Myths (1976) and Karok Myths (1980), and collaborated with her daughter on Tillai and Tylissos, a poetry collection released in 1979. She also wrote a biography of her husband titled Alfred Kroeber: A Personal Configuration, published in 1970 by the University of California Press. It was widely praised by reviewers: Anthropologist George W. Stocking Jr. wrote that her "gift for [evocative] and moving descriptive writing" was frequently evident, and Buzaljko called it a "sensitive biography with her inimitable phraseology and setting of mood". David G. Mandelbaum, a cultural anthropologist and former colleague of Alfred, stated that this biography was just as important a work from an anthropologist's perspective as Ishi in Two Worlds. Reviews also discussed the biography's illumination of Kroeber's academic development and called it a work of value to anthropologists; others found it wanting as a scholarly biography.

Kroeber published several other works in the years that followed, including a short story and two novels along with her anthropological writings. After completing Ishi: Last of His Tribe, she collaborated with Robert Heizer, an anthropologist at UC Berkeley, to publish two pictorial accounts of Native Americans in California: Almost Ancestors, released in 1968, and Drawn from Life, released in 1976. These books collected images from several sources with text written by Kroeber, and were described by the American Anthropologist as examining social change among California's Indian peoples in a literary style that was Kroeber's own. Kroeber notes that the images included therein were poor, but defended their publication, writing "Why offer so flawed and partial a record? It is all the record there is ... We believe you will see through the pictures, imperfect as they are, to the living human beings who sat for them." Anthropologist Lowell Bean expressed disappointment in the quality of the illustrations, and wrote that the essays were "oversimplified", but nonetheless found value in the illustrations, and commended the authors for "painstaking efforts".

Theodora Kroeber, photographed in 1970

== Later life ==
On December 14, 1969, Kroeber married John Quinn, who was working at the time for the Sierra Club. Quinn had been one of the editors for Almost Ancestors. Quinn, an artist and psychotherapist, was several decades younger than Kroeber. She reflected on the impact of age gaps within marriage in a 1976 essay, using her own experience of having been much younger than her second husband and older than her third husband. After their marriage, the couple moved into Theodora's home on Arch Street in Berkeley. They also designed and built a home known as Quinnwood in Anchor Bay, California, where they lived part-time until 1978. Quinn encouraged her to complete her biography of Alfred, which she was having trouble with when she had met Quinn. Ten years later, when Kroeber's health was declining, Quinn encouraged her to write a short autobiography, which was printed privately after her death.

Kroeber described her political views as those of an "old thirties liberal". She was a lifelong supporter of the Democratic Party and a participant in peace rallies in her final years. In 1977 she was offered a position on the University of California Board of Regents by California Governor Jerry Brown. She held the position for a year before she resigned, stating that the position was exhausting her. Her last act in that position was to send a memorandum to the rest of the board, challenging the University's involvement in research into nuclear weapons, and stating that the board had an "unblushing commitment ... to the development of science and the practice of war, of human and earth destruction". On July 4, 1979, she died of cancer in her Berkeley home.

== Legacy ==
Berkeley anthropologist Albert Elsasser, writing an obituary of Kroeber in the American Anthropologist, described her as a pioneer of statistical analyses of cultural relationships in Polynesia, which she had analyzed in her 1926 paper. Her husband Alfred Kroeber later expanded upon those methods in his work on indigenous peoples in California. Elsasser wrote that Kroeber did not have an inclination for "any discipline that stressed dry prose or statistics", and notes that it was not clear whether she wished to pursue a career in academia. Kroeber said she had no ambition "in the public sense of ambition", and expressed no dissatisfaction at having left her graduate work. According to Elsasser, Kroeber had instead an appreciation for the "aesthetic implications of [Alfred Kroeber's] work with Indians", and he writes that manner of interacting with people likely had an influence on her husband's work. UC Berkeley conducted an oral history with Kroeber in 1982.

Kroeber's writing was nonetheless widely influential. Critics wrote of The Inland Whale that Kroeber had broken ground in getting oral traditions recognized for their literary worth. A 1980 obituary stated that Ishi in Two Worlds had probably been read by more people than had ever read Alfred Kroeber's works. Sackman wrote that the book inspired greater interest in both Native American and environmental causes, and a 2002 commentary argued that had it not been for Kroeber's book, Ishi's story would never have come to wider attention. It has also been described as influencing the writing of her daughter Ursula, whose fiction frequently examines cultural contact. Buzaljko's 1989 biography of Kroeber stated that her "great strength was as an interpreter of one culture to another", going on to say that through her writing she demonstrated the connections between the history of California's indigenous people and modern society.

== Selected works ==
- The Inland Whale. 1959. Indiana University Press, Bloomington.
- Ishi in Two Worlds: a biography of the last wild Indian in North America. 1961. Berkley Books.
- Ishi, Last of His Tribe. Illus. Ruth Robbins. 1964. Parnassus Press, Berkeley, California.
- Almost Ancestors: The First Californians. Kroeber and Robert F. Heizer. 1968. Sierra Club Books, San Francisco.
- Alfred Kroeber: A Personal Configuration. 1970. University of California Press, Berkeley.
- Drawn from Life: California Indians in Pen and Brush. Compiled by Kroeber, Robert F. Heizer and Albert B. Elsasser. 1976. Ballena Press, Socorro, New Mexico.
- Ishi, the Last Yahi: A Documentary History. Kroeber and Robert F. Heizer. 1979. University of California Press, Berkeley.
