= T. T. Waterman =

American anthropologist

Thomas Talbot Waterman (April 23, 1885 – January 6, 1936) was an American anthropologist who studied indigenous groups in North and Central America, particularly Northern California. He is best known for being one of the anthropologists who brought Ishi to the University of California's Museum of Anthropology(later the Phoebe A. Hearst Museum of Anthropology).

== Early life ==
Waterman was born in Hamilton, Missouri to John Hayes Waterman and Catherine Shields Church and raised in Fresno, California. Waterman was the tenth and last child born to his family. His father was a member of the Episcopalian clergy, and Waterman was expected to follow in his footsteps.

== Education ==
In May 1905, Waterman was awarded a State of California Scholarship to attend UC Berkeley. Waterman initially planned to study linguistics with a focus in Hebrew, hoping to become a clergyman as his father had. However, after enrolling in a phonetics class taught by Pliny Earle Goddard and assisting with fieldwork on Pacific Coast Athabaskan languages, Waterman developed a strong interest in anthropology. Waterman completed his bachelor's degree in 1907.

According to Susan Marie Wood, after graduating he secured a position at the University of California's Museum of Anthropology working for Alfred L. Kroeber on the strength of Goddard's recommendation. At that time, Waterman's only anthropological training was from the fieldwork he had assisted Goddard with.

Later, at Columbia University, Waterman completed a Ph.D. in anthropology. Kroeber advocated for Waterman's admission to the Anthropology PhD program at Columbia under Franz Boas. Waterman completed his PhD in 1913, afterwards returning to work at the University of California. He remained there in various curatorial and teaching roles until 1921.

== Career ==
Waterman wrote anthropological articles and books on a wide range of indigenous groups in North and Central America over the course of his career. According to longtime colleague and mentor Kroeber, Waterman also had an interest in racial classification.

=== Early career ===
Shortly after hiring Waterman in 1907, Kroeber began sending Waterman on field assignments to record indigenous Californian tribes. Between 1907 and 1909, the bulk of Waterman's fieldwork was to make recordings of Kumeyaay songs and ceremonies. During this period, Waterman made connections with California ethnographer Constance Goddard DuBois and field collector Edward H. Davis, who had existing relationships with the Kumeyaay. Waterman also acted as an intermediary between indigenous Californians and A.L. Kroeber in Kroeber's attempts to procure indigenous artifacts for the Museum of Anthropology.

=== Ishi ===
In 1910, Waterman was part of an expedition to the Oroville, California area to attempt contact with the Yahi, or if contact was not made then to find and collect indigenous artifacts, as well as take photographs of the area. Contact was not made on the expedition, but Waterman did find sites of recent habitation and took artifacts from those sites.

When Ishi came to Oroville and was arrested, Waterman traveled at Kroeber's request to meet him. Waterman and Ishi at first struggled to communicate, but eventually found they both knew the Yana word for wood. After Waterman made several visits to Ishi in jail, Kroeber and Waterman were able to secure his release. Waterman took Ishi to the University of California Museum of Anthropology, then in San Francisco.

According to Nancy Rockafellar's chronology of Ishi's final years, Waterman worked regularly with Ishi between their meeting in 1911 and Ishi's death in 1916. Waterman, along with Ishi, Kroeber, and Saxton Pope went on a mapping expedition in the area of Deer Creek, Tehama County in 1914. In the summer of 1915, Waterman and his wife Grace hosted Ishi at their home for several months. As Ishi's health continued to decline, Waterman corresponded frequently with Kroeber and other colleagues about Ishi's health and treatment.

When Ishi died in 1916, Waterman was in the Bay Area, but Kroeber was not. According to Rockafellar, Waterman was "presumably present" when Ishi was autopsied by Pope and Ishi's brain was taken from his body. Although Ishi was known to be "appalled" by the prospect of dissection, there is no record of Waterman objecting to the autopsy or the sending of Ishi's brain to Aleš Hrdlička at the Smithsonian.

=== Later career ===
After leaving the University of California in 1921, Waterman held a variety of jobs. First he worked as a field collector for the Heye Foundation until 1922. The collections he made for the Heye Foundation, which include artifacts, recordings, and photographs, are now held at the National Museum of the American Indian.

After this he held positions at the Bureau of American Ethnology and the Museo Nacional de Arqueología y Etnología. By 1927, he had moved on to a teaching position at Fresno State. The year following, he held a position at the University of Arizona. From 1929 until his death, he worked at the University of Hawai’i.

== Personal life ==
Waterman married Grace Godwin in 1910. Waterman had two children with Godwin: Helen Maria Waterman in 1913 and Thomas Talbot Waterman Jr. in 1916. Waterman's marriage to Godwin ended in divorce. In 1927, Waterman married Ruth Dulaney.

Waterman died on January 6, 1936, at the age of 50 in Honolulu, shortly after being appointed Territorial Archivist at the University of Hawai’i.

== Partial list of works ==
- Kroeber, Alfred Louis; Waterman, Thomas Talbot; Sapir, Edward; Sparkman, Philip Stedman (January–March 1908). "Notes on California folk-lore". Journal of American Folklore. 21 (80): 35–42. doi:10.2307/534527. hdl:2027/uc1.31822005860226. JSTOR 534527.
- The Yana Indians (1908)
- Religious Practices of the Diegueño Indians (1910)
- The phonetic elements of the Northern Paiute language (Berkeley: University Press, 1911)
- Waterman, Thomas Talbot (January 1915). "The Last Wild Tribe of California". Popular Science Monthly. Vol. 86. pp. 233–244.
- Waterman, Thomas Talbot (1917). "Ishi, The Last Yahi Indian". The Southern Workman. 46. Hampton, Virginia: Press of the Hampton Normal and Agricultural Institute: 528–537.
  - Ishi, the Last Yahi Indian public domain audiobook at LibriVox
  - Short Nonfiction Collection Vol. 026 public domain audiobook at LibriVox (2012).
- Yurok Geography (University of California Publications in American Archaeology and Ethnology; Berkeley, Calif.: University of California Press, 1920)
- Source book in anthropology, (1920, with A. L. Kroeber)
- Waterman, T.T., 1922. The Geographical Names Used by the Indians of the Pacific Coast. American Geographical Society 12(2):175–194
- Native Houses of Western North America
