= Hiram Good =

From left to right: Sandy Young, Jay Salisbury, Hi Good (Seated) and "Indian Ned" Oroville, 1870

Harmon Augustus Good (c. 1836 – May 4, 1870) led a life as an “Indian hunter.” His closest friends in California addressed him as Hiram or simply "Hi" Good. On May 4, 1870, at the age of 34 he was killed by members of Ishi’s Yahi band, who, especially would have had the motive. Good became a ruthless leader of volunteer vigilante parties, who battled the diverse mix of Native Americans in northern California during the Indian war years, 1857 to 1865. Many locals proclaimed him the “Boone of the Sierra.” According to Butte County historian George Mansfield, “Good, in particular, was held in the most bitter hatred among the Indians.” In 1923 fellow Indian hunter Sim Moak recalled that “at one time Good had forty scalps hanging in the poplar tree by his house” and described Good adorning the outseam of his pants with scalps: “you can imagine a great tall man with a string of scalps from his belt to his ankle."

== Early life ==
Good was born in 1836 in Pennsylvania, the second child and only son of four children born to Henry and Mary Good. In 1849, the Good family moved to Dayton, Ohio. Good’s first job at age 15 in the 1850 census was clerk for his father who was a hotel keeper. Sometime in 1854, when Good was 18 years old he left for California. He ended up homesteading in Lower Deer Creek (today’s Vina) in Tehama County, California. Good’s Proof of Claim was filed in the Marysville office on February 4, 1857.

== California Indian Wars ==
Indian problems escalated in 1857, threatening to usurp Good’s homesteading plans and chosen livelihood. By 1857, the first wave of Native American refugees who left the ailing reservations took sanctuary in the eastern foothill country of Tehama County. These Native Americans became known as the “Mill Creeks,” a locational name for the group whose hideaways were largely along the Mill Creek drainage. Presumably Good’s earliest encounter with Mill Creeks was recalled by Dan Delaney who wrote: “In 1857 there existed a band of savage Indians in the neighborhood of Good’s ranch in Tehama county, who were making frequent raids upon the section. Finding a number of them one day engaged in stealing his corn and having no weapons, he charged upon them with stones and put them to flight.” In the winter of 1857, Robert Anderson added that “because the Indian raids became numerous and caused much uneasiness among the settlers, he and Good led a party of fifteen men. And that “Good was elected Lieutenant”. By late August 1864, the California Genocide escalated as massacres took place in Shasta County, California, such that, “The whole number of surviving Yanas of pure and mixed blood was not far from fifty”.

At Butte Creek I left the Chico and Humboldt road and marched to Deer Creek Meadows, with the intention of procuring the services of Captain Hiram Good, who is well known here as one of the best Indian hunters in the country, and a man who knows the geography of the country in which the Deer Creek Indians range, and to take the old Lassen road down to the valley between Deer and Mill Creeks, for the purpose of finding the Deer Creek Indians, but when I arrived at the Deer Creek Meadows I found that Captain Good had left for the valley, and that the Lassen road was almost obliterated.
— The War of the Rebellion: Official Records of the Civil War, 1864

== Death ==
By 1865, Good retired from being a paid scalp hunter and began sheep ranching in Vina, California. Good “obtained” a 12-year old Indian boy known only as “Indian Ned” as a slave and sheep herder. On about March 15, 1870, Good, with three other men, ambushed a band of about fifteen Indians of the Kom’-bo (Yahi) tribe, who were gathering acorns along the Mill Creek drainage. When the band’s leader called the “Old Doctor,” tried to run to save himself, Good took aim with his Henry rifle and killed him. Three women were made captives. Good’s party returned with them to Good’s sheep camp where he ordered Indian Ned to guard them. Two weeks later the remaining members of the tribe came to Good’s cabin. They make a formality of surrendering their bows to the number of five, known as “the five bows incident.” Theodora Kroeber later wrote, “The presentation of the five bows was the climactic last act in Yahi history, determinative of the whole of its further course”. After the bows are presented the Yahi are told that Good is away in Tehama. Soon his ranch hands give the Indians the notion that they are to be hanged so they flee and are never seen again. The three captive women are handed over to a white man named Carter, living about a mile from Deer Creek.

After the Yahi learned that their family members were sold off they sought revenge on Good, eventually persuading his slave Indian Ned to kill Good. On May 4, 1870, Ned shot and killed Hi Good in an area of Tehama county known as Ned’s Draw. The obituary read that he was “pierced with twelve bullets and his head smashed with rocks”. Ned later admitted to killing Good, and was subsequently killed by Good's friend and partner, Sandy Young.

== In popular culture ==
- Pioneer author Halbert Sauber's Adventures of a Tenderfoot dedicates a chapter to a fictional account of meeting Hiram Good.

== See also ==
- Ishi, last known member of the Yahi people of the Yana people of the Native Americans in the United States
