= The Last of His Tribe =

- Genre: Drama; Romance
- Written by: Stephen Harrigan
- Directed by: Harry Hook
- Starring: Jon Voight; Graham Greene
- Music by: John E. Keane
- Country of origin: United States
- Original language: English

Production
- Producers: John Levoff; Robert Lovenheim
- Production locations: Modesto, California; San Francisco; Bellingham, Washington; Oakland, California; Red Hills Ranch, Sonora, California; Sacramento, California
- Cinematography: Martin Fuhrer
- Editor: Bill Yahraus
- Running time: 91 minutes
- Production companies: HBO Pictures; River City Productions

Original release
- Network: HBO
- Release: March 28, 1992

The Last of His Tribe is a 1992 American made-for-television drama film based on the book Ishi in Two Worlds by Theodora Kroeber which relates the experiences of her husband Alfred L. Kroeber who made friends with Ishi, thought to be the last of his people, the Yahi tribe. Jon Voight stars as Kroeber and Graham Greene as Ishi. Harry Hook directed the film.

== Plot ==
The movie is based on the real experiences of a Native American, Ishi, as he tries to adjust to a 20th-century society that is foreign to him.

== Cast ==
- Jon Voight as Professor Alfred Kroeber
- Graham Greene as Ishi
- David Ogden Stiers as Saxton Pope
- Jack Blessing as Tom Waterman
- Anne Archer as Henriette Kroeber
- Daniel Benzali as Mr. Whitney

== Production ==
The railroad scenes were filmed on the Sierra Railroad in Tuolumne County, California.

== Reception ==
For his performance, Jon Voight was nominated for the 1992 Golden Globe Award for Best Actor – Miniseries or Television Film.

== See also ==
- Ishi: The Last of His Tribe
