= Vina, California =

Vina
- census-designated place
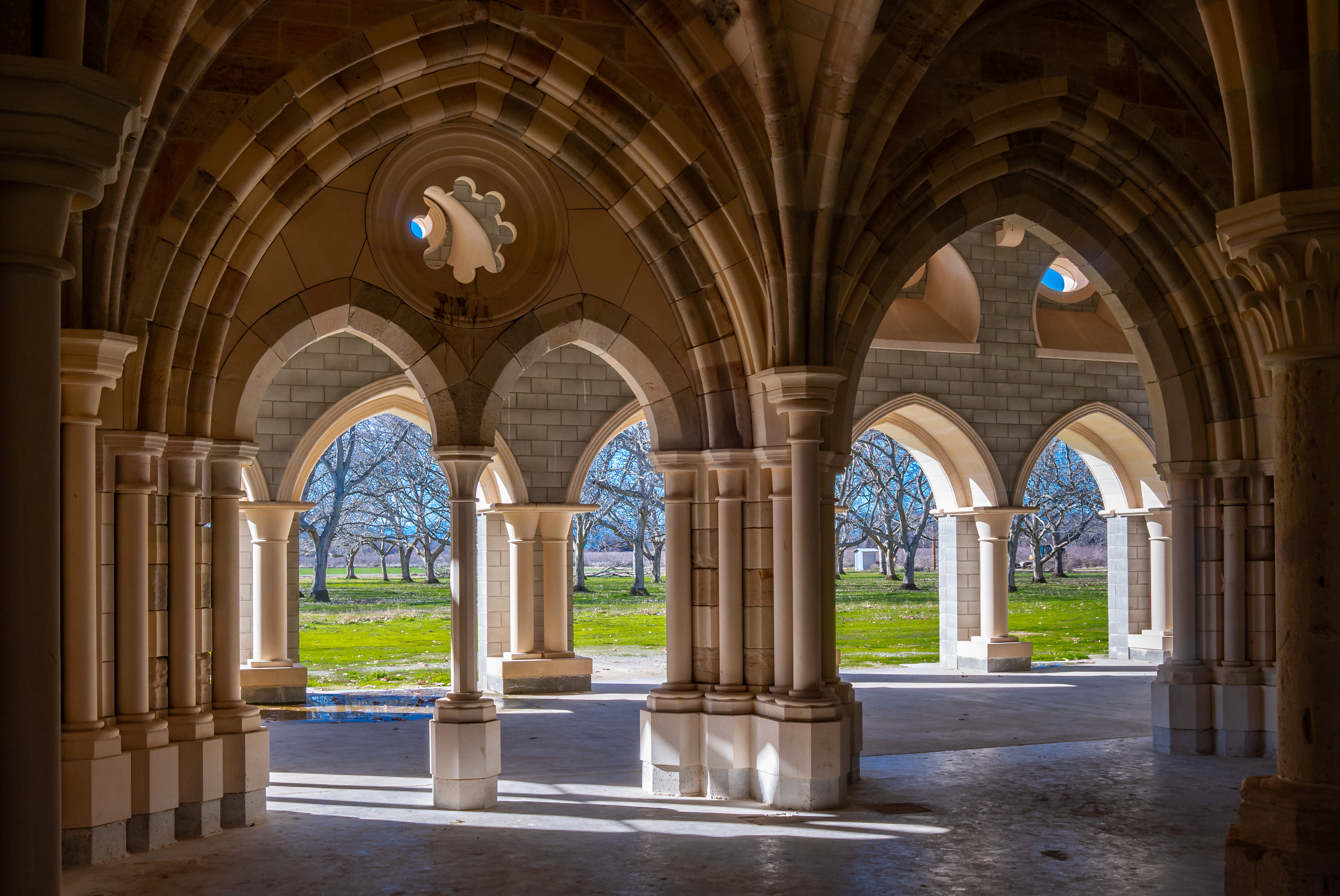
- Abbey of New Clairvaux

- Position in California.
- Coordinates: 39°56′01″N 122°03′09″W
- Country: United States
- State: California
- County: Tehama

Area
  - Total: 1.352 sq mi (3.501 km^{2})
  - Land: 1.352 sq mi (3.501 km^{2})
  - Water: 0 sq mi (0 km^{2}) 0%
- Elevation: 210 ft (64 m)

Population (2020)
  - Total: 198
  - Density: 146/sq mi (56.6/km^{2})
- Time zone: UTC-8 (Pacific (PST))
  - Summer (DST): UTC-7 (PDT)
- ZIP Code: 96092
- Area code: 530
- GNIS feature ID: 2628796

Vina (Spanish: Viña, meaning "Vine") is a census-designated place (CDP) in Tehama County, California, United States. Vina sits at an elevation of 210 feet (64 m). The 2020 United States census reported Vina's population was 198.

Vina is the location of the Roman Catholic Trappist Abbey of New Clairvaux.

== History ==
Hiram Good, "Indian hunter", homesteaded in Lower Deer Creek, later Vina, filing Proof of Claim in the Marysville office on February 4, 1857.

Lower Deer Creek became Vina in the 1860s when a winery was founded. It derives its name from the Spanish-language word meaning "vineyard". A post office has been in operation at Vina since 1871.

Beginning in 1881, railroad industrialist and former governor Leland Stanford bought land in and around Vina, which he developed into a huge ranch of 55,000 acres (22,000 hectares). It included what was at the time the largest vineyard in the world — 4,000 acres (1,600 hectares) growing 3 million vines. The ranch also grew fruit, vegetables, and grain, along with hundreds of horses, cattle, and hogs. His wines were not successful, and he turned to producing medicinal brandy instead. The village grew with the ranch; at its height Vina had a population of 1,300 and boasted two hotels and five saloons. After Stanford's death his widow Jane Stanford tried to maintain the ranch, keeping it until 1898 or later.

On July 1, 1955, a property known as the Flynn Ranch was sold to Gethsemani Abbey and became the site of the Vina Monastery. In 1959 it became the Abbey of New Clairvaux.

== Geography ==
According to the United States Census Bureau, the CDP covers an area of 1.4 square miles (3.5 km^{2}), all land.

== Demographics ==
Historical population
Census	Pop.	Note	%±
2010	237		—
2020	198		−16.5%
U.S. Decennial Census; 1860–1870 1880-1890; 1900 1910 1920; 1930 1940 1950; 1960 1970 1980; 1990 2000 2010

Vina first appeared as a census designated place in the 2010 U.S. census.

The 2020 United States census reported that Vina had a population of 198. The population density was 146.4 inhabitants per square mile (56.5/km^{2}). The racial makeup of Vina was 124 (62.6%) White, 0 (0.0%) African American, 4 (2.0%) Native American, 2 (1.0%) Asian, 0 (0.0%) Pacific Islander, 27 (13.6%) from other races, and 41 (20.7%) from two or more races. Hispanic or Latino of any race were 68 persons (34.3%).

The census reported that 91.4% of the population lived in households, 8.6% lived in non-institutionalized group quarters, and no one was institutionalized.

There were 69 households, out of which 20 (29.0%) had children under the age of 18 living in them, 27 (39.1%) were married-couple households, 6 (8.7%) were cohabiting couple households, 17 (24.6%) had a female householder with no partner present, and 19 (27.5%) had a male householder with no partner present. 16 households (23.2%) were one person, and 11 (15.9%) were one person aged 65 or older. The average household size was 2.62. There were 52 families (75.4% of all households).

The age distribution was 32 people (16.2%) under the age of 18, 14 people (7.1%) aged 18 to 24, 40 people (20.2%) aged 25 to 44, 55 people (27.8%) aged 45 to 64, and 57 people (28.8%) who were 65 years of age or older. The median age was 51.0 years. There were 110 males and 88 females.

There were 69 housing units at an average density of 51.0 units per square mile (19.7 units/km^{2}), which were all occupied, 46 (66.7%) by homeowners, and 23 (33.3%) by renters.

== See also ==
- Ishi, last known member of the Yahi people of the Yana people of the Native Americans in the United States
