= The Inland Whale =

1959 book by Theodora Kroeber

- Author: Theodora Kroeber
- Publisher: Indiana University Press
- Publication date: 1959

The Inland Whale is a 1959 book by Theodora Kroeber. It is a retelling of nine pieces of Indigenous American folklore, along with authorial commentary. Kroeber's prose received praise, though a reviewer noted that she had taken some liberties with the narratives. The book was described as a work of comparative literature, that sought to demonstrate the literary merit of indigenous oral traditions.

== Contents ==
The Inland Whale contains nine pieces of Indigenous American folklore, and a large section of commentary from the author. Sources for the stories include two unpublished legends from the Yurok and Karok peoples narrated to Theodora Kroeber and her husband Alfred, as well as material in existing collections from the Wintu, Yana, Maidu, Yokuts, and Mohave indigenous groups. The pieces share a common theme of heroines. One is a poem, and another an excerpt from a longer epic work. The pieces are loosely translated by Kroeber, who also edited them to make them accessible to Westerners with no knowledge of ethnology. Kroeber occasionally merged versions of the stories from different groups. The commentary section contains references to the original publication of all the pieces. It also covers the history and distribution of each piece. The book's introduction is by anthropologist Oliver La Farge.

== Reception ==
Scholar David French, reviewing the book for The Journal of American Folklore, compared it favorably to other retellings of Indigenous American stories, and wrote that it was useful for both scholars and laypeople. According to French, the stories had been edited in a "conscientious and responsible" manner, and the book "demonstrated that a patronizing approach to Indian oral literature is unnecessary". He added that for the general reader the stories were "absorbing", and could "[evoke] pleasure, tenderness, even horror". Butler Waugh, writing in Midwest Folklore, similarly said that despite being written for a popular audience, the book was an "excellent one for folklorists", and added that Kroeber's notes made it "worth its price and more". Scholar Walter Goldschmidt wrote in the American Anthropologist that Kroeber had "built much better than she realizes", and praised her "sensitive, almost lyrical" prose. However, Goldschmidt said that the stories had "too much of herself", and that Kroeber had possibly taken too many liberties with the original narratives. Folklorist James Tidwell criticized Kroeber's modification of the narrative style in the story "Dance Mad", but otherwise called the book "excellent".

== Analysis ==
The Inland Whale is described as a work of comparative literature. Goldschmidt writes that Kroeber's work is in a long tradition of retellings of folk narratives, such as those by Hans Christian Andersen, the Brothers Grimm, and Joel Chandler Harris, which Kroeber extends by examining an oral tradition. French notes that Indigenous American stories were frequently neglected by scholars, as they were transmitted orally; Kroeber sought in her book to demonstrate their merit as literature. Kroeber examines the "literary implications" of the stories in her commentary at the end of the book. The stories resemble distinct forms of written literature: Waugh therefore argues that the stories demonstrated "genre variations" in oral traditions. Charles S. Bryant, reviewing a 1965 reprint, commented that the book's greatest value may lie in communicating the value of oral traditions to a lay audience. Scholar Donald C. Cutter wrote that the book showcased the wide cultural variation within the Californian indigenous people, and therein had a valuable lesson for historians who saw them as a monolithic people.
