= Ishi: The Last of His Tribe =

- Directed by: Robert Ellis Miller
- Written by: Theodora Kroeber (book); Christopher Trumbo (screenplay); Dalton Trumbo (screenplay)
- Produced by: Edward Lewis (executive p.); Mildred Lewis (executive p.); Vicki Niemi; James F. Sommers
- Starring: Eloy Casados
- Distributed by: NBC
- Release date: 1978
- Country: United States
- Language: English

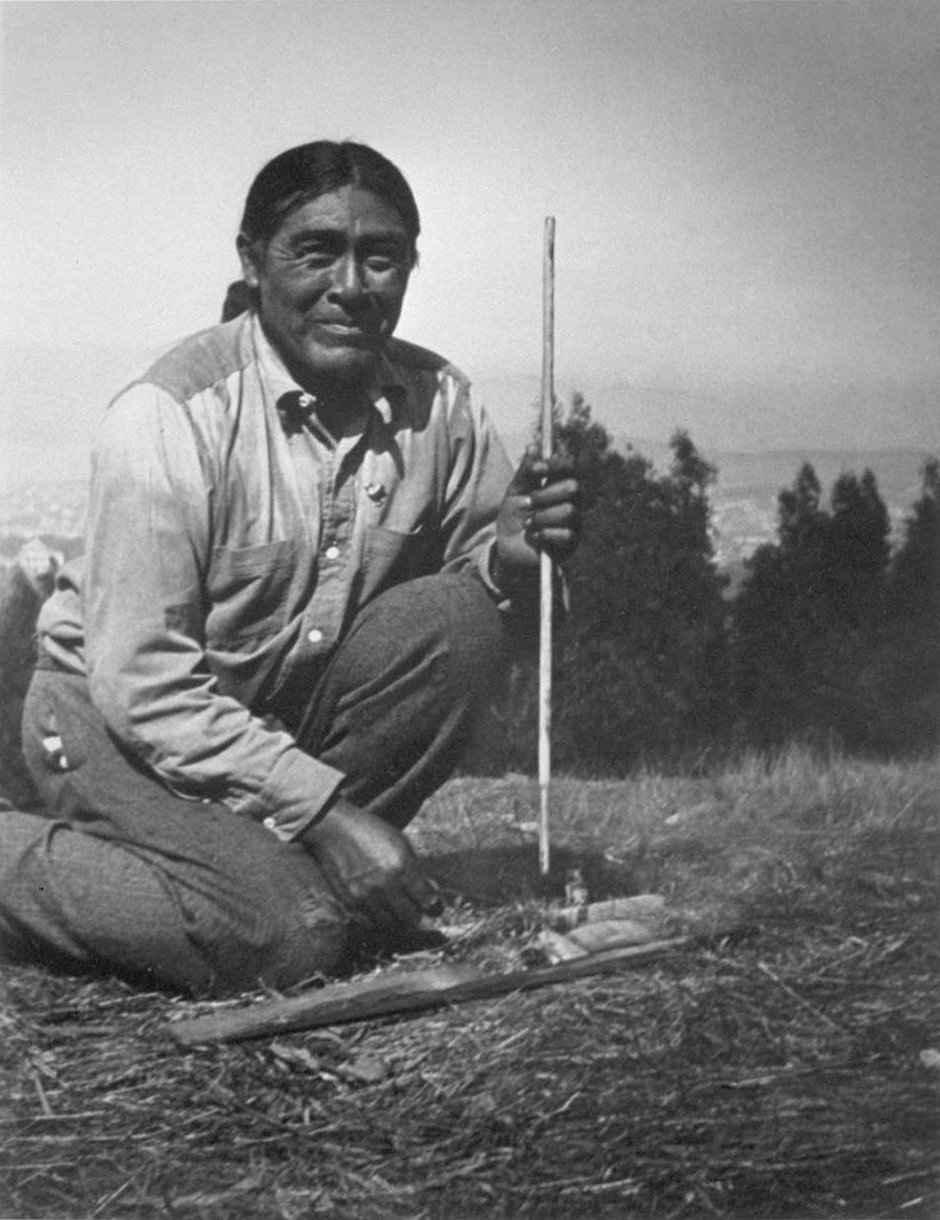
Ishi in 1914

Ishi: The Last of His Tribe (1978) is a made-for-television biopic based on the book Ishi in Two Worlds by Theodora Kroeber. The book relates the experiences of her husband Alfred L. Kroeber, who made friends with Ishi, thought to be the last of his people, the Yahi tribe.

The telecast aired first on NBC on December 20, 1978.

The film was written by Christopher Trumbo and his father, Dalton Trumbo, and directed by Robert Ellis Miller.

Eloy Casados played the title role.

== Cast ==
- Dennis Weaver as Prof. Benjamin Fuller
- Eloy Casados as Ishi (man)
- Joseph Runningfox as Ishi (teenager)
- Michael Medina as Ishi (boy)
- Devon Ericson as Lushi (teenager)
- Patricia Ganera as Lushi (girl)
- Gregory Cruz as Timawi (teenager)
- Eddie Marquez as Timawi (boy)
- Joaquín Martínez as Grandfather
- Geno Silva as Elder Uncle
- Lois Red Elk as Grandmother
- Arliene Nofchissey Williams as Mother
- Dennis Dimster as Tad Fuller
- Wayne Heffley as Sheriff Lockhart
- Peter Brandon as Dr. Robbins
- Missy Gold as Little Girl
- Jay W. MacIntosh as Music Hall Singer
- Ernest D. Paul as Barton
