= Redding Rancheria =

Tribal reservation in California, US

Coordinates: 40°30′24″N 122°23′01″W

Location of Redding Rancheria

The Redding Rancheria is a federally recognized tribe with a reservation in Shasta County, Northern California. The 31-acre site (13 ha) of the Redding Rancheria was purchased in 1922 by the Bureau of Indian Affairs in order to provide Indigenous peoples with a place to camp and live. They had been made landless by European-American settlers in the area. Three groups of Native Americans in the area organized as a tribe and were recognized in 1979.

== Description ==
The Redding Rancheria consists of Wintu, Achomawi (Pit River), and Yana Indians. It is located in the northern Sacramento Valley, near Redding.

== Government ==
The Redding Rancheria has a constitution, adopted in 1989, signed by Bob Foreman the First tribal chairman. It is governed by seven Councilors and three Alternate Councilors, elected by the membership. The 2025 tribal administration is as follows.

- Tribal Chairman – Jack Potter, Jr.
- Vice Chairman – Nicole Wilkes
- Secretary – Patty Spaulding
- Treasurer – Miranda Edwards Favorite
- Council Member – Tony Hayward, Sr.
- Council Member – Leon Benner
- Council Member – Don Benner
- 1st Alternate – Jason Hayward, Jr.
- 2nd Alternate – Jason Hart
- 3rd Alternate – Trish Baker

== Economic development ==
The Redding Rancheria established the Win-River Resort & Casino along California State Route 273, near Interstate 5 between Redding and Anderson. It has produced significant revenue for the tribe, enabling capital payments to each member.

== Education ==
The ranchería is served by the Cascade Union Elementary School District and Anderson Union High School District.

== See also ==
- Indigenous peoples of California
- Pit River tribes
