= Eloy Casados =

American actor (1949–2016)

- Born: Eloy Phil Casados; September 28, 1949; Long Beach, California
- Died: April 19, 2016 (aged 66); Pasadena, California, United States
- Occupation: Actor
- Years active: 1970–2016

Eloy Phil Casados (September 28, 1949 - April 19, 2016) was an American film, television and voice actor. He appeared in more than 20 films and 30 television series.

He was best known for playing Ishi in the 1978 NBC television movie Ishi: The Last of His Tribe and as Sheriff Sam Coyote in the CBS action television series Walker, Texas Ranger.

== Filmography ==
=== Film ===
Year	Title	Character	Notes
1970	Pieces of Dreams	Charlie	Credited as Phil Casados
1973	Mustang		Credited as Phil Casados
1979	Walk Proud	Hugo	Credited as Eloy Phil Casados
1983	Sacred Ground	Prairie Fox	
1983	Under Fire	Pedro	
1984	Cloak & Dagger	Alvarez	
1986	Down and Out in Beverly Hills	Tom "Tom-Tom"	
1986	The Best of Times	Carlos	
1986	Hollywood Vice Squad	Carlos	
1987	Born in East L.A.	Thug #1	
1989	Blaze	Antoine	
1991	A Climate for Killing	Ruiz Sanchez	
1991	Harley Davidson and the Marlboro Man	Jose	
1991	The Linguini Incident	Tony	
1992	White Men Can't Jump	Tony Stucci	
1993	Skeeter	Hank Tucker	
1994	Cobb	Louis Prima	
1995	The Nature of the Beast	Sheriff #1	
1999	Play It to the Bone	Vince's Trainer	
2001	Girl's Best Friend	Antonio	
2002	Dark Blue	SWAT Commander Rico	
2003	Hollywood Homicide	Detective Eddie Cruz	
2007	D-War	Homeless Man	
2008	Frost/Nixon	Manolo Sanchez	
2011	Bridesmaids	Churra Chi Waiter	
2014	50 to 1	Charlie Figueroa	
2015	McFarland, USA	Dale Padilla	
2018	Primal Rage	Sheriff	Posthumous

=== Television ===
Year	Title	Character	Notes
1976	The Blue Knight	Spanish Officer	Episode: "The Rose and the Gun"
1976	Family	Rudy Cortés	Episode: "Jury Duty"
1977	Panic in Echo Park		TV movie
1977	Young Dan'l Boone	Tsiskwa	Lead role
1976–1978	Police Story	Various	Two episodes
1978	Ishi: The Last of His Tribe	Ishi	TV movie
1978	The Next Step Beyond	Mendoza	Episode: "Portrait of the Mind"
1979	The Incredible Hulk	Frank	Episode: "Kindred Spirits"
1980	Amber Waves	Dwight Phillips	TV movie
1981	Freedom	Ron	TV movie
1982	The Legend of Walks Far Woman		TV movie
1986	Knight Rider	Raoul	Episode: "Knight Flight to Freedom"
1985–1986	Hill Street Blues	Various	Two episodes
1987	The Alamo: Thirteen Days to Glory	Gregorio	TV movie
1987	Houston Knights		Episode: Mirrors
1987	Hunter	Mexican Police Captain	Episode: "Hot Pursuit: Part 2"
1988	To Heal a Nation		TV movie
1988	Steal the Sky	Ground Crewman	TV movie
1989	Prime Target	Thin Man	TV movie
1990	Equal Justice	Jury Foreman	Episode: "The Art of the Possible"
1990	Bar Girls	Ortega	TV movie
1990	The Great Los Angeles Earthquake	Ektor	TV movie
1991	Adam-12	Mr. Madrid	Episode: "Panic in Alverez Park"
1991	Northern Exposure	Smith	Episode: "The Big Kiss"
1992	Trial: The Price of Passion		TV movie
1992	Human Target		Episode: "Pilot"
1993	Bloodlines: Murder in the Family	Dominguez	TV movie
1995	Hudson Street	Joe Valentine	Episode: "Guess Who's Coming to Dinner?"
1996	Murphy Brown	Manager	Episode: "If You're Going to Talk the Talk"
1996	Grand Avenue	Albert	TV movie
1997	Nash Bridges	Maximo Ortiz	Episode: "Inside Out"
1997	Murder Live!	Tony Grenaldi	TV movie
1997	Nothing Sacred	Clement	Episode: "Spirit and Substance"
1996–1998	Walker, Texas Ranger	Sheriff Sam Coyote	Four episodes
1997–1999	King of the Hill	Enrique	Four episodes
2001	18 Wheels of Justice		Episode: "Old Wives' Tale"
2001	NYPD Blue	Diego	Episode: "In-Laws, Outlaws"
2001	Epoch	Mexican Doctor	TV movie
2007	George Lopez	Dr. Anthony Tovar	Episode: "George's Bogey-ous Relationship with Vic Is Putt to the Test"
2007	CSI: Crime Scene Investigation	Sheriff Joe Vasquez	Episode: "Leapin' Lizards"
2009	Southland	Mr. Moretta	Episode: "Sally in the Alley"
2009	Ruby & The Rockits	Chief Dan Littlefeather	Two episodes
2011	The Young and the Restless	Bob	Episode #9665
2011	Up All Night	Pete	Episode: "New Car"
2011	Pretend Time	Man	Episode: "Baby Not from Booty"
2013	Rizzoli & Isles	Factory Manager	Episode: "But I Am a Good Girl"
2013	Longmire	Mancell Lone Elk	Episode: "Red Tuscan"
2014	Shameless	Roger Runningtree	Three episodes
2014	Castle	Yavapai Elder	Episode: "Once Upon a Time in the West"

=== Video games ===
Year	Title	Character
2000	Code Blue	John Jackson
