= Saxton Pope =

American hunter and physician

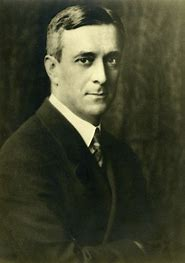
Dr. Saxton Pope

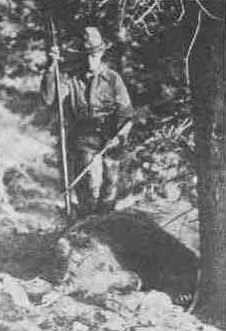
Picture of Pope taken while grizzly hunting at Yellowstone

Saxton Temple Pope (September 4, 1875 – August 8, 1926) was an American doctor, teacher, author and outdoorsman. He is most famous as the father of modern bow hunting, and for his close relationship with Ishi, the last member of the Yahi tribe and the last known American Indian to be raised largely isolated from Western culture.

== Early life ==
Born in Fort Stockton, Texas as the son of an army surgeon, Pope grew up in military camps and frontier towns, where he learned outdoor skills and became an athlete. This is where he first learned archery, as well as horsemanship, riflery, knifemaking, and other skills. He built and attempted to fly a glider.

He later went to medical school at the University of California, Berkeley graduating in 1899. He set up a practice in Watsonville, California near San Francisco, married Emma Wightman, a medical school classmate, and had four children. In 1912, he became a surgical instructor at the medical school.

== Relationship with Ishi ==
The medical school where Pope taught was located near the museum where Ishi worked as a janitor, having been brought there for study by Professor T. T. Waterman of the University of California Department of Anthropology. Because Ishi had grown up in the isolated Yahi tribe, he had little immunity to diseases, and Pope met Ishi during his stays at the University hospital. Pope learned some of the Yahi language, and spent much time with Ishi, learning of his life and listening to the Yahi tribal folklore. Ishi taught Pope how to make bows and arrows as the Yahi did, and how to hunt with them. Pope and Ishi remained close until Ishi's death from tuberculosis in 1916. In spite of this close relationship and against Ishi's frequently stated wishes, Pope insisted that Ishi be autopsied after death and his brain removed.

== Later life ==
Pope became an avid bowhunter during his time with Ishi, and he continued that after Ishi's death. In 1920, with special permission, Pope and a companion, Arthur Young, went hunting grizzly bears in Yellowstone National Park with hand made bows and steel tipped arrows, taking several. The stuffed and mounted bears are on display at the California Academy of Sciences. Pope later wrote a book, Hunting with the Bow and Arrow, which remains in print. He continued bowhunting until his death in 1926 from pneumonia.

== In fiction ==
Pope was portrayed by David Ogden Stiers in the biographical film The Last of His Tribe (1992).
