= Cascade Union Elementary School District =

School district in California, United States

Location
- 1645 West Mill St. Anderson, California 96007 United States

Other information
- Website: www.cuesd.com

Cascade Union Elementary School District is a public school district based in Shasta County, California, United States.

== Schools ==
=== Middle School ===
- Anderson Middle School

=== Elementary ===
- Anderson Heights Elementary School
- Meadow Lane Elementary School

=== K-8 ===
- North State Aspire Academy
