= Ishi =

Last member of Yahi People

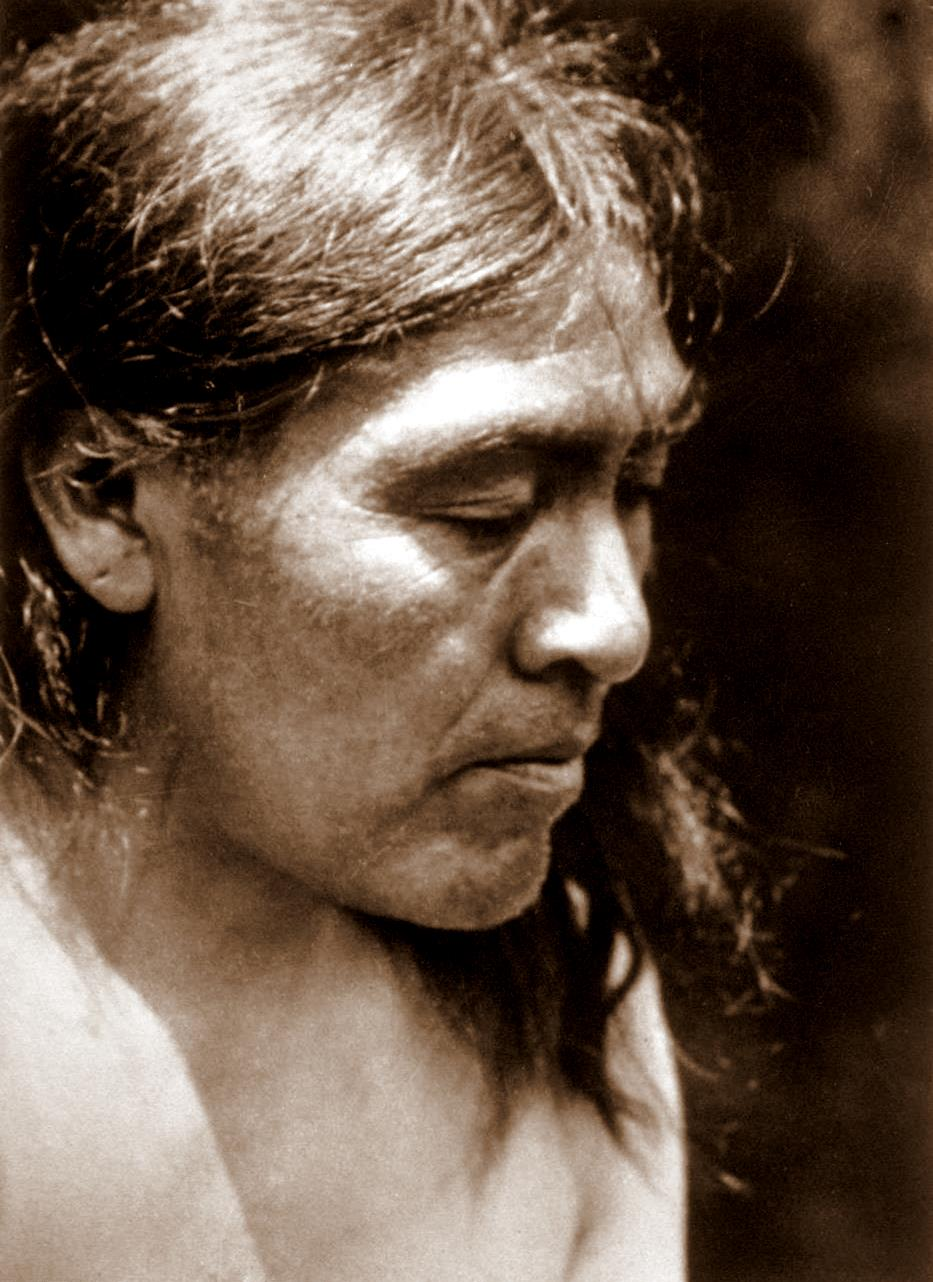
- Born: c. 1861; Northern California Sierra Foothills, U.S.
- Died: March 25, 1916 (age 54–55); University of California, San Francisco, U.S.
- Known for: last of the Yahi people, "last wild Indian"

Ishi (c. 1861 – March 25, 1916) was the last known member of the Native American Yahi people from the present-day state of California in the United States. The rest of the Yahi (as well as many members of their parent tribe, the Yana) were killed in the California genocide in the 19th century. Widely described as the "last wild Indian" in the United States, Ishi lived most of his life isolated from modern North American culture, and was the last known Native manufacturer of stone arrowheads. In 1911, aged 50, he emerged at a barn and corral, 2 mi (3.2 km) from downtown Oroville, California.

Ishi, which means "man" in the Yana language, is an adopted name. The anthropologist Alfred Kroeber gave him this name because in the Yahi culture, tradition demanded that he not speak his own name until formally introduced by another Yahi. When asked his name, he said: "I have none, because there were no people to name me", meaning that there was no other Yahi to speak his name on his behalf.

Anthropologists at the University of California, Berkeley, took Ishi in, studied him, and hired him as a janitor. He lived most of his remaining five years in a university building in San Francisco. His life was depicted and discussed in multiple films and books, notably the biographical account Ishi in Two Worlds published by Theodora Kroeber in 1961.

== Biography ==
=== Early life ===
Ishi was likely born in the year 1861 within the heart of Yahi and Yana territory. At the time of Ishi's birth, the Yana were based in the Sierra Nevada Mountains area between the Pit and Feather Rivers, with the Yahi subgroup living in the southern portion. Written accounts from the 19th century suggest that the Yahi were hunter-gatherers who lived in small egalitarian bands without centralized political authority, chose to seclude themselves even from neighboring peoples, and fiercely defended their territory of mountain canyons. Like many indigenous tribes in California, the Yana and especially the Yahi suffered heavy population losses when European settlers entered their territory during the California Gold Rush of 1848–55; prior to this the Yahi probably numbered several hundred, while the total Yana in the larger region numbered around 3,000.

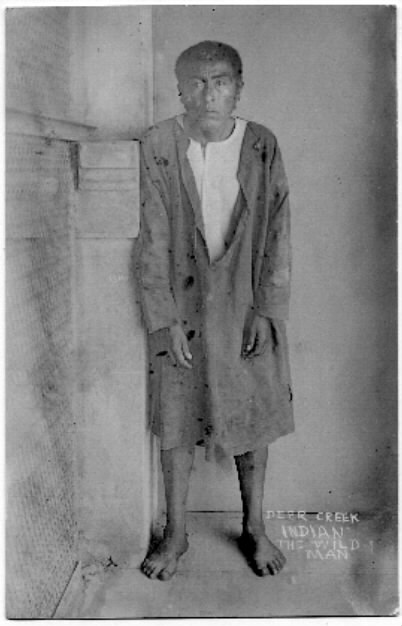
Ishi, August 29, 1911: Deer Creek Indian The Wild Man

In 1865, the Yahi were attacked in the Three Knolls Massacre, in which 40 of them were killed. Although 33 Yahi survived to escape, cattlemen killed about half of the survivors. The last survivors, including Ishi and his family, went into hiding for the next 44 years. Their tribe was popularly believed to be exterminated.

The gold rush brought tens of thousands of miners and settlers to northern California, putting pressure on native peoples. Gold mining poisoned water supplies and killed fish; deer became scarcer. The settlers brought new infectious diseases such as smallpox and measles. The northern Yana group was wiped out while the central and southern groups (who later became part of Redding Rancheria) and Yahi suffered drastic losses. Searching for food, they came into conflict with settlers, who set bounties of 50 cents per scalp and 5 dollars per head on the natives. In 1865, settlers attacked a group of Yahi while they were asleep.

Richard Burrill wrote, in Ishi Rediscovered:

In 1865, near the Yahi's special place, Black Rock, the waters of Mill Creek turned red at the Three Knolls Massacre. "Sixteen" or "seventeen" Indian fighters killed about forty Yahi, as part of a retaliatory attack for two white women and a man killed at the Workman's household on Lower Concow Creek near Oroville. Eleven of the Indian fighters that day were Robert A. Anderson, Harmon (Hi) Good, Sim Moak, Hardy Thomasson, Jack Houser, Henry Curtis, his brother Frank Curtis, as well as Tom Gore, Bill Matthews, and William Merithew. W. J. Seagraves visited the site, too, but some time after the battle had been fought.

Robert Anderson wrote, "Into the stream they leaped, but few got out alive. Instead many dead bodies floated down the rapid current." One captive Indian woman named Mariah from Big Meadows (Lake Almanor today), was one of those who did escape. The Three Knolls massacre is also described in Theodora Kroeber's Ishi in Two Worlds.

Since then more has been learned. It is estimated that with this massacre, Ishi's entire cultural group, the Yana/Yahi, may have been reduced to about sixty individuals. From 1859 to 1911, Ishi's remote band became more and more infiltrated by non-Yahi Indian representatives, such as Wintun, Nomlaki, and Pit River individuals.

In 1879, the federal government started Indian boarding schools in California. Some men from the reservations became renegades in the hills. Volunteers among the settlers and military troops carried out additional campaigns against the northern California Indian tribes during that period.

In 1908, a group of surveyors came across the camp inhabited by two men, a middle-aged woman, and an elderly woman. These were Ishi, his uncle, his mother, and a woman who was either a relative or wife of Ishi's. The former three fled while the elderly woman tried to hide herself, as she was disabled and unable to flee. The surveyors ransacked the camp, taking fur capes, arrows, bows, and nets. When Ishi appeared near Oroville three years later, he was alone and communicated through mime that his three companions had all died, his uncle and mother by drowning.

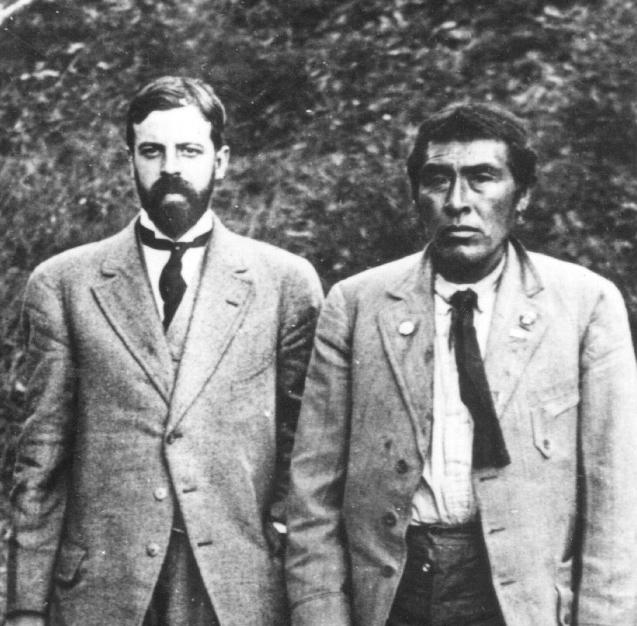
A. L. Kroeber, Ishi (Cropped from: Sam Batwi, Alfred L. Kroeber, and Ishi, at Parnassus Heights in 1911)

=== Arrival into European American society ===
After the 1908 encounter, Ishi spent three more years in the wilderness. It is unknown exactly when the rest of his family died. Starving and alone, Ishi, at around the age of 50, emerged on August 28, 1911, at a slaughterhouse near Oroville after forest fires in the area. The sheriff had Ishi handcuffed; he smiled and complied.

The "wild man" caught the imagination and attention of thousands of onlookers and curiosity seekers. University of California, Berkeley anthropology professors read about him and "brought him" to the Affiliated Colleges Museum (1903–1931), in an old law school building on the University of California's Affiliated Colleges campus on Parnassus Heights, San Francisco. Studied by the university, Ishi also worked as a janitor and lived at the museum the remaining five years of his life.

In October 1911, Ishi, Sam Batwi, T. T. Waterman, and A. L. Kroeber, went to the Orpheum Opera House in San Francisco to see Lily Lena (Alice Mary Ann Mathilda Archer, born 1877), the "London Songbird," known for "kaleidoscopic" costume changes. Lena gave Ishi a piece of gum as a token.

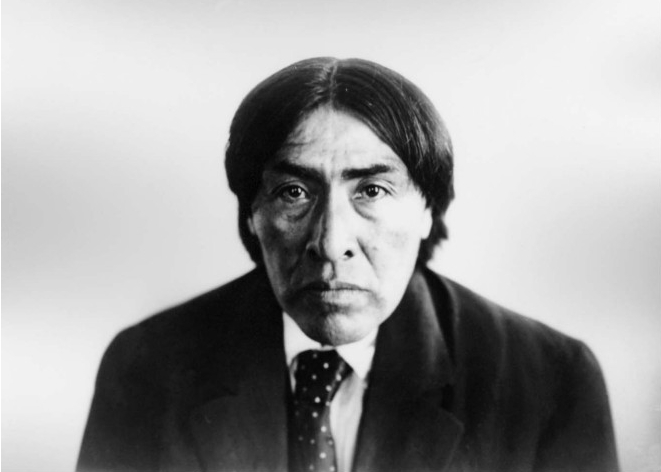
Ishi, 1912

On May 13, 1914, Ishi, Thomas Talbot Waterman, Alfred L. Kroeber, Saxton Pope, and Saxton Pope Jr. (11 years old), took Southern Pacific's Cascade Limited overnight train, from the Oakland Mole and Pier to Vina, California, on a trek in the homelands of the Deer Creek area of Tehama County, researching and mapping for the University of California, fleeing on May 30, 1914, during the Lassen Peak volcano eruption.

Waterman and Kroeber, director of the museum, studied Ishi closely and interviewed him at length in an effort to reconstruct Yahi culture. He described family units, naming patterns, and the ceremonies he knew. Much tradition had already been lost when he was growing up, as there were few older survivors in his group. He identified material items and showed the techniques by which they were made.

In February 1915, during the Panama–Pacific International Exposition, Ishi was filmed in the Sutro Forest with the actress Grace Darling for Hearst-Selig News Pictorial, No. 30.

Yahi song performed by Ishi, 1911-1912

In June 1915, for three months, Ishi lived in Berkeley with Waterman and his family.

In the summer of 1915, Ishi was interviewed on his native Yana language, which was recorded on wax cylinders and studied by the linguist Edward Sapir, who had previously done work on the northern dialects.

=== Death ===
Lacking acquired immunity to common diseases, Ishi was often ill. He was treated by Pope, a professor of medicine at UCSF. Pope became a close friend of Ishi, and learned from him how to make bows and arrows in the Yahi way. He and Ishi often hunted together. Ishi died of tuberculosis on March 25, 1916. It is said that his last words were, "You stay. I go." Kroeber, who was in New York at the time of Ishi's death, tried to prevent an autopsy on his body, sending letters and telegrams strongly stating his objections. He believed Yahi tradition called for the body to remain intact. But Pope performed the autopsy, per hospital protocol.

Ishi's brain was preserved and his body cremated, in the mistaken belief that cremation was the traditional Yahi practice. His friends placed several items with his remains before cremation: "one of his bows, five arrows, a basket of acorn meal, a boxfull of shell bead money, a purse full of tobacco, three rings, and some obsidian flakes." Ishi's remains, in a deerskin-wrapped Pueblo Indian pottery jar, were interred at Mount Olivet Cemetery in Colma, California, near San Francisco. Kroeber sent Ishi's preserved brain to the Smithsonian Institution in 1917. It was held there until August 10, 2000, when the Smithsonian repatriated it to the descendants of the Redding Rancheria and Pit River tribes. This was in accordance with the National Museum of the American Indian Act of 1989 (NMAI). According to Robert Fri, director of the National Museum of Natural History, "Contrary to commonly-held belief, Ishi was not the last of his kind. In carrying out the repatriation process, we learned that as a Yahi–Yana Indian his closest living descendants are the Yana people of northern California." His remains were also returned from Colma, and the tribal members intended to bury them in a secret place.

== Archery ==
Ishi used thumb draw and release with his short bows.

== Possible multi-ethnicity ==
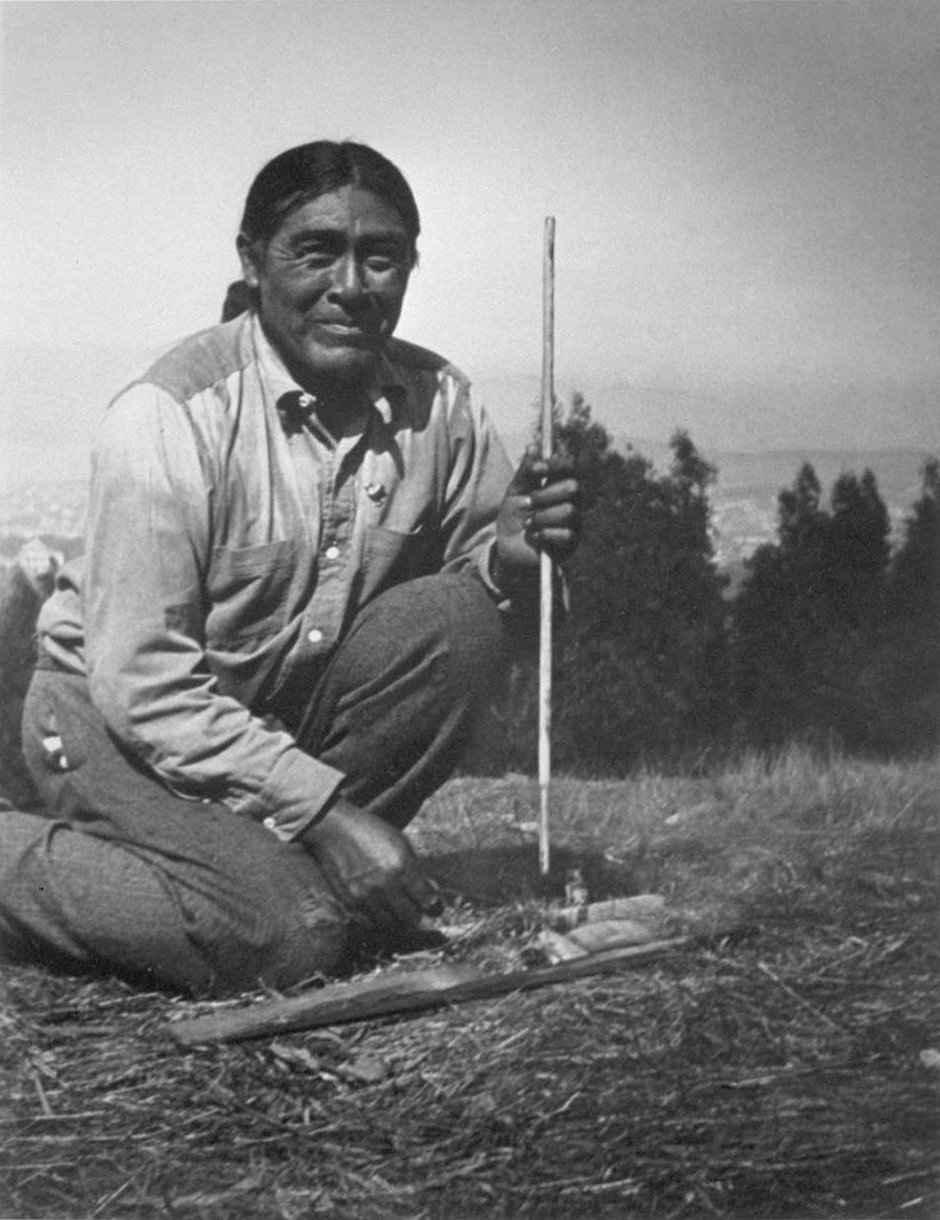
Ishi with fire drill, 1914, Parnassus Heights

Steven Shackley of UC Berkeley learned in 1994 of a paper by Jerald Johnson, who noted morphological evidence that Ishi's facial features and height were more typical of the Wintu and Maidu. He theorized that under pressure of diminishing populations, members of groups that were once enemies had intermarried to survive. Johnson also referred to oral histories of the Wintu and Maidu that told of the tribes' intermarrying with the Yahi. The theory is still debated, and this remains unresolved.

In 1996, Shackley announced work based on a study of Ishi's projectile points and those of the northern tribes. He had found that points made by Ishi were not typical of those recovered from historical Yahi sites. Because Ishi's production was more typical of points of the Nomlaki or Wintu tribes, and markedly dissimilar to those of Yahi, Shackley suggested that Ishi had been of mixed ancestry, and related to and raised among members of another of the tribes. He based his conclusion on a study of the points made by Ishi, compared to others held by the museum from the Yahi, Nomlaki and Wintu cultures.

Among Ishi's techniques was the use of what is known as an Ishi stick, used to run long pressure flakes. This is known to be a traditional technique of the Nomlaki and Wintu tribes. Shackley suggests that Ishi learned the skill directly from a male relative of one of those tribes. These people lived in small bands, close to the Yahi. They were historically competitors with and enemies of the Yahi.

== Legacy and honors ==
- The Last Yahi Indian Historical landmark, Oro Quincy Highway & Oak Avenue, Oroville, California
- Ishi is revered by flintknappers as probably one of the last two native stone toolmakers in North America. His techniques are widely imitated by knappers. Ethnographic accounts of his toolmaking are considered to be the Rosetta Stone of lithic tool manufacture.
- Kroeber and Waterman's 148 wax cylinder recordings (totaling 5 hours and 41 minutes) of Ishi speaking, singing, and telling stories in the Yahi language were selected by the Library of Congress as a 2010 addition to the National Recording Registry. This is an annual selection of recordings that are "culturally, historically, or aesthetically significant".
- Writer and critic Gerald Vizenor led a campaign to have the courtyard in Dwinelle Hall at the University of California, Berkeley renamed as "Ishi Court".
- The Ishi Wilderness Area in northeastern California, believed to be the ancestral grounds of his tribe, is named in his honor.
- Ishi Giant, an exceptionally large giant sequoia discovered by naturalist Dwight M. Willard in 1993, is named in his honor.
- Ishi was the subject of a portrait relief sculpture by Thomas Marsh in his 1990 work, Called to Rise, featuring twenty such panels of noteworthy San Franciscans, on the facade of the 25-story high-rise at 235 Pine Street, San Francisco.
- Anthropologists at the University of California, Berkeley wrote a letter in 1999 apologizing for Ishi's treatment.

== Representation in popular culture ==
=== Films ===
- Ishi: The Last of His Tribe, aired December 20, 1978, on NBC, with Eloy Casados as Ishi, written by Christopher Trumbo and Dalton Trumbo, and directed by Robert Ellis Miller.
- The Last of His Tribe (1992), with Graham Greene as Ishi, is a Home Box Office movie.
- Ishi: The Last Yahi (1993), is a documentary film by Jed Riffe.
- In Search of History: Ishi, the Last of His Kind (1998), television documentary about him.

=== Literature ===
- Apperson, Eva Marie Englent (1971). "We Knew Ishi". Red Bluff, California: Walker Lithograph Co.
  - daughter-in-law of "One-Eyed" Jack Apperson, who in 1908, sacked Ishi's Yahi village
- Collins, David R.; Bergren, Kristen (2000). Ishi: The Last of His People. Greensboro, NC: Morgan Reynolds. ISBN 978-1-883846-54-1. OCLC 43520986. (Young Adult Biography)
- Kroeber wrote about Ishi in two books:
  - Kroeber, Theodora; Kroeber, Karl (2002). Ishi in Two Worlds: a biography of the last wild Indian in North America. Berkeley: University of California Press. ISBN 978-0-520-22940-2. OCLC 50805975.
    - A mass-market, second-hand account of Ishi's life story, published in 1961, after the death of her husband Alfred, who had worked with Ishi, but had refused to write or talk about him.
  - Ishi: Last of His Tribe. Illus. Ruth Robbins. (1964). Parnassus Press, Berkeley, California.
    - a juvenile fiction version of his life.
  - Ishi the Last Yahi: A Documentary History (1981), edited by Robert Heizer and Theodora Kroeber, contains additional scholarly materials
- Merton, Thomas (1976). Ishi Means Man. Unicorn keepsake series. Vol. 8. Greensboro, N.C.: Unicorn Press.

Novels

- Othmar Franz Lang. Meine Spur löscht der Fluss (young adult novel in German)
- Lawrence Holcomb. The Last Yahi: A Novel About Ishi.

=== Stage productions ===
- Ishi (2008), a play written and directed by John Fisher, was performed from July 3–27, 2008, at Theatre Rhinoceros in San Francisco. The San Francisco Chronicle review said the work "is a fierce dramatic indictment of the ugliest side of California history."

=== Music ===
Depicted in the video for "Blue Train Lines," a song by Mount Kimbie and King Krule. The video follows the story of the two anthropologists falling out. One proceeds to sell all of Ishi's possessions on eBay.

=== Comics ===
- Osamu Tezuka: The story of Ishi the primitive man, (first appeared in Weekly-Shonen-Sunday, Shogakkan in Japan, issue of October 20, 1975, total 44 pages).

== See also ==
- Ishi Wilderness, Yahi tribe lands, now a wilderness area located in the Lassen National Forest
- Juana Maria, the last known member of the Nicoleño tribe
- Man of the Hole, the last known member of an uncontacted tribe
- Uncontacted peoples
- Shanawdithit and Demasduit were the last members of the Beothuk people of Newfoundland and Labrador
- Squanto, the last member of the Patuxet people of Massachusetts
