= Yana language =

Extinct language of California

Yana
- Yana Texts
- Native to: United States
- Region: California
- Ethnicity: Yana
- Extinct: 1916, with the death of Ishi
- Language family: Hokan?: Yana
- Dialects: Northern; Central; Southern; Yahi

Language codes
- ISO 639-3: ynn
- Glottolog: yana1271
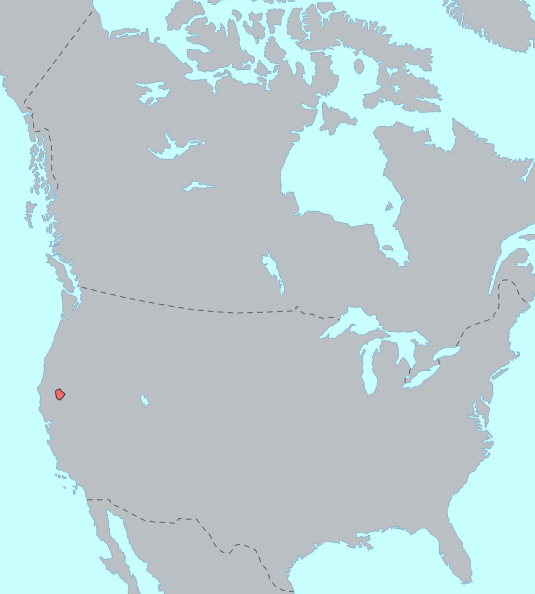
- Pre-contact distribution of the Yana language

The Yana language (also Yanan) is an extinct language that was formerly spoken by the Yana people, who lived in north-central California between the Feather and Pit rivers in what is now the Shasta and Tehama counties. The last speaker of the southernmost dialect, which is called Yahi, was Ishi, who died in 1916. When the last fluent speaker(s) of the other dialects died is not recorded. Yana is fairly well documented, mostly by Edward Sapir.

The names Yana and Yahi are derived from ya "people" plus an obligatory suffix, -na in the northern two dialects and -hi or -xi in the southern two dialects.

== Regional variation ==
There are four known dialects:

- Northern Yana
- Central Yana
- Southern Yana
  - (Southern) Yahi

Yahi song performed by Ishi, 1911–1912

Northern Yana, Central Yana, and Yahi were well recorded by Edward Sapir through work with Betty Brown, Sam Batwi, and Ishi respectively. Only a small collection of words and phrases of Southern Yana (more properly, Northern Yahi) were recorded by Sapir in his work with Sam Batwi, who spoke the dialect only in his childhood. Because Southern Yana is poorly attested, it is unclear how many additional subdialects there may have been.

Northern and Central Yana are close, differing mainly in phonology (mostly by innovations in Northern Yana), and Southern Yana and Yahi are similarly close. The two pairs differ from each other in phonological, lexical, and grammatical elements, and can only be understood by the other side with difficulty.

== Classification ==
Yana is often classified in the Hokan superstock. Sapir suggested a grouping of Yana within a Northern Hokan sub-family with Karuk, Chimariko, Shastan, Palaihnihan, and Pomoan. Contemporary linguists generally consider Yana to be a language isolate.

== Characteristics ==
Yana employs 22 consonants and 5 vowels. It is polysynthetic and agglutinative, with a subject-verb-object word order. Verbs contain much meaning through affixation. Like some other California languages, direction is very important: All verbs of motion must contain a different directional affix.

Unlike other languages of the region, Yana has different word forms used by male and female speakers. This is not used in the Yahi dialect, however.

The body of linguistic work on Yana is fortunate to include a number of texts and stories. Linguist Jean Perry writes that:

"Stylistically, the emphasis on direction and location, plus the frequent use of repetition, are traditional and integral to the style and structure of the text and are a necessary part of it ... . There are also many references to things and people that may seem vague. The level of presumed knowledge in a Yahi story is much higher than in English narration, because these people lived in a small, face-to-face society, and stories were told over and over. A native audience would be familiar with the characters and plot, and therefore much of the emphasis is on detail and technique rather than plot."

== Phonology ==
=== Consonants ===
		Bilabial	Alveolar			Palatal	Velar	Glottal
		Bilabial	plain	sib./rho.	lateral	Palatal	Velar	Glottal
Plosive/ Affricate	tenuis	p	t	t͡s			k	ʔ
Plosive/ Affricate	aspirated	pʰ	tʰ	t͡sʰ			kʰ	
Plosive/ Affricate	ejective	pʼ	tʼ	t͡sʼ			kʼ	
Fricative				s			x	h
Sonorant	plain	m	n	r	l	j	w	
Sonorant	glottalic	ˀm	ˀn		ˀl	ˀj	ˀw	

=== Vowels ===
	Front		Central		Back	
	short	long	short	long	short	long
Close	i	iː			u	uː
Open-mid	ɛ	ɛː			ɔ	ɔː
Open			a	aː		

- Sapir (1910)'s comparanda with vowels of English, French and German clearly indicate that the mid vowels are open-mid.

== Bibliography ==
- Campbell, Lyle. (1997). American Indian languages: The historical linguistics of Native America. New York: Oxford University Press. ISBN 0-19-509427-1.
- Goddard, Ives (Ed.). (1996). Languages. Handbook of North American Indians (W. C. Sturtevant, General Ed.) (Vol. 17). Washington, D. C.: Smithsonian Institution. ISBN 0-16-048774-9.
- Mithun, Marianne. (1999). The languages of Native North America. Cambridge: Cambridge University Press. ISBN 0-521-23228-7 (hbk); ISBN 0-521-29875-X.
- Sapir, Edward. (1922). The Fundamental Elements of Northern Yana. University of California Publications in American Archaeology and Ethnology 13. 215–234. Berkeley: Univ. of California Press.
- Sapir, Edward. 1910. Yana Texts. University of California Publications in American Archaeology and Ethnology, vol. 1, no. 9. Berkeley: University Press. (Online version at the Internet Archive).
- Sturtevant, William C. (Ed.). (1978–present). Handbook of North American Indians (Vol. 1–20). Washington, D. C.: Smithsonian Institution. (Vols. 1–3, 16, 18–20 not yet published).
