= Karl Kroeber =

American literary scholar (1926–2006)

Karl Kroeber (November 24, 1926 – November 8, 2009) was an American literary scholar, known for his writing on the English Romantics and American Indian literature. He was the son of Theodora and Alfred L. Kroeber, both anthropologists. He wrote an account of his father's work with Ishi called Ishi in Three Centuries.

He was professor of English and comparative literature at Columbia University. He wrote widely on literary criticism and its relationship to ecology, traditional literature, and art history.

Kroeber was the brother of the science fiction writer Ursula K. Le Guin. He was father of Paul Kroeber, a linguist; Arthur Kroeber, a journalist and consultant on the Chinese economy; and Katharine Kroeber Wiley, a writer.

Kroeber died of cancer on November 8, 2009, at the age of 82.

== Publications ==
=== Books ===
- Romantic Narrative Art. Madison: University of Wisconsin Press, 1960. OCLC: 305135
- Styles in Fictional Structure: The Art of Jane Austen, Charlotte Brontë, George Eliot. Princeton, N.J.: Princeton University Press, 1971. ISBN 0-691-06191-2
- Romantic Landscape Vision: Constable and Wordsworth. Madison: University of Wisconsin Press, 1975. ISBN 0-299-06710-6
- Traditional Literatures of the American Indian: Texts and Interpretations, ed., 1981. Lincoln: University of Nebraska Press.
- British Romantic Art. Berkeley: University of California Press, 1986. ISBN 0-520-05484-9
- Romantic Fantasy and Science Fiction New Haven: Yale University Press, 1988. ISBN 0-300-04241-8
- Retelling/Rereading: the Fate of Storytelling in Modern Times. New Brunswick, N.J.: Rutgers University Press, 1992 ISBN 0-8135-1765-6
- Ecological Literary Criticism: Romantic Imagining and the Biology of Mind. New York: Columbia University Press, 1994. ISBN 0-231-10028-0
- Artistry in Native American Myths. Lincoln: University of Nebraska Press, 1998. ISBN 0-8032-2737-X
- Ishi in Three Centuries, with Clifton Kroeber. Lincoln: University of Nebraska Press, 2003. ISBN 0-8032-2757-4
- Native American Storytelling: A Reader of Myths and Legends.Ed. Oxford: Blackwell, 2004.
- Make Believe in Film and Fiction: Visual vs. Verbal Storytelling. Palgrave Macmillan; 2006.
- Blake in a Post-Secular Era: Early Prophecies. Romantic Circles, 2012.

=== Selected essays ===
- "The Evolution of Literary Study", 1883–1983 PMLA, Vol. 99, No. 3, Centennial Issue (May, 1984), pp. 326–339
