= George W. Stocking Jr. =

German-American historian (1928–2013)

- Born: December 28, 1928
- Died: July 13, 2013 (aged 84)
- Occupation: Anthropologist

Academic background
- Education: Harvard University (B.A. in English Literatura, 1949); University of Pennsylvania (Ph.D. in American Civilization, 1960)

Academic work
- Discipline: Anthropology
- Sub-discipline: History of Anthropology
- Institutions: University of Chicago

George W. Stocking Jr. (December 28, 1928 – July 13, 2013) was a German-born American scholar noted for his scholarship on the history of anthropology.

== Early life and education ==
Stocking was born in Berlin, Germany in 1928. His father, the economist George W. Stocking Sr., was conducting research on the German potash industry. Stocking senior moved frequently to take different academic positions, as well as to conduct research and undertake policy and applied work. As a result, George Stocking Jr. moved around frequently as a child. The majority of his childhood, however, was spent in Texas, where his father was a professor at the University of Texas at Austin. He graduated from high school in New York, however, where he graduated from Horace-Mann Lincoln School in 1944.

== Career ==
Stocking went on to attend Harvard University. He graduated from Harvard in 1949. From 1949 to 1956 he was a member of the Communist Party, taking a number of jobs in manufacturing and industry an attempt to organize workers. Eventually Stocking grew disaffected with politics, and in 1957 he entered graduate school at the University of Pennsylvania. There, he was a student in the interdisciplinary program on "American Civilization", where he was a student of A. Irving Hallowell. In 1960 he earned his Ph.D. with a dissertation entitled "American Social Scientists and Race Theory: 1890–1915". Stocking's work was a content analysis of articles written by academics and intellectuals, and was influenced by social-scientific thought current in the American Civilization program at the time. Nevertheless, his work is usually classified as history and he is usually considered a historian.

Stocking's first academic position was at the University of California Berkeley, where he was hired in 1959 as a social historian. He subsequently taught for a semester at the University of Pennsylvania in 1967. In 1968 Stocking took a position at the University of Chicago, where he had a joint appointment in the departments of anthropology and history for some years. He moved to a full position in anthropology in 1974.

Stocking's scholarly work takes several forms. He has published several volumes which anthologize already-published journal articles. These include Race, Culture, and Evolution (1968), The Ethnographer's Magic (1992), and Delimiting Anthropology (2001). Stocking has also edited the work of other scholars. Work in this vein includes The Shaping of American Anthropology (1974), an anthology of writings by Franz Boas. as well as Selected Papers from the American Anthropologist (1976). Most notably, he was the editor in chief of the annual book series "History of Anthropology" published by the University of Wisconsin Press. In 1973, in conjunction with Robert Bieder and Judith Modell, he founded the History of Anthropology Newsletter as "a medium of communication for active researchers in this area" providing "information as to archival holdings, bibliographic aids, research in progress, recent publications, and so on."

In addition to these works, Stocking has produced several monographs. Most notably these include two volumes which trace the history of British anthropology: Victorian Anthropology (1987) and After Tylor (1995). He has also written an autobiography, Glimpses into my own Black Box (2010) and the exhibition catalog Anthropology at Chicago (1979).

== Criticism ==
In 1964, Stocking published an influential article entitled ‘French Anthropology in 1800’, in the journal Isis (vol. 55, part. 2, no. 180, pp. 134–50). In it, he mistakenly suggested that the French zoologist François Péron was an advocate of polygenism. He was challenged by Péron's biographer, Edward Duyker, who asserted that ‘one of Péron’s most significant anthropological findings’ was the recognition of ‘strong physical and cultural differences’ between the inhabitants of Tasmania and mainland Australia. These differences, and the absence of the dingo in Tasmania, led Péron to conclude, in a memoir he presented to the Institut de France, that ‘la séparation de ces deux régions doit remonter à une époque beaucoup plus ancienne qu’on ne pourroit le soupçonner d’abord’ [‘the separation of these two regions must have dated from an époque very much more ancient than one could suspect at first’]. Duyker pointed out that Stocking had mistranslated this crucial statement as: ‘before the epoch of the population of these countries’, to justify his erroneous assertion about Péron's belief in distinct human creations.

== Later life and death ==
Stocking was a professor emeritus in the Department of Anthropology at the University of Chicago. He died in 2013 after years of declining health.

== Legacy ==
Upon his death, an article in the Indian Country Today Media Network called Stocking "The Man Who Forced Anthropologists to Respect Native Cultures".

== Bibliography ==
In addition to the titles listed below Stocking has edited many works, been the editor of the series History of Anthropology, and contributed to many journals. Some of his essays are collected in Race, Culture and Evolution, The Ethnographer's Magic and Delimiting Anthropology. A complete bibliography of his works is in his autobiography Glimpses Into My Own Black Box.

- 1968 Race, Culture, and Evolution: Essays in the History of Anthropology. ISBN 0-02-931530-1
- 1974 The Shaping of American Anthropology, 1883–1911: A Franz Boas Reader.
- 1982 Race, Culture, and Evolution: Essays in the History of Anthropology. [reprint with new preface]. ISBN 0-226-77494-5
- 1987 Victorian Anthropology. ISBN 0-02-931550-6 1991 pbk reprint
- 1992 The Ethnographer's Magic and Other Essays in the History of Anthropology. ISBN 0-299-13410-5
- 1995 After Tylor: British Social Anthropology 1888–1951. ISBN 0-299-14580-8
- 2001 Delimiting Anthropology: Occasional Essays and Reflections. ISBN 0-299-17450-6
- 2010 Glimpses Into My Own Black Box. ISBN 978-0-299-24984-7
