= Alfred Kroeber =

American anthropologist (1876–1960)

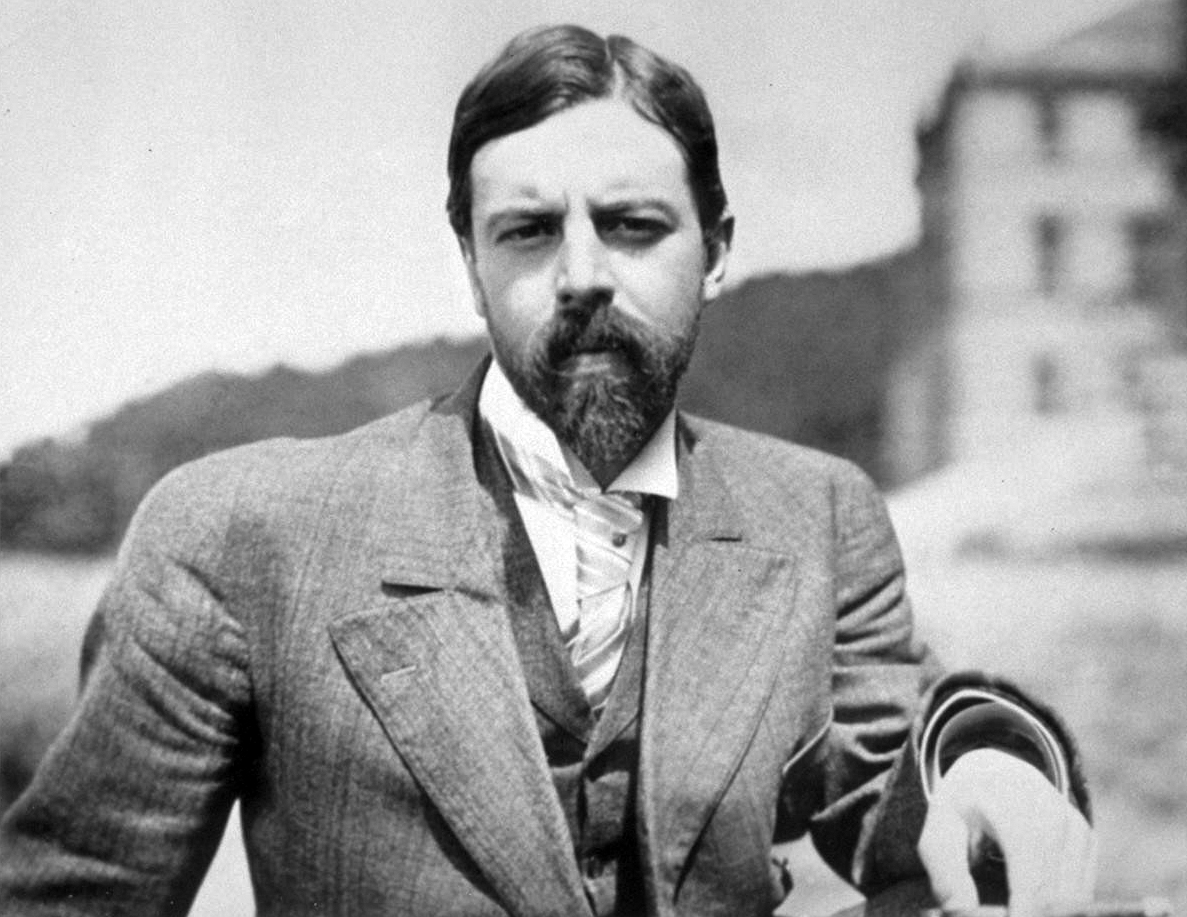
- Kroeber in 1920
- Born: Alfred Louis Kroeber; June 11, 1876; Hoboken, New Jersey, U.S.
- Died: October 5, 1960 (aged 84); Paris, France
- Spouses: Henrietta Rothschild (m. 1906; died 1913); Theodora Kracaw Brown (m. 1926)
- Children: 4, including Karl and Ursula
- Awards: Viking Fund Medal (1946)

Academic background
- Education: Columbia University (BA, MA, PhD)
- Thesis: Decorative symbolism of the Arapaho
- Doctoral advisor: Franz Boas

Academic work
- Discipline: Anthropology
- Sub-discipline: Cultural anthropology
- Institutions: University of California, Berkeley
- Doctoral students: Cora Du Bois, Margaret Lantis, Katharine Luomala, Laura Maud Thompson, Charles F. Voegelin
- Influenced: H. Stuart Hughes

Alfred Louis Kroeber (/ˈkroʊbər/ KROH-bər; June 11, 1876 – October 5, 1960) was an American cultural anthropologist. He received his PhD under Franz Boas at Columbia University in 1901, the first doctorate in anthropology awarded by Columbia. He was also the first professor appointed to the Department of Anthropology at the University of California, Berkeley. He played an integral role in the early days of its Museum of Anthropology, where he served as director from 1909 through 1947. Kroeber provided detailed information about Ishi, the last surviving member of the Yahi people, whom he studied over a period of years. He was the father of the author Ursula K. Le Guin.

== Life ==
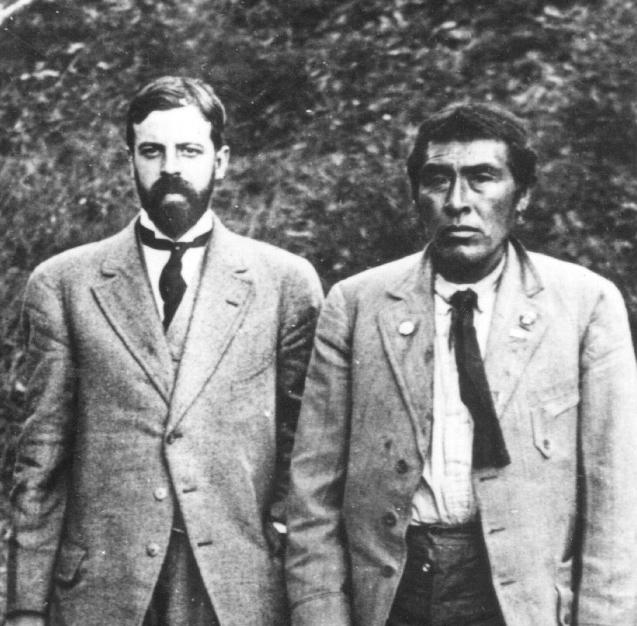
Kroeber (left) with Ishi in 1911

Kroeber was born in Hoboken, New Jersey, to parents of German Protestant origin. His mother, Johanna Mueller (or Muller), was an American descended from German immigrants after 1848, sister to three brothers, including Hermann (the father of Hermann Joseph Muller) and Otto (the grandfather of Herbert J. Muller). Kroeber's father, Florenz (or Florence) Friederick Martin Kroeber, came to the United States from Germany at the age of ten, with his parents and family, and became an importer of French clocks as his wife's father, Nicholas Mueller. The family belonged to a German-American milieu that was upper middle-class, classical and rationalistic, and schooled in the German intellectual tradition.

Alfred's family moved into New York City when Alfred was quite young, and he was tutored and attended private schools there. He had three younger siblings and all had scholarly interests; his sister Elsbeth became a biology teacher, while his sister Johanna Kroeber Mosenthal was a paleontology research assistant at the American Museum of Natural History for almost thirty years. The family was bilingual, speaking German at home, and Kroeber also began to study Latin and Greek in school, beginning a lifelong interest in languages. He attended Columbia College at the age of 16, joining the Philolexian Society and earning a BA in English in 1896 and an MA in Romantic drama in 1897. Changing fields to the new one of anthropology, he received his PhD under Franz Boas at Columbia University in 1901, basing his 28-page dissertation on decorative symbolism on his field work among the Arapaho. It was the first doctorate in anthropology awarded by Columbia.

Kroeber spent most of his career in California, primarily at the University of California, Berkeley. He was both a professor of Anthropology and the Director of what was then the University of California Museum of Anthropology (now the Phoebe A. Hearst Museum of Anthropology). The anthropology department's headquarters building at the University of California was named Kroeber Hall in his honor, before being unnamed January 26, 2021, in order to "help Berkeley recognize a challenging part of our history, while better supporting the diversity of today's academic community." He was associated with Berkeley until his retirement in 1946. He died in Paris on October 5, 1960.

== Influence ==
Although he is known primarily as a cultural anthropologist, he did significant work in archaeology and anthropological linguistics, and he contributed to anthropology by making connections between archaeology and culture. He conducted excavations in New Mexico, Mexico, and Peru. In Peru he helped found the Institute for Andean Studies (IAS) with the Peruvian anthropologist Julio C. Tello and other major scholars.

Kroeber and his students did important work collecting cultural data on western tribes of Native Americans. The work done in preserving information about Californian tribes appeared in Handbook of the Indians of California (1925). In that book, Kroeber first described a pattern in Californian groups where a social unit was smaller and less hierarchically organized than a tribe, which was elaborated upon in The Patwin and their Neighbors in which Kroeber first coined the term "tribelet" to describe this level of organization. Kroeber is credited with developing the concepts of culture area, cultural configuration (Cultural and Natural Areas of Native North America, 1939), and cultural fatigue (Anthropology, 1963).

Kroeber influenced many of his contemporaries in his views as a cultural historian. During his lifetime, he was known as the "Dean of American Anthropologists". Kroeber and Roland B. Dixon were very influential in the genetic classification of Native American languages in North America, being responsible for theoretical groupings such as Penutian and Hokan, based on common languages.

He is noted for working with Ishi, who was claimed to be the last California Yahi Indian. (Ishi may have been of mixed ethnic heritage, with a father from the Wintun, Maidu or Nomlaki tribes.) His second wife, Theodora Kracaw Kroeber, wrote a well-known biography of Ishi, Ishi in Two Worlds.

Kroeber's textbook, Anthropology (1923, 1948), was widely used for many years. In the late 1940s, it was one of ten books required as reading for all students during their first year at Columbia University. His book, Configurations of Cultural Growth (1944), had a lasting impact on social scientific research on genius and greatness; Kroeber believed that genius arose out of culture at particular times, rather than holding to the "great man theory".

Kroeber's childhood friend Carl Alsberg described him as a "good listener" and able "to be objective, to see the other point of view, to penetrate behind another person's behavior to his underlying thought [...] These traits indicate a sincerity and simplicity of character that primitive peoples sense at once and to which they respond by giving their confidence."

From 1920 to 1923 Kroeber conducted an active practice as a lay psychoanalyst, with an office in San Francisco.

== Indian land claims ==
Kroeber served early on as the plaintiffs' director of research in Indians of California v. the United States, a land claim case. Omer Stewart of the University of Colorado served as associate director. Ralph Beals of the University of California, Los Angeles, served as director of research for the federal government in the case. Both men were former students of Kroeber. Kroeber's impact on the Indian Claims Commission may well have established the way expert witnesses presented testimony before the tribunal. Several of his former students also served as expert witnesses; for instance, Stewart directed the plaintiff research for the Ute and for the Shoshone peoples.

== Personal life ==
Kroeber married Henrietta Rothschild in 1906. She contracted tuberculosis and died in 1913, after several years of illness.

In 1926 he married again, to Theodora Kracaw Brown, a widow who had been a student in one of his graduate seminars. They had two children: Karl Kroeber, a literary critic, and the science fiction writer Ursula Kroeber Le Guin. In addition, Alfred adopted Theodora's sons by her first marriage, Ted and Clifton Brown, who both took his surname.

In 2003, Clifton and Karl Kroeber published a book of essays on Ishi's story, which they co-edited, called, Ishi in Three Centuries. This is the first scholarly book on Ishi to contain essays by Native American writers and academics.

After her husband's death, Theodora Kroeber wrote a biography of him, titled Alfred Kroeber: A Personal Configuration. It was published by the University of California Press in 1970. David G. Mandelbaum, a cultural anthropologist and former colleague of Alfred, stated that this biography was just as important a work from an anthropologist's perspective as Ishi in Two Worlds.

== In fiction ==
Kroeber appears as a minor character in Francis Spufford's novel CAHOKIA JAZZ (2023).

Kroeber's relationship with Ishi was the subject of a film, The Last of His Tribe (1992), starring Jon Voight as Kroeber and Graham Greene as Ishi.

== Awards and honors ==
- Fellow of the American Academy of Arts and Sciences (1912)
- Kroeber received five honorary degrees (Yale, California, Harvard, Columbia, Chicago)
- He was awarded two gold medals.
- He held honorary membership in 16 scientific societies.
- President of the American Anthropological Association (1917–1918)
- Member of the United States National Academy of Sciences (1928)
- Member of the American Philosophical Society (1941)

== Partial list of works ==
- Indian Myths of South Central California (1907), in University of California Publications in American Archaeology and Ethnology 4:167–250. Berkeley.
- The Religion of the Indians of California (1907), in University of California Publications in American Archaeology and Ethnology 4:6.
- Kroeber, Alfred Louis; Waterman, Thomas Talbot; Sapir, Edward; Sparkman, Philip Stedman (January–March 1908). "Notes on California folk-lore". Journal of American Folklore. 21 (80): 35–42. doi:10.2307/534527. hdl:2027/uc1.31822005860226. JSTOR 534527.
- Handbook of the Indians of California (1925), Washington, D.C.: Bureau of American Ethnology Bulletin No. 78
- "Native American Population" (1934) in American Anthropologist, Vol. 36, No. 1.
- The Nature of Culture (1952). University of Chicago.
- with Clyde Kluckhohn: Culture. A Critical Review of Concepts and Definitions (1952). Cambridge.
- Paracas Cavernas and Chavin (1953). Letras (Lima), 19(49), 49–71.
- Style and Civilizations Westport Conn.: Greenwood, 1957.
- Anthropology: Culture Patterns & Processes (1963). New York: Harcourt, Brace & World (earlier editions in 1923 and 1948).

== See also ==
- List of presidents of the Linguistic Society of America
