= David G. Mandelbaum =

American anthropologist (1911-1987)

David Goodman Mandelbaum (August 22, 1911, in Chicago – April 19, 1987) was an American anthropologist.

He majored in anthropology at Northwestern University, studying with Melville J. Herskovits. His major published work dealt with the Plains Cree people of Saskatchewan, Canada and he was well regarded for his study of society in India. He earned his doctorate at Yale University in 1936.

He taught at University of Minnesota (1941–1946), University of California (1946–1978), and was an active professor emeritus at the latter until his death in 1987 from cancer.

== Selected works ==
- The Plains Cree: an Ethnographic, Historical, and Comparative study, New York: American Museum of Natural History. (1940) reissued by AMS Press Inc., New York ISBN 978-0-404-15626-8
- --do.--Regina: Canadian Plains Research Center, University of Regina, 1978 Based on the author's thesis, Yale, 1936. Part 1 was previously published in 1940 by the American Museum of Natural History.
- "Alcohol and Culture", Current Anthropology; Vol. 6, No. 3. Chicago (June 1965) The University of Chicago Press on behalf of Wenner-Gren Foundation for Anthropological Research; online
- Society in India, Berkeley (1972) University of California Press. ISBN 978-0-520-01895-2

== See also ==
Fine-Day – his principal informant on "The Plains Cree"
