= Phoebe A. Hearst Museum of Anthropology =

- Former name: Robert H. Lowie Museum of Anthropology
- Established: 1901
- Location: University of California, Berkeley, California, United States
- Coordinates: 37°52′11″N 122°15′18.47″W
- Type: anthropology museum
- Accreditation: American Alliance of Museums
- Website: hearstmuseum.berkeley.edu

The Phoebe A. Hearst Museum of Anthropology (formerly the Robert H. Lowie Museum of Anthropology) is an anthropology museum located in Berkeley, California, on the University of California, Berkeley, campus.

== History ==
Founded in 1901 under the patronage of Phoebe Apperson Hearst, the original goal of the museum was to support systematic collecting efforts by archaeologists and ethnologists in order to support a department of anthropology at the University of California. The museum was originally located in San Francisco from 1903 (open to the public as of 1911) until 1931, when it moved to the campus of the University of California, Berkeley. On the Berkeley campus, the museum was located in the former Civil Engineering Building until 1959, when, as the Robert H. Lowie Museum of Anthropology, it was moved to the newly built Kroeber Hall. For decades, the museum was considered as having the largest collection of its kind on the west coast. In 1991, the museum's name was changed to recognize the essential role of Phoebe Apperson Hearst as founder and patron. Today the museum functions as a research unit of the University of California.

Many notable names in American anthropology have been associated with the museum. These include the museum's first director Frederic Ward Putnam, the anthropologists Alfred L. Kroeber, Robert Lowie, and William Bascom, paleoanthropologists Francis Clark Howell and Tim D. White, Egyptologists Klaus Baer and Cathleen Keller, and archaeologists Max Uhle, George Reisner, John Howland Rowe, J. Desmond Clark, David Stronach, Crawford Hallock Greenewalt Jr. and Patrick Vinton Kirch. It was also the final residence of Ishi, who lived there, in San Francisco, from 1911 until his death in 1916.

== Collections ==
The museum houses an estimated 3 million objects plus extensive documentation that includes fieldnotes, photographs, and sound and film recordings.

Major collections include:

- Approximately 9,000 California Indian baskets, representing almost every tribe in California and all of the region's basketry techniques.
- A broad collection of approximately 20,000 ancient Egyptian artifacts, with special emphasis on the various predynastic cultures. The core of this collection comes from excavations carried out by George Reisner between 1899 and 1905.
- A large Peruvian collection, especially strong in pottery and textiles, including 9,200 objects collected by Max Uhle at the turn of the century.
- Approximately 32,000 African artifacts collected under anthropologist William Bascom and his students, and from the excavations of archaeologist J. Desmond Clark.
- An important collection of Oceanic objects, including collections from the Trobriand Islands made by Bronislaw Malinowski in the early 1900s and archaeological collections from excavations in Fiji and New Caledonia undertaken by E.W. Gifford in the 1940s and 1950s.
- Nearly 4,000 Etruscan objects make the Hearst's collection one of, or if not, the largest North American collection of Etruscan artifacts.

== Programs and activities ==
In addition to supporting scholarly research and publication, the museum mounts exhibitions in a gallery located on the UC Berkeley campus and sponsors public educational programs.

The Phoebe A. Hearst Museum of Anthropology is accredited by the American Alliance of Museums.

== Directors ==
The Hearst Museum's directors have regularly been practicing anthropologists:

- Frederic W. Putnam (1903–09)
- Alfred L. Kroeber (curator, 1908–1925; director, 1925–46)
- Edward W. Gifford (1947–55)
- George M. Foster (acting director, 1955–57)
- William R. Bascom (1957–79)
- James Deetz (1979–88)
- Burton Benedict (1988–94)
- Rosemary Joyce (1994–99)
- Patrick Vinton Kirch (1999–2002)
- Douglas Sharon (2002–2006)
- Kent G. Lightfoot (acting director, 2006–2007)
- C. Judson King (acting director, 2007–2009)
- Mari Lyn Salvador (2009-2015)
- Benjamin W. Porter (2015-2020)
- Lauren Kroiz (2020-2022)
- Caroline Jean Fernald (executive director, 2019-2023)
