= Yana people =

Group of Native Americans

Yana
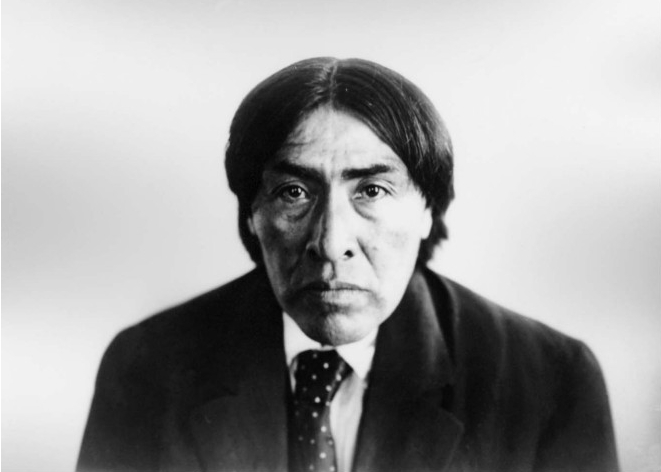
- Ishi (a Yahi/Yana Man) in 1912

Total population
- 127 (2020)

Regions with significant populations
- United States (California)

Languages
- English, formerly Yana

Related ethnic groups
- Yahi

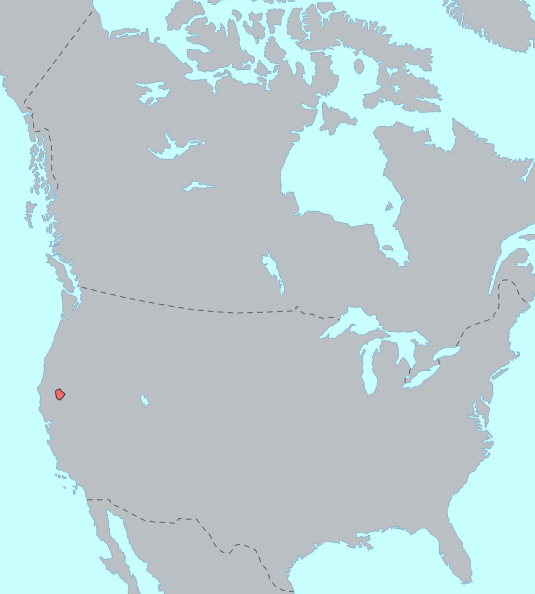
Pre-contact Yana territory

The Yana are a group of Native Americans indigenous to Northern California in the central Sierra Nevada, on the western side of the range. Their lands, prior to encroachment by white settlers, bordered the Pit and Feather Rivers. They were nearly destroyed during the California genocide in the latter half of the 19th century. Descendants of the Central and Southern Yana continue to live in California as members of Redding Rancheria.

== Etymology ==
The Yana-speaking people comprise four groups: the North Yana, the Central Yana, the Southern Yana, and the Yahi, two of which - the Central and Southern - have living descendants. The noun stem Ya- means "person"; the noun suffix is -na in the northern Yana dialects and -hi [xi] in the southern dialects.

== History ==
Anthropologist Alfred L. Kroeber put the 1770 population of the Yana at 1,500, and Sherburne F. Cook estimated their numbers at 1,900 and 1,850. Other estimates of the total Yana population before the Gold Rush exceed 3,000. They lived on wild game, salmon, fruit, acorns and roots.

Their territory was approximately 2,400 square miles, or more than 6,000 km^{2}, and contained mountain streams, gorges, boulder-strewn hills, and lush meadows. Each group had relatively distinct boundaries, dialects and customs.

Yana faced frequent massacres over the course of the California Genocide, which served to decimate their population. These included massacres at Cow Creek, Battle Creek, Millville, and Bear Creek.

When ethnographer Jeremiah Curtin came to the Upper Sacramento Valley to interview local white and indigenous individuals, he noted that a primary reason for the massacres of the Yana people was money, as the Yana often had between $40-$60, which they had earned from working on the settlers' farms. An informant told Curtin that a man had shown a friend of his over $400 he'd stolen from Yana people who had been killed.

=== 20th century ===
Redding Rancheria was created by the Bureau of Indian Affairs in 1922, and the Wintu, Pit River, and Yana tribes, which lived in the surrounding areas, proceeded to move into it. The Yana were one of the tribes who, in 1939, formed the Redding Rancheria Tribal Government.

== Yahi ==
The Yahi were the southernmost portion of the Yana. They were hunter-gatherers who lived in small egalitarian bands without centralized political authority, were reclusive and fiercely defended their territory of mountain canyons. The Yahi initially numbered around 400. The Yahi were the first Yana group to suffer from the Californian Gold Rush, as their lands were the closest to the gold fields. They suffered great population losses from the loss of their traditional food supplies and fought with the settlers over territory. They lacked firearms, and armed white settlers caused genocide against them in multiple wars. These wars took place as part of the California Genocide, during which the U.S. Army and vigilante militias carried out the relocation of thousands of aboriginal peoples in California. The wars reduced the Yahi, who were already suffering from starvation, to a population of less than 100. On August 6, 1865, seventeen settlers waged a war in Yahi village at dawn. In 1866, more Yahis were blown up when they were caught in a ravine. Circa 1867, 33 Yahis died after being tracked to a cave north of Mill Creek. Circa 1871, four cowboys defeated about 30 Yahis in Kingsley cave.

=== Ishi ===
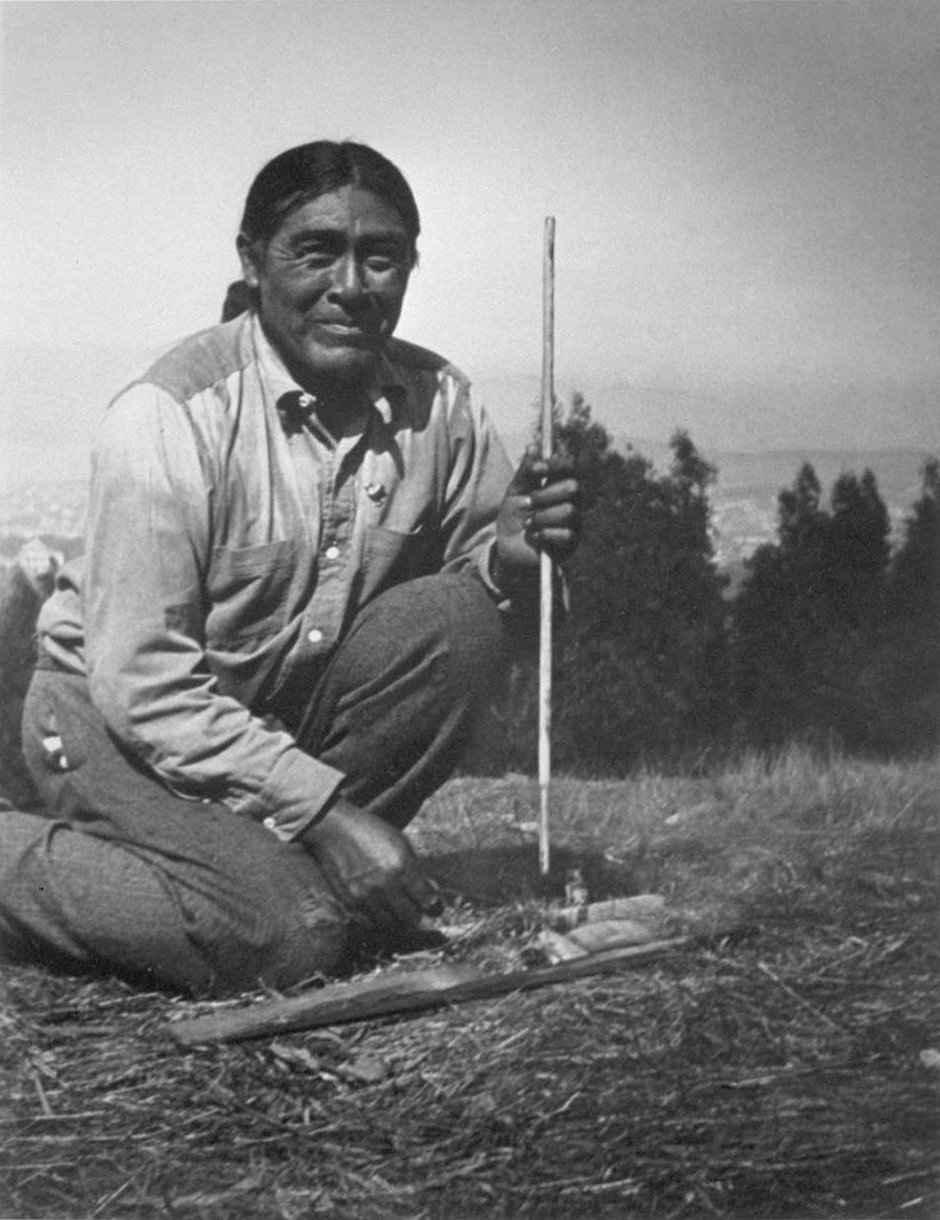
Ishi, the last known survivor of the Yahi

The last known survivor of the Yahi was named Ishi by American anthropologists. Ishi had spent most of his life hiding with his tribe members in the Sierra wilderness, emerging at the age of about 49, after the deaths of his mother and remaining relatives. He was the only Yahi known to Americans. Ishi emerged from the mountains near Oroville, California, on August 29, 1911, having lived his entire life outside of the settler-colonial culture. Ishi would teach Saxton T. Pope archery as referenced in Pope's book on archery by the last Yahi Indian. He died in 1916. In 1999, the Yana people, who were considered Ishi's closest relatives, received Ishi's brain, which had been kept at the Smithsonian, after the Museum was contacted by the Redding Rancheria and Pit River Tribe.

== Culture ==
The Yana tribe relied primarily on acorns collected in the autumn from the black oak tree as their main food source.

== See also ==
- Yana language
- Yana traditional narratives
- Indigenous peoples of California
