= Philology =

Study of language in historical sources

Philology (from Ancient Greek φιλολογία (philología) 'love of word') is the study of language in oral and written historical sources. It is the intersection of textual criticism, literary criticism, history, and linguistics with strong ties to etymology. Philology is also defined as the study of literary texts and oral and written records, the establishment of their authenticity and their original form, and the determination of their meaning. A person who pursues this kind of study is known as a philologist. In older usage, especially British, philology is conflated with comparative and historical linguistics, to which it is closely related.

Classical philology, a subfield of Classics, studies Classical languages. Classical philology principally originated from the Library of Pergamum and the Library of Alexandria around the fourth century BC during the Hellenistic Period, and was continued by the Ancient Greeks and the Ancient Romans during the Roman Republic and Roman Empire. Latin philology was maintained in the Latin West during the Middle Ages, while Greek/Hellenic philology was maintained in the Byzantine Empire during the same period. Greco-Roman philology was also practiced separately in the Islamic World during the Islamic Golden Age, though it eventually died out and was forgotten there in the centuries afterward. It was reunited and reinvigorated by European scholars of the Renaissance, where it was soon joined by philologies of other European (Romance, Germanic, Celtic, Slavic, Finnish, Hungarian, Armenian, Kartvelian, Etruscan, Albanian, etc.), Biblical, Ancient Near Eastern and Middle Eastern (Mesopotamian, Egyptian, Coptic, Hittite, Iranian, Arabic, Jewish, etc.) South Asian (Sanskrit, Dravidian), etc.), East Asian (Chinese, Japanese, Korean, Vietnamese, etc.), African (Ethiopian, Nubian, etc.), and Native American (e.g. Mayan) languages, among various others. Indo-European studies involve the comparative philology of all Indo-European languages, while Semitic studies, Indology, and East Asian studies do the same for Semitic languages, Indic languages, and East Asian languages, respectively, with many other similar disciplines existing. The invention and development of the discipline is polycentric, not exclusive to the Western world, though the word itself is of Western origin.

Though the terms philology and classical language were originally used to describe Greek and Latin and their study in the context of Western Classical studies, and later extended in the West to Biblical Hebrew in Biblical studies, any language with a historical record can be studied philologically, and describing a language as "classical" is to additionally imply the existence of a pre-modern philological tradition associated with it, due to the essential criteria used to define the concept. Edward Sapir was a notable early advocate of extending the term “classical language” to Non-Western languages and their literary and scholarly traditions.

Within linguistics, Philology, with its focus on historical development (diachronic analysis), is contrasted with Ferdinand de Saussure's insistence on the importance of synchronic analysis. While the contrast continued with the emergence of structuralism and the emphasis of Noam Chomsky on syntax, research in historical and comparative linguistics often relies on philological materials and findings, and historical and comparative linguistics are often considered subfields of it or vice versa. Philology is itself often considered a subfield of linguistics or a distinct, closely related discipline. J.R.R. Tolkien is one of the most iconic and recognized examples of a philologist, and the literary works of his mythopoeia were strongly influenced by his profession.

== Etymology ==
The term philology is derived from the Greek φιλολογία (philología), from the terms φίλος (phílos) 'love, affection, loved, beloved, dear, friend' and λόγος (lógos) 'word, articulation, reason', describing a love of learning, of literature, as well as of argument and reasoning, reflecting the range of activities included under the notion of λόγος. The term changed little with the Latin philologia, and later entered the English language in the 16th century, from the Middle French philologie, in the sense of 'love of literature'.

The adjective φιλόλογος (philólogos) meant 'fond of discussion or argument, talkative', in Hellenistic Greek, also implying an excessive ("sophistic") preference of argument over the love of true wisdom, φιλόσοφος (philósophos).

As an allegory of literary erudition, philologia appears in fifth-century postclassical literature (Martianus Capella, De nuptiis Philologiae et Mercurii), an idea revived in Late Medieval literature (Chaucer, Lydgate).

The meaning of "love of learning and literature" was narrowed to "the study of the historical development of languages" (historical linguistics) in 19th-century usage of the term. Due to the rapid progress made in understanding sound laws and language change, the "golden age of philology" lasted throughout the 19th century, or "from Giacomo Leopardi and Friedrich Schlegel to Nietzsche".

== Branches ==
=== Comparative ===
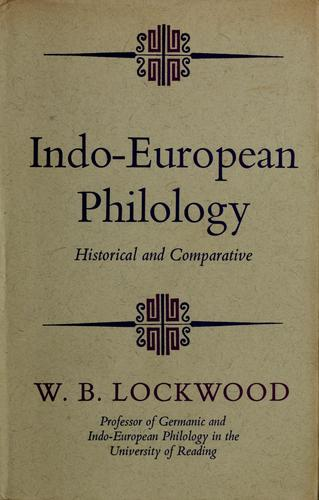
Cover of Indo-European Philology: Historical and Comparative by William Burley Lockwood (1969)

Philology's interest in ancient languages led ultimately to the deciphering, and the pursued study of what was, in the 19th century, "exotic" languages, for the light they could cast on understanding the origins of older texts. The comparative linguistics branch of philology studies the relationship between languages. Whereas speculation of a common ancestor language from which all these descended has its roots in the philologist's adherence to the biblical idea of humankind's common ancestry - the common ancestor language of Indo-European languages is now named Proto-Indo-European - no doubt this interest proved to be a dynamic factor. Similarities between Sanskrit and European languages were first noted in the early 19th century. This is noted in Juan Mascaró's introduction to his translation of the Bhagavad Gita, in which he dates the first Gita translation to 1785 (by Charles Williams). Mascaro claims the linguist Alexander Hamilton stopped in Paris in 1802 after returning from India, and taught Sanskrit to the German critic Friedrich von Schlegel. Mascaro holds this as the beginning of modern study of the roots of the Indo-European languages.

=== Textual ===
Philology also includes the study of texts and their history. It includes elements of textual criticism, trying to reconstruct an author's original text based on variant copies of manuscripts. This branch of research arose among ancient scholars in the Greek-speaking world of the 4th century BC, who desired to establish a standard text of popular authors for both sound interpretation and secure transmission. Since that time, the original principles of textual criticism have been improved and applied to other widely distributed texts such as the Bible. Scholars have tried to reconstruct the original readings of the Bible from the manuscript variants. This method was applied to classical studies and medieval texts as a way to reconstruct the author's original work. The method produced so-called "critical editions", which provided a reconstructed text accompanied by a "critical apparatus", i.e., footnotes that listed the various manuscript variants available, enabling scholars to gain insight into the entire manuscript tradition and argue about the variants.

A related study method known as higher criticism studies the authorship, date, and provenance of text to place such text in a historical context. As these philological issues are often inseparable from issues of interpretation, there is no clear-cut boundary between philology and hermeneutics. When text has a significant political or religious influence (such as the reconstruction of Biblical texts), scholars have difficulty reaching objective conclusions.

Some scholars avoid all critical methods of textual philology, especially in historical linguistics, where it is important to study the actual recorded materials. The movement known as new philology has rejected textual criticism because it injects editorial interpretations into the text and destroys the integrity of the individual manuscript, hence damaging the reliability of the data. Supporters of new philology insist on a strict "diplomatic" approach: a faithful rendering of the text exactly as found in the manuscript, without emendations.

=== Cognitive ===
Another branch of philology, cognitive philology, studies written and oral texts. Cognitive philology considers these oral texts as the results of human mental processes. This science compares the results of textual science with the results of experimental research of both psychology and artificial intelligence production systems.

=== Decipherment ===
In the case of Bronze Age literature, philology includes the prior decipherment of the language under study. This has notably been the case with the Egyptian, Sumerian, Assyrian, Hittite, Ugaritic, and Luwian languages. Beginning with the famous decipherment and translation of the Rosetta Stone by Jean-François Champollion in 1822, some individuals attempted to decipher the writing systems of the Ancient Near East and Aegean. In the case of Old Persian and Mycenaean Greek, decipherment yielded older records of languages already known from slightly more recent traditions (Middle Persian and Alphabetic Greek).

Work on the ancient languages of the Near East progressed rapidly. In the mid-19th century, Henry Rawlinson and others deciphered the Behistun Inscription, which records the same text in Old Persian, Elamite, and Akkadian, using a variation of cuneiform for each language. The elucidation of cuneiform led to the decipherment of Sumerian. Hittite was deciphered in 1915 by Bedřich Hrozný.

Linear B, a script used in the ancient Aegean, was deciphered in 1952 by Michael Ventris and John Chadwick, who demonstrated that it recorded an early form of Greek, now known as Mycenaean Greek. Linear A, the writing system that records the still-unknown language of the Minoans, resists deciphering, despite many attempts.

Work continues on scripts such as the Maya, with great progress since the initial breakthroughs of the phonetic approach championed by Yuri Knorozov and others in the 1950s. Since the late 20th century, the Maya code has been almost completely deciphered, and the Mayan languages are among the most documented and studied in Mesoamerica. The code is described as a logosyllabic style of writing.

== Contention ==
In the Anglo-Saxon world, use of the term "philology" to describe work on languages and works of literature, which had become synonymous with the practices of German scholars, was abandoned as a consequence of anti-German feelings following World War I. Most continental European countries still maintain the term to designate departments, colleges, position titles, and journals. J. R. R. Tolkien opposed the nationalist reaction against philological practices, claiming that "the philological instinct" was "universal as is the use of language". In British English usage, and British academia, philology remains largely synonymous with "historical linguistics", while in U.S. English, and U.S. academia, the wider meaning of "study of a language's grammar, history and literary tradition" remains more widespread. Based on the harsh critique of Friedrich Nietzsche, some U.S. scholars since the 1980s have viewed philology as responsible for a narrowly scientistic study of language and literature.

Disagreements in the modern day of this branch of study are followed with the likes of how the method is treated among other scholars, as noted by both the philologists R.D Fulk and Leonard Neidorf who have been quoted saying "This field "philology's commitment to falsification renders” it at odds with what many literary scholars believe because the purpose of philology is to narrow the range of possible interpretations rather than to treat all reasonable ones as equal". This use of falsification can be seen in the debate surrounding the etymology of the Old English character Unferth from the heroic epic poem Beowulf.

James Turner further disagrees with how the use of the term is dismissed in the academic world, stating that due to its branding as a "simpleminded approach to their subject" the term has become unknown to college-educated students, furthering the stereotypes of "scrutiny of ancient Greek or Roman texts of a nit-picking classicist" and only the "technical research into languages and families".

== In popular culture ==
In The Space Trilogy by C. S. Lewis, the main character, Elwin Ransom, is a philologist – as was Lewis' close friend J. R. R. Tolkien.

Dr. Edward Morbius, one of the main characters in the science fiction film Forbidden Planet, is a philologist.

Philip, the main character of Christopher Hampton's 'bourgeois comedy' The Philanthropist, is a professor of philology in an English university town.

Moritz-Maria von Igelfeld, the main character in Alexander McCall Smith's 1997 comic novel Portuguese Irregular Verbs is a philologist, educated at Cambridge.

The main character in the Academy Award Nominee for Best Foreign Language Film in 2012, Footnote, is a Hebrew philologist, and a significant part of the film deals with his work.

In the science fiction TV show Stargate SG-1, Dr. Daniel Jackson, is mentioned as having a PhD in philology.

== See also ==
- American Journal of Philology
- Codicology – Study of codices or manuscript books
- Elocution – Study of formal speaking in pronunciation, grammar, style, and tone
- Etymology – Study of the origin and evolution of words
- Lexicography – Art and science of compiling dictionaries
- Lexicology – Linguistic discipline studying words
- Palaeography – Study of handwriting and manuscripts
- Stylistics – Branch of applied linguistics
- Textual scholarship – Academic analysis of texts
- Western canon – Cultural classics valued in the West
- Kaozheng – Philology in China
- Kokugaku – Philology in Japan
- Language: An Introduction to the Study of Speech – Book by Edward Sapir
- Edward Sapir – American linguist and anthropologist (1884–1939)
- Historical linguistics – Study of language change over time
- Comparative linguistics – Branch of linguistics
- Ancient language – Language originated in times that may be referred to as ancient
- Standard language – Language variety with substantially codified usage
- Official language – Language given special status in a country or territory
- Literary language – Form of a language used in written literature
- Sacred language – Language that is cultivated for religious reasons
- World language – Language that is spoken internationally and often learned as a second language
- Lingua franca – Concept in linguistics
- World language – Language that is spoken internationally and often learned as a second language
- Linguistic purism – Preferring a language variety as purer
- Linguistic prescription – Prescriptive rules of grammar and usage
- Linguistic description – Work of objectively describing language use
- Linguistics – Scientific study of language
- J.R.R. Tolkien – English writer and philologist (1892–1973)
- Tolkien's legendarium – J. R. R. Tolkien's mythological writings
- Philology and Middle-earth – Influence on J.R.R. Tolkien's fantasy
