= Incorporation (linguistics) =

When a grammatical category forms a compound while retaining original syntactic function

In linguistics, incorporation is a phenomenon by which a grammatical category, such as a verb, forms a compound with its direct object (object incorporation) or adverbial modifier, while retaining its original syntactic function. The inclusion of a noun qualifies the verb, narrowing its scope rather than making reference to a specific entity. Incorporation is central to many polysynthetic languages such as those found in North America, Siberia and northern Australia. However, polysynthesis does not necessarily imply incorporation, and the presence of incorporation does not imply that the language is polysynthetic.

== Examples of incorporation ==
=== English ===
Although incorporation does not occur regularly, English uses it sometimes: breastfeed, and direct object incorporation, as in babysit. Etymologically, such verbs in English are usually back-formations: the verbs breastfeed and babysit are formed from the adjective breast-fed and the noun babysitter respectively. Incorporation and plain compounding may be fuzzy categories: consider backstabbing, name-calling, axe murder.

=== Oneida ===
The following example from Oneida (Iroquoian) illustrates noun incorporation.

waʼ- k- hninu- ': ne ka- nakt- aʼ
FACT- 1.SG- buy- PUNC ne PREF- bed- SUF
'I bought the bed.'

In this example, the verbal root hninu appears with its usual verbal morphology: a factive marker (FACT), which very roughly translates as past tense, although this is not quite accurate; an agreement marker (1.SG), which tells us that the verb agrees with 1st person singular (the speaker); and an aspect marker, punctual (PUNC), which tells us that this is a completed event. The direct object ne kanaktaʼ follows the verb. The function of the particle ne is to determine the bed: in the example, I bought this specific bed. The word for bed consists of a root nakt plus a prefix and a suffix. The notion of the root is important here, but the properties of the prefix and suffix do not matter for this discussion.

In the following sentence, the bed is unspecified. Unspecified nouns can be incorporated, thus creating a general statement. In this example: I bought a bed (and not a specific bed). In a broader sense, depending on context, it can even mean that I am a bed buyer, as in: I am a trader of beds, buying beds is my profession.

waʼ- ke- nakt- a- hninu- ':
FACT- 1.SG- bed- EPEN- buy- PUNC
'I bought a bed.'

In this example, the root for bed nakt has incorporated into the verbal construction and appears before the verbal root. Two other incidental changes are noticed here. First, the agreement marker in the first example is k and in the second example is ke. These are two phonologically-conditioned allomorphs. In other words, the choice between using k and ke is based on the other sounds in the word (and has nothing to do with noun incorporation). Also, there is an epenthetic vowel a between the nominal and verbal roots. This vowel is inserted to break up an illegal consonant cluster (and also has nothing to do with noun incorporation).

=== Panare ===
The next example, from Panare, illustrates the cross-linguistically common phenomenon that the incorporated form of a noun may be significantly different from its unincorporated form. The first sentence contains the incorporated form u' of "head", and the second its unincorporated form ipu:

y-u'-kïti-ñe amën
3-head-cut-IMPERF.TR 2SG
"You head-cut it."

y-ipu-n yï-kïti-ñe amën
3-head-POSS TR-cut-IMPERF.TR 2SG
"You cut its head."

=== Chukchi ===
Chukchi, a Chukotko-Kamchatkan language spoken in North Eastern Siberia, provides a wealth of examples of noun incorporation. The phrase təpelarkən qoraŋə means "I'm leaving the reindeer" and has two words (the verb in the first person singular, and the noun). The same idea can be expressed with the single word təqorapelarkən, in which the noun root qora- "reindeer" is incorporated into the verb word.

=== Mohawk ===
Mohawk, an Iroquoian language, makes heavy use of incorporation, as in: watia'tawi'tsherí:io "it is a good shirt", where the noun root atia'tawi "upper body garment" is present inside the verb.

=== Cheyenne ===
Cheyenne, an Algonquian language of the Great Plains, also uses noun incorporation on a regular basis. Consider nátahpe'emaheona, meaning "I have a big house", which contains the noun morpheme maheo "house".

=== Chinese (Mandarin) ===
Chinese makes extensive use of verb-object compounds, which are compounds composed of two constituents having the syntactic relation of verb and its direct object. For example, the verb shuì-jiào 睡覺 'sleep (VO)' is composed of the verb shuì 睡 'sleep (V)' and the bound morpheme object jiào 覺 'sleep (N)'. Aspect markers (e.g. 了 le PERFECTIVE), classifier phrases (e.g. 三個鐘頭 sān ge zhōngtóu THREE + CL + hours), and other elements may separate the two constituents of these compounds, though different verb-object compounds vary in degree of separability.

=== Turkish ===
The verb etmek in Turkish always has an incorporated noun object: it cannot occur without one. For example, the noun yardım means "help"; the verbal complex yardım etmek means "to help", with the person being helping occurring in the dative case, e.g. bana yardım etti "s/he helped me", with the first person singular pronoun ben "I" in the dative case bana "to me". The verb kaybetmek evolved from kayıp etmek (both mean "to lose"); kayıp means "loss"; kayıp olmak "to be lost" evolved into kaybolmak.

== Noun incorporation ==
Sapir (1911) and Mithun (1984) define noun incorporation (NI) as "a construction in which a noun and a verb stem combine to yield a complex verb". Due to the wide variation in how noun incorporation presents itself in different languages, however, it is difficult to create an agreed upon and all-encompassing definition. As a result, most syntacticians have focused on generating definitions that apply to the languages they have studied, regardless of whether or not they are cross-linguistically attested.

In many cases, a phrase with an incorporated noun carries a different meaning with respect to the equivalent phrase where the noun is not incorporated into the verb. The difference seems to hang around the generality and definiteness of the statement. The incorporated phrase is usually generic and indefinite, while the non-incorporated one is more specific.

In Yucatec Maya, for example, the phrase "I chopped a tree", when the word for "tree" is incorporated, changes its meaning to "I chopped wood". In Lahu (a Tibeto-Burman language), the definite phrase "I drink the liquor" becomes the more general "I drink liquor" when "liquor" is incorporated. The Japanese phrase 目を覚ます me o samasu means "to wake up" or literally to wake (one's) eyes. But when the direct object is incorporated into the nominal form of the verb, the resulting noun 目覚まし mezamashi literally means "waking up", as in 目覚まし時計 mezamashidokei meaning "alarm clock."

This tendency is not a rule. There are languages where noun incorporation does not produce a meaning change (though it may cause a change in syntax—as explained below).

Noun incorporation can interact with the transitivity of the verb it applies to in two different ways. In some languages, the incorporated noun deletes one of the arguments of the verb, and this is shown explicitly: if the verb is transitive, the derived verb word with an incorporated noun (which functions as the direct object) becomes formally intransitive and is marked as such. In other languages this change does not take place, or at least it is not shown by explicit morphology. A recent study found out that across languages, morphosyntactically highly transitive verbs and patientive intransitive verbs are most likely to perform noun incorporation.

Incorporation looks at whether verb arguments, its nominal complements, exist on the same syntactic level or not. Incorporation is characterized as a stem combination meaning it combines independent lexical items into a modal or auxiliary verb to ultimately form a complex verb. The stem of the verb will be the determiner of the new category in which the incorporation belongs and the noun which was incorporated drops its own categorical features and grammatical markings, if employed. This is done by the movement of the incorporated noun to its new position in syntax. When participating in noun incorporation, it allows for the speaker to represent an alternative expression to further explain and shift focus to the information being presented (Mithun 1984).

Although incorporation exists in many languages, incorporation is optional and non-obligatory. Incorporation is restricted to certain noun categories; namely on the degree to which they are animate or alive or suppletive forms.

If a language participates in productive compounding it does not allow for incorporation. An example of a compounding language is German. Respectively, if a language participates in incorporation it does not allow for productive compounding.

The most common type of NI is where the incorporated noun acts as the notional subject of the clause. This can be observed in Onondaga, Southern Tiwa and Koryak.

=== Types ===
In 1985, Mithun introduced a four-type system to define the functionality and progression of noun incorporation in a language. This system is important as many discuss this, and it is widely applied to explain the differences in NI in languages. The four types are:

1. Lexical compounding: involves a verb incorporating a nominal argument. The resulting compound usually describes a noteworthy or recurring activity. The noun in these compounds are not commonly marked for definiteness or number.
2. Manipulation of case roles: The second type uses the same process to manipulate case roles, incorporating the argument into the verb to allow for a new argument to take its place.
3. Manipulation of discourse structure: The third type uses noun incorporation to background old or established information. A speaker might explicitly mention an entity once, for example, and thereafter refer to it using an incorporated verbal compound. This kind of noun incorporation is usually seen in polysynthetic languages.
4. Classificatory incorporation: The fourth and final type proposed by Mithun involves the development of a set of classificatory compounds, in which verbs are paired with generic nouns to describe properties of an entity, rather than the entity itself.

According to Mithun, languages exhibiting any of these types always display all of the lower types as well (that is, a language exhibiting type 3 would also display type 1 and 2, for example). This seems to imply a pattern of progression, as Mithun describes in her 1984 paper on the evolution of noun incorporation. It is argued that it is necessary to distinguish at least two types of noun incorporation.

=== Accounts ===
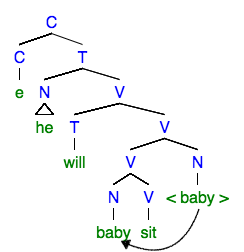
Figure 1: English syntax tree example illustrating noun incorporation following Baker's (1989) head movement hypothesis.

A large field of inquiry addresses whether NI is a syntactic process (verb and noun originate in different nodes and come together through syntactic means), a lexical process (word-formation rules that apply in the lexicon dictate NI), or a combined process (entailing the investigation of which aspects of noun incorporation can be productively created through general syntactic rules and which must be specified in the lexicon). This will vary from one case to another, as some languages, primarily those labelled as polysynthetic, allow for incorporated structures in a wide variety of sentences, whereas in others (such as English) this incorporation is more limited. Theories of morphology-syntax interaction and the debate between syntactic and lexical accounts of NI strive to be restrictive enough to account for the stable properties of NI in a unified way, but also account for language-specific variations. While this section discusses the influential syntactic and combined approaches to NI, highly-influential lexical accounts, such as Rosen's (1989) paper, do exist.

One highly-influential syntactic account for NI is the head-movement process proposed by Baker (1988). This account states that this NI head movement is distinct from but similar to the better-established phenomenon of phrase movement and involves the movement of a head noun out of object position and into a position where it adjoins to a governing verb. An example of this movement can be seen in figure 1 where the head noun 'baby' is moved out of the object N position to become incorporated with the verb as the sister to the verb 'sit'. While this theory does not account for every language, it does provide a starting point for subsequent syntactic analyses of NI, both with and without head movement. A more recent paper by Baker (2007) addresses a number of other influential accounts including Massam’s pseudo-incorporation, Van Geenhoven’s base generation, and Koopman and Szabolcsi’s small-phrase movement. The paper concluded that, while each account has their own strong points, they all fail to answer some important questions, thus requiring the continued use of Baker's head-movement account.

Others, including Barrrie and Mattieu (2016), have argued against Baker’s head-movement hypothesis. They have investigated Onondaga and Ojibwe and proposed that phrasal movement rather than head movement can account for NI in a number of languages (including Mohawk).

=== Examples from different languages ===
==== Polysynthetic languages ====
A polysynthetic language is one in which multiple morphemes, including affixes, are often present within a single word. Each word can therefore express the meaning of a full clause or phrase; this structure has implications on how noun incorporation is manifested in the languages in which it is observed.

===== Lakhota =====
In Lakhota, a Siouan language of the plains, for example, the phrase "the man is chopping wood" can be expressed either as a transitive wičháša kiŋ čháŋ kiŋ kaksáhe ("man the wood the chopping") or as an intransitive wičháša kiŋ čhaŋkáksahe ("man the wood-chopping") in which the independent nominal čháŋ, "wood", becomes a root incorporated into the verb: "wood-chopping".

===== Mohawk =====
Mohawk is an Iroquoian language in which noun incorporation occurs. NI is a very salient property of Northern Iroquoian languages, including Mohawk, and is seen unusually often in comparison to other languages. Noun incorporation in Mohawk involves the compounding of a noun stem with a verb stem to form a new verb stem.

The structure of nouns in Mohawk:
gender prefix	noun stem	noun suffix

Only the noun stem is incorporated into the verb in NI, not the whole noun word.

The structure of verbs in Mohawk:
pre-pronominal prefix	pronominal prefix	reflexive and reciprocal particle	incorporated noun root	verb root	suffixes

Mohawk grammar allows for whole propositions to be expressed by one word, which is classified as a verb. Other core elements, namely nouns (subjects, objects, etc.), can be incorporated into the verb. Well-formed verb phrases contain at the bare minimum a verb root and a pronominal prefix. The rest of the elements (and therefore noun incorporation) are optional. In the examples below, one can see the original sentence in 1a and the same sentence with noun incorporation into the verb in 1b, where instead of "bought a bed", the literal translation of the sentence is "bed-bought".

Wa'-k-hnínu-' ne ka-nákt-a'
FACT-1sS-buy-PUNC NE Ns-bed-NSF
'I bought the/a bed'

Wa'-ke-nákt-a-hnínu-'
FACT-1sS-bed-∅-buy-PUNC
'I bought the/a bed'

It is true in Mohawk, as it is in many languages, that the direct object of a transitive verb can incorporate, but the subject of a transitive verb cannot. This can be seen in the examples below, as the well-formed sentence in 2a involves the incorporation of na'tar (bread), the direct object of the transitive verb kwetar (cut). Example 2b represents a sentence that is ill-formed, as it cannot possess the same meaning as 2a ('this knife cuts bread'). This is because the subject of the transitive verb, a'shar (knife), is being incorporated into the verb, which is not attested in Mohawk.

Kikv a'shar-e' ka-na'tar-a-kwetar-vs
this knife-NSF NsS-bread-∅-cut-HAB
'This knife cuts bread'

#Kikv w-a'shar-a-kwetar-vs ne ka-na'tar-o
this NsS-knife-∅-cut-HAB NE Ns-bread-NSF
'The bread cuts this knife'

Further, a unique feature of Mohawk is that this language allows for noun incorporation into intransitives, as illustrated in example sentence 3. Hri' (shatter) is an intransitive verb into which the noun stem ks (dish) is being incorporated, producing a well-formed sentence.

Wa'-t-ka-ks-a-hri'-ne'
FACT-DUP-NsS-dish-∅-shatter-PUNC
'The dish broke'

Another feature of Mohawk which is not as commonly attested cross-linguistically is that Mohawk allows a demonstrative, numeral, or adjective outside the complex verb to be interpreted as a modifier of the incorporated noun. Example sentence 4 illustrates this below. Here, the demonstrative thinkv (that) refers to, and therefore modifies, the incorporated noun ather (basket).

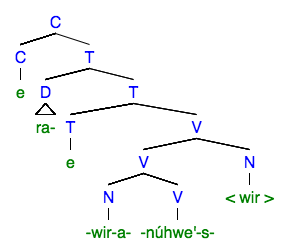
Figure 2: Simplified syntax tree of noun incorporation in Mohawk following Baker's head-movement hypothesis

Wa'-k-ather-a-hninu-' thinkv
FACT-1sS-basket-∅-buy-PUNC that
'I bought that basket'

According to Mithun's (1984) theory of noun-incorporation classification, Mohawk is generally considered a type IV language because the incorporated noun modifies the internal argument. As a result of this classification, NI in Mohawk can follow any of the four structures listed in Mithun's paper, including lexical compounding, manipulation of case roles, manipulation of discourse structure, and classificatory incorporation.

Baker, Aranovich, & Golluscio claim that the structure of NI in Mohawk is the result of noun movement in the syntax. This is an extension of Baker's head-movement hypothesis which is described above. The differences displayed by Mohawk as compared to other languages therefore depend on whether or not the person, number, and gender features are retained in the ‘trace’ of the noun, the trace being the position from where the noun moved from object position before adjoining to the governing verb. Figure 2 illustrates a simplified syntax tree of noun incorporation in Mohawk following Baker's head-movement hypothesis. Here, the noun -wir- (baby) is moved from the object N position to become incorporated with the verb as the sister to the verb -núhwe'- (to like). Please note that some details were not included in this tree for illustrative purposes.

===== Oneida =====
In Oneida (an Iroquoian language spoken in Southern Ontario and Wisconsin), one finds classifier noun incorporation, in which a generic noun acting as a direct object can be incorporated into a verb, but a more specific direct object is left in place. In a rough translation, one would say, for example, "I animal-bought this pig", where "animal" is the generic incorporated noun. Note that this "classifier" is not an actual classifier (i.e., a class-agreement morpheme) but a common noun.

===== Cherokee =====
Cherokee is spoken by the Cherokee people and is a member of the Iroquoian family. Noun incorporation in the language is very limited and the cases are lexicalized. All of the noun incorporation in Cherokee involves a body-part word and few nouns; to make up for the lack of NI, it has a system of classificatory verbs with five distinct categories.

NI involving a body part word
Cherokee	Structure	English translation
jasgwo:hli:ʔi dagv:yv́ :nì:li	2sg.PAT-abdomen CISL-1sg>2sg-hit:PFT-MOT	'I'm going to hit you in the stomach'

NI classificatory verbs
Cherokee	Structure	English translation
kalsě:ji à:giha	candy 1sg.pat-have.cmp-ind	'I have candy'

===== Sora =====
The Austroasiatic language of Sora spoken in India and Nepal is mildly polysynthetic. Sora allows multiple incorporated nouns in a single verb and incorporated nouns in serialized verb structure. One negative-TAM or plural subject prefix can be added before verbs.

anlɛn a-ɲam-dʒaʔt-li-n-aj
we 1PL-catch-snake-PST-INTR/MDL-1PL.ACT
'We caught snake(s).'

dʒo-me-bo:b-dem-te-n-ai
smear-oil-head-REFL-NPST-INTR-1.CLOC
'I will anoint my head with oil.'

===== Tangut =====
The extinct Sino-Tibetan language of Tangut (spoken in the Western Xia) has few attested cases of syntactic noun incorporation:

gji² jij¹ kjɨ¹-dzju²-phjo²-nja²
son GEN AOR.IN-lord-cause-2SG.SUBJ
'You made your son lord (of Zhongshan)'

==== Non-polysynthetic languages ====
===== English =====
English noun incorporation differs from that of the polysynthetic languages described above.

Noun incorporation was not traditionally common in English, but has over time become more productive.

Productive noun incorporation
a. I went elk-hunting the other day.
b. Peter really enjoys teacup-decorating.
c. Alice wants to try ladder-making to keep her wood-working skills sharp.

Productive incorporation involves a singular noun with no determiner, quantifier, or adjunct.

Possible vs. impossible noun incorporation
a. Will enjoys watch-collecting
b. *Will enjoys watches-collecting.
c. *Will enjoys some watches-collecting.
d. *Will enjoys a watch-collecting.

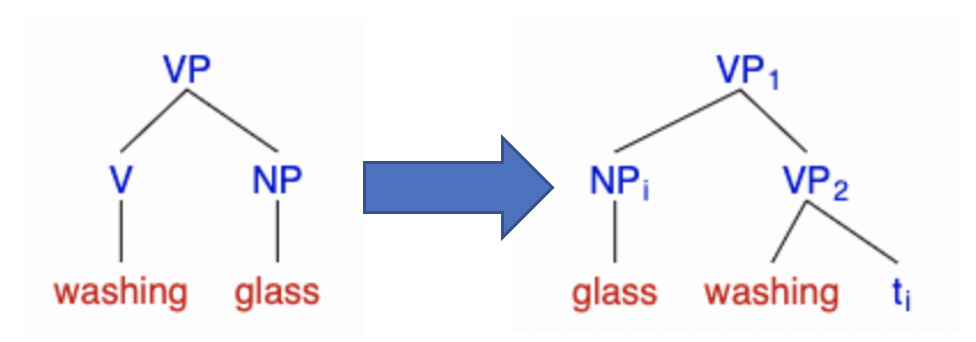
Figure 3: English syntax tree illustrating productive noun incorporation as shown in Barrie (2011).

Noun incorporation forms a new verb through lexical compounding. The noun adds a recognizable concept that alters the semantics of a verb. This is known as an incorporation complex, decreasing or increasing the valency of the verb.

In English, it is more common for an argument or an actant to be incorporated into the predicate, which results in additional connotation or metaphoric meaning, e.g., to house-hunt. Although often making the semantics more complex, it simplifies the syntax of the sentence by incorporating the actant-sender house.

English uses only lexical compounding, not composition by juxtaposition or morphological compounding. Lexical compounding occurs for an entity, quality, or activity that deserves its own name, e.g., mountain-climbing. If mountain-climbing were not an institutional activity, the language would be less likely to recognize it. To be incorporated into a host verb, the syntactic features of the noun are dropped.

English also uses conversion, forming denominal verbs. The incorporated actant does not possess a separate syntactic position in the verb.

English denominal verbs
Denominal verbs (Theme)	Denominal verbs (Goal)
to butter	to bottle
to powder	to package
to water	to pocket

The following illustrates the three sources of incorporation in English with corresponding examples:

English incorporation
Back-formations (action doers -er)	Back-formations (action indicator)	Verbal function of compound nouns
kidnapper	muck-raking	finger-paint
eavesdropper	mass-production	dog-train
teacher		song-write

In the examples above, the incorporated actant possesses a separate syntactic position in the verb.

===== Hungarian =====
Hungarian is a Uralic language in which many different types of noun incorporation occur. The linguistic typology of Hungarian is agglutinative, meaning that the language has words that may consist of a whole series of distinct morphemes. Hungarian combines "bare noun + verb" to form a new complex verb, and this would correspond to Mithun's first type of NI, lexical compounding. Phonologically, the V and N are separate words, but syntactically, the N loses its syntactic status as the argument of the sentence, and the VN unit becomes an intransitive predicate. This is demonstrated in the examples below:

Examples of bare noun + verb NI
Hungarian	English translation
házat épít	'house-building'
levelet ír	'letter-writing'
újságot olvas	'newspaper-reading'

To be clear, to 'house-build' is not the same as to 'build a house': 'house-building' is a complex activity and a unitary concept, and this is applied to other examples as well. The object argument of the underlying verb may be satisfied by the bare noun, but the bare noun does not act as an argument of a sentence like it usually would. In Hungarian, for examples such as the one mentioned, the incorporating verb must be imperfective and the complex verb formed from it must always be intransitive.

In Hungarian, incorporated nominals may be morphologically singular or plural; this is dependent on whether languages allow this or not in their incorporation.

Example of singular/plural NI
Hungarian	English translation
feleséget keres	'wife-seeks'
feleségeket keres	'wives-seeks'

One restriction in Hungarian is that bare object nouns cannot be incorporated with prefixed verbs.

Example of prefixed verb NI attempt
*Hungarian	Structure
*levelet megír	letter-acc pref-write
*újságot elolvas	newspaper-acc pref-read

Another restriction in the language is that stative verbs do not allow noun incorporation, even if the stative verbs are not prefixed verbs.

Example of stative verb NI attempt
*Hungarian	Structure	English translation
*filmet lát	film-acc see	'film-see'
*lányt szeret	girl-acc love	'girl-love'

However, there are some unprefixed verbs that are perfective and allow NI in Hungarian.

===== Korean =====
Korean, part of the Koreanic language family, has noun incorporation.

Specifically, Korean obeys the Head Movement Constraint of Baker (1988) that was discussed in the prior section.

Korean possesses incorporated nouns in the structure [N + VStem + AN1(i)], which is different from the normal N + V as in English. AN is an affix in this case.

Example of NI in Korean
Korean	Structure	Translation
hæ-tot-i	sun-rise-AN	'sunrise'
haru-sal-i	day-live-AN	'dayfly'
kamok-sal-i	prison-live-AN	'living-in-prison'

In Korean, the noun, the head of the preceding NP, moves to the head of the VP to form a syntactic compound. The complex VP then moves up to the right of the nominal head position where '-i' is base-generated.
