= Classical language =

Old language with established literature or use

A classical language is any language with an independent literary tradition and a large body of ancient written literature. Typically associated with civilizations of antiquity, these languages serve as foundational sources for historical, philosophical, religious, and scientific texts, often enduring long after their everyday spoken use has declined.

Many classical languages are considered extinct or no longer in vernacular use, while some exist in liturgical or literary contexts. Those that are still in use today tend to show diglossic characteristics in areas where they are used, as the difference between spoken and written languages has widened over time.

The term "classical language" may refer more narrowly to only Ancient Greek and Latin, especially in the context of classical studies.

== Classical studies in Europe ==
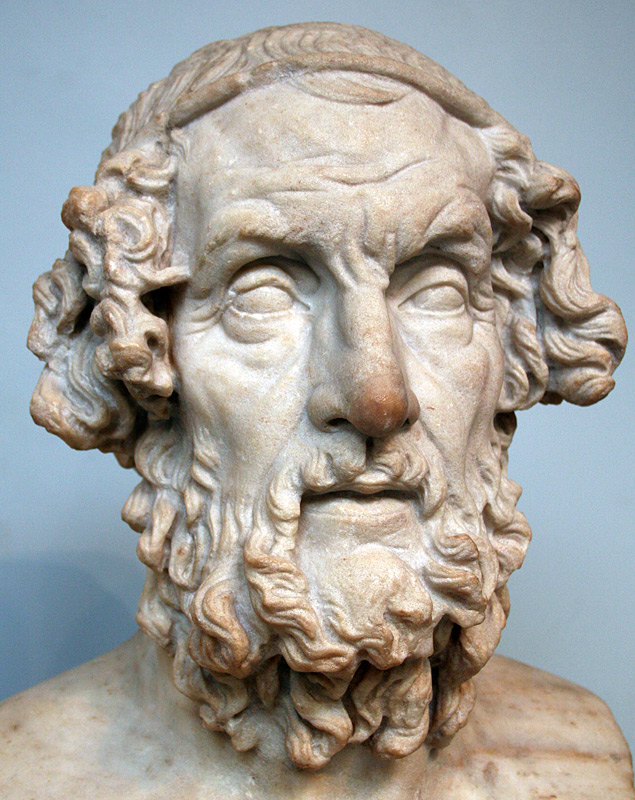
Bust of Homer in the British Museum, London

In the context of traditional European classical studies, the "classical languages" refer to Greek and Latin, which were the literary languages of the Mediterranean world in classical antiquity.

Greek was the language of Homer and of classical Athenian, Hellenistic and Byzantine historians, playwrights, and philosophers. It has contributed many words to the vocabulary of English and many other European languages and has been a standard subject of study in Western educational institutions since the Renaissance. Latinized forms of Ancient Greek roots are used in many of the scientific names of species and in other scientific terminology. Koine Greek, which served as a lingua franca in the Eastern Roman Empire, remains in use today as a sacred language in some Eastern Orthodox churches. Koine Greek eventually gave rise to Medieval Greek and then Modern Greek.

Latin became the lingua franca of the early Roman Empire and later of the Western Roman Empire. Despite the decline of the Western Roman Empire, the Latin language continued to flourish in the very different social and economic environment of the Middle Ages, not least because it became the official language of the Roman Catholic Church.

In Western and Central Europe and in parts of northern Africa, Latin retained its elevated status as the main vehicle of communication for the learned classes throughout the Middle Ages and, subsequently, in the Early modern period. In the 21st century, Latin is still taught in the United States, mostly in elite private schools.

Until the end of the 17th century, the majority of books and almost all diplomatic documents were written in Latin. Some of the last major international treaties to be written in Latin include the Treaty of Vienna in 1738 and the Treaty of Belgrade in 1739; after the War of the Austrian Succession (1740–48), international diplomacy was conducted predominantly in French. French (itself a Romance language, a language that evolved from Latin) replaced Latin as the prestige language of politics, trade, education, diplomacy, military and international relations. It retained this role until approximately the middle of the 20th century, when it was replaced by English (a Germanic language). Like French, Spanish also evolved from Latin. Around 75% of modern Spanish vocabulary is Latin in origin, including Latin borrowings from Ancient Greek. At present, it is the second most used language in international trade, and the third most used in politics, diplomacy and culture after English and French.

Latin was not supplanted for scientific purposes until the 18th century and, for formal descriptions in zoology and botany, survived until the late 20th century. The modern international binomial nomenclature holds to this day, where taxonomists assign a Latin or Latinized name as the scientific name of each species.

Vulgar Latin, the range of non-formal registers of Latin spoken from the Late Roman Republic onward, is the ancestor of the Romance languages (Spanish, Portuguese, French, Italian, Romanian, Catalan, etc.). The Romance languages spread throughout the world owing to the period of European colonialism beginning in the 15th century. There are more than 900 million native speakers of Neo-Latin languages found worldwide, mainly in the Americas, Europe, and parts of Africa. French, Spanish, and Portuguese also have many non-native speakers; they are widely used as lingua francas.

== Classical languages in Asia ==
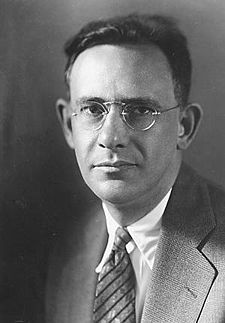
Edward Sapir (1884-1939), linguist, around 1910

In terms of worldwide cultural importance, Edward Sapir in his 1921 book Language extends the list to include classical Chinese, Sanskrit and Arabic:

When we realize that an educated Japanese can hardly frame a single literary sentence without the use of Chinese resources, that to this day Siamese and Burmese and Cambodgian bear the unmistakable imprint of the Sanskrit and Pali that came in with Hindu Buddhism centuries ago, or that whether we argue for or against the teaching of Latin and Greek [in schools,] our argument is sure to be studded with words that have come to us from Rome and Athens, we get some indication of what early Chinese culture and Buddhism, and classical Mediterranean civilization have meant in the world's history. There are just five languages that have had an overwhelming significance as carriers of culture. They are classical Chinese, Sanskrit, Arabic, Greek, and Latin. In comparison with these, even such culturally important languages as Hebrew and French sink into a secondary position.

In this sense, a classical language is a language that has a broad influence over an extended period of time, even after it is no longer a colloquial mother tongue in its original form. If one language uses roots from another language to coin words (in the way that many European languages use Greek and Latin roots to devise new words such as "telephone", etc.), this is an indication that the second language is a classical language.

In comparison, living languages with a large sphere of influence are known as world languages.

The use of Classical Chinese in writing remained nearly universal until the late 19th century, culminating with the widespread adoption of written vernacular Chinese with the May Fourth Movement beginning in 1919. Spoken Chinese evolved faster than the written form. The vernacular Old Chinese eventually gave rise to Middle Chinese in the Middle Ages. Middle Chinese gave rise to local Chinese language varieties forming a branch of the Sino-Tibetan language family, many of which are not mutually intelligible. The varieties are typically classified into several groups: Mandarin, Wu, Min, Xiang, Gan, Jin, Hakka and Yue, though some varieties remain unclassified. Modern Standard Chinese is based on Mandarin and is the national lingua franca of China, one of the official languages of the United Nations and of Singapore, and one of the national languages of Taiwan.

Outside the learned sphere of written Classical Sanskrit, vernacular colloquial dialects (Prakrits) continued to evolve. Sanskrit co-existed with numerous other Prakrit languages of ancient India. The oldest attested Prakrits are the Buddhist and Jain canonical languages Pali and Ardhamagadhi Prakrit, respectively. By medieval times, the Prakrits had diversified into various Middle Indo-Aryan languages. Apabhraṃśa is the conventional cover term for transitional dialects connecting late Middle Indo-Aryan with early modern Indo-Aryan, spanning roughly the 6th to 13th centuries. The largest languages that formed from Apabhraṃśa were Bengali, Bhojpuri, Hindustani, Assamese, Sindhi, Gujarati, Odia, Marathi, and Punjabi. Hindustani, spoken in North India and Pakistan, is the lingua franca of the region and has two standard registers, known as Hindi (Prakritised and Sanskritised register written in the Brahmic script) and Urdu (Persianised and Arabised register written in the Perso-Arabic script), which serve as official languages of the governments of India and Pakistan, respectively.

Classical Arabic is the register of the Arabic language on which Modern Standard Arabic is based. Modern Standard Arabic is its direct descendant used today throughout the Arab world in writing and in formal speaking, for example prepared speeches, some radio and television broadcasts and non-entertainment content. In the Arab world little distinction is made between Classical Arabic and Modern Standard Arabic and both are normally called al-fuṣḥā (الفصحى) in Arabic, meaning 'the most eloquent'. Geographically, modern Arabic varieties are classified into five groups: Maghrebi (including the Moroccan, Algerian, Tunisian, Libyan, Hassaniya and Saharan dialects), Egyptian (including Egyptian and Sudanese), Mesopotamian, Levantine and Peninsular Arabic (including Gulf, Emirati, Kuwaiti, Hejazi, Najdi, Yemeni, Omani, etc) Speakers from distant areas, across national borders, within countries and even between cities and villages, can struggle to understand each other's dialects..

== General usage ==
The following languages are generally taken to have a "classical" stage. Such stages exist within a limited time frame and are only considered "classical" if the language comes to be regarded within a literary "golden age" retrospectively. Thus, Classical Greek is the language of 5th to 4th century BC Athens and only a small subset of the varieties of the Greek language as a whole. A "classical" period usually corresponds to a flowering of literature following an "archaic" period, such as Classical Latin succeeding Old Latin, Classical Sumerian succeeding Archaic Sumerian, Tamil for its continuous literature, Classical Sanskrit succeeding Vedic Sanskrit, and Classical Persian succeeding Old Persian. However, this is not required for a language to be considered classical. For example, Old Chinese is taken to include, rather than precede, Classical Chinese. In some cases, such as those of Persian, the "classical" stage corresponds to the earliest attested literary variant.

=== Antiquity ===
- Classical Sumerian (literary language of Sumer, c. 26th to 23rd centuries BC) Sumerograms were used in Cuneiform even for non-Sumerian texts until the writing system went out of use around the first century AD
- Middle Egyptian (literary language of Ancient Egypt from c. the 20th century BC to the 4th century AD)
- Old Babylonian (the Akkadian language from c. 20th to 16th centuries BC, the imitated standard for later literary works)
- Middle Assyrian (the Akkadian language from c. 16th to 13th centuries BC)
- Vedic Sanskrit (the form of Sanskrit before Classical standardization was used in Vedic texts from c. 15th to 5th centuries BC)
- Old Avestan (language of the Avesta, 15th to 5th centuries BC)
- Classical Hebrew (language of the Tanakh, in particular of the prophetic books of c. the 7th and 6th centuries BC)
- Imperial Aramaic (standardized language of Old Aramaic, 7th to 3rd centuries BC)
- Old Persian (court language of the Achaemenid Empire, 6th to 4th centuries BC)
- Classical Greek (Attic dialect of the 5th century BC; Koine dialect of the Hellenistic period and Roman era, 323 BC to 330 AD)
- Classical Chinese (based on the literary language, Yayan, used in the capital Luoyang of the Eastern Zhou Dynasty from c. the 5th century BC)
- Classical Sanskrit (described by Pāṇini's Ashtadhyayi of the 4th century BC)
- Classical Tamil (Sangam literature c. 3rd century BC to 3rd century AD, defined by Tolkāppiyam)
- Pali (Pali Canon used this language from 2nd centuries BC)
- Maharashtri Prakrit (a Prakrit language, was the official language of the Satavahana dynasty c. 2nd century BC)
- Classical Latin (literary language of the 1st century BC)
- Classical Mandaic (literary Aramaic of Mandaeism, 1st century AD)
- Classical Syriac (literary Aramaic of Syriac Christianity, 3rd to 5th centuries)
- Middle Persian (court language of the Sassanid Empire, 3rd to 7th centuries)
- Coptic (language of Egypt and the Coptic Orthodox Church of Alexandria, 3rd to 13th centuries, liturgical language to the present day)

=== Middle Ages ===
- Buddhist Chinese (language of the Chinese Buddhist Canon, literary lingua franca of East Asian Buddhism)
- Classical Armenian (the oldest attested form of Armenian from the 5th century, literary language until the 18th century, and language of the Armenian Apostolic Church)
- Geʽez (language of the Ethiopian Orthodox Tewahedo Church; the Garima Gospels are dated from the 5th century to the 10th century by various scholars)
- Old Georgian (language of Georgia, 5th to 11th centuries)
- Sogdian (lingua franca of Central Asia, 6th to 8th centuries)
- Classical Arabic (language of the Qur'an, 7th century to present; liturgical language of Islam)
- Classical Odia (the earliest form of Odia language, attested in Ganga dynasty, 7th to 12th centuries)
- Classical Marathi (the earliest form of Marathi language, attested in Yadava dynasty, 7th to 12th centuries)
- Classical Assamese (the earliest form of Assamese language, attested in Kamarupa kingdom, 7th to 12th centuries)
- Classical Bengali (the earliest form of Bengali language, attested in Kingdom of Gauda, 7th to 12th centuries)
- Old Khmer (language of the Khmer Empire, 9th to 15th centuries)
- Classical Kannada (court language of Rashtrakuta empire; earliest available literary work is the Kavirājamārga of AD 850)
- Old Saxon (language of Saxon Christian literature, 9th to 12th centuries)
- Old English (language of Beowulf and the Anglo-Saxon Chronicle with many divergent written dialects, but partially standardized in West Saxon form)
- Old French (language of chivalric romance, 8th to 14th centuries)
- Old East Slavic (language of the Kievan Rus', 9th to 13th centuries)
- Classical Persian (language of classical Persian literature, 9th to present)
- Old Uyghur (Turkic language spoken in Qocho from 9th to 14th centuries and in Gansu)
- Old Nubian (language of Nubia, 9th or 10th to 15th centuries)
- Old Javanese (language of Old Javanese literature, used primarily during Hindu-Buddhist Javanese kingdom era from 10th to 15th centuries)
- Old Church Slavonic (language of the First Bulgarian Empire during its Golden Age, 10th century earliest manuscript is Freising manuscripts)
- Classical Tibetan (religious and literary language of Tibet, 10th century to present)
- Classical Japanese (language of Heian period literature, 10th to 12th centuries)
- Middle Korean (language of Goryeo and Early Joseon, 10th to 16th centuries)
- Old Burmese (language of the Pagan kingdom, 11th to 13th centuries)
- Old Occitan (language of the troubadours, 11th to 14th centuries)
- Middle High German (language of Medieval German literature, 11th to 14th centuries)
- Old Serbian (language of Serbia before its conquest by the Ottoman Empire, 11th to 14th centuries)
- Classical Telugu (the earliest available literary work is the Telugu Mahabharata, AD 1067)
- Classical Malayalam (the earliest extant prose work is the Ramacharitam, 12th century)
- Classical Newar (lingua franca of Nepal Mandala, 12th to 18th centuries)
- Old Norse (language of the Viking Age, from the 12th century)
- Middle Bulgarian (language of the Second Bulgarian Empire, 12th to 15th centuries)
- Middle Low German (language of the Hanseatic League, 12th to 17th centuries)
- Old Icelandic (language of the Icelandic sagas, 13th century)
- Old Catalan (language of literature in the Crown of Aragon, 13th to 14th centuries)
- Manding (language of the Mali Empire, 13th to 16th centuries)
- Old Ruthenian (language of the Grand Duchy of Lithuania, 13th to 16th centuries)
- Classical Irish or Classical Gaelic (language of the 13th to 18th centuries Scottish and Irish Gaelic literature)
- Middle English (language of The Canterbury Tales, 14th to 15th centuries, with many divergent written dialects, but partially standardized on London speech)
- Middle French (language of the French Renaissance, 14th to 17th centuries)
- Old Hungarian (language of Hungarian literature, 14th to 15th centuries)
- Songhay (lingua franca of the Songhai Empire, 14th to 16th centuries)
- Early New High German (language of the Holy Roman Empire, the German Renaissance, and the Protestant Reformation, 14th to 17th centuries)
- Classical Malay (language of Maritime Southeast Asia, 14th to 18th centuries)
- Chagatai (classical Turkic language of Central Asia and the Volga 14th to early 20th centuries)
- Rekhta (poetic language of Delhi and the Northern/Central Indian subcontinent, 13th to 18th centuries, became standardized as Urdu in the 19th century)

=== Amerindian languages ===
- Classical Maya (language of the mature Maya civilization, 3rd to 9th centuries)
- Classical Nahuatl (lingua franca of 16th century central Mexico)
- Classical Quechua (lingua franca of the 16th century Inca Empire)
- Classical Kʼicheʼ (language of 16th century Guatemala)
- Classical Tupi (language of 16th century Brazil)
- Classical Guarani (language of 16th century Paraguay)

=== Early modern period ===
- Awadhi (one of two major literary traditions of Northern India during Mughal rule led to its use by poets, 14th to 18th centuries)
- Braj Bhasha (the second of two major literary traditions in early modern Northern India used by poets, 15th-19th centuries)
- Renaissance Italian (language of the Italian Renaissance, 15th to 16th centuries)
- Late Old Portuguese (language of Portuguese Golden Age, 15th to 16th centuries)
- Early Modern Spanish (language of the Spanish Golden Age, 15th to 17th centuries)
- Classical Azeri (lingua franca of the Caucasus Mountain region and language of Azeri literature, 15th to 18th centuries)
- Old Lithuanian (the other language of the Grand Duchy of Lithuania, 16th to 17th centuries)
- Early Modern English (language of the King James Bible, the Book of Common Prayer, and Shakespeare, 16th to 17th centuries)
- Middle Polish (language of the Polish Golden Age, 16th to 18th centuries)
- Classical Ottoman Turkish (language of poetry and administration of the Ottoman Empire, 16th to 19th centuries)
- Ryukyuan (language of the Ryukyu Kingdom, 16th to 19th centuries)
- Manchu (language of the Manchus who ruled China, 16th to 20th centuries)
- Classical Mongolian (language of Mongolian literature and translations of Tibetan Buddhist religious texts, 17th to 20th centuries)
- Early Modern Korean (language of Late Joseon, 17th to 19th centuries)
- Early Modern Dutch (language of the Dutch Golden Age, 17th century)
- Classical French (language of France under Louis XIV to Napoleon, 17th to 18th centuries)
- Classical Ladino (language of Sephardic Jewish literature, 17th to 19th centuries)
- Early Modern Russian (language of the Russian Empire, 18th to 19th centuries)
- Sadhu Bhasha (the modern language Bengali from 1820s to 1940s)
- Classical Yiddish (language of the Yiddish Renaissance, 19th–20th centuries)

== See also ==
- Ancient language
- Aureation, an example of the influence of a classical language on a later language
- Chinese classics
- Classical languages of India
- Classicism
- Classics
- Golden age (metaphor)
- Lingua franca
- List of languages by first written accounts
- Literary language
- Sacred language
- Official language
- Standard language
- World language

== Sources ==
- Knight, Sarah; Tilg, Stefan, eds. (2015). The Oxford Handbook of Neo-Latin. New York: Oxford University Press. ISBN 978-0-19-088699-8. OL 28648475M.
- Nair, K. Ramachandran (1997). "Malayalam". In Ayyappapanicker (ed.). Medieval Indian Literature:An Anthology. Sahitya Akademi. ISBN 81-260-0365-0.
