= Gilbert Lazard =

French linguist (1920–2018)

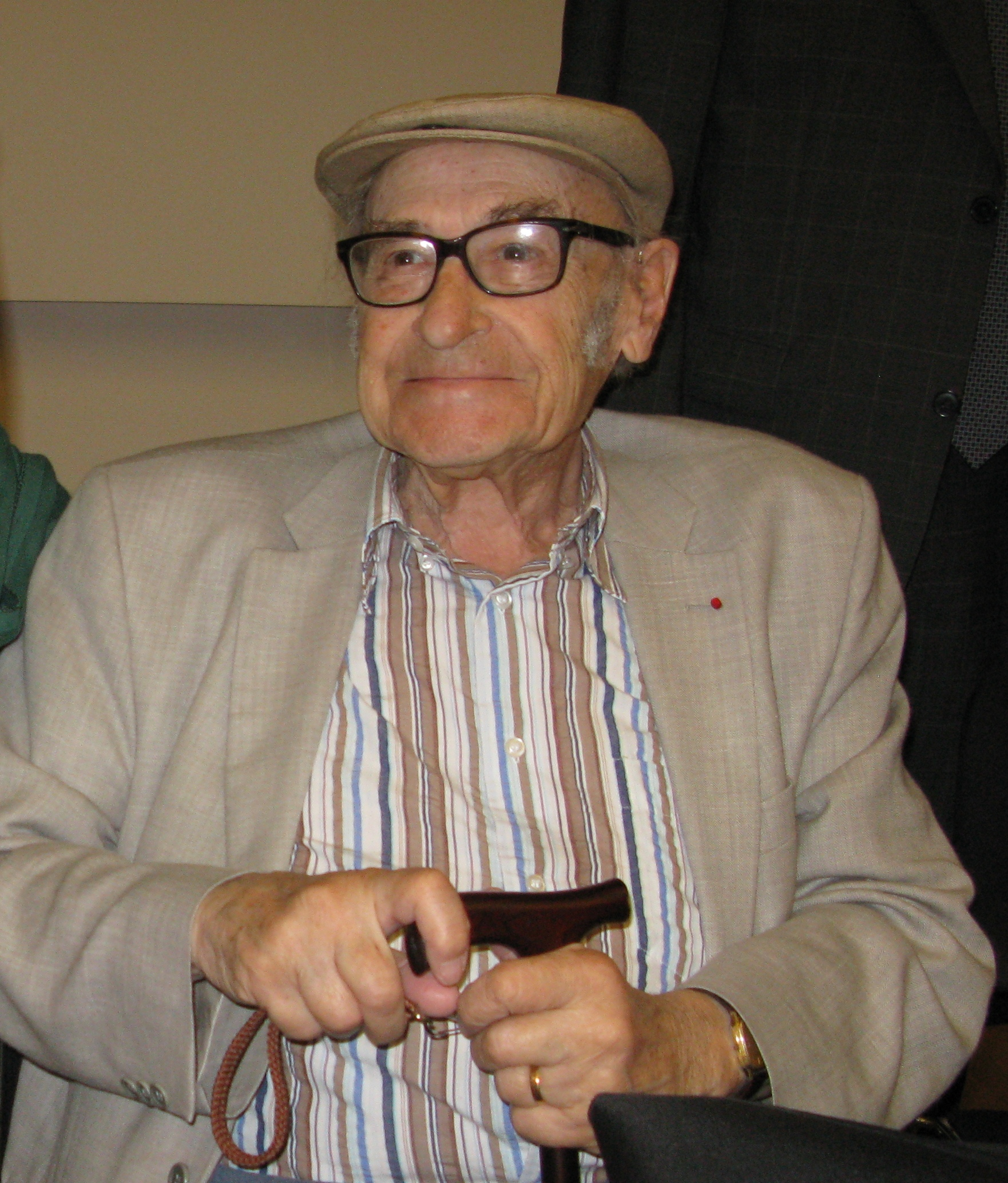
- Lazard in 2013
- Born: February 4, 1920
- Died: September 6, 2018 (aged 98)
- Scientific career
- Doctoral students: Ali Shariati

Gilbert Lazard (4 February 1920 – 6 September 2018) was a French linguist and Iranologist. His works include the study of various Iranian languages, translations of classical Persian poetry, and research on linguistic typology, notably on morphosyntactic alignment. He also studied various Polynesian languages most notably the Tahitian language.

== Biography ==
Gilbert Lazard was born in Paris on 4 February 1920. He studied at the École normale supérieure, where he received a solid training in classical studies and linguistics. During the Second World War, he joined the French Resistance. In 1944, he was arrested by German forces and deported to the Dachau concentration camp, from which he was liberated in 1945.

After the war, Lazard pursued advanced studies in Iranian languages. In 1948, he obtained a degree in Persian from the École des langues orientales (today INALCO), marking the beginning of his academic specialization in Iranian linguistics. His scholarly work played a major role in the study of the historical development of Persian, particularly the transition from Middle Persian to New Persian.

Alongside his work on Iranian languages and Persian classical literature, Lazard also made significant contributions to general linguistics, especially in the fields of syntactic typology and morphosyntactic alignment. He also conducted important research on the Tahitian language and broader Polynesian linguistics.

== Career ==
Gilbert Lazard studied at the École normale supérieure, graduated in 1946 (agrégation de grammaire) and 1948 (Persian language diploma of the École nationale des langues orientales vivantes, now the Institut national des langues et civilisations orientales - INALCO). He became a professor of Persian at INALCO from 1958 to 1966.

From 1951 to 1969, he was in charge of the Iranian civilization course at the Sorbonne, where he became a lecturer (maître de conférences) (in 1960) and a professor (in 1966) for Iranian language and civilization . From 1969 to 1981, he taught at the University of Paris III: Sorbonne Nouvelle, where he was from 1969 to 1974 the director of the Orientalism department and from 1972 to 1987 the director of the Institute for Iranian studies (Institut d'études iraniennes).

From 1972 to 1990, he held the research position of directeur d'études for linguistics and Iranian philology at the École pratique des hautes études.

From 1972 to 1983, he led the research team on Iranian language, literature and culture associated to the Centre national de la recherche scientifique (CNRS) and the University of Paris III: Sorbonne Nouvelle. From 1984 to 1993, he held responsibility for the CNRS research group « Recherche interlinguistique sur les variations d’actance et leurs corrélats » (Interlinguistic research on actancy variations and their correlates).

On November 14, 1980, he was elected an ordinary member of the Académie des inscriptions et belles-lettres.

He was a member of numerous learned societies, including the Association pour l’avancement des études iraniennes, the Société de linguistique de Paris, the Société asiatique and the Association for Linguistic Typology.

== Bibliography ==
- Lazard, Gilbert. Actancy, Berlin, Boston: De Gruyter Mouton, 2011. https://doi.org/10.1515/9783110808100
- Gignoux, Philippe; de Fouchécour, Charles Henri (1989). Études irano-aryennes offertes à Gilbert Lazard. Studia Iranica (in French). Vol. 7. Paris: Association pour l'avancement des études iraniennes. pp. xviii-383-[27]. OCLC 464192740.
- de Fouchécour, Charles Henri (1995). "Lazard, Gilbert". In Labrousse, Pierre (ed.). Langues'O 1795-1995 : Deux siècles d'histoire de l'École des langues orientales (in French). Paris: Hervas. p. 88. ISBN 2-903-11890-6. OCLC 35816391.
- Amr Helmy, Ibrahim, ed. (2011). "Du persan à la typologie : L'apport de Gilbert Lazard". Faits de Langues (in French). 38.
