= Mark Baker (linguist) =

American linguist

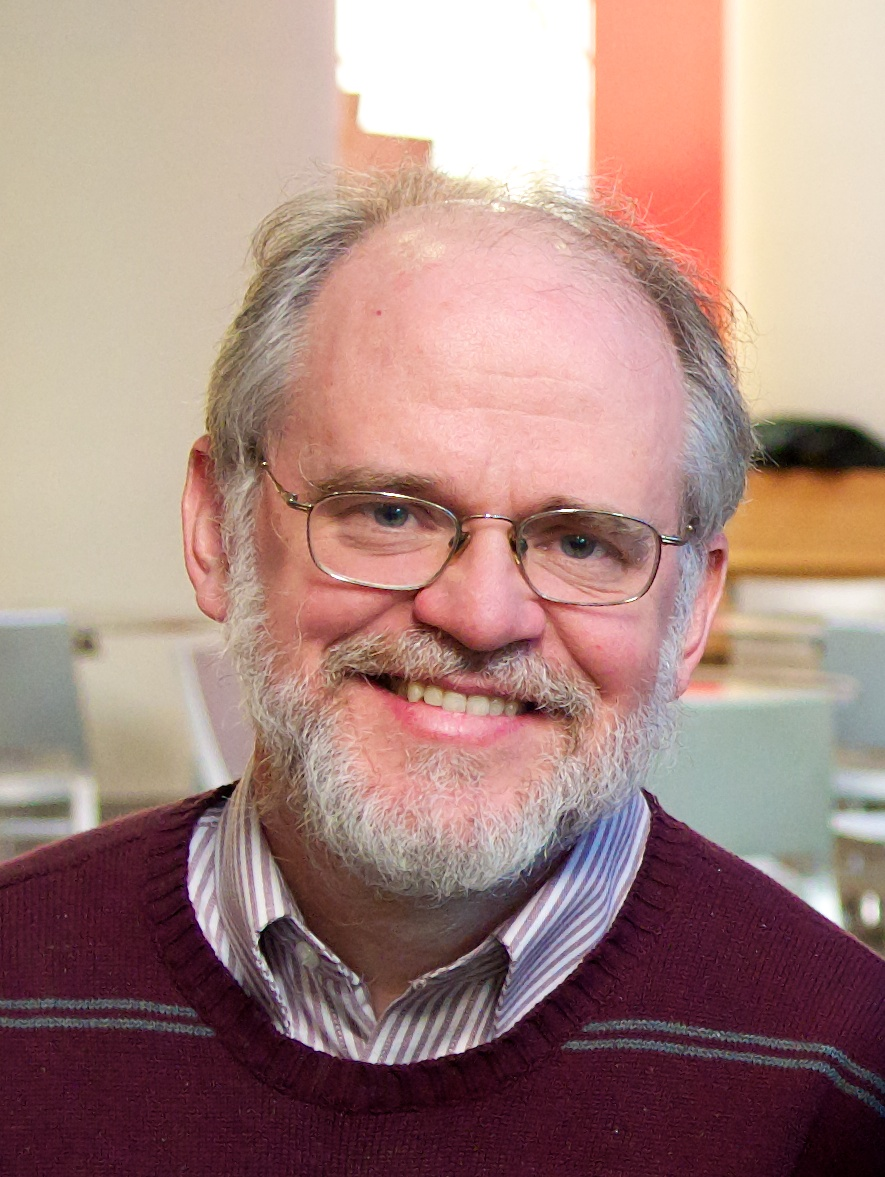
- Born: 1959 (age 66–67)
- Education: MIT
- Scientific career
- Fields: Syntax; generative grammar
- Workplaces: Rutgers University; McGill University
- Doctoral advisor: Noam Chomsky
- Website: Rutgers faculty page

Mark Cleland Baker (born 1959) is an American linguist. He received his Ph.D. from MIT in 1985 and has taught at Rutgers University since 1998. Baker frequently was a faculty member at the Linguistic Society of America's Summer Institute and, prior to coming to Rutgers, was a faculty member at McGill University (1986–1998). He worked with the Mohawk language for several years, also serving as a consultant on language revitalization for the Mohawk. Working within generative grammar, he has written several books about the formal analysis of polysynthetic languages.

Baker coined the term code-talker paradox in 2001 to describe the Navajo code talking used during World War II. Code talkers are able to create a language mutually intelligible to each other but completely unintelligible to everyone who does not know the code. This causes a conflict of interests without actually causing any conflict at all. In the case of Navajo code-talkers, cryptanalysts were unable to decode messages in Navajo, even when using the most sophisticated methods available. At the same time, the code talkers were able to encrypt and decrypt messages quickly and easily by translating them into and from Navajo. Thus the code talker paradox refers to how human languages can be so similar and different at once: so similar that one can learn them both and gain the ability to translate from one to the other, yet so different that if someone knows one language but does not know another, it is not always possible to derive the meaning of a text by analyzing it or infer it from the other language.

== Bibliography ==
- Incorporation: A theory of grammatical function changing (University of Chicago Press, 1988) ISBN 0226035417
- The Polysynthesis Parameter (Oxford University Press, 1996)
- The Atoms of Language (Basic Books, 2001)
- Lexical Categories: Verbs, Nouns and Adjectives (Cambridge University Press, 2002)
- The Syntax of Agreement and Concord (Cambridge University Press, 2008)
- The Soul Hypothesis: Investigations into the Existence of the Soul (Continuum, 2011) – editor (with Stewart Goetz) and contributor
