= Yana traditional narratives =

Traditional narratives of the Yana people

Yana traditional narratives include myths, legends, tales, and oral histories preserved by the Yana people of the eastern Sacramento Valley and foothills of northeastern California.

Yana oral literature belongs primarily to the central California tradition, but it also shows influences from the Great Basin and Plateau cultural provinces. (See also Traditional narratives (Native California).)

== On-line examples of Yana narratives ==
- "Yana Texts" by Edward Sapir (1910)

== Sources for Yana narratives ==
- Bright, William. 1993. A Coyote Reader. University of California Press, Berkeley. (Narrative based on Sapir 1910, pp. 105-117.)
- Curtin, Jeremiah. 1898. Creation Myths of Primitive America in Relation to the Religious History and Mental Development of Mankind. Little, Brown, Boston. (Reprinted in 1995 as "Creation Myths of America.") (13 Yana myths, including Theft of Fire, with commentaries.)
- Gifford, Edward Winslow, and Gwendoline Harris Block. 1930. California Indian Nights. Arthur H. Clark, Glendale, California. (Four previously published narratives, pp. 129-132, 198-201, 216-218, 235-237.)
- Kroeber, A. L. 1925. Handbook of the Indians of California. Bureau of American Ethnology Bulletin No. 78. Washington, D.C. (Brief notes, p. 341.)
- Luthin, Herbert W. 2002. Surviving through the Days: A California Indian Reader. University of California Press, Berkeley. (A Yahi narrative collected from Ishi by Edward Sapir in 1915, pp. 152-177.)
- Sapir, Edward. 1910. "Yana Texts". University of California Publications in American Archaeology and Ethnology 9:1-235. Berkeley. (Myths and other texts, including Theft of Fire, Loon Woman, and Bear and Fawns, collected by Dixon in 1900 and by Sapir in 1910, with some comparative notes.)
- Sapir, Edward. 1923. "Text Analyses of Three Yana Dialects". University of California Publications in American Archaeology and Ethnology 20:263-294. Berkeley. (Central Yana and Yahi narratives, pp. 266-267, 283-285.)
- Swann, Brian. 1994. Coming to Light: Contemporary Translations of the Native Literatures of North America. Random House, New York. ("Dragonfly Woman" and "Rolling Skull," recorded from Betty Brown and Sam Batwi by Edward Sapir in 1907, pp. 717-736.)

== See also ==
- Yana language
