= J. David Sapir =

American linguist (1932–2024)

J. David Sapir (1932 – August 30, 2024) was an American linguist, anthropologist and photographer.

== Life and career ==
The son of Edward Sapir, he was born in 1932. After undergraduate studies in anthropology at Yale University and completing his PhD at Harvard University in 1964, he was assistant professor at the University of Pennsylvania (1966–1972) and professor of Anthropology at the University of Virginia from 1973 until his retirement. He is known for his research on Jola languagesas well as his application of still photography. He was editor of the journal Visual Anthropology Review.

Sapir died on August 30, 2024, at the age of 91 and was survived by his wife, Betty and their three children.

== Selected publications ==
- 2011. A Grammar of Diola-Fogny: A Language Spoken in the Basse-Casamance Region of Senegal. Cambridge University Press
- 1994 - "On Fixing Ethnographic Shadows (review)." American Ethnologist 21 (4):867-885. <https://www.jstor.org/stable/646846>
- 1981 - "Hyenas, Lepers and Blacksmiths in Kujamaat Social Thought." American Ethnologist 8 (3):526-43. <https://www.jstor.org/stable/644300>
- 1977 The Social Use of Metaphor: Essays on the Anthropology of Rhetoric (with J. C. Crocker, eds.) Philadelphia: University of Pennsylvania Press.
- 1977 - "Fecal Animals, an Example of Complementary Totemism." Man 12:1-21. <https://doi.org/10.2307/2800990>
- 1970 - "Kujaama, Symbolic Separation among the Diola-Fogny." American Anthropologist 72 (6):1330-48. <https://www.jstor.org/stable/672851>
- 1965 - The Music of the Diola-Fogny of the Casamance, Sénégal. New York: Folkways Records.
- 1965 - A Grammar of Diola-Fogny, Cambridge: Cambridge University Press.
