= Yahi dialect =

Dialect of the extinct Yana language

Yahi
- Native to: US
- Region: California
- Ethnicity: Yahi people, a subgroup of the Yana
- Extinct: 1916, with the death of Ishi
- Language family: Hokan?: Yana; Southern Yana; Yahi

Language codes
- ISO 639-3: –
- Glottolog: yahi1243
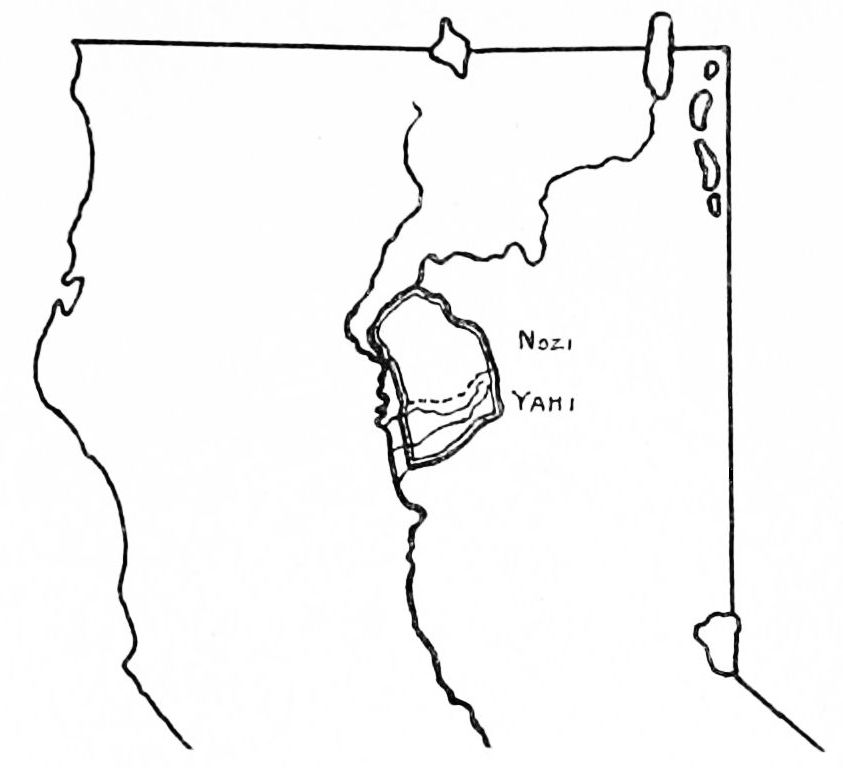
- Distribution of Yahi and Nozi (Northern and Central Yana) peoples

Yahi was a dialect of the extinct Yana language that was spoken in the upper Sacramento Valley area, roughly in the area between Mill Creek and Deer Creek. It is one of the southern dialects of Yana, which is a language isolate, though with possible connections to Hokan. Yana is known as having been the language of Ishi, the last surviving Yana Indian, who worked with anthropologists to make a record of the language and culture.

== History ==
The last documented speaker of Yahi was a man called Ishi who caused a scientific stir when he made contact with the outside world in 1911, long after the Yahi had been assumed to be extinct. Together with the language, he died in 1916.

== Vocabulary ==
Yahi distinguishes male and female forms with male forms, frequently marked with the suffix -na, generally longer than female forms. Some examples are:

Male Form	Female Form	Meaning
diwai-ja	diwai-tch	see me!
t'en'na	t'et	grizzly bear
yana	yah	person

=== Examples ===
Some language samples from Kroeber, T

Yahi	English
ähä	yes
k'u'i	no
kuwi	shaman
mudjaúpa	chief
sake mahale	menstruating woman
saltu	white person
siwini	yellow pine
wataurisi	bastard

=== Pronouns ===
Yahi	English
ai'numa	you (formal)

auna - fire

=== Numerals ===
Some numerals from Sapir et al.,

Numeral	Yahi
1	baigu
2	uxmic'igu
3	bulmic'igu
4	daumigu
5	xaaʒan
6	baiwawi
7	
8	
9	
10	xaaʒanwilsamc'gu
20	
40	
60	
80	

== Samples ==
Yahi	English
achi djeyauna?	what is his name?
ine me yahi?	are you an Indian?
wo-wi	my house

== See also ==
- Yana traditional narratives
