= Eloise Jelinek =

American linguist

- Born: Mary Eloise Bull; February 2, 1924; Dallas, Texas, US
- Died: December 21, 2007 (aged 83); Tucson, Arizona, US

Academic background
- Education: University of Arizona
- Thesis: On Defining Categories: AUX and PREDICATE in Colloquial Egyptian Arabic (1981)
- Doctoral advisor: Adrian Akmajian

Academic work
- Discipline: Linguist
- Sub-discipline: Syntax

Eloise Jelinek (February 2, 1924 in Dallas – December 21, 2007 in Tucson) was an American linguist specializing in the study of syntax. Her 1981 doctoral dissertation at the University of Arizona was titled "On Defining Categories: AUX and PREDICATE in Colloquial Egyptian Arabic". She was a member of the faculty of the University of Arizona from 1981 to 1992.

She became particularly known for her Pronominal Argument Hypothesis of syntax based on data from the Navajo language, which holds that in some languages the pronominal affixes on the verb should be considered the syntactic arguments of the verbs, rather than the noun phrases that occur free in the clause, which should only be considered adjuncts.

Through her work on many endangered languages she demonstrated that less-studied languages often challenged the theories of generative linguistics, and she worked to develop ways of integrating this data into the generative paradigm. Among the languages that she worked on are the Straits Salish languages Samish and Lummi, as well as Navajo, Choctaw, and Yaqui.

== Publications ==
- 2001. "Unergative and Unaccusative Verbs in Yaqui". Uto-Aztecan Papers in Honor of Wick Miller. Eugene Casad, ed. University of California Press. With Fernando Escalante.
- 2000. "Predicate Raising in Lummi, Straits Salish". The Syntax of Verb Initial Languages, Andrew Carnie and Eithne Guilfoyle, eds., Oxford.
- 2000. "Navajo as a Discourse Configurational Language". In Athabaskan Syntax: Perspectives on a Language Family. Theodore Fernald and Paul Platero, eds., Oxford. With Mary Willie.
- 2000. "Datives and Argument Hierarchies". In Papers in Honor of Ken Hale. Andrew Carnie, Eloise Jelinek and Mary Willie, eds., MITWPL Endangered and Less well-known Languages Fund Series #1, Cambridge MA.
- 1999. "Accent in Yaqui". INTERNATIONAL JOURNAL OF AMERICAN LINGUISTICS. With Richard Demers and Fernando Escalante.
- 1998. "Voice and Transitivity as Functional Projections in Yaqui". The Projection of Arguments. Butt, Miriam and Wilhelm Geuder, eds., CSLI, Stanford.
- 1997. "Prepositions in Northern Straits Salish and the noun/verb question." Salish Languages and Linguistics. Czaykowska-Higgins, Ewa and M. Dale Kinkade, eds., Mouton.
- 1997. "Reduplication as a Quantifier in Salish". INTERNATIONAL JOURNAL OF AMERICAN LINGUISTICS, 63.3. With Richard Demers.
- 1996. "Definiteness and Second Position Clitics in Straits Salish." Approaching Second: Second Position Clitics and Related Phenomena. Aaron Halpern and Arnold Zwicky, eds., CSLI, Stanford.
- 1996. "Psych Verbs in Navajo." Athabaskan Language Studies. Essays in Honor of Robert W. Young. Edited by Eloise Jelinek, Sally Midgette, Keren Rice and Leslie Saxon. University of New Mexico Press. With Mary Willie.
- 1995. "Quantification in Straits Salish." Quantification in Natural Languages, Emmon Bach, Eloise Jelinek, Angelika Kratzer and Barbara Partee, eds., Kluwer.
- 1995. "Distributing Arguments." NATURAL LANGUAGE SEMANTICS 3.2. With Molly Diesing.
- 1994. "Predicates and Pronominal Arguments in Straits Salish". LANGUAGE 70.4, pp. 697–736 With Richard Demers.
- 1993. "Ergative Splits and Argument Type". Invited paper. Papers on Case and Agreement. MIT Working Papers in Linguistics #18, Bobaljik, J. and C. Phillips, eds. pp. 15 – 42.
- 1990. "Grammatical Relations and Coindexing in Inverse Systems." Grammatical Relations. A Cross-Theoretical Perspective. Dziwirek, K. et al., eds., CSLI, Stanford.
- 1989. "Possessive Sentences in Yaqui". Festschrift for Mary Haas. W. Bright, ed., University of California Press. With Fernando Escalante.
- 1989. "The bi-Construction and Pronominal Arguments in Apachean". Athabaskan Linguistics, Rice, Karen and E. Cook, eds. Mouton. With Merton Sandoval.
- 1989. "The Case Split and Argument Type in Choctaw." Configurationality: The Typology of Asymmetries. Maracz, Lazlo K. and Pieter Muysken (eds.), Foris, Dordrecht.
- 1987. "Headless Relatives and Pronominal Arguments: A Typological Perspective." Native American Languages and Grammatical Typology. Papers from a Chicago Linguistics Society Parasession. Kroeber, Paul D. and Robert E. Moore, eds. Indiana University Linguistics Club, Bloomington.
- 1987. "Auxiliaries and Ergative Splits: A Typological Parameter." Historical Development of Auxiliaries, Harris, Martin and Paolo Ramat, eds., Trends in Linguistics, Studies and Monographs 35. Mouton de Gruyter.
- 1984. "Empty Categories, Case, and Configurationality." NATURAL LANGUAGE AND LINGUISTIC THEORY, 2.1.
