= Actancy =

Term in syntax

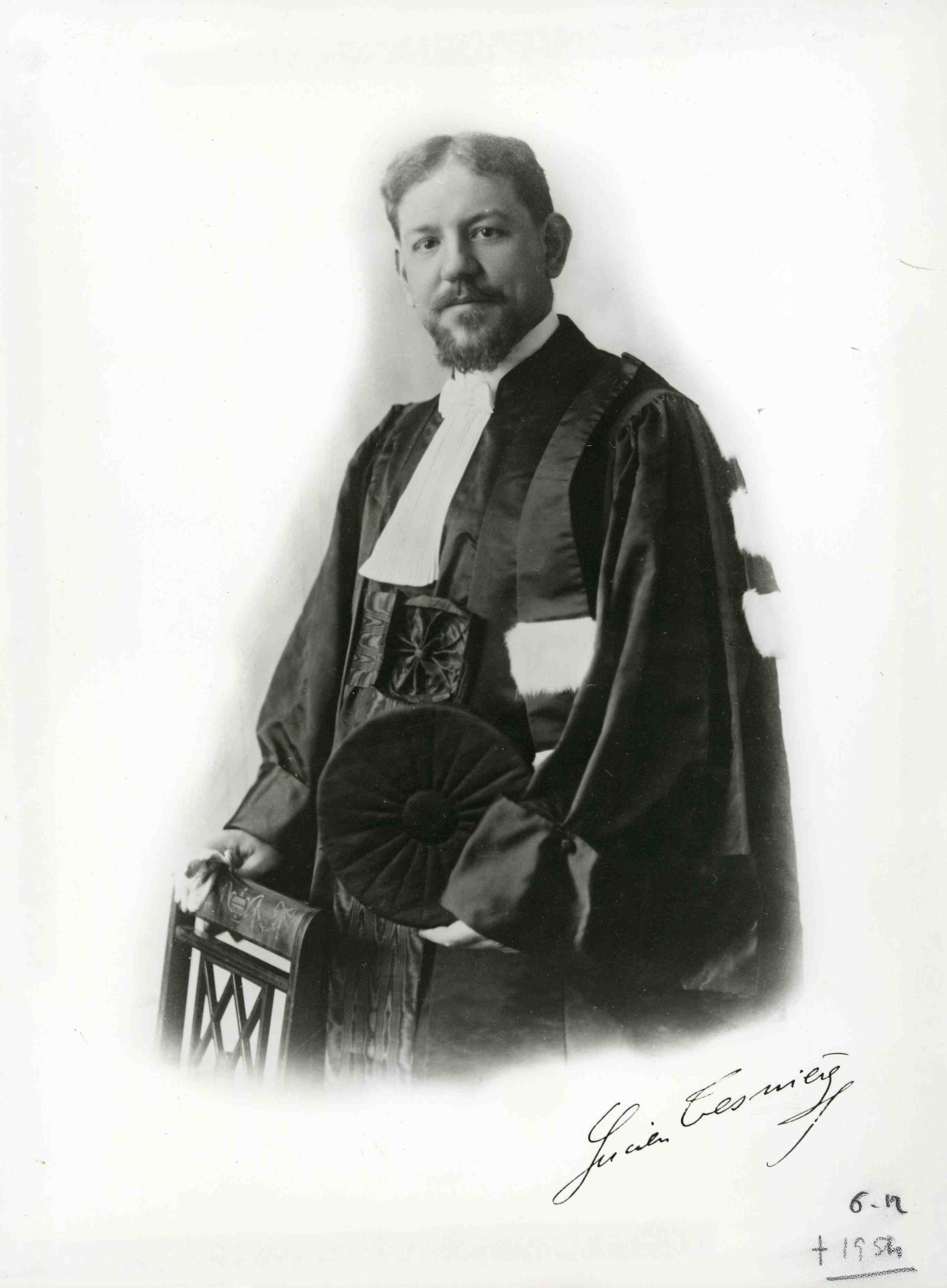
French linguist Lucien Tesnière who coined the French word actants

Actancy (French: l'actance) is a term in syntax and grammar describing the relationship between a verb predicate and its nominal arguments. It attempts to study and describe actants or clausal components which identify the nominal participants in a verbal process which may be the subject, direct object, or the indirect object of the verb.

Actants is a French term coined by Lucien Tesnière, and its usage has been extended into English. However, its usage is more common in continental linguistics than in English language linguistics. In French, the term l'actance has the more general meaning of the study of verb arguments and is not as narrow as the English loan.

In the work of Gilbert Lazard, the concept of actancy is restricted only to the morphosyntactic level of linguistic analysis.

== See also ==
- Verb argument
- Verb phrase
- French grammar
- Lucien Tesnière
