= Language: An Introduction to the Study of Speech =

Book by Edward Sapir

- Author: Edward Sapir
- Language: English
- Subject: Linguistics
- Publisher: Harcourt, Brace and Company
- Publication date: 1921
- Media type: Print
- ISBN: 9781108063784

Language: An Introduction to the Study of Speech is a seminal book by Edward Sapir in which the author offers an introduction to his ideas about language.
