= Edward Sapir =

American linguist and anthropologist (1884–1939)

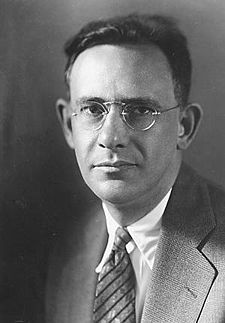
- Edward Sapir, c. 1910
- Born: January 26, 1884; Lauenburg, Kingdom of Prussia, German Empire (now Lębork, Poland)
- Died: February 4, 1939 (aged 55); New Haven, Connecticut, U.S.
- Citizenship: United States
- Known for: Classification of Native American languages Linguistic relativity Anthropological linguistics

Academic background
- Education: Columbia University (BA, MA, PhD)
- Thesis: The Takelma Language of Southwestern Oregon (1909)
- Doctoral advisor: Franz Boas

Academic work
- Discipline: Linguistics; Anthropology
- Institutions: University of Chicago; Canadian Museum of Civilization; Columbia University; Yale University
- Doctoral students: Li Fang-Kuei; Mary Haas; Morris Swadesh; Kenneth Pike; Harry Hoijer; Leslie A. White; Robert Redfield; J. David Sapir; Charles Hockett; John Dollard

Edward Sapir (/səˈpɪər/; January 26, 1884 – February 4, 1939) was an American anthropologist-linguist, and one of the most important figures in the development of the discipline of linguistics in the United States. Born in German Pomerania, in what is now northern Poland, his family emigrated to the United States of America when he was a child. He studied Germanic linguistics at Columbia, where he came under the influence of Franz Boas, who inspired him to work on Native American languages. While finishing his Ph.D. he went to California to work with Alfred Kroeber documenting the indigenous languages there. He was employed by the Geological Survey of Canada for fifteen years, where he came into his own as one of the most significant linguists in North America, the other being Leonard Bloomfield. He was offered a professorship at the University of Chicago, and stayed for several years continuing to work for the professionalization of the discipline of linguistics. By the end of his life he was professor of anthropology at Yale. Among his many students were the linguists Mary Haas and Morris Swadesh, and anthropologists such as Fred Eggan and Hortense Powdermaker.

With his linguistic background, Sapir became the one student of Boas to develop most completely the relationship between linguistics and anthropology. Sapir studied the ways in which language and culture influence each other, and he was interested in the relation between linguistic differences, and differences in cultural world views. This part of his thinking was developed by his student Benjamin Lee Whorf into the principle of linguistic relativity or the "Sapir–Whorf" hypothesis. In anthropology Sapir is known as an early proponent of the importance of psychology to anthropology, maintaining that studying the nature of relationships between different individual personalities is important for the ways in which culture and society develop.

Among his major contributions to linguistics is his classification of Indigenous languages of the Americas, upon which he elaborated for most of his professional life. He played an important role in developing the modern concept of the phoneme, greatly advancing the understanding of phonology. Before Sapir it was generally considered impossible to apply the methods of historical linguistics to languages of indigenous peoples because they were believed to be more primitive than the Indo-European languages. Sapir was the first to prove that the methods of comparative linguistics were equally valid when applied to indigenous languages. In the 1929 edition of Encyclopædia Britannica he published what was then the most authoritative classification of Native American languages, and the first based on evidence from modern comparative linguistics. He was the first to produce evidence for the classification of the Algic, Uto-Aztecan, and Na-Dene languages. He proposed some language families that are not considered to have been adequately demonstrated, but which continue to generate investigation such as Hokan and Penutian.

He specialized in the study of Athabascan languages, Chinookan languages, and Uto-Aztecan languages, producing important grammatical descriptions of Takelma, Wishram, and Southern Paiute. Later in his career he also worked with Yiddish, Hebrew, and Chinese, as well as Germanic languages, and he also was invested in the development of an International Auxiliary Language.

== Life ==
=== Childhood and youth ===
Sapir was born into a family of Lithuanian Jews in Lauenburg (now Lębork) in the Province of Pomerania where his father, Jacob David Sapir, worked as a cantor. The family was not Orthodox, and his father maintained his ties to Judaism through its music. The Sapir family did not stay long in Pomerania and never accepted German as a nationality. Edward Sapir's first language was Yiddish, and later English. In 1888, when he was four years old, the family moved to Liverpool, England, and in 1890 to the United States, to Richmond, Virginia. Here Edward Sapir lost his younger brother Max to typhoid fever. His father had difficulty keeping a job in a synagogue and finally settled in New York on the Lower East Side, where the family lived in poverty. As Jacob Sapir could not provide for his family, Sapir's mother, Eva Seagal Sapir, opened a shop to supply the basic necessities. They formally divorced in 1910. After settling in New York, Edward Sapir was raised mostly by his mother, who stressed the importance of education for upward social mobility, and turned the family increasingly away from Judaism. Even though Eva Sapir was an important influence, Sapir received his lust for knowledge and interest in scholarship, aesthetics, and music from his father. At age 14 Sapir won a Pulitzer scholarship to the prestigious Horace Mann high school, but he chose not to attend the school which he found too posh, going instead to DeWitt Clinton High School, and saving the scholarship money for his college education. Through the scholarship Sapir supplemented his mother's meager earnings.

=== Columbia ===
Sapir entered Columbia in 1901, still paying with the Pulitzer scholarship. Columbia at this time was one of the few elite private universities that did not limit admission of Jewish applicants with implicit quotas around 12 percent—approximately 40% of incoming students at Columbia were Jewish. Sapir earned both a B.A. (1904) and an M.A. (1905) in Germanic philology from Columbia, before embarking on his Ph.D. in Anthropology which he completed in 1909.

==== College ====
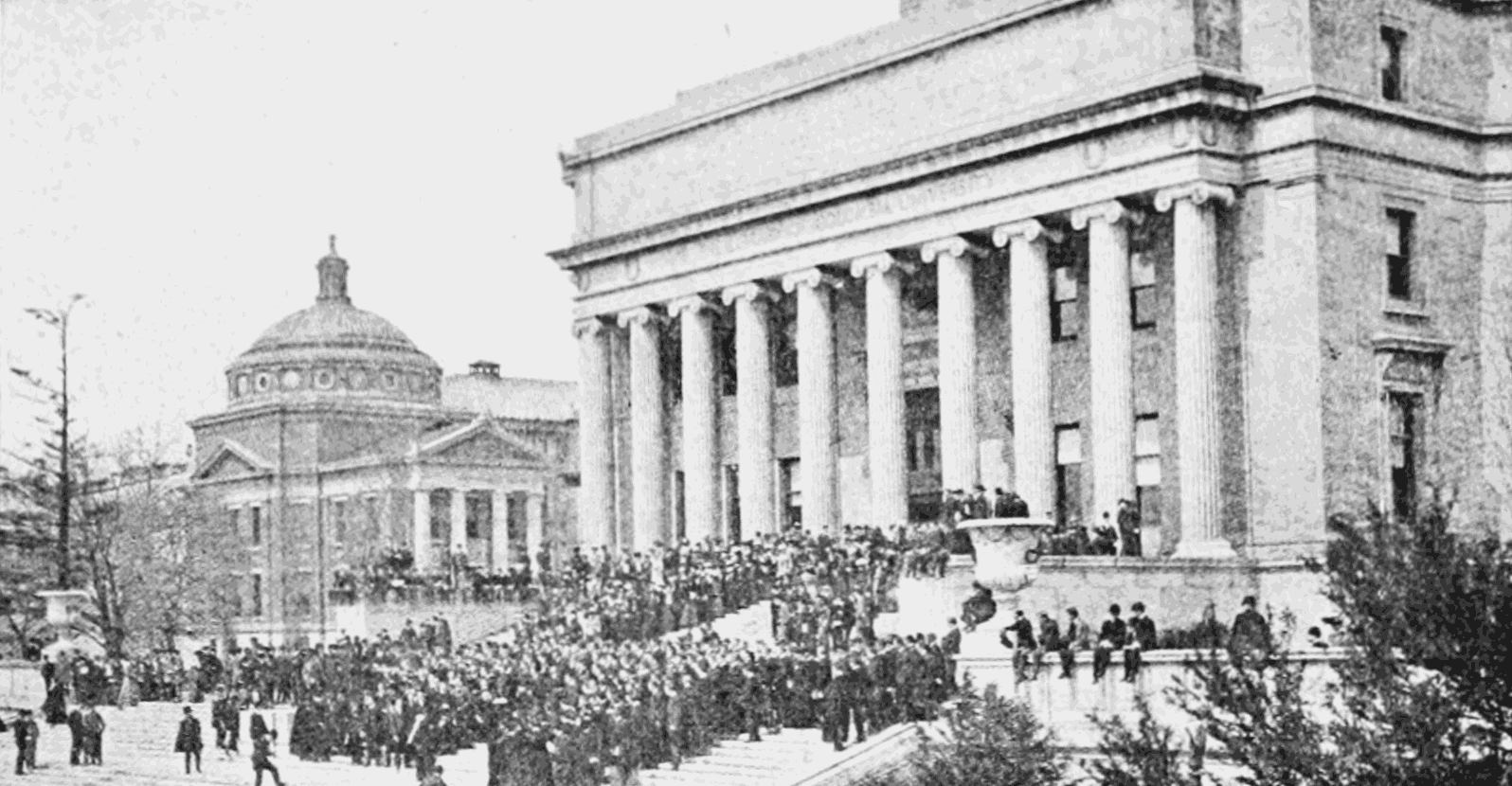
Columbia University library in 1903

Sapir emphasized language study in his college years at Columbia, studying Latin, Greek, and French for eight semesters. From his sophomore year he additionally began to focus on Germanic languages, completing coursework in Gothic, Old High German, Old Saxon, Icelandic, Dutch, Swedish, and Danish. Through Germanics professor William Carpenter, Sapir was exposed to methods of comparative linguistics that were being developed into a more scientific framework than the traditional philological approach. He also took courses in Sanskrit, and complemented his language studies by studying music in the department of the famous composer Edward MacDowell (though it is uncertain whether Sapir ever studied with MacDowell himself). In his last year in college Sapir enrolled in the course "Introduction to Anthropology", with Professor Livingston Farrand, who taught the Boas "four field" approach to anthropology. He also enrolled in an advanced anthropology seminar taught by Boas himself, a course that would completely change the direction of his career.

==== Influence of Boas ====
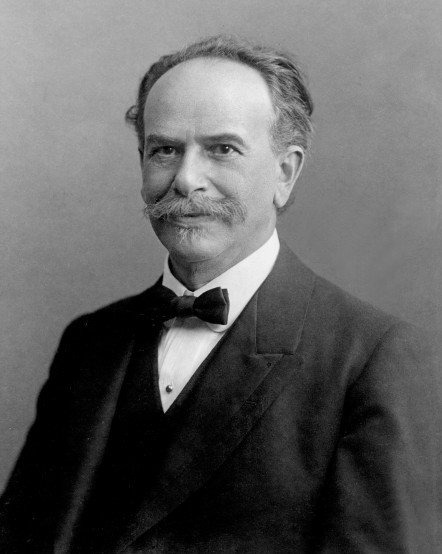
Franz Boas

Although still in college, Sapir was allowed to participate in the Boas graduate seminar on American Languages, which included translations of Native American and Inuit myths collected by Boas. In this way Sapir was introduced to Indigenous American languages while he kept working on his M.A. in Germanic linguistics. Robert Lowie later said that Sapir's fascination with indigenous languages stemmed from the seminar with Boas in which Boas used examples from Native American languages to disprove all of Sapir's common-sense assumptions about the basic nature of language. Sapir's 1905 Master's thesis was an analysis of Johann Gottfried Herder's Treatise on the Origin of Language, and included examples from Inuit and Native American languages, not at all familiar to a Germanicist. The thesis criticized Herder for retaining a Biblical chronology, too shallow to allow for the observable diversification of languages, but he also argued with Herder that all of the world's languages have equal aesthetic potentials and grammatical complexity. He ended the paper by calling for a "very extended study of all the various existing stocks of languages, in order to determine the most fundamental properties of language" – almost a program statement for the modern study of linguistic typology, and a very Boasian approach.

In 1906 he finished his coursework, having focused the last year on courses in anthropology and taking seminars such as Primitive Culture with Farrand, Ethnology with Boas, Archaeology and courses in Chinese language and culture with Berthold Laufer. He also maintained his Indo-European studies with courses in Celtic, Old Saxon, Swedish, and Sanskrit. Having finished his coursework, Sapir moved on to his doctoral fieldwork, spending several years in short-term appointments while working on his dissertation.

==== Early fieldwork ====
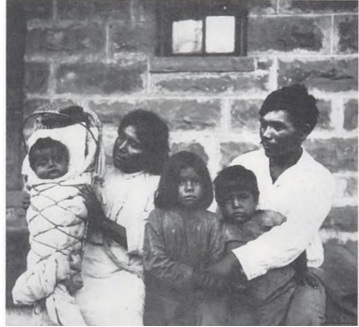
Tony Tillohash with family. Tillohash was Sapir's collaborator on the famous description of the Southern Paiute language.

Sapir's first fieldwork was on the Wishram Chinook language in the summer of 1905, funded by the Bureau of American Ethnology. This first experience with Native American languages in the field was closely overseen by Boas, who was particularly interested in having Sapir gather ethnological information for the Bureau. Sapir gathered a volume of Wishram texts, published in 1909, and he managed to achieve a much more sophisticated understanding of the Chinook sound system than Boas. In the summer of 1906 he worked on Takelma and Chasta Costa. Sapir's work on Takelma became his doctoral dissertation, which he defended in 1908. The dissertation foreshadowed several important trends in Sapir's work, particularly the careful attention to the intuition of native speakers regarding sound patterns that later would become the basis for Sapir's formulation of the phoneme.

In 1907–1908 Sapir was offered a position at the University of California at Berkeley, where Boas's first student Alfred Kroeber was the head of a project under the California state survey to document the Indigenous languages of California. Kroeber suggested that Sapir study the nearly extinct Yana language, and Sapir set to work. Sapir worked first with Betty Brown, one of the language's few remaining speakers. Later he began work with Sam Batwi, who spoke another dialect of Yana, but whose knowledge of Yana mythology was an important fount of knowledge. Sapir described the way in which the Yana language distinguishes grammatically and lexically between the speech of men and women.

The collaboration between Kroeber and Sapir was made difficult by the fact that Sapir largely followed his own interest in detailed linguistic description, ignoring the administrative pressures to which Kroeber was subject, among them the need for a speedy completion and a focus on the broader classification issues. In the end Sapir didn't finish the work during the allotted year, and Kroeber was unable to offer him a longer appointment.

Disappointed at not being able to stay at Berkeley, Sapir devoted his best efforts to other work, and did not get around to preparing any of the Yana material for publication until 1910, to Kroeber's deep disappointment.

Sapir ended up leaving California early to take up a fellowship at the University of Pennsylvania, where he taught Ethnology and American Linguistics. At Pennsylvania he worked closely with another student of Boas, Frank Speck, and the two undertook work on Catawba in the summer of 1909. Also in the summer of 1909, Sapir went to Utah with his student J. Alden Mason. Intending originally to work on Hopi, he studied the Southern Paiute language; he decided to work with Tony Tillohash, who proved to be the perfect informant. Tillohash's strong intuition about the sound patterns of his language led Sapir to propose that the phoneme is not just an abstraction existing at the structural level of language, but in fact has psychological reality for speakers.

Tillohash became a good friend of Sapir, and visited him at his home in New York and Philadelphia. Sapir worked with his father to transcribe a number of Southern Paiute songs that Tillohash knew. This fruitful collaboration laid the groundwork for the classical description of the Southern Paiute language published in 1930, and enabled Sapir to produce conclusive evidence linking the Shoshonean languages to the Nahuan languages – establishing the Uto-Aztecan language family. Sapir's description of Southern Paiute is known by linguistics as "a model of analytical excellence".

At Pennsylvania, Sapir was urged to work at a quicker pace than he felt comfortable. His "Grammar of Southern Paiute" was supposed to be published in Boas's Handbook of American Indian Languages, and Boas urged him to complete a preliminary version while funding for the publication remained available, but Sapir did not want to compromise on quality, and in the end the Handbook had to go to press without Sapir's piece. Boas kept working to secure a stable appointment for his student, and by his recommendation Sapir ended up being hired by the Canadian Geological Survey, who wanted him to lead the institutionalization of anthropology in Canada. Sapir, who by then had given up the hope of working at one of the few American research universities, accepted the appointment and moved to Ottawa.

=== In Ottawa ===
In the years 1910–25 Sapir established and directed the Anthropological Division in the Geological Survey of Canada in Ottawa. When he was hired, he was one of the first full-time anthropologists in Canada. He brought his parents with him to Ottawa, and also quickly established his own family, marrying Florence Delson, who also had Lithuanian Jewish roots. Neither the Sapirs nor the Delsons were in favor of the match. The Delsons, who hailed from the prestigious Jewish center of Vilna, considered the Sapirs to be rural upstarts and were less than impressed with Sapir's career in an unpronounceable academic field. Edward and Florence had three children together: Herbert Michael, Helen Ruth, and Philip.

==== Canada's Geological Survey ====
As director of the Anthropological division of the Geological Survey of Canada, Sapir embarked on a project to document the Indigenous cultures and languages of Canada. His first fieldwork took him to Vancouver Island to work on the Nootka language. Apart from Sapir the division had two other staff members, Marius Barbeau and Harlan I. Smith. Sapir insisted that the discipline of linguistics was of integral importance for ethnographic description, arguing that just as nobody would dream of discussing the history of the Catholic Church without knowing Latin or study German folksongs without knowing German, so it made little sense to approach the study of Indigenous folklore without knowledge of the indigenous languages. At this point the only Canadian first nation languages that were well known were Kwakiutl, described by Boas, Tshimshian and Haida. Sapir explicitly used the standard of documentation of European languages to argue that amassing knowledge of indigenous languages was of paramount importance. By introducing the high standards of Boasian anthropology, Sapir incited antagonism from those amateur ethnologists who felt that they had contributed important work. Unsatisfied with efforts by amateur and governmental anthropologists, Sapir worked to introduce an academic program of anthropology at one of the major universities, in order to professionalize the discipline.

Sapir enlisted the assistance of fellow Boasians: Frank Speck, Paul Radin and Alexander Goldenweiser, who with Barbeau worked on the peoples of the Eastern Woodlands: the Ojibwe, the Haudenosaunee, the Huron, and the Wyandot. Sapir initiated work on the Athabascan languages of the Mackenzie valley and the Yukon, but it proved too difficult to find adequate assistance, and he concentrated mainly on Nootka and the languages of the North West Coast.

During his time in Canada, together with Speck, Sapir also acted as an advocate for Indigenous rights, arguing publicly for introduction of better medical care for Indigenous communities, and assisting the Six Nation Haudenosaunee in trying to recover eleven wampum belts that had been stolen from the reservation and were on display in the museum of the University of Pennsylvania. (The belts were finally returned to the Haudenosaunee in 1988.) He also argued for the reversal of a Canadian law prohibiting the Potlatch ceremony of the West Coast tribes.

==== Work with Ishi ====
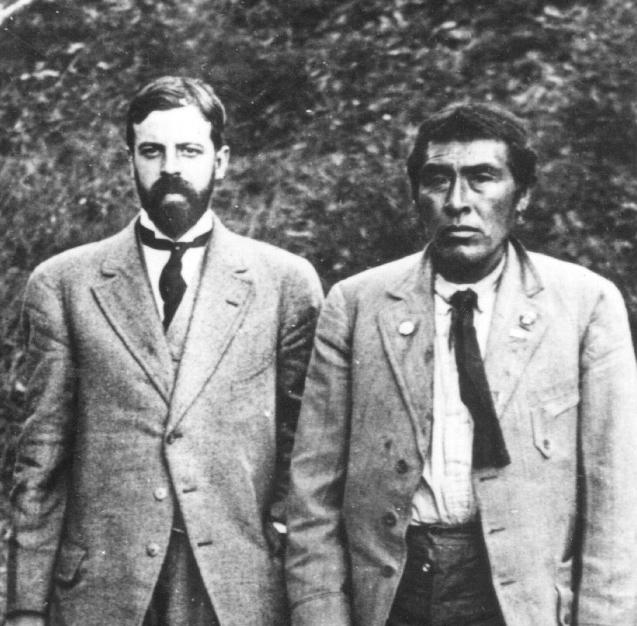
Alfred Kroeber and Ishi

In 1915 Sapir returned to California, where his expertise on the Yana language made him urgently needed. Kroeber had come into contact with Ishi, the last native speaker of the Yahi language, closely related to Yana, and needed someone to document the language urgently. Ishi, who had grown up without contact with European-Americans, was monolingual in Yahi and was the last surviving member of his people. He had been adopted by the Kroebers, but had fallen ill with tuberculosis, and was not expected to live long. Sam Batwi, the speaker of Yana who had worked with Sapir, was unable to understand the Yahi variety, and Krober was convinced that only Sapir would be able to communicate with Ishi. Sapir traveled to San Francisco and worked with Ishi over the summer of 1915, having to invent new methods for working with a monolingual speaker. The information from Ishi was invaluable for understanding the relationships between the different dialects of Yana. Ishi died of his illness in early 1916, and Kroeber partly blamed the exacting nature of working with Sapir for his failure to recover. Sapir described the work: "I think I may safely say that my work with Ishi is by far the most time-consuming and nerve-racking that I have ever undertaken. Ishi's imperturbable good humor alone made the work possible, though it also at times added to my exasperation".

==== Moving on ====
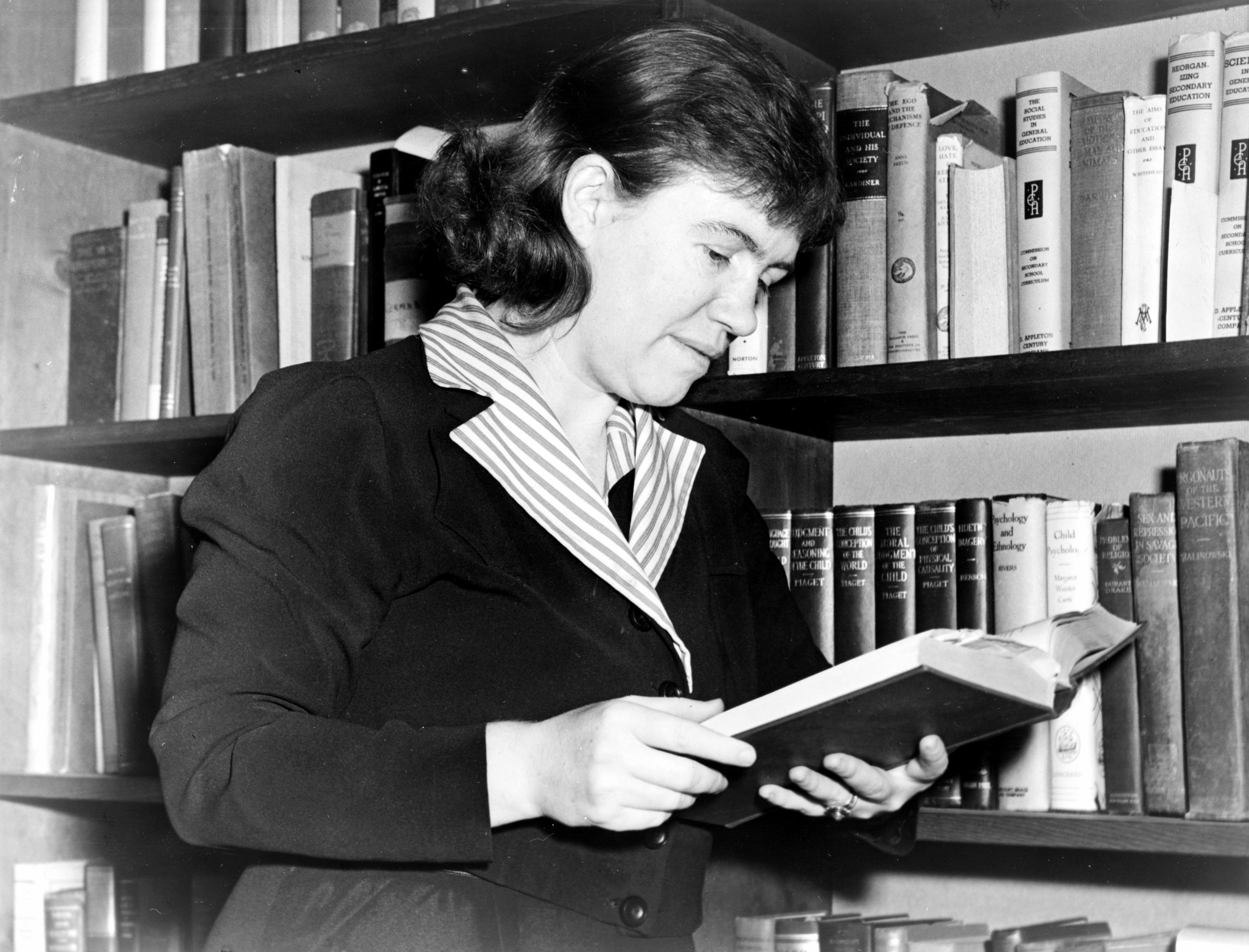
Margaret Mead decades after her affair with Sapir

The First World War took its toll on the Canadian Geological Survey, cutting funding for anthropology and making the academic climate less agreeable. Sapir continued work on Athabascan, working with two speakers of the Alaskan languages Kutchin and Ingalik. Sapir was now more preoccupied with testing hypotheses about historical relationships between the Na-Dene languages than with documenting endangered languages, in effect becoming a theoretician. He was also coming to feel isolated from his American colleagues. From 1912 Florence's health deteriorated due to a lung abscess, and a resulting depression. The Sapir household was largely run by Eva Sapir, who did not get along well with Florence, and this added to the strain on both Florence and Edward. Sapir's parents had by now divorced and his father seemed to develop psychosis, which made it necessary for him to leave Canada for Philadelphia, where Edward continued to support him financially. Florence was hospitalized for long periods both for her depressions and for the lung abscess, and she died in 1924 due to an infection following surgery, providing the final incentive for Sapir to leave Canada. When the University of Chicago offered him a position, he happily accepted.

During his period in Canada, Sapir came into his own as the leading figure in linguistics in North America. Among his substantial publications from this period were his book on Time Perspective in the Aboriginal American Culture (1916), in which he laid out an approach to using historical linguistics to study the prehistory of Native American cultures. Particularly important for establishing him in the field was his seminal book Language: An Introduction to the Study of Speech (1921), which was a layman's introduction to the discipline of linguistics as Sapir envisioned it. He also participated in the formulation of a report to the American Anthropological Association regarding the standardization of orthographic principles for writing Indigenous languages.

While in Ottawa, he also collected and published French Canadian folk songs, and wrote a volume of his own poetry. His interest in poetry led him to form a close friendship with another Boasian anthropologist and poet, Ruth Benedict. Sapir initially wrote to Benedict to commend her for her dissertation on "The Guardian Spirit", but soon realized that Benedict had published poetry pseudonymously. In their correspondence the two critiqued each other's work, both submitting to the same publishers, and both being rejected. They also were both interested in psychology and the relation between individual personalities and cultural patterns, and in their correspondence they frequently psychoanalyzed each other. However, Sapir often showed little understanding for Benedict's private thoughts and feelings, and particularly his conservative gender ideology jarred with Benedict's struggles as a female professional academic. Though they were very close friends for a while, it was ultimately the differences in worldview and personality that led their friendship to fray.

Before departing Canada, Sapir had a short affair with Margaret Mead, Benedict's protégé at Columbia. However, Sapir's conservative ideas about marriage and women's roles were anathema to Mead, as they had been to Benedict, and as Mead left to do field work in Samoa, the two separated permanently. Mead received news of Sapir's remarriage while still in Samoa, and burned their correspondence there on the beach.

=== Chicago years ===
Settling in Chicago reinvigorated Sapir intellectually and personally. He socialized with intellectuals, gave lectures, and participated in poetry and music clubs. His first graduate student at Chicago was Li Fang-Kuei. Sapir also exerted influence through his membership in the Chicago School of Sociology, and his friendship with psychologist Harry Stack Sullivan. The Sapir household continued to be managed largely by Edward's mother Eva, until Sapir remarried in 1926. Sapir's second wife, Jean Victoria McClenaghan, was sixteen years younger than him. She had first met Sapir when she was a student in Ottawa, but had since also come to work at the University of Chicago's department of Juvenile Research. Their son Paul Edward Sapir was born in 1928. Their other son J. David Sapir became a linguist and anthropologist specializing in West African Languages, especially Jola languages.

=== At Yale ===
From 1931 until his death in 1939, Sapir taught at Yale University, where he became the head of the Department of Anthropology. He was invited to Yale to found an interdisciplinary program combining anthropology, linguistics and psychology, aimed at studying "the impact of culture on personality". While Sapir was explicitly given the task of founding a distinct anthropology department, this was not well received by the department of sociology who worked by William Graham Sumner's "evolutionary sociology", which was anathema to Sapir's Boasian approach, nor by the two anthropologists of the Institute for Human Relations, Clark Wissler and G. P. Murdock. Sapir never thrived at Yale, where as one of only four Jewish faculty members (out of 569) he was denied membership to the faculty club where the senior faculty discussed academic business.

At Yale, Sapir's graduate students included Morris Swadesh, Benjamin Lee Whorf, Mary Haas, Charles Hockett, and Harry Hoijer, several of whom he brought with him from Chicago. Sapir came to regard a young Semiticist named Zellig Harris as his intellectual heir, although Harris was never a formal student of Sapir. (For a time he dated Sapir's daughter.) In 1936 Sapir clashed with the Institute for Human Relations over a research proposal of anthropologist Hortense Powdermaker, who proposed a study of the black community of Indianola, Mississippi. Sapir argued that her research should be funded instead of the more sociological work of John Dollard. Sapir eventually lost the discussion and Powdermaker had to leave Yale.

During his tenure at Yale, Sapir was elected to the American Academy of Arts and Sciences, the United States National Academy of Sciences, and the American Philosophical Society.

In the summer of 1937, while teaching at the Linguistic Institute of the Linguistic Society of America in Ann Arbor, Sapir began having problems with a heart condition that had been diagnosed a couple of years earlier. In 1938, he had to take a leave from Yale, during which Benjamin Lee Whorf taught his courses and G. P. Murdock advised some of his students. After Sapir's death in 1939, G. P. Murdock became the chair of the anthropology department. Murdock, who despised the Boasian paradigm of cultural anthropology, dismantled most of Sapir's efforts to integrate anthropology, psychology, and linguistics.

== Anthropological thought ==
Sapir's anthropological thought has been described as isolated within the field of anthropology in his own days. Instead of searching for the ways in which culture influences human behavior, Sapir was interested in understanding how cultural patterns themselves were shaped by the composition of individual personalities that make up a society. This made Sapir cultivate an interest in individual psychology and his view of culture was more psychological than many of his contemporaries. It has been suggested that there is a close relationship between Sapir's literary interests and his anthropological thought. His literary theory saw individual aesthetic sensibilities and creativity interacting with learned cultural traditions to produce unique and new poetic forms, echoing the way that he also saw individuals and cultural patterns as dialectically influencing each other.

== Breadth of languages studied ==
Sapir's special focus among American languages was in the Athabaskan languages, a family which especially fascinated him. In a private letter, he wrote: "Dene is probably the son-of-a-bitchiest language in America to actually know...most fascinating of all languages ever invented." Sapir also studied the languages and cultures of Wishram Chinook, Navajo, Nootka, Colorado River Numic, Takelma, and Yana. His research on Southern Paiute, in collaboration with consultant Tony Tillohash, led to a 1933 article which would become influential in the characterization of the phoneme.

Although noted for his work on American linguistics, Sapir wrote prolifically in linguistics in general. His book Language provides everything from a grammar-typological classification of languages (with examples ranging from Chinese to Nootka) to speculation on the phenomenon of language drift, and the arbitrariness of associations between language, race, and culture. Sapir was also a pioneer in Yiddish studies (his first language) in the United States (cf. Notes on Judeo-German phonology, 1915).

Sapir was active in the international auxiliary language movement. In his paper "The Function of an International Auxiliary Language", he argued for the benefits of a regular grammar and advocated a critical focus on the fundamentals of language, unbiased by the idiosyncrasies of national languages, in the choice of an international auxiliary language.

He was the first Research Director of the International Auxiliary Language Association (IALA), which presented the Interlingua conference in 1951. He directed the Association from 1930 to 1931, and was a member of its Consultative Counsel for Linguistic Research from 1927 to 1938. Sapir consulted with Alice Vanderbilt Morris to develop the research program of IALA.

== Selected publications ==
=== Books ===
- Sapir, Edward (1907). Herder's "Ursprung der Sprache". Chicago: University of Chicago Press. ASIN: B0006CWB2W.
- Sapir, Edward (1908). "On the etymology of Sanskrit asru, Avestan asru, Greek dakru". In Modi, Jivanji Jamshedji (ed.). Spiegel memorial volume. Papers on Iranian subjects written by various scholars in honour of the late Dr. Frederic Spiegel. Bombay: British India Press. pp. 156–159.
- Sapir, Edward; Curtin, Jeremiah (1909). Wishram texts, together with Wasco tales and myths. E.J. Brill. ISBN 978-0-404-58152-7. ASIN: B000855RIW.
- Sapir, Edward (1910). Yana Texts. Berkeley University Press. ISBN 978-1-177-11286-4.
- Sapir, Edward (1915). A sketch of the social organization of the Nass River Indians. Ottawa: Government Printing Office.
- Sapir, Edward (1915). Noun reduplication in Comox, a Salish language of Vancouver island. Ottawa: Government Printing Office.
- Sapir, Edward (1916). Time Perspective in Aboriginal American Culture, A Study in Method. Ottawa: Government Printing Bureau.
- Sapir, Edward (1917). Dreams and Gibes. Boston: The Gorham Press. ISBN 978-0-548-56941-2.
- Sapir, Edward (1921). Language: An introduction to the study of speech. New York: Harcourt, Brace and Company. ISBN 978-4-87187-529-5. ASIN: B000NGWX8I.
- Sapir, Edward; Swadesh, Morris (1939). Nootka Texts: Tales and ethnological narratives, with grammatical notes and lexical materials. Philadelphia: Linguistic Society of America. ISBN 978-0-404-11893-8. ASIN: B000EB54JC.
- Sapir, Edward (1949). Mandelbaum, David (ed.). Selected writings in language, culture and personality. Berkeley: University of California Press. ISBN 978-0-520-01115-1. ASIN: B000PX25CS.
- Sapir, Edward; Irvine, Judith (2002). The psychology of culture: A course of lectures. Berlin: Walter de Gruyter. ISBN 978-3-11-017282-9.

=== Essays and articles ===
- Sapir, Edward (1907). "Preliminary report on the language and mythology of the Upper Chinook". American Anthropologist. 9 (3): 533–544. doi:10.1525/aa.1907.9.3.02a00100.
- Kroeber, Alfred Louis; Waterman, Thomas Talbot; Sapir, Edward; Sparkman, Philip Stedman (January–March 1908). "Notes on California folk-lore". Journal of American Folklore. 21 (80): 35–42. doi:10.2307/534527. hdl:2027/uc1.31822005860226. JSTOR 534527.
- Sapir, Edward (1910). "Some fundamental characteristics of the Ute language". Science. 31 (792): 350–352. doi:10.1126/science.31.792.350. PMID 17738737.
- Sapir, Edward (1911). "Some aspects of Nootka language and culture". American Anthropologist. 13: 15–28. doi:10.1525/aa.1911.13.1.02a00030.
- Sapir, Edward (1911). "The problem of noun incorporation in American languages". American Anthropologist. 13 (2): 250–282. doi:10.1525/aa.1911.13.2.02a00060. S2CID 162838136.
- Sapir, E. (1913). "Southern Paiute and Nahuatl, a study in Uto-Aztekan" (PDF). Journal de la Société des Américanistes. 10 (2): 379–425. doi:10.3406/jsa.1913.2866.
- Sapir, E. (1915). "Abnormal Types of Speech in Nootka" (PDF). Memoir (Geological Survey of Canada). 62. doi:10.4095/103492. hdl:2027/uc1.32106013085003. Archived from the original (PDF) on 2019-08-08.
- Sapir, E. (1915). "Noun Reduplication in Comox, a Salish Language of Vancouver Island" (PDF). Memoir (Geological Survey of Canada). 63. doi:10.4095/103493. hdl:2027/uc2.ark:/13960/t1td9v139. S2CID 126745281. Archived from the original (PDF) on 2019-08-08.
- Sapir, E. (1915). "A Sketch of the Social Organization of the Nass River Indians" (PDF). Museum Bulletin (Geological Survey of Canada). 19. doi:10.4095/104974. hdl:2027/loc.ark:/13960/t0qr4xq6w. S2CID 131590414. Archived from the original (PDF) on 2019-08-08.
- Sapir, Edward (1915). "The Na-dene languages: a preliminary report". American Anthropologist. 17 (3): 765–773. doi:10.1525/aa.1915.17.3.02a00080.
- Sapir, E. (1916). "Time Perspective in Aboriginal American culture: A Study in Method" (PDF). Memoir (Geological Survey of Canada). 90. doi:10.4095/103486. hdl:2027/coo1.ark:/13960/t4xh0677f. Archived from the original (PDF) on 2019-08-08.
- Sapir, Edward (1917). "Do we need a superorganic?". American Anthropologist. 19 (3): 441–447. doi:10.1525/aa.1917.19.3.02a00150.
- Sapir, E. (1923). "Prefatory note" (PDF). Museum Bulletin (Geological Survey of Canada). 37: iii. doi:10.4095/104978. hdl:2027/uc1.31822007179245. Archived from the original (PDF) on 2019-08-08.
- Sapir, Edward (1924). "The grammarian and his language". The American Mercury (1): 149–155.
- Sapir, Edward (1924). "Culture, Genuine and Spurious". The American Journal of Sociology. 29 (4): 401–429. doi:10.1086/213616. S2CID 145455225.
- Sapir, Edward (1925). "Memorandum on the problem of an international auxiliary language". The Romanic Review (16): 244–256.
- Sapir, Edward (1925). "Sound patterns in language". Language. 1 (2): 37–51. doi:10.2307/409004. JSTOR 409004.
- Sapir, Edward (1931). "The function of an international auxiliary language". Romanic Review (11): 4–15. Archived from the original on 2009-10-28.
- Sapir, Edward (1936). "Internal linguistic evidence suggestive of the Northern origin of the Navaho". American Anthropologist. 38 (2): 224–235. doi:10.1525/aa.1936.38.2.02a00040.
- Sapir, Edward (1944). "Grading: a study in semantics". Philosophy of Science. 11 (2): 93–116. doi:10.1086/286828. S2CID 120492809.
- Sapir, Edward (1947). "The relation of American Indian linguistics to general linguistics". Southwestern Journal of Anthropology. 3 (1): 1–4. doi:10.1086/soutjanth.3.1.3628530. S2CID 61608089.

=== Biographies ===
- Koerner, E. F. K.; Koerner, Konrad (1985). Edward Sapir: Appraisals of his life and work. Amsterdam: John Benjamins. ISBN 978-90-272-4518-2.
- Cowan, William; Foster, Michael K.; Koerner, Konrad (1986). New perspectives in language, culture, and personality: Proceedings of the Edward Sapir Centenary Conference (Ottawa, 1–3 October 1984). Amsterdam: John Benjamins. ISBN 978-90-272-4522-9.
- Darnell, Regna (1989). Edward Sapir: linguist, anthropologist, humanist. Berkeley: University of California Press. ISBN 978-0-520-06678-6.
- Sapir, Edward; Bright, William (1992). Southern Paiute and Ute: linguistics and ethnography. Berlin: Walter de Gruyter. ISBN 978-3-11-013543-5.
- Sapir, Edward; Darnell, Regna; Irvine, Judith T.; Handler, Richard (1999). The collected works of Edward Sapir: culture. Berlin: Walter de Gruyter. ISBN 978-3-11-012639-6.

=== Correspondence ===
- Sapir, Edward; Kroeber, Alfred L.; Golla (ed.), Victor (1984). "The Sapir–Kroeber correspondence: Letters between Edward Sapir and A.L. Kroeber 1905–1925" (PDF). Reports from the Survey of California and Other Indian Languages. 6: 1–509.
