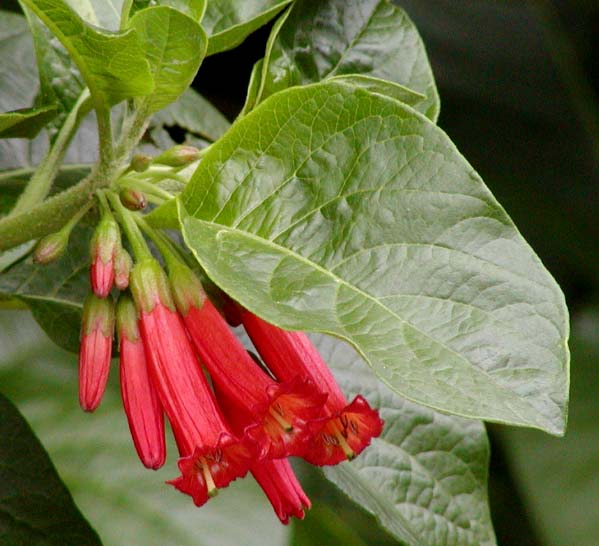
- Iochroma fuchsioides

Scientific classification
- Kingdom: Plantae
- Clade: Tracheophytes
- Clade: Angiosperms
- Clade: Eudicots
- Clade: Asterids
- Order: Solanales
- Family: Solanaceae
- Subfamily: Solanoideae
- Tribe: Physaleae
- Genus: Iochroma; Benth.

Species
- See text.

Synonyms
- Acnistus Schott; Chaenesthes Miers; Cleochroma Miers; Codochonia Dunal; Diplukion Raf.; Ephaiola Raf.; Eplateia Raf.; Pederlea Raf.; Valteta Raf.

= Iochroma =

Genus of shrubs

Iochroma is a genus of about 34 species of shrubs and small trees belonging to the nightshade family Solanaceae. Species are native from Mexico to south Brazil. They are found in the forests of Mexico and South America. Their hummingbird-pollinated flowers are tubular or trumpet-shaped, and may be blue, purple, red, yellow, or white, becoming pulpy berries. The cupular (cup-shaped) calyx is inflated in some species. The leaves are alternate, simple, and entire.

Iochromas are cultivated as flowering ornamentals and in cooler zones (zones 7–8/9) make useful patio shrubs for summer display or conservatory plants. The majority are not frost-hardy and must be overwintered under protection. In warmer zones (zones 9–10) they can be used as landscape plants. They are commonly trained as standards (topiary) to control their size and shape. Iochroma flowers attract hummingbirds (Americas only) and bees to gardens.

Like many plants in the Solanaceae, Iochroma species contain phytochemicals with potential pharmaceutical value but the genus has not been exhaustively studied in this respect. Iochroma fuchsioides is taken by the medicine men of the Kamsa Indians of the Sibundoy valley in the Colombian Andes for difficult diagnoses, the unpleasant side effects lasting several days. A variety of withanolides and hydroxycinnamic acid amides have been isolated from Iochroma species.

== Taxonomy ==
The genus Iochroma was established by George Bentham in 1845. Like other plant families, the Solanaceae is further divided into subfamilies, tribes and subtribes. Iochroma is in the subtribe Iochrominae along with the genera Dunalia, Eriolarynx, Saracha and Vassobia. As of February 2023, Acnistus, previously treated as a separate genus, was regarded as a synonym of Iochroma.

=== Species ===
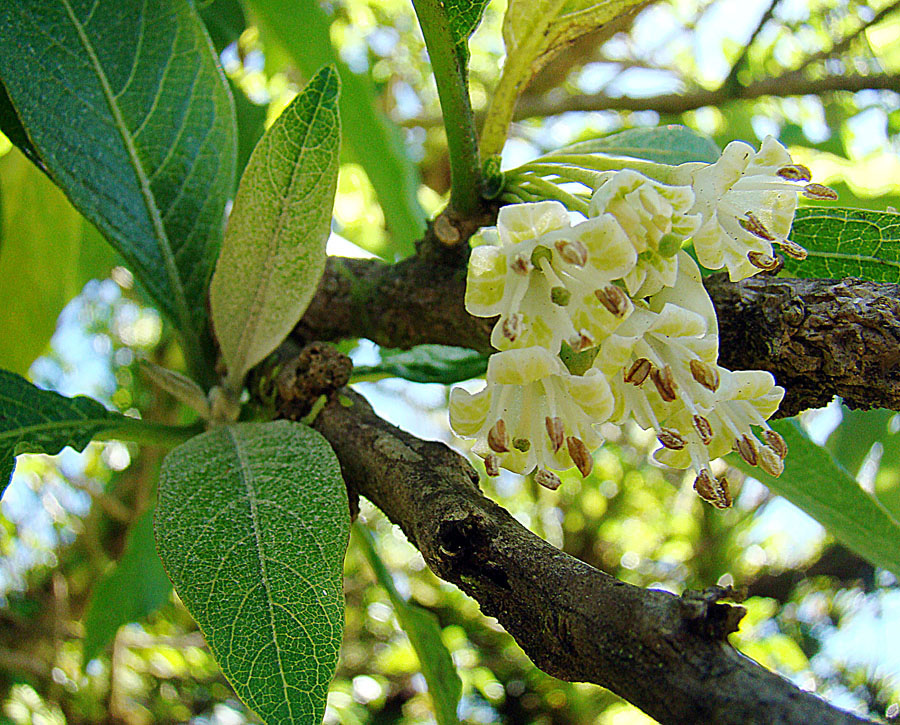
Iochroma arborescens

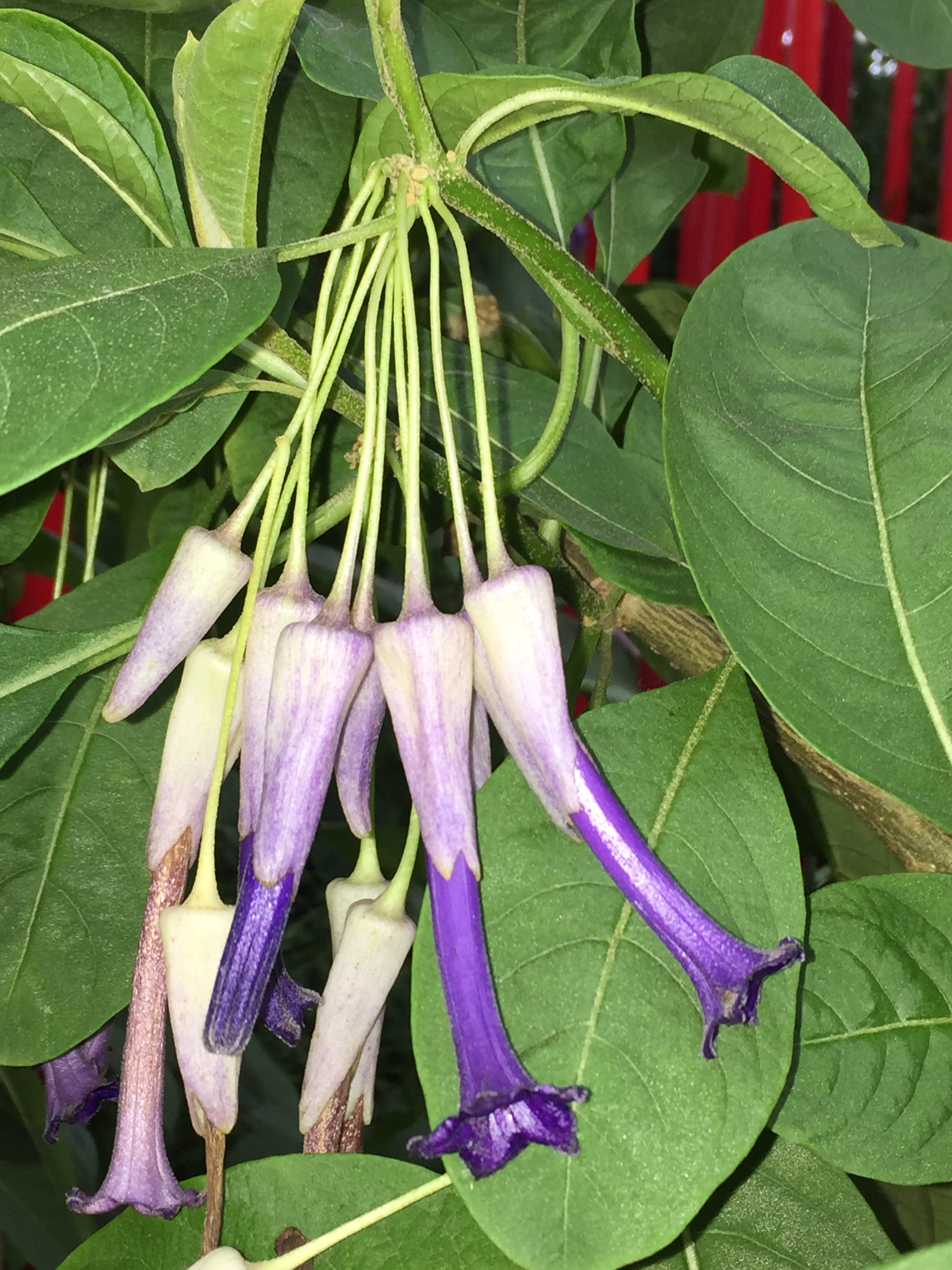
The Ecuadorian species Iochroma calycinum, syn. I. macrocalyx, Temperate House, Kew Gardens

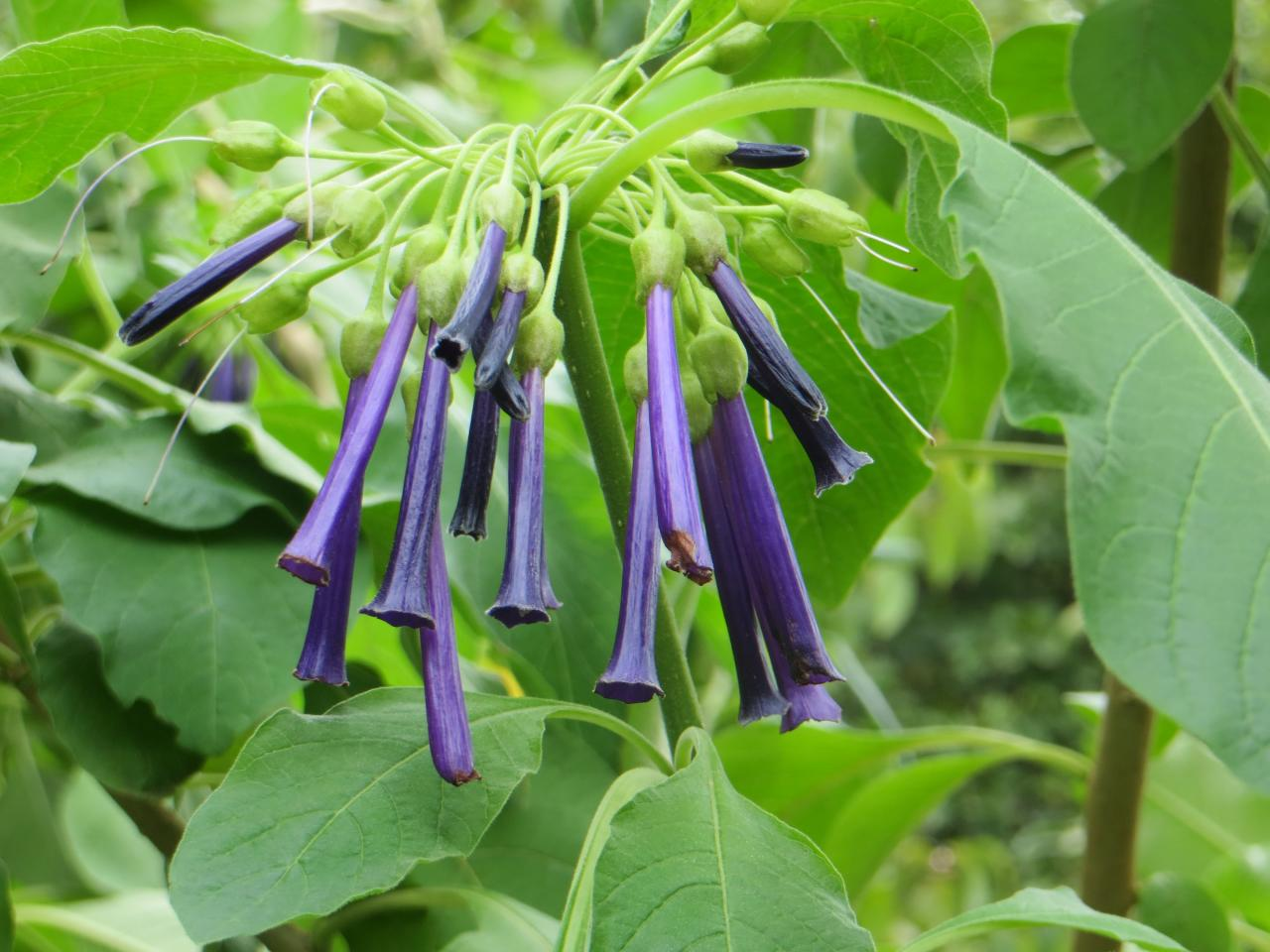
Iochroma cyaneum Quinta do Palheiro Ferreiro, Funchal, Madeira.

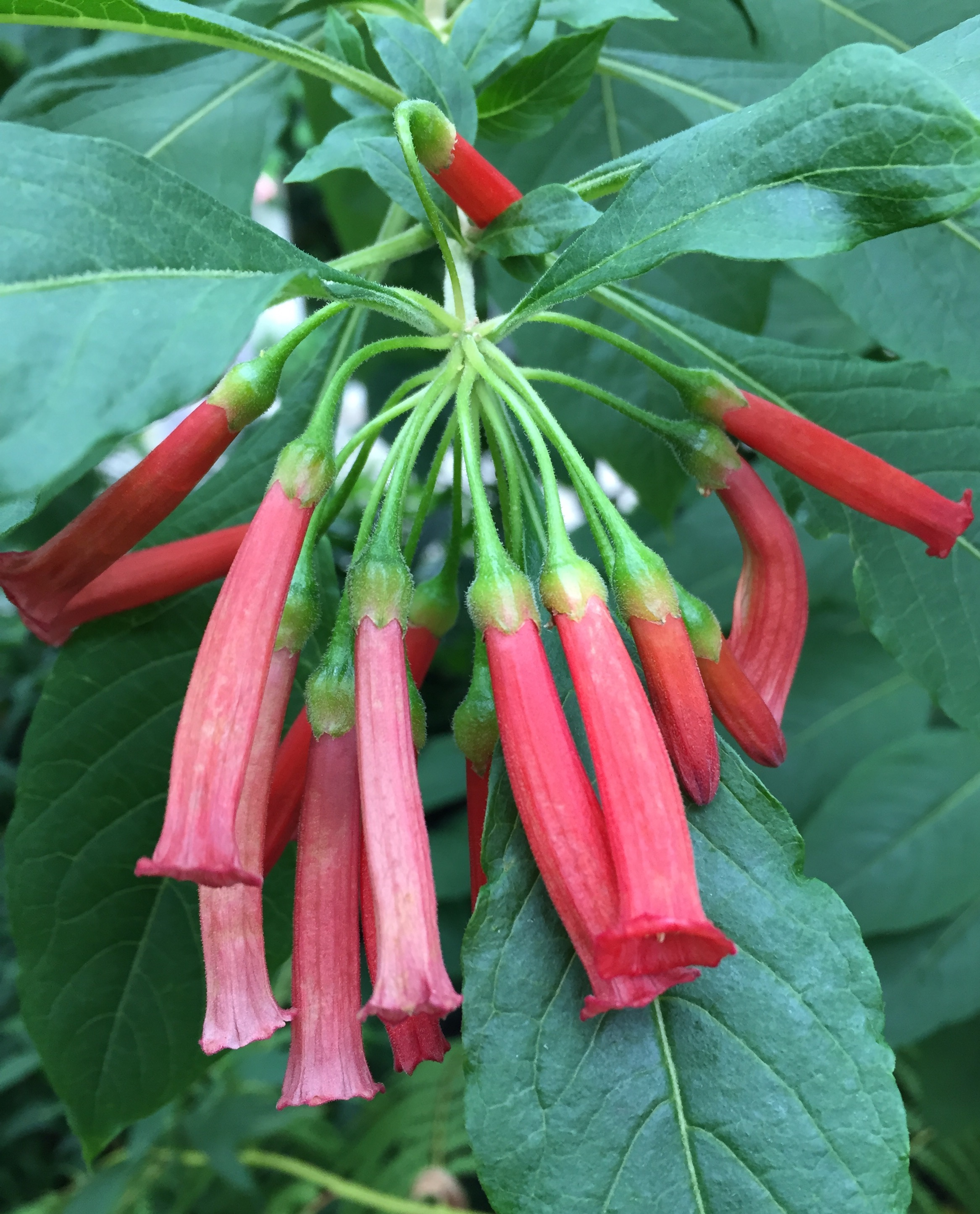
The unresolved Mexican species Iochroma coccinea growing in the Temperate House at Kew Gardens

The genus is currently divided into three sections. As of February 2023, Plants of the World Online accepts the following species:

Section Iochroma

- Iochroma albianthum S.Leiva
- Iochroma ayabacense S.Leiva
- Iochroma calycinum Benth.
- Iochroma confertiflorum (Miers) Hunz.
- Iochroma cornifolium (Kunth) Miers
- Iochroma cyaneum (Lindl.) M.L.Green
- Iochroma edule S.Leiva
- Iochroma fuchsioides (Bonpl.) Miers
- Iochroma gesnerioides (Kunth) Miers
- Iochroma loxense Miers
- Iochroma nitidum S.Leiva & Quip.
- Iochroma peruvianum (Dunal) J.F.Macbr.
- Iochroma piuranum S.Leiva
- Iochroma salpoanum S.Leiva & Lezama
- Iochroma schjellerupii S.Leiva & Quip.
- Iochroma squamosum S.Leiva & Quip.
- Iochroma stenanthum S.Leiva, Quip. & N.W.Sawyer
- Iochroma tingoanum S.Leiva
- Iochroma tupayachianum S.Leiva

Section Lehmannia

- Iochroma ellipticum (Hook.f.) Hunz.
- Iochroma lehmannii Bitter

Section Spinosa

- Iochroma parvifolium (Roem. & Schult.) D'Arcy

Unclassified

- Iochroma amicorum M.A.Cueva, S.D.Sm. & S.Leiva
- Iochroma arborescens (L.) J.M.H.Shaw
- Iochroma barbozae S.Leiva & Deanna
- Iochroma baumii S.D.Sm. & S.Leiva
- Iochroma brevistamineum Dammer
- Iochroma cachicadanum S.Leiva
- Iochroma lilacinum S.Leiva & K.Lezama
- Iochroma longipes Miers
- Iochroma lyciifolium Dammer
- Iochroma mionei S.Leiva & S.D.Sm.
- Iochroma ortizianthum S.Leiva & Deanna
- Iochroma richardianthum S.Leiva
- Iochroma rubicalyx S.Leiva & Jara
- Iochroma smithianum K.Lezama, Limo & S.Leiva
- Iochroma solanifolium Dammer
- Iochroma viridescens S.Leiva
- Iochroma warscewiczii Regel

=== Former species ===
Species formerly placed in the genus Iochroma include:

- Iochroma australe Griseb. (Bolivia, Argentina) → Eriolarynx australis
- Iochroma cardenasianum Hunz. → Trompettia cardenasiana
- Iochroma grandiflorum Benth. → Trozelia grandiflora
- Iochroma umbellatum (Ruiz & Pav.) Hunz. → Trozelia umbellata

== Cultivation ==
Several forms of Iochroma (some wild collected, some garden hybrids) have been given cultivar names. Some of the cultivars have been assigned to species but others, mainly hybrids, have not. There may be some synonymy in this list.

- Iochroma calycinum 'Vlasta's Surprise'
- Iochroma cyaneum 'Album'
- Iochroma cyaneum 'Apricot Belle'
- Iochroma cyaneum 'Indigo'
- Iochroma cyaneum 'Karl Hartweg'
- Iochroma cyaneum 'John Miers'
- Iochroma cyaneum 'Royal Blue'
- Iochroma cyaneum 'Royal Queen' = I. cyaneum 'Indigo'
- Iochroma cyaneum 'Sky King'
- Iochroma cyaneum 'Trebah'
- Iochroma cyaneum 'Woodcote White'
- Iochroma gesnerioides 'Coccineum'
- Iochroma gesnerioides var. flavum
- Iochroma 'Ashcott Red'
- Iochroma 'Burgundy Bells'
- Iochroma 'Frosty Plum'
- Iochroma 'Ilie's Plum'
- Iochroma 'Plum Beauty'
- Iochroma 'Plum Delight'
- Iochroma 'Purple Haze'
- Iochroma 'Ruby Red' (I. cyaneum 'Royal Blue' x I. 'Sunset')
- Iochroma 'Sunset'
- Iochroma 'Wine Red'
