= Hugo Jamioy Juagibioy =

Colombian poet and storyteller (born 1971)

- Born: Hugo Jesús Jamioy Juagibioy; 1971; Waman Tabanók, Colombia
- Occupation: Poet
- Writing career
- Genre: poetry

Hugo Jesús Jamioy Juagibioy (born 1971) is a Colombian poet and storyteller. He is an indigenous person from Colombia, who belongs to the Kamëntsa people.

== Background ==
Jamioy was born in Waman Tabanók (which translated to "Our sacred place of origin"), located in the Valley of Sibundoy, Putumayo Department.

== Education ==
Jamioy has studied Agronomic Engineering at the University of Caldas.

== Career ==
The Colombian Ministry of Culture awarded Jamioy a National Research Grant in 2006. In 2013, he participated in the Smithsonian Institution's Folklife Festival in Washington, D.C.

== Published works ==
- Mi fuego y mi humo, mi tierra y mi sol (1999). Infección Editores, Facultad de Derecho Ciencias Jurídicas y Sociales, Dirección de Bienestar Universitario, Universidad Nacional de Colombia, Bogotá.
- No somos gente (2000) edition from the author. 2000.
- Bínÿbe Oboyejuayëng. Danzantes del Viento (2010). Bogotá: Ministerio de Cultura.

== See also ==
- List of writers from peoples indigenous to the Americas
- Camsá language
