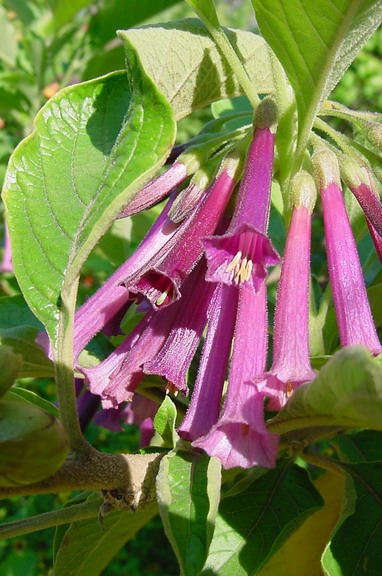

Scientific classification
- Kingdom: Plantae
- Clade: Tracheophytes
- Clade: Angiosperms
- Clade: Eudicots
- Clade: Asterids
- Order: Solanales
- Family: Solanaceae
- Genus: Iochroma
- Species: I. grandiflorum

Binomial name
- Iochroma grandiflorum Benth.

= Iochroma grandiflorum =

Species of flowering plant

Iochroma grandiflorum is an Iochroma species found in Ecuador. It was first described in 1845
