= Iochroma longipes =

Conservation status
- Critically Endangered (IUCN 3.1)

Scientific classification
- Kingdom: Plantae
- Clade: Tracheophytes
- Clade: Angiosperms
- Clade: Eudicots
- Clade: Asterids
- Order: Solanales
- Family: Solanaceae
- Genus: Iochroma
- Species: I. longipes

Binomial name
- Iochroma longipes Miers

Synonyms
- Heterotypic Synonyms: Chaenesthes longipes Dunal

Species of flowering plant

Iochroma longipes is a species of flowering plants in the family Solanaceae. It is endemic to Ecuador.
