= Kamëntšá people =

Indigenous people of Colombia

Kamëntšá
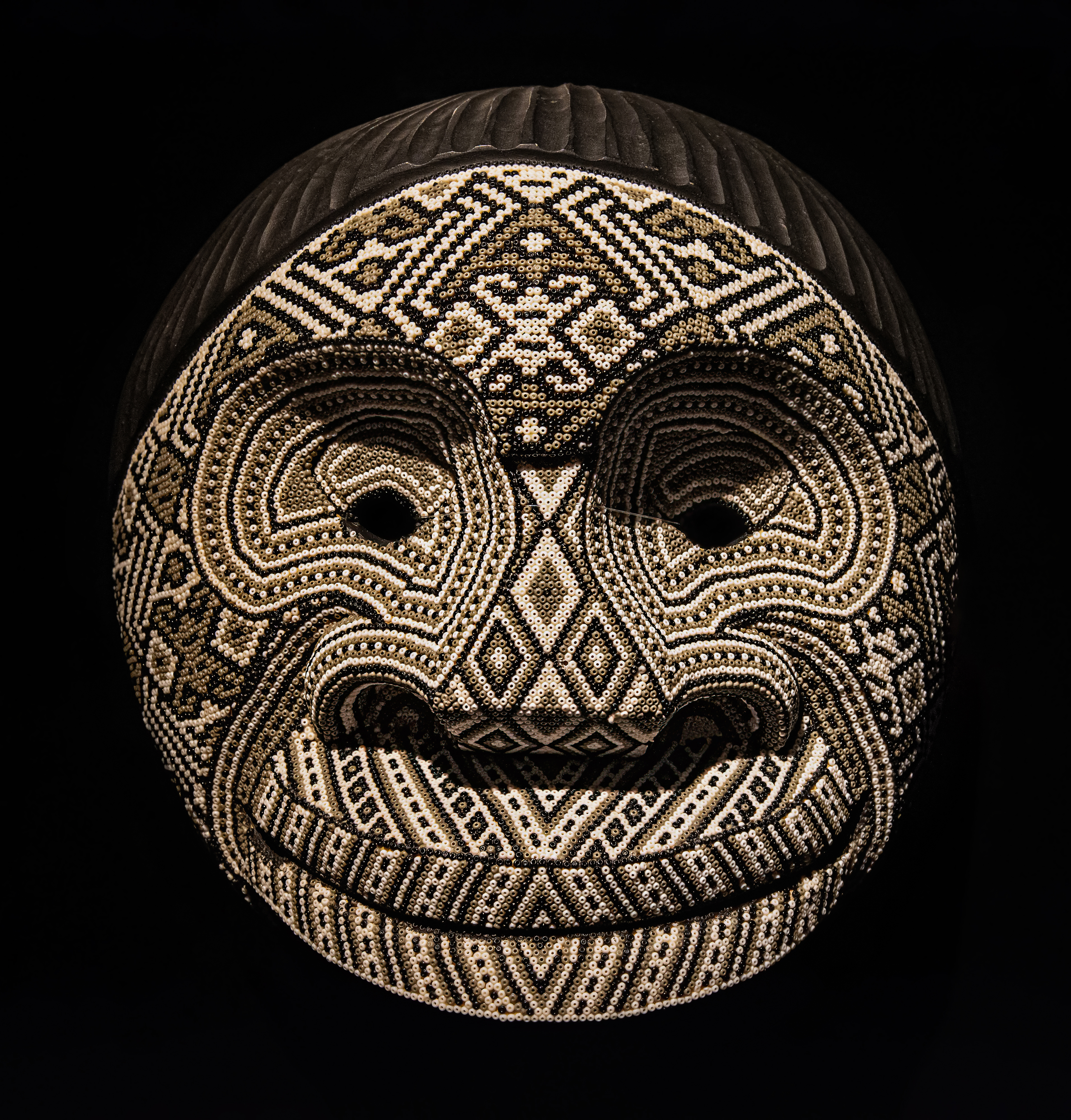
- Kamëntšá ceremonial mask with Chaquira-style beadwork

Total population
- 7,521 (2018)

Regions with significant populations
- Colombia

Languages
- Camsá, Inga, Spanish

Religion
- Indigenous religion (Shamanism), Roman Catholicism (syncretized)

Related ethnic groups
- Inga people

The Kamëntšá people (/kɑːmənʃɑː/) are an Indigenous people in Colombia. They primarily live in the Sibundoy Valley of the Putumayo Department in the south of Colombia.

== Name ==
The name is rendered variously as Kamëntšá, Camsá, Camëntsëá, Coche, Kamemtxa, Kamsa, Kamse, Sibundoy, and Sibundoy-Gaché.

== Language ==
The Kamëntšá language is a language isolate, although linguists have tried to connect it to the Chibchan language family in the past. The language is written in the Latin script.

== Culture ==
Kamëntšá people are known for their carved wooden masks that are worn during ceremonies and festivals.

They farm maize, beans, potatoes, and peas, and use several different entheogens, including ayahuasca (yagé), Brugmansia species, Iochroma fuchsioides and Desfontainia in their rituals. Kamëntšá shamans are noted for the number and variety of Brugmansia cultivars which they have propagated in their gardens of entheogenic plants, and which bear leaves in a wide variety of curiously misshapen forms. One of these cultivars - 'Culebra' ('snake' in Spanish) proved so aberrant that it was, for a time, actually removed from Brugmansia and accorded monotypic genus status as "Methysticodendron" (Greek : "intoxicating tree"), the full Linnaean binomial of the plant becoming Methysticodendron amesianum before it was subsumed once more in Brugmansia.

== Gallery ==
=== Kamëntšá People ===
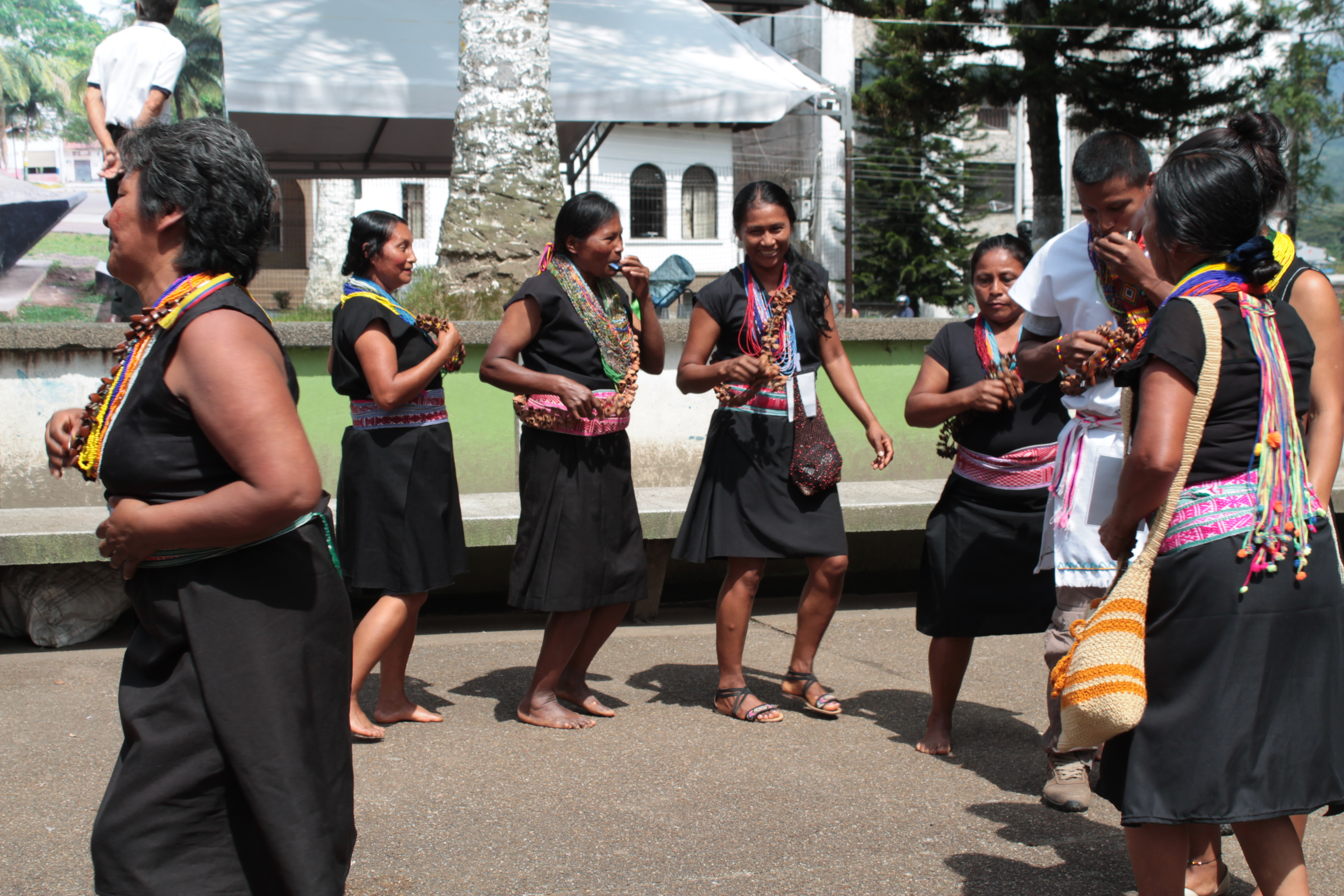
Kamëntšá dancers

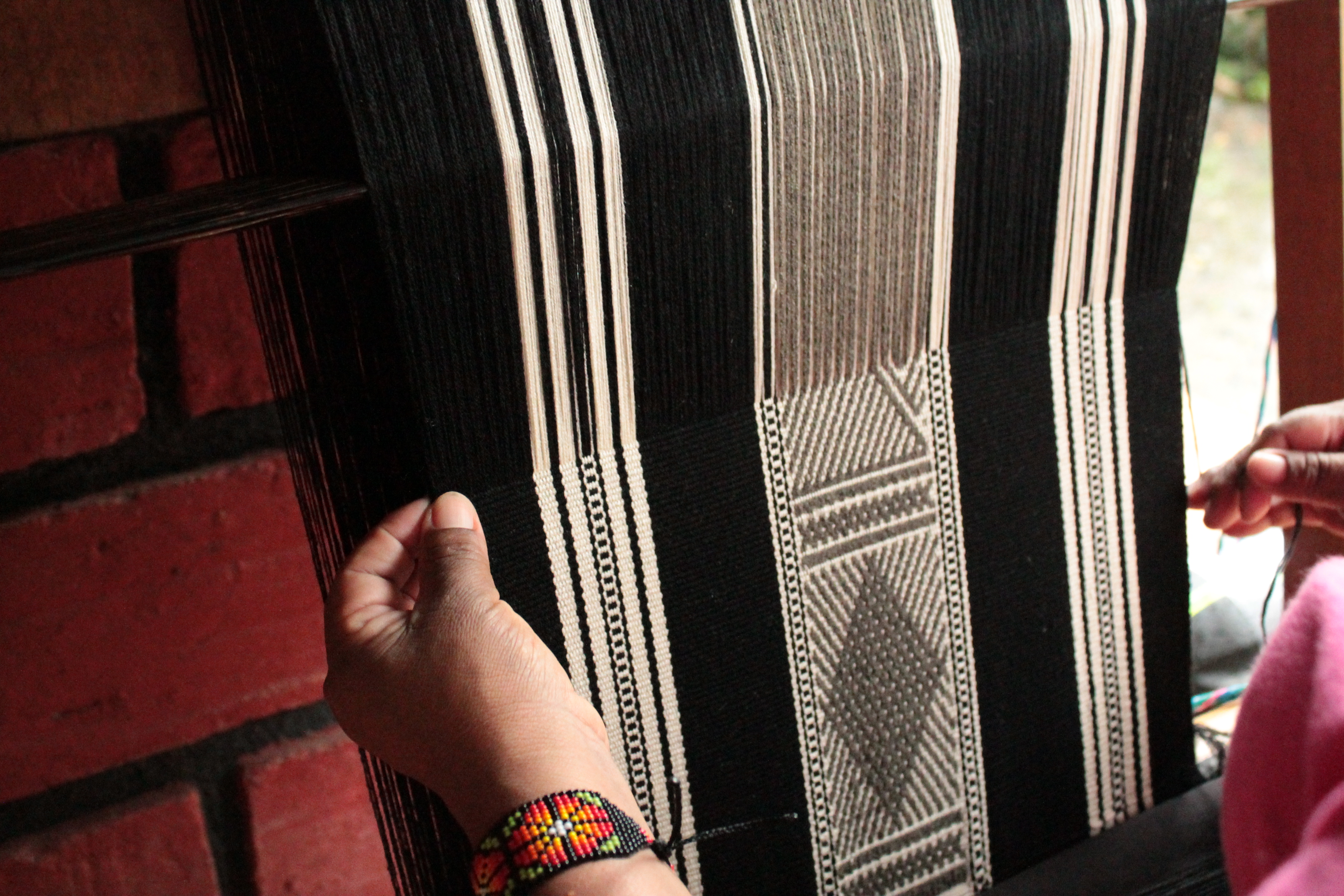
Weaver creating traditional textile on a loom

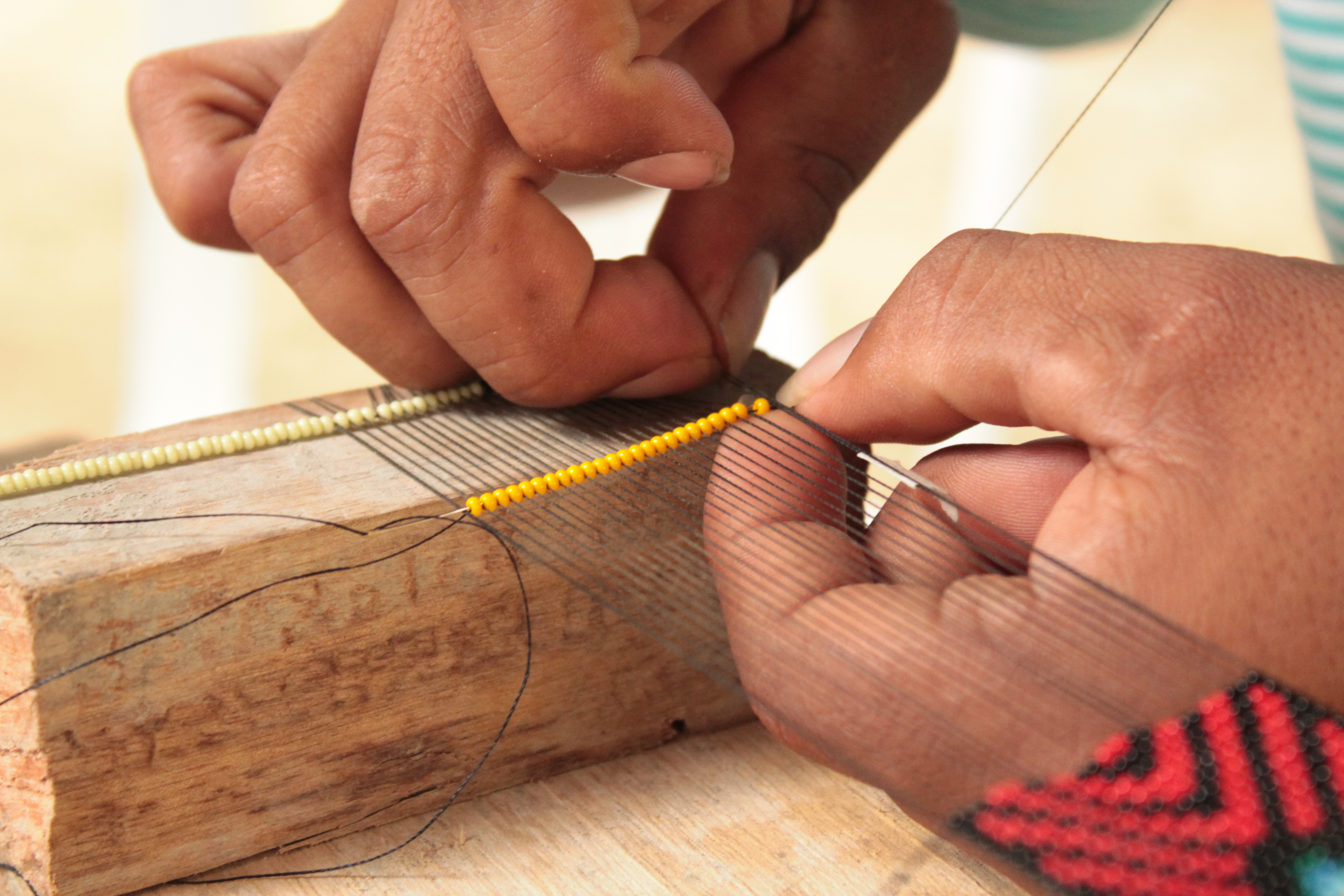
Craftsperson threading traditional beadwork

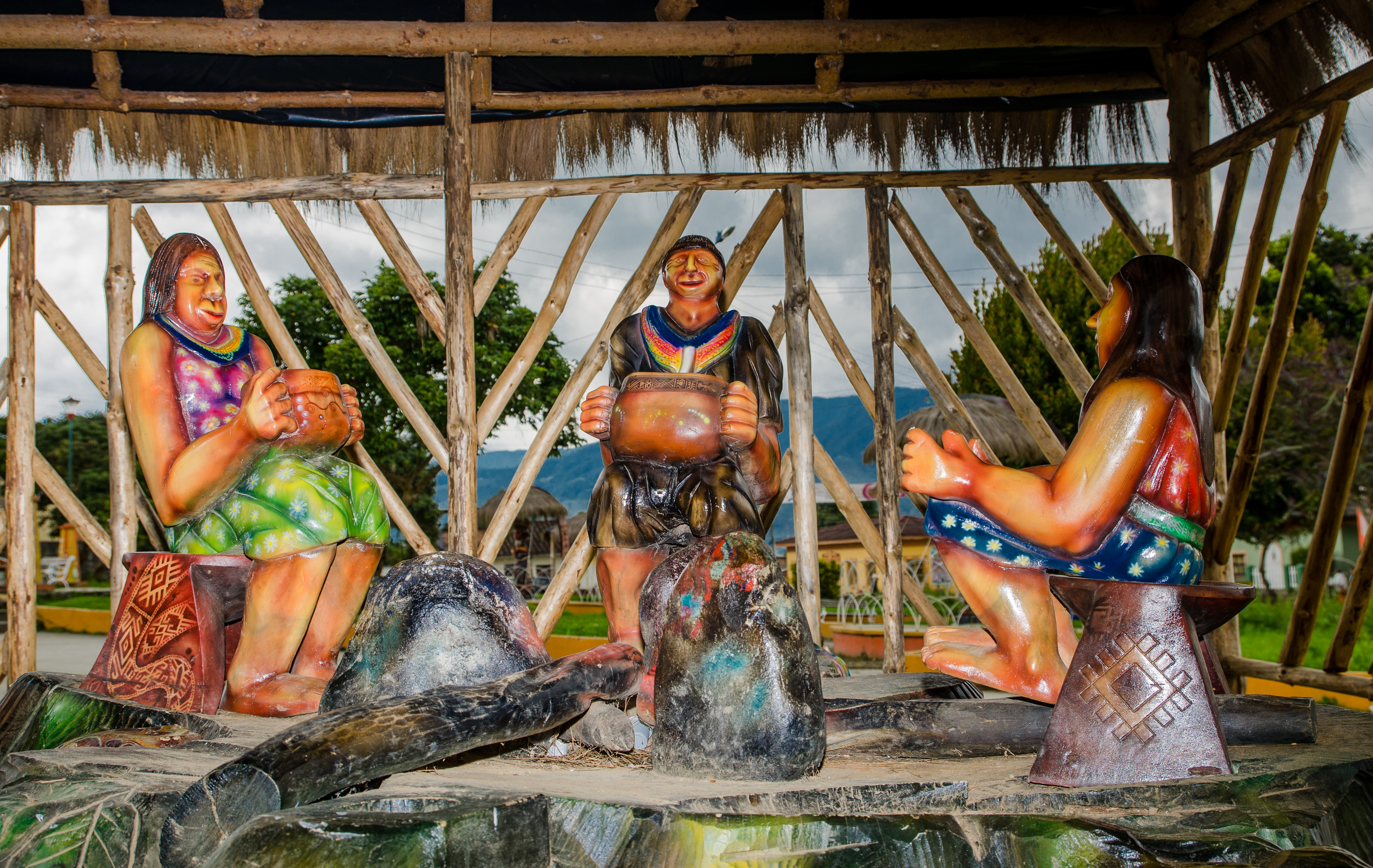
Woodcarving of Kamëntšá in traditional costume in the Parque de Sibundoy

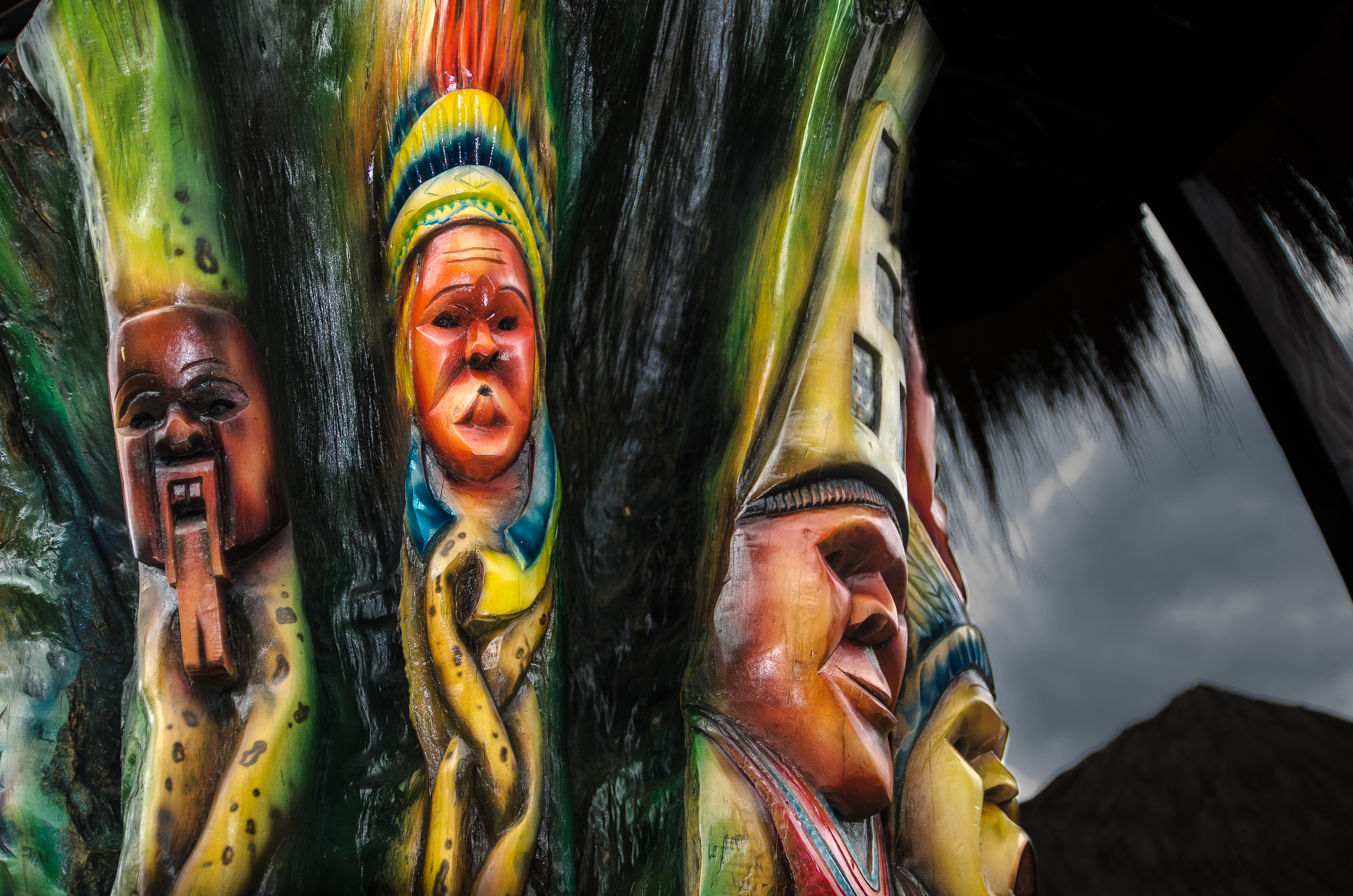
Woodcarving of Kamëntšá mythological beings, Parque de Sibundoy

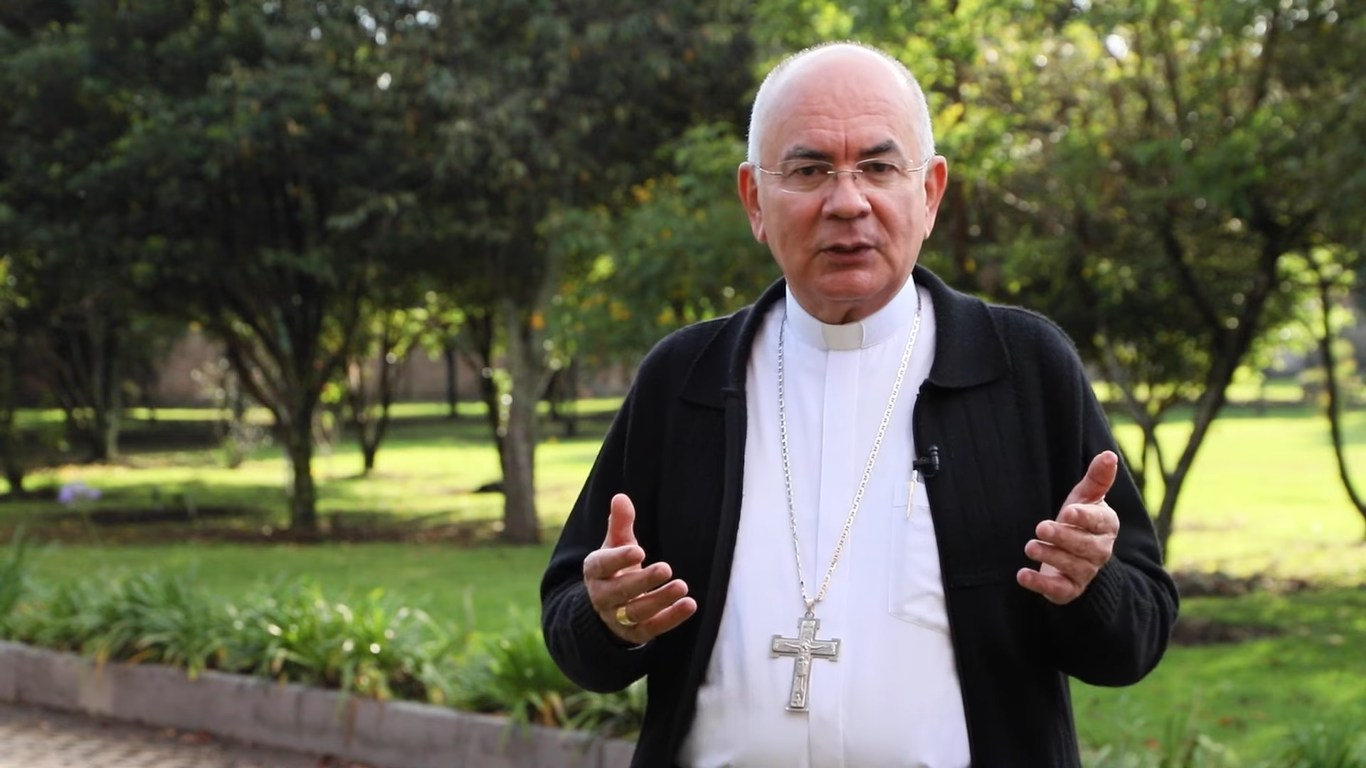
Luis Albeiro Maldonado Monsalve, bishop of Sibundoy

=== Entheogenic plants of the Kamëntšá ===
During the long period of relative isolation, a great variety of curious cultivated plants were brought into the [Sibundoy] Valley. Some are of scant importance today and may never have enjoyed a wide appreciation among the Valley’s inhabitants. Others, the predominant food, medicinal and narcotic plants, have come to assume very great importance in the economic and social life of the natives.
Certain plants, known nowhere else, have evolved in the Valley under the influences of cultivation. Such has come to pass with the Tree Datura [=Brugmansia] drugs.

Melvin L. Bristol 1969

Debasement of Sibundoy Indian culture is a sad and logical result of national development and is a model for the erosion of traditional life throughout South America. Not long ago, the Valley of Sibundoy had some of the most interesting uses of psychoactive and medicinal plants in the world. Today, alcoholism is replacing the ceremonial use of safer drugs.

Andrew Weil 1980

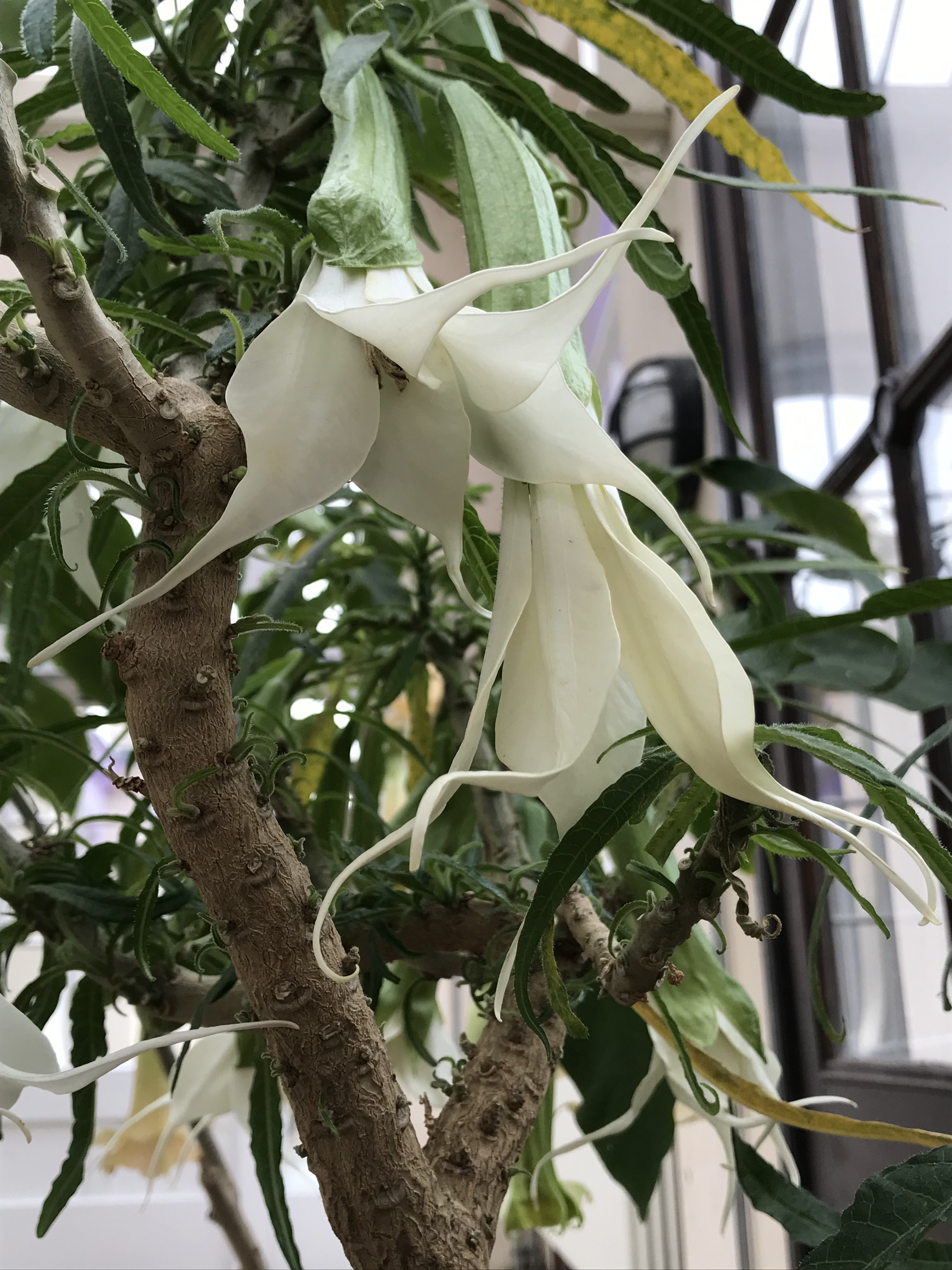
Brugmansia × candida var. 'Culebra', Kew Gardens

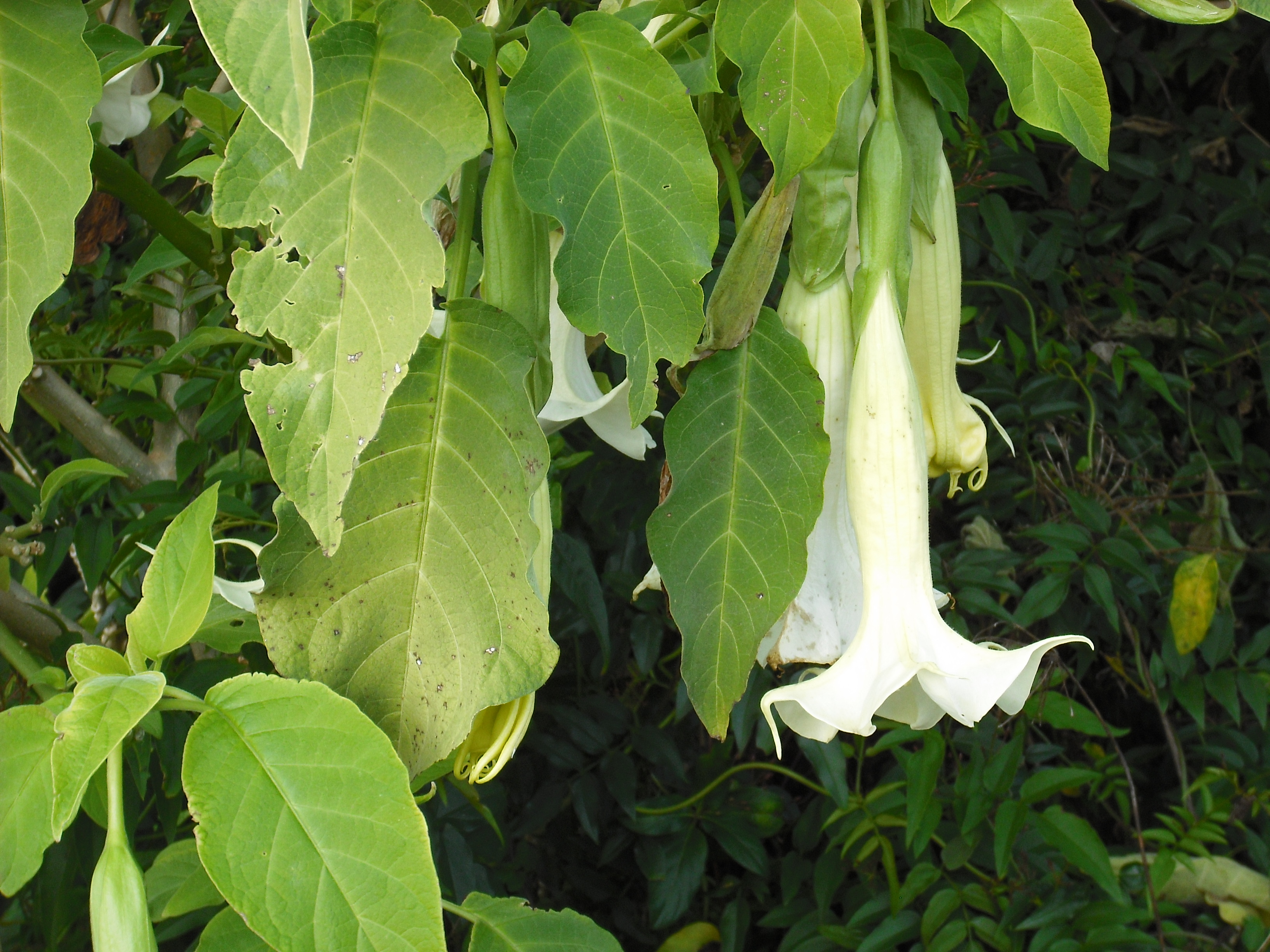
Conventional form of Brugmansia × candida

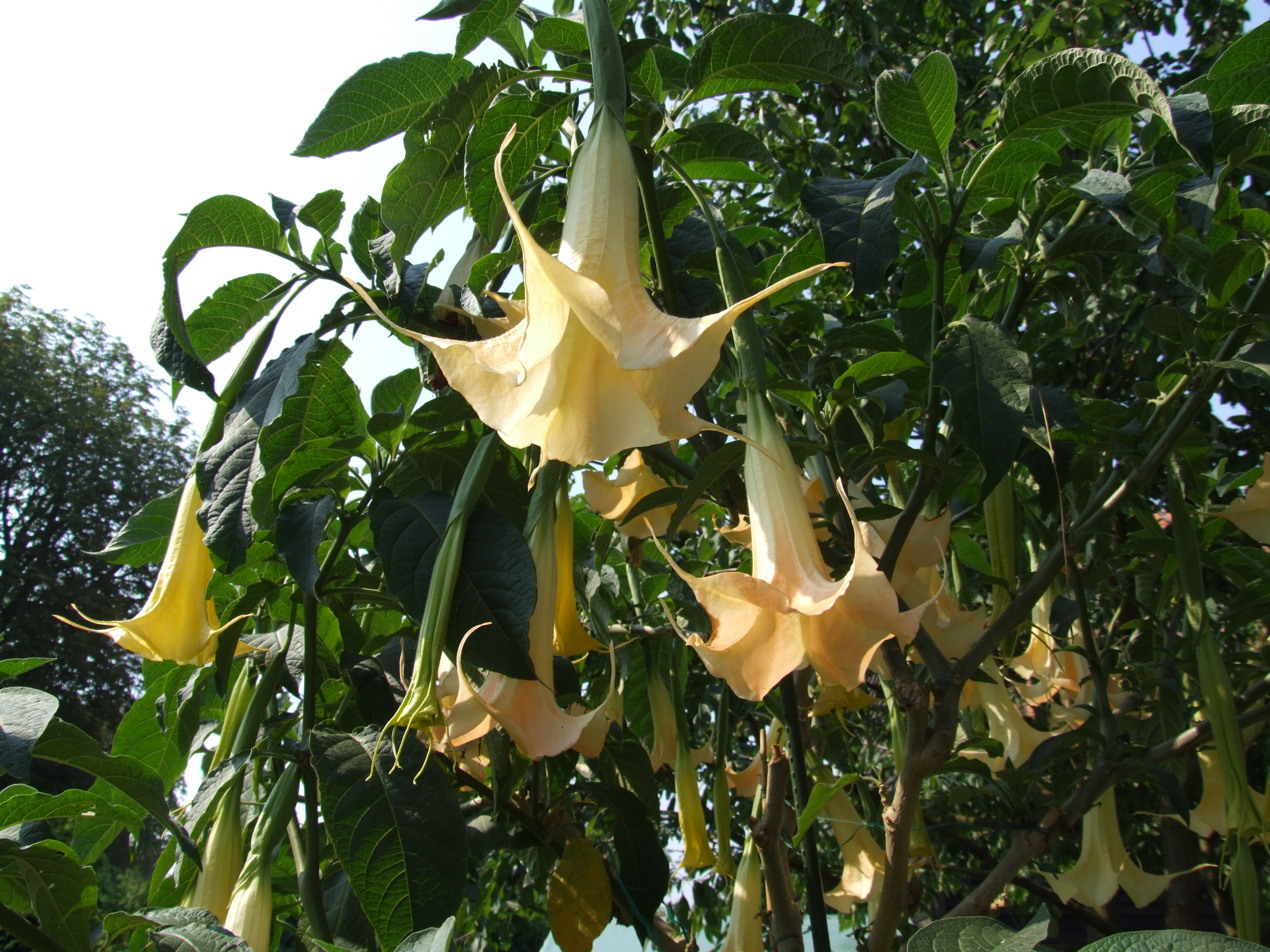
Conventional form of Brugmansia aurea

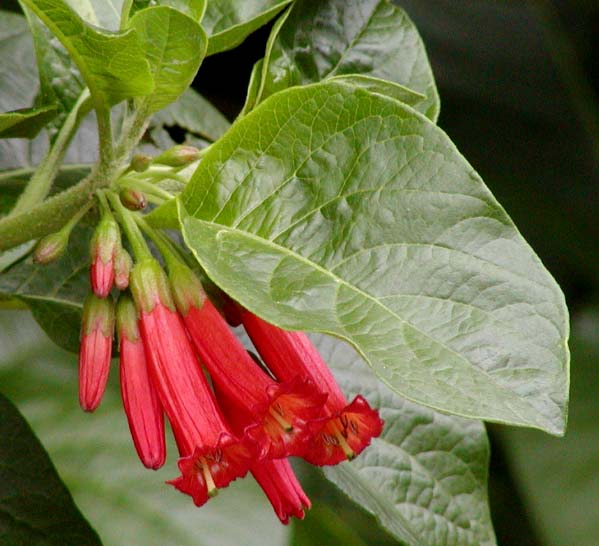
Iochroma fuchsioides, San Francisco Botanical Garden

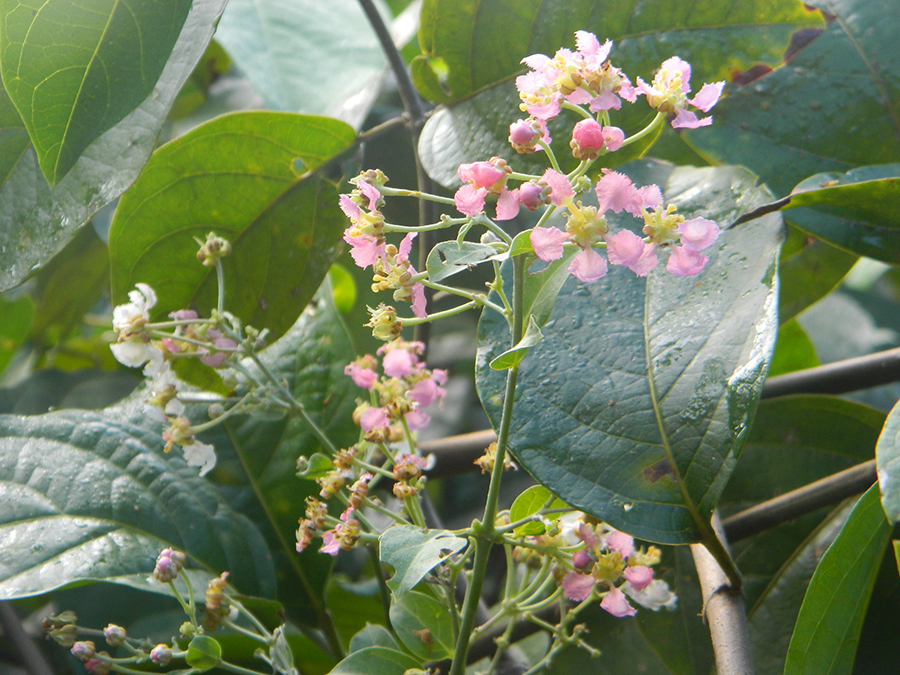
Banisteriopsis caapi, principal ingredient of ayahuasca

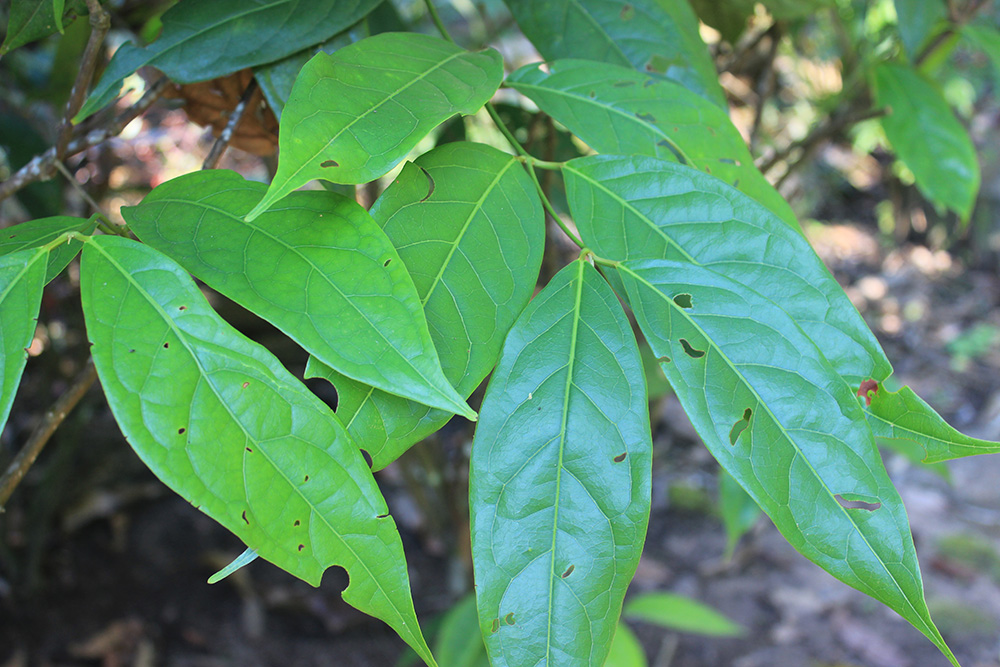
Diplopterys cabrerana: jointly the most important ayahuasca additive

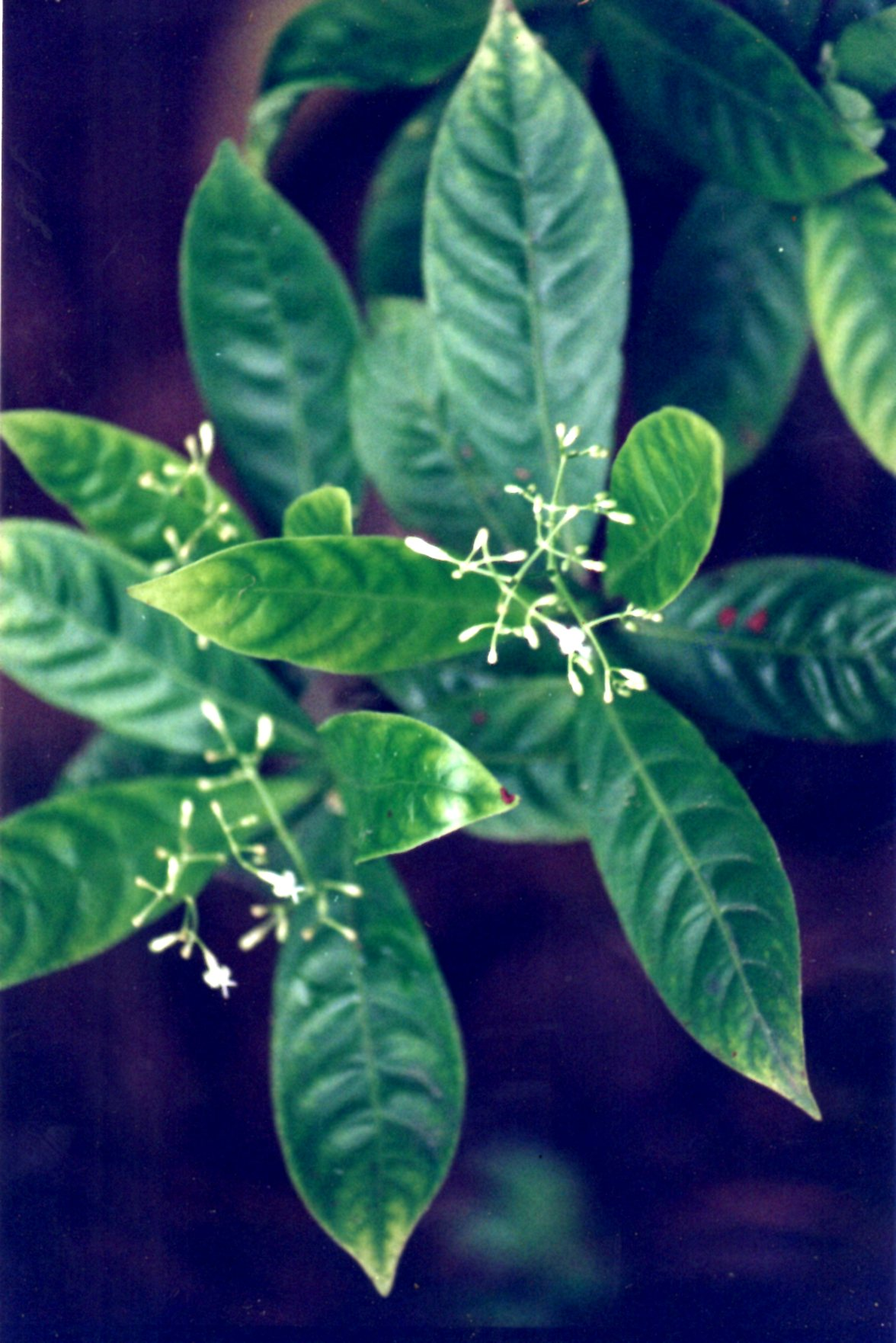
Psychotria viridis: jointly the most important ayahuasca additive

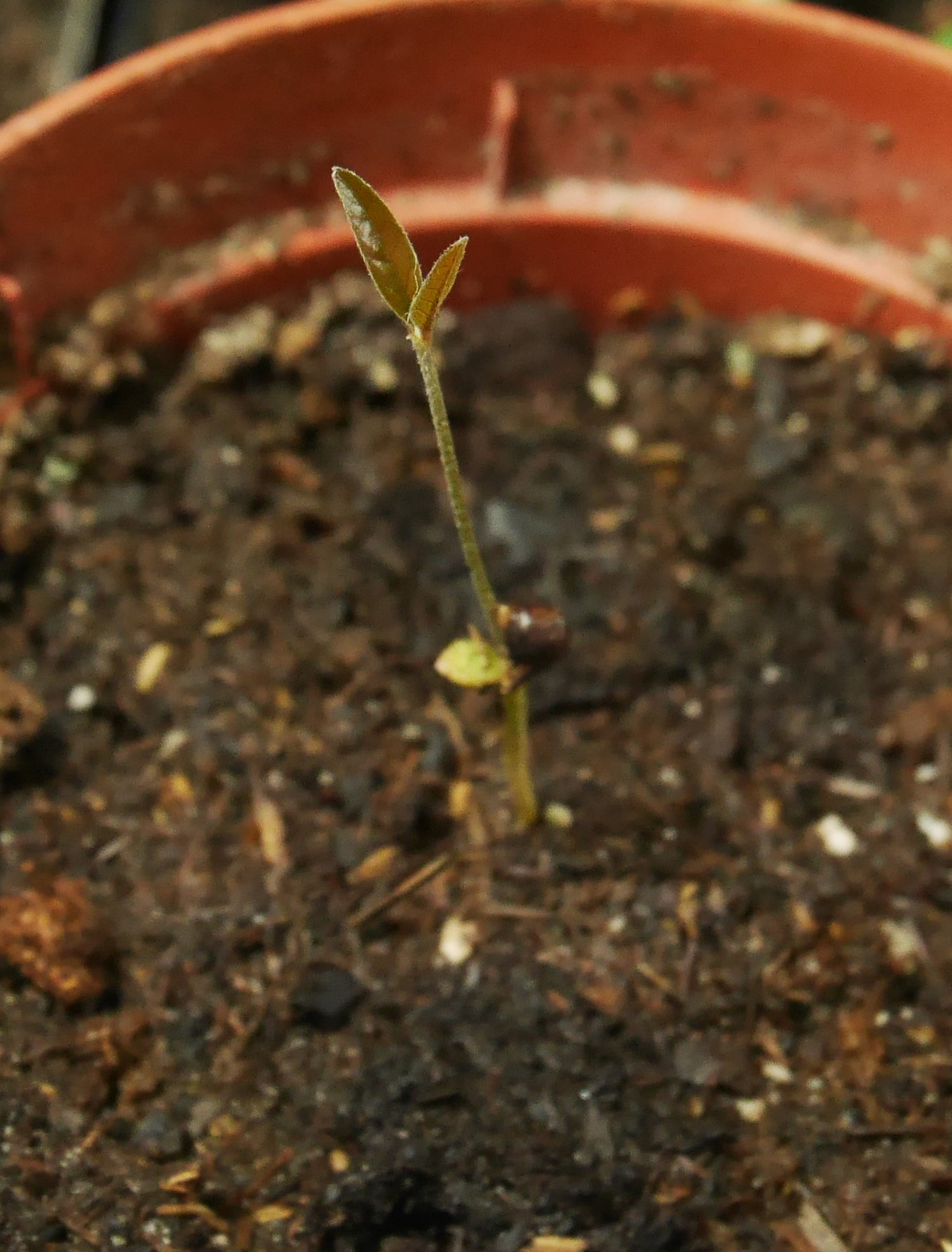
Seedling of Glicophyllum stylopterum (formerly known as (i.a.) Tetrapterys methystica)

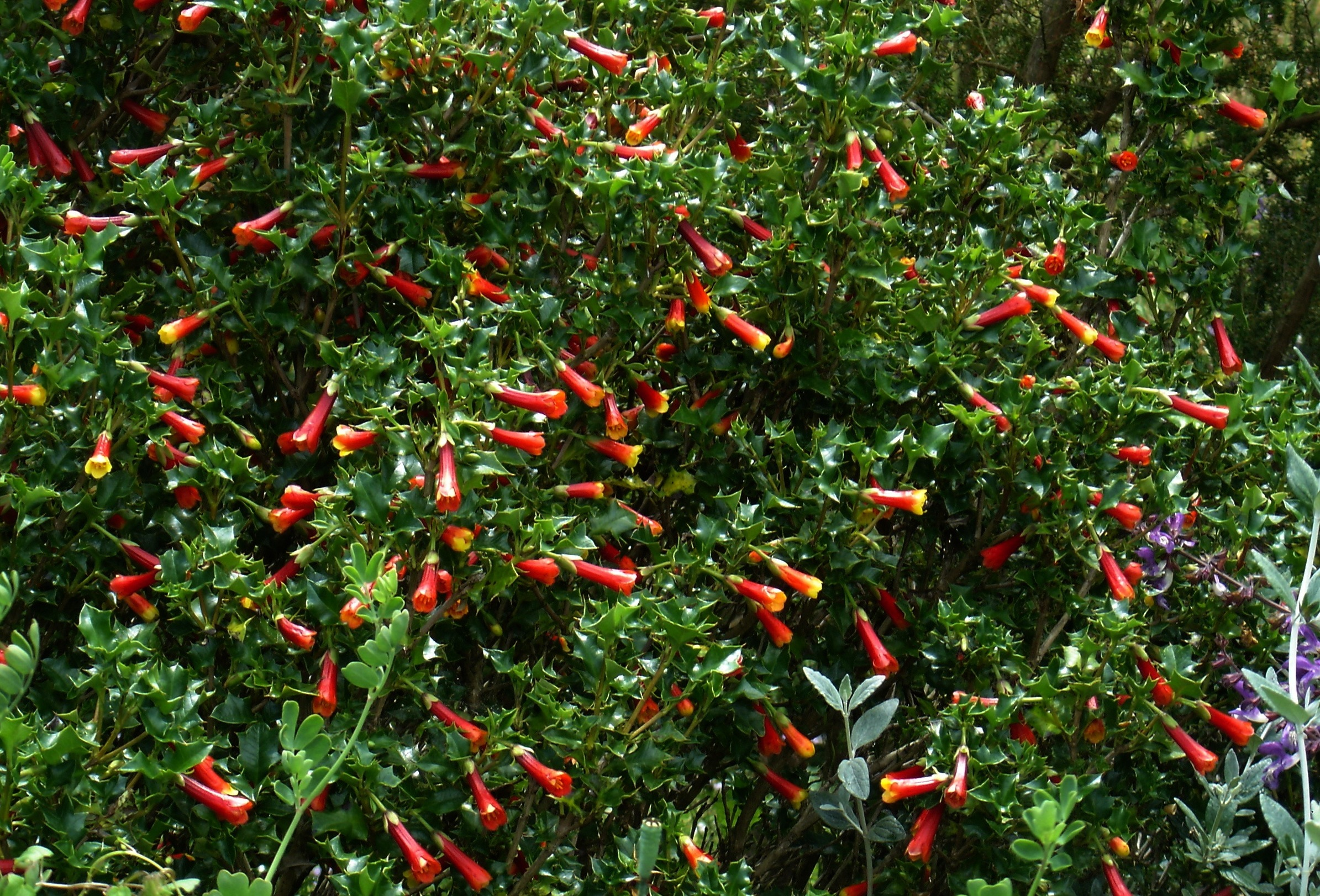
Desfontainia spinosa: ‘borrachera del paramo’

== Notable Kamëntšá people ==
- Hugo Jamioy Juagibioy, poet and Indigenous rights activist
