= Iochroma lehmannii =

Conservation status
- Endangered (IUCN 3.1)

Scientific classification
- Kingdom: Plantae
- Clade: Tracheophytes
- Clade: Angiosperms
- Clade: Eudicots
- Clade: Asterids
- Order: Solanales
- Family: Solanaceae
- Genus: Iochroma
- Species: I. lehmannii

Binomial name
- Iochroma lehmannii Dammer ex Bitter

Species of flowering plant

Iochroma lehmannii is a species of plant in the family Solanaceae. It is endemic to Ecuador, specifically in the Chimborazo Province in the High Andes. Its flowers are yellow-green.
