= Iochroma brevistamineum =

Conservation status
- Data Deficient (IUCN 3.1)

Scientific classification
- Kingdom: Plantae
- Clade: Embryophytes
- Clade: Tracheophytes
- Clade: Spermatophytes
- Clade: Angiosperms
- Clade: Eudicots
- Clade: Asterids
- Order: Solanales
- Family: Solanaceae
- Genus: Iochroma
- Species: I. brevistamineum

Binomial name
- Iochroma brevistamineum Dammer

Species of flowering plant

Iochroma brevistamineum is a species of plant in the family Solanaceae. It is endemic to Ecuador.
