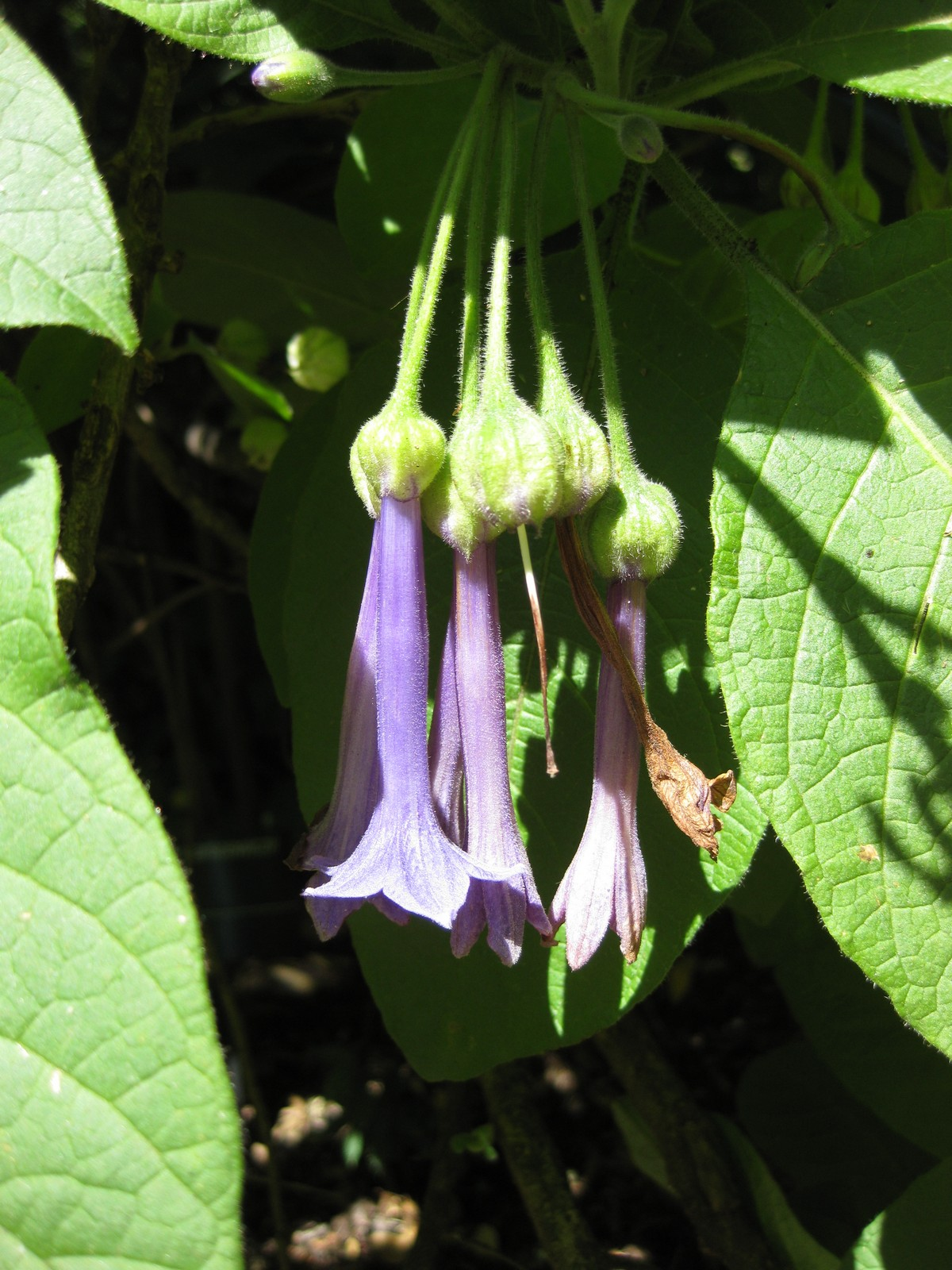

Scientific classification
- Kingdom: Plantae
- Clade: Tracheophytes
- Clade: Angiosperms
- Clade: Eudicots
- Clade: Asterids
- Order: Solanales
- Family: Solanaceae
- Genus: Iochroma
- Species: I. warscewiczii

Binomial name
- Iochroma warscewiczii Regel

= Iochroma warscewiczii =

Species of plant

Iochroma warscewiczii is a shrub in the family Solanaceae. The species, which is native to Peru, was formally described in 1855 by German botanist Eduard August von Regel. It is named for the Polish botanist and explorer Józef Warszewicz Ritter von Rawicz (1812-1866).
