= Kamëntšá language =

Indigenous language of the Kamëntšá people of Colombia

Kamëntšá
- Camsá, Sibundoy
- Kamintšá
- Pronunciation: /kamɨnʈ͡ʂa/
- Native to: Colombia
- Region: Putumayo Department
- Ethnicity: Kamëntšá people
- Native speakers: 4,000 (2008)
- Language family: Language isolate
- Early form: Quillasinga?

Language codes
- ISO 639-3: kbh
- Glottolog: cams1241
- ELP: Camsá
- Linguasphere: 81-OAA-aa
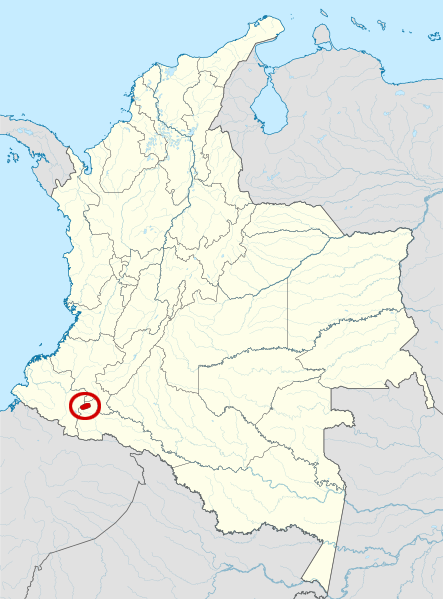
- Location of the Kamëntšá language speakers.

Kamëntšá, commonly rendered Camsá or Sibundoy in old sources, is a language isolate and native language of the Kamëntšá people who primarily inhabit the Sibundoy Valley of the Putumayo Department in the south of Colombia.

== Classification ==
Kamëntšá appears to be a language isolate. Researchers have tried connecting it to the Chibchan languages without success. Fabre reports that the Kamëntšá are descended, at least in part, from the Quillasinga, whose language is unattested.

== Language contact ==
Jolkesky notes that there are lexical similarities with the Choco languages due to contact.

== Varieties ==
Mason lists the following names as Coche (Mocoa) varieties.

- Sebondoy
- Quillacinga
- Patoco

== Phonology ==
=== Consonants ===
Consonants
		Bilabial	Alveolar	Retroflex	Palatal	Velar
Stop	voiceless	p (Note: Only in loanwords)	t			k
Stop	voiced	b	d			g
Stop	prenasal		ⁿd			ᵑg
Affricate	voiceless		t͡s	ʈ͡ʂ	t͡ʃ	
Affricate	prenasal				ⁿdʒ	
Fricative	voiceless	ɸ	s	ʂ	ʃ	x
Fricative	voiced				ʒ	
Trill			r			
Nasal		m	n		ɲ	
Lateral			l		ʎ	
Approximant					j	w

Howard and O'Brien call the retroflex phonemes in the above table retroflex, while Huber & Reed use the alveolo-palatal symbols. More specifically, Howard uses ⟨tṣ⟩ and ⟨ṣ⟩, O'Brien uses ⟨tʂ⟩ and ⟨ʂ⟩, and Huber & Reed use ⟨tɕ⟩ and ⟨ɕ⟩.

=== Vowels ===
Huber & Reed, Howard, and O'Brien all analyze six vowel phonemes in Kamëntšá: /a/, /e/, /i/, /o/, /u/, and /ɨ/. O'Brien notes that /ɨ/ has a limited distribution and is rarely found at the beginnings of words, and that [i] in many cases may be an allophone of /e/ before palatal consonants. Howard found that /i/ and /e/ fluctuate in some morphemes, as do /u/ and /o/.

Vowels
	Front	Central	Back
Close	i	ɨ	u
Mid	e		o
Open		a	

== Grammar ==
Kamëntšá is a polysynthetic language with prefixes and suffixes. It also has dual number, which is unusual for languages around it.

== Vocabulary ==
Huber & Reed's book provides a comparison between 68 indigenous languages of Colombia. The following table provides the order of words in the book, along with glosses in English and Spanish. The Kamëntšá words follow their orthography, i.e., using ⟨tɕ⟩ and ⟨ɕ⟩ instead of ⟨ʈʂ⟩ and ⟨ʂ⟩.

no.	English gloss	Spanish gloss	Camsá	notes
001	tongue	lengua	bitʃtá-xa	
002	mouth	boca	wajá-ɕa	
003	lip	labio	wajatsebiá-ɕa	
004	tooth	diente	xuatsá-ɕe	
005	nose	nariz	tsxá-ɕe	
006	eye	ojo	bɕnɨ-bé	
007	ear	oreja	matskuá-ɕe	
008	head	cabeza	bestɕá-ɕe, betɕá-ɕe	
009	forehead	frente	xuentsɨɕá-ɕe	
010	hair	cabello	stxɨnɨ́-xa	
011	chin	mentón	kumbambɨ́-ɕa	
012	beard	barba	wangɨtsboboʃɨ́-xua	
013	neck	cuello	tamoɕá-xa	
014	chest	pecho	kotʃá-xa	
015	woman’s breast	teta, seno, pechos	tʃótʃo	
016	abdomen	vientre, abdomen	wabsbiá	
017	back	espalda	stɨtɕá-xa	
018	shoulder	hombro	tantɕá-xa	
019	arm	brazo	buakuá-tɕe	
021	elbow	codo	ʃɨmia-bé	
022	hand	mano	kukuá-tɕe	
023	finger	dedo de la mano	ntɕabuá-bxa	
024	fingernail	una	ngétsebia-ɕe	
025	leg	pierna	mɨntxá-xa	
027	knee	rodilla	ntsamiá-ɕe	
028	shin	espinilla	ɕɨbxá-xa	
029	foot	pie	ʃekuá-tɕe	
030	toe	dedo del pie	xɨntɕá-bxa	
031	skin	piel	bobátʃe	
032	bone	hueso	betá-ɕe, betá-bxa	
033	blood	sangre	buíɲe	
034	heart	corazón	ainána	
035	lungs	pulmones	béxnatse	
036	penis	pene	lótɕe	
037	vulva	vulva	salápo	
038	man	hombre	entɕá (jentɕá)	
039	male	varón	bojabása	
040	woman	mujer	ʃembása	
041	people	gente	entɕánga	
042	husband	marido, esposo	bojá	
043	wife	marida, esposa	ʃéma	
044	father	padre	taitá, bébta	
045	mother	madre	mamá, bebmá, máma	
046	baby, infant	criatura	ɕeɕóna, (ɕoɕóna)	
047	old man	viejo	bɨtsanań	
048	water	agua	bújeʃe, béxa-je	
049	river	río	béxa-ke, bʃáxa-je	
051	lake	lago	wabxaxóna-je	
052	swamp	pantano	xatɨʃáɲe	
053	spring of water	fuente, ojo de agua	obaxtʃkaníɲe	
054	waterfall	caída de agua	buatʃkɨkxaníɲe	
055	rapids	catarata, raudal	bʃawenaníɲe	
056	flame, fire	candela, fuego	íɲe, níɲe	
057	ash	ceniza	xatinjá	
058	charcoal	carbón	enaxomá-ɕe	
059	smoke	humo	ngóna	
060	firewood	leña	niɲá	
061	sky	cíelo	sel-óka	Spanish loanword
062	rain	lluvia	wabténa	
063	wind	viento	bínjia	
064	sun	sol	ʃínje	
065	moon	luna	xuaʃkóna	
066	star	estrella	estrelja-téma	Spanish loanword
067	day	día	bɨnɨ-té, té	
068	night	noche	ibéta	
069	thunder	trueno	waxuesajá	
070	lightning	relámpago	tkuínje	
071	rainbow	arco iris	tsɨbkuákuatxo	
072	earth, soil	tierra	bʃántse	
073	stone	piedra	ndɨtɕ-bé	
074	sand	arena	kaskáxo	Spanish loanword
075	house	casa	jébna	
076	roof	techo	thɨxnaɲe, bonxanána	
077	door	puerta	bɨɕá-ɕe	
078	seat, stool	banco	tɕenɨ́-ɕe	
079	mat	estera	txuá-ʃe	
080	hammock	hamaca	uxonjanɨ́-ʃa	
081	bed	catre, cama de barbacoa	xutsnɨ́-ʃa	
082	cooking pot	olla	matbá-xa	
083	cultivated clearing	roza, sementera	xaxáɲe	
084	village	caserío	pueblo-téma	Spanish loanword
085	path, trail	camino, sendero, trocha	benátʃe	
086	fish net	red	ataʒajɨ́-ʃa	Spanish loanword
087	fish hook	anzuelo	ansuelɨ-bxuá	Spanish loanword
088	axe	hacha	tatɕnía	Spanish loanword
089	knife	cuchillo	kutʃiljɨ-bxa	Spanish loanword
090	canoe	canoa	kanoú-ɕe	
091	paddle	remo	ʒem-bé	Spanish loanword
092	club	porra, macana	ngarot-bé	Spanish loanword
093	spear	lanza	lantsɨ́-ʃa	Spanish loanword
094	bow	arco de cazar	arkú-bxa	Spanish loanword
095	arrow	flecha	pletʃɨ-bxuá	Spanish loanword
096	blowgun	cerbatana	. xuesanɨ-ɕa	
097	tapir	danta	bɨtsijá	
098	jaguar	tigre	tígre	Spanish loanword
099	puma	león, puma	león	Spanish loanword
100	armadillo	armadillo	armadiljo-bé	
101	dog	perro	kéɕe	
102	deer	venado	biángana, móngoxo	
103	bat	murciélago	tʃimbiláko	
104	otter	nutria	salado-bé	
105	cebus monkey (Cebus capucinus)	capuchin, machín	komendéro	Spanish loanword
110	spotted cavy	paca, guagua	mɨmaɕe	
113	tortoise	tortuga	tortúga-ɕe	Spanish loanword
115	collared peccary	saíno	saín kótɕe	Spanish loanword
117	agouti	agutí	entsóje-ɕe	
118	rat	rata	ʒáta-tɕe	Spanish loanword
119	cat	gato	meséto	
120	mouse	ratón	ʃiéna	
121	tail	cola	waskuatɕi-xuá	
122	snake	serpiente, culebra	mɨtɕkuáje	
123	anaconda, water boa	mapana	amarón	
126	toad	sapo	sápo	Spanish loanword
127	bird	pájaro	ʃlóbtɕe	
128	hummingbird	picaflor, colibrí	ngɨntsiána	
130	toucan	tucán	pikúdo	
131	parrot	loro	ʃatúo, ʃatú	
133	buzzard	gallinazo	ngaljináso	Spanish loanword
134	curassow	pavo	tʃúmbo	
135	owl	lechuza, buho	koskúngo	
136	guan	pava de monte	kukuána	
137	hen	gallina	tuámba	
138	fish	pescado	beóna	
140	bee	abeja	txowána	
141	fly	mosca	ʃatsɨbiána	
142	flea	pulga	nzantsána	
143	louse	piojo	mɨtsána	
144	mosquito	zancudo	ʃɨngna-bxa	
146	ant	hormiga	xuána	
147	spider	arana	báxna, batʃná-ɕe	
148	jigger flea	nigua, pigue	tsɨtxóna	
149	bush, jungle	monte	txá-ɲe	
150	open grassland	pajonal, sabana	xatʃáɲe	
151	hill	cerro, loma	batsxáɲe	
152	tree	árbol	betíje, betijé-ʃe	
153	leaf	hoja	tsbuaná-tʃe	
154	tree leaf	hoja de árbol	tsbuaná-tʃe	
155	flower	flor	wantɕebxú-ʃa	
156	fruit	fruta	ʃaxuan-bé	
158	root	raíz	tbɨtɨ́-xa	
159	seed	semilla	xénaje	
160	stick	palo	niɲɨ́-ɕe	
161	grass	hierba	ʃákuana	
162	corn, maize	maíz	mátse	
163	manioc	yuca	bʃendɨ́-ɕe	
165	tobacco	tabaco	tbáko	Spanish loanword
166	cotton	algodón	tongéntse-ʃe	
167	gourd	calabazo poro	taus-bé	
168	yam	ñame	tʃaná	
169	sweet potato	camote	mijá	
170	achiote	achiote, bija	mandorɨ́-ʃa	
171	chili pepper	ají	tsɨtɕá	
173	Banisterium, hallucinogenic vine	ayahuasca, jajé	biaxíje	
174	plantain	plátano	blandɨ́-tɕa	Spanish loanword
178	cane	caña brava	ɕɨ́-ɕe	
179	salt	sal	tamó	
180	chicha	chicha, masato	bóko-ye	
181	one	uno	kánje	
182	two	dos	úta	
183	three	tres	únga	
184	four	cuatro	kánta	
185	five	cinco	ʃátʃna	
190	ten	diez	bnɨ́tsan	
191	first	primero	natsána	
192	last	último	ústonoje	
193	rattle	sonajero, maraca	marakɨ́-ʃe	Spanish loanword
194	drum	tambor	ɕɨnxana-bé	
195	cushma	cushma	ʃabuanguanɨ-xuá	
196	ear ornament	orejera, arete	wamatsaxonjanɨ́-ʃa	
197	mask	máscara	xobɨ́tsanɨ-ɕe	
198	healer, shaman	curandero	tatɕmbuá, jobá	
199	chief	cacique, curaca, capitán	utabná, mandádo	Spanish loanword
200	I, me, my	yo, mí usted	átɕe	
201	you (singular)	usted	áka	
202	he	él	tʃá	
203	she	ella	tʃá	
204	we inclusive	nosotros inclusivo	bɨ́nga	
206	you plural	ustedes	tɕingabtánga	
207	they	ellos	tʃɨ́nga	
208	my hand	mi mano	átɕ-be kukuá-tɕe	
209	your (sg.) hand	tu mano	ák-be kukuá-tɕe	
210	his hand	su mano	tʃá-be kukuá-tɕe	
211	our hands	nuestras manos	bɨng-be kukuá-tɕe	
213	their hands	sus manos (de ellos)	tʃɨ́ng-be kukuátɕe	
214	my bow	mi arco	átɕ-be arkú-bxa	Spanish loanword
215	your bow	tu arco	ák-be arkú-bxa	
216	his bow	su arco (de él)	tsá-be arkú-bxa	
217	our bow	nuestro arco	bɨ́ng-be arkú-bxa	
219	their bow	su arco (de ellos)	tʃɨ́ng-be arkú-bxa	
220	big	grande	bɨ́ts	
221	small, little	pequeño	báse, bíntʃe	
222	cold	frío	ʃék-bana	
223	hot	caliente	ntɕníɲe	
224	good	bueno	tɕábe, tɕabá	
225	bad	malo	baká, bákna sóje	
226	white	blanco	bxántse	
227	black	negro	btsénga	
228	go!	vaya, ve!	m-ó-tsa	
229	come!	ven!	m-á-bo	
230	eat!	come!	m-ó-se	
231	drink!	bebe!	m-o-bɕé	
232	sleep!	duerme!	m-o-tsámana	
233	crown of head	corona	tʃinʃ-óka	
234	front teeth, incisors	dientes delanteros incisivos	btɨɕá-ɕe	
236	long hair	pelo largo	bɨ́n stxɨná-ʃe	
237	the neck region	garganta y cuello	bexɨ́ngua-xa	
238	Adam’s apple	nuez de la garganta	tamoɕtxon-bé	
239	upper back	espalda, parte superior	stɨtɕá-xa	
241	wrist	muñeca	ʃɨmia-bé	
242	lower leg	pierna inferior	ɕɨbxá-tɕe	
243	body hair	el pelo del cuerpo	bobo-ʃɨ́-xa	
244	stomach	estómago	wabsbiá	
245	intestines	intestinos	tʃuntʃuljɨ-xua-ngá	
246	old woman	viejita	wela-xéma	
247	clouds at rest	nubes quietas	xantɕetɨ́-ʃe	
249	cultivated clearing	roza, sementera de maíz	taɕxá-ɲe	
250	stream	quebrada	báse béxa-je	
251	pebbles	piedrecillas	ndɨtɕmé-ʃe	
252	huge rocks	rocas grandes	peɲí-ɕe	Spanish loanword
253	path, trail	camino, sendero, trocha	axʃatʃnɨxní-ɲe	
255	shelter	rancho	tambo-téma	
256	this	este	kém	
257	that	eso, ese, aquel	tʃɨ́	
258	who	quién	ndá, ndmuá	
259	what	que	ndajá	
260	not	no	ndóɲe	
261	all	todos	njćtska	
262	many	muchos	bɨtská, bá, bá-nga	
263	long	largo	bɨ́n	
264	bark	corteza	xubobá-ʃe	
265	flesh	carne	mɨntɕéna	
267	grease, animal fat	grasa	minjiká	Spanish loanword
268	egg	huevo	ʃɨmnɨ-bé	
269	horn	cuerno	tsɨtxoní-ɕe	
270	feather	pluma	plumɨ-bxuá	Spanish loanword
271	elaw, nail	uña, garra	ngétsebia-ɕe	
272	belly	barriga	wabsbiá	
273	liver	hígado	bekotʃká	
274	drink	beber	xatmuána, xobɕiána	
275	eat	comer	xasána	
276	bite	morder	xaxantsána	
277	see	ver	xinjána	
278	hear	oir	xowenána	
279	know	saber	xtsetatɕmbuána	
280	sleep	dormir	xómanana	
281	die	morir	xóbanana	
282	kill	matar	xóbana	
283	swim (not bathe)	nadar	xatʃbabána	
284	fly	volar	xongébxuana	
285	walk	andar	xtsanána	
286	come	venir	xabána	
287	lie down	acostarse	xtsexáxonana	
288	sit down	sentarse	xotbemána	
289	stand	ponerse en pie, de pie	xotsajána	
290	give	dar	xatɕetajána	
291	say	decir	xajanána	
292	burn	quemar, arder	xtsejiɲána	
293	mountain	montaña	xáɲe	
294	red	rojo	buángana	
295	green	verde	ngɨ́bʃna	
296	yellow	amarillo	tsɨɕijána	
297	full	lleno	xútxena	
298	new	nuevo	tsɨ́m	
299	round	redondo	-bé	
300	dry	seco	boxóxo, buaʃána	
301	name	nombre	wabáina	
302	how	cómo	ntɕámo	
303	when	cuándo	ntséko, ntséko ora	
304	where	donde	ndm-óka, ndaj-éntɕe	
305	here	aquí	mu-éntɕe	
306	there	allí	tʃ-éntɕe	
307	other	otro	ínje, injá	
308	few	poco	batɕá, básebta	
309	fog	neblina	xantɕetɨ́-ʃe	
310	flow	fluir	xtsobuána	
311	sea	mar	már béxa-je	
312	wet	mojado	btʃékuana	
313	wash	lavar	xáxabiana	
314	worm	gusano	tsɨkɨmiána	
315	wing	ala	xuatɨngmiá-ʃa	
316	fur	piel peluda	bobo-ʃá, bobó-ʃe	
317	navel	ombligo	wamɨʃtɨtɨ́-ɕa	
318	saliva	saliva	jebuá-je	
319	milk	leche	létɕi-je	Spanish loanword
320	with	con	-ka, -btaka	
321	in	en	-óka, -íɲe, -éntɕe	
322	at	en, lugar definido	-óka	
323	if	si	-se, -sna	
324	ice	hielo	jélo	Spanish loanword
326	freeze	helarse	xtseʃekbána	
327	child	niño	báse-tema	
328	dark	oscuro	ibéta	
329	cut	cortar	kutʃú-j	
330	wide	ancho	tɨntɕá	
331	narrow	estrecho, angosto	báse tɨntɕá	
332	far	lejos	bɨn-óka	
333	near	cerca	béko-ɲe	
334	thick	grueso	xoʃá	
335	thin	delgado	báse xoʃá	
336	short	corto	béko	
337	heavy	pesado	teʃut-, úta	
338	dull	embotado	ndɨ-ngmɨtʃɨ́-bxa	
339	sharp	afilado	bɕá-xa, ngmitʃɨ́-bxa	
340	dirty	sucio	tsénga, tsengá	
341	rotten	podrido	xanguána	
342	smooth	liso	bɨngɨnjána	
343	straight	recto	nderítʃe	
344	correct	correcto	tɕabá	
345	left	izquierdo	waɲikuaj-ói-ka	
346	right	derecho	katʃbi-ói-ka	
347	old	viejo	tángua	
348	rub	frotar	xanɨtxuána	
349	pull	jalar, arrastrar	xuasxanána	
350	push	empujar	xatsɨntɕána	
351	throw	botar, tirar	xutɕenána	
352	hit	golpear	xuénanana	
353	split	hender	xaʃtɨtɕána	
354	pierce	punzar, chuzar	xangɨsɨtxuána	
355	dig	cavar	xaxutxuána	
356	tie	atar	xabátsikana	
357	sew	coser	xuaxonajána	
358	fall	caer	xotsatɕána	
359	swell	hinchar	xabʃatʃána	
360	think	pensar	xenóxuabojana	
361	sing	cantar	xabérsiana	Spanish loanword
362	smell	oler	xongɨtsetɕiána	
363	vomit	vomitar	xáʃkonana	
364	suck	chupar	xobkuakuajána	
365	blow	soplar	xangowána	
366	fear	temer	xtsawatxána	
367	tighten, squeeze	apretar, exprimir	xatɨbána	
368	hold	sostener	xotbajána	
369	down	abajo	tsɨtx-óka	
370	up	arriba	tsbanán-oka	
371	ripe	maduro	bótʃena	
372	dust	polvo	polbɨ́-ʃe	Spanish loanword
373	alive	vivo	ainá	
374	rope	cuerda	biá-xa	
375	year	año	wáta	

== Bibliography ==
- Campbell, Lyle (1997). American Indian Languages: The Historical Linguistics of Native America. New York: Oxford University Press. ISBN 0-19-509427-1.
- Fabre, Alain (2001). Kamsá, a poorly documented isolated language spoken in south-western Colombia (PDF). Linguistic Perspectives on Endangered Languages. Helsinki. Archived from the original (PDF) on 2019-03-31.
- Fabre, Alain (2020-06-20) [2005]. "Diccionario etnolingüístico y guía bibliográfica de los pueblos indígenas sudamericanos: KAMSÁ" (PDF). Electronic. OCLC 934761027. Archived from the original (PDF) on 2023-10-07.
- Howard, Linda (1972). "Fonología del camsá" (PDF). Sistemas fonológicos de idiomas colombianos (in Spanish). Vol. I. pp. 77–92. Archived from the original (PDF) on 2023-12-29.
- Huber, Randall Q.; Reed, Robert B. (1992). Vocabulario comparativo: Palabras selectas de lenguas indígenas de Colombia [Comparative vocabulary: Selected words in indigenous languages of Colombia] (PDF). Bogotá: Summer Institute of Linguistics. ISBN 958-21-0037-0. Archived from the original on 2023-10-14.
- Jolkesky, Marcelo Pinho de Valhery (2016). Estudo arqueo-ecolinguístico das terras tropicais sul-americanas (Ph.D. dissertation) (2 ed.). Brasília: University of Brasília.
- Kaufman, Terrence (1990). "Language History in South America: What We Know and How to Know More". In Payne, D. L. (ed.). Amazonian Linguistics: Studies in Lowland South American Languages. Austin: University of Texas Press. pp. 13–67. ISBN 0-292-70414-3.
- Kaufman, Terrence (1994). "The Native Languages of South America". In Mosley, C.; Asher, R. E. (eds.). Atlas of the World's Languages. London: Routledge. pp. 46–76.
- McDowell, John Holmes (1994). "So Wise Were Our Elders": Mythic Narratives of the Kamsá. Native American Studies. Vol. 6. Lexington, KY: University Press of Kentucky. ISBN 9780813160368. OL 1397564M. (Contains mythic and legendary in Camsá with interlinear morphemic glossing and English translations.)
- Mason, John Alden (1950). "The languages of South America". In Steward, Julian (ed.). Handbook of South American Indians. Vol. 6. Washington: Smithsonian Institution. pp. 157–317.
- O'Brien, Colleen Alena (2018). A grammatical description of Kamsá, a language isolate of Colombia (PDF) (phd thesis). University of Hawaiʻi at Mānoa. hdl:10125/62512.
