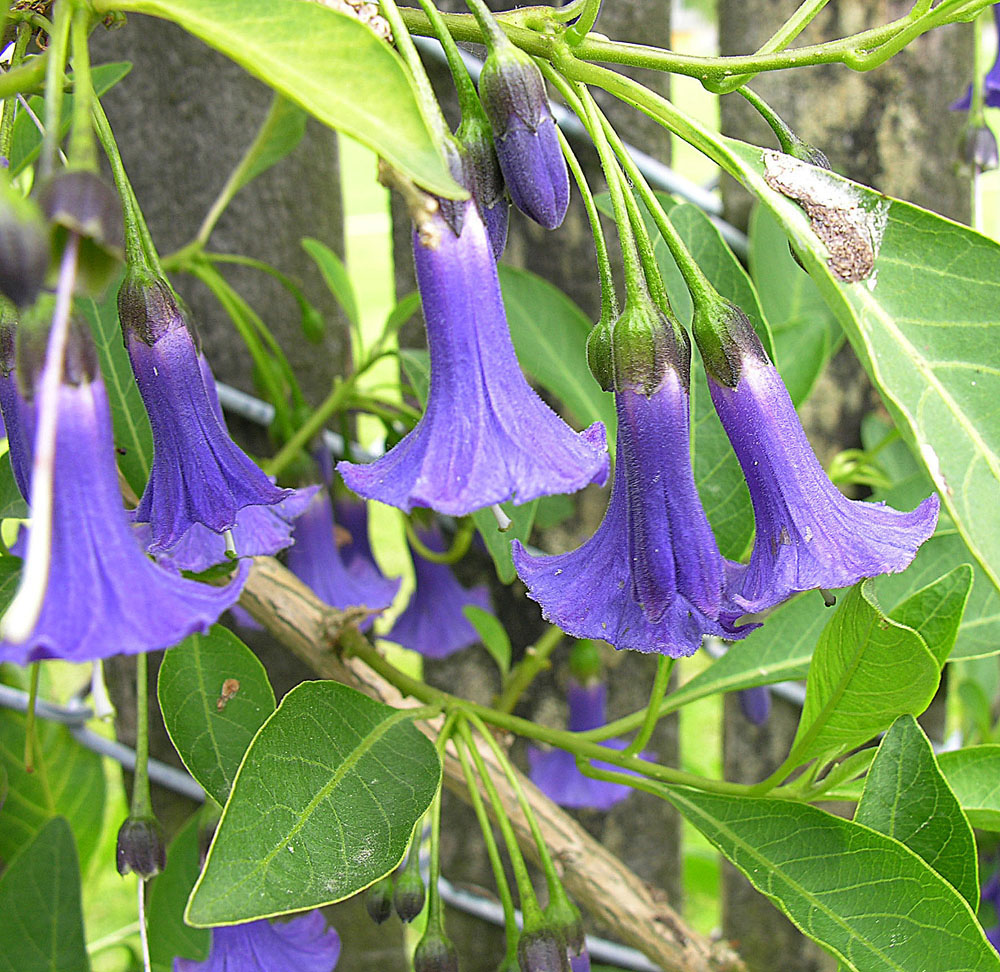
- Eriolarynx australis

Scientific classification
- Kingdom: Plantae
- Clade: Embryophytes
- Clade: Tracheophytes
- Clade: Spermatophytes
- Clade: Angiosperms
- Clade: Eudicots
- Clade: Asterids
- Order: Solanales
- Family: Solanaceae
- Tribe: Physaleae
- Subtribe: Iochrominae
- Genus: Eriolarynx (Hunz.) Hunz.

Species
- See text

= Eriolarynx =

Genus of flowering plants

Eriolarynx is a genus of flowering plants in the family Solanaceae, found in Peru, Bolivia and northern Argentina. Their trumpet-shaped flowers are pollinated by hummingbirds, and to a lesser extent, bees.

== Species ==
Currently accepted species include:

- Eriolarynx australis (Griseb.) J.M.H.Shaw
- Eriolarynx fasciculata (Miers) Hunz.
- Eriolarynx iochromoides (Hunz.) Hunz.
- Eriolarynx lorentzii (Dammer) Hunz.
