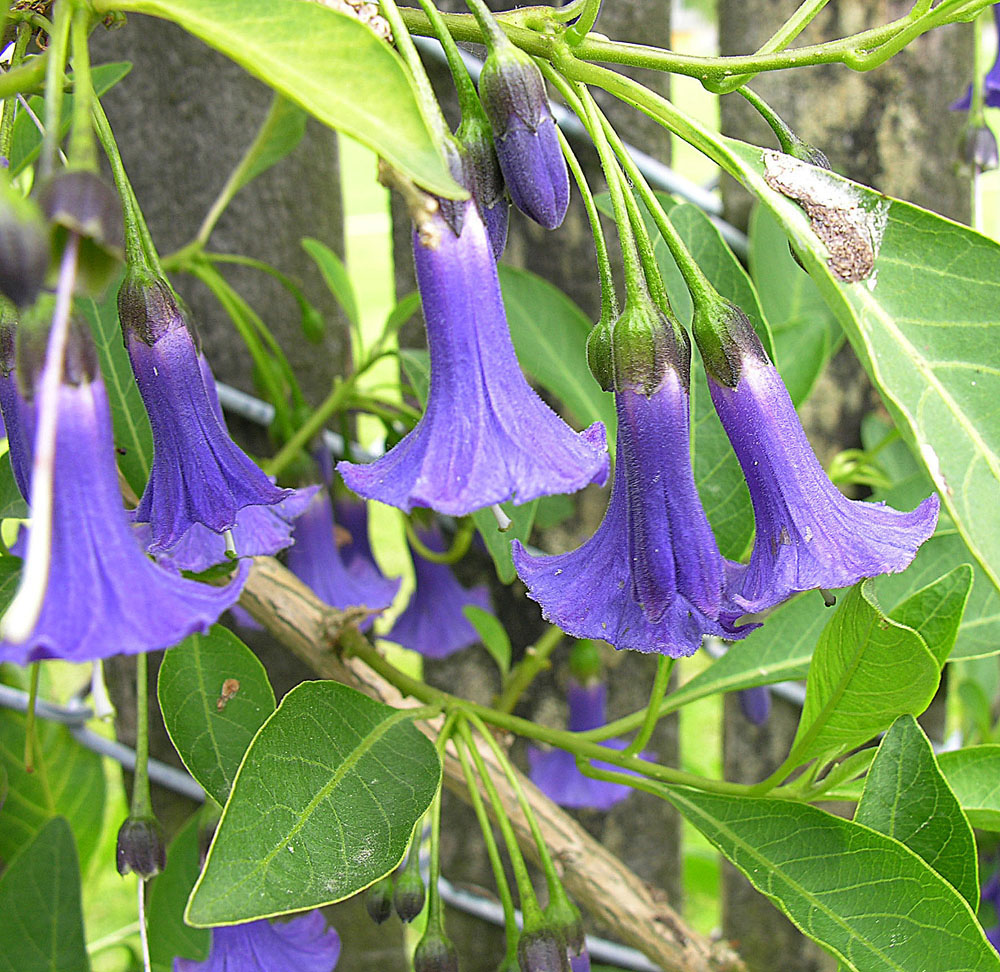

Scientific classification
- Kingdom: Plantae
- Clade: Embryophytes
- Clade: Tracheophytes
- Clade: Spermatophytes
- Clade: Angiosperms
- Clade: Eudicots
- Clade: Asterids
- Order: Solanales
- Family: Solanaceae
- Genus: Eriolarynx
- Species: E. australis

Binomial name
- Eriolarynx australis (Griseb.) J.M.H.Shaw

Synonyms
- List: Acnistus australis (Griseb.) Griseb.; Acnistus australis var. grandiflorus Griseb.; Dierbachia australis (Griseb.) Kuntze; Dunalia australis (Griseb.) Sleumer; Iochroma australe Griseb.

= Eriolarynx australis =

Species of flowering plant

Eriolarynx australis, called mini angel's trumpet or blue angel's trumpet, is a species of flowering plant in the genus Eriolarynx, native to Bolivia and northwest Argentina. It is widely listed in the horticultural literature under the synonym Iochroma australe. It has gained the Royal Horticultural Society's Award of Garden Merit.

It is a compact shrub to 2.5 m (8.2 ft) tall and broad, with downy leaves and pale violet-blue trumpet-shaped pendent blooms in summer. It is hardy in mild regions, otherwise must be grown under glass. It needs a sheltered position in full sun.

The Latin specific epithet australis means "southern".

Some cultivars are known, originally described under the synonym Iochroma australe:

- E. australe 'Andean Snow'
- E. australe 'Bill Evans'
- E. australe 'Sunrise'

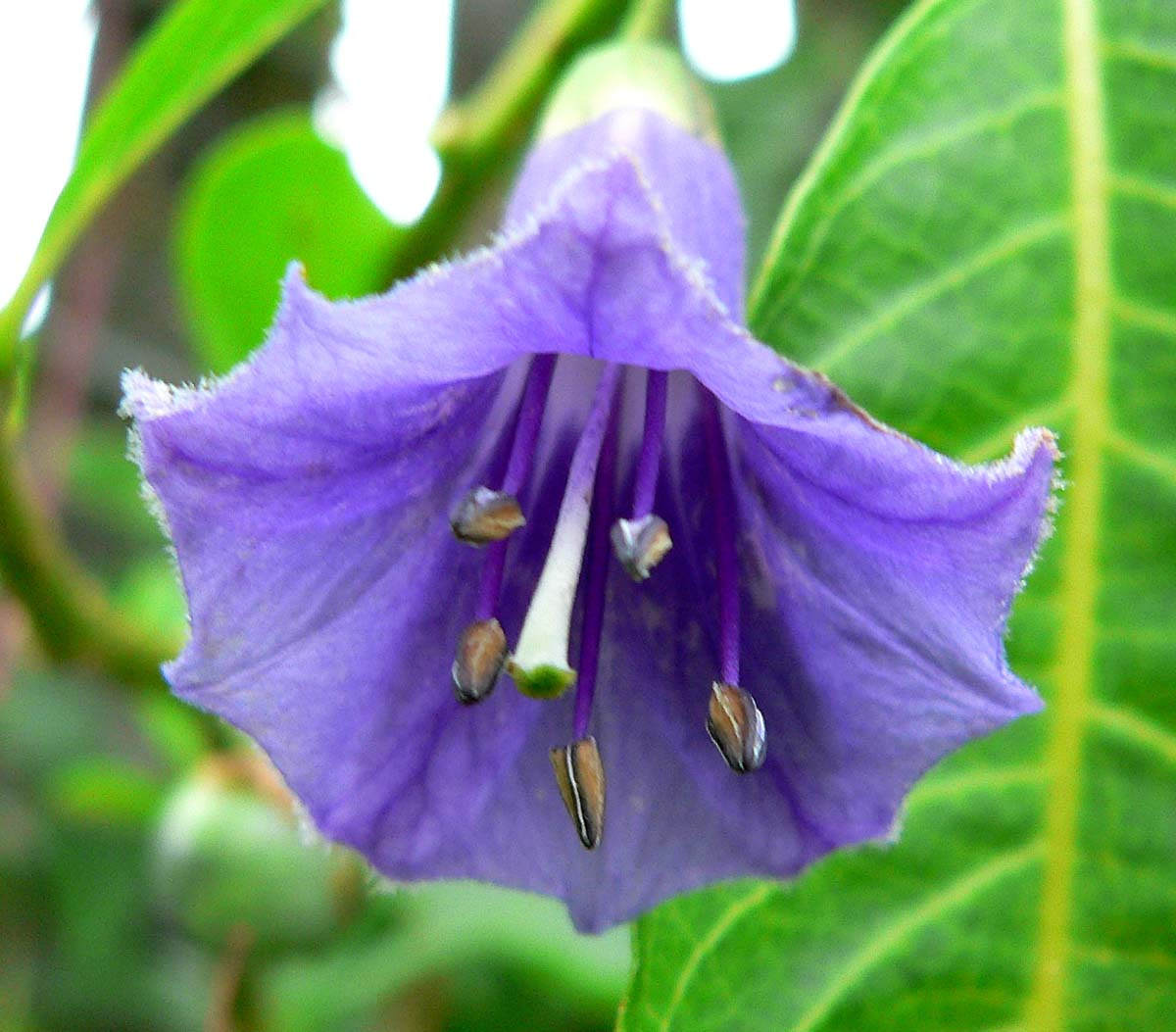
Cultivated plant, growing at UBC Botanical Garden, British Columbia
