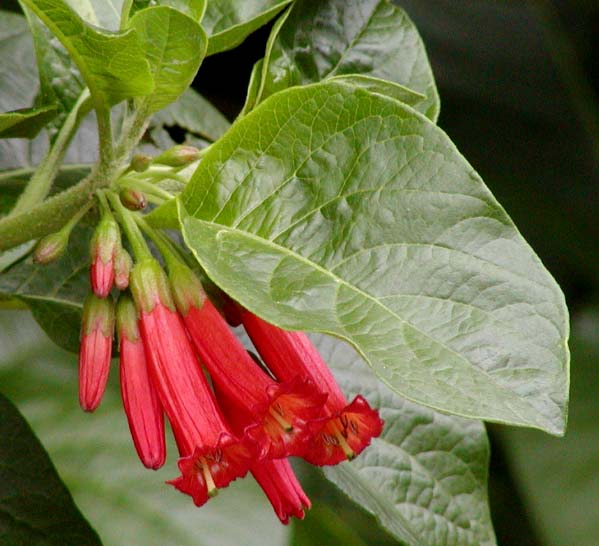

Scientific classification
- Kingdom: Plantae
- Clade: Tracheophytes
- Clade: Angiosperms
- Clade: Eudicots
- Clade: Asterids
- Order: Solanales
- Family: Solanaceae
- Genus: Iochroma
- Species: I. fuchsioides

Binomial name
- Iochroma fuchsioides (Bonpl.) Miers

Synonyms
- Iochroma puniceum Werderm. Iochroma sodiroi Dammer; Lycium fuchsioides Bonpl.

= Iochroma fuchsioides =

Species of flowering plant

Iochroma fuchsioides is an Iochroma species found in Ecuador and Colombia. It was first described in 1848. In addition to the known withanolide D {1}, three new withanolides have been isolated from Iochroma fuchsioides.
