= Sibundoy =

- Municipality & town
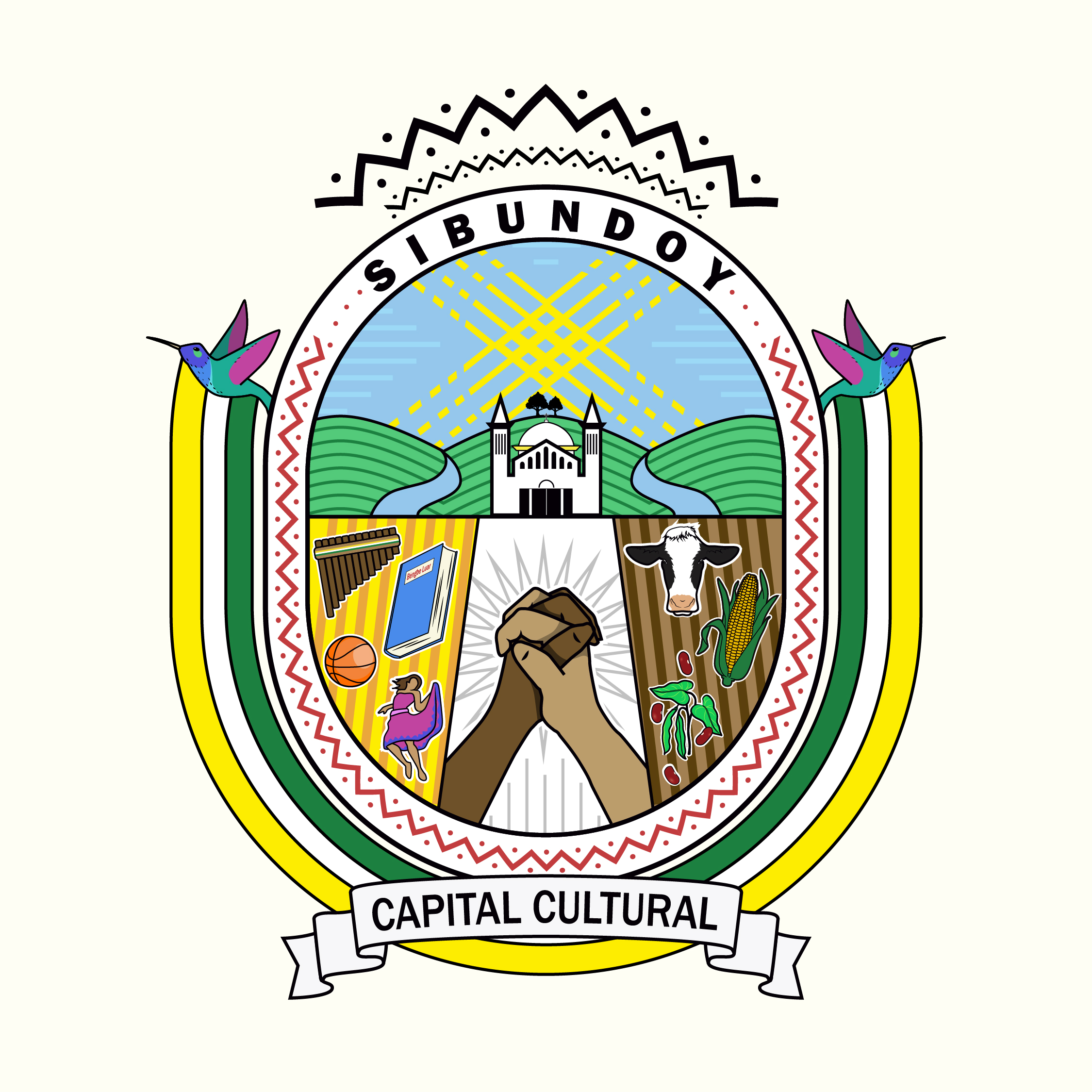
- Flag Coat of arms

- Location of the municipality and town of Sibundoy in the Putumayo Department of Colombia
- Coordinates: 1°12′12″N 76°55′9″W
- Country: Colombia
- Department: Putumayo Department

Area
  - Total: 64 km^{2} (25 sq mi)

Population (Census 2018)
  - Total: 14,104
  - Density: 220/km^{2} (570/sq mi)
- Time zone: UTC-5 (Colombia Standard Time)

Sibundoy (Kamëntsá: Tabanok "village") is a town and municipality in the Putumayo Department of the Republic of Colombia.

The town existed well before the Spanish came in 1534. The Inca, under Huayna Cápac, conquered the local Kamëntsá people in 1492 and established a Quechua-speaking settlement; their descendants are the modern Inga people. Most residents of Sibundoy are either Kamëntsá or Inga. Spanish is the primary language, but the Kamëntsá language and Inga language are also widely spoken. Many indigenous residents of Sibundoy and wear long, blue and violet ponchos called kapisaius and baitas.

Sibundoy is known for mask carving and other traditional crafts. In the town's park, the trunks of fallen trees are carved with symbols from the mythology of the Inga and Kamëntsá peoples.

== Climate ==
Climate data for Sibundoy (Primavera La), elevation 2,067 m (6,781 ft), (1981–2010)
Month	Jan	Feb	Mar	Apr	May	Jun	Jul	Aug	Sep	Oct	Nov	Dec	Year
Mean daily maximum °C (°F)	21.3 (70.3)	21.3 (70.3)	21.1 (70.0)	20.8 (69.4)	20.4 (68.7)	19.3 (66.7)	18.9 (66.0)	19.2 (66.6)	20.2 (68.4)	21.2 (70.2)	21.8 (71.2)	21.5 (70.7)	20.6 (69.1)
Daily mean °C (°F)	15.8 (60.4)	15.8 (60.4)	15.8 (60.4)	15.7 (60.3)	15.8 (60.4)	15.1 (59.2)	14.7 (58.5)	14.6 (58.3)	15.0 (59.0)	15.7 (60.3)	16.2 (61.2)	16.1 (61.0)	15.5 (59.9)
Mean daily minimum °C (°F)	10.4 (50.7)	10.8 (51.4)	11.0 (51.8)	11.5 (52.7)	11.7 (53.1)	11.2 (52.2)	10.7 (51.3)	10.3 (50.5)	9.8 (49.6)	10.4 (50.7)	10.8 (51.4)	10.8 (51.4)	10.8 (51.4)
Average precipitation mm (inches)	88.0 (3.46)	108.4 (4.27)	129.3 (5.09)	169.5 (6.67)	197.3 (7.77)	212.9 (8.38)	204.3 (8.04)	145.6 (5.73)	121.0 (4.76)	116.2 (4.57)	101.3 (3.99)	99.9 (3.93)	1,635.5 (64.39)
Average precipitation days	18	17	20	22	24	24	23	22	20	19	18	17	236
Average relative humidity (%)	86	86	86	88	88	89	87	87	86	86	85	86	87
Mean monthly sunshine hours	102.3	76.2	68.2	63.0	65.1	54.0	55.8	65.1	75.0	89.9	102.0	111.6	928.2
Mean daily sunshine hours	3.3	2.7	2.2	2.1	2.1	1.8	1.8	2.1	2.5	2.9	3.4	3.6	2.5
Source: Instituto de Hidrologia Meteorologia y Estudios Ambientales

== See also ==
- Kamëntsá people
- Inga people
