= Paint It Black (disambiguation) =

"Paint It Black" is a 1966 song by The Rolling Stones.

Paint It Black or Paint It, Black may also refer to:

== Music ==
- Paint It Black (band), an American hardcore punk band
- Paint It Black (Bish song), 2018
- "Paint It Black", a song by Gob on How Far Shallow Takes You
- "Amai Wana (Paint It, Black)", a song by Hikaru Utada on First Love

== Other uses ==
- Paint It Black (1989 film), a film directed by Tim Hunter
- Paint It Black (2016 film), a film directed by Amber Tamblyn and based on the Janet Fitch's novel
- Paint It Black (novel), a novel by Janet Fitch
- "Paint It Black", an episode from the Canadian television series The Bridge

== See also ==
- Painted Black (disambiguation)
