= Amy Aquino on screen and stage =

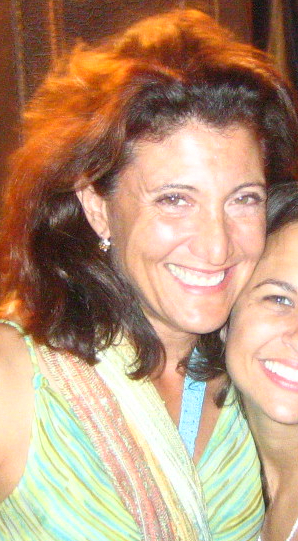
Aquino in 2006.

Amy Aquino is an American actress of television, film and stage. As a honors graduate in biology from Harvard Radcliffe Institute, she studied acting at the Yale School of Drama. She was accepted after three attempts and received an MFA.

Aquino began her television career with guest spots in Easy Street (1987) and Hooperman (1987) before landing a lead role in the six-episode series One of the Boys (1989). There, she performed Bernice DiSalvo, the wisecracking best friend of Maria Conchita Navarro (Latin American star María Conchita Alonso) who struggled with relationships. She landed another main role in Brooklyn Bridge (1991–1993), which starred a Jewish family where Aquino's character, Phyllis Berger Silver, was the mother of Alan Silver. Although critically-acclaimed and a cult hit, Brooklyn Bridge's ratings were not strong enough to provide it more than two seasons. Her next lead was Lieutenant Grace Billets, superior of the title character who works in the Homicide Department of the Hollywood Division of the LAPD, in Amazon Studios' streaming series Bosch (2014–2021).

Most of her television roles are recurring or guest, usually performing intelligent, assertive powerful women and professionals in medical and legal fields, such as psychologists, oncologists, gynecologists, judges, detectives, defense attorneys and district attorneys. In 1996, she was nominated for a Screen Actors Guild award for her role as Dr. Joanna 'Joey' Diamond in David E. Kelley's family drama series Picket Fences (1995–1996). Her other recurring roles as doctors include Dr. Janet Coburn in ER (1995–2009), Dr. Toni Pavone in Felicity (2000–2002), and Dr. Christina Raynor in The Falcon and the Winter Soldier (2021).

Although a huge majority of her work is in television, Aquino has appeared in film as well. Her most notable film roles are her earliest, obtaining them instantly after graduating from Yale: Bonnie, the hairdresser of Cher's character in Moonstruck (1987) that screamed "I've been dying to do this for years!" and Tess's secretary Alice Baxter, who informs Tess she is the boss of a windowed office at the end of Working Girl (1988). She was also in the 2002 adaptation of Janet Fitch's White Oleander as Miss Martinez.

== Film ==
List of Amy Aquino theatrical film credits
Year	Title	Role	Notes	Ref(s)
1987	Moonstruck	Bonnie		
1988	Working Girl	Alice Baxter		
1992	Alan & Naomi	Ruth Silverman		
1995	Boys on the Side	Anna		
2002	Undisputed	Darlene Early		
2002	White Oleander	Miss Martinez		
2003	National Security	Councilwoman		
2003	The Singing Detective	Nurse Nozhki		
2004	In Good Company	Alicia		
2004	Woman Thou Art Loosed	Miss Rodgers		
2005	A Lot Like Love	Diane Martin		
2009	In My Sleep	Detective Curwen		
2013	In Security	Lena's Mom		
2015	The Lazarus Effect	President Dalley		
2016	Hacked	Mushira		
2017	Sensum	Dr. Rita Montal	Short film	
2018	Beautiful Boy	Annie Goldblum		
2022	The Grotto	Arnel Platte		
2022	Minutemen	Central Command	Short film	
2024	Juror #2	Judge Thelma Hollub		

== Television series ==
List of Amy Aquino television series credits
Year	Title	Role	Notes	Ref(s)
1987	Easy Street	Angelica Debenedetto	2 episodes	
1987	Hooperman	Attorney Shuman	Episode: "Hooperman"	
1989	One of the Boys	Bernice DeSalvo (Note: Sources differ regarding the surname of her character in One of the Boys. A contemporaneous Star-News interview spells it as DeSalvo, but retrospective sources present it as DiSalvo.)	Regular role; 6 episodes	
1990	Law & Order	Erica Sothlmeyer	Episode: "Prisoner of Love"	
1991	Davis Rules	Mrs. Chavez	Episode: "Habla Espanol?"	
1991	Roseanne	Linda Wagner	Episode: "Dances with Darlene"	
1991–1993	Brooklyn Bridge	Phyllis Berger Silver	Regular role; 33 episodes	
1992	Lifestories: Families in Crisis	Carol Dipaolo	Episode: "Blood Brothers: The Joey DiPaolo Story"	
1993	Murphy Brown	Julianna	Episode: "Murphy and the Amazing Leaping Man"	
1993	Sisters	Iris	Episode: "The Whole Truth"	
1995–1996	Madman of the People	Sasha Danziger	Regular role; 16 episodes	
1995–1996	Picket Fences	Dr. Joanna "Joey" Diamond	Recurring role; 12 episodes	
1995–2009	ER	Dr. Janet Coburn	Recurring role; 26 episodes	
1996	The Larry Sanders Show	Rabbi Marcy Klein	Episode: "My Name Is Asher Kingsley"	
1997	Hiller and Diller	Mrs. Gregg	Episode: "Pilot"	
1997	Michael Hayes	Stephanie Lofton	Episode: "Heroes"	
1997	Ally McBeal	Dr. Harper	Episode: "Boy to the World"	
1998	Becker	Bev	Episode: "Pilot"	
1999	Zoe, Duncan, Jack and Jane	Mrs. Milch	3 episodes	
1999	7th Heaven	Ms. Williams	Episode: "...And Expiation"	
1999–2000	Judging Amy	Judge Greta Anastassio	3 episodes	
1999–2000	Action	Connie Hunt	2 episodes	
2000	The West Wing	Rebecca Reeseman	Episode: "The White House Pro-Am"	
2000	Freaks and Geeks	Lydia Schweiber	2 episodes	
2000	NYPD Blue	Annabelle Cito	Episode: "Lucky Luciano"	
2000	Time of Your Life	Mrs. Liebowitz	Episode: "The Time They Got E-Rotic"	
2000	That's Life	Bernadette	Episode: "Saint Bernadette"	
2000–2002	Felicity	Dr. Toni Pavone	Recurring role; 10 episodes	
2001	Gideon's Crossing	Dr. Katie Fieldstone	Episode: "Orphans"	
2001	Citizen Baines	Martina Isaacs	Episode: "Lost and Found"	
2001–2004	Crossing Jordan	Detective Lois Carver	8 episodes	
2001–2003	Curb Your Enthusiasm	Susan Braudy	2 episodes	
2002	Alias	Virginia Kerr	Episode: "The Indicator"	
2002–2005	Everybody Loves Raymond	Peggy Ardolino	4 episodes	
2003	The Practice	Judge Moreno	Episode: "Concealing Evidence"	
2004	Strong Medicine	Willa James	Episode: "Code"	
2005	Weeds	School Psychologist	Episode: "Lude Awakening"	
2005	CSI: NY	Diane Lipstone	Episode: "Supply and Demand"	
2005	Just Legal	Judge Sarah Abrahams	Episode: "Pilot"	
2005–2009	Monk	Mrs. Bowen, Rhonda	2 episodes	
2006	Ghost Whisperer	Georgina	Episode: "Demon Child"	
2006	Heist	Captain	3 episodes	
2006–2008	CSI: Crime Scene Investigation	A.D.A. Valerie Nichols	2 episodes	
2007	Desperate Housewives	Erika Gold	Episode: "Come Play Wiz Me"	
2007	Boston Legal	Judge Phyllis Tamber	Episode: "Trial of the Century"	
2007	Shark	Judge Grant	Episode: "In Absentia"	
2008	Head Case	Lorraine Finkelstein	Episode: "Goode Vibes"	
2008	The Closer	Laura Mayhan	Episode: "Speed Bump"	
2008	Twenty Good Years	Lois	Episode: "Come Fly with Me"	
2008	Grey's Anatomy	Marianne Grandy	Episode: "Brave New World"	
2009	Prison Break	Warden Alice Simmsis	2 episodes	
2009–2010	Brothers & Sisters	Dr. Joan Avadon	5 episodes	
2010	Private Practice	Claire	Episode: "In the Name of Love"	
2010	Big Love	Leslie Usher	2 episodes	
2010	Castle	Janine Marks	Episode: "The Late Shaft"	
2011	Harry's Law	Judge Marylin Coulis	5 episodes	
2012	The Finder	Cristina Farrel	4 episodes	
2012	The Whole Truth	Judge #2	2 episodes	
2013	The Mentalist	Judge Patricia Davis	2 episodes	
2013	Glee	Funny Girl Producer	2 episodes	
2013–2014	Being Human	Donna Gilchrist	Recurring role; 9 episodes	
2014	Suits	Judge	Episode: "Breakfast, Lunch and Dinner"	
2014–2021	Bosch	Lieutenant Grace Billets	Regular role; 68 episodes	
2020	Grace and Frankie	Dana Marino	Episode: "The Rescue"	
2020–2021	The Good Fight	Stella Corben	2 episodes	
2021	The Falcon and the Winter Soldier	Dr. Christina Raynor	Miniseries; 3 episodes	
2023	The Irrational	CJ	Episode: "Smell Test"	
2026	Spider-Noir	Dr. Faber	2 episodes	

== Television films ==
List of Amy Aquino television film credits
Year	Title	Role	Notes	Ref(s)
1990	Descending Angel	Catherine	TV film	
1991	The Last to Go	Ginny	TV film	
1991	False Arrest	Cathy Fox	Two-part TV film: "Part 1"	
1993	A Place to Be Loved	Debby Hunter	TV film	
1993	Jack Reed: Badge of Honor	Sharon Hilliard	TV film	
1994	Betrayal of Trust	Jeannie Wilcox	TV film	
1994	Once in a Lifetime	Barbara Jarvis	TV film	
1995	My Brother's Keeper	Terry	TV film	
2010	Deal O'Neal	Marie O'Neal	TV film	

== Stage ==
List of Amy Aquino stage credits
Year	Production	Role	Theatre	Notes	Ref(s)
1988	Cold Sweat	Fay	Playwrights Horizons		
1988	Right Behind the Flag	Catherine	Playwrights Horizons		
1990	Love Diatribe	Sandy	Circle Repertory Theatre		
1991	Road to Nirvana	Nirvana	Circle Repertory Theatre		
2005	Third	Nancy Gordon	Mitzi E. Newhouse Theater		
2008	Secrets of the Trade	Joanne Lipman	Black Dahlia Theatre	Nominated for an Ovation Award in Lead Actress in a Musical	
2010	Secrets of the Trade	Joanne Lipman	59E59 Theaters (Theater A)		
2017	The Siegel	Deborah	South Coast Repertory		
