= Daughter =

Female offspring

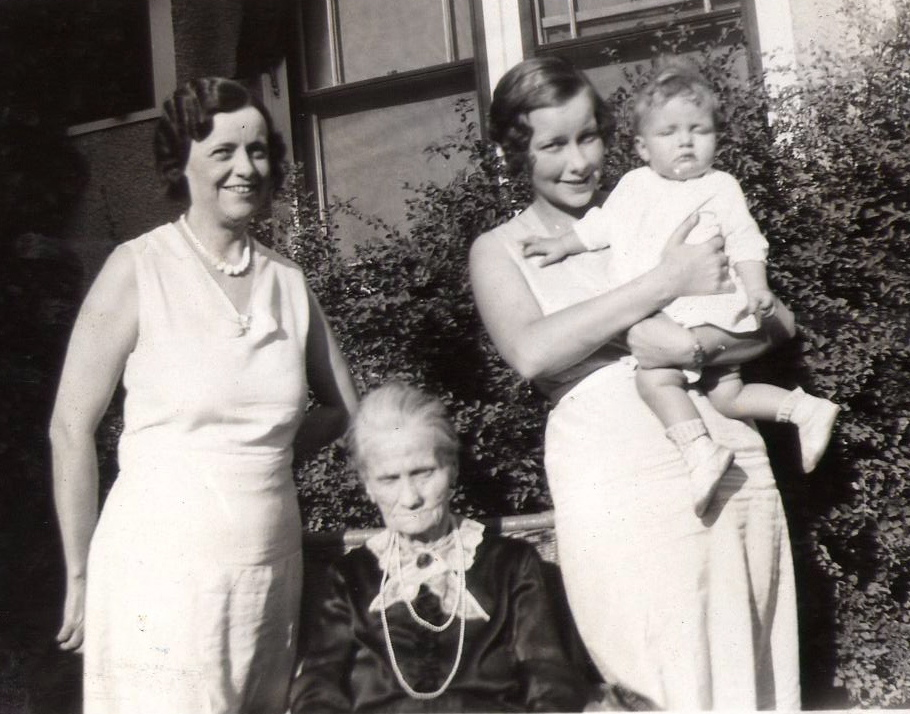
A 1931 photograph of four generations of mothers and daughters

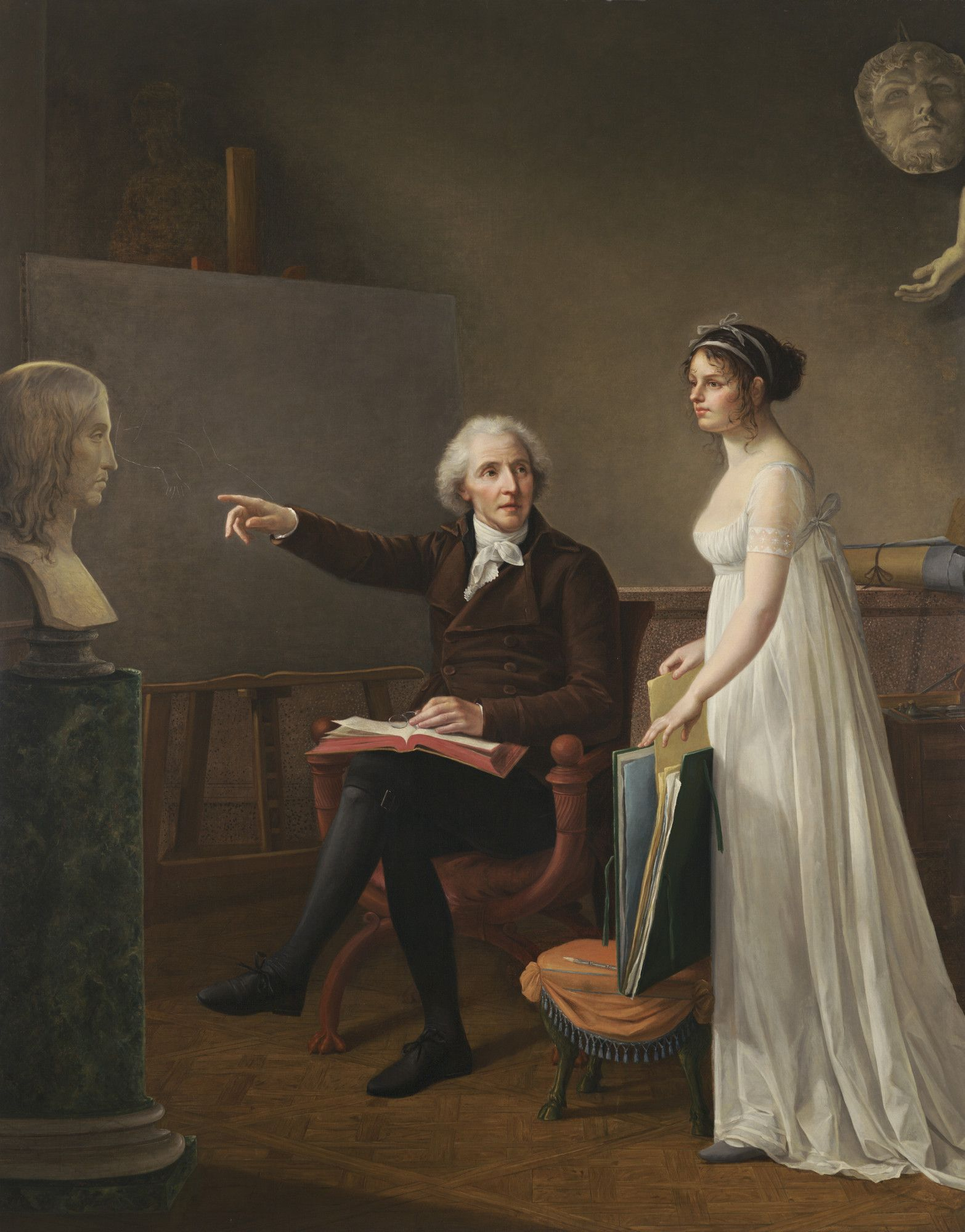
Pierre Mayer with his daughter Constance Mayer, painted by Constance Mayer

A daughter is a female offspring; a girl or a woman in relation to her parents. Daughterhood is the state, condition or quality of being someone's daughter. The male counterpart is a son. Analogously the name is used in several areas to show relations between groups or elements. From biological perspective, a daughter is a first degree relative. The word daughter also has several other connotations attached to it, one of these being used in reference to a female descendant or consanguinity. It can also be used as a term of endearment coming from an elder.

In patriarchal societies, daughters often have different or lesser familial rights than sons. A family may prefer to have sons rather than daughters and subject daughters to female infanticide. In some societies, it is the custom for a daughter to be 'sold' to her husband, who must pay a bride price. The reverse of this custom, where the parents pay the husband a sum of money to compensate for the financial burden of the woman and is known as a dowry.

The number next to each box in the Table of Consanguinity indicates the degree of relationship relative to the given person.

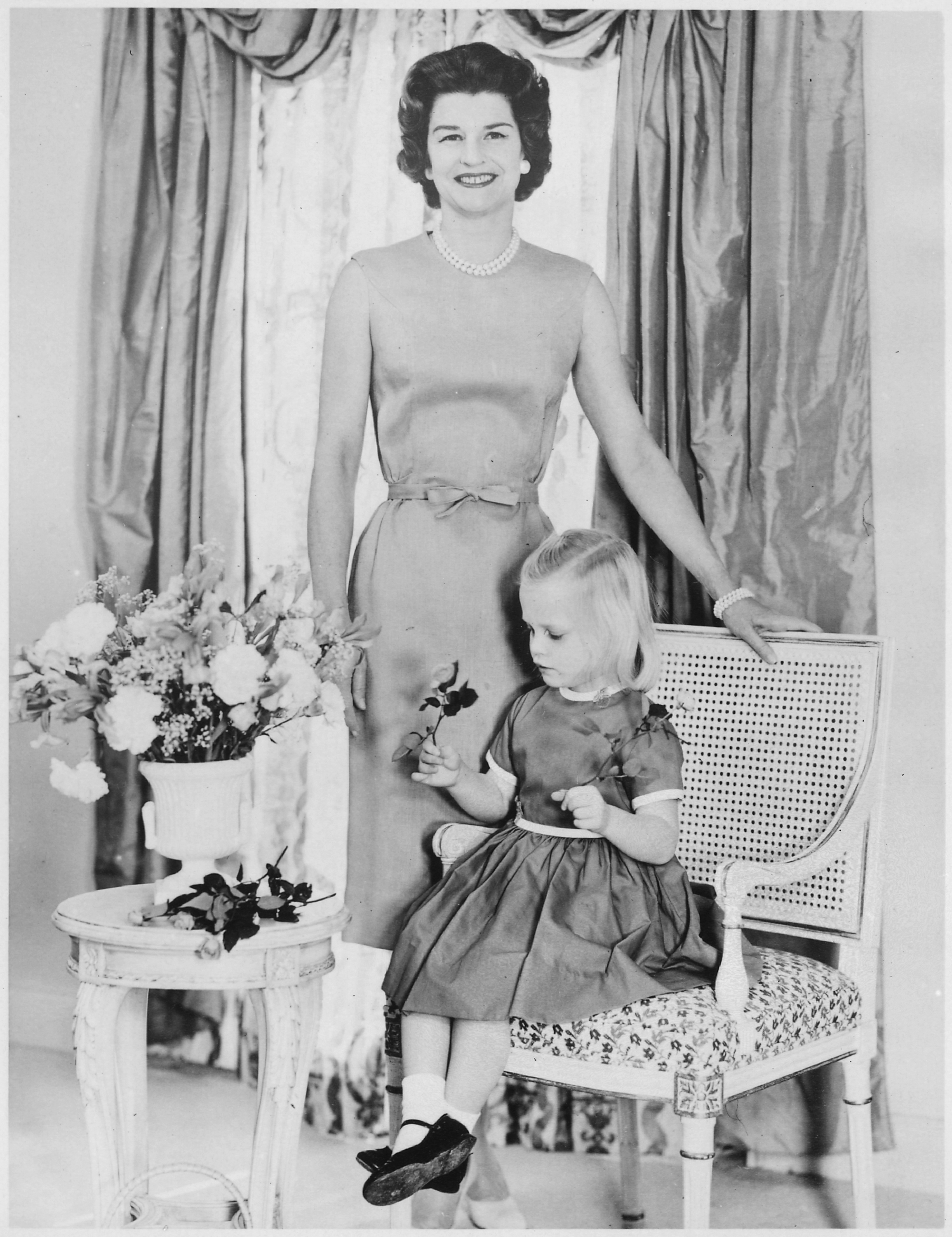
First lady of the United States Betty Ford with her daughter Susan Ford

== Perception ==
In the United States, the birth rate is 105 sons to 100 daughters which has been the natural birth rate since the 18th century. In the US, prospective parents seeking to adopt a child display a slight preference for girls over boys. In fertility clinics that enable sex preferences, daughters are usually preferred over sons. In the traditions of various Abrahamic religions, Luluwa is regarded as the first daughter to have ever existed.

== Daughters in literature ==
The role of the daughter has been an important theme in literature, especially when exploring relationships between family members and gender roles. Through exploration of the relationship between children and their parents, readers can draw conclusions about the impact of parenting style on the growth and development of a child's character and personality.

Notable daughters whose character and development has been impacted by their parents in literature have been:

Daughter	Parent/s	Novel	Author	Year
Elizabeth Bennet	Mr Bennet & Mrs Bennet (née Gardiner)	Pride and Prejudice	Jane Austen	1813
Jo March	Marmee March	Little Women	Louisa May Alcott	1868
Francie Nolan	Johnny and Katie Nolan	A Tree Grows in Brooklyn	Betty Smith	1943
Scout Finch	Atticus Finch	To Kill A Mockingbird	Harper Lee	1960
Meg Murry	Alex and Kate Murry	A Wrinkle In Time	Madeleine L’Engle	1962
Astrid Magnussen	Ingrid Magnussen and Klaus Anders	White Oleander	Janet Fitch	1999

== See also ==
- Nurture kinship
- Woman
