= List of breweries in Alabama =

Breweries in Alabama produce a wide range of beers in different styles that are marketed locally and regionally. In 2012 Alabama's then 17 breweries, importers, brewpubs, and company-owned packagers and wholesalers employed 60 people directly, and another 12,300 in related jobs such as wholesaling and retailing. Including people directly employed in brewing, as well as those who supply Alabama's breweries with everything from ingredients to machinery, the total business and personal tax revenue generated by Alabama's breweries and related industries was more than $259 million. Consumer purchases of Alabama's brewery products generated another $205 million in tax revenue. In 2012, according to the Brewers Association, Alabama ranked 49th in per capita craft breweries with 10.

For context, at the end of 2013 there were 2,822 breweries in the United States, including 2,768 craft breweries. In that same year, according to the Beer Institute, the brewing industry employed around 43,000 Americans in brewing and distribution and had a combined economic impact of more than $246 billion.

By 2017, there were over 27 breweries in Alabama (27 in the Alabama Brewer's Guild and at least 1 not)

Beer brewing was thriving in Alabama prior to 1909, when Prohibition laws banned the industry. As a result, for much of the 20th century, and until the law was changed in 2009, beer with an alcohol content greater than 6% (alcohol by volume) was unlawful in the state. The Brewery Modernization Act was signed into law in 2011, reforming many former restrictions on breweries' ability to provide a tap room and restrictive regulations regarding brewpubs. The Legal ABV limit of beer in Alabama is currently 13.9%. According to The New Yorker when discussing beer production, "from 2011 to 2012, annual production grew faster in the South than just about anywhere else, with the fastest-growing producers including Alabama (first out of all fifty states)..."

== Breweries ==
- Avondale Brewing Company – Birmingham
- Back Forty Beer Company – Gadsden
- Big Beach Brewing Company – Gulf Shores
- Birmingham District Brewing Company – Birmingham
- Black Warrior Brewing Company – Tuscaloosa
- Braided River Brewing Co. – Mobile
- Cahaba Brewing Company – Birmingham
- Chandlers Ford Brewing – Huntsville
- Chattahoochee Brewing Company – Phenix City
- Common Bond Brewers – Montgomery
- Cross-eyed Owl Brewing Company - Decatur
- Druid City Brewing Company – Tuscaloosa
- Fairhope Brewing Company – Fairhope
- Ferus Artisan Ales – Trussville, AL
- Folklore Brewing and Meadery – Dothan
- Ghost Train Brewing – Birmingham
- Goat Island Brewing - Cullman

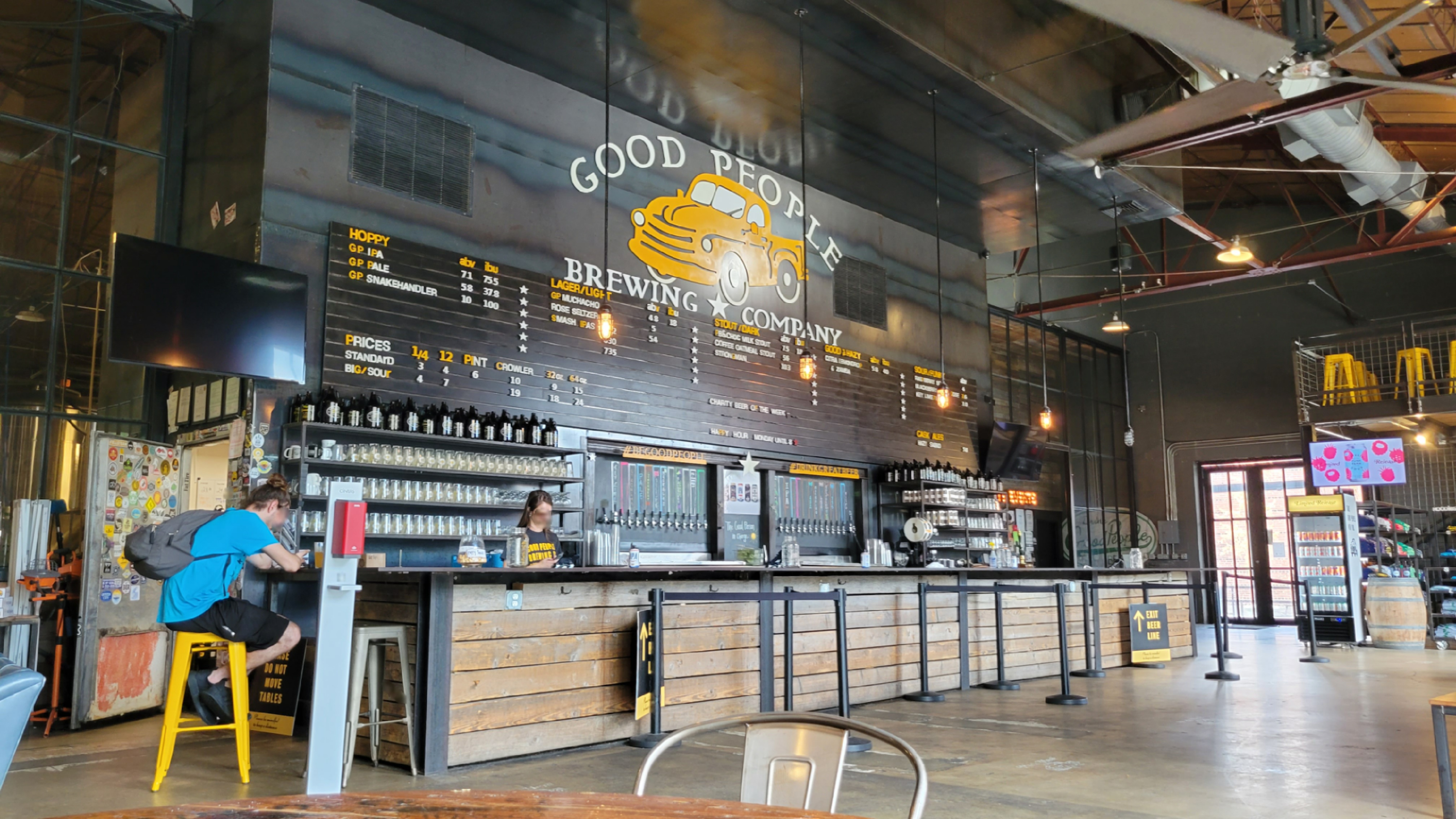
Good People Brewing Company in Birmingham, Alabama.

- Good People Brewing Company – Birmingham
- Green Bus Brewing – Huntsville
- Haint Blue Brewing Company - Mobile
- InnerSpace Brewing Co. - Huntsville
- Iron Hand Brewing - Mobile
- Low Brim Brewing - Foley
- Mad Malts (formerly "The Brew Stooges") – Huntsville
- Main Channel Brewing – Guntersville
- Old Black Bear Brewing Company – Madison
- Oversoul Brewing - Helena
- The Railyard Brewing Company – Montgomery
- Red Clay Brewing Company – Opelika
- Resting Pulse Brewing Company - Opelika
- Rocket Republic Brewing Company – Madison
- Siluria Brewing Co. - Alabaster
- Singin' River Brewing - Florence
- Slag Heap Brewing Co. - Trussville
- Straight to Ale Brewing – Huntsville
- Tallulah Brewing Company – Jasper
- Trim Tab Brewing Company – Birmingham
- True Story Brewing Co. - Birmingham
- Twisted Barley Brewing - Jasper
- Yellowhammer Brewing – Huntsville

== Closed breweries ==
- Alabama Brewing Company – operated by Isadore Newman, Arthur Isnard and A. Cammack from 1897 to 1908 (and manufacturing ice until 1917) in Birmingham
- Band of Brothers Brewing Company – operating from 2015–2018 in Tuscaloosa
- Barrett's Brewpub – 1990's in Tuscaloosa
- Beer Engineers contract brewed at Back Forty Brewing 2012-2014 and was to open facilities in Birmingham
- Below the Radar Closed in 2021 – Huntsville
- Birmingham Brewery / Philipp Schillinger Brewing Company – operated in Birmingham by Philipp Schillinger and his sons from 1884 to 1908
- Birmingham Brewing Company (1889–1893) – operated by W. I. Rushton from 1889 to 1893
- Birmingham Brewing Company (1992–1998) – operating from 1992 to 1998; its brands, Vulcan and Red Mountain, continued to be contract-brewed until 2001
- Blue Moose Cafe & Brewpub – in Cullman
- Blue Pants Brewery – operating from 2010 to 2019 in Madison
- Bluewater Brewing from 2016 to ?? in Florence
- Bowler Hat Brewing Co. – Huntsville
- Breckenridge Brewery – 1990s in Birmingham
- Cheaha Brewing Company operating from 2013 to 2019 in Anniston
- Dothan Brewing Company – operating in 2006 in Dothan
- Fractal Brewing Project - Huntsville
- The Huntsville Brewery – operating 2013-2014 in Huntsville
- Hurricane Brewing Company – operating 2006-2009 in Mobile
- Interstellar Ginger Beer and Exploration Co. - Alabaster
- Magic City Brewery – brew pub operating from 1995 to 2000 in Birmingham
- Mr. Jim's Cannon Brewpub – operating from 2004-2006 in Mobile
- Montgomery Brewing Company – operated from 1995-2010 in Montgomery
- Olde Auburn Ale House – was in operation from February 2000 until 2009 in Auburn, when its brewery was contracted out to a company in Atlanta; from that point, the microbrews sold at the Ale House were produced in Atlanta
- Olde Towne Brewing Company – operating from 2004-2011 in Huntsville
- Poplar Head Mule Company – operating from 1995-2002 in Dothan
- Port City Brewery – first brewpub in Alabama, 1990s in Mobile
- Red Hills Brewery – operated from 2016-2019 in Homewood
- Salty Nut Brewery – Huntsville
- Serda Brewing Co. - Mobile
- Southside Cellar Brewing Company – operating in the mid-late 1990s in Birmingham
- Vulcan Breweries Company – operating in the late 1990s in Birmingham

== Beer regulation ==
The Code of Alabama defines beer as being fermented malt liquor containing between 0.5% alcohol by volume (ABV) and 13.9% ABV. Before 2009, beer in Alabama was limited to 6% ABV or less. The only other states with similarly low limits were Mississippi and West Virginia.

Beer, except draft or keg beer, sold by retailers must be sold or dispensed in bottles, cans or other containers not to exceed 25.4 ounces (750 ml). Prior to the passage of legislation in 2012, container size was limited to 16 ounces.

== Brewpubs ==
Brewpubs in Alabama must be located in an historic building or site, in a wet county or wet municipality, in which county beer was brewed for public consumption prior to the ratification of the Eighteenth Amendment to the U.S. Constitution in 1919.

By law, beer brewed by a brewpub cannot be possessed, sold or dispensed except on the premises where it is brewed. Brewpub beer also cannot be packaged or contained in other than barrels from which the beer is to be dispensed.

The brewpub must contain and operate a restaurant with a seating capacity of not less than 80.

== "Free The Hops" movement ==
In 2006 and 2007 a grassroots lobbying organization called "Free The Hops" introduced bills in the state House and Senate, intending to raise the limit on beer to 13.9% ABV. The bill was passed and signed into law in May 2009.

The movement to raise the ABV limit on beer in Alabama followed similar movements in Georgia, North Carolina, and South Carolina. Those states also had 5% and 6% ABV limits on beer until recently: Georgia raised its ABV limit to 14% in 2004, North Carolina raised to 15% in 2005, and South Carolina raised to 17.5% in 2007.

In May 2011, the Brewery Modernization Act was signed into Law, which allowed breweries to sell on-premises like a brewpub, or to wholesalers, or to both, and removed the crippling restrictions which prevented new breweries and brewpubs from opening.

In May 2012, the Alabama house passed Senate Bill 294, allowing the sale of beer containers up to 25.4 ounces (750 milliliters), effective August 1, 2012, into law. Governor Robert Bentley signed the bill on May 16, 2012.

In May 2013, Free the Hops supported the Alabama Homebrewers Association's home brew bill which was signed into law ending Alabama's status as the last state in the nation that banned the making of beer and wine at home.

In March 2016, Free the Hops supported the Alabama Brewers Guild's Growler Bill which was signed into law; allowing breweries to sell a small amount of product directly to the public "to go", removing some unusual location restrictions on where breweries could locate, and allowing for charitable donations to be made directly to a non-profit event. The law went into effect 1 June 2016.

== Homebrewing ==
On May 9, 2013 Alabama governor Bentley signed HB9 into law, allowing Alabama residents to legally homebrew beer. Alabama became the 49th state to legalize homebrewing. Mississippi's legislature passed a law to legalize homebrewing, however it took effect months after Alabama's law did. Alabama residents are limited to 15 gallons of production per quarter and no more than 15 gallon on premises at one time. However, residents of dry counties, dry municipalities, minors and convicted felons are still prohibited from producing homebrewed beer.

== Brewers Association ==
Formed in 2009, the Alabama Brewers Guild exists to promote the common interests of its members and the craft brewing industry in Alabama. The core membership of the guild consists of licensed Alabama breweries and brewpubs actively engaged in the brewing of craft beer at a facility located in the state of Alabama.

== See also ==
- Beer in the United States
- List of breweries in the United States
- List of microbreweries
