= Alison Lohman =

American actress (born 1979)

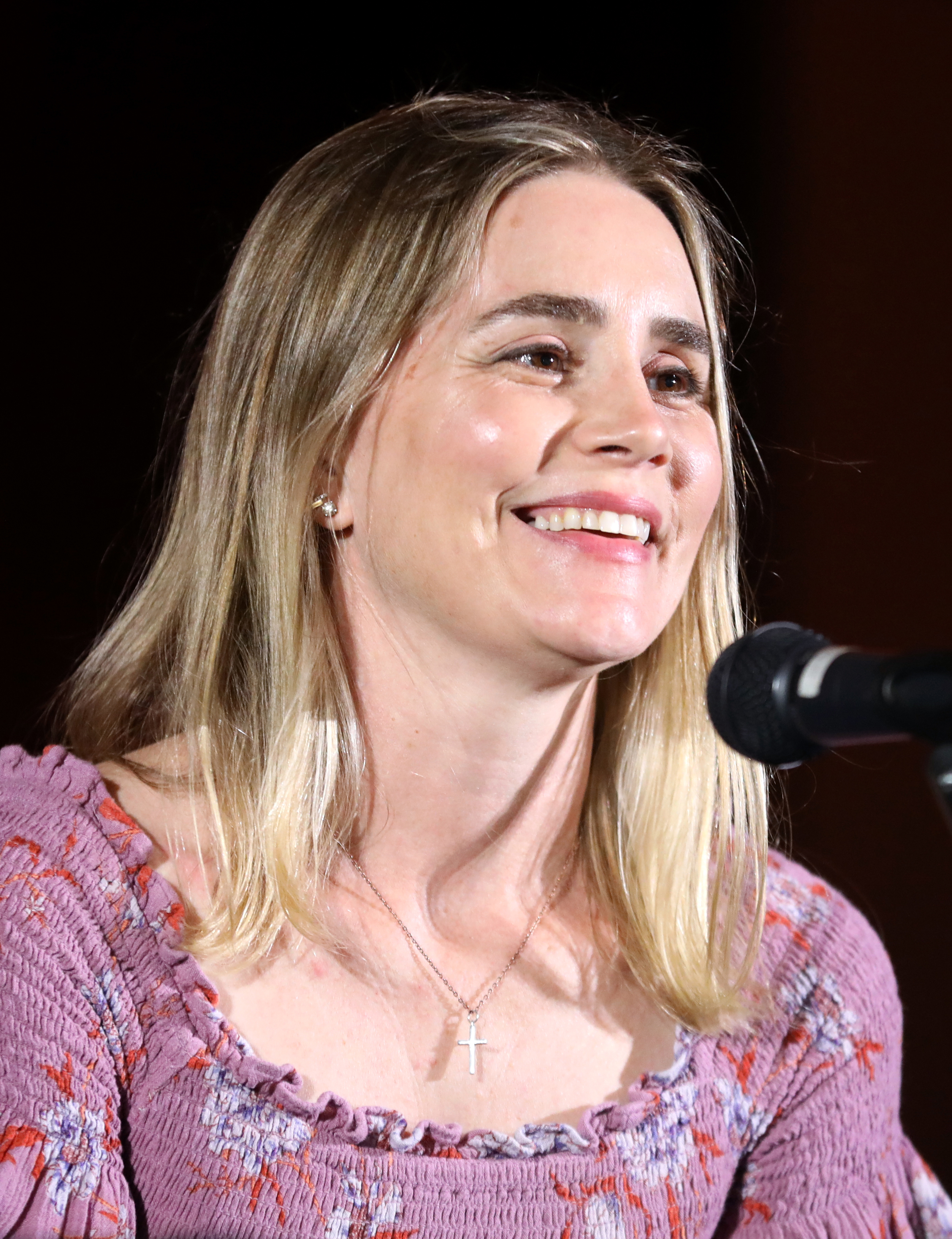
- Lohman in 2024
- Born: Alison Marion Lohman; September 18, 1979 (age 47); Palm Springs, California, U.S.
- Occupation: Actress
- Years active: 1988–2009 (Note: Brief return: 2015–2016); 2024–present
- Spouse: Mark Neveldine (m. 2009)
- Children: 3

Alison Marion Lohman (born September 18, 1979) is an American actress. She began her career with small roles in short and independent films, and starred in the sitcom Tucker (2000–2001) and the soap opera Pasadena (2001). She received critical attention for her roles in White Oleander (2002), Big Fish and Matchstick Men (both 2003), winning accolades at the Hollywood Film and Young Hollywood Awards. She also lent her voice to the 2005 redub of the animated film Nausicaä of the Valley of the Wind. After appearing in Flicka (2006), Beowulf and Things We Lost in the Fire (both 2007), her highest-grossing release came with the horror film Drag Me to Hell (2009), which earned her nominations at the Detroit Film Critics Society, MTV Movie and Saturn Awards.

In 2009, Lohman retired from acting after marrying filmmaker Mark Neveldine, choosing to focus on her personal life; she has since worked as an acting coach. However, during 2015–2016, she had small roles in three of Neveldine's films: The Vatican Tapes (2015), Urge and Officer Downe (both 2016). In 2024, Lohman returned to acting, first appearing in a commercial for Together Financial Collective.

== Early life ==
Alison Marion Lohman was born in Palm Springs, California, on September 18, 1979. She has a younger brother named Robert. She excelled in high school, obtaining top grades in all subjects except drama because she suffered from shyness. During her senior year, she won an award from the National Foundation for Advancement in the Arts. She was offered a full scholarship to attend New York University but declined, opting instead to directly pursue an acting career.

== Career ==
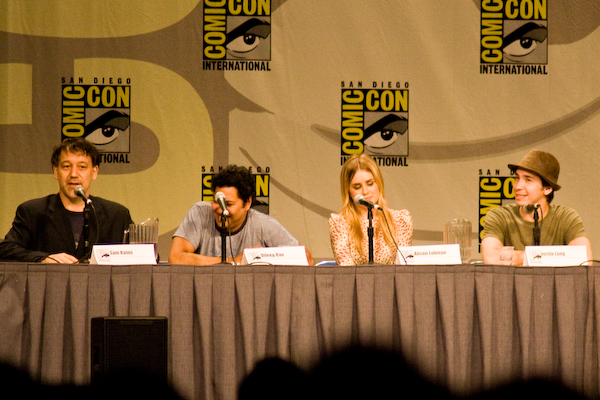
Lohman with the cast of Drag Me to Hell in 2008

At age nine, Lohman played Gretl in The Sound of Music at the Palm Desert's McCallum Theater. Two years later, she won the Desert Theater League's award for Most Outstanding Actress in a Musical for the title role in Annie. She went on to perform locally as a child singer, which included alongside Frank Sinatra at a benefit event in Palm Springs. She moved to Los Angeles in 1997 to pursue an acting career, beginning with minor roles in independent films and B movies. She was set to play a cancer patient in Tom Shadyac's 2002 film Dragonfly, for which Lohman shaved her hair. Her scenes were later removed.

Lohman was subsequently cast in White Oleander, an adaptation of Janet Fitch's novel, directed by Peter Kosminsky. Due to her previous haircut, she had to wear a wig during filming. Released in 2002, White Oleander earned positive reviews, and Lohman's performance was met with widespread acclaim. It was described as her "breakthrough role" by media sources, with the New York Times describing her work as "the year's most auspicious screen acting début". She additionally earned praise for her roles in Matchstick Men, released in 2003, and Big Fish, also released in 2003. Matchstick Men earned Lohman's performance as an adolescent con-artist acclaim over her co-star Nicolas Cage, while Big Fish saw her playing the younger version of Jessica Lange's character, for which USA Today wrote that "equally delightful is the Alison Lohman character's evolution into an older woman. It's a metamorphosis to equal any in screen history."

In 2005, Lohman appeared in Atom Egoyan's Where the Truth Lies, which originally received an NC-17 rating for its graphic sexual content, and emerged as a critical and commercial failure. Some critics felt that Lohman was miscast; however, Roger Ebert spoke positively of her performance. Her next feature of that year, The Big White, was also panned by critics. Better received was the English language dubbing of Nausicaä of the Valley of the Wind, also released in 2005, in which she voiced the titular character. Lohman beat out actress Natalie Portman for the role. The film was lauded by critics and audiences alike, and had a considerable impact on popular culture.

Lohman's next film was the drama Flicka, released in 2006. At the age of 25, she played a 14-year-old girl who befriends a wild mustang in the film. She had trained rigorously in horse-riding for the role, stating she was "constantly thrown emotionally and physically" while working with the horses for this role. She next played a recovering heroin addict in Things We Lost in the Fire, released in 2007 to mostly positive reviews.

Lohman starred in Sam Raimi's 2009 horror film Drag Me to Hell, taking the role after Elliot Page dropped out due to scheduling conflicts. Lohman enjoyed her stunts during filming, despite not being particularly fond of horror films. The film grossed $90 million worldwide, becoming her highest-grossing role and garnering praise for her performance. In his review of the film, Roger Ebert wrote that she "greatly assisted" in the film's success and labeled her a scream queen: "It is essential that the heroine be a good screamer, and man, can that Alison Lohman scream. Stanley Kubrick would have needed only a day with her on The Shining." She received nominations for the Detroit Film Critics Society Award for Best Actress, the Saturn Award for Best Actress and the MTV Movie Award for Best Scared-As-Shit Performance.

Also in 2009, Lohman had a role in the film Gamer, which was panned by critics. After the release of Gamer, Lohman retired from acting to focus on her marriage to filmmaker Mark Neveldine and her desire to focus on raising their three children. She has since taught online acting classes and had small roles in three of Neveldine's films released between 2015 and 2016. In 2024, Lohman returned to acting, first appearing in a commercial for Together Financial Collective.

== Personal life ==
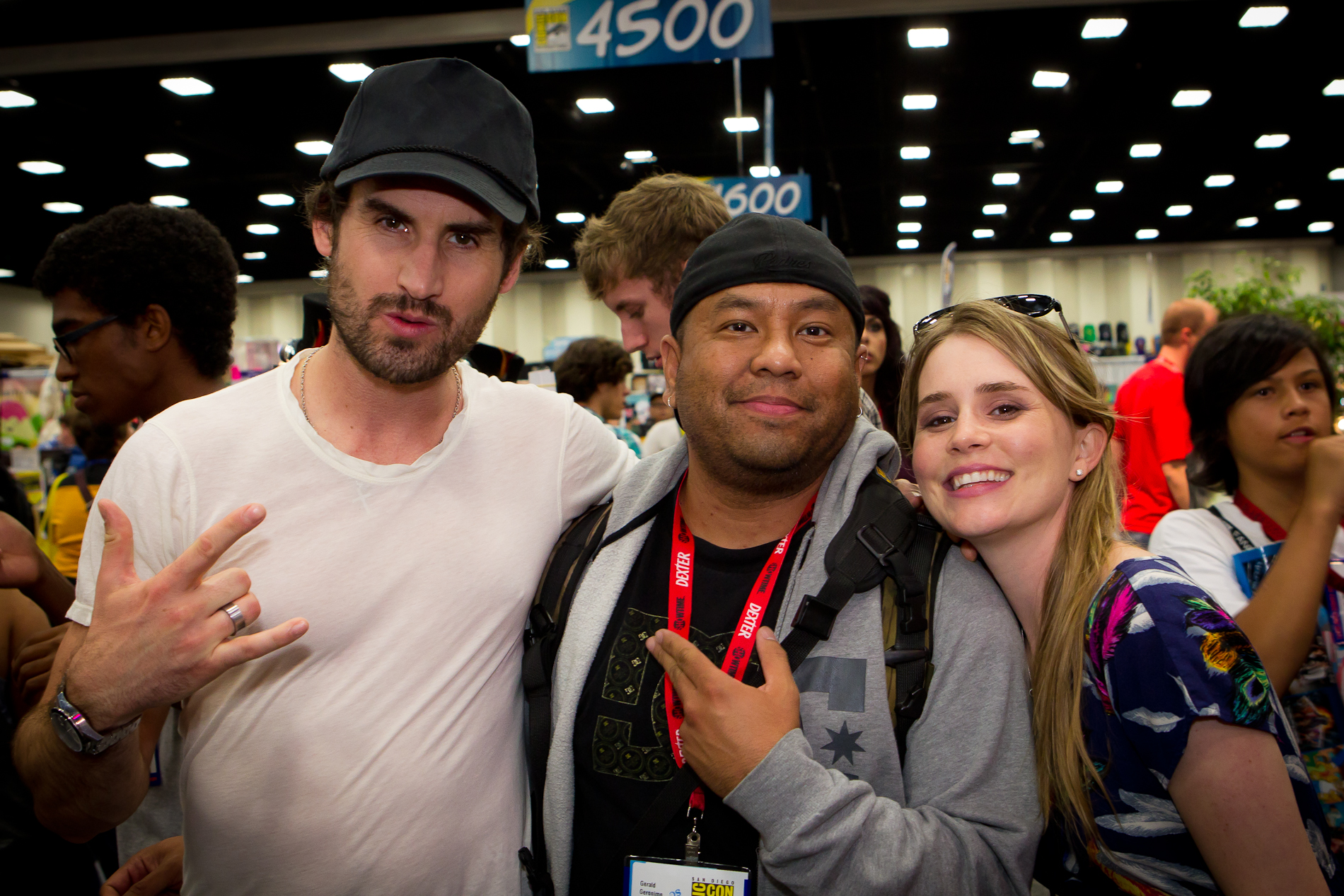
Lohman and her husband, Mark Neveldine (left), with a fan in 2011

In 2009, when she was 29, Lohman married filmmaker Mark Neveldine at St. Anthony's Catholic Church in Watertown, New York. They have three children. She endorsed Donald Trump in the 2024 United States presidential election.

== Acting credits ==
=== Film ===
Year	Title	Role	Notes
1998	Kraa! The Sea Monster	Curtis	
1999	Planet Patrol	Patrolman Curtis	
1999	The Auteur Theory	Teen Rosemary	
1999	The Thirteenth Floor	Honey Bear Girl	
2000	Sharing the Secret	Beth Moss	
2000	The Million Dollar Kid	Courtney Hunter	
2001	Alex in Wonder	Camelia	
2001	Delivering Milo	Ms. Madeline	
2002	Dragonfly	Cancer patient	Scenes deleted
2002	White Oleander	Astrid Magnussen	
2002	White Boy	Amy	
2003	Big Fish	Sandra Bloom (young), née Templeton	
2003	Matchstick Men	Angela	
2005	Nausicaä of the Valley of the Wind	Nausicaä	Voice role; English dub
2005	The Big White	Tiffany	
2005	Where the Truth Lies	Karen O'Connor	
2006	Delirious	K'harma Leeds	
2006	Flicka	Katy McLaughlin	
2007	Beowulf	Ursula	
2007	Things We Lost in the Fire	Kelly	
2009	Drag Me to Hell	Christine Brown	
2009	Gamer	Trace	
2015	The Vatican Tapes	Psych Patient	
2016	Urge	Mother	
2016	Officer Downe	Sister Blister	

=== Television ===
Year	Title	Role	Notes
1998	Pacific Blue	Molly	Episode: "Seduced"
1998	7th Heaven	Barbara	Episode: "Let's Talk About Sex"
1999	Crusade	Claire	Episode: "The Long Road"
1999	Safe Harbor	Hayley	Recurring role; 4 episodes
2000	Sharing the Secret	Beth Moss	Television film
2000–2001	Tucker	McKenna Reid	Main role
2001	Pasadena	Lily McAllister	Main role

=== Stage ===
Year	Title	Role	Notes
1988	The Sound of Music	Gretl	
1990	Annie	Annie	

== Awards and nominations ==
Year	Award	Category	Work	Result
1991	Desert Theater League	Most Outstanding Actress in a Musical	Annie	Won
1997	National YoungArts Foundation	Advancement in the Arts	Herself	Won
2003	Golden Schmoes Awards	Best Supporting Actress of the Year	Matchstick Men	Nominated
2003	Hollywood Film Awards	Best Supporting Actress	Matchstick Men	Won
2003	Phoenix Film Critics Society Awards	Best Newcomer	White Oleander	Nominated
2003	ShoWest Awards	Female Star of Tomorrow	White Oleander	Won
2003	Young Hollywood Awards	Best Superstar	White Oleander	Won
2004	Central Ohio Film Critics Association	Best Supporting Actress	Matchstick Men	Nominated
2009	Detroit Film Critics Society Awards	Best Actress	Drag Me to Hell	Nominated
2009	Fright Meter Awards	Best Actress	Drag Me to Hell	Nominated
2009	Scream Awards	Best Horror Actress	Drag Me to Hell	Nominated
2009	Scream Awards	Fight Scene of the Year	Drag Me to Hell	Nominated
2010	Saturn Awards	Best Actress	Drag Me to Hell	Nominated
2010	MTV Movie & TV Awards	Best Scared-As-Shit Performance	Drag Me to Hell	Nominated
