= Grant Elementary School =

There are a number of Elementary schools named Grant Elementary School:

- Grant Elementary School (Tacoma, Washington)
- Grant Elementary School (Eureka, California)
- Grant Elementary School (Petaluma, California)
- Grant Elementary School (San Diego, California)
- Grant Elementary School (Santa Ana, California)
- Grant Elementary School (Santa Monica, California)
- Grant Elementary School (Muscatine, Iowa)
- Grant Elementary School (Columbia, Missouri)
- Grant Elementary School (Murray, Utah)
