= Amber Tamblyn =

American actress and author (born 1983)

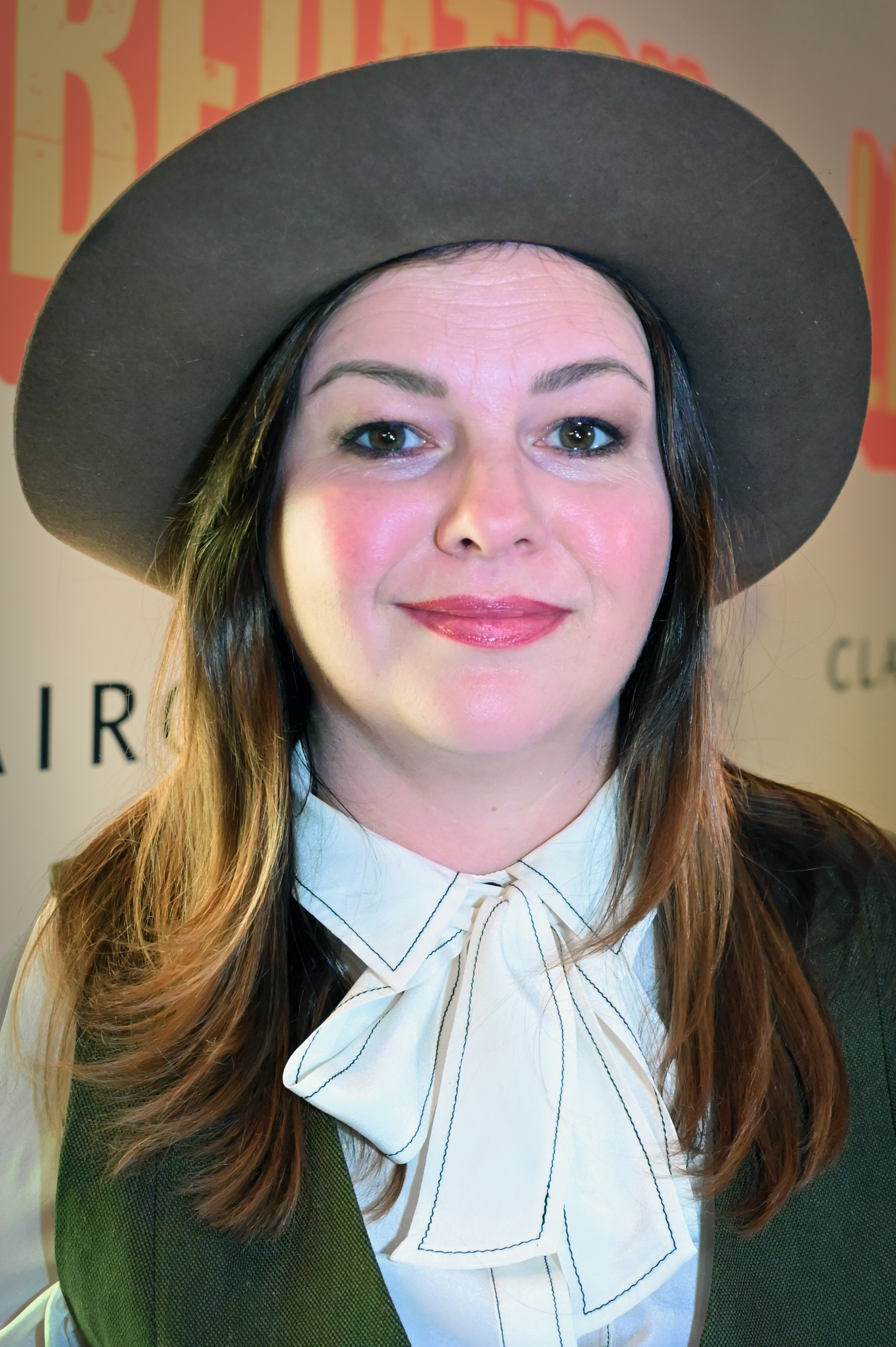
- Tamblyn in 2025
- Born: Amber Rose Tamblyn; May 14, 1983 (age 43); Santa Monica, California, U.S.
- Occupations: Actress; author
- Years active: 1995–present
- Spouse: David Cross (m. 2012)
- Children: 1
- Father: Russ Tamblyn
- Relatives: Eddie Tamblyn (grandfather)
- Website: amtam.com

Amber Rose Tamblyn (born May 14, 1983) is an American actress and author. She first came to national attention at the age of 11 for her role as Emily Quartermaine on the soap opera General Hospital. From 2003 to 2005 she starred in the prime-time series Joan of Arcadia, portraying the title character, Joan Girardi, for which she received Primetime Emmy and Golden Globe nominations. Her feature film work includes roles such as Tibby Rollins from the first two The Sisterhood of the Traveling Pants films and Megan McBride in 127 Hours (2010), as well as appearing opposite Tilda Swinton in Stephanie Daley, which debuted at The Sundance Film Festival and for which Tamblyn won Best Actress at The Locarno International Film Festival and was nominated for an Independent Spirit Award. In 2016, she made her directorial debut with the film Paint It Black starring Alia Shawkat, based on Janet Fitch's 2006 novel of the same name. In 2021, she starred opposite Diane Lane in FX's Y: The Last Man.

Tamblyn is a published author and cultural critic at large. She has published seven books across genres, and writes for The New York Times and other publications on issues of gender inequality and women's suffrage.

== Early life ==
Amber Tamblyn is the daughter of singer/artist Bonnie Tamblyn and actor Russ Tamblyn. Her paternal grandfather, Eddie Tamblyn, was a vaudeville performer. Her uncle was Larry Tamblyn, the keyboardist in the rock band The Standells. She attended the Santa Monica Alternative School House. At age ten, she played Pippi Longstocking in a school play; her father's agent, Sharon Debord, was attending as a family friend and convinced her father to allow Tamblyn to go on auditions.

== Career ==
=== Television ===
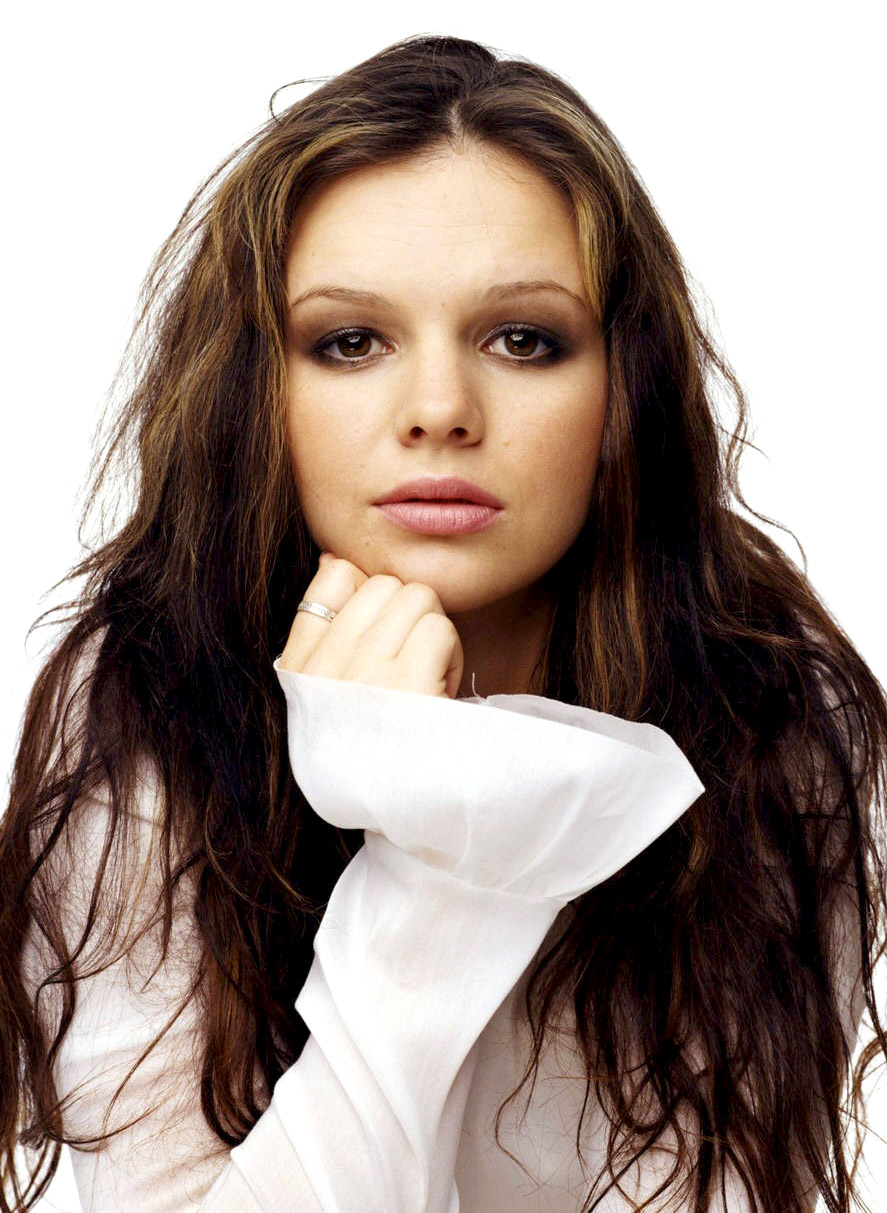
Tamblyn posing in 2004

Tamblyn's first TV role was Emily Bowen (later known as Emily Quartermaine) on the soap opera General Hospital, a role she played for six years (from 1995 to 2001). She also starred in "Evergreen", the pilot episode of the second The Twilight Zone revival in 2002. Tamblyn became better known playing Joan Girardi, a teenage girl who receives frequent visits from God, on the CBS drama series Joan of Arcadia. Tamblyn's father made several appearances as God in the form of a dog walker on the show, which ran from 2003 to 2005.

Early guest-starring roles include Buffy the Vampire Slayer (playing Janice Penshaw, the best friend of Michelle Trachtenberg's character Dawn Summers), Boston Public, CSI: Miami, and Punk'd, where Ashton Kutcher and his crew members tricked her into losing someone else's dog. In 2007, she starred in the pilot for Babylon Fields, an apocalyptic comedic drama about the undead trying to resume their former lives. CBS excluded the show from its fall programming lineup, since it would have competed with the network's other undead-themed drama, Moonlight.

In 2009, Tamblyn starred in The Unusuals as NYPD homicide detective Casey Shraeger. The show was canceled after its first season. The same year, she had a recurring role alongside her future husband David Cross in the IFC sitcom The Increasingly Poor Decisions of Todd Margaret.

From November 2010 to April 2011, she starred as medical student Martha M. Masters in the seventh season of the Fox medical drama series House. She returned for the series finale in 2012.

In August 2013, Tamblyn was cast as Charlie Harper (Charlie Sheen)'s long-lost (and previously unknown) lesbian daughter, Jenny Harper, on the sitcom Two and a Half Men, opposite Ashton Kutcher and Jon Cryer. Her first appearance was on the season 11 opener, September 26, 2013.

She has appeared on numerous episodes of Comedy Central's Inside Amy Schumer. She has also guest starred on IFC's Portlandia and Comedy Bang! Bang!, as well as numerous shows on Adult Swim, including The Heart, She Holler and Metalocalypse.

In 2021, Tamblyn starred opposite Diane Lane in the critically acclaimed FX television series Y: The Last Man, based on the graphic novel.

=== Films ===
Tamblyn launched her film career playing bit parts in her father's movies Rebellious and Johnny Mysto: Boy Wizard. She also appeared in 1995's Live Nude Girls. Her first major film role was in 2005's The Sisterhood of the Traveling Pants as Tibby Rollins, co-starring Alexis Bledel, America Ferrera, and Blake Lively. She reprised the role in the 2008 sequel, The Sisterhood of the Traveling Pants 2.

Her horror film career began with the opening scene of 2002's The Ring. Tamblyn also appeared in the Japan-set The Grudge 2. The film, which co-stars Sarah Michelle Gellar, was released on October 13, 2006, and debuted in the #1 spot at the North American box office. In August 2010, she won the Bronze Leopard at the Locarno International Film Festival for her performance in the title role of Stephanie Daley. The film, which also won an award at the 2006 Sundance Film Festival, features Tamblyn as a 16-year-old who kills her baby moments after giving birth in the bathroom of a ski resort. She was also nominated for Best Supporting Actress at the 22nd Independent Spirit Awards. The film co-stars Tilda Swinton and Timothy Hutton.

In January 2008, Tamblyn appeared in the Hallmark film The Russell Girl, as Sarah Russell, a woman suffering from disease and mental anguish. Also in 2008, she starred in Blackout. She appeared in the 2009 film Spring Breakdown, also featuring Amy Poehler, Rachel Dratch, and Parker Posey. Tamblyn appeared alongside Orlando Bloom, Colin Firth, and Patricia Clarkson in the 2010 film Main Street, a drama set in North Carolina. That year, she also had a role in the drama 127 Hours, with James Franco.

In 2012, Tamblyn starred alongside Wes Bentley and Vincent Piazza in the indie feature 3 Nights in the Desert directed by Gabriel Cowan, written by playwright Adam Chanzit and produced by John Suits. In 2015, she starred opposite Bob Odenkirk in the Netflix original film Girlfriend's Day. The same year, Tamblyn made a cameo appearance with her father Russ in the Spaghetti Western Django Unchained.

In 2016, she made her directorial debut with the film Paint It Black starring Alia Shawkat and based on Janet Fitch's 2006 novel of the same name. Tamblyn optioned the rights to the book in 2012 with the idea of producing the movie and starring as the lead character with Courtney Hunt directing. By 2014 Tamblyn had taken on writing and directing duties herself and had cast Shawkat in the lead role. Filming was completed in December 2014. Rotten Tomatoes has given it a 88% rating based on reviews from 25 critics.

=== Theater ===
Tamblyn attended a grade school for the theatrical arts from age 5 to 14. She was discovered as an actress at age 9 when she starred in Pippi Longstocking. In 2014, she originated the role of Daisy Domergue for the live reading at the Ace Theater in Los Angeles of Quentin Tarantino's The Hateful Eight. She was hand picked by Tarantino, a longtime friend, along with fellow cast members Samuel L. Jackson, Kurt Russell, and others. Tamblyn starred in Neil LaBute's Reasons to Be Pretty at the Geffen Playhouse in 2014, which received critical acclaim.

Tamblyn serves on the board of directors for Soho Rep Theater in New York.

=== Writings ===
In 2005, Simon & Schuster Children's Publishing published her debut book of poems, Free Stallion, written between the ages of 11 and 21. The School Library Journal wrote, "Free Stallion is a compilation of poetry that amounts to a portrait of the artist as a teenager... Many of the selections are appropriately self-absorbed but move beyond journalistic catharsis to real insight and stunning language for one so young." Poet Laureate Lawrence Ferlinghetti called the book "A fine, fruitful gestation of throbbingly nascent sexuality, awakened in young new language." In 2008, she was featured in the Write Bloody Publishing anthology The Last American Valentine: Illustrated Poems to Seduce and Destroy.

In 2009, Manic D. Press published her second collection of poetry, Bang Ditto.

In 2015, HarperCollins published her third collection, Dark Sparkler, a hybrid of poetry and art that explores the lives and deaths of child star actresses. A critical success and bestseller, the book features original art by Marilyn Manson, David Lynch, Marcel Dzama, and Adrian Tomine. For its publication launch, Tamblyn and the band Yo La Tengo created an hour-long poetry and music show incorporating poems from the book. They performed the show in New York at Housing Works and in Los Angeles at the Hollywood Forever Cemetery.

In 2019, Penguin Random House published Era of Ignition; Coming of Age in a Time of Rage and Revolution, a collection of her cultural criticism and memoir essays. The book is a personal exploration of feminism during divisive times.

Tamblyn has self-published two chapbooks of poetry, Of the Dawn and Plenty of Ships, and has participated in poetry readings at various venues, particularly in California. The Loneliest, a poem book inspired by Thelonious Monk and his music, was published in 2005 and contains haiku poetry by Tamblyn coupled with collages by George Herms.

Tamblyn appeared in a poetry concert film recorded on August 4, 2002, in Los Angeles, The Drums Inside Your Chest. Beginning in 2009, she began blogging for the Poetry Foundation's blog, Harriet. Her poem "Bridgette Anderson" was one of the poems featured in Saul Williams's book Chorus, published by MTV Books in 2011.

In 2007, she co-founded Write Now Poetry Society, dedicated to creating unique and quality poetry programming. The nonprofit has a long history with The Getty Museum, curating poetry events in conjunction with art openings, such as 2011's Dark Blushing, featuring new poems commissioned by poets Patricia Smith and NEA fellow Jeffrey McDaniel based on artwork by Dante Gabriel Rossetti and William Blake. Since 2011, Tamblyn has reviewed books of poetry by women for the feminist magazine BUST.

=== James Woods allegation and Hasidic incident ===
In a series of September 2017 tweets later reiterated in an open letter published in Teen Vogue, Tamblyn said that actor James Woods tried to seduce her and a friend at a restaurant and offered to take them to Las Vegas when she and her friend were 16. Woods denied her allegations, calling them a "lie". Tamblyn later wrote an essay for The New York Times in which she said that Woods's "accusation that I was lying sent me back to that day in that producer's office, and back to all the days I've spent in the offices of men; of feeling unsure, uneasy, questioned and disbelieved, no matter the conversation."

In March 2018, Tamblyn was criticized for tweets about New York City's Hasidic Jewish community after an incident in Brooklyn involving her daughter. Tamblyn said she was nearly struck by a van driven by a Hasidic Jewish man while walking with her daughter in a stroller. She said "this is not the first time a man from the Hasidic community in NYC has attempted to harm me or other women I know. Any woman riding a bike through South Williamsburg can attest. I hope this guy is caught." In Tablet, journalist Liel Leibovitz chided Tamblyn for "speaking so hurtfully about an entire community of underprivileged people". Tamblyn denied accusations of antisemitism.

== Personal life ==
Tamblyn and actor-comedian David Cross became engaged in August 2011, and married on October 6, 2012. On February 21, 2017, Tamblyn announced that she and Cross had recently had a daughter.

She is sometimes said to be the goddaughter of musician Neil Young and actors Dean Stockwell and Dennis Hopper, although in a 2009 interview with Parade, Tamblyn explained that "godfather" was "just a loose term" for Stockwell, Hopper, and Young, three friends of her father's who were always around the house when she was growing up and were big influences on her.

She was the writing mentee of the late San Francisco Poet Laureate Jack Hirschman.

=== Politics ===
Tamblyn supported and campaigned for Hillary Clinton during the 2016 United States presidential election. On social media, she urged voters to check voter ID requirements, citing VoteRiders as a source of assistance.

She is one of the founders of the nonprofit organization Time's Up, which was created to combat workplace sexual harassment.

In October 2023, Tamblyn signed the Artists4Ceasefire open letter to President Joe Biden, calling for a ceasefire between Israel and Gaza.

In September 2025, Tamblyn was criticized for her comments on Bluesky in response to the assassination of Charlie Kirk. Referring to the Newsweek article "Trump Ally Charlie Kirk Suggests Children Should Watch Public Executions", she responded with "Wish Granted".

=== Relationship with parents ===
In June 2021, Tamblyn wrote an essay in The New York Times expressing solidarity with Britney Spears's effort to end the conservatorship controlling her life. Tamblyn wrote that she became financially successful when she turned 21 and starred in Joan of Arcadia, after which her father became her co-manager and her mother her business manager. She wrote that having her parents on the payroll damaged their relationship, and that her money "paid for our vacations, dinners out, and sometimes even the bills. When it finally came time to disentangle our personal and professional relationships, it was deeply painful for all three of us". But Tamblyn wrote that she, unlike Spears, "had a healthy and loving relationship with my parents, for the most part" and her parents "were supportive and ethical in every way". When the "circle of those I supported opened up to include extended family members and friends. I was the one they came to for a small loan or in an emergency, the one who always picked up the check", "using money to make people happy, or fix problems, or appease my guilt", she recounted that she felt like "everybody's ATM: a bank that was, nonetheless, unconditionally loved".

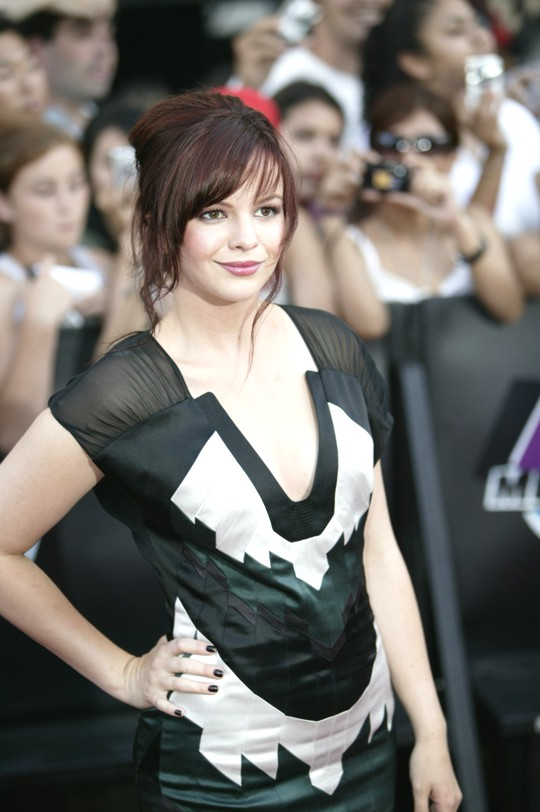
Tamblyn at the MuchMusic Video Awards red carpet, June 17, 2007

== Filmography ==
=== Film ===
Year	Title	Role	Notes
1995	Live Nude Girls	Young Jill	
1995	Rebellious	Deb	
1997	Johnny Mysto: Boy Wizard	Sprout	
2002	The Ring	Katie Embry	
2002	Ten Minutes Older: The Trumpet	Kate	Segment: "Twelve Miles to Trona"
2005	The Sisterhood of the Traveling Pants	Tibby Rollins	
2006	Stephanie Daley	Stephanie Daley	
2006	The Grudge 2	Aubrey Davis	
2007	Spiral	Amber	
2007	Normal Adolescent Behavior	Wendy Bergman	
2008	One Fast Move or I'm Gone: Kerouac's Big Sur	Herself	Documentary
2008	Blackout	Claudia	
2008	The Sisterhood of the Traveling Pants 2	Tibby Rollins	
2009	Spring Breakdown	Ashley Hartmann	
2009	Beyond a Reasonable Doubt	Ella Crystal	
2010	127 Hours	Megan McBride	
2010	Main Street	Mary Saunders	
2012	Django Unchained	Daughter of Son of a Gunfighter	
2014	3 Nights in the Desert	Anna	
2014	X/Y	Stacey	
2014	Growing Up and Other Lies	Tabatha	
2015	The Heyday of the Insensitive Bastards	Amanda	
2016	Paint It Black	—N/a	Director and co-writer
2017	Girlfriend's Day	Jill	
2018	Nostalgia	Bethany Ashemore	
2023	You Hurt My Feelings	Carolyn	

=== Television ===
Year	Title	Role	Notes
1995–2001	General Hospital	Emily Quartermaine	Main cast (61 episodes)
2001	Buffy the Vampire Slayer	Janice Penshaw	Episode: "All the Way"
2002	Boston Public	Melissa Campbell	Episode: "Chapter Thirty-Two"
2002	The Twilight Zone	Jenna Winslow	Episode: "Evergreen"
2002	CSI: Miami	Senior Cadet Valerie Barreiro	Episode: "Camp Fear"
2003	Without a Trace	Clare Metcalfe	Episode: "Clare de Lune"
2003–2005	Joan of Arcadia	Joan Girardi	Title role (45 episodes)
2005	I'm Still Here: Real Diaries of Young People Who Lived Through the Holocaust	Elizabeth Kaugmann/Miriam Korber (voice)	TV special
2005	Mad TV	Herself	Episode: "10.23"
2007	Babylon Fields	Janine Wunch	Pilot
2008	The Russell Girl	Sarah Russell	TV movie
2009	The Unusuals	Detective Casey Shraeger	Main cast (10 episodes)
2009	Comedy Showcase	Stephanie Daley	Episode: "The Increasingly Poor Decisions of Todd Margaret"
2010–2012	House	Martha M. Masters	Main cast (15 episodes)
2010–2016	The Increasingly Poor Decisions of Todd Margaret	Stephanie Daley	6 episodes
2012	Portlandia	Bookstore Intern	Episode: "Cat Nap"
2012	Metalocalypse	Trindle (voice)	Episode: "Fanklok"
2013	The Heart, She Holler	Hurlette Headhe	Episode: "The Dearranged Marriage"
2013–2015	Two and a Half Men	Jenny Harper	Main cast (24 episodes)
2013–2016	Inside Amy Schumer	Various Roles	8 episodes
2014	Community	Thought Jacker co-star	Episode: "Basic Sandwich", uncredited
2014	Comedy Bang! Bang!	Herself	Episode: "Amber Tamblyn Wears a Leather Jacket & Black Booties"
2016	Lip Sync Battle	Herself	Episode: "America Ferrera vs. Amber Tamblyn"
2018	Drunk History	Margaret Sanger	Episode: "Sex"
2019	Helpsters	Paleontologist Paloma	Episode: "Wayne of Wonder/Paleontologist Paloma"
2021	Y: The Last Man	Kimberly Cunningham Campbell	Main cast (10 episodes)

=== Music videos ===
Year	Title	Artist(s)	Ref.
2020	"Eat It (We're All In This Together)"	David Cross featuring "Weird Al" Yankovic	

== Bibliography ==
- Free Stallion: Poems New York: Simon & Schuster Children, 2004. ISBN 9781442430877 OCLC 936344520
- Bang Ditto San Francisco: Manic D Press, 2009. ISBN 9781933149349, OCLC 489637541
- Dark Sparkler New York: Harper Perennial, 2015. ISBN 9780062348166 OCLC 902669942
- "The Punishment Gift" New York: Bottle of Smoke Press, Limited Edition
- Any Man New York: Harper Perennial, 2018. ISBN 9780062688927, OCLC 1084609332
- Era of ignition, New York: Crown Archetype, 2019. ISBN 9781984822987, OCLC 1088661698
- "Listening in the Dark" Fall 2022, HarperCollins

== Discography ==
Year	Album	Artist	Track	Role
2012	Payback	Danny!	"Evil"	Vocals
2013	Event 2	Deltron 3030	"Lawnchair Quarterback Part 1" "Lawnchair Quarterback Part 2"	Spoken word

== Awards and nominations ==
Tamblyn's portrayal of Joan Girardi earned her both Golden Globe Award and Primetime Emmy Award nominations in 2004. She was also nominated for a Saturn Award for Best Actress in a Television Series in 2004 and 2005.

Year	Association	Category	Nominated work	Results	Ref
1999	YoungStar Awards	Best Performance by a Young Actress in a Daytime TV Program	General Hospital	Won	
2000	YoungStar Awards	Best Performance by a Young Actress in a Daytime TV Program	General Hospital	Won	
2000	Soap Opera Digest Awards	Favorite Teen Star	General Hospital	Nominated	
2001	Soap Opera Digest Awards	Outstanding Younger Teen Actress	General Hospital	Nominated	
2003	Online Film & Television Association	Best Actress in a Drama Series	Joan of Arcadia	Nominated	
2004	Online Film & Television Association	Best Actress in a Drama Series	Joan of Arcadia	Nominated	
2004	Gold Derby Awards	Drama Lead Actress	Joan of Arcadia	Won	
2004	Golden Globes	Best Performance by an Actress in a Television Series — Drama	Joan of Arcadia	Nominated	
2004	Primetime Emmy Awards	Outstanding Lead Actress in a Drama Series ("Pilot")	Joan of Arcadia	Nominated	
2004	Satellite Awards	Best Actress in a Drama Series	Joan of Arcadia	Nominated	
2004	Saturn Awards	Best Actress on Television	Joan of Arcadia	Won	
2004	Teen Choice Awards	Choice Breakout TV Star – Female	Joan of Arcadia	Nominated	
2004	Teen Choice Awards	Choice TV Actress: Drama/Action-Adventure	Joan of Arcadia	Nominated	
2004	Young Artist Awards	Best Young Adult Performer in a Teenage Role	Joan of Arcadia	Nominated	
2005	Satellite Awards	Best Actress in a Drama Series	Joan of Arcadia	Nominated	
2005	Saturn Awards	Best Actress on Television	Joan of Arcadia	Nominated	
2005	Teen Choice Awards	Choice "It" Girl	—N/a	Nominated	
2005	Teen Choice Awards	Choice Movie Actress: Drama	The Sisterhood of the Traveling Pants	Nominated	
2006	Locarno International Film Festival	Best Actress	Stephanie Daley	Won	
2007	Independent Spirit Awards	Best Supporting Female	Stephanie Daley	Nominated	
2007	Teen Choice Awards	Choice Horror Movie Actress: Horror/Thriller	The Grudge 2	Nominated	
2016	Los Angeles Film Festival	Best Film	Paint It Black	Nominated	
