= Painted Black =

Painted Black may refer to:

== Music ==
- "Paint It Black", the actual title of a commonly-misheard Rolling Stones song
- Painted Black, a Portuguese heavy-metal band
- "Painted Black", a psychedelic song by Doldrums
- "Painted Black", a goth song by Mephisto Walz
- Painted Black, an electronic album by Klangkarussell

== Literature ==
- Painted Black (book), a 1990 book on Satanism by Carl Raschke
- Painted Black, a 2015 "Dust Bin Bob" novel (after Rubber Soul) by Greg Kihn

== Other ==
- Painted Black, a stallion ridden by equestrians Hans Peter Minderhoud and Anky van Grunsven
- Painted Black, a dark stout beer by Fairhope Brewing Company
