= The Big White =

2005 film by Mark Mylod

- Promotional poster for The Big White
- Directed by: Mark Mylod
- Written by: Collin Friesen
- Produced by: Christopher Eberts; David Faigenblum; Chris Roberts
- Starring: Robin Williams; Holly Hunter; Giovanni Ribisi; Alison Lohman; Tim Blake Nelson; Woody Harrelson
- Cinematography: James Glennon
- Edited by: Julie Monroe
- Music by: Mark Mothersbaugh
- Production companies: Capitol Films; VIP Medienfonds 2 Ascendant
- Distributed by: Capitol Films
- Release date: 3 December 2005
- Running time: 105 min.
- Countries: Canada; New Zealand
- Language: English
- Budget: $15 million

The Big White is a 2005 black comedy film directed by Mark Mylod and starring Robin Williams, Holly Hunter, Giovanni Ribisi, Woody Harrelson, Tim Blake Nelson, W. Earl Brown, and Alison Lohman.

== Plot ==
Travel agent Paul Barnell finds a body in a dumpster that, unbeknownst to him, was left there by professional hitmen. Heavily in debt and attempting to find a cure for his wife Margaret's apparent Tourette syndrome, he stages a disfiguring animal attack of the body to cash in his missing brother's life-insurance policy, for which a corpse is required.

Local police are convinced that the corpse is Raymond Barnell, but promotion-hungry insurance agent Ted Waters is not. The hitmen who dumped the body are also in search of the corpse for proof to collect their payment. They take Margaret hostage to ensure that they will get the body. Meanwhile, Ted is having problems with his girlfriend Tiffany, who he neglects as he works his way up in his firm.

Paul's missing brother Raymond returns home, beats him up, and demands a portion of the insurance money. By suggesting that Ted assaulted him, Paul speeds up the delivery of the million dollar insurance payment. He has the body exhumed and agrees to exchange it and a portion of the money for Margaret. Fearing that Raymond will attempt to kill Margaret to keep her quiet, Paul considers killing his brother in his sleep, but he cannot bring himself to do so.

The next morning, Paul leaves his brother asleep and meets the hitmen for the exchange. Raymond is angered at his brother's deception and arrives as well, and is told by the insurance agent, who has finally pieced together what has happened, about Paul's million dollar policy. Raymond pulls out a pistol and shoots Margaret in the back as she flees. He is in turn shot in the stomach by one of the hitmen.

Paul runs to Margaret and finds her alive; he had hidden the insurance money in her jacket, and it stopped the bullet. The brothers say goodbye as Raymond dies. Paul tells Ted that he committed fraud only out of love for his wife, which appeals to Ted's renewed feelings for Tiffany. Touched, he lets them go. Using the money, Paul takes Margaret on a tropical vacation.

== Cast ==
- Robin Williams as Paul Barnell
- Holly Hunter as Margaret Barnell
- Giovanni Ribisi as Ted Waters
- Tim Blake Nelson as Gary
- W. Earl Brown as Jimbo
- Woody Harrelson as Raymond Barnell
- Alison Lohman as Tiffany
- Billy Merasty as Cam (as William Merasty)
- Marina Stephenson Kerr as Avis
- Ralph Alderman as Mr. Branch
- Frank Adamson as Detective
- Andrea Shawcross as Hair Stylist
- Ryan Miranda as Korean-am Teenager
- Craig March as Howard
- Ty Wood as Paperboy

== Production ==
According to one insider, it was Collin Friesen's script that "drew the talent needed to get the production off the ground". Production was based in Winnipeg, although it was filmed in Yukon. The film had a $1 million impact on the territory's economy, including the employment of 200 Yukoners. Most of the outdoor scenes and cinematography were shot at the summit of White Pass along the border of Alaska and British Columbia. The bulk of the film was shot in April 2004.

== Reception ==
On review aggregate website Rotten Tomatoes, the film has an approval rating of 30%, based on reviews from 10 critics.

In November 2005, Variety, after seeing the film at the AFI Fest in Los Angeles, called it "snowed under by misjudgment on every level", with "frigid" commercial prospects.

In March 2006, David Mattin of the BBC gave it three stars out of five, saying that the film "wants to be a cross between small-screen hits Northern Exposure and Frasier" but "can't resist the lure of cheap and obvious one-liners". Mattin called Williams's performance "typically slushy and ultimately likeable" and Ribisi's performance one that "really shines", but noted that the viewer is mostly subjected to "limp gags based on [Hunter]'s compulsive swearing, and Harrelson's cliché-ridden small-town hick stupidity".
