= Blackout (2008 American film) =

- Theatrical release poster
- Directed by: Rigoberto Castañeda
- Written by: Ed Dougherty
- Produced by: Valerio Morabito
- Starring: Amber Tamblyn; Aidan Gillen; Armie Hammer; Katie Stuart
- Cinematography: Alejandro Martínez
- Edited by: Jorge Macaya
- Music by: Reinhold Heil; Johnny Klimek
- Distributed by: Capitol Films
- Release date: May 29, 2008 (Russia)
- Running time: 85 minutes
- Country: United States
- Language: English
- Box office: $296,411 (Russia)

Blackout is a 2008 psychological thriller film directed by Rigoberto Castañeda and starring Amber Tamblyn, Aidan Gillen, Armie Hammer, and Katie Stuart. It is based on the novel of the same name by Italian novelist Gianluca Morozzi, although the plot of the film deviates heavily from the source material. The plot is about three people, one of whom is a serial killer, who are trapped in an elevator after a power blackout.

== Plot ==
During a citywide power outage, three strangers—Karl, Tommy, and Claudia—are trapped in a stalled elevator. Karl, a photographer and physician, seems tense and evasive. Tommy, a volatile young man, bristles when Karl takes his picture and soon begins arguing with Claudia, a student who enters the elevator covered in blood after leaving a hospital. Claudia notices the elevator making unusual noises before it stops between floors.

In flashbacks, Karl visits his wife’s grave with his young daughter and sister-in-law, then asks his sister-in-law to watch the child while he “takes care of something.” The night before, Karl photographed a woman, bought her a drink, and brought her back to his apartment. Claudia’s flashbacks show her living with her grandmother, who urges her to relax and enjoy life. Earlier that day, Claudia and her grandmother leave the building as a homeless man asks Claudia for money; her grandmother keeps walking and is struck by a car offscreen. Claudia later visits her in the hospital and leaves shaken and bloodied.

Inside the elevator, Tommy pulls out a butterfly knife and wedges the doors open for ventilation. He decides to climb out through the ceiling hatch and up the shaft to look for help. As he climbs, Karl admits he needs to get back to his apartment before his daughter arrives. Tommy loses his grip and crashes back onto the elevator car, breaking his leg and jolting the elevator into a sudden drop of several floors. Claudia suffers an asthma flare and uses her inhaler, while Karl reluctantly treats Tommy’s leg.

Fear turns into suspicion. Claudia reveals she has a bottle of water, and Karl accuses her of hiding supplies. Around 4:00 a.m., the three shout for help. Tommy’s flashbacks reveal he is a former drug addict who recently fought with his girlfriend’s alcoholic father and urged his girlfriend to run away with him. When Tommy does not show up, she comes looking for him, tries the elevator, then takes the stairs. She hears muffled fighting but cannot determine where it is coming from and eventually leaves.

Claudia’s flashbacks reveal why she returned to the building: her grandmother, dying in the hospital, asked Claudia to bring her a photograph of her late husband. Karl grows increasingly unstable and controlling. He smokes despite Claudia’s protests and, when Claudia produces a candy bar, Karl steals her inhaler and forces her to trade for it—then keeps the inhaler anyway. He asserts dominance by worsening Tommy’s injury and declaring himself the leader.

Karl’s flashbacks reveal the truth about the woman he brought home: he tortured, raped, and killed her, leaving her body in his apartment. He panics that his daughter will discover it and tells a semiconscious Tommy that he is a killer, threatening to slit Tommy’s throat and rape Claudia if he cannot escape soon. Claudia wakes to Karl smoking and urinating in the elevator and demands her inhaler back. Karl forces the nearly breathless Claudia to climb onto the elevator roof and reach a fire alarm he has found, throwing her inhaler upward so she must climb to retrieve it. Claudia reaches for the alarm, but drops the inhaler and it shatters; the ledge she is clinging to collapses and she falls back into the elevator car.

Further flashbacks reveal Karl’s wife died by suicide, and he becomes convinced his daughter knows his secret. Claudia asks for Tommy’s knife to pry open the doors, but Karl mocks her and openly admits he is a killer. Using his camera flash to disorient them, Karl stabs Tommy to death.

Claudia fights Karl as the elevator slowly slips toward a floor. She forces the doors open and begins to climb out, but Karl slashes at her legs from inside. Claudia kicks him back and escapes as the elevator drops again, severing Karl’s arm and ultimately crushing him. Claudia staggers away, but arrives too late to deliver the photograph her grandmother requested.

== Cast ==
- Amber Tamblyn as Claudia
- Aidan Gillen as Karl
- Armie Hammer as Tommy
- Katie Stuart as Francesca
- Emma Prescott as Nikki
- Mark Boone Junior as Francesca's Father (uncredited)

== Release ==
Blackout was released on DVD in the U.S. on January 13, 2009.

=== Box office ===
The film was released in Russia on May 29, 2008, and debuted at #7, averaging $2,118 on 68 screens, for a gross of $144,015. The film finished with a gross of $296,411 in Russia.

== Reception ==
Michael Bonedigger of HorrorNews.net called it "A smart, gripping and intelligent suspense ride". Annie Riordan of Brutal as Hell rated the film 3/5 stars and stated that the plot requires much suspension of disbelief, but it's worth watching.
