= Paint It Black (novel) =

2006 novel by Janet Fitch

Paint it Black
- Author: Janet Fitch
- Language: English
- Series: JADE
- Genre: Novel
- Publisher: Little, Brown and Co.
- Publication date: 2006
- Publication place: United States
- Media type: Print (Hardback & Paperback)
- Pages: 400 pp
- ISBN: 978-0-316-18274-4
- OCLC: 65400314
- Dewey Decimal: 813/.54 22
- LC Class: PS3556.I8155 P35 2006
- Preceded by: White Oleander

Paint It Black is the third novel by American author Janet Fitch. Paint it Black is set in Los Angeles, California during the 1980s punk rock scene. There are references to artists and events of that era, such as the Germs (with emphasis on their lead singer Darby Crash) and the death of John Lennon, along with insights into the art world that surrounds the protagonist, Josie.

The book was first published in 2006.

== Background ==
Janet Fitch's third novel was originally planned to be a lengthy historical novel. But after her publisher contacted her regarding the manuscript, Fitch was told that the project would most likely not be fulfilled. She was given approval to finish Paint It Black after her agent read about one hundred pages of the handwritten manuscript. Fitch originally considered this work a side project.

== Reaction ==
Some fans were unhappy with the final result, one reviewer saying, "If you enjoyed White Oleander, as I did, and expect more of the same in Paint It Black, you’ll be disappointed." Another was quoted as saying, "How Paint It Black holds up for readers under the scrutiny of comparison remains to be seen, but Fitch's fans should know that while the plot is very different, her new book returns to many of the same settings and themes she introduced in White Oleander, this time exploring them in an even deeper way." Karen Valby, of Entertainment Weekly, is quoted in her review as saying, "The two lash at each other's jugulars, their shared misery both a balm and a repellent. Would that Fitch had left the little punk to her vodka and speed, and zeroed in on the wicked older woman."

Fitch herself, in an Amazon.com blog dated December 4, 2007, said, "Paint It Black started as a gothic little short story, which became the emotional core of the book, like a secret windowless room at the heart of a haunted mansion. Then I built outwards from that room, into the outer life of the book, until I finally got the beginning, and then the ending, which is the doorway out, into the sun."

== Adaptation ==
The novel was adapted into a movie of the same name in 2016 directed by Amber Tamblyn and starring Alia Shawkat as Josie.
