= Detroit Film Critics Society Award for Best Actress =

Annual US film award

The Detroit Film Critics Society Award for Best Actress is an annual award given by the Detroit Film Critics Society to honor the best actress that year.

== Winners ==
indicates the winners.

=== 2000s ===
Year	Actress	Film
2007	Elliot Page (Note: Credited as Ellen Page; Juno was released before Page came out as transgender.)	Juno
2007	Amy Adams	Enchanted
2007	Julie Christie	Away from Her
2007	Marion Cotillard	La Vie en rose
2007	Laura Linney	The Savages
2008	Kate Winslet	Revolutionary Road
2008	Anne Hathaway	Rachel Getting Married
2008	Sally Hawkins	Happy-Go-Lucky
2008	Melissa Leo	Frozen River
2008	Meryl Streep	Doubt
2009	Gabourey Sidibe	Precious
2009	Alison Lohman	Drag Me to Hell
2009	Carey Mulligan	An Education
2009	Saoirse Ronan	The Lovely Bones
2009	Meryl Streep	Julie & Julia

=== 2010s ===
Year	Actress	Film
2010	Jennifer Lawrence	Winter's Bone
2010	Nicole Kidman	Rabbit Hole
2010	Carey Mulligan	Never Let Me Go
2010	Natalie Portman	Black Swan
2010	Michelle Williams	Blue Valentine
2011	Michelle Williams	My Week with Marilyn
2011	Viola Davis	The Help
2011	Felicity Jones	Like Crazy
2011	Meryl Streep	The Iron Lady
2011	Charlize Theron	Young Adult
2012	Jennifer Lawrence	Silver Linings Playbook
2012	Jessica Chastain	Zero Dark Thirty
2012	Greta Gerwig	Damsels in Distress
2012	Naomi Watts	The Impossible
2012	Michelle Williams	Take This Waltz
2013	Brie Larson	Short Term 12
2013	Amy Adams	American Hustle
2013	Julie Delpy	Before Midnight
2013	Adèle Exarchopoulos	Blue Is the Warmest Colour
2013	Meryl Streep	August: Osage County
2014	Rosamund Pike	Gone Girl
2014	Essie Davis	The Babadook
2014	Scarlett Johansson	Under the Skin
2014	Julianne Moore	Still Alice
2014	Reese Witherspoon	Wild
2015	Saoirse Ronan	Brooklyn
2015	Cate Blanchett	Carol
2015	Brie Larson	Room
2015	Jennifer Lawrence	Joy
2015	Bel Powley	The Diary of a Teenage Girl
2016	Emma Stone	La La Land
2016	Amy Adams	Arrival
2016	Annette Bening	20th Century Women
2016	Rebecca Hall	Christine
2016	Ruth Negga	Loving
2016	Natalie Portman	Jackie
2017	Frances McDormand	Three Billboards Outside Ebbing, Missouri
2017	Jessica Chastain	Molly's Game
2017	Sally Hawkins	The Shape of Water
2017	Margot Robbie	I, Tonya
2017	Saoirse Ronan	Lady Bird
2018	Toni Collette	Hereditary
2018	Olivia Colman	The Favourite
2018	Elsie Fisher	Eighth Grade
2018	Lady Gaga	A Star Is Born
2018	Melissa McCarthy	Can You Ever Forgive Me?
2019	Scarlett Johansson	Marriage Story
2019	Julianne Moore	Gloria Bell
2019	Lupita Nyong'o	Us
2019	Charlize Theron	Bombshell
2019	Renée Zellweger	Judy

=== 2020s ===
Year	Actress	Film
2020	Frances McDormand	Nomadland
2020	Jessie Buckley	I'm Thinking of Ending Things
2020	Viola Davis	Ma Rainey's Black Bottom
2020	Vanessa Kirby	Pieces of a Woman
2020	Carey Mulligan	Promising Young Woman
2021	Jessica Chastain	The Eyes of Tammy Faye
2021	Alana Haim	Licorice Pizza
2021	Jennifer Hudson	Respect
2021	Nicole Kidman	Being the Ricardos
2021	Kristen Stewart	Spencer
