= Paint It Black (2016 film) =

- Directed by: Amber Tamblyn
- Written by: Amber Tamblyn; Ed Dougherty
- Based on: Paint It Black by Janet Fitch
- Produced by: Wren Arthur; Amy Hobby; Anne Hubbell; Amber Tamblyn
- Starring: Janet McTeer; Alia Shawkat; Rhys Wakefield; Emily Rios; Alfred Molina
- Cinematography: Brian Rigney Hubbard
- Edited by: Paul Frank
- Production companies: Olive Productions; Tangerine Entertainment
- Distributed by: Imagination Worldwide
- Release dates: June 3, 2016 (LAFF); May 19, 2017 (United States)
- Running time: 97 minutes
- Country: United States
- Language: English

Paint It Black is a 2016 American film directed by Amber Tamblyn and co-written with Ed Dougherty based on Janet Fitch's 2006 novel of the same name. The film premiered at the 2016 LA Film Festival. The story centers on how a young artist's suicide affects his mother and girlfriend, who blame each other for the tragedy.

== Plot ==
After her boyfriend, Michael, ignores her for days, Josie receives a phone call from the police informing her that he committed suicide at a motel. At the funeral she is attacked by Michael's mother, Meredith, who blames Josie for his death. Michael's father, Cal, takes her out for drinks after the funeral to explain that Michael was heavily depressed and that he and Meredith had an unusually close relationship with Cal being regarded as the interloper.

Josie copes with Michael's death by going out and getting drunk every night. When that no longer works she visits Meredith's home and the two get drunk together. The following morning Meredith tracks Josie down and asks Josie to show her the place she lived with Michael. Josie reluctantly consents but refuses to let Meredith take any of Michael's possessions. The following night, returning home, she finds that Meredith has stolen nearly everything in the apartment. In retaliation Josie breaks into Meredith's home and steals back some of Michael's things.

Later she calls Meredith from a phone booth and accuses her of trying to kill her. She makes Meredith promise to return Michael's sketchbooks to her. Meredith goes to meet her with only a few of the notebooks and then asks her to move in with her temporarily, promising to give her the rest of Michael's things.

Josie agrees and goes to live with Meredith. She gets sick and Meredith nurses her back to health and dresses her in beautiful clothing and has her attend lavish dinner parties. Eventually Josie tires of this lifestyle and leaves, going to the motel where Michael committed suicide. While at the motel Josie tries to get the receptionist to talk to her about Michael, but she avoids the subject. Instead an employee secretly talks to Josie and admits she is the one who found Michael and slips Josie the key to his room.

The following morning Josie walks into the desert and rips up Michael's drawings and abandons them there. Returning to the motel she offers the sympathetic employee a ride away from the motel as the circumstances of her employment seem strange and confining. The employee declines and Josie leaves the motel, but as she is leaving she sees the employee running towards her in her rear view mirror and stops the car so she can get in.

== Cast ==
- Alia Shawkat as Josie Tyrell
- Janet McTeer as Meredith
- Alfred Molina as Cal Faraday
- Emily Rios as Pen
- Rhys Wakefield as Michael
- Annabelle Attanasio as Amanda One
- Nancy Kwan as Margaret
- Erik Valdez as Officer Valducci
- Ashley Blaine Featherson as Shirley Mae
- Patrick Davis as Marbles
- Chris Palko as Nick Nitro

== Development ==
Tamblyn optioned the rights to the book in 2012 with the idea of producing the movie and starring as the lead character with Courtney Hunt directing. By 2014 Tamblyn had taken on writing and directing duties herself and had cast Alia Shawkat in the lead role. Filming was completed in December 2014.

== Reception ==
Rotten Tomatoes has given it a 88% rating based on reviews from 25 critics.

Gary Goldstein of the Los Angeles Times wrote, "An intriguing audio-visual sense, deft editing and Shawkat's committed performance elevate this strangely watchable film." Peter Travers of Rolling Stone commented, "Actress Amber Tamblyn's first movie as a director dives headfirst into the hot-button subject of suicide and emerges with expressionistic power with savage grace." Katie Walsh of The Playlist wrote, "Paint it Black has some real gems among the jumble, especially Shawkat, who ably shoulders the task at hand, and gives a raw and sensitive performance of a woman dealing with the loss of a lover far too young."
