= White Oleander (film) =

- Theatrical release poster
- Directed by: Peter Kosminsky
- Screenplay by: Mary Agnes Donoghue
- Based on: White Oleander by Janet Fitch
- Produced by: Hunt Lowry; John Wells
- Starring: Alison Lohman; Robin Wright Penn; Michelle Pfeiffer; Renée Zellweger; Billy Connolly; Patrick Fugit; Cole Hauser; Noah Wyle
- Cinematography: Elliot Davis
- Edited by: Chris Ridsdale
- Music by: Thomas Newman
- Production companies: Pandora Films; Gaylord Films
- Distributed by: Warner Bros. Pictures
- Release date: October 11, 2002
- Running time: 109 minutes
- Country: United States
- Language: English
- Budget: $16 million
- Box office: $21 million

White Oleander is a 2002 American drama film directed by Peter Kosminsky. The film stars Alison Lohman in the central role of Astrid Magnussen and Michelle Pfeiffer as her manipulative mother, Ingrid, with Robin Wright, Noah Wyle, and Renée Zellweger in supporting roles. The screenplay was adapted from Janet Fitch's 1999 novel White Oleander, which was selected for Oprah's Book Club in May 1999.

== Plot ==
Fifteen-year-old Astrid Magnussen lives in Los Angeles with her free-spirited artist mother Ingrid. Too young to remember her father, she relies heavily upon her self-centered mother who is in a relationship with Barry, a writer. When Ingrid discovers Barry cheating on her, she murders him with white oleander poison and is incarcerated. Starr Thomas, a former stripper, recovering alcoholic and born-again Christian becomes Astrid's first foster mother and Astrid is baptised into Starr's church. Starr fears Astrid is sleeping with her live-in boyfriend, Ray. She falls off the wagon and drunkenly shoots Astrid in the shoulder. Starr and Ray disappear and their children beg Astrid not to involve the authorities.

After recovering from her gunshot, Astrid is moved to the McKinney Children's Center (aka "Mac") where she befriends fellow artist Paul Trout. Astrid is placed with former actress Claire Richards and her producer husband Mark and Astrid finally thrives. Astrid discovers Ingrid and Claire are corresponding and Ingrid insists on meeting her. At the prison visit, Ingrid jealously exploits Claire's low self-esteem and suspicions over Mark's fidelity. Claire's worsening depression leads to a fight with Mark that makes her consider returning Astrid to MAC before committing suicide.

Devastated by the loss of Claire, Astrid blames Ingrid for the suicide and announces she will not visit again. Paul reveals he will leave MAC on turning 18 and move to New York. Astrid refuses his request to join him, and Astrid passes up good foster parent candidates for Russian immigrant Rena Gruschenka, who uses kids as laborers for her flea market business. Ingrid's attorney, Susan Vallares, offers Astrid anything she wants in exchange for lying for her mother in court. Astrid refuses, and also refuses Rena's offer to make her an equal partner in her business.

Astrid surprises Ingrid with a final prison visit and demands answers about her past in exchange for testifying that Barry committed suicide. Astrid renews her relationship with Paul and they attend Ingrid's trial together. When the courtroom empties early, Susan explains that Ingrid instructed her to not include Astrid's testimony. Ingrid and Astrid stare at one another as she is led away back to prison. Astrid realizes her mother finally let her go.

Two years later, a blonde-again Astrid lives in NYC with Paul, tending to her art: dioramas in suitcases depicting her life up to that point. As she passes them, she closes each stating she will never visit the horrors they contain again. Pausing at the final one depicting Ingrid, Astrid reflects that although flawed, she knows her mother loves her.

== Cast ==
- Alison Lohman as Astrid Magnussen
- Robin Wright as Starr Thomas
- Michelle Pfeiffer as Ingrid Magnussen
- Renée Zellweger as Claire Richards
- Billy Connolly as Barry Kolker
- Svetlana Efremova as Rena Gruschenka
- Patrick Fugit as Paul Trout
- Cole Hauser as Ray
- Noah Wyle as Mark Richards
- Amy Aquino as Ms. Martinez
- Liz Stauber as Carolee

== Production ==
Principal photography for White Oleander began on April 23, 2001. Filming took place in Santa Clarita, California. Barbra Streisand turned down offers to direct the film and play Ingrid Magnussen. Alison Lohman wore a wig throughout filming because she had just finished playing a cancer patient in deleted scenes from the film Dragonfly (2002). The film clip Claire (Renée Zellweger) shows Astrid as an example of her acting career is of Zellweger's own early performance in The Return of the Texas Chainsaw Massacre (1994).

== Release ==
=== Reception ===
On the review aggregator website Rotten Tomatoes, 69% of 135 critics' reviews are positive. The website's consensus reads: "Strong performances by the lead actresses make White Oleander a compelling female melodrama." Metacritic, which uses a weighted average, assigned the film a score of 61 out of 100, based on 35 critics, indicating "generally favorable" reviews.

Stephen Holden, writing for The New York Times, called it a "rich, turbulent adaptation," and described the performances as "superbly acted from top to bottom." Comparing it to other films on the same theme – Anywhere but Here (1999), Tumbleweeds (1999), and The Divine Secrets of the Ya-Ya Sisterhood (2002) – Holden found White Oleander to be the only one to show "how children instinctively absorb their parents' attitudes and personalities." Andrew Sarris, writing for The Observer, named it as a runner-up on his list of the ten best English-language films of 2002. Roger Ebert, writing for the Chicago Sun-Times, was critical of the film, writing, "The performances are often touching and deserve a better screenplay."

The performances were widely acclaimed, particularly those of Pfeiffer and Lohman. The New York Times called Pfeiffer's role the "most complex screen performance of her career... at once irresistible and diabolical", while the Los Angeles Times singled out her "riveting, impeccable performance in what is literally and figuratively a killer role." Variety described it as a "daring, unsympathetic performance". Lohman's work was variously described as "the year's most auspicious screen acting début", a "tremendously weighty and extended role... [taken on] with great confidence" and an "awesome performance".

=== Accolades ===
Pfeiffer won the Kansas City Film Critics Circle Award for Best Supporting Actress and the San Diego Film Critics Society Award for Best Supporting Actress, and received a nomination for the Screen Actors Guild Award for Outstanding Supporting Actress. Zellweger was nominated for the Satellite Award for Best Supporting Actress – Motion Picture.

Lohman was nominated for the Phoenix Film Critics Society Award for Best Newcomer.

Marc Donato won a Young Artist Award in the category of Best Performance in a Feature Film – Supporting Young Actor.

=== Home media ===
White Oleander was released on VHS and DVD by Warner Home Video on March 11, 2003, and includes special features such as the theatrical trailer, interviews with the cast and creators, behind the scenes footage, deleted scenes, an audio commentary with Peter Kosminsky, John Wells and Janet Fitch, and Cast and Crew film highlights.

Umbrella Entertainment re-released White Oleander on DVD in December 2011. The DVD is compatible with all region codes and includes all the special features from the original DVD release.

=== Music ===
Sheryl Crow's song "Safe and Sound", from her album C'mon, C'mon was the theme song for the theatrical trailer, and also the end credits.
