= Black Warrior Brewing Company =

Craft brewery in Tuscaloosa, Alabama

Coordinates: 33°12′38.32″N 87°33′58.78″W

- Industry: Alcoholic beverage
- Founded: 2012
- Defunct: May 10, 2026
- Headquarters: Tuscaloosa, Alabama
- Area served: Alabama
- Products: beer
- Owner: Joe Fuller; Eric Hull; Jason Spikes; Wayne Yarbrough
- Number of employees: 4

Black Warrior Brewing Company was a craft brewery in Tuscaloosa, Alabama that was open from 2012 to 2026.

== History ==
Founders Joe Fuller, Jason Spikes and Eric Hull were friends and home-brewing enthusiasts who also worked together before they decided to open the brewery. They named the company after the Black Warrior River that runs through Tuscaloosa County. Black Warrior was the second brewery to open in Tuscaloosa after Tuscaloosa's city council voted to change the city's zoning ordinances in 2012 to allow breweries and brewpubs.

The previous tenant of the brewery's two-story commercial storefront in the Downtown Tuscaloosa Historic District was the Oak City Barber & Beauty Shop, historically Black-owned business.

It permanently closed on May 10, 2026.

== Beers ==
- Apricot Wheat (4.6% ABV)
- Blonde Ale (5.1% ABV)
- Broad Street Brown Ale (5.4% ABV)
- Lock 17 IPA (6.2% ABV)
- Crimson Ale (5.2% ABV)
- Belgian Red Rye (6.8% ABV)*
- Additional Weekly New Small-Batch Brews

== Community ==
Once a month, Black Warrior Brewing hosted a charity night titled "Pints with a Purpose", which donates a percentage of sales back to a different local charity every month. In March 2014, the brewery hosted Ales to Fight Hunger, a fundraiser for a charity that provides weekend food to hungry schoolchildren in Alabama. The company also sponsored Tuscaloosa GoKickBall.
