= Rocket Republic Brewing Company =

Brewery in Madison, Alabama

Coordinates: 34°40′22.19″N 86°46′26.44″W

Rocket Republic Brewing Company, Inc. is a craft brewery located in Madison, Alabama.

Incorporated in March 2013, the brewery received their state ABC license in July 2013. The brewery launched its beers on September 6, 2013, at The Nook, a beer bar in Huntsville, Alabama. The launch beers were Vapor Trail Cream Ale and Astronut Brown Ale.

== Brewing ==
Rocket Republic ceased contract brewing, started brewing out of their own facility in March 2015 and opened their tap room on March 17, 2015. All beer is produced out of their 10,000 square foot warehouse space converted into a functioning brewery. As part of this project, the brewery launched an Indiegogo campaign

Rocket Republic owns a 15 bbl direct fire brewhouse from San Diego–based Premier Stainless.

== Beers ==
- AstroNut Brown Ale [Draft and cans]
- Dark Matter Belgian Dark Strong Ale [Draft]
- Mach 1 India Pale Ale [Draft and cans]
- Peanut Butter AstroNut [Draft]
- Pomegranate Planet Wheat Beer [Draft]
- Cherry Wheat [Draft]
- Smokehouse Brown Ale – Contract beer with Moe's Original BBQ [Draft]
- Steampunkin' Pumpkin Ale [Draft]
- Terrestri-Ale Belgian style Tripel [Draft]
- Vapor Trail Cream Ale [Draft and cans]
