= Santa Monica Alternative School House =

Primary school in Santa Monica, California, United States

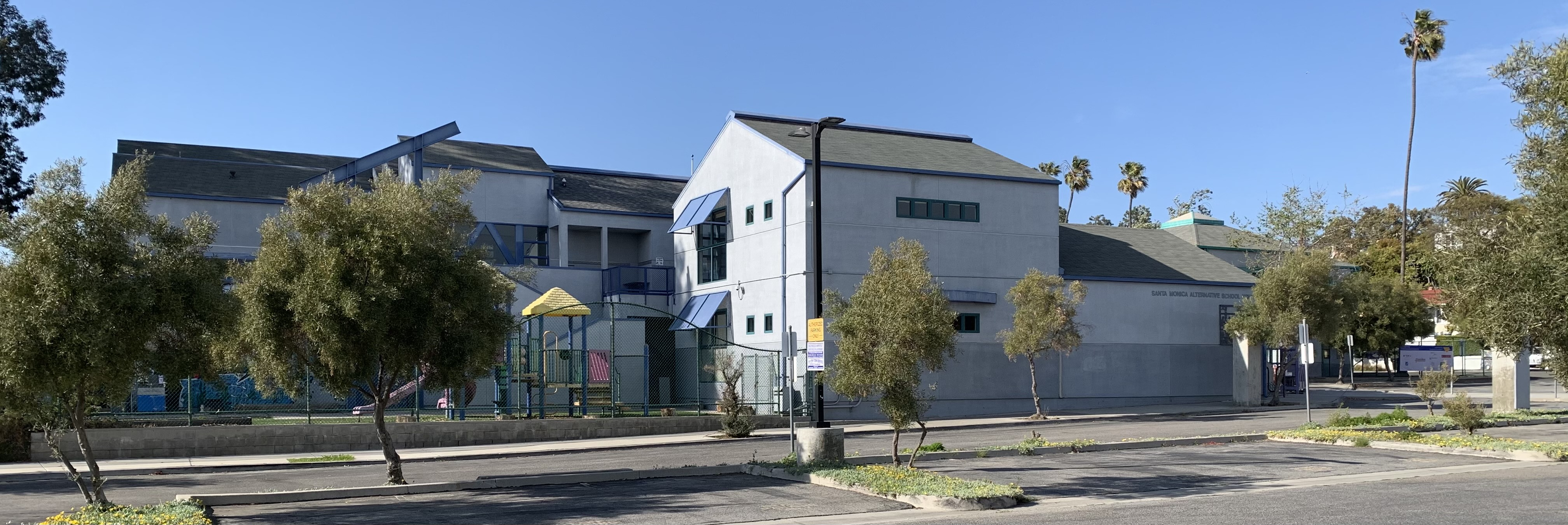

Location
- Santa Monica, California; United States
- Coordinates: 34.005183°N 118.481227°W

Information
- Principal: Jessica Rishe
- Grades: K-8
- Website: https://www.smmusd.org/smash

The Santa Monica Alternative School House (SMASH) is an alternative school in Southern California that was founded in 1973 to emphasize "non-authoritarian, non-competitive, non-sexist methods". Originally serving grades Kindergarten through 12th, SMASH downgraded to a Kindergarten through middle school curriculum in the late 1980s. In 2005–2006, SMASH had 193 students enrolled in grades K-8.

SMASH is a school in the Santa Monica-Malibu Unified School District. They use a constructivist approach to learning that provides opportunities for students to "take ownership of their education". SMASH does not grade students on their performance and instead provides feedback through narrative report cards and parent-teacher conferences.

The school divides classes into "cores" of mixed age grouping which allow for mentoring and a strongly interconnected curriculum and community. Core 1 consists of kindergartners, first and second graders. Core 2 consists of third and fourth graders. Core 3 consists of fifth and sixth graders, and Core 4 of seventh and eighth graders.

In 2016, SMASH was placed on a list of 1,000 low-performing California schools as a result of its 2013 standardized testing scores.
