= Santa Monica–Malibu Unified School District =

School district in Santa Monica, California, US

Address
- 1717 4th St. Santa Monica, California, 90401; United States
- Coordinates: 34°01′20″N 118°28′44″W

District information
- Superintendent: Antonio Shelton
- Schools: 16
- NCES District ID: 0635700

Students and staff
- Students: 9,129 (2021–22)

Other information
- Website: smmusd.org/

Santa Monica–Malibu Unified School District (SMMUSD) is a school district located in Santa Monica, California. The district serves the cities of Santa Monica and Malibu, as well as a portion of Westlake Village, the Pepperdine University census-designated place, and a portion of the Topanga census-designated place. It has ten elementary schools, two middle schools, three high schools, an adult high school, and an alternative school.

== History ==
Until the 1980s, students from Malibu were required to bus a long distance into Santa Monica for grades 10–12, but the former junior high school there has since become Malibu High School..

=== Environmental problems ===
In 2009 and 2010, the Santa Monica–Malibu Unified School District did a polychlorinated biphenyls (PCB) cleanup of Malibu High School overseen by the California Department of Toxic Substances Control. During a 2011 construction project on the Malibu Middle and High Schools and Juan Cabrillo Elementary School, contractors discovered soils were contaminated with PCBs and organochlorine pesticides like chlordane and DDT and presented “an unacceptable health risk”.

In October 2013, 20 teachers jointly complained about health problems, including thyroid cancer. A senior United States Environmental Protection Agency (EPA) employee recommended that teachers consult Public Employees for Environmental Responsibility (PEER) for help.

In February 2014, PEER attorneys asked the school district to assess the Malibu High School campus. In July 2014, the U.S. Army Corps of Engineers wrote that Malibu High school had never been a military site, despite published reports and interviews with long-time residents present during those years that Malibu did serve as a World War II military training center. The school district hired an environmental firm named Environ, whose initial clean up plan was criticized for allowing elevated PCB levels to remain inside classrooms for 15 years or more, for not testing caulk in all rooms built prior to 1979 and for air quality monitoring of only one year. In April 2014, the EPA rejected the clean up plan. In July 2014, Environ released a second PCB clean up plan. Two weeks later PEER published PCB test results of June 2014 caulking and dirt samples from school rooms, not previously tested by the District, "at thousands of times the levels previously released to the public".

In March 2015, parents and teachers filed a lawsuit to have all contaminated caulk removed. PEER estimated that "probably 80 rooms in the district have contaminated caulk, beyond what was first tested".

In November 2015, the district asked the Los Angeles County Sheriff's Department to press charges against a parent who took samples from Malibu High to be tested for contamination.

== Schools ==
Elementary schools

- Malibu Elementary School (Malibu)
- Edison Language Academy (Santa Monica)
- Franklin Elementary School (Santa Monica)
- Grant Elementary School (Santa Monica)
- McKinley Elementary School (Santa Monica)
- John Muir Elementary School (Santa Monica)
- Will Rogers Elementary School (Santa Monica)
- Roosevelt Elementary School (Santa Monica)
- Webster Elementary School (Malibu)
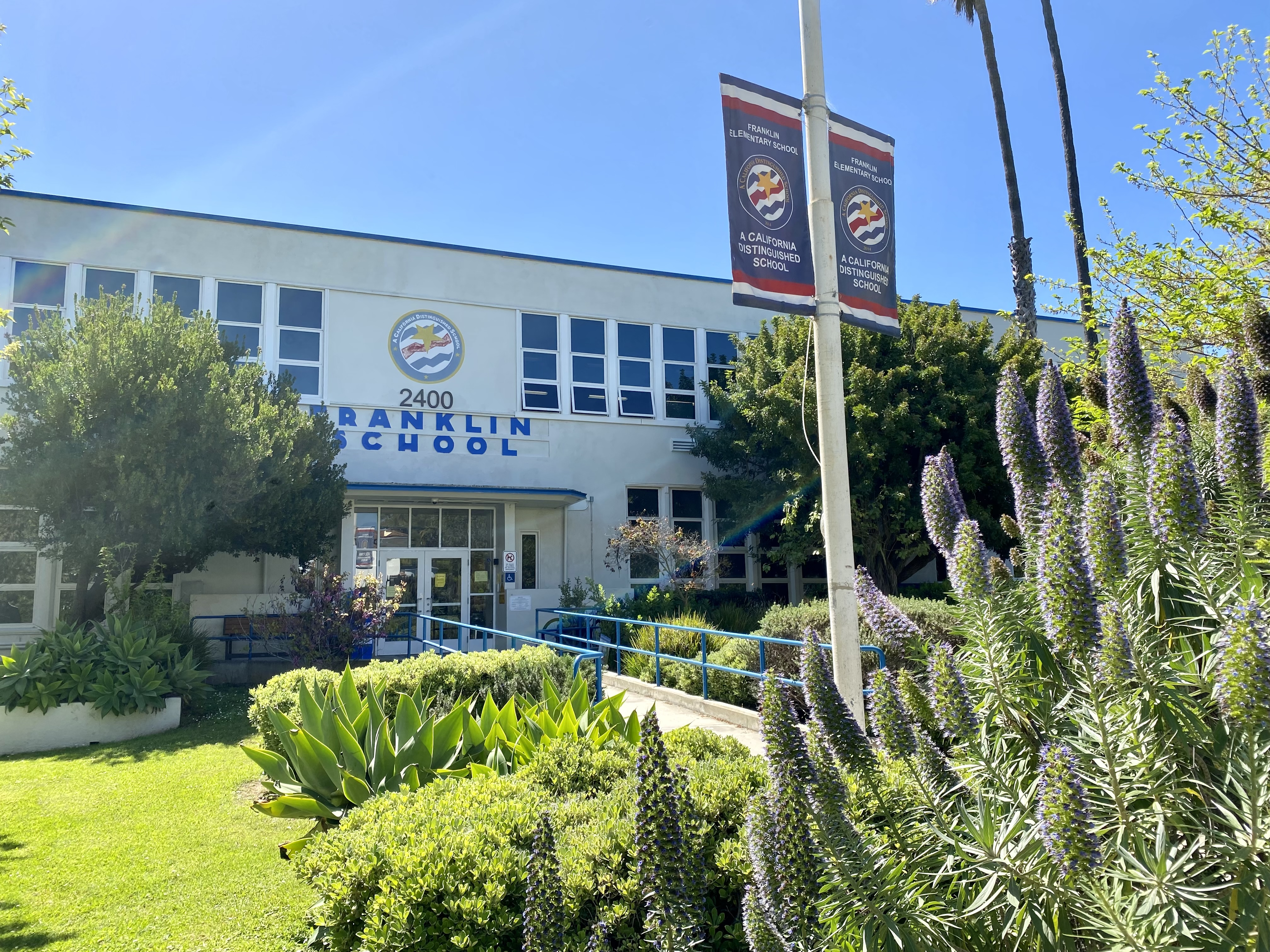
Franklin Elementary School

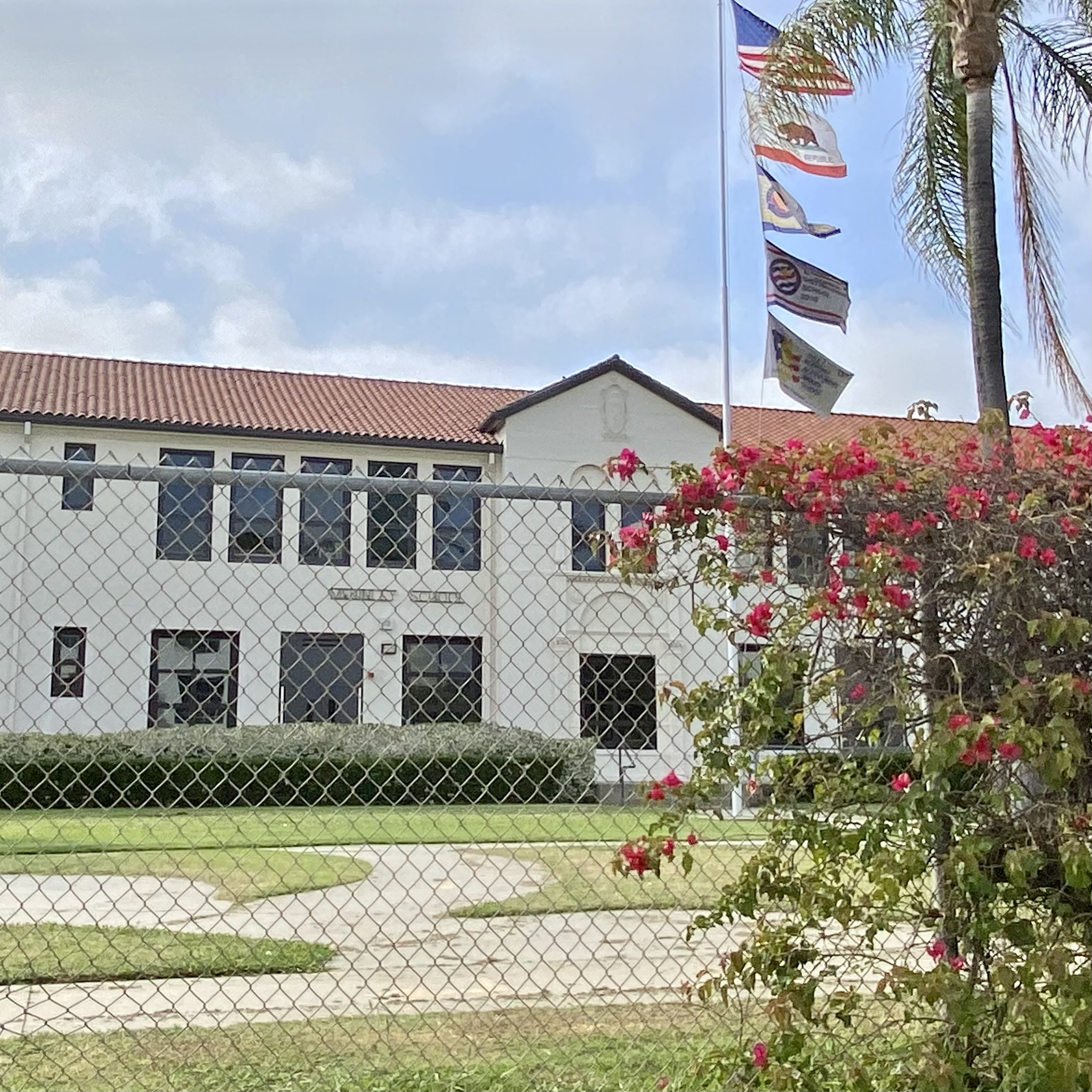
McKinley Elementary School

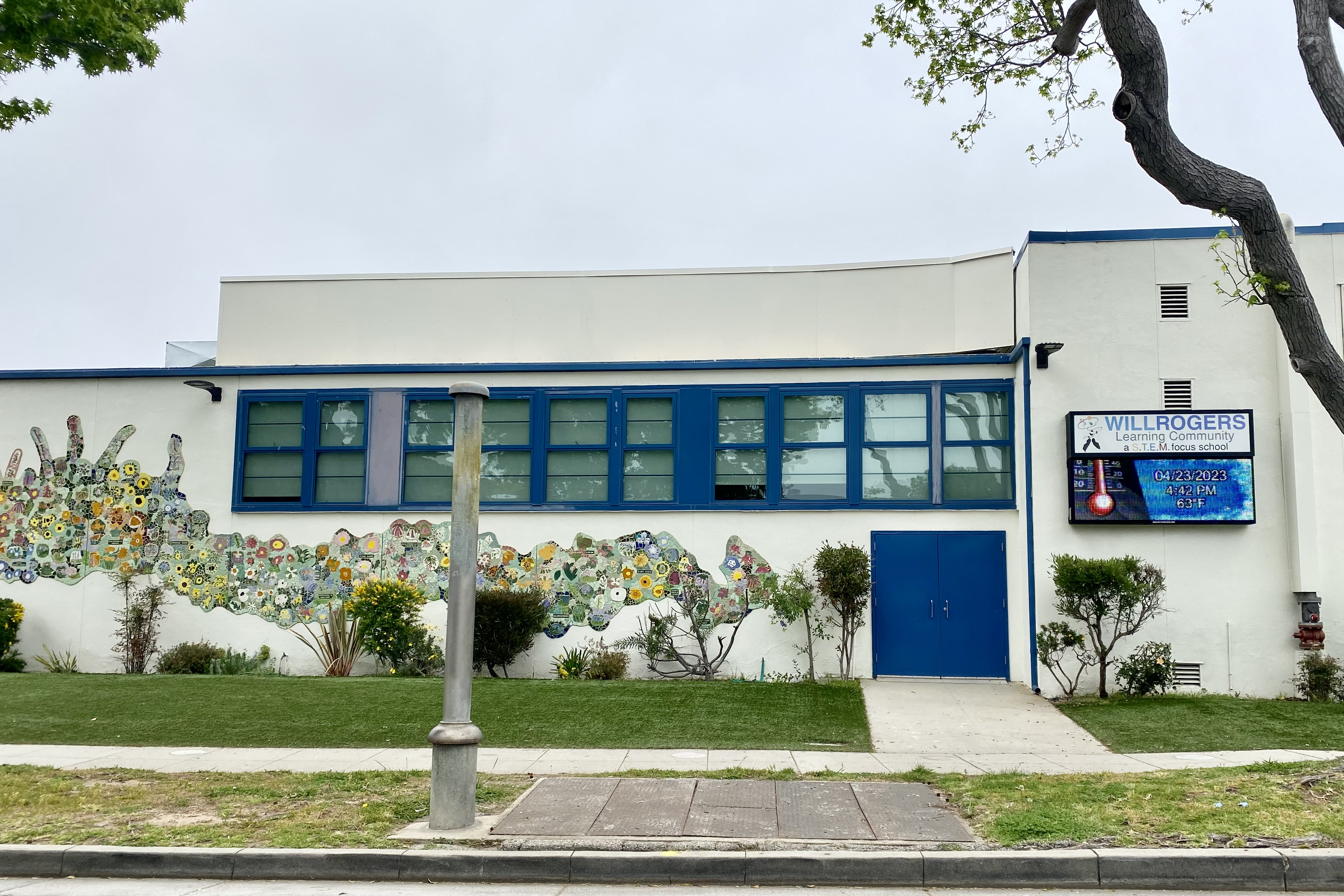
Will Rogers Elementary School

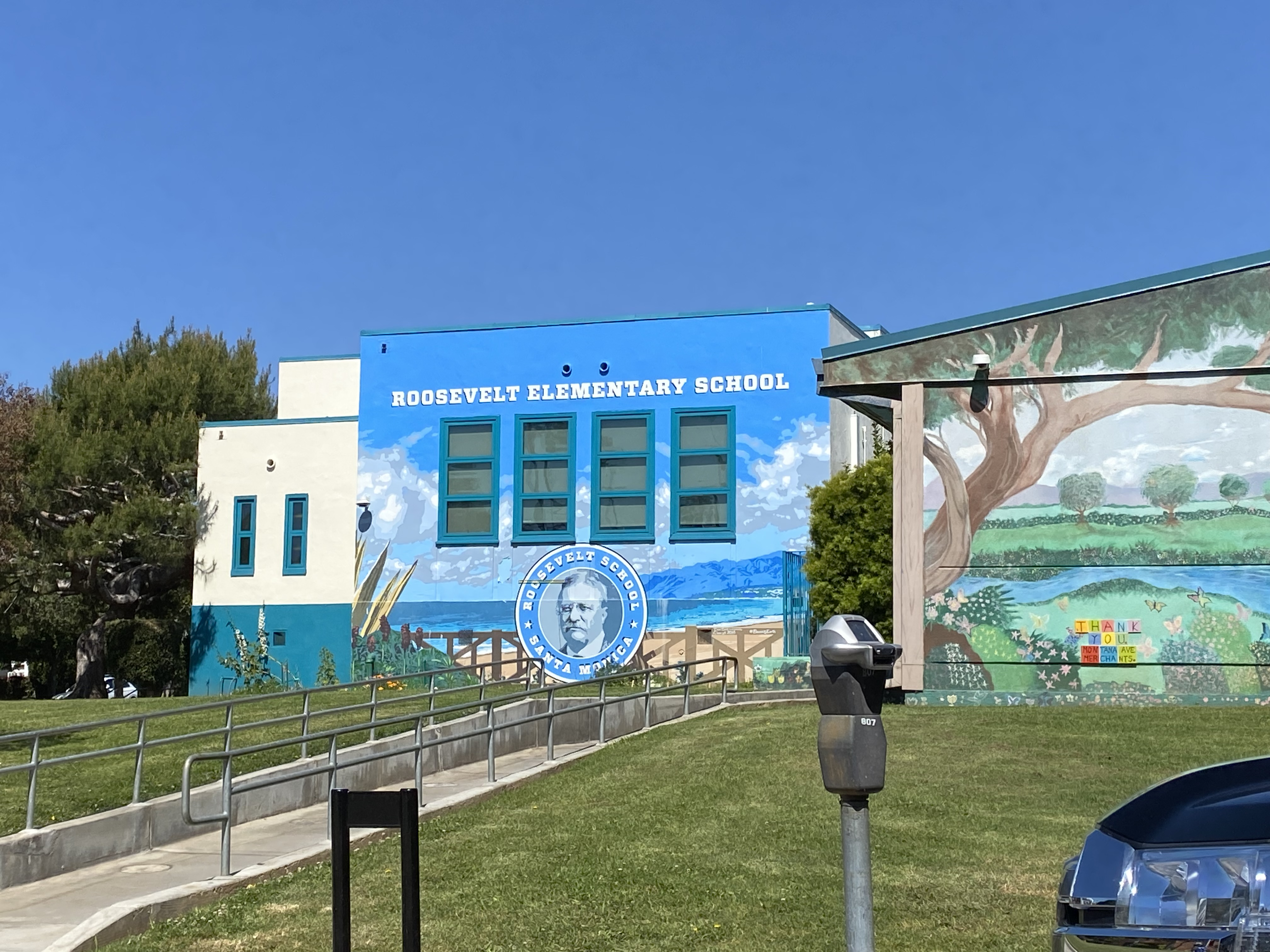
Roosevelt Elementary School

Middle schools

- John Adams Middle School (Santa Monica)
- Lincoln Middle School (Santa Monica)
- Malibu Middle School (Malibu)
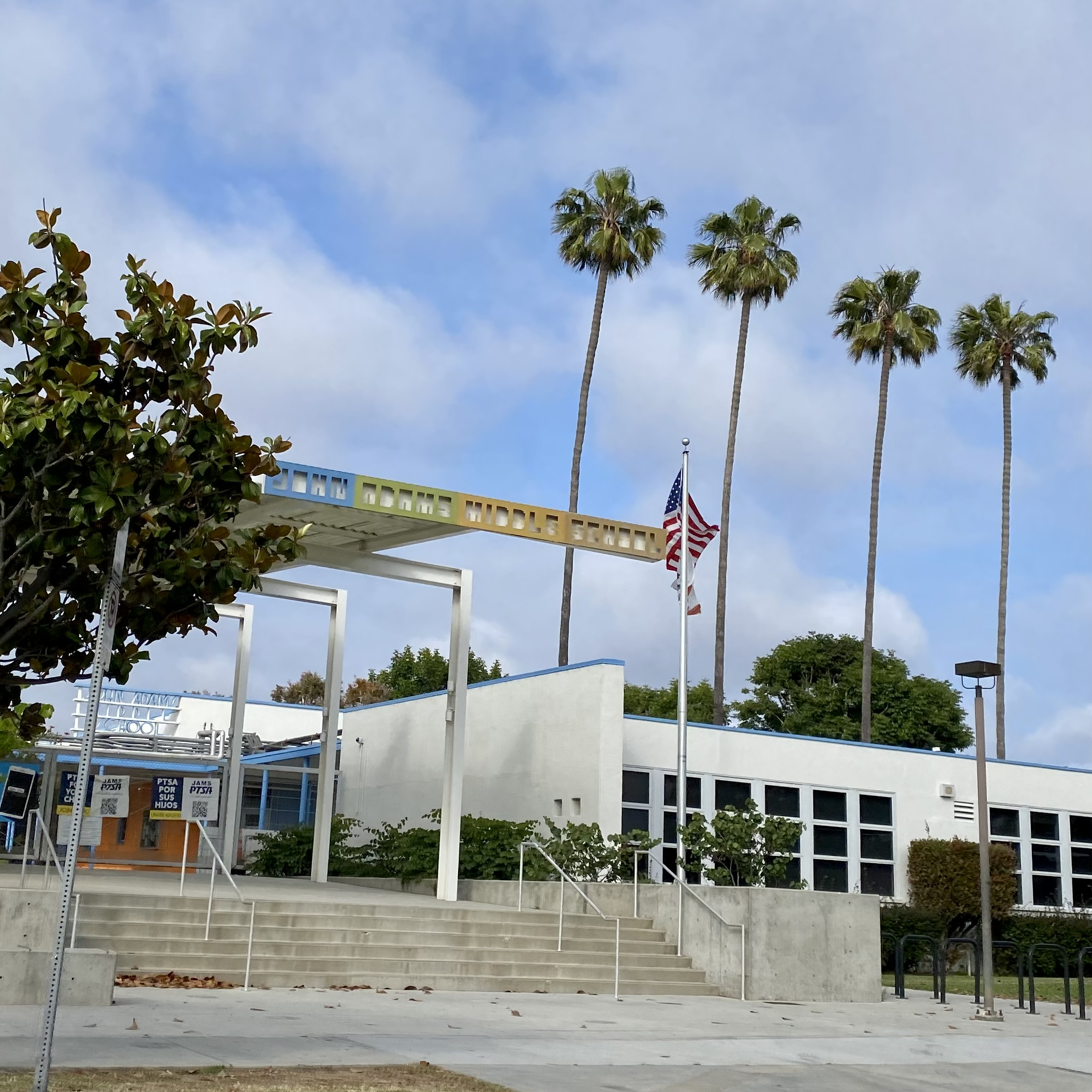
John Adams Middle School

High Schools

- Olympic High School (Santa Monica)
- Malibu High School (Malibu)
- Santa Monica High School aka "SaMoHi" (Santa Monica)
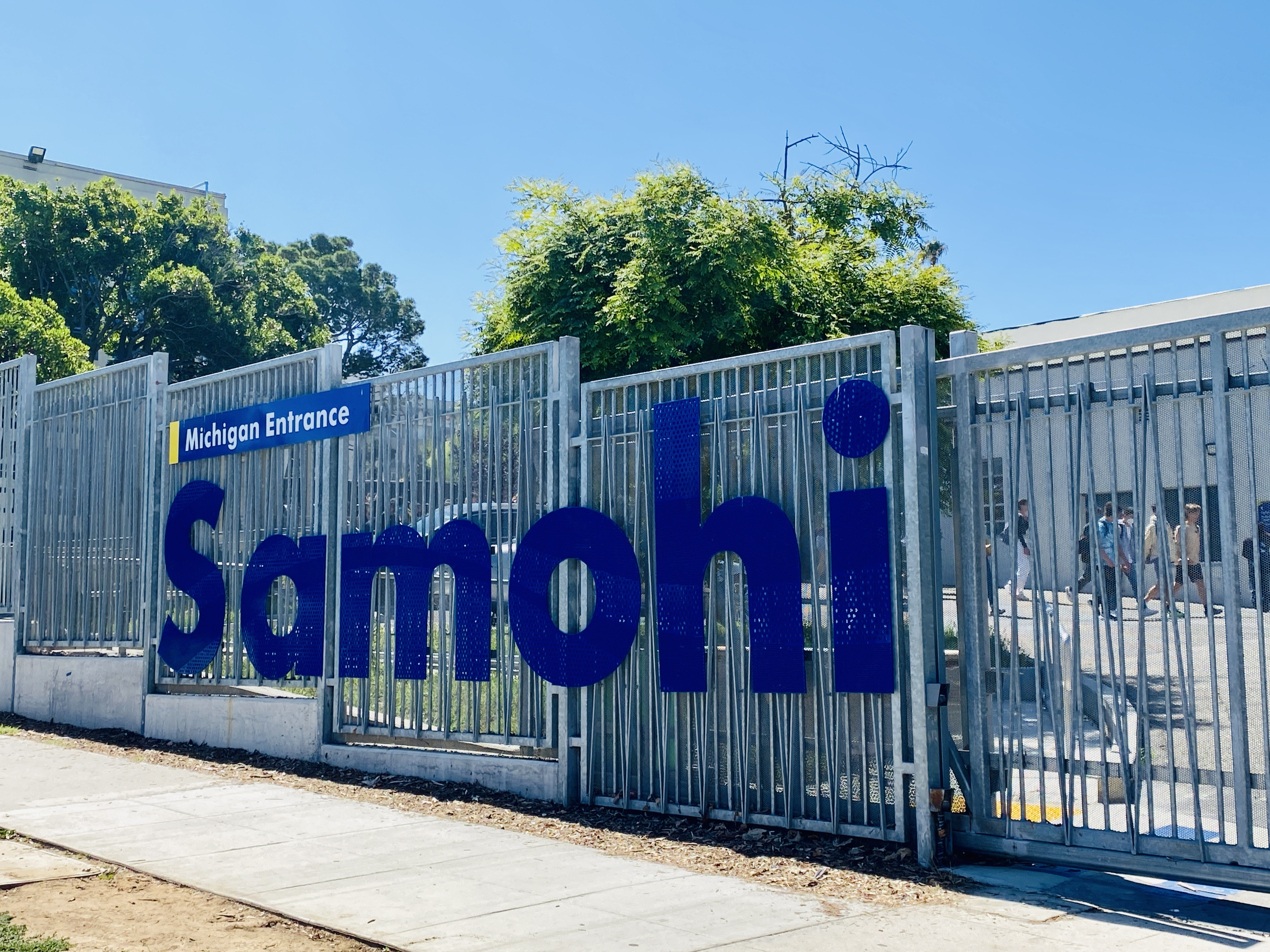
Santa Monica High School

K–8 schools

- Santa Monica Alternative School House aka "SMASH" (Santa Monica)
