= White Oleander =

Book by Janet Fitch

- Author: Janet Fitch
- Language: English
- Series: JADE
- Genre: Bildungsroman
- Publisher: Little, Brown and Co.
- Publication date: 1999
- Publication place: United States
- Media type: Print (Hardback & Paperback)
- Pages: 446 pp
- ISBN: 0-316-28526-9
- OCLC: 40460011
- Dewey Decimal: 813/.54 21
- LC Class: PS3556.I8155 W47 1999

White Oleander is a 1999 novel by American author Janet Fitch. In the fashion of a picaresque novel, it deals with themes of motherhood, telling the story of a girl named Astrid who is separated from her mother, Ingrid, and placed in a series of foster homes. It was chosen for Oprah's Book Club in May 1999, after which it became a national bestseller and was adapted into a 2002 film.

== Plot summary ==
Astrid Magnussen is a 12-year-old girl living in Los Angeles, California with her mother, Ingrid Magnussen, a self-centered and eccentric poet. Astrid's father, Klaus Anders, left before Astrid was old enough to remember him. Ingrid begins dating a man named Barry. Eventually, Ingrid discovers that Barry is cheating on her with younger women, so she breaks into Barry's house and poisons him with a mixture of DMSO and oleander sap. Barry dies, and Ingrid is charged with his murder. Sentenced to life in prison, she promises her daughter that she will come back. Astrid is shuffled from one foster home to another for years. First, she joins Starr, a former stripper who is a recovering drug addict and alcoholic. Starr has two children of her own, as well as two other foster children. Astrid (who is 14 by this time) is sexually exploited and abused by Starr's adult live-in boyfriend, Ray. As his interest in Starr diminishes, Starr relapses. One night, after confronting Ray over his relationship with Astrid (out of jealousy and not concern), Starr shoots Astrid with a .38. Astrid is hospitalized for a few weeks, at which time she begins abusing the prescription drug Demerol.

After recovery Astrid is sent to live with Ed and Marvel Turlock, and their two small children, essentially as an unpaid babysitter. Astrid dislikes the couple, partially due to her dislike of the house, and partially due to Marvel's racism. In particular, she makes racist comments about their next-door neighbor, a beautiful African-American sex worker named Olivia Johnstone, whom Astrid befriends. Astrid admires Olivia's beauty, wealth, and hedonistic lifestyle. The Turlocks send Astrid away when they discover she associates with Olivia. Next, Astrid is sent to the home of a Hispanic woman named Amelia Ramos. Despite her wealth, Amelia starves her foster children, and Astrid resorts to eating from the garbage at school. Astrid eventually gets a new caseworker who finds her a new placement. A former actress, Claire Richards, and her husband, Ron, are Astrid's next foster parents. Claire ensures Astrid's comfort. For once, Astrid is doing well in school and pursuing art. Astrid continues corresponding with Ingrid in prison but becomes increasingly bitter towards her mother. Meanwhile, Claire suspects that Ron is having an affair. Claire, who struggles with depression, dies by suicide after overdosing.

Astrid, now 17, is placed in MacLaren Children's Center (known as "Mac") where she meets an artistic boy named Paul Trout. They bond, but Paul is sent to a group home and Astrid leaves for a new foster parent. Astrid's final home is with Russian immigrant Rena Grushenka. Astrid, still underage, is sexually exploited and abused by Rena's adult boyfriend, Sergei. One day, after getting high on LSD, Astrid begins to have memories of a woman named Annie. Meanwhile, Ingrid and her lawyer begin to build a case to get Ingrid released from prison. However, their case depends on Astrid: if she testifies that Ingrid did not murder Barry, Ingrid will likely not be sentenced. Astrid realizes that she is in a position of power over her mother and asks Ingrid who Annie is. Ingrid reveals that Annie was a babysitter with whom Ingrid left Astrid for over a year. Astrid is upset and gives Ingrid a choice: to have her testify or to see her daughter return to the person her mother knew her as. Ingrid makes the choice not to ask Astrid to lie for her. Two years later, Astrid is 20 and living with Paul in a rundown flat in Berlin. Astrid spends her time buying suitcases and transforming them into individual art pieces representing her different foster homes. Ingrid is released from prison after a new trial acquits her. Astrid realizes that if she returns to California to reunite with Ingrid, she must abandon Paul. She chooses to stay with him but longs to go.

== Major characters ==
Astrid Magnussen: the main character, she is twelve years old when the novel opens. Artistic, shy and in the sway of her manipulative mother. The novel depicts her loss of naivety, sexual abuse, and attempts at self-definition.

Ingrid Magnussen: Astrid's manipulative mother, who is jailed early in the novel for her murder of her lover Barry. When with Astrid, she often forgets she has a daughter and focuses on her eclectic art. Later, she attempts to control Astrid from jail.

Starr: Astrid's first foster mother, she is a former stripper turned outspoken Christian. She is recovering from alcoholism and drug use and lives in a trailer with her children. She first shows kindness to Astrid but later grows jealous of Astrid's relationship with Ray.

'Uncle' Ray: Starr's boyfriend, whose children call him "Uncle Ray." A seemingly kind carpenter, he begins a sexual relationship with Astrid who is, at the time, 14. Thus the relationship is an example of sexual predation.

Olivia Johnstone: An African-American high-class sex worker Astrid befriends while living with her second foster family, the Turlocks. Olivia introduces Astrid to a luxurious, hedonistic lifestyle.

Claire Richards: Astrid's fourth foster mother, who notices Astrid's artistic talent and encourages her to pursue school. Claire has a weak relationship with her husband, poor self-esteem, and commits suicide after encouragement from Ingrid.

Paul Trout: An artistic boy Astrid meets while staying at MacLaren Children's Center (known as "Mac"), a facility for foster children who can't find placements. Astrid later develops a romance with Paul.

Rena Grushenka: Astrid's final foster mother, a tough, business-savvy Russian woman. She is abrasive but encourages Astrid to make sound financial decisions and to become a good negotiator.

== Themes ==
Motherhood is a primary theme of the novel. Astrid struggles to define herself against her biological mother and her various foster mothers, while still searching for the love and acceptance her mother cannot provide from jail. The art pieces Astrid creates at the end of the novel are metaphors for her various mothers and homes.

The novel also deals with the nature of art; self-reflection and creation; survival of the fittest; and perfection versus imperfection.

== Reception ==
The novel received good reviews and had a typical publication run for a debut novel. After being named to Oprah's Book Club in 1999, the popularity of the book skyrocketed. It became a national best seller.

== Origins ==
The short story of the same name appeared in the Fall/Winter 1993 issue of Black Warrior Review. The Best American Short Stories for that year included it in their list of other distinguished short fiction of 1993.

== Adaptations ==
The novel was adapted into a film, White Oleander, released in 2002 starring Michelle Pfeiffer and Renée Zellweger.
