= Janet Fitch =

American novelist (born 1955)

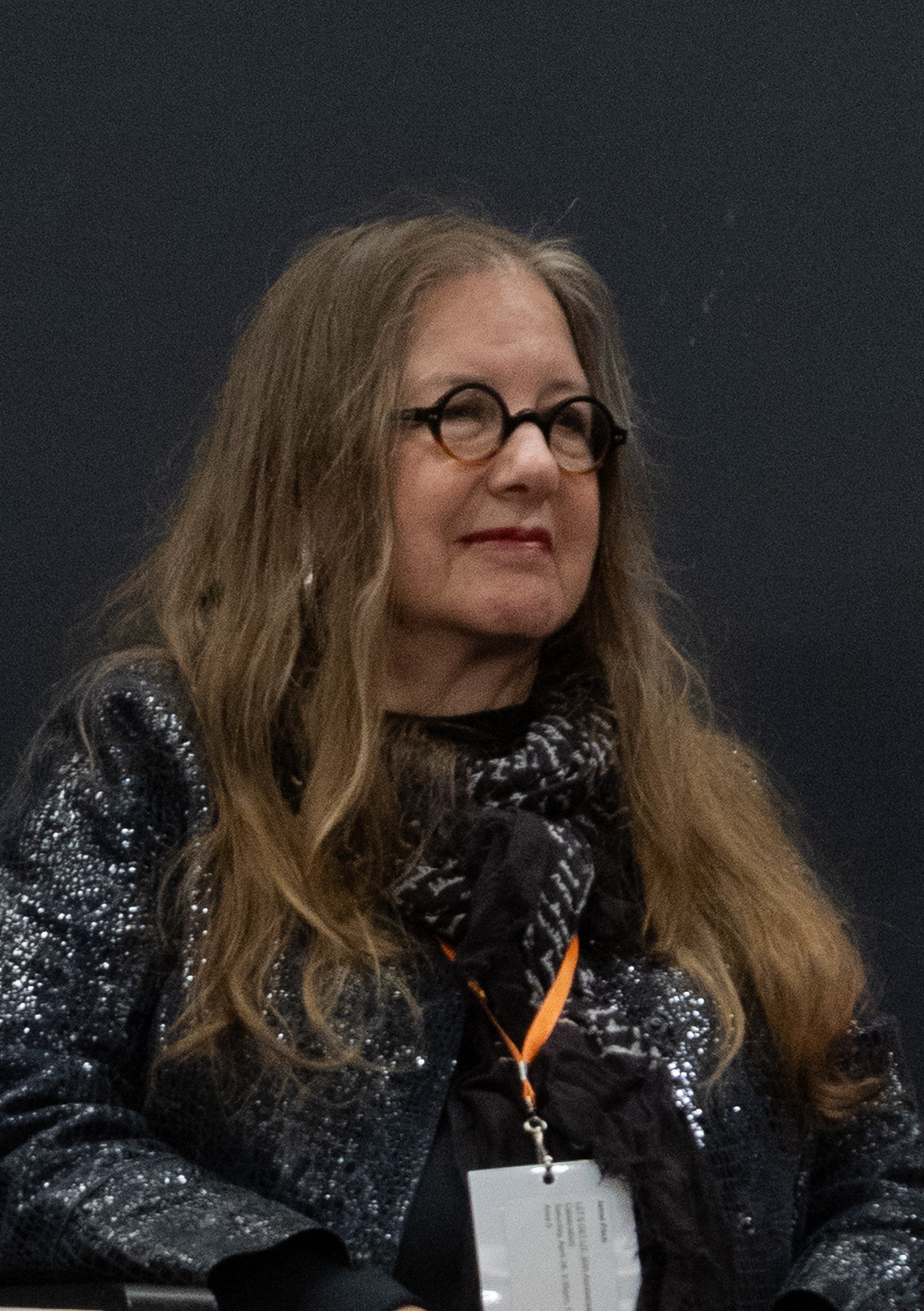
- Fitch in 2025
- Born: Janet Elizabeth Fitch; November 9, 1955 (age 70); Los Angeles, California, U.S.
- Education: Reed College
- Occupation: Writer
- Writing career
- Genre: Literary Fiction
- Notable work: White Oleander

Janet Fitch (born November 9, 1955) is an American author. She wrote the novel White Oleander, which became a film in 2002. She is a graduate of Reed College.

Fitch was born in Los Angeles, a third-generation native, and grew up in a family of voracious readers. As an undergraduate at Reed College, Fitch had decided to become a historian, attracted to its powerful narratives, the scope of events, the colossal personalities, and the potency and breadth of its themes. But when she won a student exchange to Keele University in England, where her passion for Russian history led her, she awoke in the middle of the night on her twenty-first birthday with the revelation she wanted to write fiction.

Fitch was a faculty member in the Master of Professional Writing Program at the University of Southern California, where she taught fiction.

Two of her favorite authors are Fyodor Dostoevsky and Edgar Allan Poe.

Her third novel, Paint It Black, named after the Rolling Stones song of the same name, was published in September 2006. Amber Tamblyn directed a 2016 feature film based on the book.

== Books ==
- Kicks (Fawcett Books, 1996)
- White Oleander (Little, Brown, 1999)
- Paint It Black (Little, Brown, 2006)
- The Revolution of Marina M. (Little, Brown and Company, 2017)
- Chimes of a Lost Cathedral (Little, Brown, 2019)
