= List of Reed College people =

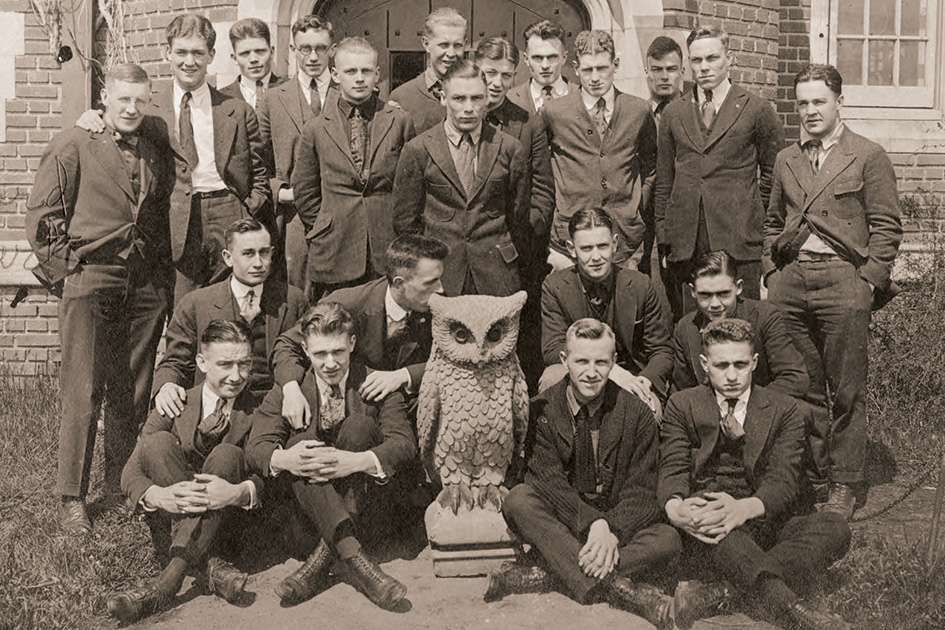
Reed students posing with the college's unofficial mascot, the Doyle Owl

This page lists notable alumni of Reed College, a distinguished liberal arts and sciences institution located in Portland, Oregon. The list includes individuals recognized for their achievements, along with their current and/or former roles.

Students who met specific academic requirements, but did not graduate, are considered full alumni by the college and identified as non-degreed alumni within this list for clarity.

== Alumni ==
=== Academia ===
Name	Year/degree	Notability
Julia Adams	1980	Margaret H. Marshall Professor of Sociology at Yale University
Jon Appleton	1961	Composer; Arthur R. Virgin Professor of Music at Dartmouth College; visiting professor of Music at Stanford University
Karl W. Aschenbrenner	1934	Philosopher; professor emeritus at University of California, Berkeley
Louis T. Benezet	M.A. 1939	President of Allegheny College, Colorado College, Claremont Graduate University, and State University of New York at Albany
Sacvan Bercovitch	N/A	Writer and cultural critic; professor of American Literature, Harvard University (did not graduate)
Walter Berns	N/A	Professor of political philosophy and constitutional law at Yale University, and Cornell University; resident scholar, American Enterprise Institute; recipient of the National Humanities Medal in 2005 (did not graduate)
Charles Bigelow	1967	Type designer and historian; professor of Type Design and Writing, Rochester Institute of Technology
Jonathan Boyarin	1977	Anthropologist; Thomas and Diann Mann Professor of Modern Jewish Studies, departments of Anthropology and Near Eastern Studies at Cornell University
James J. Brady	1934	Physicist; professor emeritus at Oregon State University and fellow of American Institute of Physics
Robert Brenner	1964	Marxist economic historian; professor of History, UCLA; director of the Center for Social Theory and Comparative History
Joan Bresnan	1966	Linguist; architect of lexical functional grammar; Sadie Dernham Patek Professor in Humanities Emerita at Stanford University
Robert A. Brightman	1973	Anthropologist; Greenberg Professor of Native American Studies, Reed College
Peter Child	1975	Composer, teacher, and musical analyst; professor of Music at the Massachusetts Institute of Technology and composer in residence with the New England Philharmonic
Jessica Coon	2004	Linguistics professor at McGill University, Canada Research Chair in syntax and indigenous languages
Galen Cranz	1966	Professor emerita of Architecture at the College of Environmental Design at the University of California, Berkeley
Ann Cvetkovich	1980	Professor in the Feminist Institute of Social Transformation at Carleton University; Ellen Clayton Garwood Centennial Professor of English and Professor of Women’s and Gender Studies at the University of Texas at Austin
Shannon Lee Dawdy	1988	Professor of Anthropology and of Social Sciences, University of Chicago
Kai T. Erikson	1953	President, American Sociological Association and professor at Yale University
Elizabeth Warnock Fernea	1950	Anthropologist and filmmaker; chairwoman of the Woman's Studies Program at the University of Texas at Austin
Janet Fitch	1978	Writer and professor of writing at the University of Southern California and Pomona College
Neil Fligstein	1973	Sociologist; Class of 1939 Chancellor's Professor at the University of California, Berkeley
David H. French	1939	Anthropologist and linguist
Victor Friedman	1970	Andrew W. Mellon Professor of Balkan and Slavic Linguistics, University of Chicago
Peter Gordon	1988	Intellectual historian; Amabel B. James Professor of History at Harvard University
David Grusky	1980	Sociologist; Barbara Kimball Browning Professor in the School of Humanities and Sciences at Stanford University
Ted Robert Gurr	1957	Professor of Political Science, Northwestern University and Distinguished University Professor emeritus at the University of Maryland
Loyd Haberly	1919	Poet; dean, Fairleigh Dickinson University
Peter Dobkin Hall	1968	Professor of History and Theory in the School of Public Affairs at Baruch College, City University of New York, and senior research fellow at the Harvard Kennedy School's Hauser Center for Nonprofit Organizations
Carol Heimer	1973	Professor of Sociology, Northwestern University
David Hoggan	1945	Historian; professor at LMU Munich, San Francisco State College, the University of California at Berkeley, and Massachusetts Institute of Technology, and Carthage College; known for promotion of Holocaust denial
Dell Hymes	1950	Anthropologist and linguist; dean of the University of Pennsylvania Graduate School of Education; president of the American Folklore Society, Linguistic Society of America, and American Anthropological Association
Maurice Isserman	1973	Publius Virgilius Rogers Professor of American History, Hamilton College
Don Kates	1962	Criminologist and lawyer
Gail M. Kelly	1955	Anthropologist, professor emerita at Reed College
Wallace T. MacCaffrey	1942	Historian of Elizabethan England; chaired the Harvard University history department twice
Brendan McConville	1987	Historian of early America; professor of History at Boston University
William D. McElroy	1939	Biochemist; chancellor, University of California, San Diego; former director, National Science Foundation; president of the American Association for the Advancement of Science
Dennis B. McGilvray	1965	Professor of Anthropology, University of Colorado at Boulder
Lisa Nakamura	1987	Coordinator of Digital Studies; Gwendolyn Calvert Baker Collegiate Professor in the Department of American Cultures at the University of Michigan, Ann Arbor
Christopher Newfield	1980	Distinguished Professor of English at the University of California, Santa Barbara
Kaori O'Connor	1968	Anthropologist
Christopher Phelps	1988	Political and intellectual historian; professor of History, University of Nottingham
Ray Raphael	1965	Historian
Diane Silvers Ravitch	N/A	Historian and U.S. assistant secretary of education; professor of History, New York University Steinhardt School of Culture, Education, and Human Development; senior fellow, Brookings Institution (did not graduate)
Barbara Reskin	N/A	S. Frank Miyamoto Professor of Sociology at the University of Washington (did not graduate)
Lawrence Rinder	1983	Dean of Graduate Studies at the California College of the Arts; former curator of Contemporary Art at the Whitney Museum
Stephen Shapin	1966	Franklin L. Ford Research Professor of the History of Science at Harvard University; winner of the 2014 George Sarton Medal of the History of Science Society
Robert E. Slavin	1972	Psychologist; director of the Center for Research and Reform in Education, Johns Hopkins University; cooperative learning, project Success for All
George Steinmetz	1980	Charles Tilly Collegiate Professor of Sociology and Germanic Languages and Literatures at the University of Michigan
Robert K. Thomas	N/A	Literary critic; professor of English and academic vice president, Brigham Young University (did not graduate)
Katherine Verdery	1970	Julien J. Studley Faculty Scholar and Distinguished Professor, Anthropology Program, City University of New York Graduate Center
Jon Westling	1964	President emeritus and professor of History at Boston University
Richard Wolin	1974	Intellectual historian; Distinguished Professor of History and Political Science at the CUNY Graduate Center

==== Economics ====
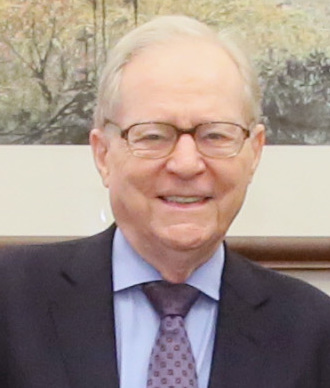
Dale W. Jorgenson, Reed College class of 1955

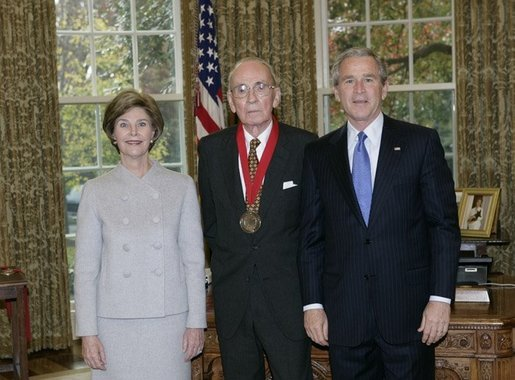
Walter Berns (with First Lady Laura Bush and President George W. Bush) receiving the National Humanities Medal

Name	Year/degree	Notability
Yoram Bauman	1995	Economist and stand-up comedian
Dorothy Brady	1925	Economist and mathematician; professor of Economics, University of Pennsylvania
Robert A. Brady	1923	Chief of the Standards Division, Consumers Advisory Board, National Recovery Administration, and member of the National Resources Planning Board during the New Deal; a founder of the Consumers Union; professor of Economics, University of California, Berkeley
Kalman J. Cohen	1951	Professor of Economics, Duke University
Rose Friedman	N/A	Economist and author; wife of Nobel Prize-winning economist Milton Friedman (did not graduate, left in 1930 after her sophomore year)
Mason Gaffney	1948	Economist; critic of neoclassical economics; director of the Robert Schalkenbach Foundation; professor of economics at the University of California, Los Angeles and Riverside
Lewis Webster Jones	1921	Economist for the League of Nations; president of Bennington College, University of Arkansas, and Rutgers University
Dale W. Jorgenson	1955	Economist; professor at Harvard University; past president of the American Economic Association and the Econometric Society; chairman of Section 54, Economic Sciences, of the National Academy of Sciences; winner of the AEA's John Bates Clark Medal in 1971
John V. Krutilla	1949	Economist; known for developing the concept of existence value; winner of the 1990 Volvo Environment Prize in 1990
Michael Rothschild	1963	William Stuart Tod Professor of Economics and Public Affairs and Dean of the Woodrow Wilson School at Princeton University; known for introducing the concept of the mean-preserving spread with co-author Joseph Stiglitz
Ross Starr	N/A	Professor of Economics, University of California, San Diego (did not graduate)
Nicolaus Tideman	1965	Senior staff economist for the president's Council of Economic Advisors; professor of economics at Virginia Tech, Harvard Kennedy School, University of Buckingham, and the American Institute for Economic Research; developed the ranked-pairs voting system

==== Philosophy ====
Name	Year/degree	Notability
Sally Haslanger	1977	Ford Professor of Philosophy in the Department of Linguistics and Philosophy at the Massachusetts Institute of Technology; 2015 Spinoza Chair of Philosophy at the University of Amsterdam; recipient of the American Philosophical Association's 2014 Joseph B. Gittler Award
Lisa Kemmerer	1988	Author and professor of philosophy and religion at Montana State University Billings
Eric T. Olson	1986	Professor of Philosophy, University of Sheffield; taught at Cambridge University
Jay Rosenberg	1963	Taylor Grandy Professor of Philosophy, University of North Carolina at Chapel Hill
Sydney Shoemaker	1953	Susan Linn Sage Professor of Philosophy at Cornell University
Guy Sircello	1953	Professor of Philosophy, University of California, Irvine and scholar of aesthetics
Tom Wasow	1967	Clarence Irving Lewis Professor of Philosophy, emeritus, at Stanford University; co-founder of the Center for the Study of Language and Information
Allen W. Wood	1964	Professor of philosophy at Cornell University, Yale University, and Stanford University; Ward W. and Priscilla B. Woods Professor emeritus, Indiana University

==== Psychology and neuroscience ====
Name	Year/degree	Notability
Athena Aktipis	2002	Psychologist, director of the Human Generosity Project at Arizona State University
Daryl Bem	1960	Social psychologist and professor emeritus at Cornell University
Allen Bergin	N/A	Clinical psychologist known for his research on psychotherapy outcomes and the integration of psychotherapy and religion (did not graduate)
Jeanne Block	1947	Developmental psychologist, professor at Stanford University
Robert Frager	1961	Social psychologist, founder of the Institute of Transpersonal Psychology
Harry Harlow	N/A	Professor of psychology, University of Wisconsin–Madison, president of the American Psychological Association (did not graduate)
Herbert Jasper	1928	Professor of psychology, McGill University
Eleanor Maccoby	N/A	Professor of psychology, Stanford University, member of the National Academy of Sciences, most recognized for scholarly contributions to the fields of gender studies and developmental psychology (did not graduate)
Roberto Malinow	1979	Shiley Chair in Alzheimer's Disease Research at the University of California, San Diego
Eleanor Rosch	1960	Professor of psychology at the University of California, Berkeley; primarily known for her work on categorization, and influence on the field of cognitive psychology
Mary K. Rothbart	1962	Educational and developmental psychologist, professor at University of Oregon
M. Brewster Smith	1939	Professor of psychology, University of Chicago, past president of the American Psychological Association who testified against segregation in schools as an expert witness in the Brown v. Board of Education case (did not graduate)
Paul H. Taghert	1975	Chronobiologist, and professor of neuroscience at Washington University in St. Louis
Richard F. Thompson	1953	Behavioral neuroscientist, William M. Keck Professor of Psychology and Biological Sciences at the University of Southern California
Gina G. Turrigiano	1984	Neuroscientist, Levitan Chair of Vision Science at Brandeis University
Cyma Van Petten	1981	Cognitive neuroscientist, known for electrophysiological studies on language, memory, and cognition; professor of Psychology at the State University of New York at Binghamton

==== Biology and chemistry ====
Name	Year/date	Notability
John Alroy	1989	Paleobiologist
Michael Balls	1966	British zoologist and professor, University of Nottingham
Arlene Blum	1966	Chemist and mountaineer
Alison Butler	1977	Distinguished Professor in the Department of Chemistry and Biochemistry at the University of California, Santa Barbara
James Emory Eckenwalder	1971	Canadian botanist
Donald Engelman	1962	Biochemist, Higgins Professor of Biochemistry at Yale University
Allah Verdi Mirza Farman Farmaian	1951	Son of nobleman Abdol Hossein Mirza Farmanfarma, biologist at Rutgers University and Princeton University
R. Kip Guy	1990	Pharmaceutical chemist, dean of the University of Kentucky College of Pharmacy
Anne Hiltner	1963	Polymer scientist at Case Western Reserve University
Daniel S. Kemp	1958	Organic chemist, emeritus professor of chemistry at the Massachusetts Institute of Technology
Rachel E. Klevit	1978	Edmond H. Fischer-Washington Research Foundation Endowed Chair in Biochemistry at the University of Washington
Paul Knoepfler	1989	Biologist, writer, and blogger; professor in the Department of Cell Biology and Human Anatomy, the Genome Center, and the Comprehensive Cancer Center at the University of California, Davis School of Medicine
Arthur H. Livermore	1940	Science educator
Victor Nizet	1984	Professor of Pediatrics and Pharmacy at the University of California, San Diego
Mary Jo Ondrechen	1974	Professor of Chemistry and Chemical Biology at Northeastern University
Roger Perlmutter	1973	Biotechnologist; head of Research and Development at Amgen, Inc., former executive vice president of Merck & Co.
Mark Ptashne	1961	Molecular biologist, Ludwig Chair of Molecular Biology at Memorial Sloan–Kettering Cancer Center
Patricia Quinn	1982	Atmospheric scientist, National Oceanic and Atmospheric Administration; fellow of the American Geophysical Union; fellow of the American Academy of Arts and Sciences
Kenneth Raymond	1964	Professor of Chemistry, University of California, Berkeley
Kevan Shokat	1986	Professor and chair of Cellular and Molecular Pharmacology at University of California, San Francisco; Howard Hughes Medical Institute investigator
Stephen C. Sillett	1989	Kenneth L. Fisher Chair in Redwood Forest Ecology for the Department of Biological Sciences at Humboldt State University
Bruce Voeller	1956	Biologist, AIDS researcher, gay-rights activist; coined the term "AIDS"

==== Science, mathematics, computing, and engineering ====
- Clarence Allen, 1949 – professor of Geology, California Institute of Technology
- John Backus, 1932 – professor of Physics, University of Southern California
- Alan H. Borning, 1971 – professor of Computer Science, University of Washington
- Daniel Bump, 1974 – professor of Mathematics, Stanford University
- Theodore James Courant, 1982 – mathematician
- Craig DeForest, 1989 – astrophysicist, director of the PUNCH mission
- Shep Doeleman, 1986 – astrophysicist, director of the Event Horizon Telescope project
- David B. Dusenbery, 1964 – father of sensory ecology
- Kelly Falkner, 1983 – oceanographer, Antarctic researcher
- Thomas William Ferguson, 1965 – physician
- David Flory, 1964 – physicist; professor of Physics, chairman of the Physics Department, and director of the School of Natural Sciences at Fairleigh Dickinson University
- Cleota Gage Fry, 1933 – mathematician and professor at Purdue University
- Mark Galassi, 1987 – physicist and computer scientist, Los Alamos National Laboratory
- Jonathan Grudin, 1972 – computer scientist
- Vivian Annabelle Johnson, 1932 – professor of Physics, Purdue University
- Daniel Kottke, 1976 – computer scientist
- Jorge M. López, 1967 – mathematician and professor at the University of Puerto Rico, Río Piedras Campus
- Steven McGeady, 1980 – technologist
- Arthur Ogus, 1968 – professor of Mathematics, University of California, Berkeley
- Marilyn Olmstead, 1965 – chemist, expert in small molecule crystallography
- Catherine Otto, 1975 – physician
- Keith Packard, 1986 – software developer; known for his work on the X Window System
- Norman Packard, 1977 – chaos theory physicist
- Lawrence Philips, 1976 – software engineer; developer of the Metaphone family of phonetic encoding algorithms
- Edward Ramberg (did not graduate) – physicist
- Larry Shaw, 1961 – physicist and founder of Pi Day
- Peter Shirley, 1985 – computer scientist
- John Alexander Simpson, 1940 – professor of Physics, University of Chicago, and atomic scientist on the Manhattan Project
- Susan Subak, 1982 – environmental and climate scientist
- Irena Swanson, 1987 – mathematician and professor at Reed College

=== Arts and entertainment ===
- Jacob Avshalomov, 1941 – composer
- Stella Baker, 2015 – actor
- Jody Bleyle, 1992 – singer, songwriter, musician
- Xenia Cage, 1935 – artist and musician
- Jennifer Camper, 1979 – cartoonist
- Ry Cooder, 1971 – singer, songwriter; attended Reed for one semester
- Robert Cornthwaite, 1939 – actor
- Lamar Crowson, 1948 – pianist
- Dr. Demento, born Barret Hansen, 1963 – radio personality
- Pozzi Escot, 1956 – composer
- Johanna Fateman (did not graduate) – musician
- Simone Forti (did not graduate) – choreographer
- Rob Heinsoo, 1987 – game designer
- Matt Keeslar, 2014 – actor
- Hope Lange (did not graduate) – actress
- Jayne Loader, 1973 – writer and director; produced and co-directed The Atomic Cafe
- Peter Mars, 1982 – artist
- Robert Morris, 1953 (attended two years) – sculptor
- Bill Morrison, 1985 – filmmaker, Guggenheim fellow
- Charles Munch, 1968 – painter
- Daria O'Neill, 1993 – Portland radio and TV personality
- Eric Overmyer, 1973 – screenwriter, producer, playwright
- David Reed, 1968 – artist
- Lawrence Rinder, 1983 – director of the Berkeley Art Museum
- Brian Rolland (did not graduate) – musician
- Leo Rubinfien, 1974 – photographer
- Susan Silas, 1975 – artist
- Pat Silver-Lasky 1949– screenwriter and actress
- Morgan Spector, 2002 – actor
- Kim Spencer, 1970 – television producer
- David Henry Sterry, 1978 – author, actor/comic
- Igor Vamos, 1990 – contemporary artist, member of The Yes Men
- Anne Washburn, 1991 – playwright (Mr. Burns, A Post-Electric Play)

=== Business ===
- Suzan DelBene, 1983 – CEO of Nimble Technology and vice president at Microsoft
- Robert Friedland, 1974 – businessman and CEO of Ivanhoe Mines
- Bill Naito, 1949 – Portland businessman, developer, and civic leader
- Emilio Pucci, 1937 – fashion designer; member of the Italian Parliament

=== Food and drink ===
- James Beard, expelled 1922/23; honorary degree 1976 – chef and cookbook author
- Mark Bitterman, 1995 – food writer and author
- Kate Christensen, 1986 – food writer and author
- Steven Raichlen, 1975 – television chef, author
- Sean Thackrey (did not graduate) – winemaker

=== Government ===
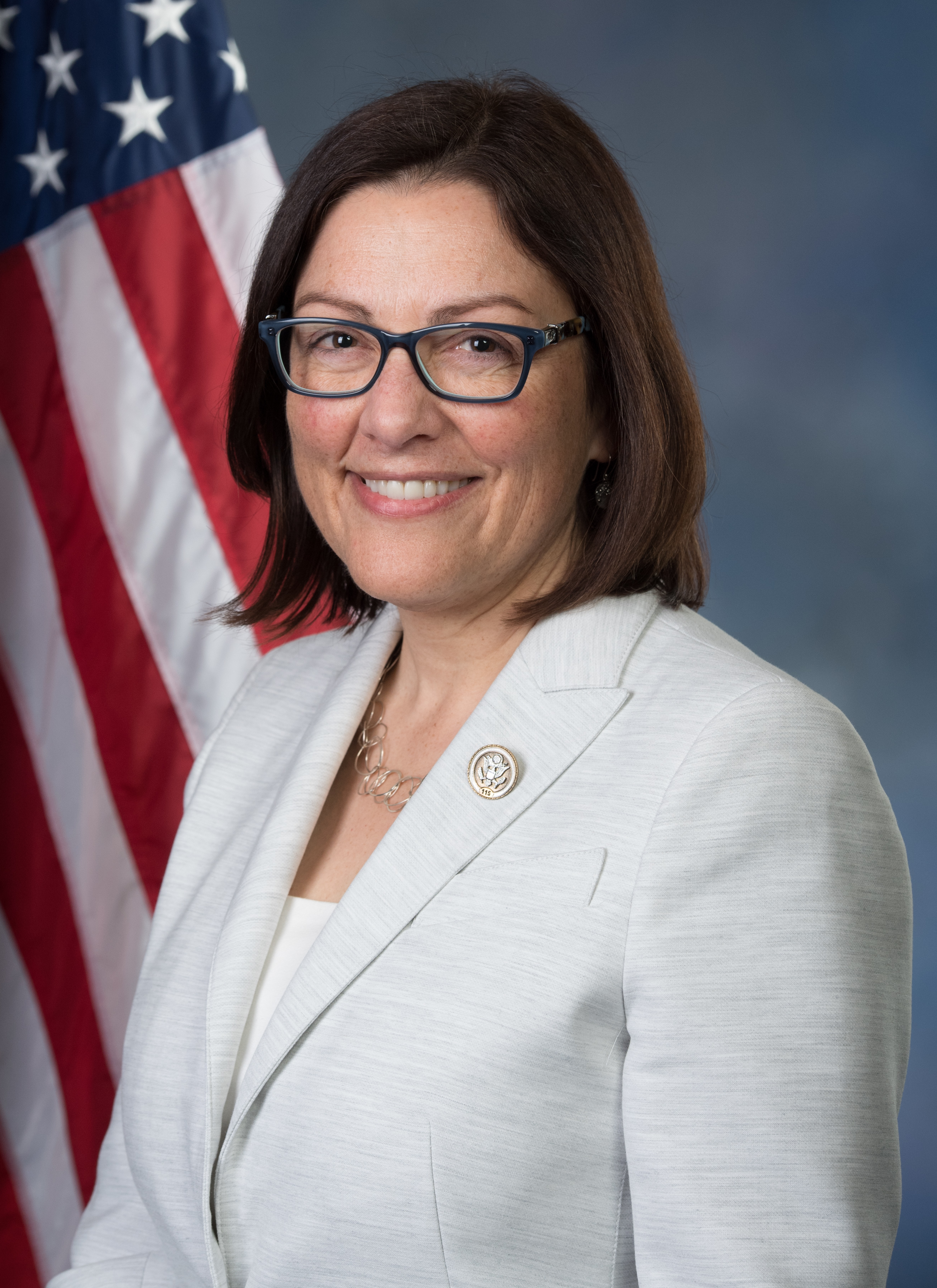
Suzan DelBene

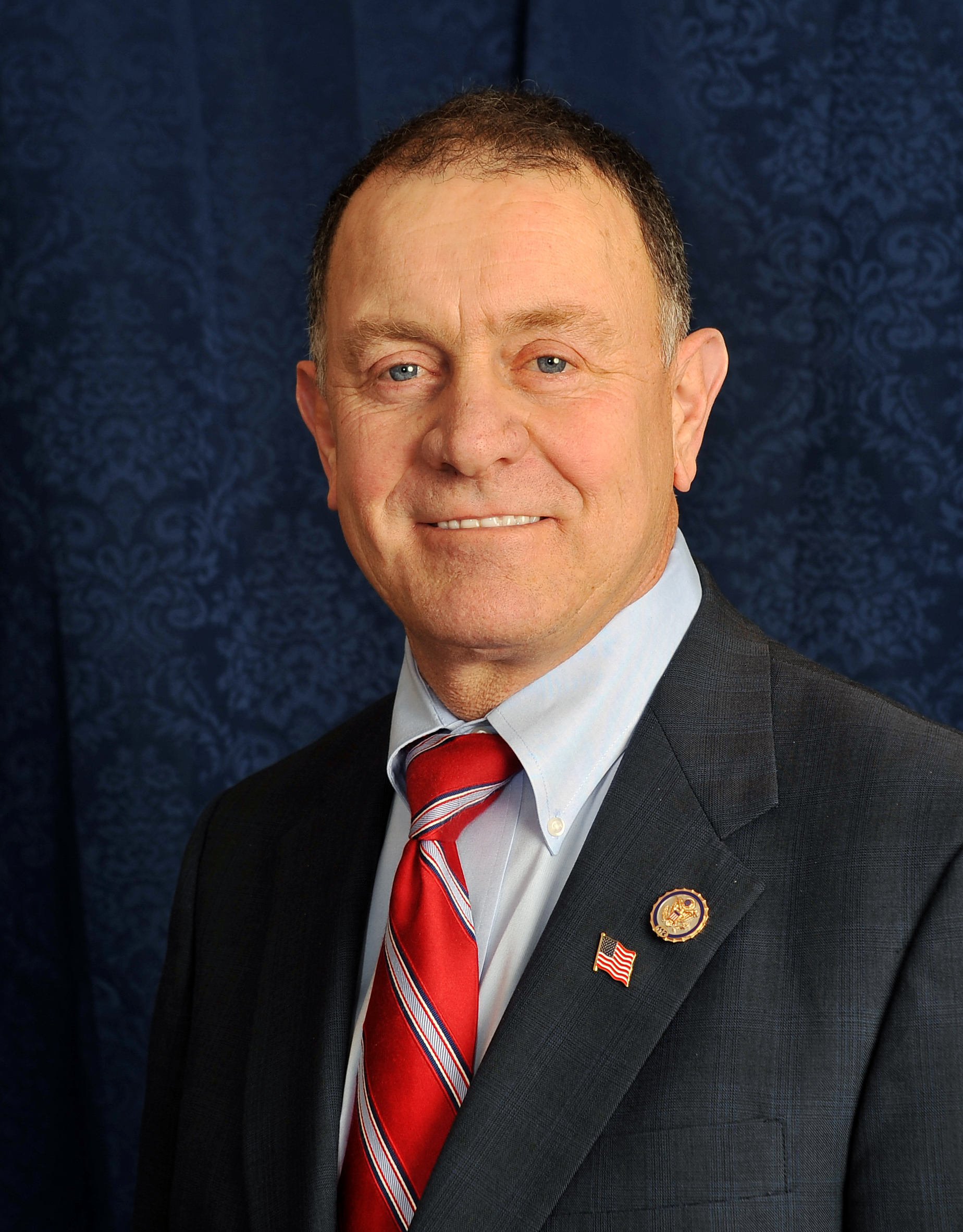
Richard L. Hanna

- Josiah H. Beeman V, 1958 – United States ambassador to New Zealand
- Bud Clark (did not graduate) – mayor of Portland
- Richard Danzig, 1965 – 71st secretary of the navy
- Suzan DelBene, 1983 – United States representative from Washington state (D)
- Chris Garrett, 1996 – member of the Oregon Legislature
- Marie Gluesenkamp Perez, United States representative from Washington state
- Richard L. Hanna, 1973 – United States representative from New York (R)
- Cordelia Hood, 1936 – Office of Strategic Services and CIA agent
- Mingus Mapps, Portland, Oregon city council member
- Sheldon T. Mills, 1927 – former United States ambassador to Afghanistan
- J. Elizabeth Mitchell, 1991 – member of the Maine Legislature
- Norman Solomon (did not graduate) – candidate for the United States House of Representatives
- Howard Wolpe, 1960 – congressman (D-Michigan)

=== Law ===
- Alafair Burke, 1991 – assistant district attorney, Multnomah County, Oregon; professor of Law, Hofstra University; crime and mystery writer
- Chris Garrett, 1996 – justice, Oregon Supreme Court
- Linda Howard, 1970 -- law professor, college counsel, corporate general counsel
- George M. Joseph, 1951 – chief judge, Oregon Court of Appeals
- Katya Komisaruk, 1978 – civil rights lawyer
- Berkeley Lent, 1948 – chief justice, Oregon Supreme Court
- Michael E. Levine, 1962 – senior lecturer at the New York University School of Law; dean emeritus of the Yale School of Management
- Paul Alan Levy, 1973 – attorney at Public Citizen specializing in Internet-related free speech issues
- Hans A. Linde, 1947 – justice, Oregon Supreme Court
- Jessica Litman, 1974 – professor of Law at the University of Michigan, legal advisor
- Alex J. Martinez, 1973 – chief justice, Colorado Supreme Court
- Gus J. Solomon (did not graduate) – US district judge, District of Oregon
- Fay Stender (did not graduate) – lawyer and prisoners' rights advocate
- Jacob Tanzer (did not graduate) – justice, Oregon Supreme Court

=== Literature ===
- Tamim Ansary, 1970 – author of West of Kabul, East of New York
- Doon Arbus, 1967 – writer and journalist, daughter of Diane Arbus
- Alison Baker, 1975 – writer
- Mary Barnard, 1932 – modernist poet and translator of Greek poet Sappho
- Margaret Bechard, 1976 – science fiction writer
- Don Berry, 1931 – writer
- Mei-mei Berssenbrugge, 1969 – poet
- Lee Blessing, 1971 – playwright
- Hob Broun, 1972 – author who became paralyzed and wrote two books by puffing air through a tube
- Alafair Burke, 1991 – author
- Robert Chesley, 1965 – playwright, novelist, and composer
- Kate Christensen, 1986 – novelist, winner of 2008 PEN/Faulkner Award for Fiction
- Gordon Dahlquist, 1984 – playwright, novelist
- William Dickey, 1951 – poet
- Katherine Dunn, 1969 – journalist and author of Geek Love
- Elana Dykewomon, ca. 1971 – author
- Elyssa East, 1994 – novelist
- David Eddings, 1954 – writer
- Scott Ellsworth, 1976 – writer and historian
- Nancy Farmer, 1963 – novelist, winner of National Book Award for Young People's Literature
- Elyse Fenton, 2003 – poet
- Janet Fitch, 1978 – novelist, White Oleander, Paint It Black, and The Revolution of Marina M
- Debra M. Ginsberg, 1984 – author
- Shadab Zeest Hashmi, 1995 – poet
- Ernest Haycox (did not graduate) – author
- Roger Hobbs, 2011 – author of Ghostman and Vanishing Games
- Laleh Khadivi, 1998 – author and writer
- Caroline B. Miller, 1959 – author
- Lisa Dale Norton, 1976 – author
- Steven Raichlen, 1975 – author and writer
- Howard Rheingold, 1968 – writer
- M. C. Richards, 1938 – poet
- David Romtvedt, 1972 – poet
- Mary Rosenblum, 1975 – author
- Vern Rutsala, 1956 – poet and writer
- Tina Satter, 2004 – playwright
- Leslie Scalapino, 1966 – poet, publisher, and playwright
- Genny Smith, 1943 – naturalist, activist, publisher
- Gary Snyder, 1951 – Pulitzer Prize winner and poet
- Vanessa Veselka, 2010 – novelist
- Sally Watson, 1950 – writer
- Lew Welch, 1950 – poet
- Philip Whalen, 1951 – poet

=== Journalism and media ===
- Adrian Chen, 2009 – journalist and former staff writer at The New Yorker
- Jim Compton, 1964 – journalist at PBS
- Ed Cony, 1948 – editor of The Wall Street Journal, winner of the Pulitzer Prize in 1961
- Barbara Ehrenreich, 1963 – journalist, political activist, author of Nickel and Dimed
- Peter S. Goodman, 1989 – reporter for the New York Times and author of Past Due: The End of Easy Money and the Renewal of the American Economy
- Michelle Nijhuis, 1996 – journalist
- Adam L. Penenberg, 1986 – writer, professor of journalism at New York University
- Howard Rheingold, 1968 – writer, critic, and virtual media theorist
- Arun Rath, 1994 – correspondent for NPR and WGBH, former weekend host of NPR's All Things Considered
- Robert Richter, 1951 – documentary filmmaker and Academy Award winner
- Sheila Rogers, 1980 – columnist and TV producer for The Late Show With David Letterman
- Anya Schiffrin, 1984 – business journalist and author of Global Muckraking: 100 Years of Investigative Reporting from Around the World
- Robert Smith, 1989 – journalist, host of NPR's Planet Money.
- Gary Wolf, 1983 – author and writer for Wired
- Peter Zuckerman, 2003 – journalist and author

=== Inventors and innovators ===
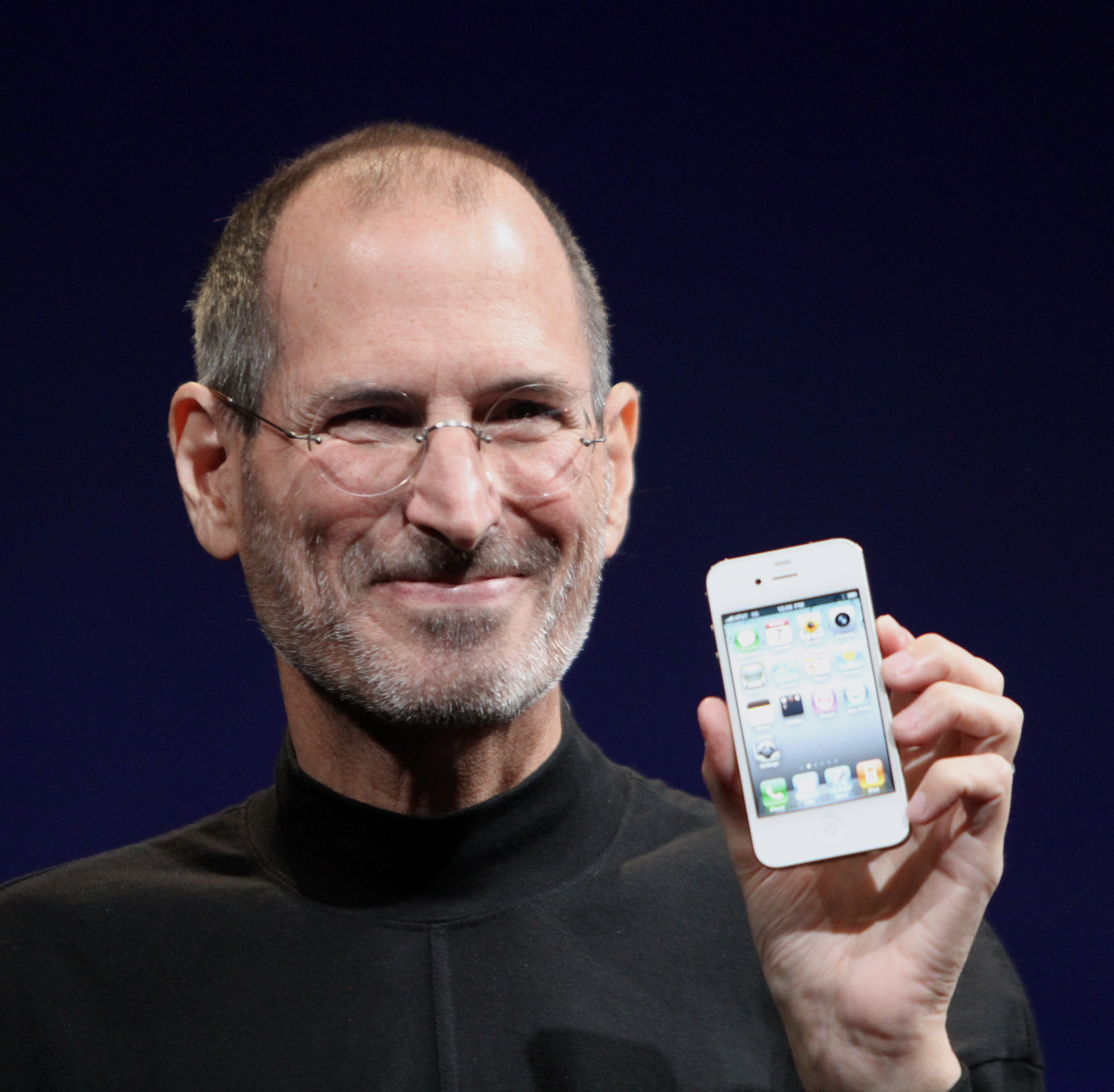
Steve Jobs

- Richard Crandall, 1969 – computer scientist who developed the irrational base discrete weighted transform used in finding large prime numbers
- Steve Jobs, 1976 (attended as a freshman, did not graduate) – Apple co-founder and former CEO; Pixar co-founder and former CEO
- Ken Koe, 1945 – co-inventor of Zoloft
- Peter Norton, 1965 – creator of Norton Utilities
- Pamela Ronald, 1982 – geneticist and developer of flood-tolerant rice
- James Russell, 1953 – inventor of the compact disc
- Larry Sanger, 1991 – co-founder of Wikipedia
- Bernard Smith, 1948 – sailboat designer
- John Sperling, 1948 – founder of the University of Phoenix
- C. Howard Vollum, 1936 – founder of Tektronix; inventor of the edge-triggered oscilloscope

=== Other ===
- Greta Christina, 1983 – blogger
- Mike Davis (did not graduate) – activist and scholar
- Randall Giles (did not graduate) – composer
- Max Gordon, 1924 – owner of the Village Vanguard
- Mukunda Goswami, 1961 – Hare Krishna guru
- Kris Holmes (did not graduate) – typeface designer
- Christopher Langan – "America's smartest man;" won a scholarship to Reed after earning a perfect SAT score, but dropped out
- Murray Leaf, 1961 – anthropologist
- Taliesin Myrddin Namkai-Meche, 2016 – human rights activist
- Joann Osterud, 1968 – aviator and stunt pilot
- Harry Wayland Randall, 1936 – member of international brigades in Spanish Civil War
- Aaron Rhodes, 1971 – human rights advocate
- Helen Sandoz – lesbian activist
- Peter Stafford (did not graduate) – author and writer
- Sumner Stone, 1967 – typeface designer
- Michael Teitelbaum, 1966 – program director and demographer at the Alfred P. Sloan Foundation
- Donald Niven Wheeler, 1936 – political activist

=== Fictional alumni ===
- Erlich Bachmann, from HBO's Silicon Valley
- John William Barry from David Guterson's 2008 novel The Other
- Bill McKay, portrayed by Robert Redford in the 1972 film The Candidate
- Donald "Don" Miller in his semi-autobiographical 2003 book Blue Like Jazz and (portrayed by Marshall Allman) in the 2012 Blue Like Jazz film
- Harald Petersen, Reed '27 from Mary McCarthy's 1963 novel The Group
- Japhy Ryder from Jack Kerouac's 1958 novel The Dharma Bums (based on Reed alum Gary Snyder)
- Hunter Scangarelo (did not graduate), friend of Meadow Soprano in the 1999–2007 television series The Sopranos
- Sierra from Charmed Thirds, Megan McCafferty's 2006 novel in the Jessica Darling series
- Lambert "Sharkey" Somers, from Judy Blume's 1998 novel Summer Sisters

== Faculty ==
- Kimberly Clausing – economist, deputy assistant secretary for tax analysis at the United States Department of the Treasury
- William J. Connell – historian
- Paul Douglas – US senator from Illinois
- David J. Griffiths – physicist
- Daniel Reisberg – psychology
- Darius Rejali – Iranian-American political scientist, specialist on the political uses of torture

== Administration ==
- Paul Bragdon – college president 1971–1988
