= Cordelia =

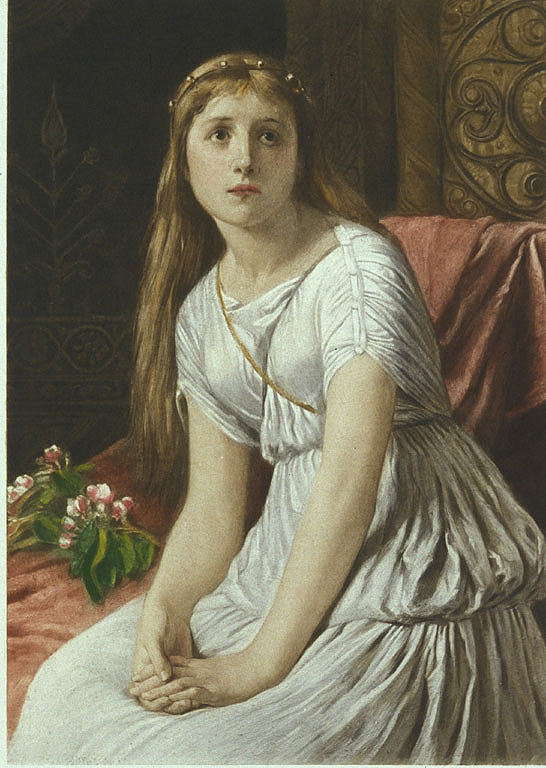
- William Frederick Yeames, Cordelia, 1888
- Gender: Feminine
- Language: English

Origin
- Origin: uncertain; possibly related to the word cordial (literally "heartfelt, from the heart")
- Meaning: allegedly "heart" or "daughter of the sea(-god)", Jewel of the Sea (Welsh)

Other names
- Nicknames: Delia, Dilly, Rory, Cordy, Lia, Danny
- Related names: Cordeilla, Cordélia, Cordell, Cordilla, Cordoylla, Cordula, Creurdilad

Cordelia is a feminine given name. It was borne by the tragic heroine of Shakespeare's King Lear (1606), a character based on the legendary queen Cordelia. The name is of uncertain origin. It is popularly associated with Latin cor (genitive cordis) "heart", and has also been linked with the Welsh name Creiddylad, allegedly meaning "jewel of the sea", but it may derive from the French coeur de lion "heart of a lion".

== Notable people with the name ==
- Cordelia of Britain, legendary queen of the Britons, youngest daughter of King Leir
- Cordelia Agbebaku (1961–2017), Nigerian academic and former vice-chancellor of Ambrose Alli University
- Cordelia Botkin (1854–1910), American murderer
- Cordelia Bugeja (born 1976), British actress
- Cordelia Cameron, Australian actor-manager
- Cordelia Camp, American educator
- Cordelia Candelaria (born 1943), American educator and writer
- Cordelia Throop Cole (1833–1900), American social reformer
- Cordelia Elizabeth Cook (1919–1996), American combat nurse
- Cordelia Adams Crawford (1865–1943), American pioneer and healer
- Cordelia Edvardson (1929–2012), German-born Swedish journalist, author and Holocaust survivor
- Cordelia Fine (born 1975), British academic psychologist and writer
- Cordelia Agnes Greene (1831–1905), physician, philanthropist and suffragist from Upstate New York
- Cordelia Griffith (born 1995), English cricketer
- Cordelia Gundolf (1917–2008), German academic and educator
- Cordelia Harvey (1824–1895), First Lady of Wisconsin Governor Louis Harvey, known for founding Civil War Orphans' homes and advocating for war field hospital conditions
- Cordelia Hawkins, eponym of the U.S. town of Cordele, Georgia
- Cordelia Hood (1913–2011), American counter-intelligence agent
- Cordelia Howard (1848–1941), American child actress
- Cordelia James, Baroness James of Rusholme (1912–2007), British educator and justice of the peace
- Cordelia Knott (1890–1974), wife of Walter Knott and founder of Mrs. Knott's Chicken Dinner Restaurant at Knott's Berry Farm
- Cordelia Scaife May (1928–2005), American heiress and philanthropist
- Cordelia Mendoza, American antiquarian and appraiser
- Cordelia Oliver (1923–2009), Scottish journalist, painter and art critic
- Cordelia Schmid (born 1967), German computer vision researcher
- Cordelia Stanwood (1865–1958), American ornithologist, wildlife photographer, artisan and writer
- Cordelia Strube (born 1960), Canadian playwright and novelist
- Cordelia Urueta (1908–1995), Mexican artist
- Cordelia Wege (born 1976), German actress
- Cordelia Wilson (1873–1953), American painter of New Mexico and American Southwest landscapes

== Fictional characters ==
- Cordelia (King Lear), a central character in William Shakespeare's tragic play King Lear
- Cordelia, the character who is the object of seduction in Kierkegaard's "Diary of a Seducer" (a long section in his book Either/Or)
- Cordelia, the main character of the eponymous Dutch adult comic strip by Belgian cartoonist "ILAH" (Inge Heremans)
- Cordelia, character in James Lapine and William Finn's 1990 off-Broadway musical Falsettoland and later its two Broadway revivals, renamed Falsettos
- Cordelia Frost, sister of Emma Frost in Marvel Comics
- Cordelia, wife of Dan Mulligan in a series of musicals written and produced by Edward Harrigan

=== Anime ===
- Cordelia Capulet, Japanese anime character in Romeo x Juliet
- Cordelia Gallo, Japanese anime character in Gosick
- Cordelia Glauca, Japanese anime character in Tantei Opera Milky Holmes
- Cordelia, Japanese anime character in Diabolik Lovers

=== Films and television shows ===
- Cordelia, the titular character in the silent film Cordelia the Magnificent
- Cordelia Abbott, in the television soap opera The Young and The Restless
- Cordelia Chase, in the television series Buffy the Vampire Slayer and Angel
- Cordelia Cupp, in the mystery television series The Residence
- Cordelia Foxx, character in American Horror Story: Coven
- Cordelia "Cody" Latimer, character in the New Zealand comedy-drama series Go Girls.
- Cordelia Winthrop Scott, from the 2011 film Monte Carlo, played by Selena Gomez
- Cordelia Thornberry, in The Wild Thornberrys

=== Literature ===
- In Anne of Green Gables, Anne requests that she be called Cordelia rather than Anne
- Cordelia Blake, title character of the Winston Graham novel Cordelia (1949)
- Cordelia Flakk, in Jasper Fforde's Lost in a Good Book
- Lady Cordelia Flyte, in Brideshead Revisited (1945) by Evelyn Waugh
- Cordelia Geard, in John Cowper Powys's novel A Glastonbury Romance (1932)
- Cordelia Gray, in two books by P. D. James
- Cordelia Kenn, in Aidan Chambers' novel This Is All: The Pillow Book of Cordelia Kenn (2005)
- Cordelia Ransom, in the Honorverse novels by David Weber
- The main character of the short story "Cordelia the Crude" by Wallace Thurman
- Cordelia Naismith Vorkosigan in the Vorkosigan Saga by Lois McMaster Bujold
- Cordelia Carstairs, protagonist of The Last Hours series by Cassandra Clare

=== Video games ===
- Cordelia, a playable character in Fire Emblem Awakening
- Cordelia, final boss in Panel de Pon
- Cordelia, youngest daughter of King Regna, in Triangle Strategy
- Cordelia Starling, older sisters of the protagonist Juliet in Lollipop Chainsaw
