= Caroline Miller =

Caroline Miller may refer to:

- Caroline Pafford Miller (1903–1992), American novelist
- Caroline Adams Miller (born 1961), American non-fiction author and life coach
- Caroline Miller (character), from Malcolm in the Middle
- Caroline Miller (politician), American politician and writer
- Caroline Miller (planner), New Zealand historian and planning professor
- Caroline Miller (soccer) (born 1991), American soccer player
- Caroline Hallowell Miller (1831–1905), American educator

== See also ==
- Caroline Millar (born 1958), Australian diplomat
