= Komisaruk =

Komisaruk (Ukrainian: Комісарук) is a surname. Notable people with the surname include:

- Barry Komisaruk (born 1941), American sexologist
- Katya Komisaruk, American lawyer
- Paul Kolton (né Komisaruk; 1923–2010), American writer
