= Kathrine S. French =

American anthropologist

- Born: June 5, 1922; Champaign, Illinois, United States
- Died: June 14, 2006 (aged 84)
- Scientific career
- Fields: Anthropology
- Workplaces: Oregon Health Sciences University; Reed College

Kathrine Story ("Kay") French (June 5, 1922 – June 14, 2006) was an American anthropologist born in Illinois. Educated in California, she studied ceremonialism and naming practices on the Warm Springs Indian Reservation in the state of Oregon. She was married to fellow anthropologist David H. French.

== Early years ==
Kathrine McCullough Story was born on June 5, 1922, in Champaign, Illinois. In 1942, she received a Bachelor of Arts in philosophy and anthropology from Pomona College in California. Her father, Russell M. Story, a political scientist, was President of the Claremont Colleges and Graduate School. At Pomona she met David H. French, who was pursuing his own anthropological career. They married in 1943, and they both pursued graduate work in anthropology at Columbia University in New York, where Americanists such as Franz Boas and Ruth Benedict were working.

== Career ==
From 1943 to 1946, the Frenches served as relocation advisers and community analysts with the War Relocation Authority, monitoring conditions at relocation centers for Japanese-Americans, as part of a program to mitigate abuses.

After David French took a teaching post at his former undergraduate institution, Reed College, in Portland, Oregon, in 1947, the couple began a decades-long involvement with the Warm Springs community. While her husband's research focused on ethnobotany and language, hers focused on naming practices and ceremonialism, in a community composed of Sahaptins, Paiutes, and -- the Frenches' specialization -- Wasco Chinookans. French received her Ph.D. from Columbia in 1955. Her unpublished dissertation is considered an important contribution to the study of ceremonialism in the region and an innovative study in the semiotic analysis of ritual.

The Frenches' fieldwork at Warm Springs often involved mentoring the inaugural fieldwork experiences of budding anthropologists and linguists (many as Reed undergraduates) such as Yvonne Hajda, Dell Hymes, Gail M. Kelly, and Michael Silverstein.

French served on the faculty of Oregon Health Sciences University in Portland from 1959 to 1980, pursuing an interest in the intersection of pediatrics, gerontology, cultural anthropology, and public policy. From 1981 until her death, she was an adjunct member of Reed's anthropology department.

In the 1980s and 1990s French and Yvonne Hajda, a former student of David French's, collaborated in a long-term study of change and continuity in ceremonialism on Warm Springs, with Wenner-Gren Foundation funding. That material still awaits publication.

== Later years ==
She collaborated with her husband on numerous projects and publications, including an important survey of naming practices, which was published after David French's death in 1994. In later years of her life she remained active in anthropology, advising students as well as taking on numerous consulting projects on behalf of tribal groups, including research for Archaeological Investigations Northwest, Inc., throughout the lower Columbia River area. Kathrine French died on June 14, 2006, of pneumonia resulting from complications from cancer.

== Selected works ==
- (1955) Culture Segments and Variation in Contemporary Social Ceremonialism on the Warm Springs Reservation, Oregon. Ph.D. dissertation, Columbia University, New York.
- (1996) (with David H. French) "Personal Names." In Handbook of North American Indians, Volume 17: Languages, ed, by Ives Goddard, pp. 200–221. Washington: Smithsonian Institution.
