= Pigment dispersing factor =

Pigment dispersing factor (pdf)

Identifiers
- Organism: D. melanogaster
- Symbol: Pdf
- Entrez: 43193
- RefSeq (mRNA): NM_079793
- RefSeq (Prot): NP_524517
- UniProt: O96690

Other data
- Chromosome: 3R: 22.28 - 22.28 Mb
Search for
- Structures: Swiss-model
- Domains: InterPro

Pigment-dispersing hormone

Identifiers
- Symbol: Pigment_DH
- Pfam: PF06324
- InterPro: IPR009396
Available protein structures:
- PDB: IPR009396 PF06324 (ECOD; PDBsum)
- AlphaFold: IPR009396; PF06324

Pigment dispersing factor (pdf) is a gene that encodes the protein PDF, which is part of a large family of neuropeptides. Its hormonal product, pigment dispersing hormone (PDH), was named for the diurnal pigment movement effect it has in crustacean retinal cells upon its initial discovery in the central nervous system of arthropods. The movement and aggregation of pigments in retina cells and extra-retinal cells is hypothesized to be under a split hormonal control mechanism. One hormonal set is responsible for concentrating chromatophoral pigment by responding to changes in the organism's exposure time to darkness. Another hormonal set is responsible for dispersion and responds to the light cycle. However, insect pdf genes do not function in such pigment migration since they lack the chromatophore.

The gene was first isolated and studied in Drosophila by Jeffrey C. Hall's laboratory at Brandeis University in 1998, and has been found to function as a neuromodulator and coupling factor in controlling circadian rhythms. A neuromodulator is a neuroregulator that can act on other neurons in close proximity or far away, altering the effect of neurotransmitters without itself initiating depolarization.

== Discovery ==
Pigment dispersing factor (pdf) was first discovered in the central nervous system of arthropods by K. Ranga Rao and John P. Riehm in 1993. They noted color changes caused by intracellular pigment movements and hypothesized that crustacean color change is caused by the dispersion of retinal chromatophore pigments. However, Hall's lab was the first to isolate and study the gene itself.

Also contributing to the discovery of pdf was German scientist Charlotte Helfrich-Forster. In 2000, she studied pdf involvement with behavioral rhythms in Drosophila. Helfrich-Forster discovered that misexpressing pdf in neurons with dorsal and central brain axon terminals affected activity rhythms. From this she concluded that pdf is a neuromodulator in the dorsal and central brain that acts upon behavioral rhythms.

Perhaps the most influential contributor to the discovery and analysis of pdf and its role in circadian systems was Paul H. Taghert. The laboratories of Paul H. Taghert, Jeff Hall, and Michael Rosbash identified a null allele of the pdf gene. In addition, they utilized the GAL4/UAS system to knock out first pdf and then the entire pdf neuron. They found that the pdf and pdf neuron knockouts resulted in the destruction of some behavioral rhythms, but not all of them. They thus concluded that PDF is likely a circadian clock output.

Recently, the Taghert lab reported that each of the five major pacemaker groups in the fly brain exhibits a daily large calcium transient. The transients are distributed across the 24 hr day such that the PDF-expressing s-LNv (small lateral neuron) peak around dawn and the LNd (which are implicated in control of the evening locomotor behavior) peak in the late day. Other pacemaker groups peak at mid-day or mid-night phases. In the absence of PDF signaling, all pacemakers still exhibit a daily calcium transient, but two groups are anomalously phase-shifted to peak in the morning, synchronous with the s-LNv. These observations indicate PDF signaling is required to produce large (many-hour) phase differences to ensure a normal sequence of temporal outputs in the circadian neural circuit.

== Gene characteristics ==
In Drosophila, the pdf gene is intronless and is located at 97B on the third chromosome. It exists in a single copy per haploid genome and the approximately 0.8 kb transcript is expressed in the Drosophila's head. The cDNA clone in flies has 1080 base pairs with a single exon. Six alleles of this gene have been reported and are found in dorsal lateral neurons and the ventral lateral neurons in the Drosophila brain and also in some abdominal ganglion neurons.

== Role in the circadian pathways ==
In the Drosophila brain, a group of cells called the lateral ventral neurons is thought to be a subset of the principal pacemaker regulating the circadian rhythm of Drosophila locomotion. Release of PDF, which is expressed by some of these specialized cells, is believed to be a primary output of oscillations within these cells, and it serves to coordinate and couple the morning and evening phases of fly behavior.

=== E and M cells ===
The 150 pacemaker neurons in Drosophila are organized into two groups of cells called M (morning) and E (evening) oscillators in the ventral and dorsal lateral neurons (LNs). These two groups of cells were first observed by Colin Pittendrigh in 1976. As indicated by their names, the two oscillators control circadian rhythm at different times of the day, yet the two must coordinate to synchronize circadian activity.

PDF is found in cells of the M oscillators and regulates the anticipatory activity of flies prior to light exposure. This anticipatory activity indicates that the flies are entrained to the light-dark schedule. PDF synchronizes phase of M oscillators, while in E oscillators PDF delays their cycling and increases their amplitude. This PDF-induced delay causes evening behaviors to peak after morning behaviors, causing an antiphasic rhythm. Stoleru et al. used mosaic transgenic animals with different circadian periods to study the two oscillators. Their study showed that M-cells periodically send a "reset" signal which determines the oscillations of the E-cells. It is believed that the reset signal is PDF, because it is M-cell specific and plays a large role in maintaining normal rhythmicity.

Morning behaviors are controlled by a subset of LN's called lateral ventral neurons (LNv). These neurons express PDF. Meanwhile, evening behaviors are controlled by a subset called lateral dorsal neurons (LNd), which do not express PDF. PDF from small lateral ventral neurons (s-LNv) is responsible for the maintenance of a free-running rhythm, while PDF from large lateral ventral neurons is not required for normal behavior. Experiments at Brandeis University have shown that PDF neuropeptide is localized in s-LNv that specifically control morning anticipatory behavior. However, it has been found that large LNv working with other circadian neurons is sufficient to rescue the morning anticipation behavior and startle response in s-LNv-ablated flies. Thus, PDF's role in setting the free-running rhythm and the timing of light-dark cycles comes from both types of lateral ventral neurons.

Further evidence of distinct E and M peaks in Drosophila was provided by Grima et al. This work confirmed that the small lateral ventral neurons, which express PDF, are necessary for the morning peak in Drosophila circadian rhythms. Flies lacking functional s-LNv did not possess a lights-on anticipatory activity for the morning peak. The evening bout of activity was advanced, demonstrating the necessity of s-LNv neurons to both establish morning rhythms and couple these rhythms to the evening activity rhythms.

Other behavioral aspects of Drosophila such as eclosion activity have been monitored with ectopic expression of pdf, which in this case is concentrated in the dorsal central brain. These alterations in expression caused severely altered rhythmic behavior in eclosion of larvae, further substantiating the evidence that PDF modulates the rhythmic control of Drosophila behavior.

=== The PDF receptor ===
The PDF receptor is necessary for rhythmicity since it acts as a binding site for PDF on the pacemaker or 'clock' neurons. The PDF receptor, along with the receptor of its mammalian homolog, vasoactive intestinal peptide (VIP), is known to be a G-protein-coupled receptor of the B1 subfamily. Flies with mutant PDF receptors are arrhythmic or show weak short-period behavioral rhythms.

In a 12:12 light-dark cycle, normal flies exhibited locomotor behavior with a morning peak around dawn and an evening peak around dusk. Loss of PDF or loss of PDF-secreting LNvs resulted in weak or no morning peak, and an approximately 2-hour advance in the evening peak in a light-dark cycle. In constant conditions, loss of the PDF receptor or PDF secreting-cells resulted in desynchrony among the clock neurons.

Seol Hee Im and Paul H. Taghert used pdfr mutant flies (pdfr3369 and pdfr5304) to engineer pdfr-GAL4 lines to show that Gal4 mediated rescue of pdfr phenotypes is insufficient to provide complete behavioral rescue. A series of GAL4 driver experiments found that any rescue experiments using Gal4-UAS system always produced incomplete rescue. Unlike pdfr-GAL4 lines however, the 70-kB pdfr-myc transgene is capable of fully rescuing the circadian behavioral deficiencies of the pdfr mutant flies. Thus, a 70 kN PDF receptor transgene leads to complete rescue of the circadian behavioral deficiencies of the pdfr mutant flies. This transgene is widely expressed among pacemakers and also found in a limited number of non pacemaker cells.

=== Circadian output ===
In a series of experiments done at Washington University School of Medicine and Brandeis University, pdf was shown to be critical for circadian output coordination. Flies mutant at the pdf gene locus displayed arrhythmic circadian oscillation. Wild type flies, over the 24-hour LD cycle, are active at dawn, quieter at midday and active again at the evening, and their rhythmic behavior persists in constant dark (DD). Flies with the pdf-null (pdf^{01}) mutation displayed disrupted circadian behavior. Locomotor activity rhythms of homozygous and hemizygous pdf^{01} flies were well entrained during LD cycles, but their evening activity peak was advanced by approximately 1 hr and they lacked anticipatory morning rhythms. However, in constant darkness free running rhythms were much less rhythmic than in wild type flies. This demonstrates PDF's role as a coupling factor between the M and E oscillators and its role in generating anticipation for morning rhythms.

Further research was conducted on selective ablation of the lateral ventral neurons that express the pdf gene. Fly lines with ablated PDF neurons were created using Gal4-UAS-regulated transgenes and crossing two fly lines: UAS-rpr control group or UAS-hid. Ablation did not affect the flies' ability to entrain to LD cycles, but their evening locomotor phases showed a 0.5 hour advance. This indicates the rpr and hid ablation individuals that were persistently rhythmic in DD showed shorter period length. In addition, utilizing time-series immunostainings, Lin et al. showed that PDF does not function to maintain circadian rhythmicity in protein levels, but rather that it is required to coordinate rhythms among the various Drosophila pacemakers. These experiments thereby confirmed the importance of the coordination role pdf expression plays in regulating circadian locomotor activity in Drosophila.

There is also evidence that the LNv neurons communicate electrically with the LNd neurons to synchronize and couple morning and evening behaviors. Wu et al.. discovered that the electrical silencing of LNv neurons by disrupting potassium gradients resulted in a phenocopy of PDF-ablated flies (pdf^{01}), indicating that signaling from LNv neurons to LNd depends both on PDF and on electrical activity of the neurons, and that these mechanisms are not independent.

In 2014, Li et al. showed that PDF synchronizes circadian clock neurons by increasing levels of cAMP and cAMP-mediated protein kinase A (PKA). Increasing cAMP and PKA stabilized levels of the period protein PER in Drosophila, which slows the clock speed in PDF receptor (PDFR) containing neurons. A light pulse caused more PER degradation in flies with pdf-null neurons than flies with wild-type neurons, indicating that PDF inhibits light-induced PER degradation. These experiments demonstrated that PDF interacts with secondary messenger components to coordinate circadian output.

PDF is also sufficient to induce high levels of timeless protein (TIM), another essential protein that regulates circadian rhythm. Studies had found that flies with mutated ion channels at the posterior dorsal neurons 1 (DN1(p)s) showed reduced anticipatory behavior and free-running rhythms. This deficit can be rescued by synapsing PDF-expressing neurons onto mutated DN1(p)s, as the elevated TIM level is enough to rescue circadian rhythm.

=== Regulation through glia ===
In 2011, Ng et al. demonstrated that glial-neural signaling may physiologically modulate pdf in a calcium dependent manner. The glial cells, specifically astrocytes, in the adult Drosophila brain physiologically regulate circadian neurons, and affect the output PDF. Separate experiments using Gal4-UAS-regulated transgenes to alter glial release of internal calcium stores, glial vesicle trafficking, and membrane gradients all produced arrhythmic locomotor activity. Immunohistochemistry staining for the peptide in the LNv dorsal projections showed a significant reduction after disruption of glial functions, suggesting that PDF transport and release are affected by glial cells.

=== As a transcriptional regulator ===
A 2016 study has shown that PDF acts on E-box promoter elements of clock genes in LNv neurons to upregulate their transcription in a time-of-day dependent manner. Using fluorescent reporter genes and live cell imaging, Sabado et al. discovered that PDF upregulated CLK/CYC (two transcription factors that are a part of the oscillator that activate Per transcription) and PER expression at night, independently of its own release in the cell. This could explain further how PDF acts to synchronize the pacemaker neurons.

== Phylogeny ==
Pdf is broadly conserved across several large invertebrate clades, most notably Ecdysozoa (molting invertebrates, including arthropods) and Lophotrochozoa (annelids, mollusks, etc.), and homologs have been identified in organisms such as mosquitos and C. elegans. PDF is not found in vertebrates, such as rodents, chimpanzees, and humans.

Pdf has also been studied in the cricket Gryllus bimaculatus; studies proved that pdf is not necessary for generating the circadian rhythm, but involved in control of nocturnal behavior, entrainment, and the fine-tuning of the free-running period of the circadian clock.

Using liquid chromatography in conjunction with several biological assays, PDF, was also isolated in the insect Leucophaea maderae, a cockroach.

Using Ca^{2+} imaging studies, researchers found two types of pacemaker cells which contained PDF in the accessory medulla, the circadian pacemaker of the cockroach, Rhyparobia maderae. Type 1 cells showed that PDF signaled via elevation of intracellular cAMP levels. In contrast, in type 2 cells PDF transiently raised intracellular Ca^{2+} levels even after blocking adenylyl cyclase activity. The researchers hypothesized that in type 1 cells PDF-dependent rises in cAMP concentrations block primarily outward K^{+} currents. This PDF-dependent depolarization could be the underlying cause of PDF-dependent phase advances of pacemaker in the cockroach. The authors proposed that PDF-dependent modulation of K^{+} and Na^{+} ion channels in coupled pacemakers causes ultradian membrane potential oscillations for efficient synchronization of pacemaker cells.

== Functional analog ==
The neuropeptide VIP is an analog of PDF instrumental for cellular and behavioral 24-hour rhythms in mammals. It is expressed in 10 percent of neurons in the SCN. In a study of VIP and VIP receptor 2 (VIPR2) knockout mice, both mutants displayed entrained activity rhythms in light-dark cycle. However, in constant darkness both models displayed poor rhythmicity (very short period), and half of the animals tested were arrhythmic.

VIP and PDF are functional analogs. VIP plays a role in synchronizing and supporting rhythmicity by diverse mammalian SCN pacemakers. Loss of PDF and VIP in free-running conditions resulted in similar behavioral phenotypes: dampened behavioral rhythm with a portion of the knockout mutants showing arrhythmicity. The molecular basis of these phenotypes was a loss in synchrony between pacemaker cells. Both knockout mutants show damped molecular oscillations; VIP knockouts show reduced mRNA levels, while PDF knockouts show reduced protein. Similar behavioral and molecular phenotypes are observed in loss of PDF and VIP receptors.

== See also ==
- Circadian rhythm
- Period (gene)
- Timeless (gene)
- Suprachiasmatic nucleus
- Chronobiology
- Neuropeptide
