= Causa Justa :: Just Cause =

Causa Justa :: Just Cause (CJJC) is a grassroots social movement organization that focuses on achieving justice for low-income residents of San Francisco and Oakland. CJJC is a collaboration between St. Peter's Housing Committee and Just Cause Oakland. CJJC is a member organization of Right to the City Alliance because it works towards housing and racial justice for African Americans and Latinos. Their approach to social justice is tackling tenant issues, immigrant rights, and housing rights through grassroots campaigns.

== History ==
CJJC started in 2010 from a merger between two community organizations: St. Peter's Housing Committee and Just Cause Oakland. Both organizations work toward housing and racial justice for Latinos and African Americans in the Oakland and San Francisco community. They strategically merged in order to improve their effectiveness as a grassroots force through consolidation of resources, streamlining of systems, and wider demographic reach.

== Current work ==
=== Housing Rights Campaign ===
The Housing Rights Campaign is CJJC's specific call-to-action to fight gentrification. CJJC aims to build the power and agency between the Black and Latino working class communities so that they can stop displacement, know their rights, and assert their power in order to keep their homes. CJJC is part of the Plaza 16th Coalicíon, which is working to ensure that a development on the corner of 16th Street and Mission Street will work for the needs of the residents, instead of the needs of the developers. CJJC has worked to push anti-tenant harassment policies on ballots in Oakland in order to bar landlords’ attempts to illegally evict tenants.

The work that CJJC has done has yielded the following successes in their community:

- Establish a rent cap in Oakland so that rent can only increase up to 10% in a given year
- Remove debt service so that property owners with negative cash flow cannot pass on as much as 95% of their loan payments to tenants
- Pass the Tenant Protection Ordinance
- Won the buyout legislation and Ellis Act relocation ordinance in San Francisco
- Pushed back timeline on a major development
- Started a movement called Yes on G

=== Immigrant Rights Campaign ===
CJJC's work with immigrant rights is done through their immigrants rights campaign committee, the body that decides on what local policy fights to take on. Their main goal is to advance the rights of immigrants and fight back against criminalization of immigrants. CJJC also has Rights Based Services that educate and reach out to the community through schools, community centers, and multi-unit buildings to help people figure out their rights.
