= Jorge M. López =

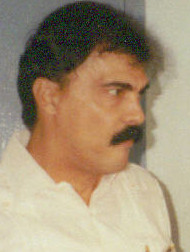
- Jorge M. López (1991)
- Born: July 15, 1943; San Juan, Puerto Rico
- Died: December 30, 2021 (aged 78); Aguas Buenas, Puerto Rico
- Education: Reed College (BA); University of Oregon (Ph.D)
- Occupation: Mathematician
- Known for: Realistic Mathematics Education
- Mother: Isabel Fernández Sánchez
- Scientific career
- Fields: Harmonic Analysis; Mathematics education
- Workplaces: Department of Mathematics, University of Puerto Rico, Río Piedras Campus
- Theses: (PhD) Fatou-Zygmund Properties on Groups (1975); (BA) Integration over Locally Compact Spaces and Haar Measure
- Doctoral advisor: Kenneth A. Ross
- Other academic advisors: Larry Edison (BA thesis)

Jorge Marcial López Fernández (1943-2021) (see Naming customs of Hispanic America) was a mathematician and mathematics educator. He directed several master theses as faculty at the Department of Mathematics, University of Puerto Rico, Río Piedras Campus which he chaired for eight years. Later he became an advocate for the Realistic Mathematics Education movement in Puerto Rico organizing influential projects in school mathematics education and publishing in academic journals.

== Biography ==
=== Early life ===
The 1950 Census registers Jorge M. López, then six years old, living in Manuel Corchado street, Santurce, San Juan, Puerto Rico, with his mother Isabel Hernández Sánchez who was a psychologist at the Hospital Maternal Infantil.

=== Education ===
Jorge López attended the then known as Escuela Modelo of the University of Puerto Rico (UPR), now University High School, in Río Piedras. In 1967 he earned a Bachelor in Arts in Mathematics at Reed College in Oregon, U.S.A.. He wrote the thesis Integration over Locally Compact Spaces and Haar Measure under the supervision of Prof. Larry Edison. At Reed he was active in student opposition to the Vietnam War.

In 1975 he earned his PhD. in Mathematics from the University of Oregon with a thesis titled Fatou-Zygmund Properties on Groups as a student of Kenneth A. Ross.

=== Death ===
Dr. López died on December 30, 2021, in the town of Aguas Buenas, Puerto Rico. A tribute was held at the La Torre building of the UPR - Río Piedras, as special honor for notable faculty.

== Professional career ==
Jorge Lopez spent his entire career as a faculty in the Mathematics Department of the UPR-Río Piedras from 1975 until his retirement in 2014. Starting from 1978 and for ten years, López, Frank Anger and Víctor M. García Muñiz supervised most of the master's theses of that institution, which was the highest degree offered at the island during that period. He was also an influential figure in mathematics education in Puerto Rico.

=== Harmonic analysis ===
During his studies at the University of Oregon, Jorge M. López co-wrote a book on Sidon sequences in harmonic analysis with Kenneth Ross. These sequences were first introduced by Simon Sidon during his Fourier series research. His collaboration with Ross continued and in 2013 Ross acknowledged this partnership in the second edition of his renowned textbook, Elementary Analysis: The Theory of Calculus, by adding the annotation In collaboration with Jorge M. López.

After obtaining his PhD, he joined the Mathematics Department at the University of Puerto Rico, Río Piedras Campus where he continued to pursue his interest in this field through the late 1980s. During this time, he directed thirteen master's theses on subjects related to Wiener's Tauberian theorem and its generalization the Gelfand representation to commutative Banach algebras, C*-algebras and locally compact Hausdorff spaces.

=== Mathematics Education ===
Jorge López had a significant impact on primary education in mathematics in Puerto Rico by the end of the twentieth century. He established the Regional Centers for Mathematical Training and Instruction (Centros Regionales de Adiestramiento e Instrucción Matemática - CRAIM) and recruited many colleagues from departments of mathematics in university campuses throughout Puerto Rico. CRAIM enriched mathematics education at K-12 levels by integrating a research-oriented approach to mathematics learning with a two-pronged strategy: by offering teachers of the Department of Education of Puerto Rico professional development and by supporting mathematical student’s research projects that were presented in science and mathematics fairs.

This approach to enhancing mathematics education had strong commonalities with the Realistic Mathematics Education (RAE) movement created by Hans Freudenthal in opposition to the new math worldwide trend. Mathematics education in Puerto Rico was based also on the new math approach. At the suggestion by the professor at the University of Wisconsin-Madison Thomas A. Romberg, Jorge López, Jan de Lange, director of the Freudenthal Institute in the Netherlands, and himself, established a collaboration on the RAE project. López became an advocate of the RAE movement in Puerto Rico. A Spanish version adapted to the Puerto Rican culture of the textbook series Mathematics in Context was written by him with the collaboration of Víctor García. By the turn of the century López established a long-lasting collaboration with professors Ana Helvia Quintero and Omar Hernández-Rodríguez that produced many publications on the subject of Realistic Mathematics and mathematics education in general.
