= Cleota Gage Fry =

American mathematician (1910–2001)

- Born: December 30, 1910; Shoshone, Idaho, U.S.
- Died: July 1, 2001 (aged 90); Lafayette, Indiana, U.S.
- Education: Reed College; Purdue University
- Occupations: Mathematician, physicist and university professor
- Known for: PhD in mathematics before World War II

Cleota Gage Fry (December 30, 1910 – July 1, 2001) was an American mathematician, physicist and university professor. She was one of the few women to earn a PhD in mathematics before World War II and was only the second person at Purdue to earn a doctorate in mathematics.

== Biography ==
Fry was born December 30, 1910 in Shoshone, Idaho and was the oldest of four children of Coral Gage and Holmes L. Fry. She attended elementary school in Portland, Oregon, and graduated from Roosevelt High School in 1929. She borrowed funding from a lawyer friend to attend Reed College and graduated with a bachelor's degree in physics in 1933 with an undergraduate thesis titled, Analysis of Textile Fibers and Fabrics. Following graduation, she boarded a train for Chicago to meet Vivian Annabelle Johnson, a friend from Reed College who had become a member of the physics department at Purdue University. Fry and Johnson settled in Lafayette, Indiana.

For her first part-time job at Purdue, she joined Dr. R. B. Abbott to work on his research on violins. She said later, "I registered for 10 hours of course work and thereby launched my graduate study. I continued helping on the research program to find out what makes a violin good."

In 1936 Fry received a master's degree from Purdue, and decided to study for her PhD in mathematics because "there was nothing else to do." She completed her doctoral degree with a minor in physics in 1939 supervised by Howard Kibble Hughes. The title of her dissertation was: Asymptotic Developments of Certain Integral Functions. Her PhD in 1939 was only the second one awarded in mathematics by Purdue.

From 1939 until her retirement, she taught mathematics and physics at various times at Purdue University in West Lafayette, Indiana. She was an assistant teacher in mathematics until 1940, a lecturer in physics until 1945, an instructor until 1947, an assistant professor until 1955 and an associate professor until 1977. She was also assistant dean at the School of Science from 1952 to 1961.

She was described by a neighbor as: "not even five feet tall, with curly hair and delicate features, a 'raving beauty.' [The neighbor] said Fry was sweet, happy, and laughed a lot." Fry died July 1, 2001 in Lafayette at 90 following a heart attack. In her will, she bequeathed funds for the need-based Cleota Gage Fry Scholarship, which is still available to students attending Reed College.

== Memberships ==
According to Green, Fry was active in several organizations.

- American Mathematical Society
- Mathematical Association of America
- American Physical Society
- Sigma Xi

== Selected publications ==
- 1942 with H. K. Hughes. Asymptotic developments of certain integral functions. Duke Math. J. 9.
- 1952: with W. L. Ayres; H. F. S. Jonah: General College Mathematics. New York, Toronto, and London: McGraw-Hill Book Co.
- 1943: with H. K. Hughes. Asymptotic developments of certain integral functions. Bull. Amer. Math. Soc. 49:45 #33. Presented by title to cancelled meeting of the AMS, New York City, 27–28 Dec 1942.
- 1946: with H. K. Hughes: Asymptotic developments of types of generalized Bessel functions. Bull. Amer. Math. Soc. 52:818 #297. Presented by H. K. Hughes to the AMS, Ithaca, New York, 22 Aug 1946.
