= James Emory Eckenwalder =

Canadian botanist

- Born: 1949 (age 76–77); Neuilly-sur-Seine, France
- Education: Reed College (BA); University of California, Berkeley (PhD)
- Scientific career
- Fields: Botany, Plant taxonomy, Macroevolution
- Workplaces: University of Toronto; Fairchild Tropical Botanical Garden; Royal Ontario Museum

James Emory Eckenwalder (born 1949 in Neuilly-sur-Seine) is a Canadian botanist. His scientific work deals with the taxonomy, hybridization, and evolution of plants. He has published 22 taxon names.

== Biography ==
James Eckenwalder was born in Neuilly-sur-Seine in France in 1949. He studied at Reed College in Portland, Oregon, where he graduated with a BA in 1971. He completed his doctoral thesis Systematics of Populus L. (Salicaceae) in southwestern North America with special reference to sect. Aigeros Duby at the University of California at Berkeley and obtained his Ph.D. in 1977. During this time he was a research assistant at the Jepson Herbarium. He started his university career at the Fairchild Tropical Botanical Garden Research Center in Miami, Florida, but after just one year he moved to the University of Toronto as an assistant professor. Since 1979, he has also been a research fellow at the Royal Ontario Museum. In 1985, he became an associate professor in the Department of Botany at the University of Toronto. Following departmental reorganizations, he became a member of the Department of Ecology and Evolutionary Biology, from which he retired as Associate Professor emeritus in 2017.

Eckenwalder is an expert in the taxonomy of poplars (Populus). Further areas of interest are cycads (Cycadales), conifers (Coniferales), morning glories (Convolvulaceae) and water hyacinth relatives (Pontederiaceae). His scientific work focuses on taxonomy, the formation of natural hybrids, paleobotany, and evolution, some of which led to significant changes in the taxonomy of conifers. His field studies have taken him to vast areas of the United States and Canada, the West Indies, Central America, South America, and Europe.
