= Vivian Annabelle Johnson =

American physicist (1912–1985)

- Born: July 1, 1912; Portland, Oregon
- Died: June 30, 1985 (aged 72); Lafayette, Indiana
- Education: Reed College; Purdue University
- Occupations: Physicist, educator
- Known for: Contributions to solid state physics

Vivian Annabelle Johnson (1912–1985) was an American physicist, professor at Purdue University and researcher in theoretical solid state physics. She worked to improve educational opportunities and the status of women.

== Biography ==
Vivian Annabelle Johnson was born July 1, 1912 in Portland, Oregon to Albert Johnson and Ada Stanley. She studied chemistry and mathematics at Washington High School and earned her B.A. in Physics from Reed College in Portland, Oregon in 1932. There, through her contacts, she was able to obtain a graduate assistantship at Purdue working for physicist Karl Lark-Horovitz who became her mentor.

She earned her master's degree at Purdue in 1934. In 1937, she worked with Lothar Wolfgang Nordheim to complete her PhD dissertation titled, the Effect of Valence Electrons on the Electron Cloud Distribution. Her early research contributed to the then-newly developing field of solid state physics. In an interview she said she "went into solid state before the field was recognized by that name." With her doctorate in hand she joined the physics faculty at Purdue being paid $700 a year, and continued her specialization into theoretical solid state physics. During the years of World War II, some of her papers became classified information. In 1973, she was named the Assistant Department Head.

Johnson also served as a visiting lecturer of the American Association of Physics Teachers and the National Science Foundation (NSF) in an effort to cultivate broader interest in physics.

In a 1955 letter, Johnson's housemate Cleota Gage Fry, describes their home life. "Vivian has told you about our house which we built together and the trips we take every summer. We occasionally knock a golf ball around Purdue's two courses. The scores are astronomical."

Johnson retired from Purdue in 1979 and died June 30, 1985. Collections of her papers can be found in Portland and at Purdue.

== Honors and awards ==
- 1973: Standard Oil Foundation Teaching Award
- 1979: Helen B Schleman Gold Medallion Award

== Memberships ==
According to American Institute of Physics, she was a member of numerous organizations.

- Sigma Xi
- Sigma Pi Sigma
- Indiana Academy of Sciences
- Phi Beta Kappa
- American Association of University Professors

== Selected publications ==
She published many articles describing the transport properties of semiconductors.

- Karl Lark-Horovitz, Vivian Annabelle Johnson, Methods of experimental physics: Solid state physics, Academic Press, 1959 ISBN 0-12-475946-7
- Johnson, Vivian Annabelle. Men of physics: Karl Lark-Horovitz: pioneer in solid state physics. Elsevier, 2013.
- Johnson, Vivian Annabelle. "The Distortion of the Atomic Charge Distribution in Zinc Oxide and Its Effect Upon Electron Diffraction Intensities." PhD diss., Purdue University, 1937.
