= Cordelia Agbebaku =

Nigerian academic (1961–2017)

Prof. Cordelia Agbebaku
- Born: January 1961; Ekpoma
- Died: February 16, 2017 (aged 56); Benin
- Spouse: Phillip Agbebaku

Cordelia Ainenehi Agbebaku (January 1961 – February 16, 2017) was a Nigerian academic and former vice-chancellor of Ambrose Alli University.

== Life ==
Agbebaku was born in Ekpoma in January, 1961. She studied law at Bendel State University now Ambrose Alli University, Ekpoma. Agbebaku became the vice-chancellor of Ambrose Alli University (AAU) officially in 2014 when her appointment was confirmed by governor Adams Oshiomhole. She had been serving in an acting capacity from 2011 while serving as the dean of faculty of law. Agbebaku died on February 16, 2017, at the University of Benin Teaching Hospital and is survived by children and husband - professor Phillip Agbebaku of the department of political science in the university.

== See also ==
- List of vice chancellors in Nigeria
