= Paul H. Taghert =

American chronobiologist (born 1953)

- Born: January 13, 1953 (age 73); Alexandria, Egypt
- Education: Reed College; University of Washington
- Scientific career
- Fields: Neurobiology; Chronobiology
- Workplaces: Washington University in St. Louis

Paul H. Taghert (born January 13, 1953) is an American chronobiologist known for pioneering research on the roles and regulation of neuropeptide signaling in the brain using Drosophila melanogaster as a model. He is a professor of neuroscience in the Department of Neuroscience at Washington University in St. Louis.

== Background ==
Taghert was born on January 13, 1953, in Alexandria, Egypt and grew up in Montclair, New Jersey. He attended Reed College from 1971 to 1975 and went on to pursue a PhD in zoology at the University of Washington in Seattle with Jim Truman. He did a postdoc under Corey Goodman at Stanford University from 1981 to 1984. As of 2016, he is a professor of neuroscience at Washington University in St. Louis and the Lab Head at the Taghert Lab at Washington University School of Medicine.

== Research contributions ==
=== Studies of PDF/PDFR in Drosophila melanogaster ===
Taghert and colleagues have identified the ~150 circadian clock neurons in the adult Drosophila melanogaster brain. Two distinct regions, the small and large ventral lateral neurons (LNv), express the neuropeptide pigment dispersing factor (PDF) and contribute to circadian locomotor activity rhythms. Taghert's group has made several contributions including the identification of mutants for the PDF neuropeptide gene - this revealed a specific behavioral syndrome indicating important contributions by this neuropeptide to normal circadian control of locomotor activity. This was the first genetic study identifying secreted substances (and not just clock elements) as critical proteins for circadian neurophysiology. This led the way to many studies by many laboratories that now evaluate how neuronal properties interweave and interact with cell intrinsic clock properties.

Taghert's work involves employing the GAL4 activation and GAL80 inhibition of PDF to study PDF's necessity as a circadian pacemaker. Experiments with the LNvs found that ablation of PDF via GAL80 inhibition only affected some aspects of behavioral rhythms, suggesting the presence of other regulators controlling circadian behavior. To further examine the peptidergic pathways regulating PDF, Taghert and his group discovered the PDF receptor (PDFR), a class B1 G protein coupled receptor. Null mutations of PDFR suggests that it is also required for circadian rhythms in Drosophila melanogaster.

=== Studies of PER and CRY in Drosophila melanogaster ===
The Taghert group also demonstrated that PDF signaling influences pacemaker cell synchronicity through PER regulation, identified the PDF receptor, and identified critical PDF receptor signaling components. They have shown that PDF receptor signals differently in different pacemaker groups, and that PDF receptor signaling interact with signals from Cryptochrome (CRY) to help sustain clock rhythmicity.

=== Studies of DIMM in Drosophila melanogaster ===
Taghert's work on DIMM addresses the genetic programs underlying neuron diversification. Through a developmental studies approach, his work explores how peptidergic neurons in Drosophila use transcriptional control mechanisms to acquire properties like the selection of a unique neuropeptide phenotype. The bHLH protein DIMM is an example of a transcriptional control mechanism that operates in neurosecretory neurons and is responsible for the cells' ability to accumulate, process, and package large amounts of secretory peptides.

DIMM confers a specific peptidergic phenotype to neurons, referred to as LEAP cells (Large cells that Episodically release Amidated Peptides). To map DIMM expression in Drosophila peptidergic systems, a large panel of peptide antibodies and gene reporters were used. It was found that there is a substantial correlation of DIMM expression with peptidergic phenotypes. At a molecular level, DIMM concerns secretory peptides that are amidated, and at a cellular level, DIMM concerns peptidergic neurons which are neurosecretory. Current research involves molecular pathways by which DIMM levels are induced in response to environmental challenges.

== Notable publications ==
- Renn, S.C.P.; J.H., Park; Rosbash, M.; Hall, J.C.; Taghert, P.H. (1999). "A pdfNeuropeptide Gene Mutation and Ablation of PDF Neurons Each Cause Severe Abnormalities of Behavioral Circadian Rhythms in Drosophila". Science. 99 (7): 781–802. doi:10.1016/S0092-8674(00)81676-1. PMID 10619432.
- Mertens, Inge; Vandingenen, Anick; Johnson, Eric C.; Shafer, Orie; Li, W.; Trigg, J.S.; De Loof, Arnold; Schoofs, Liliane; Taghert, Paul (2005). "PDF Receptor Signaling in Drosophila Contributes to Both Circadian and Biotactic Behaviors". Neuron. 48 (2): 213–219. doi:10.1016/j.neuron.2005.09.009. PMID 16242402.
