= Marilyn Olmstead =

American chemist (1943–2020)

- Born: December 8, 1943; Glendale, California
- Died: September 30, 2020 (aged 76); Davis, California
- Education: Reed College, University of Wisconsin-Madison
- Known for: Small-molecule crystallography
- Scientific career
- Fields: Chemistry, crystallography
- Institutions: University of California, Davis

Marilyn Olmstead (1943–2020) was an American chemist, an expert in small molecule crystallography and an international leader in the crystallographic study of fullerenes, or "Buckyballs." She held the position of professor emerita of chemistry at the University of California Davis.

She was elected as a Fellow of the American Chemical Society in 2014 and the American Crystallographic Association in 2017.

== Early life ==
Marilyn Olmstead was born on December 8, 1943, in Glendale, California. and graduated from Burbank High School in 1961.

== Higher education ==
Olmstead earned a B.A. in chemistry from Reed College in 1965. She attended University of Wisconsin-Madison for her graduate studies, supported by a Woodrow Wilson Fellowship. She received her Ph.D. in chemistry from Wisconsin-Madison in 1969, the only woman in her graduating class of 40 students.

== Career and discoveries ==
Olmstead started at the Department of Chemistry of the University of California, Davis in 1969 as lecturer in chemistry (1969–1975). She was subsequently appointed postdoctoral fellow (1971–1986), staff research associate (X-ray crystallography) (1986–1997), and specialist (1997–2003). By 2000, she was the in charge of a crystallographic laboratory that was one of the most productive in the world; she herself had the highest number of publications and cites of anyone in the chemistry department. Eventually, in 2003, when Marilyn was 60 years old, she was appointed to the faculty as full professor. She became a faculty member at the rank of professor Step 2 in 2003, and advanced through the system to professor, Step 6 in 2015. She became emerita in 2015.

Olmstead was a specialist in small-molecule crystallography. A focus of her research after 1990 was the structural characterization by X-ray crystallography of fullerenes, both empty and filled (endohedrals) cages, in collaboration with Alan Balch. She contributed to many of the papers that described previously undetected higher fullerenes (larger than C_{70}) (until 2018 when this record was broken) and endohedral fullerenes (those that contain encaged metals and small clusters). She pushed boundaries of crystallography, employing synchrotron radiation and ultra-low temperature data collection. Complementing her work on fullerenes and carbon nanocapsules, she also collaborated with petroleum scientists to provide definitive structural characterization of a number of the large family of diamondoid hydrocarbons found in oil wells. Structure of [123]tetramantane, a new type of σ-helical structure based on a diamondoid (nanodiamond) framework, and the structure of the first fullerene that did not obey the Isolated pentagon rule. She was also responsible for the structural characterization of the first boron-centered radical.

Olmstead served as an original co-editor of the journal Acta Crystallographica Section E from 2001 to 2011. She served in the elected positions of chair of the General Interest Group, and chair of the Continuing Education Committee in the American Crystallographic Association. She was a member of the Journal's Commission of the International Union of Crystallography. She was an elected member of the U.S. National Committee on Crystallography, a branch of the National Academy of Sciences.

In 2014 Olmstead was elected a Fellow of the American Chemical Society. In 2017, she was elected a Fellow of the American Crystallographic Association.

== Death ==
Marilyn Olmstead was killed on September 30, 2020, in a collision while cycling on a rural road north of Davis, California.
