= Lisa Dale Norton =

American author (born 1956)

- Born: July 8, 1956 (age 70); Nebraska, U.S.
- Education: Reed College; University of Iowa
- Occupation: Novelist
- Writing career
- Genre: Fiction

Lisa Dale Norton (born July 8, 1956) is an American author best known as a writer of literary nonfiction and creative nonfiction. She is the great-niece of Evelyn Maurine Norton Lincoln, U.S. President John F. Kennedy's personal secretary. Norton makes her home in Santa Fe, New Mexico.

== Early life ==
Norton grew up in Osceola, Nebraska, the daughter of Judge William Hayden Norton and Nancy Rogers Sayre Norton. Her father was a prominent member of the Democratic Party in that state, grandson of Congressman John Nathaniel Norton, and nephew to Evelyn Norton Lincoln, John F. Kennedy’s personal secretary from his years in the Senate to his assassination in Dallas. Lisa’s mother was a gifted artist and newspaper editor. Restless and a non-conformist, she presented her two children with a broad palette of ideas and the freedom to explore them. The combination of political connections and free-thinking home life nurtured an environment of possibility that led Norton from the public schools in Osceola to Reed College in Portland, Oregon, where she earned a B.A. degree. Norton completed her M.A. at the University of Iowa in Iowa City, Iowa, which she attended before the development of a university nonfiction writing program. Norton submitted a creative thesis, a work of literary journalism, in the School of Mass Communications and Journalism. That piece of writing—One Horse Town—became the genesis of her book Hawk Flies Above: Journey to the Heart of the Sandhills (Picador USA/St. Martin’s Press).

== Career ==
Norton taught at Augustana College in Rock Island, Illinois, from 1988-1993. During the 1990s, she lived on the Oregon coast where she founded and directed Neahkahnie Institute, an arts organization that offered writing workshops exploring landscape and creativity. The 1996 publication of her book Hawk Flies Above: Journey to the Heart of the Sandhills established Norton as a new and respected literary writer and a voice for environmental reform on the Great Plains of America by combining the genres of personal narrative and nature writing to issue a plea for conscious use of the waters of the Ogallala Aquifer. Norton’s experience writing Hawk Flies Above led her to an investigation of the process involved in creating compelling narratives from life experience. In 2003 she joined the faculty of the University of California, Los Angeles Extension Writers’ Program teaching creative nonfiction and memoir classes. This work led Norton to distill the essence of memoir Memoir writing. In 2008, Griffin/St. Martin’s Press published Shimmering Images: A Handy Little Guide to Writing Memoir. At that time Norton began blogging for The Huffington Post as author and story expert. Her interest involves connections between the nature and influence of narrative and contemporary culture. Norton speaks nationally about the art and craft of writing stories and the power of narrative.

== Works authored ==
- Hawk Flies Above: Journey to the Heart of the Sandhills (1996/1997)
- Shimmering Images: A Handy Little Guide to Writing Memoir (2008)
