= Patricia Quinn (atmospheric chemist) =

Atmospheric chemist

Patricia K. Quinn
- Education: University of Washington
- Scientific career
- Workplaces: NOAA's Pacific Marine Environmental Laboratory

Patricia K. Quinn is an atmospheric chemist working at the National Oceanic and Atmospheric Agency's Pacific Marine Environmental Lab. She is known for her work on the impact of atmospheric aerosol particles on air quality and climate.

== Education and career ==
Quinn has an undergraduate degree from Reed College (1982). In 1988, she earned her Ph.D. from the University of Washington and transitioned into an associate professor position there. Starting in 1993 she also has a position at the Pacific Marine Environmental Lab of the National Oceanic and Atmospheric Agency.

In 2020, Quinn was appointed the editor-in-chief of the section on 'Aerosols' for the journal Atmosphere.

== Research ==
Quinn's early research was on ammonia where she made the first simultaneous measurements of ammonia in both the atmosphere and the ocean. She then linked the cycling of sulfur and nitrogen compounds over the Pacific Ocean and examined an enhancement in cloud condensation nuclei from the oxidation of the sulfur-containing compound dimethylsulfide, research which has implications for the role of sulfur compounds on climate. She has measured aerosol chemical compounds over the Atlantic Ocean, the Pacific Ocean, and in a time series dating back to 1997 at Utqiaġvik, Alaska. Her research includes investigations into the impact of airborne pollutants in the Arctic, the contribution of sea spray aerosol to cloud condensation nuclei, and the chemistry of sea spray aerosols.

=== Selected publications ===
- Quinn, P. K.; Shaw, G.; Andrews, E.; Dutton, E. G.; Ruoho-Airola, T.; Gong, S. L. (2007). "Arctic haze: current trends and knowledge gaps". Tellus B: Chemical and Physical Meteorology. 59 (1): 99–114. Bibcode:2007TellB..59...99Q. doi:10.1111/j.1600-0889.2006.00236.x. hdl:11370/ddd9462c-f3bd-4a62-9cac-79c04f734703. ISSN 1600-0889. S2CID 218576158.
- Quinn, P. K.; Bates, T. S. (2011-12-01). "The case against climate regulation via oceanic phytoplankton sulphur emissions". Nature. 480 (7375): 51–56. Bibcode:2011Natur.480...51Q. doi:10.1038/nature10580. ISSN 0028-0836. PMID 22129724. S2CID 4417436.
- Jaeglé, L.; Quinn, P. K.; Bates, T. S.; Alexander, B.; Lin, J.-T. (2011-04-04). "Global distribution of sea salt aerosols: new constraints from in situ and remote sensing observations". Atmospheric Chemistry and Physics. 11 (7): 3137–3157. Bibcode:2011ACP....11.3137J. doi:10.5194/acp-11-3137-2011. ISSN 1680-7324.
- Bond, T. C.; Doherty, S. J.; Fahey, D. W.; Forster, P. M.; Berntsen, T.; DeAngelo, B. J.; Flanner, M. G.; Ghan, S.; Kärcher, B.; Koch, D.; Kinne, S. (2013-06-16). "Bounding the role of black carbon in the climate system: A scientific assessment: BLACK CARBON IN THE CLIMATE SYSTEM". Journal of Geophysical Research: Atmospheres. 118 (11): 5380–5552. Bibcode:2013JGRD..118.5380B. doi:10.1002/jgrd.50171. hdl:2027.42/99106. S2CID 140626771.

== Awards and honors ==
- NOAA Administrator Award (2008)
- Fellow, American Geophysical Union (2010)
- U.S. Department of Commerce Bronze Medal Award (2010)
- Fellow, American Association for the Advancement of Science (2019)
