= Katya Komisaruk =

American attorney

Katya Komisaruk is an American civil rights lawyer and social justice activist. She attended Harvard Law School, helped form the Midnight Special Law Collective and Just Cause Law Collective.

== Early years ==
Komisaruk grew up in Michigan and California. Her father is a psychiatrist and her mother a housewife. As a child in Detroit, Michigan, Komisaruk was inspired by reading about the White Rose group who resisted Nazism in Germany. "It was important to me to know that not everybody was wrong, that there were some people who did the right thing even when everybody else was failing to stop the train", she says about this early influence.

Komisaruk earned a degree from Reed College in classics, and began an MBA program at the University of California, Berkeley but was conflicted about the content, "We started doing all these case studies about things that were really immoral—clear-cutting forests, selling baby formula to people in the third world,” she says, “and I realized that the entire corporate structure works against any notion of social responsibility."

A 1982 blockade of the Lawrence Livermore National Laboratory protesting its involvement in designing nuclear weapons drew Komisaruk into civil disobedience and political activism, and she describes the preparatory trainings organized by Livermore Action Group as a personal turning point.

On June 2, 1987 Komisaruk broke into the Vandenberg Air Force Base and destroyed a mainframe computer that she believed to be part of a U.S. first-strike nuclear launch system, NAVSTAR. From a Los Angeles Times article that year:

She broke into the building and for two hours trashed a million-dollar mainframe IBM 3031 computer, hacking away at it with crowbar, bolt cutters, hammer and cordless drill. She danced on the computer chips she had pried loose, spray-painted the casing walls with slogans such as "International Law," "Nuremberg" and "Defense of Necessity," and climbed to the roof to take similar action against a satellite dish.

She left behind a bouquet of flowers, a box of Mrs. Fields cookies, and a poem: "I have no gun / You must have lots. / Let's not be hasty / No cheap shots. Please have a cookie and a nice day." Komisaruk walked off the base, hitched a ride to the Bay Area, got some legal advice and gave herself up after holding a news conference at the Federal Building in San Francisco.

In her defense, she attempted to cite the Nuremberg Principle against starting wars of aggression, although the court was not allowed to hear that argument. In fact, the judge forbade her or her attorney from using any of the terms "nuclear missile", "first strike", "Nuremberg principles", or "international law".

An extensive interview with her about the incident was published in 1988. She was also interviewed from federal prison by Pacifica radio station KPFK.

While serving a 5-year sentence, Komisaruk studied for the Law School Admission Test (LSAT) and in 1990 gained acceptance to Harvard Law School the same week she was paroled.

== Career ==
Komisaruk helped represent 600 defendants arrested in the 1999 Seattle WTO protests, mostly accused of "failure to disperse". As a volunteer for Direct Action Network, she suggested a solidarity tactic in which the alleged protestors clog the courts by insisting on a jury trial, unless the City Attorney Mark Sidran agree to a blanket deal in which all defendants are given the same treatment. 92% of the cases were dropped, and the prosecution only brought six cases to trial. Five of the tried defendants were acquitted, and the one conviction resulted in community service and a small fine.

In the follow-on 2000 Washington, D.C. protests against the World Bank and the International Monetary Fund (IMF), Komisaruk used a similar approach to get approximately 1,300 activists released with a $5 fine. In Los Angeles, activists were arrested over three days during the 2000 Democratic National Convention protests. Komisaruk documents that 50 people used solidarity tactics, refused to give their names, and went on a hunger strike until a universal plea bargain was worked out. The activists were released with suspended sentences in consideration of time served, and the prosecutor went on to publicly commend the protestors' integrity and commitment.

Leaving the Midnight Special Law Collective in 2000, Komisaruk formed Just Cause Law Collective, specializing in activist support and defense. The organization later became "Causa Justa :: Just Cause", which has changed laws in favor of renters, and fights evictions in Oakland, California.

Komisaruk's defense of a client accused of prostitution, who was caught in an undercover sting operation in Oakland, California in 2003, helped catalyze Robyn Few's bid to legalize prostitution in California. Few went on to form Sex Workers Outreach Project USA, and the Just Cause Law Collective's "Know Your Rights" materials are used to educate sex workers about their legal rights.

== Bibliography ==
- Komisaruk, Katya (2003). Beat the heat: how to handle encounters with law enforcement. Illustrations by Tim Maloney. Oakland, CA: AK Press. ISBN 978-1902593555. OCLC 55007093.
- Komisaruk, Katya (2005). "What You Should Know About Grand Juries" (PDF). San Francisco Bay Independent Media Center.
- Komisaruk, Katya (May 2009). "Solidarity Tactics in Seattle, Washington, D.C., and Los Angeles" (PDF). Organizing for Power.
