= Dennis B. McGilvray =

- Born: 1943 (age 82–83)
- Citizenship: United States
- Education: Reed College; Harvard University; University of Chicago; University of Cambridge
- Known for: Anthropology of Tamils and Muslims of south India and Sri Lanka
- Awards: Stirling Award for Contributions to Psychological Anthropology
- Scientific career
- Fields: Anthropology
- Workplaces: University of Colorado at Boulder

Dennis B. McGilvray is a professor in the Department of Anthropology in University of Colorado at Boulder. Dennis's research interest are focused on the Tamils and Muslims of south India and Sri Lanka. His research examines matrilineal Hindu and Muslim kinship, caste structure, religious ritual, and ethnic identities in the Tamil-speaking region of eastern Sri Lanka. It is also important to note that this region is deeply affected by the island's civil war. He is also interested in visual anthropology and alternative modes of cultural representation. At University of Colorado, he teaches on Tamil culture; upper division courses on symbolic anthropology, Foundations of Theory, and South Asian ethnography and a graduate seminar on Ethnography and Cultural theory.

== Publications ==
- Tsunami Recovery in Sri Lanka: Ethnic and Regional Dimensions. London and NY: Routledge, 2010 (co-editor).
- Crucible of Conflict: Tamil and Muslim Society on the East Coast of Sri Lanka. Durham, NC: Duke University Press, 2008.
- Muslim Perspectives on the Sri Lanka Conflict. Washington, DC: East-West Center, 2007, (co-author).
- Tsunami and Civil War in Sri Lanka: An Anthropologist Confronts the Real World. India Review, 2006, 5, 372–373.
- Jailani: A Sufi Shrine in Sri Lanka. In Ahmad, I. and Reifeld, H. (eds.) Lived Islam in South Asia: Adaptation, Accommodation & Conflict. Delhi: Social Science Press, 2004.
- Symbolic Heat: Gender, Health, and Worship among the Tamils of South India and Sri Lanka. Ahmedabad: Malpin Publishers, and Middletown, NJ: Grantha Corp., 1998.
- Arabs, Moors, and Muslims: Sri Lankan Muslim Ethnicity in Regional Perspective. Contributions to Indian sociology, 1998, 32, 433–483.
- The 1987 Stirling Award Essay: Sex, Repression. and Sanskritization in Sri Lanka. Ethos, 1988, 16, 99–127.
- Paraiyar Drummers of Sri Lanka: Consensus and Constraint in an Untouchable Caste. American Ethnnologist, 1983, 10, 97–115.
- Sexual Power and Fertility in Sri Lanka: Batticaloa Tamils and Moors. In MacCormack, C. P. (ed.) Ethnography of Fertility and Birth. London: Academic Press, 1982. Reprinted by Waveland Press in 1994.
- Caste Ideology and Interaction. Cambridge: Cambridge University Press, 1982 (editor).
