= David H. French (anthropologist) =

American linguist and anthropologist

David Heath French (May 21, 1918 – 1994) was an American anthropologist and linguist from Bend, Oregon. During his lifetime he was considered the foremost academic authority on the Chinookan people of the middle Columbia River, especially the Wasco-Wishram Chinooks of the Warm Springs Indian Reservation in Oregon. His research focused on ethnobotany and language.

== Education ==
French attended Reed College in Portland, Oregon, for three years (1935-1939), studying under Morris Opler. When Opler moved to Pomona College and the Claremont Graduate School, French transferred to Pomona to continue studying with him and completed his B.A. there in 1939. (He was later made an honorary alumnus of Reed.) He earned an M.A. at Claremont as well, in 1940. Around this time he did archaeological work in Oregon under Luther S. Cressman.

French's Ph.D. work at Columbia University involved studying under Ralph Linton and Ruth Benedict (he was Benedict's research assistant). He was heavily influenced by the milieu surrounding Franz Boas, who died while French was at Columbia. Later in life French always considered himself a "Boasian," an approach characterized by meticulous and thorough anthropological research in the "recovery ethnography" mode, as well as a preference for conducting linguistic and ethnographic research in tandem. He did dissertation fieldwork at Isleta Pueblo in the Southwest (1941-1942). His dissertation on factionalism at Isleta Pueblo was defended in 1943, but he did not receive his Ph.D. until 1949.

== Family and career ==
In 1943 French married Kathrine Story (1922-2006), whom he had met at Pomona and who was also pursuing a Ph.D. at Columbia.

From 1943 to 1946, the Frenches served as relocation advisers and community analysts with the War Relocation Authority, monitoring conditions at relocation centers for Japanese-Americans, as part of a program to mitigate abuses.

=== Teaching ===
French taught at Reed from 1947 until his retirement in 1988 and he presided over the establishment of Anthropology as a separate department there. Given that French's father, Delbert R. French, was a member of Reed's first graduating class (1915) (French co-founded the informal children-of-alumni group, Offspring of Reed Graduates of yesteryear, or ORGY) and that French remained involved with the Reed community (living across the street from campus) until his death, he may indeed have had a longer association with Reed College than anyone else before or since.

He also held visiting positions at Columbia University (1954-1955), the University of Washington (1959), and Harvard University (1960-1961).

In 1949, David and Kathrine French began a decades-long research involvement with the Warm Springs people. Their many contributions to Warm Springs ethnography included an exhaustive ethnobotanical inventory, numerous published articles on topics such as oral narrative and the relationship between language and culture, and a still unpublished dictionary of Wasco-Wishram (Kiksht). In the mid-1960s French facilitated the inaugural fieldwork, on Chinookan, of a young Michael Silverstein, who was later to become a leading linguist and semiotician.

The Frenches' ethnobotanical research also included fieldwork among peasants of France's Massif Central in the 1960s, accompanied by Claude Lévi-Strauss.

== Research ==
Among French's unique contributions were the inclusion in ethnobotanical surveys of which plants were not named, and, in a 1955 article, "The Concept of Culture-Bondage," an exploration of the relationship between culture and individuality which, in true Reed form, anticipated many of the concerns and ideals of the counterculture.

But his most significant publications remain a long 1961 article on culture change at Warm Springs (a monograph-length ethnographic sketch, in many ways) and several definitive articles co-authored for the Smithsonian Institution's Handbook of North American Indians, namely contributions on Plateau subsistence, naming practices, and the Wasco-Wishram-Cascades peoples. At one point he was the Reed faculty member with the most numerous publications to his credit.

Many of French's students pursued careers in anthropology or allied fields. The most prominent of these were probably Dell Hymes (anthropologist and linguist, whose research also focuses on Chinookans) and Hymes's friend the Beat Generation poet Gary Snyder. Snyder's Reed B.A. thesis (1951) was later published as a book, He Who Hunted Birds in His Father's Village: The Dimensions of a Haida Myth (1979), and it is largely thanks to French that American Indian themes and concerns with folklore and language use have enriched nearly all of Snyder's work. Snyder dedicated his book Myths and Texts to French. Other students of French's included Gail M. Kelly, May Ebihara, Katherine Verdery, Robert A. Brightman, and Robert E. Moore.

In 1988 French received the American Anthropological Association's prestigious Distinguished Service Award, his discipline's highest honor.

== Death ==
French died February 12, 1994, in Portland, Oregon.

== Selected works ==
- (1955) "The Concept of Culture-Bondage." New York Academy of Sciences, Transactions, Series II, vol. 17, no. 4, pp. 339–345.
- (1958) "Cultural Matrices of Chinookan Non-Casual Language." International Journal of American Linguistics, vol. 24, pp. 258–263.
- (1961) "Wasco-Wishram." In: Perspectives in American Indian Culture Change, edited by Edward H. Spicer, pp. 337–430. University of Chicago Press.
- (with Kathrine S. French) (1996) "Personal Names." In: Handbook of North American Indians, Volume 17: Languages, ed, by Ives Goddard, pp. 200–221. Washington: Smithsonian Institution.
- (1999) "Aboriginal Control of Huckleberry Yield in the Northwest." In Indians, Fire, and the Land in the Pacific Northwest, ed. by Robert Boyd, pp. 31–35. Corvallis: Oregon State University Press.

== Bibliography ==
- Hymes, Dell. Obituary for David H. French. Society for the Study of the Indigenous Languages of the Americas Newsletter, vol. 13, no. 1 (April 1994), pp. 1–3.
- Moore, Robert E. "Self-Consciousness, Ceremonialism, and the Problem of the Present in the Anthropology of Native North America." In: New Perspectives on Native North America: Cultures, Histories, and Representations, edited by Sergei A. Kan and Pauline Turner Strong, pp. 185–208. University of Nebraska Press, 2006.
