= Cordelia Harvey =

American Civil War nurse (1824–1895)

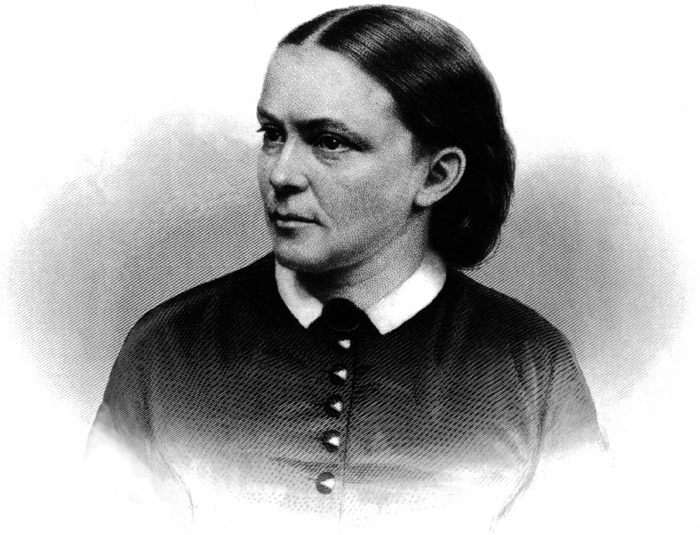
- Harvey in 1867
- Born: Cordelia Adelaide Perrine; December 27, 1824; Barre, New York, U.S.
- Died: February 27, 1895 (aged 70); Clinton Junction, Wisconsin, U.S.

Cordelia Adelaide Harvey (December 27, 1824 – February 27, 1895) is best known for her advocacy for Wisconsin Union soldiers as an American Civil War nurse. Following her involvement in the war, she took on the challenge of finding homes for children of fallen soldiers.

== Early life ==
Born on December 27, 1824, as Cordelia Adelaide Perrine, she grew up in Barre, New York. In 1842 she moved with her family to Kenosha, Wisconsin Territory, where they owned a prosperous farm. It was there that she taught school until 1845, when she met fellow teacher Louis P. Harvey. The two were married that same year, and briefly moved to Clinton Junction, Wisconsin, where Louis Harvey owned and operated a county store.

Their next home was in Shopiere, Rock County Wisconsin, where they had one daughter who died in infancy. Once Louis was elected secretary of state in 1859, they moved to Madison, Wisconsin. Cordelia became the 7th First Lady of Wisconsin when her husband was elected governor in 1861. After only 94 days in office, he drowned on April 19, 1862, in the Tennessee River while visiting wounded soldiers from Wisconsin in the South. The last letter Cordelia received from her husband, dated two days before his death, he wrote, "Yesterday was the day of my life. Thank God for the impulse that brought me here. I am well, and have done more good by coming, than I can well tell you." Cordelia received the devastating news while aiding a destitute family in Madison.

== Wisconsin Angel ==
Following the death of her husband, Cordelia decided she must finish the work he had begun with wounded soldiers. It was at this time she was appointed an agent of the Western Sanitary Committee at St. Louis. In this new position, she visited Union Military Hospitals along the Mississippi River and Wisconsin Regiment Hospitals. At each stop, she would send for supplies to treat the numerous needs of her patients. On one of her tours, she caught camp fever and had to return north to recover.

After a quick recovery, Harvey would not be dissuaded in her conviction that wounded soldiers should have the same chance to recover in their home state. She was met with resistance, as army harbored the belief that soldiers would desert if they left the camps. Harvey argued that the soldiers were more likely to die, than to leave. With the humid, disease-ridden air, ill-staffed hospitals, and insufficient food the south proved to be a death sentence for most.

Harvey traveled to the White House to speak with President Abraham Lincoln and Secretary of War Edwin Stanton on the matter, but they refused to alter their procedures. It was not until her fifth visit that she was finally able to persuade them to authorize the construction of hospitals away from the front. Three hospitals were built in Wisconsin as a result of her efforts- one in Milwaukee, another in Prairie du Chien, and the final one in Madison, which was named Harvey United States Hospital. When she returned to the front, she was recognized by the black cape she often wore. She was referred to as the "Wisconsin Angel" by soldiers, both Union and Confederate alike.

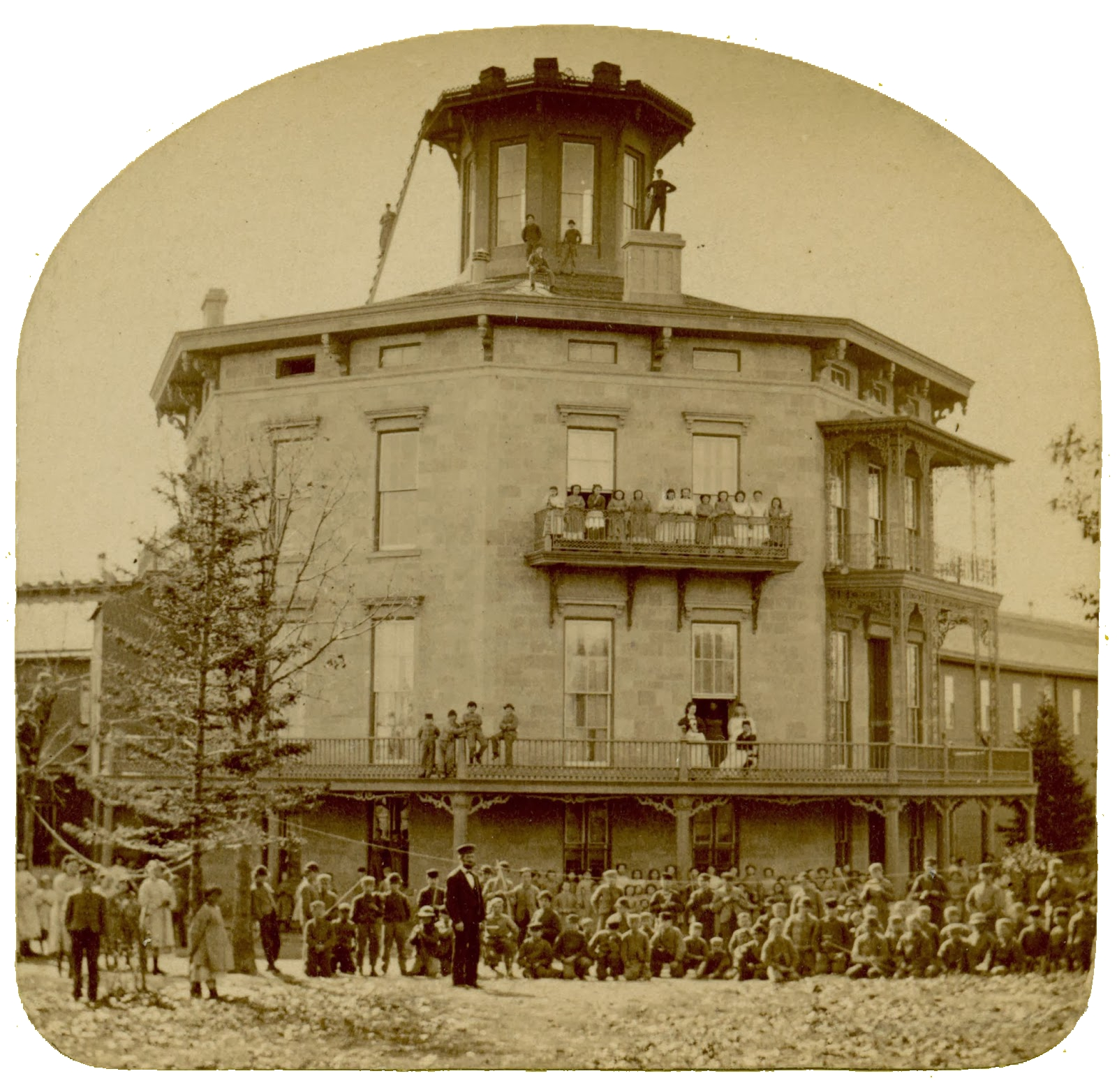
Soldiers' Orphans Home, formerly Harvey Hospital in Madison

Just a few years after the war, the book Woman's Work in the Civil War: A Record of Heroism, Patriotism and Patience in which Harvey is recognized, "In years to come, the war-scarred veteran will recount to listening children around the domestic hearth, along with many a thrilling deed of valor performed by his own right arm, the angel visits of this lady to his cot, when languishing with disease, or how, when ready to die, her intercessions secured him a furlough, and sent him home to feel the curative power of his native air and receive the care of loving hands and hearts." The Harvey Hospital in Madison had treated over 630 patients by the time the war ended.

Once the war ended, Harvey took it upon herself to find homes for the children who lost fathers on the battlefield. When the Harvey hospital closed in 1865, she decided it was perfectly suited for a children's home. She convinced the government to purchase the building for $10,000. Through private donations, she furnished and operated the home, opening its doors on January 10, 1866. The building housed dormitories as well as a classroom for 150 students, and an infirmary. Harvey began with 84 children as the superintendent, and had as many as 300 at certain times. As the children were placed in foster care the numbers dropped to just 40, and the home was closed in 1875. In the nine years it was open, 683 children between the ages of 9 and 14 called it home.

== Final years ==
After the home closed, she married Reverend Albert Chester in 1876, and lived with him in Buffalo, New York until his death. She then moved back to her and Louis' home in Wisconsin, where she taught Sunday School. On February 27, 1895, Cordelia died at the age of 70. She was buried next to her first husband in Madison.

Today, there is a historical marker near Kenosha that reads "Cordelia A. P. Harvey: Wisconsin women rallied to support the Union during the Civil War. They became nurses, hospital matrons, sanitary agents and ministers. C. A. P. Harvey attained national prominence for her role in promoting convalescent aid for sick and wounded soldiers."
