= Caroline Miller (planner) =

New Zealand university professor, urban planner and author

Caroline Miller is a New Zealand environmental planner and historian. She is a professor at Massey University, Palmerston North, and is the author of New Zealand’s first book on planning history; The Unsung Profession.

== Biography ==
Caroline Miller graduated from the University of Auckland with a BA. She worked for the Palmerston North City Council as a planning practitioner.

Having obtained a BRP, Miller went on to complete a PhD thesis on the history of the planning profession in New Zealand from 1900-1933. Her continued research interest in planning history led to the release of The Unsung Profession in 2007. Other research interests include urban planning generally, and the relationship between local government structures and planning practice.
