= Cordelia Hood =

American counter-intelligence agent

- Born: Dodson; 1913; Portland, Oregon
- Died: 2011 (aged 97–98)
- Occupation: Counter-intelligence officer

Cordelia Hood (née Dodson) (1913–2011) was an American counter-intelligence officer with the Office of Strategic Services (O.S.S.) during the Second World War and was employed by the Central Intelligence Agency for similar work during the Cold War.

A native of Portland, Oregon, Cordelia Dodson graduated from Reed College in 1936 and then completed a Master's Degree in German at Reed.

She married a fellow CIA officer William J. Hood, who was chief of station in Frankfurt and later West Berlin during the 1950s. Trento in his research found that Mrs. Hood was considered a very competent officer.

She later divorced Hood, but remained in the CIA until she retired in 1970. After that she continued to work on contract with the CIA for another decade.

She died of respiratory failure at her home in Damariscotta, Maine, on July 14, 2011.
