= Gail M. Kelly =

American anthropologist

Gail M. Kelly (February 9, 1933 – August 17, 2005) was an American anthropologist known for training generations of anthropologists at Reed College in Portland, Oregon.

She was born February 9, 1933, in Deer Park, Washington and after her mother's death was raised by relatives in Portland. She attended Reed as an undergraduate, studying under Morris Opler and David H. French, graduating in 1955. Her B.A. thesis, Themes in Wasco Culture, was based on fieldwork on the Warm Springs Indian Reservation under French's supervision. She pursued a Ph.D. in anthropology at the University of Chicago, where she was strongly influenced by Edward Shils and Fred Eggan. She completed an M.A. thesis on Northwest Coast Indians under Eggan and then shifted to a focus on Africa and on British social anthropology. She did fieldwork in Ghana and Britain beginning in 1958 and received her Ph.D. in 1959.

She taught at Reed from 1960 until her retirement in 2000. Although she did not remain an active fieldworker or continue to publish, she trained approximately 50 students who went on to pursue Ph.D.s in anthropology. Her interests and coursework focused on Émile Durkheim, Max Weber, witchcraft, the anthropology of religion, millennialism, Melanesia, and consumption.

She died August 17, 2005, in Portland.
