= Caroline Miller (politician) =

American novelist and politician

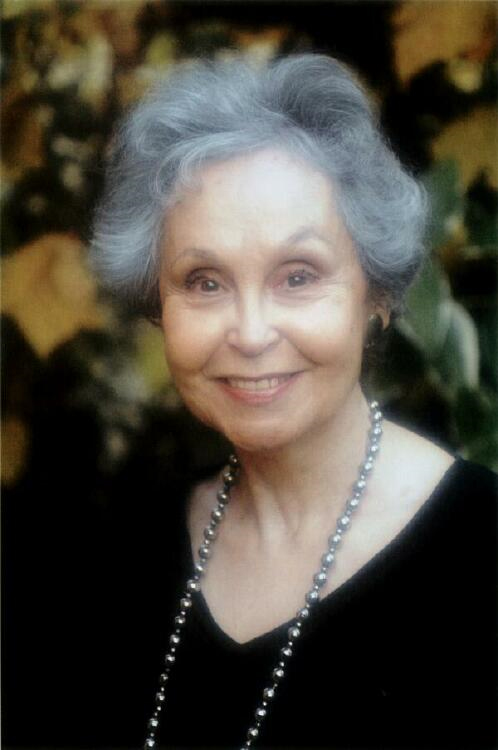
- Occupations: Politician, author

Caroline Miller is a former elected member of the county commission of Multnomah County, Oregon in the United States, and a published author. Since leaving the political arena, Miller has been a prolific writer. She has published three novels: Trompe l'Oeil in 2012, Gothic Spring and Heart Land in 2009. Her short stories have been published in Children's Digest and Grit and Tales of the Talisman, and her short story, Under the Bridge and Beneath the Moon, were dramatized for radio in Oregon and Washington. Miller's two-act play, "Woman on the Scarlet Beast," was performed by the Post5 Theatre company in Portland, Oregon Jan 20-Feb.8 2015.

During her political life, Miller served a term as an original councilor with Metro. She was elected to two consecutive four-year terms (the maximum permitted) as a member of the Multnomah County Commission, leaving office in 1988. Miller was a strong advocate for citizen involvement in government, created many social services for those in need, including ex-offenders, created a Bill of Rights for patient care in assisted living facilities and initiated the program for health care clinics in the schools in conjunction with Portland Public Schools. She was the first Hispanic to serve on the Multnomah County Board of Commissioners. She also headed the Portland Federation of Teachers. She was the first woman parliamentarian for the Oregon AFL conventions and was inducted into the Oregon Labor Hall of Fame.

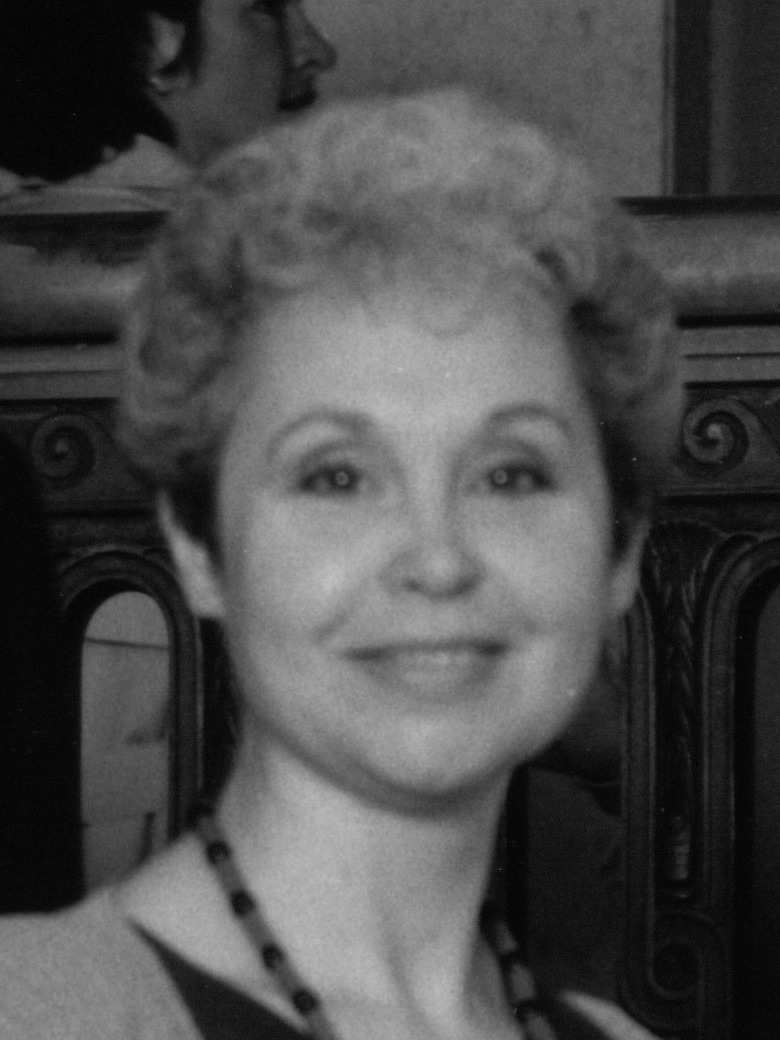
Miller in 1987 while on the Multnomah County Commission

She holds a B.A. and M.A.T. degree from Reed College and an M.A. in Literature from Northern Arizona University where she graduated with honors.

== Bibliography ==
=== Novels ===
- — (2012). Gothic Spring. Koho Pono Press. Republished by Rutherford Classics, 2017
- — (2012). Tromp l'Oeil. Koho Pono Press. Republished by Rutherford Classics, 2017
- — (2015). Heart Land. Koho Pono Press. Republished by Rutherford Classics, 2017
- — (2016). Ballet Noir. Black Rose Writing. Republished by Rutherford Classics, 2017
- — (2023). Getting Lost To Find Home. Rutherford Classics.
- — (2025). Grimahlka and Other Fantasies. Rutherford Classics.

=== Play ===
- Woman on the Scarlet Beast produced by the Post5 Theatre in Portland, Oregon, January 20, 2015 - February 8, 2015.

=== Stories ===
- The Christmas Eve of Doubting Thomas Young American 2/11/89 vol. 5, number 25, Dec. 12, 1988 TX 2-746-004
- Under the Bridge and Beneath the Moon Children's Digest Vol. 38 Number 368 12/1988 TX2-746-003
- Yearnings 1994 Oregon English Journal XV11 number 2 Fall 1994 TX3-978-620
- Saying Goodbye 1996 The Advocate Vol. 11, No. 1 Feb/March 1997 TX4-539-268
- The Summer of the Burlap Bag 2000 Grab a Nickel XXVII, Vol. 1 Summer 2000 TX5-290-796l
- Bodacious Scurvy 2000 Caprice XIV #2 Summer 2000 (An excerpt from Angel McBride and the Sonja Henie Doll.) TX5-313-975
- Doll Purchase was Meant to Be 2003 Grit Vol. 121, Number 16 Dec. 1, 2003 TX5-902-667
- Grimahlka Tales of the Talisman 3/007 Volume 11, Issue 4, March 2007 TX6-538-658
- Proverbs Mosaic June 2007, 46th edition
- Marie Eau-Claire published by The Colored Lens May 1, 2012
- Agent of God published by WolfSinger Publications in its anthology, Under a Dark Sign, October 2015
- Gustav Pavel published by Fixional, July 2017
- Secrets published in Adelaide, Sept 2017 Vol 9
