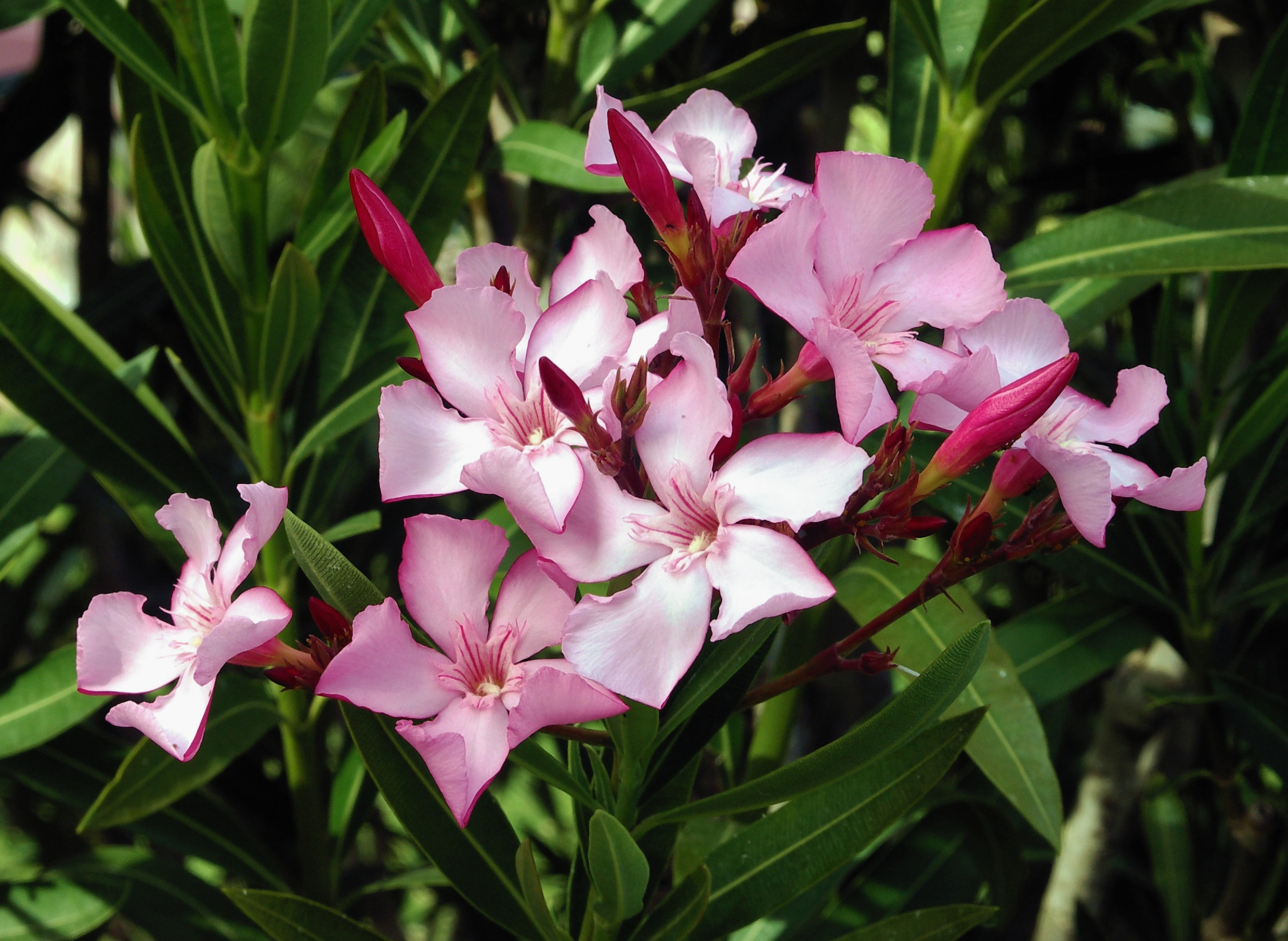

Conservation status
- Least Concern (IUCN 3.1)

Scientific classification
- Kingdom: Plantae
- Clade: Tracheophytes
- Clade: Angiosperms
- Clade: Eudicots
- Clade: Asterids
- Order: Gentianales
- Family: Apocynaceae
- Subfamily: Apocynoideae
- Tribe: Nerieae
- Genus: Nerium; L.
- Species: N. oleander

Binomial name
- Nerium oleander L.

Synonyms
- Numerous, see text

= Nerium =

Oleander

Species of plant commonly known as oleander

Nerium oleander, the oleander, is a shrub or small tree native to the Mediterranean region east to southern Asia, from Morocco and Portugal east to India and Myanmar; the Flora of China also cites it as native in Yunnan in China. It is the only species currently classified in the genus Nerium, belonging to subfamily Apocynoideae of the dogbane family Apocynaceae. It is also cultivated widely in temperate and subtropical areas as an introduced ornamental and landscaping plant.

It is tolerant to both drought and inundation, but not to prolonged frost. It is a highly poisonous plant but its bitterness renders it unpalatable to humans and most animals, so poisoning cases are rare and the general risk for human mortality is low. Ingestion of larger amounts may cause nausea, vomiting, excess salivation, abdominal pain, bloody diarrhoea and irregular heart rhythm. Prolonged contact with sap may cause skin irritation, eye inflammation and dermatitis.

== Description ==
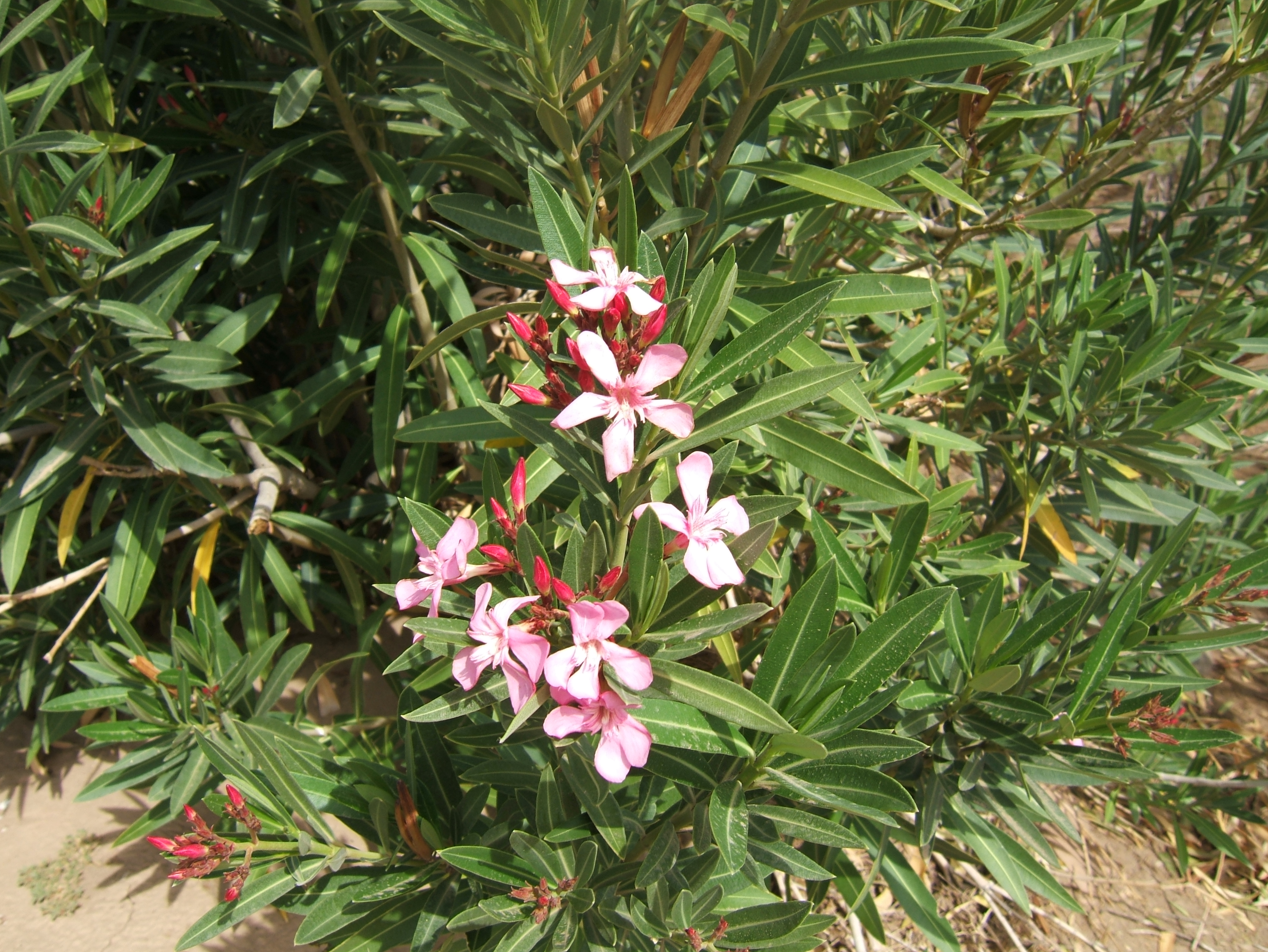
Wild Nerium oleander in a wadi east of Ouarzazate in Morocco

Oleander grows to 2–6 metres (7–20 feet) tall, with erect stems that splay outward as they mature; first-year stems have a glaucous bloom, while mature stems have a greyish bark. It is most commonly grown in its natural shrub form, but can be trained into a small tree with a single trunk. The leaves are in pairs or whorls of three, thick and leathery, dark-green, narrow lanceolate, 5–21 centimetres (2–8 inches) long and 1–3.5 cm (3/8–1 3/8 in) broad, and with an entire margin filled with minute reticulate venation web typical of eudicots. The leaves are light green and very glossy when young, maturing to a dull dark green.

The flowers grow in clusters at the end of each branch; they are 2.5–3 cm (1–1 in) diameter, pink, with a deeply 5-lobed fringed corolla round the central corolla tube in natural wild plants. White to dark red, larger (to 5 cm diameter), and double-flowered, cultivars are also common in cultivation. (Note: The "yellow oleander" is Cascabela thevetia) They are often, but not always, sweet-scented. (Note: In the past, scented plants were sometimes treated as the distinct species N. odorum, but the character is not constant and it is no longer regarded as a separate taxon.) The fruit is a long narrow pair of follicles 5–23 cm (2–9 in) long, which splits open at maturity to release numerous downy seeds.

== Taxonomy ==
Nerium oleander is the only species currently classified in the genus Nerium. It belongs to (and gives its name to) the small tribe Nerieae of subfamily Apocynoideae of the dogbane family Apocynaceae. The genera most closely related thus include the equally ornamental (and equally toxic) Adenium G.Don and Strophanthus DC., both of which also contain (like oleander) potent cardiac glycosides that have led to their use as arrow poisons in Africa. The three remaining genera Alafia Thouars, Farquharia Stapf and Isonema R.Br. are less well known in cultivation.

=== Synonymy ===
The plant has been described under a wide variety of names that are today considered synonymous:

- Oleander Medik.
- Nerion Tourn. ex St.-Lag.
- Nerion oleandrum St.-Lag.
- Nerium carneum Dum.Cours.
- Nerium flavescens Spin
- Nerium floridum Salisb.
- Nerium grandiflorum Desf.
- Nerium indicum Mill.
- Nerium japonicum Gentil
- Nerium kotschyi Boiss.
- Nerium latifolium Mill.
- Nerium lauriforme Lam.
- Nerium luteum Nois. ex Steud.
- Nerium madonii M.Vincent
- Nerium mascatense A.DC.
- Nerium odoratissimum Wender.
- Nerium odoratum Lam.
- Nerium odorum Aiton
- Nerium splendens Paxton
- Nerium thyrsiflorum Paxton
- Nerium verecundum Salisb.
- Oleander indica (Mill.) Medik.
- Oleander vulgaris Medik.

=== Etymology ===
The taxonomic name Nerium oleander was first assigned by Linnaeus in 1753. The genus name Nerium is the Latinised form of the Ancient Greek name for the plant nẽrion (νήριον), which is in turn derived from the Greek for water, nẽros (νηρός), because of the natural habitat of the oleander along rivers and streams.

The origins of the species name are disputed. The word oleander appears as far back as the first century AD, when the Greek physician Pedanius Dioscorides cited it as one of the terms used by the Romans for the plant. Merriam-Webster believes the word is a Medieval Latin corruption of Late Latin names for the plant: arodandrum or lorandrum, or more plausibly rhododendron (another Ancient Greek name for the plant), with the addition of olea because of the superficial resemblance to the olive tree (Olea europaea). (Note: Cf. oleaster) Another theory posited is that oleander is the Latinised form of a Greek compound noun: οllyo (ὀλλύω) 'I kill', and the Greek noun for man, aner, genitive andros (ἀνήρ, ἀνδρός). ascribed to oleander's toxicity to humans.

The etymological association of oleander with the bay laurel has continued into the modern day: in France the plant is known as "laurier rose", while the Spanish term, "Adelfa", is the descendant of the original Ancient Greek name for both the bay laurel and the oleander, daphne, which subsequently passed into Arabic usage and thence to Spain.

The ancient city of Volubilis in Morocco may have taken its name from the Berber name alili or oualilt for the flower.

It is also sometimes known as rose laurel, be-still tree, or rosebay.

== Distribution and habitat ==
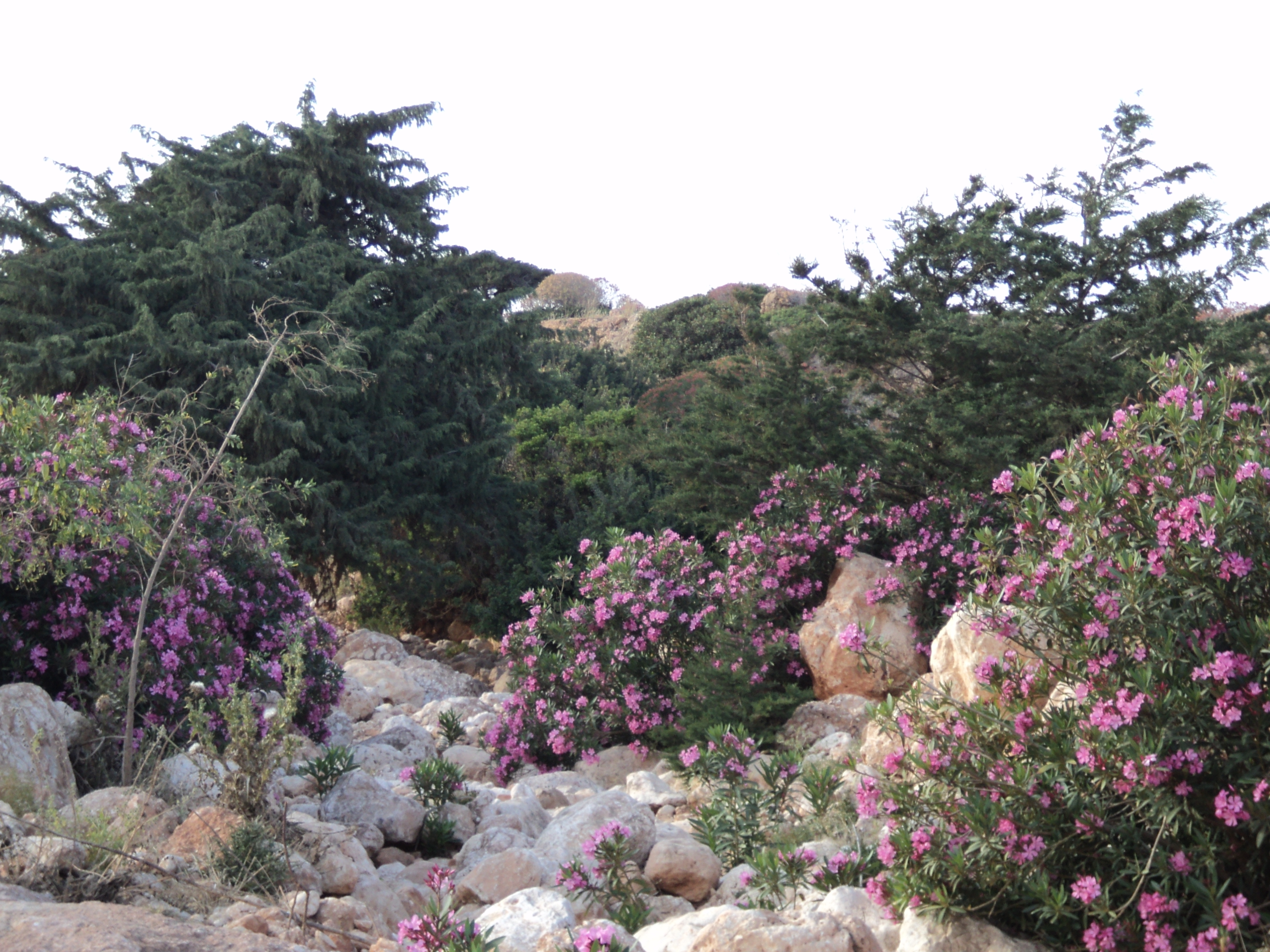
Oleander growing wild in a wadi in Libya

Nerium oleander is either native or naturalised to a broad area from northwest Africa through the Mediterranean region and warmer areas of the Black Sea region, Arabian Peninsula, southern Asia, and as far east as Yunnan in southern parts of China. It can be found in tropical, subtropical, and temperate regions. The plant typically occurs in dry locations with a lot of sun near stream beds where it can alternatively tolerate long seasons of drought and inundation from winter rains.

== Ecology ==
Some invertebrates are known to be unaffected by oleander toxins, and feed on the plants. Caterpillars of the polka-dot wasp moth (Syntomeida epilais) feed specifically on oleanders and survive by eating only the pulp surrounding the leaf-veins, avoiding the fibres. Larvae of the common crow butterfly (Euploea core) and oleander hawk-moth (Daphnis nerii) also feed on oleanders, and they retain or modify toxins, making them unpalatable to potential predators such as birds, but not to other invertebrates such as spiders and wasps.

The flowers require insect visits to set seed, and seem to be pollinated through a deception mechanism. The showy corolla acts as a potent advertisement to attract pollinators from a distance, but the flowers are nectarless and offer no reward to their visitors. They therefore receive very few visits, as typical of many rewardless flower species. Fears of honey contamination with toxic oleander nectar are therefore unsubstantiated.

=== Leaf scorch ===
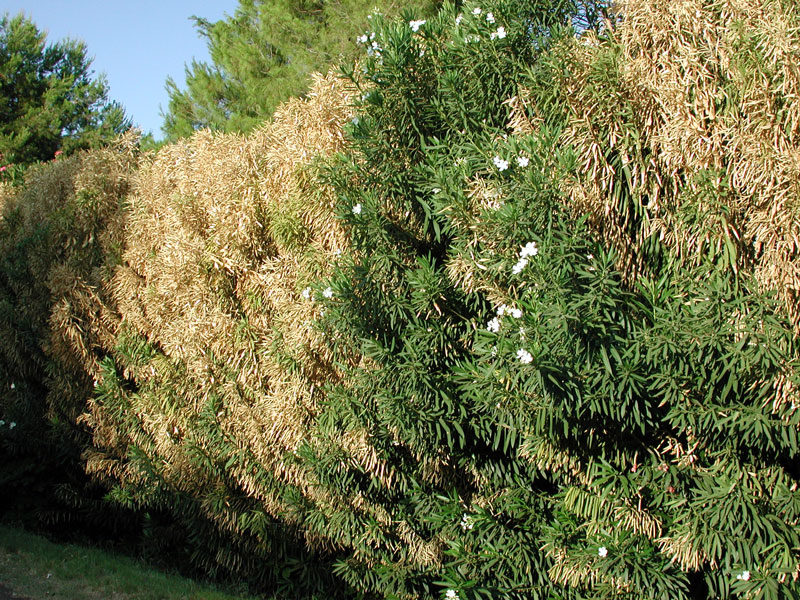
Infected with X. fastidiosa in Phoenix

A bacterial disease known as oleander leaf scorch (Xylella fastidiosa subspecies sandyi) has become a serious threat to the shrub since it was first noticed in Palm Springs, California, in 1992. The disease has since devastated hundreds of thousands of shrubs mainly in Southern California, but also on a smaller scale in Arizona, Nevada and Texas. The culprit is a bacterium which is spread via insects (the glassy-winged sharpshooter primarily) which feed on the tissue of oleanders and spread the bacteria. This inhibits the circulation of water in the tissue of the plant, causing individual branches to die until the entire plant is consumed.

Symptoms of leaf scorch infection may be slow to manifest themselves, but it becomes evident when parts of otherwise healthy oleanders begin to yellow and wither, as if scorched by heat or fire. Die-back may cease during winter dormancy, but the disease flares up in summer heat while the shrub is actively growing, which allows the bacteria to spread through the xylem of the plant. As such it can be difficult to identify at first because gardeners may mistake the symptoms for those of drought stress or nutrient deficiency.

Pruning out affected parts can slow the progression of the disease but not eliminate it. This malaise can continue for several years until the plant completely dies; there is no known cure. The best method for preventing further spread of the disease is to prune infected oleanders to the ground immediately after the infection is noticed.

The responsible pathogen was identified as the subspecies sandyi by Purcell et al., 1999.

== Cultivation ==
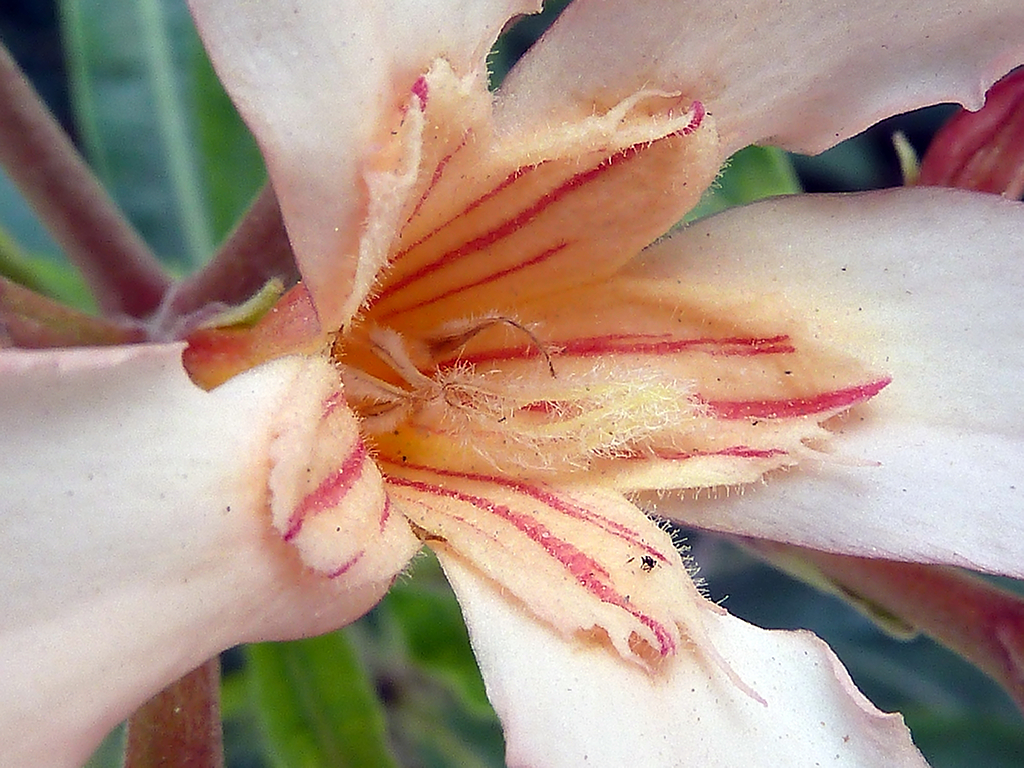
Detail of the candy-striped corona and feathery style of a single peach-coloured flower

Beyond the traditional Mediterranean and subtropical range of oleander, the plant can also be cultivated in mild oceanic climates with the appropriate precautions. It is grown without protection in warmer areas in Switzerland, southern and western Germany and southern England and can reach great sizes in London and to a lesser extent in Paris due to the urban heat island effect. This is also the case with North American cities in the Pacific Northwest like Portland, Seattle, and Vancouver. Plants may suffer damage or die back in such marginal climates during severe winter cold but will rebound from the roots.

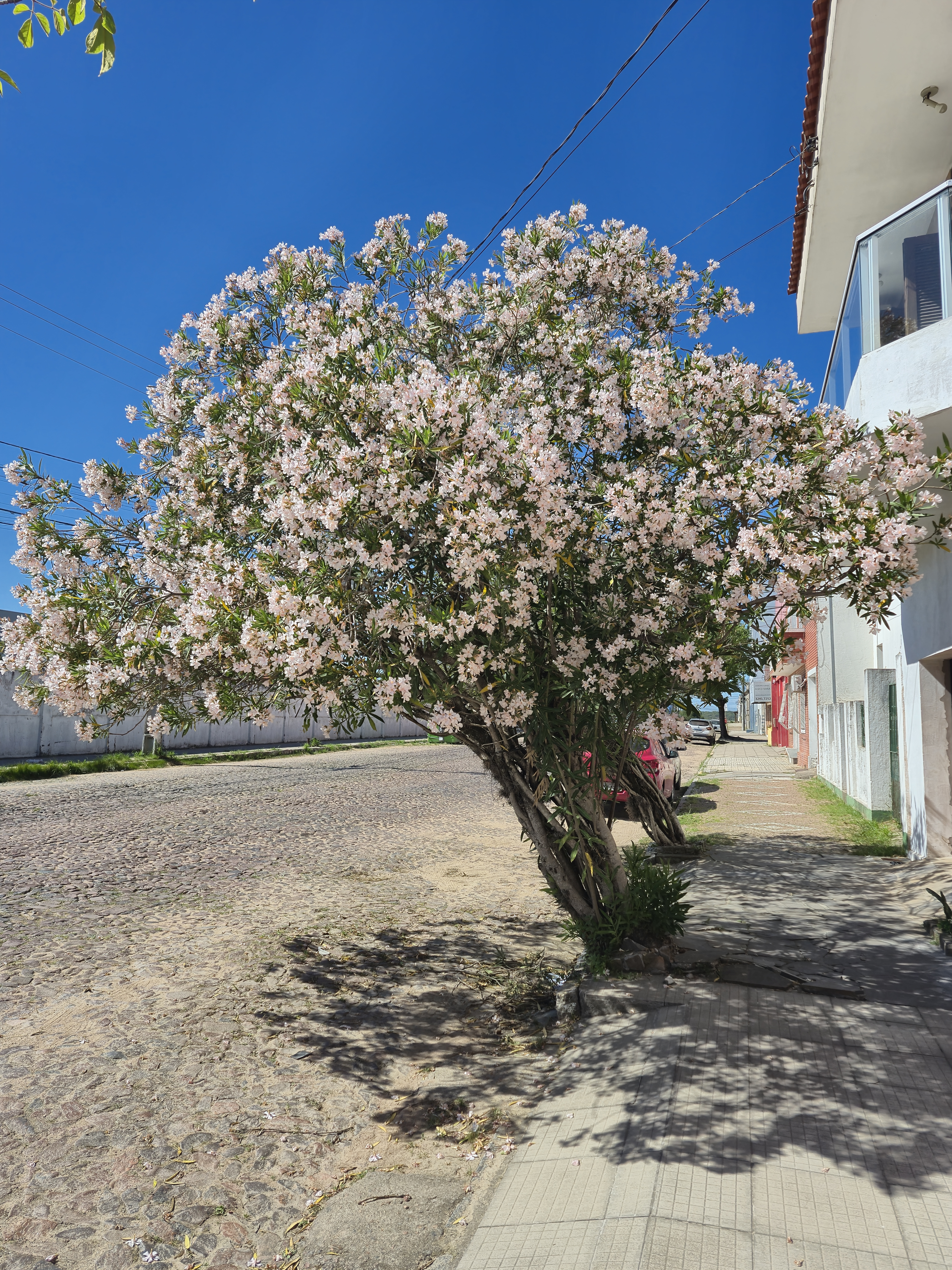
Tree in Brazil, with white flowers only

On the East Coast of the United States, it grows as far north as Virginia Beach, while in California and Texas miles of oleander shrubs are planted on median strips. There are estimated to be 25 million oleanders planted along highways and roadsides throughout the state of California. Because of its durability, oleander was planted prolifically on Galveston Island in Texas after the disastrous Hurricane of 1900. They are so prolific that Galveston is known as the 'Oleander City'; an annual oleander festival is hosted every spring. Moody Gardens in Galveston hosts the propagation program for the International Oleander Society, which promotes the cultivation of oleanders. New cultivars are hybridised and grown on the Moody Gardens grounds, encompassing every named cultivar.

=== History ===
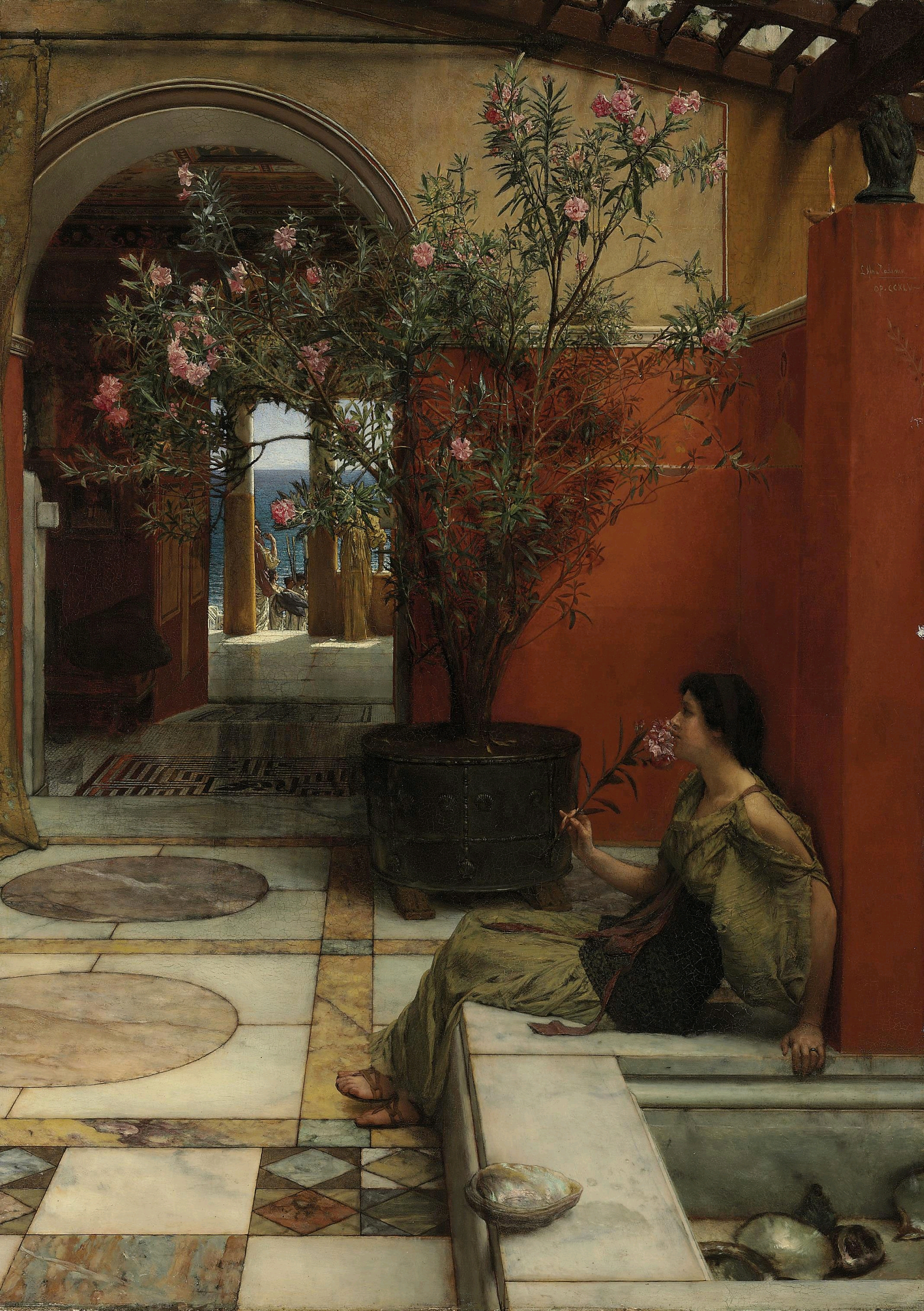
An Oleander, an 1882 painting by Lawrence Alma-Tadema.

Nerium oleander has a history of cultivation going back millennia, especially amongst the great ancient civilisations of the Mediterranean Basin. Some scholars believe it to be the rhodon (rose), also called the "Rose of Jericho", mentioned in apocryphal writings (Sirach 24:14) dating between 450 and 180 BC.

The ancient Greeks had several names for the plant, including rhododaphne, nerion, rhododendron and rhodon. Pliny the Elder said that the Romans had no Latin word for the plant, but used the Greek terms instead. Pedanius Dioscorides states in his 1st century AD pharmacopeia De Materia Medica that the Romans used the Greek rhododendron but also the Latin Oleander and Laurorosa. The Egyptians apparently called it scinphe, the North Africans rhodedaphane, and the Lucanians (a southern Italic people) icmane.

Both Pliny and Dioscorides stated that oleander was an effective antidote to venomous snake bites if mixed with rue and drunk. However, both rue and oleander are poisonous themselves, and consuming them after a venomous snake bite can accelerate the rate of mortality and increase fatalities.

A 2014 article in the medical journal Perspectives in Biology and Medicine posited that oleander was the substance used to induce hallucinations in the Pythia, the female priestess of Apollo, also known as the Oracle of Delphi in Ancient Greece. According to this theory, the symptoms of the Pythia's trances (enthusiasmos) correspond to either inhaling the smoke of or chewing small amounts of oleander leaves, often called by the generic term laurel in Ancient Greece, which led to confusion with the bay laurel that ancient authors cite.

In his book Enquiries into Plants of circa 300 BC, Theophrastus described (among plants that affect the mind) a shrub he called onotheras, which modern editors render oleander: "the root of onotheras [oleander] administered in wine", he alleges, has a beneficial effect on mood:

The root of onotheras [oleander] administered in wine makes the temper gentler and more cheerful. The plant has a leaf like that of the almond, but smaller, and the flower is red like a rose. The plant itself (which loves hilly country) forms a large bush; the root is red and large, and, if this is dried, it gives off a fragrance like wine.

In another mention, of "wild bay" (Daphne agria), Theophrastus appears to refer to the same shrub.

Oleander was a very popular ornamental shrub in Roman peristyle gardens; it is one of the plants most frequently depicted on murals in Pompeii and elsewhere in Italy. These murals include the famous garden scene from the House of Livia at Prima Porta outside Rome, and those from the House of the Wedding of Alexander and the Marine Venus in Pompeii.

Carbonised fragments of oleander wood have been identified at the Villa Poppaea in Oplontis, buried by the eruption of Mount Vesuvius in 79 AD. They were found to have been planted in a decorative arrangement with citron trees (Citrus medica) alongside the villa's swimming pool.

Herbaria of oleander cultivars are compiled and held at the Smithsonian Institution in Washington, D.C., and at Moody Gardens in Galveston, Texas.

=== Ornamental gardening ===
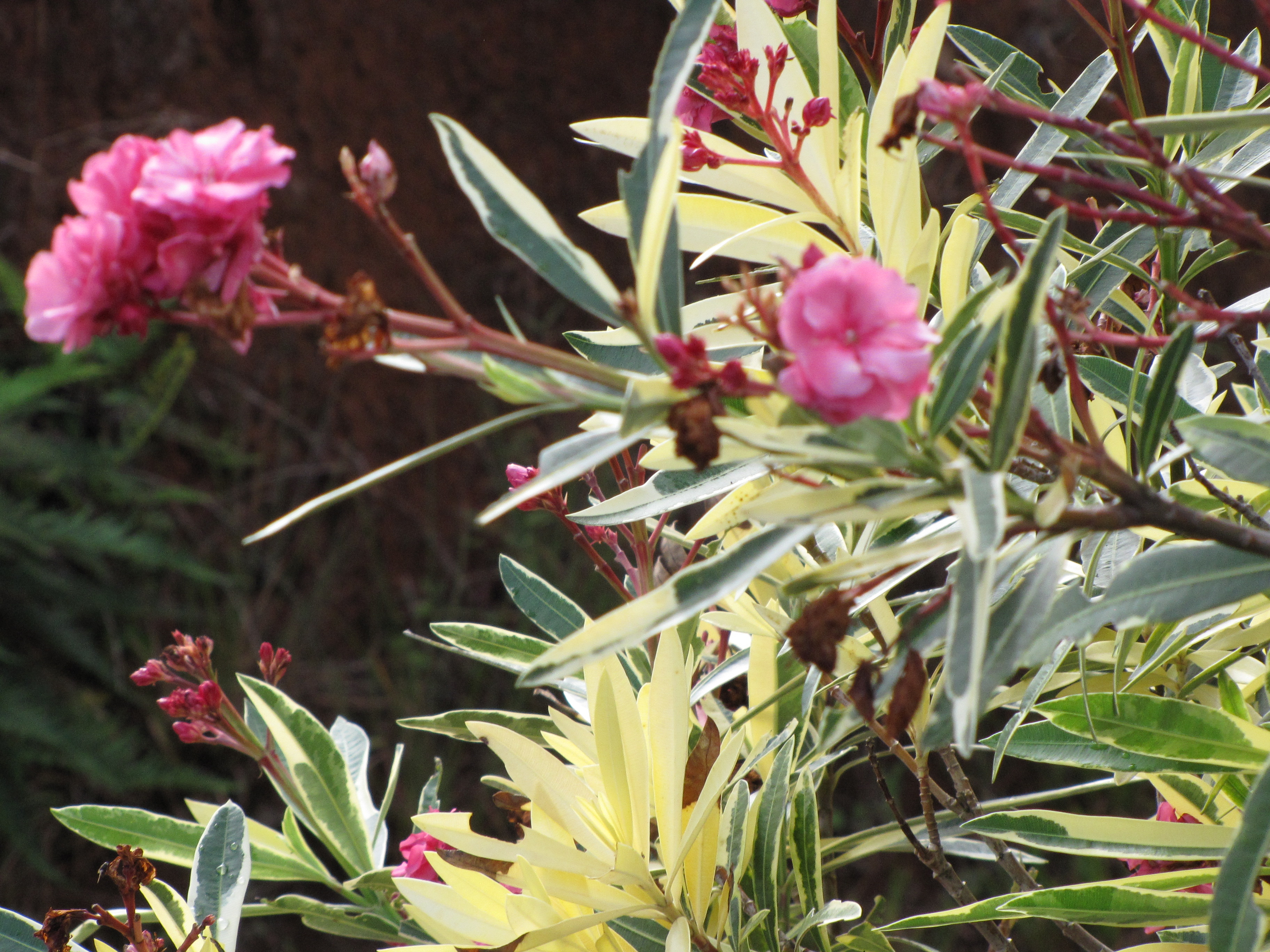
A variegated cultivar

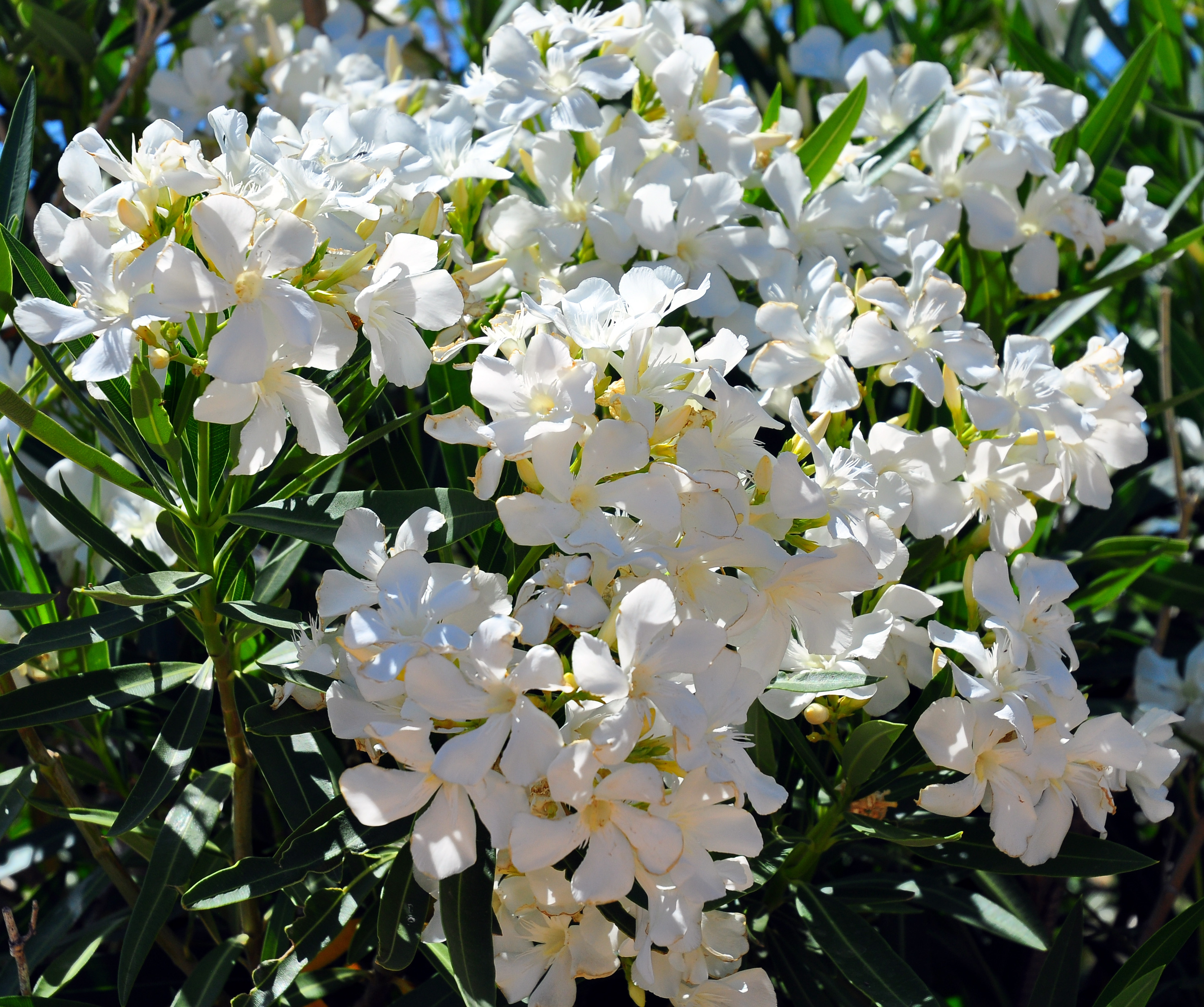
A white cultivar in bloom

Oleander is a vigorous grower in warm subtropical regions, where it is extensively used as an ornamental plant in parks, along roadsides and in private gardens. It is most commonly grown in its natural shrub form, but can be trained into a small tree with a single trunk. Hardy versions like white, red and pink oleander will tolerate occasional light frost down to −10 °C (14 °F), though the leaves may be damaged. The toxicity of oleander renders it deer-resistant and its large size makes for a good windbreak; as such it is frequently planted as a hedge along property lines and in agricultural settings.

The plant is tolerant of poor soils, intense heat, salt spray, and sustained drought – although it will flower and grow more vigorously with regular water. Although it does not require pruning to thrive and bloom, oleander can become unruly with age and older branches tend to become gangly, with new growth emerging from the base. For this reason gardeners are advised to prune mature shrubs in the autumn to shape and induce lush new growth and flowering for the following spring. Unless they wish to harvest the seeds, many gardeners choose to prune away the seedpods that form on spent flower clusters, which are a drain on energy. Propagation can be made from cuttings, where they can readily root after being placed in water or in rich organic potting material, like compost.

In Mediterranean climates oleanders can be expected to bloom from April through October, with the heaviest bloom usually occurring between May and June. Free-flowering cultivars like 'Petite Salmon' or 'Mont Blanc' require no period of rest and can flower continuously throughout the year if the weather remains warm.

In cold winter climates, oleander is a popular summer potted plant readily available at most nurseries. They require frequent heavy watering and fertilising as compared to being planted in the ground, but oleander is nonetheless an ideal flowering shrub for patios and other spaces with hot sunshine. During the winter they should be moved indoors, ideally into an unheated greenhouse or basement where they can be allowed to go dormant. Once they are dormant they require little light and only occasional watering. Placing them in a space with central heating and poor air flow can make them susceptible to a variety of pests, including aphids, mealy bugs, oleander scale, whitefly and spider mites.

==== Colours and cultivars ====
Oleander flowers are showy, profuse, and often fragrant, which makes them very attractive in many contexts. Over 400 cultivars have been named, with several additional flower colours not found in wild plants having been selected, including yellow, peach and salmon. Many cultivars, like 'Hawaii' or 'Turner's Carnival', are multi-coloured, with brilliant striped corollas. The solid whites, reds and a variety of pinks are the most common. Double flowered cultivars like 'Mrs. Isadore Dyer' (deep pink), 'Mathilde Ferrier' (yellow) or 'Mont Blanc' (white) are enjoyed for their large, rose-like blooms and strong fragrance. There is also a variegated form, 'Variegata', featuring leaves striped in yellow and white. Several dwarf cultivars have also been developed, offering a more compact form and size for small spaces. These include 'Little Red', 'Petite White', 'Petite Pink' and 'Petite Salmon', which grow to about 8 feet (2.4 m) at maturity.

== Toxicity ==
Oleandrin, one of the toxins present in oleander

Oleander is a poisonous plant—containing the toxic steroidal aglycone, cardenolide-type cardiac glycosides, odorosiside, adigoside, and oleandrin,—especially when consumed in large amounts. These compounds have a narrow therapeutic index and are toxic when ingested. Adverse effects after ingestion include weakness, diarrhoea, nausea, vomiting, headache, stomach pain, and death.

Toxicity studies of animals have concluded that birds and rodents are relatively insensitive to oleander cardiac glycosides. However, other mammals such as dogs and humans, are relatively sensitive to the effects of cardiac glycosides and they typically present clinical manifestations of "glycoside intoxication". It is also hazardous to animals such as sheep, horses, cattle, and other grazing animals, with as little as 100 g being enough to kill an adult horse. Clippings of the plant, because they are sweet, are especially dangerous to horses. In July 2009, several horses were poisoned in this manner from the leaves of the plant. Symptoms of a poisoned horse include severe diarrhoea and abnormal heartbeat. (This phenomenon is reflected in the plant's Sanskrit name aśvamāra (अश्वमार), a compound of aśva "horse" and māra "killing".)

In reviewing oleander toxicity cases seen in-hospital, Lanford and Boor concluded that, except for children who might be at greater risk, "the human mortality associated with oleander ingestion is generally very low, even in cases of moderate intentional consumption (suicide attempts)." In 2000, a rare instance of death from oleander poisoning occurred when two toddlers adopted from an orphanage ate the leaves from a neighbor's shrub in El Segundo, California. Because oleander is extremely bitter, officials speculated that the toddlers had developed a condition caused by malnutrition, pica, which causes people to eat otherwise inedible material.

=== Effects of poisoning ===
Ingestion of this plant can affect the gastrointestinal system, the heart, and the central nervous system. The main effect of cardiotoxic glycosides is positive inotropy. Glycosides bind to the sarcolemma transmembrane ATPase of cardiac muscle cells and compete with K^{+} ions, inactivating the enzyme. This results in an accumulation of Na^{+} and Ca^{2+} ions into the cardiac muscle cells, leading to stronger and faster heart contractions. Moreover, the increased amount of extracellular K^{+} ions may lead to lethal hyperkalemia. Therefore, clinical features of oleander poisoning are similar to digoxin toxicity and include nausea, diarrhoea, and vomiting due to stimulation of the area postrema of the medulla oblongata, neuropsychic disorders, and pathological motor manifestations. Cardiotoxic glycosides are also responsible for stimulating the vagus nerve (leading to sinus bradycardia) and the phrenic nerve (leading to hyperventilation), and lethal brady- and tachyarrhythmias, including asystole and ventricular fibrillation. Oleander poisoning can also result in blurred vision, and vision disturbances, including halos appearing around objects. Oleander sap can cause skin irritations, severe eye inflammation and irritation, and allergic reactions characterised by dermatitis.

The severity of the intoxication can vary based on the quantity ingested and an individual's physiological response, as well as the time of symptom onset after oleander ingestion: they can rapidly occur after drinking teas prepared with oleander leaves or roots or develop more slowly due to the ingestion of unprepared plant parts.

=== Treatment ===
Poisoning and reactions to oleander plants are evident quickly, requiring immediate medical care in suspected or known poisonings of both humans and animals. Induced vomiting and gastric lavage are protective measures to reduce absorption of the toxic compounds. Activated carbon may also be administered to help absorb any remaining toxins. Further medical attention may be required depending on the severity of the poisoning and symptoms. Temporary cardiac pacing will be required in many cases (usually for a few days) until the toxin is excreted.

Digoxin immune fab is the best way to cure an oleander poisoning if inducing vomiting has no or minimal success, although it is usually used only for life-threatening conditions due to side effects.

Drying of plant materials does not eliminate the toxins. There is a wide range of toxins and secondary compounds within oleander, and care should be taken around this plant due to its toxic nature. Different names for oleander are used around the world in different locations, so, when encountering a plant with this appearance, regardless of the name used for it, one should exercise great care and caution to avoid ingestion of any part of the plant, including its sap and dried leaves or twigs. The dried or fresh branches should not be used for spearing food, for preparing a cooking fire, or as a food skewer. Many of the oleander relatives, such as the desert rose (Adenium obesum) found in East Africa, have similar leaves and flowers and are equally toxic.

== Research ==
Drugs derived from N. oleander have been investigated as a treatment for cancer, but have failed to demonstrate clinical utility. According to the American Cancer Society, the trials conducted so far have produced no evidence of benefit, while they did cause adverse side effects.

== Culture ==
=== Oracle of Delphi ===
In a research study done by Haralampos V. Harissis, he claims that the laurel with which the Pythia is commonly depicted is actually an oleander plant, and the poisonous plant and its subsequent hallucinations are the source of the oracle's mystical power and subsequent prophecies. Many of the symptoms that primary sources such as Plutarch and Democritus report align with results of oleander poisoning. Harissis also provides evidence claiming that the word laurel may have been used to describe an oleander leaf.

=== Folklore ===
The toxicity of the plant makes it the centre of an urban legend documented on several continents and over more than a century. Often told as a true and local event, typically an entire family, or in other tellings a group of scouts, succumbs after consuming hot dogs or other food roasted over a campfire using oleander sticks. Some variants tell of this happening to Napoleon's or Alexander the Great's soldiers.

In Charleston, South Carolina, local folklore describes John and Lavinia Fisher as having poisoned the guests in their inn with oleander tea for the purpose of robbing them, though contemporaneous accounts do not corroborate the story.

There is an ancient account mentioned by Pliny the Elder in his Natural History, who described a region in Pontus in Turkey where the honey was poisoned from bees having pollinated poisonous flowers, with the honey left as a poisonous trap for an invading army. The flowers have sometimes been mis-translated as oleander, but oleander flowers are nectarless and therefore cannot transmit any toxins via nectar. The actual flower referenced by Pliny was either Azalea or Rhododendron, which is still used in Turkey to produce a hallucinogenic honey.

Oleander is the official flower of the city of Hiroshima, having been the first to bloom following the atomic bombing of the city in 1945.

=== In painting ===
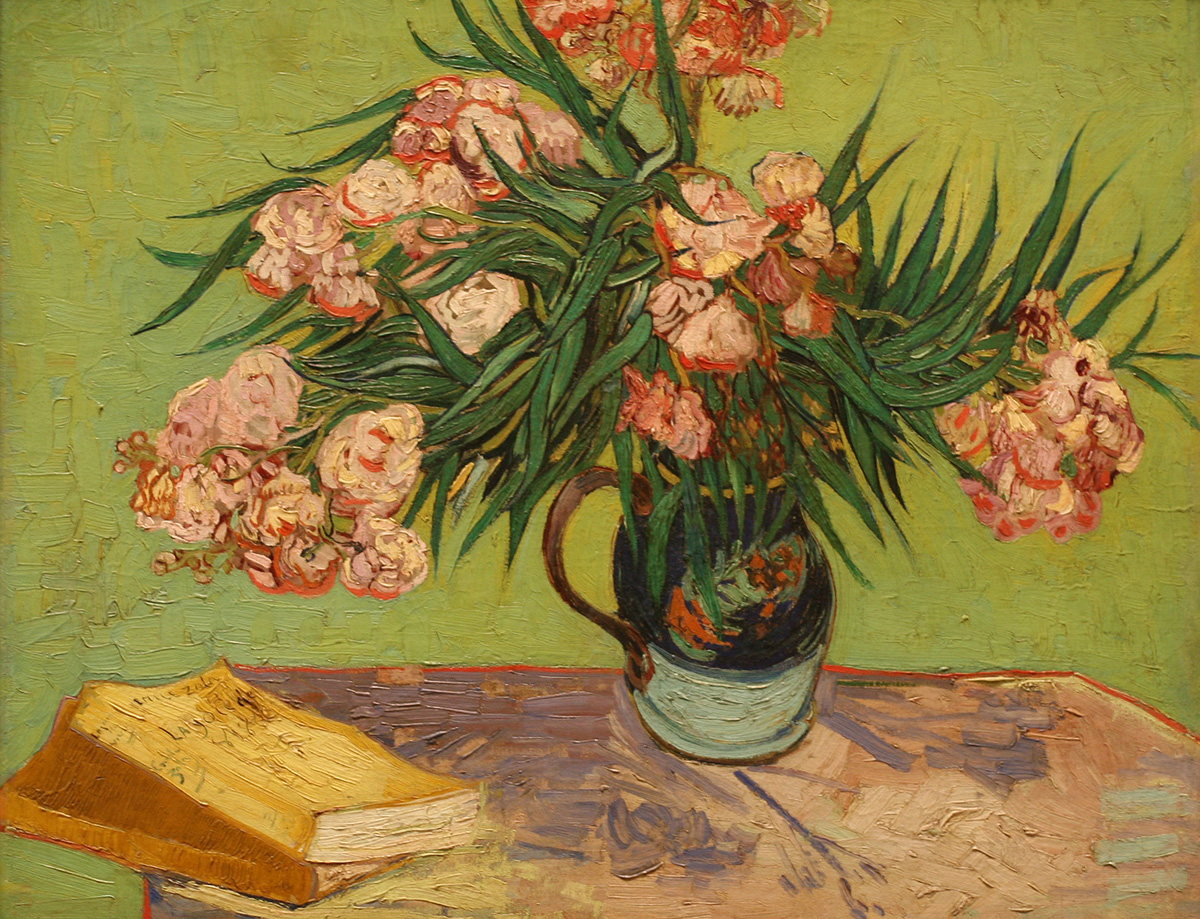
Oleanders by Vincent van Gogh

Oleander was part of subject matter of paintings by famous artists including:

- Gustav Klimt, who painted Two Girls with an Oleander between 1890 and 1892.
- Vincent van Gogh painted his famous Oleanders in Arles in 1888. Van Gogh found the flowers "joyous" and "life-affirming" because of their inexhaustible blooms and vigour.
- Anglo-Dutch artist Sir Lawrence Alma-Tadema incorporated oleanders into his classically inspired paintings, including An Oleander (1882), Courtship, Under the Roof of Blue Ionian Weather and A Roman Flower Market (1868).
- The Terrace at Méric (Oleanders), an 1867 Impressionist painting by Frédéric Bazille.

=== In literature, film and music ===
- In the 17th century AD Farsi-language book the Jahangirnama, the Mughal emperor Jahangir passes a stream overgrowing with oleanders along its banks. He orders the nobles in his train to adorn their turbans with oleander blossoms, creating a "field of flowers" on their heads.
- Steely Dan's 1973 song "My Old School" contains the line "Oleanders growing outside her door, soon they're gonna be in bloom up in Annandale" in the second verse. It has been suggested that this reference is either a metaphor for a harmful relationship, or marijuana, which is the subcontext of the song.
- Janet Fitch's 1999 novel White Oleander is based around a young Southern California girl's experiences growing up in foster care after her mother is imprisoned for poisoning an ex-boyfriend with the plant. The book was adapted into a 2002 film of the same name starring Michelle Pfeiffer and Alison Lohman.

== Gallery ==
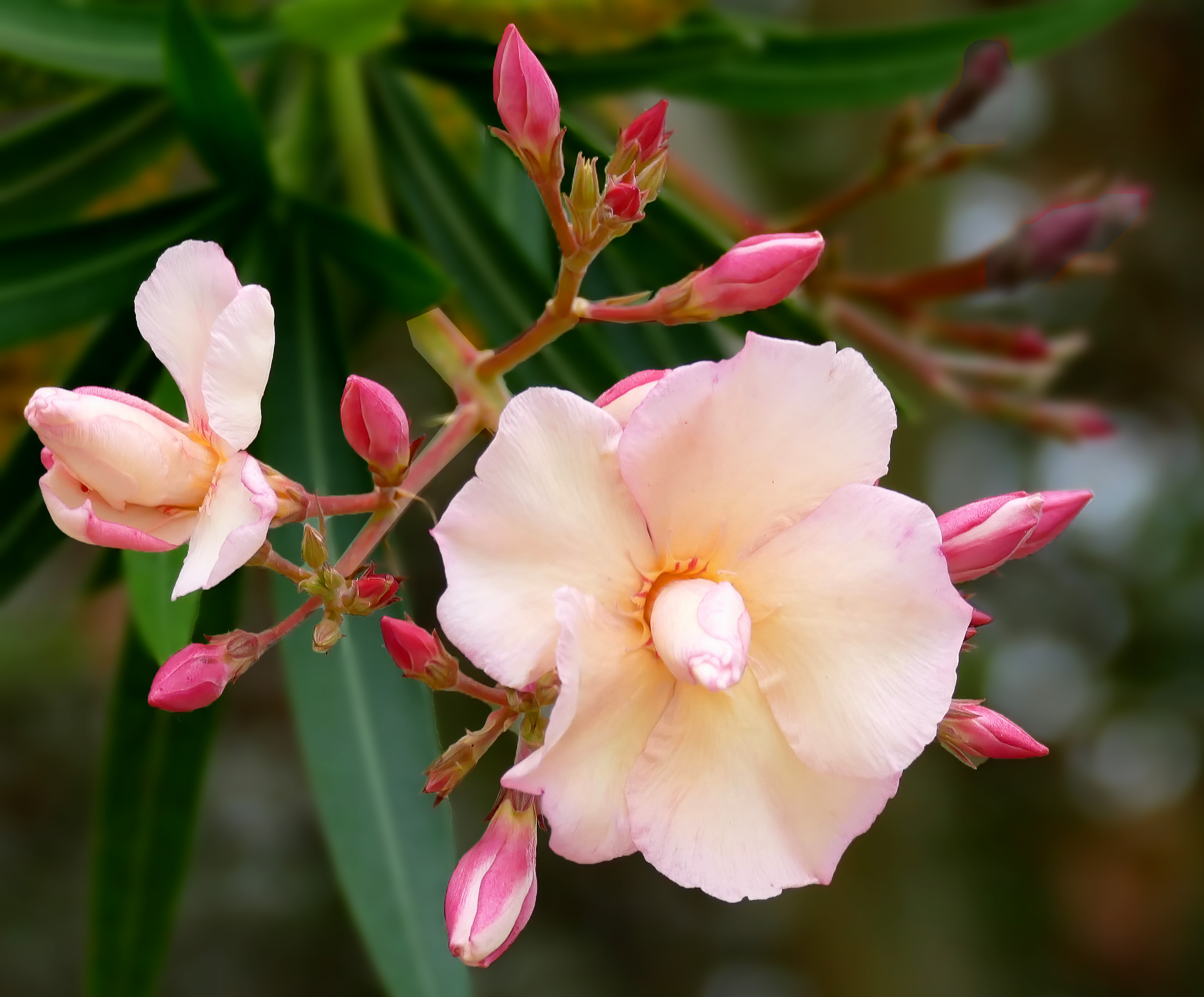

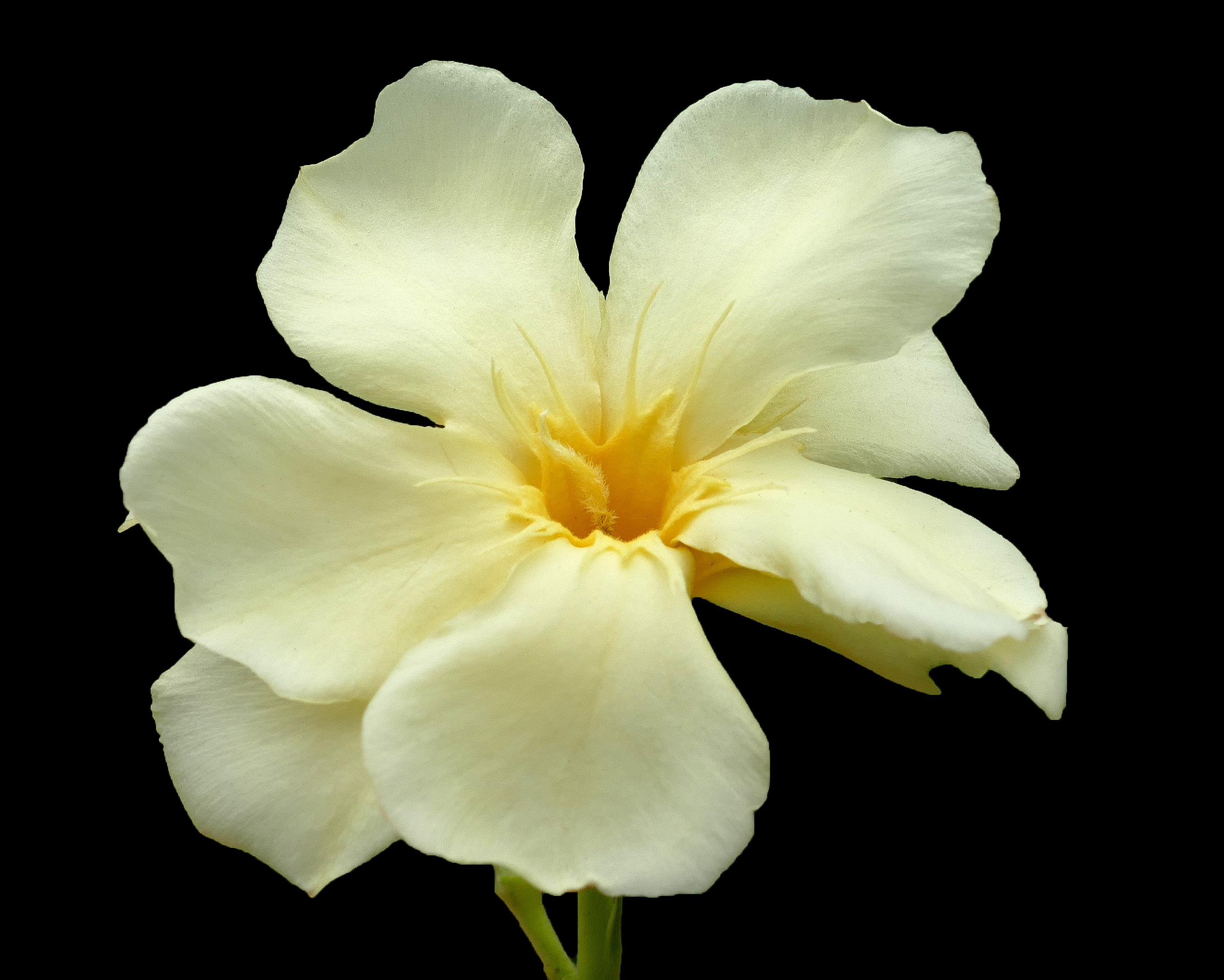
An unusual yellow-flowered cultivar. Cultivated in Galveston, Texas

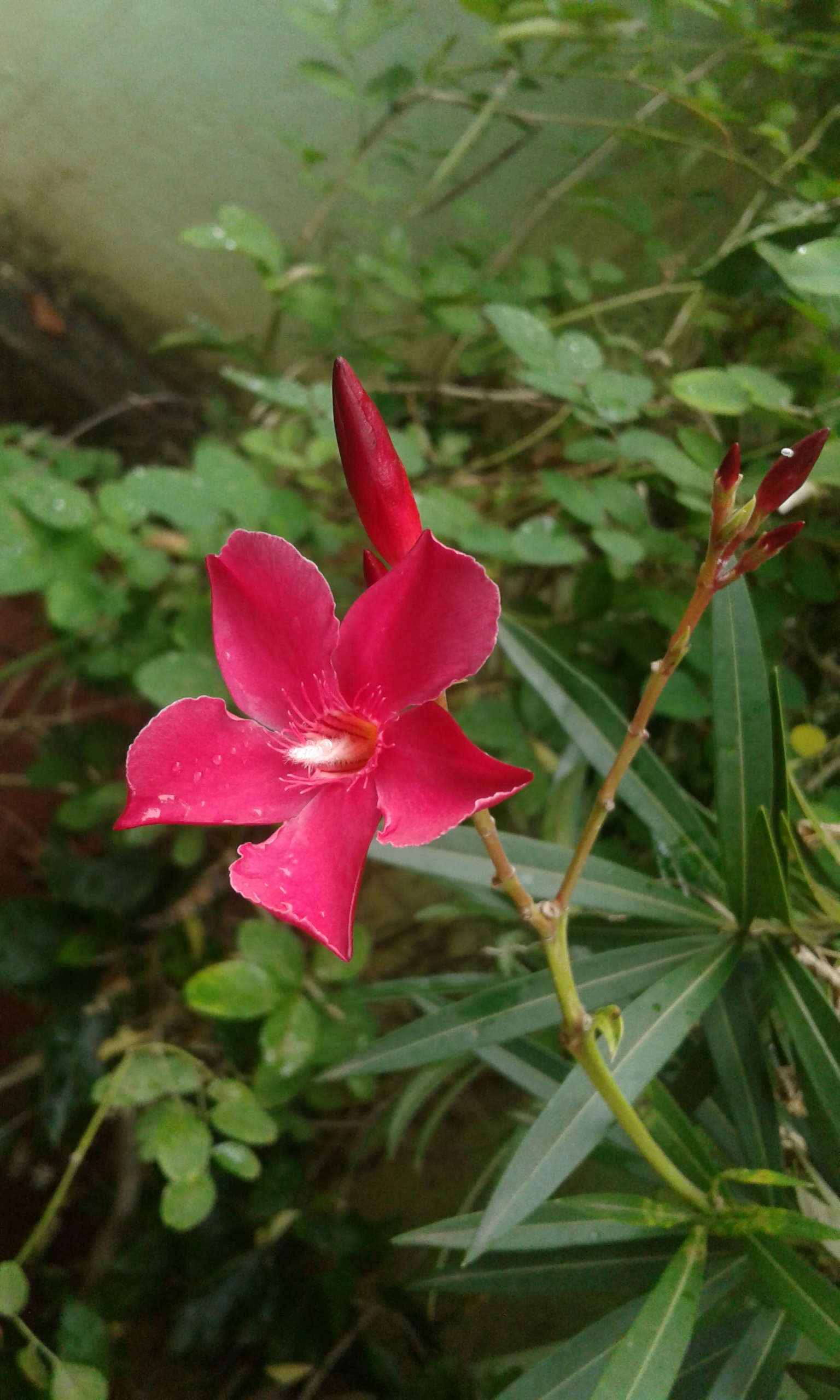

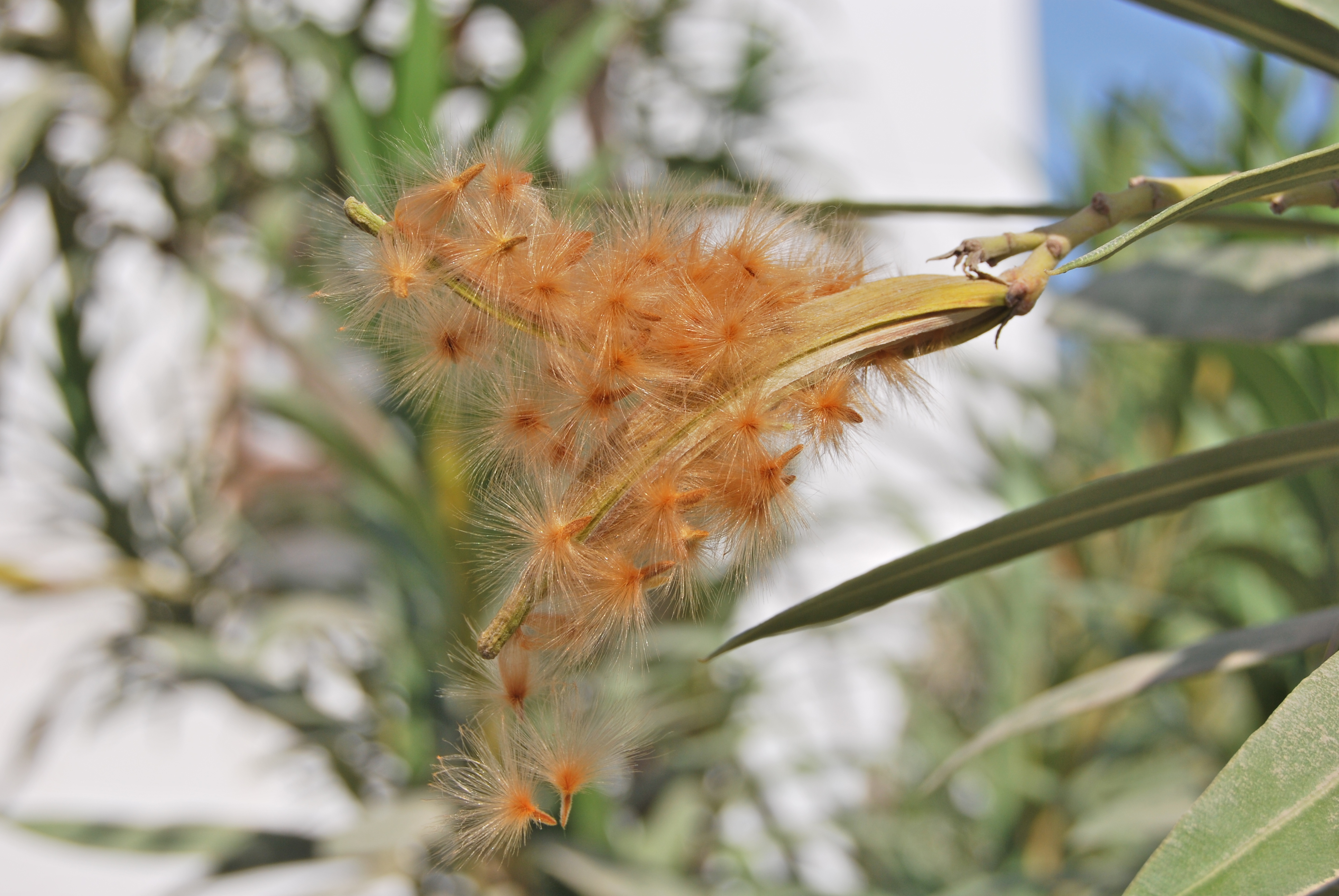
Follicle spreading seeds

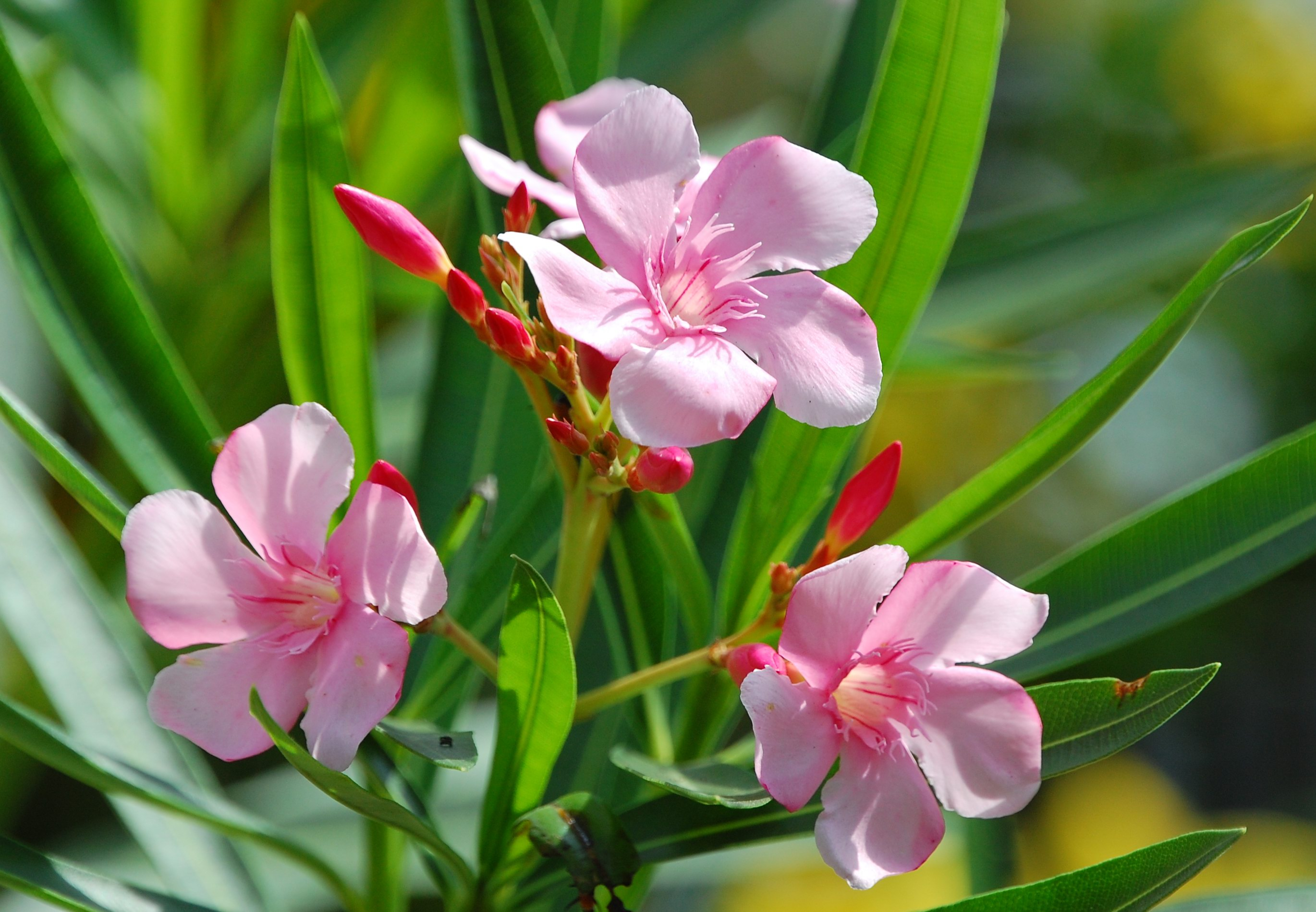

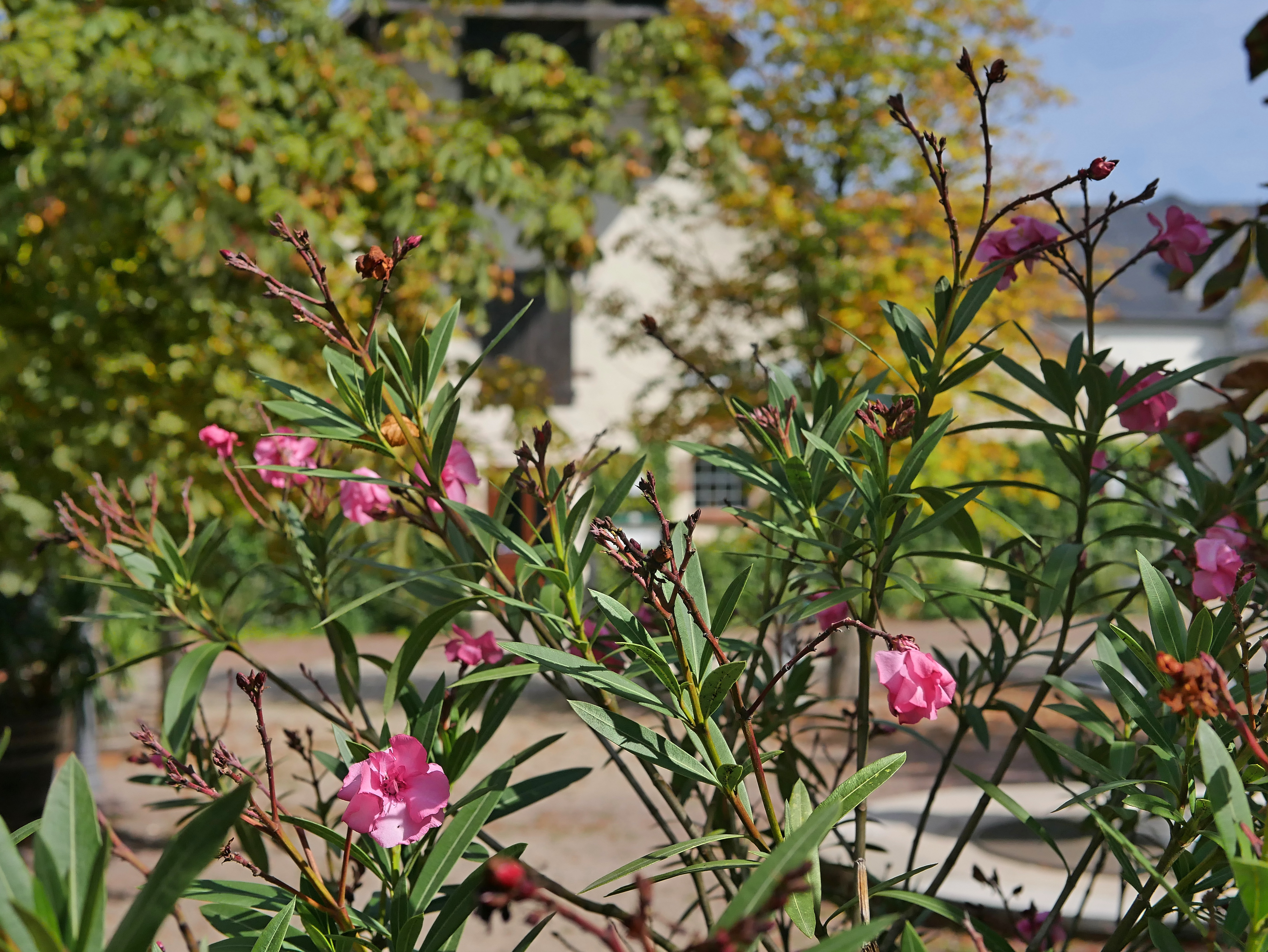

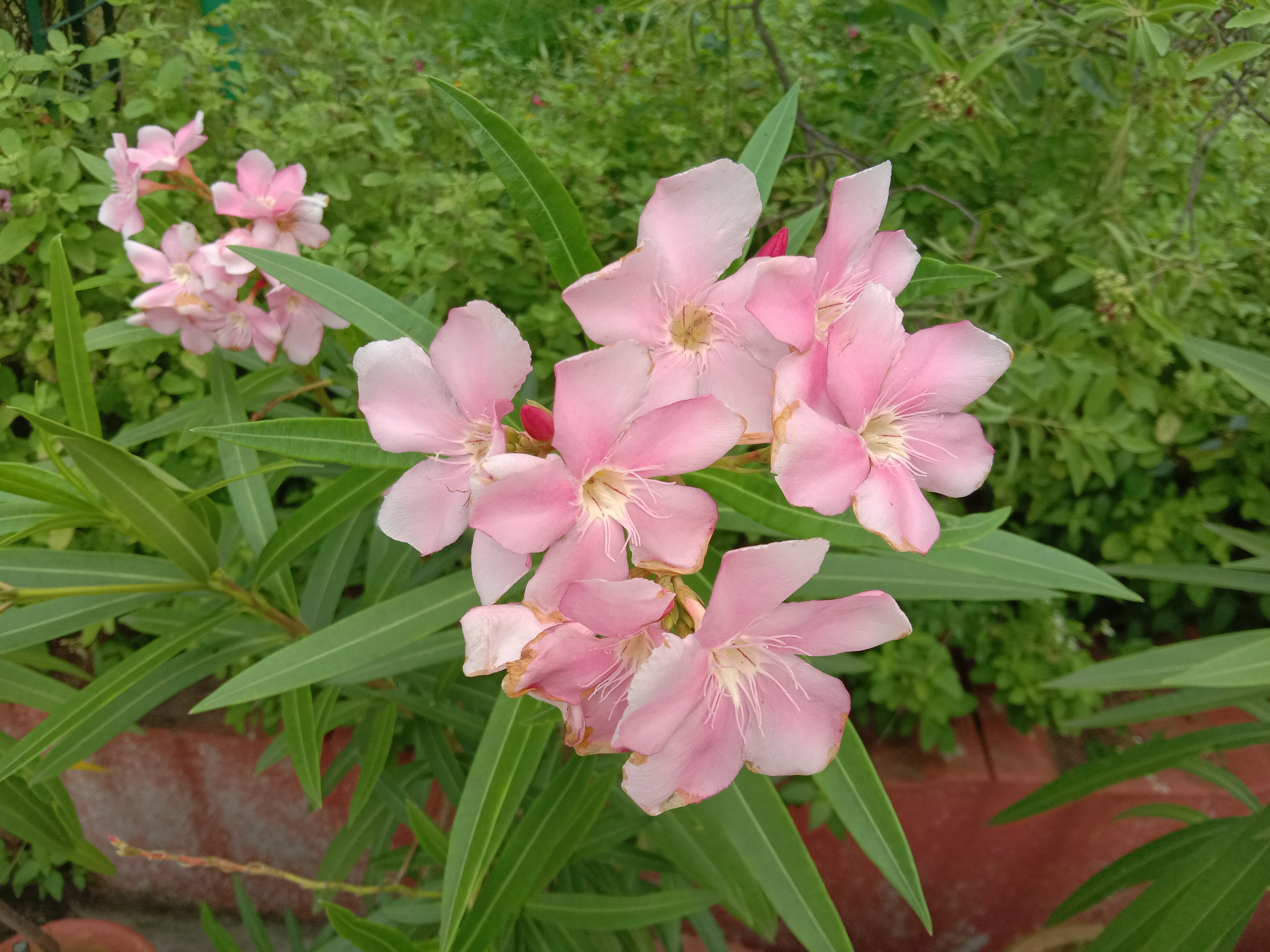
N. oleander in West Bengal

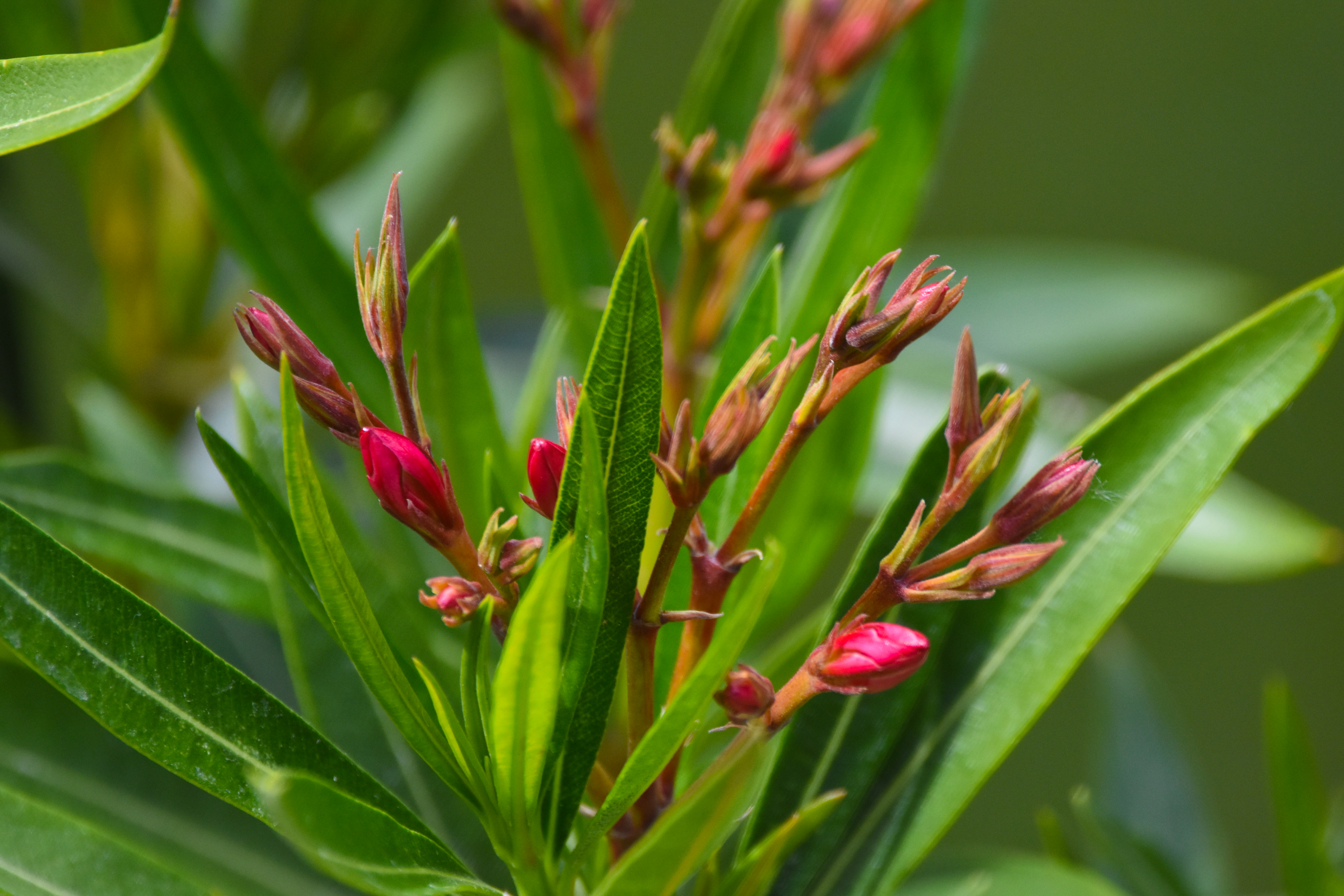
Closed buds of an oleander shrub near Yalta, Ukraine

== See also ==
- Cascabela thevetia (yellow oleander)
- List of ineffective cancer treatments
- List of plants poisonous to equines
- List of poisonous plants
- Tibesti-Jebel Uweinat montane xeric woodlands
