= Alafia multiflora =

Scientific classification
- Kingdom: Plantae
- Clade: Tracheophytes
- Clade: Angiosperms
- Clade: Eudicots
- Clade: Asterids
- Order: Gentianales
- Family: Apocynaceae
- Genus: Alafia
- Species: A. multiflora

Binomial name
- Alafia multiflora (Stapf) Stapf

Synonyms
- Alafia malouetioides K.Schum; Holalafia multiflora Stapf

Species of plant

Alafia multiflora is a plant in the family Apocynaceae.

== Description ==
Alafia multiflora grows as a liana up to 40 metres (130 ft) long, with a stem diameter of up to 18 centimetres (7 in). Its fragrant flowers feature a white corolla, often green outside.

== Distribution and habitat ==
Alafia multiflora is native to an area of Africa from Liberia east to the Democratic Republic of the Congo and north to Egypt. Its habitat is riverine forest, from sea level to 750 metres (2,500 ft) altitude.

== Uses ==
Local medicinal uses of Alafia multiflora include as a treatment for wounds, ulcers and abdominal pains. The plant has been used as arrow poison.
