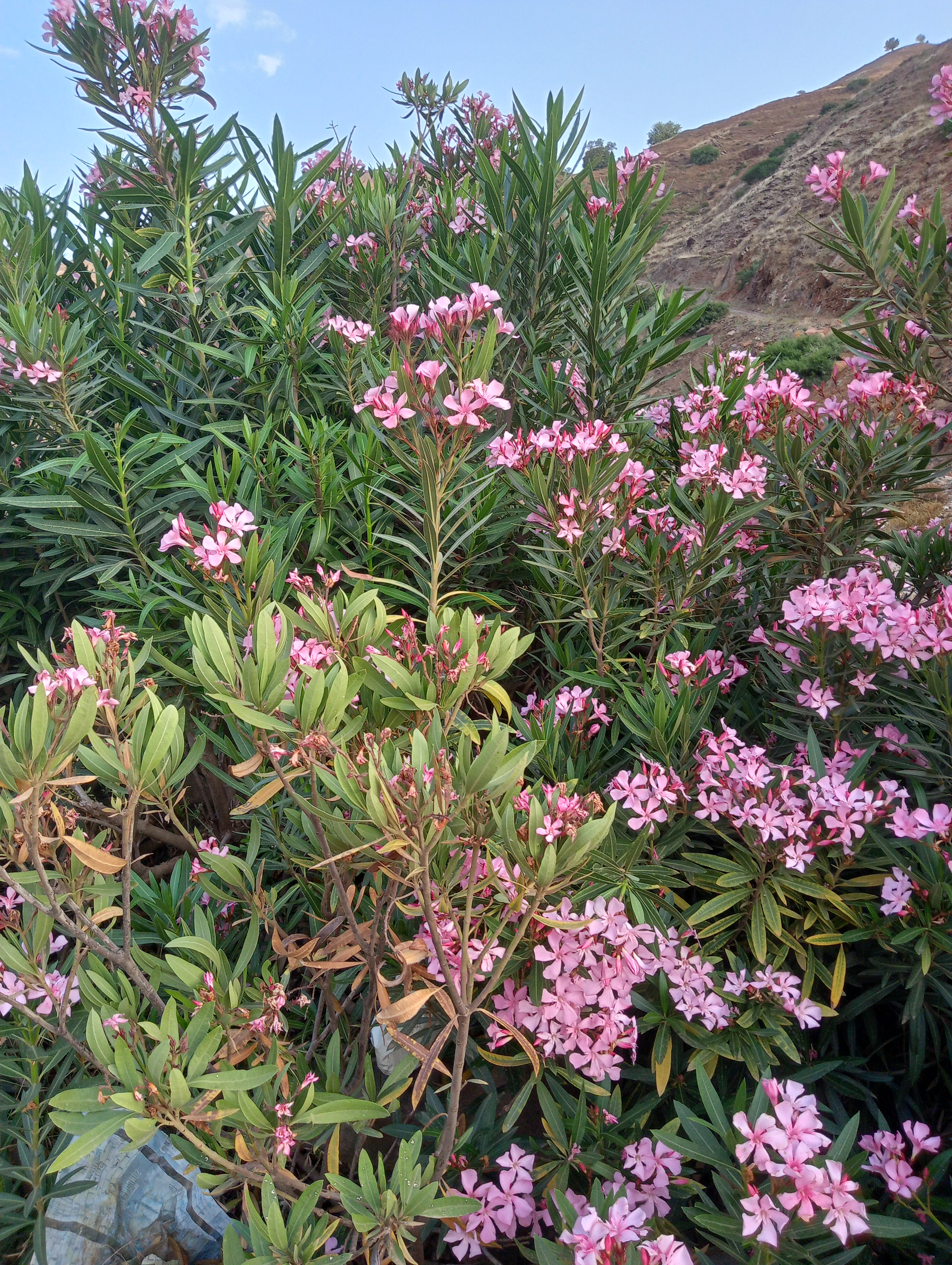
- Nerium oleander

Scientific classification
- Kingdom: Plantae
- Clade: Embryophytes
- Clade: Tracheophytes
- Clade: Angiosperms
- Clade: Eudicots
- Clade: Asterids
- Order: Gentianales
- Family: Apocynaceae
- Subfamily: Apocynoideae
- Tribe: Nerieae; Baill.

= Nerieae =

Tribe of flowering plants

Nerieae is a tribe of flowering plants under subfamily Apocynoideae. It includes genera such as Adenium and Nerium. Its species are cultivated all around the world.

== Genera ==
- Adenium
- Alafia
- Farquharia
- Isonema
- Nerium
- Strophanthus

== Bibliography ==
- Endress, Mary E.; Liede-Schumann, Sigrid; Meve, Ulrich (2014). "An updated classification for Apocynaceae". Phytotaxa. 159 (3): 175–194. Bibcode:2014Phytx.159..175E. doi:10.11646/phytotaxa.159.3.2. ISSN 1179-3163.
- Baillon, Henri Ernest (1889). "Histoire des Plantes" (in French). 10: 166, 198.
- Leeuwenberg, Anthonius Josephus Maria (1988). "The Nerieae (Apocynaceae-Apocynoideae). Monographs in Systematic Botany from the Missouri Botanical Garden (PDF)". 25: 157-160.
