= Alafia lucida =

Scientific classification
- Kingdom: Plantae
- Clade: Tracheophytes
- Clade: Angiosperms
- Clade: Eudicots
- Clade: Asterids
- Order: Gentianales
- Family: Apocynaceae
- Genus: Alafia
- Species: A. lucida

Binomial name
- Alafia lucida Stapf

Synonyms
- Alafia cuneata Stapf; Alafia major Stapf; Alafia reticulata K.Schum; Wrightia stuhlmannii K.Schum

Species of plant

Alafia lucida is a plant in the family Apocynaceae.

== Description ==
Alafia lucida grows as a liana up to 45 metres (150 ft) long, with a stem diameter of up to 18 centimetres (7 in). Its fragrant flowers feature a yellow or cream corolla, dark red at the throat. The fruit is dark brown with paired cylindrical follicles, each up to 75 centimetres (30 in) in diameter.

== Distribution and habitat ==
Alafia lucida is native to an area of tropical Africa from Liberia east to Tanzania. Its habitat is forests, from sea level to 2,000 metres (6,600 ft) altitude.

== Uses ==
Local traditional medicinal uses of Alafia lucida include as a treatment for jaundice, eye problems and stomach complaints. The plant has been used as arrow poison.
