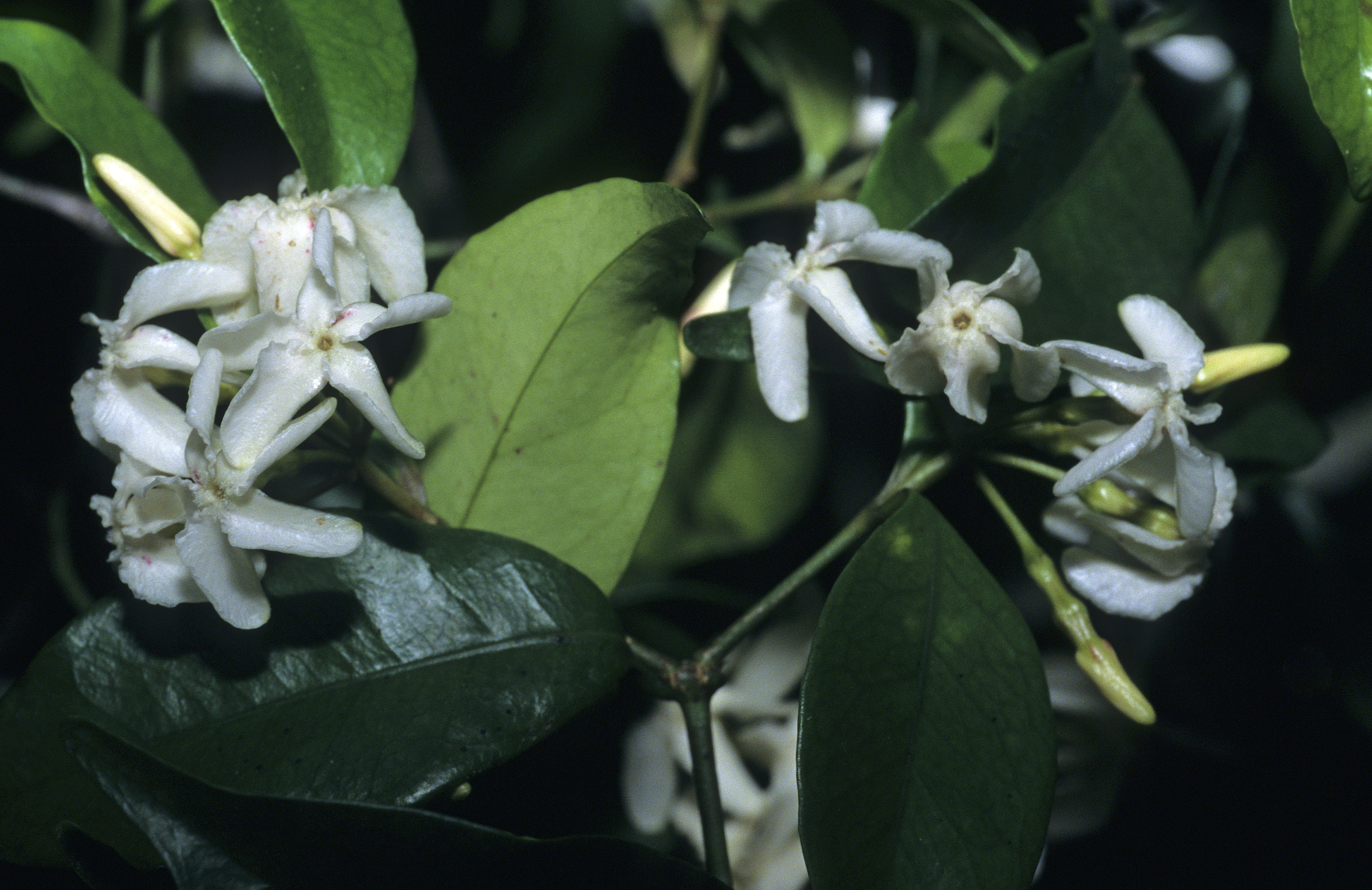

Scientific classification
- Kingdom: Plantae
- Clade: Tracheophytes
- Clade: Angiosperms
- Clade: Eudicots
- Clade: Asterids
- Order: Gentianales
- Family: Apocynaceae
- Genus: Alafia
- Species: A. caudata

Binomial name
- Alafia caudata Stapf

Synonyms
- Alafia butayei Stapf; Alafia conica Pichon; Alafia jarmentosa Stapf; Alafia sarmentosa Stapf

= Alafia caudata =

Species of plant

Alafia caudata is a plant in the family Apocynaceae.

== Description ==
Alafia caudata grows as a climbing shrub or liana. Its fragrant flowers feature a white or yellowish corolla. The fruit is grey with paired follicles, each up to 36 centimetres (14 in) long.

== Distribution and habitat ==
Alafia caudata is native to an area of tropical Africa from Cameroon to Mozambique. Its habitat is mixed forest.
