= Alafia landolphioides =

Scientific classification
- Kingdom: Plantae
- Clade: Embryophytes
- Clade: Tracheophytes
- Clade: Spermatophytes
- Clade: Angiosperms
- Clade: Eudicots
- Clade: Asterids
- Order: Gentianales
- Family: Apocynaceae
- Genus: Alafia
- Species: A. landolphioides

Binomial name
- Alafia landolphioides (A.DC.) K.Schum

Synonyms
- Alafia scandens (Thonn.) De Wild.; Blastrophe scandens (Thonn.) Didr.; Holarrhena landolphioides A.DC.; Randia gambica Hiern

Species of plant

Alafia landolphioides is a plant in the family Apocynaceae. It grows as a liana up to 20 m (70 ft) long, with a stem diameter of up to 2.5 cm (1 in). Its fragrant flowers feature a white corolla, dark red at the throat. The fruit is dark brown with paired cylindrical follicles, each up to 45 cm (18 in) in diameter.

Its habitat is forest and savanna, from sea level to 1,000 m (3,300 ft) altitude. Local medicinal uses include as a treatment for rheumatism. The plant has been used as arrow poison. Alafia landolphioides grows natively in countries from Senegal in the west through West Africa to the Democratic Republic of the Congo.
