= Alafia zambesiaca =

Scientific classification
- Kingdom: Plantae
- Clade: Tracheophytes
- Clade: Angiosperms
- Clade: Eudicots
- Clade: Asterids
- Order: Gentianales
- Family: Apocynaceae
- Genus: Alafia
- Species: A. zambesiaca

Binomial name
- Alafia zambesiaca Kupicha

Species of plant

Alafia zambesiaca is a plant in the family Apocynaceae.

== Description ==
Alafia zambesiaca grows as a climbing shrub or liana. Its fragrant flowers feature a creamy-white or yellowish corolla. The fruit is dark grey with paired follicles, each up to 30 centimetres (12 in) long.

== Distribution and habitat ==
Alafia zambesiaca is native to the Democratic Republic of the Congo, Tanzania, Zambia and Zimbabwe. Its habitat is savanna woodland.
