= Alafia orientalis =

Scientific classification
- Kingdom: Plantae
- Clade: Tracheophytes
- Clade: Angiosperms
- Clade: Eudicots
- Clade: Asterids
- Order: Gentianales
- Family: Apocynaceae
- Genus: Alafia
- Species: A. orientalis

Binomial name
- Alafia orientalis K.Schum ex De Wild.

Synonyms
- Alafia congolana Pichon; Alafia ugandensis Pichon

Species of plant

Alafia orientalis is a plant in the family Apocynaceae.

== Description ==
Alafia orientalis grows as a liana. Its flowers feature a white corolla, sometimes reddish on the outside. The fruit is grey with paired follicles, each up to 70 centimetres (28 in) long.

== Distribution and habitat ==
Alafia orientalis is native to the Democratic Republic of the Congo, Uganda, Tanzania, Mozambique and Zimbabwe. Its habitat is dense forest.
