= Alafia barteri =

Scientific classification
- Kingdom: Plantae
- Clade: Tracheophytes
- Clade: Angiosperms
- Clade: Eudicots
- Clade: Asterids
- Order: Gentianales
- Family: Apocynaceae
- Genus: Alafia
- Species: A. barteri

Binomial name
- Alafia barteri Oliv.

Synonyms
- Alafia giraudii Dubard; Alafia glabriflora Pichon; Alafia klaineana Pierre ex Pichon

Species of plant

Alafia barteri is a plant in the family Apocynaceae.

== Description ==
Alafia barteri grows as a liana up to 35 metres (115 ft) long, with a stem diameter of up to 3 centimetres (1.2 in). Its fragrant flowers feature a white corolla. The fruit is dark brown with paired cylindrical follicles, each up to 50 centimetres (20 in) in diameter. Local traditional medicinal uses include as a treatment for malaria and rheumatism.

== Distribution and habitat ==
Alafia barteri is native to an area of tropical Africa from Sierra Leone to Gabon. Its habitat is lowland forest from sea level to 200 metres (700 ft) altitude.
