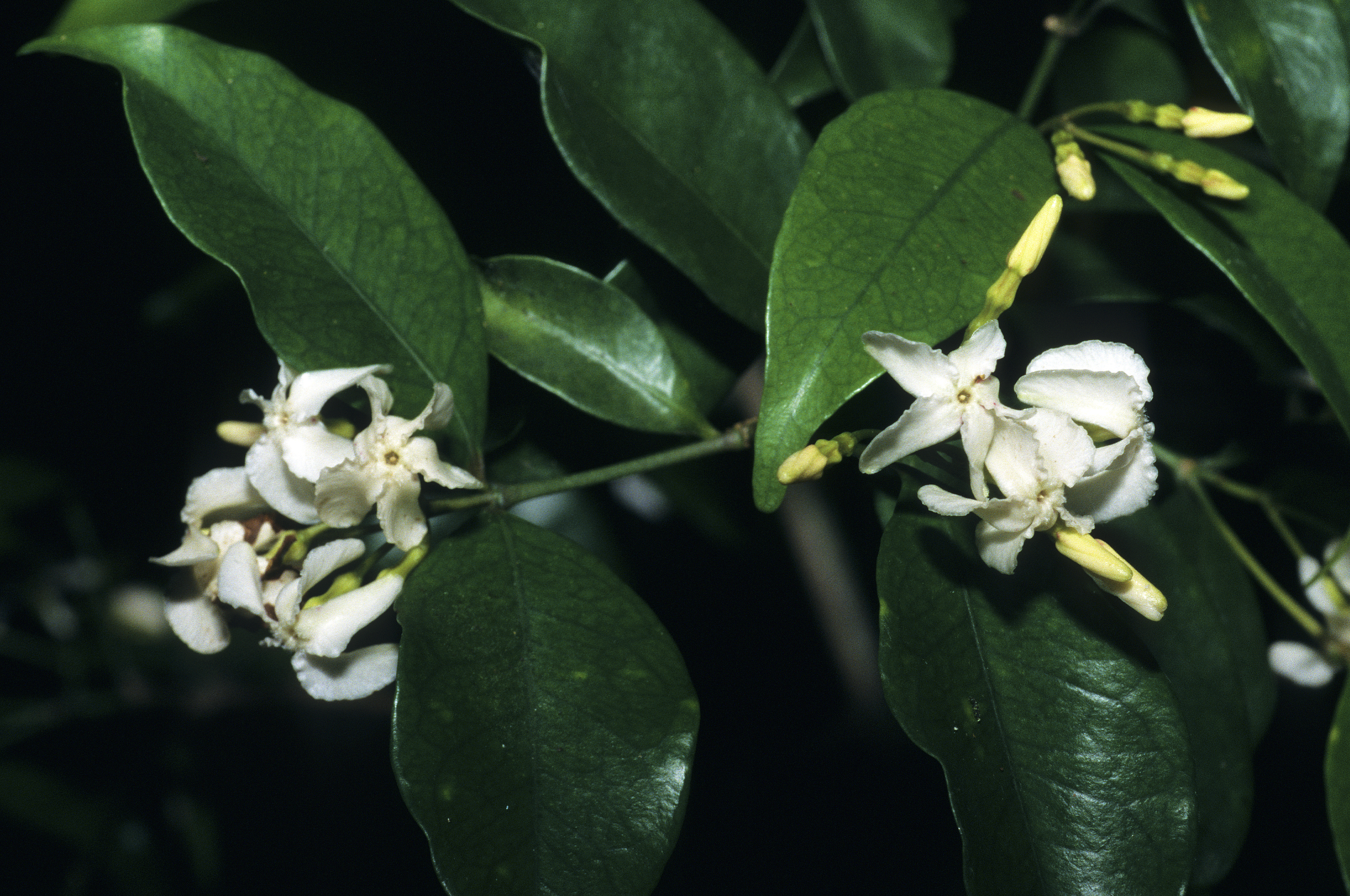
- Alafia caudata subsp. latiloba

Scientific classification
- Kingdom: Plantae
- Clade: Embryophytes
- Clade: Tracheophytes
- Clade: Spermatophytes
- Clade: Angiosperms
- Clade: Eudicots
- Clade: Asterids
- Order: Gentianales
- Family: Apocynaceae
- Subfamily: Apocynoideae
- Tribe: Nerieae
- Genus: Alafia; Thouars

Synonyms
- Blastrophe Didr.; Ectinocladus Benth.; Holalafia Stapf; Vilbouchevitchia A.Chev.

= Alafia (plant) =

Genus of plants

Alafia is a genus of lianas or climbing shrubs found in tropical Africa and Madagascar.

As of June 2026, Plants of the World Online accepts these species:

- Alafia alba Pichon
- Alafia barteri Oliv.
- Alafia benthamii (Baill.) Stapf
- Alafia berrieri Jum.
- Alafia calophylla Pichon
- Alafia caudata Stapf
- Alafia erythrophthalma (K.Schum) Leeuwenb.
- Alafia falcata Leeuwenb.
- Alafia fuscata Pichon
- Alafia insularis Pichon
- Alafia intermedia Pichon
- Alafia landolphioides (A.DC.) K.Schum
- Alafia lucida Stapf
- Alafia microstylis K.Schum
- Alafia multiflora (Stapf) Stapf
- Alafia nigrescens Pichon
- Alafia orientalis K.Schum ex De Wild.
- Alafia parciflora Stapf
- Alafia pauciflora Radlk.
- Alafia perrieri Jum.
- Alafia schumannii Stapf
- Alafia thouarsii Roem. & Schult.
- Alafia vallium Pichon
- Alafia whytei Stapf
- Alafia zambesiaca Kupicha
