= Farquharia =

Scientific classification
- Kingdom: Plantae
- Clade: Tracheophytes
- Clade: Angiosperms
- Clade: Eudicots
- Clade: Asterids
- Order: Gentianales
- Family: Apocynaceae
- Subfamily: Apocynoideae
- Tribe: Nerieae
- Genus: Farquharia; Stapf
- Species: F. elliptica

Binomial name
- Farquharia elliptica Stapf

Synonyms
- Aladenia Pichon; Alafia jasminiflora A.Chev. ex Hutch. & Dalziel; Alafia mirabilis A.Chev. ex Hutch. & Dalziel; Holalafia jasminiflora Hutch. & Dalziel; Alafia velutina Leeuwenb.

Genus of plants

Farquharia is a genus of flowering plants in the family Apocynaceae, first described as a genus in 1912. It contains only one recognized species, Farquharia elliptica, native to tropical western and central Africa (Ghana, Ivory Coast, Nigeria, Cameroon, Gabon, Republic of Congo and Democratic Republic of the Congo).

Formerly included

- Farquharia excelsa (Bojer) Hils. & Bojer. = Crateva excelsa Bojer
