= Isonema =

Scientific classification
- Kingdom: Plantae
- Clade: Embryophytes
- Clade: Tracheophytes
- Clade: Spermatophytes
- Clade: Angiosperms
- Clade: Eudicots
- Clade: Asterids
- Order: Gentianales
- Family: Apocynaceae
- Subfamily: Apocynoideae
- Tribe: Nerieae
- Genus: Isonema; R.Br., 1810

Species
- See text

Genus of plants (fossil)

Isonema is a genus of plant in the family Apocynaceae first described as a genus in 1810. It is native to Africa.

Species

- Isonema buchholzii Engl. - Nigeria, Cameroon
- Isonema infundibuliflorum Stapf - Cameroon, Gabon, Zaire
- Isonema smeathmannii Roem. & Schult. - W Africa (Ghana, Guinea, Guinea-Bissau, Ivory Coast, Liberia, Senegal, Sierra Leone)
