= Laura M. Robinson =

Canadian actress, author, game designer, and television producer

Laura Robinson
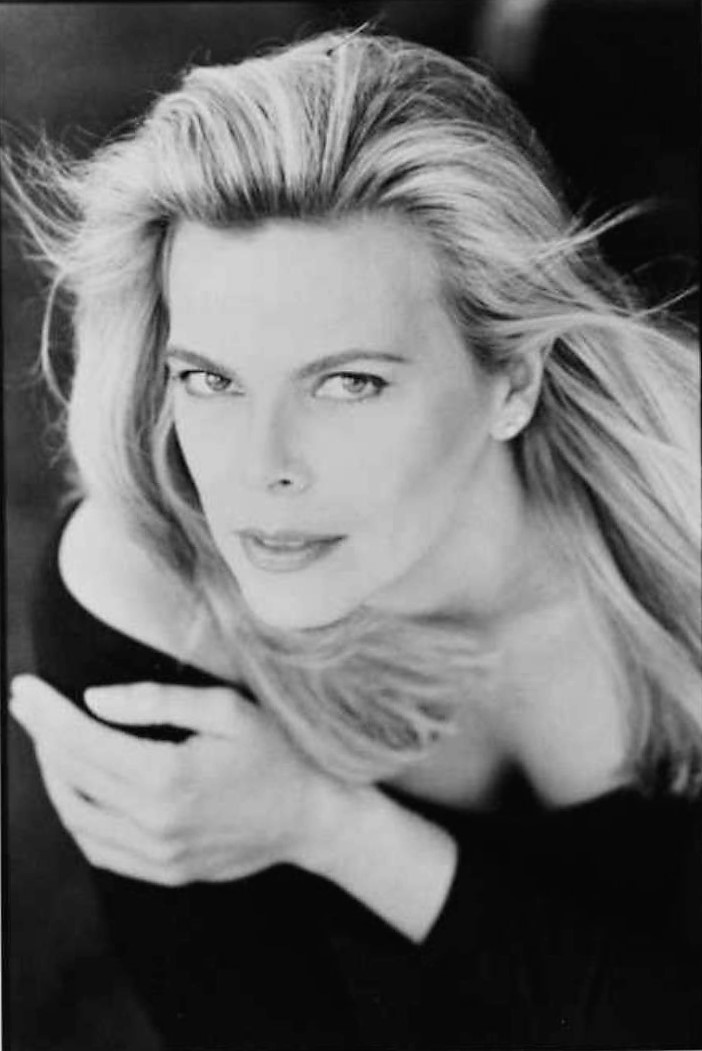
- Robinson, circa 1987
- Born: Laura McKinlay Robinson; 1957 or 1958 (age 67–68); Kingston, Ontario, Canada
- Other name: McKinlay Robinson
- Education: London South Collegiate Institute; University of Windsor (BFA, 1980)
- Occupations: Actress, author, game designer, television producer
- Years active: 1984–present
- Known for: Balderdash; Night Heat; Veronica Clare; Celebrity Name Game
- Spouse: Mark Ettlinger
- Children: 2
- Website: www.laurarobinson.com

Laura McKinlay Robinson (born 1957/1958) is a Canadian actress, author, game designer, and television producer. She co-invented multiple board games, beginning with Balderdash (1984), which has sold millions of copies internationally and was the basis for a television game show (2004–2005).

As an actress, she had a major recurring role on the television series Night Heat (1985–1988), played the villainess in The Spirit (1987), and starred in the television series Veronica Clare (1991), among other roles on stage, movies, and television. She co-produced the television game show Celebrity Name Game (2014–2017), which was nominated for a Daytime Emmy Award for Outstanding Game Show. It was based on Identity Crisis, another board game she co-invented. As a writer, she co-wrote or contributed stories to the Chicken Soup for the Soul series books Count Your Blessings (2009), O Canada (2011), Hooked on Hockey (2012), and Miraculous Messages from Heaven (2013).

== Early life ==
Laura McKinlay Robinson was born on 7 May, in 1957 or 1958 in Kingston, Ontario, and raised in London, Ontario, in a performing family. Her mother was Margaret Muriel Robinson, née Mars, from Brantford, Ontario, who wrote plays for amateur theatre. Her father, Kenneth Ian Robinson, was a sales manager for Hiram Walker and Sons, and played tenor saxophone, leading Toronto area jazz bands including the Sax Family Robinson and the Ian Robinson Trio. Her brother Chris Robinson also plays the tenor saxophone professionally. Laura Robinson started singing with her father's jazz band at the age of 15.

Robinson graduated London South Collegiate Institute high school in 1975, where she studied theatre with Marion Woodman, whom she credits with inspiring her acting career. She went on to the University of Windsor where she earned a Bachelor of Fine Arts in Dramatic arts. Her early work was as an actress in television commercials, and weekend weather presenter for London, Ontario CFPL-DT television.

== Balderdash ==
Robinson created the board game Balderdash with advertising copywriter Paul Toyne, her boyfriend at the time, in 1984. It is a board game version of the parlor game Dictionary, where players compete to guess the correct definition of a word from among false ones. Robinson and Toyne played the parlor game the first time they met, at Toyne's family cottage, and they started work on the board game within a month. The five television commercials that Robinson had running supported the pair while they developed the game over the first eight months, most of which they spent in libraries to research the 2,500 words that made it into the first edition. One night they were locked in the University of Toronto library after missing closing time. Her mother Margaret came up with the board game name, which means "nonsense".

Balderdash launched among a series of successful 1980s Canadian board games: Trivial Pursuit in 1982, Scruples in 1984, and Pictionary in 1985. A friend's successful investment in Trivial Pursuit spurred the couple on. They sold the first 5000 copies in Ontario toy stores before expanding throughout Canada with the Canadian Toy Fair in early 1985. The following year, Balderdash became the top-selling game in Canada, dethroning Trivial Pursuit. The couple made between $1 and $2 for each copy sold.

By 1987, Robinson and Toyne split up romantically, but they remained business partners. By the following year, over a million copies of the game had been sold in Canada, with another million expected to sell in the United States that year. In 1990, Balderdash's Swedish translation, Rappakalja, won the Årets Spel award for Best Family Game from the Swedish game manufacturers' association.

By 1997, Balderdash was sold in Australia, Canada, Europe, the United Kingdom, and the United States, with over 5 million copies sold worldwide. By 2006, it had sold over 10 million copies in 17 countries.

== Acting ==
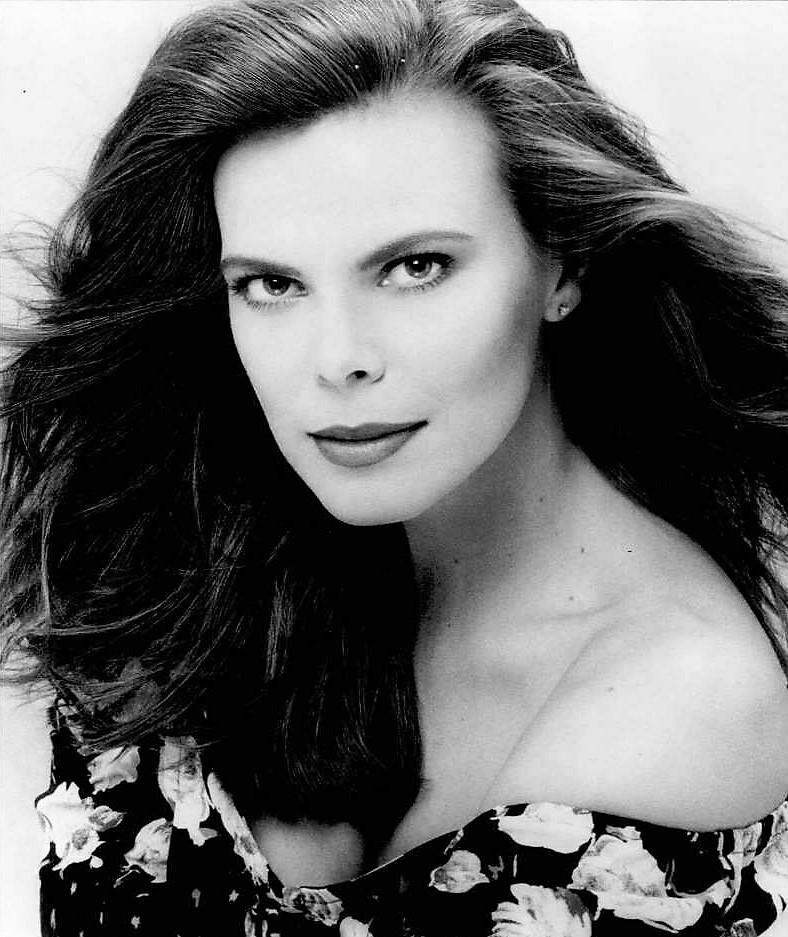
Robinson as a brunette, to play P'Gell in The Spirit, 1987

Robinson’s first major acting role was Detective Christine Meadows, a rare female homicide detective, on Night Heat. She appeared in three seasons of the American television series, which was filmed in Toronto, from 1985 to 1988. Playing Balderdash was among the TV cast and crew's favorite pastimes between takes.

In 1986, Robinson, credited as McKinlay Robinson, her middle name, joined the American Broadcasting Company (ABC) television network Talent Development Program, auditioning in New York City, then moving to Los Angeles. She used this name for a 1987 role as P'Gell Roxton, the main villain in The Spirit, a television film based on the comics character that was meant to be the beginning of a series that never materialized. She was under contract to ABC for four years. By 1991, Robinson's earnings from acting matched those from Balderdash royalties.

In 1991, Robinson (back to Laura Robinson) starred in the title role on the Lifetime network series Veronica Clare. Inspired by 1940s Hollywood film noir, the series stars Robinson as the owner of a jazz club who moonlights as a private investigator. Robinson credited her experience playing femmes fatale and her smoky voice with winning her the role over several hundred other actresses. Reviewers commented on Robinson's sultry voice, wavy hair, and sex appeal, with one comparing her to Jessica Rabbit as voiced by Kathleen Turner in Who Framed Roger Rabbit, but criticized her acting. The show lasted nine episodes.

=== Roles ===
Laura M. Robinson film and television acting credits
Year	Title	Role	Notes
1984	Thrillkill	Adrian (accomplice)	Theatrical film. Credited as Laura Robinson.
1985-88	Night Heat	Detective Christine Meadows	Recurring role. Credited as Laura McKinlay Robinson.
1987	The Pink Chiquitas	Trudy Jones (newscaster)	Theatrical film. Credited as McKinlay Robinson.
1987	The Spirit	P'Gell (main villain)	Television film (pilot). Intended series based on the comics character. Credited as McKinlay Robinson.
1987	Goofballs	Sarah Mae	Theatrical film. Credited as Laura Robinson, from here onwards.
1988	Emerald City	Helen Davey	Play
1988	Switching Channels	Karen Ludlow (reporter)	Theatrical film.
1989	Friday the 13th: The Series	Tabitha Robbins (main villain)	Episode: "Face of Evil"
1989	Cheers	Nurse	Episode: "The Stork Brings a Crane"
1989	Hardball	Anareeve	Episode: "Which Witch Is Which?"
1990	Counterstrike	Andrea	Episode: "Cry of the Children" (S1.E15)
1991	The Flash	Col. Powers (villain)	Episode: "Alpha"
1991	Veronica Clare	Veronica Clare	Main character
1992	Mikey	Grace Kelvin	Theatrical film.
1992	Forever Knight	Tawny Teller (reality TV host)	Episode: "Unreality TV"
1996	Frasier	Lynette	Episode: "High Crane Drifter"
1998	CHiPs '99	Hayley (mechanic)	Television film
2005	The Perfect Man	Saleslady	Theatrical film
2006	Missing	Unknown	Episode "Double Take"
2015	Portal to Hell!!!	Jeanie (tenant)	Short horror film.

== Television production and other game design ==
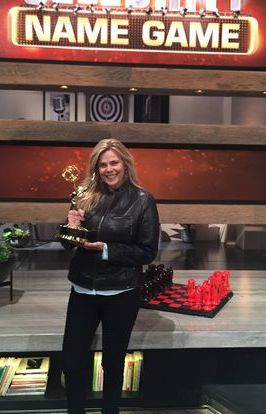
Robinson holding Ferguson's Daytime Emmy Award for Celebrity Name Game, circa 2016

Robinson and Toyne considered making Balderdash into a television game show as early as 1986. From 1997, she and her husband, Mark Ettlinger, were actively working on translating it into a television game show. The show, also called Balderdash, aired in 2004 on PAX TV, hosted by Elayne Boosler.

While in California to pursue her acting career, Robinson met Rachel Nelson and Elizabeth Bryan, who were both newly divorced and working on books about divorce. The three created a board game, initially called Embracing Divorce, which involved collecting charms representing items like love, hope and giving, that went on a "count your blessings" charm bracelet. The three marketed the resulting "Count Your Blessings" jewelry on QVC cable television, but the board game took longer. In 2009, the makers of the Chicken Soup for the Soul books agreed to publish the revised game, now called Count Your Blessings, in conjunction with the book Chicken Soup for the Soul: Count Your Blessings, which Robinson and Bryan contributed to writing.

In 2006, after returning to Canada from Los Angeles, Robinson created the game Identity Crisis (stylized as !dentity Crisis?) with graphic designer Patrick Lightheart and Richard Gerrits, her talent agent. It is also based on a parlor game, where teammates try to guess the name of a celebrity based on a limited number of clues.

Robinson and Gerrits served as producers on Identity Crisis's American television game show adaptation, Celebrity Name Game, alongside showrunner Scott St. John. The series was developed by Coquette Productions and executive producers Courteney Cox and David Arquette. The show involved contestants paired with celebrities trying to answer questions about pop culture. Cox and Arquette played the board game often, and proposed the show to CBS in 2011. The show's host, Craig Ferguson, hosted the late night talk show The Late Late Show with Craig Ferguson on the same network. It ended up premiering in broadcast syndication in September 2014, distributed by Debmar-Mercury and FremantleMedia. Ferguson quit his position on The Late Late Show two months after he started hosting the game show. Making a complete circle from board game to game show and back, Celebrity Name Game also became a board game released by PlayMonster in 2016. Celebrity Name Game ran for three seasons, ending in 2017, and won Ferguson two consecutive Daytime Emmy Awards as best game show host in 2015 and 2016. In 2017, both the show and Ferguson were nominated for Daytime Emmy Awards. An Australian version of Celebrity Name Game, hosted by Grant Denyer, aired from 2019 to 2020.

Katie Kildahl, an assistant on Celebrity Name Game, had invented a ribald dice game about penis size that the show's production crew played. Robinson and Gerrits joined her to submit the game to PlayMonster, which published it as Size Matters in 2017.

== Writing ==
In 2009, Robinson and Bryan co-wrote the collection of short inspirational stories Chicken Soup for the Soul: Count Your Blessings with five author/collators, in conjunction with their board game. Robinson also contributed a foreword, and a personal story about returning to Canada from Los Angeles.

She continued to write for the Chicken Soup for the Soul series. She contributed a similar story about her return to Canada to Chicken Soup for the Soul: O Canada in 2011, was listed as the only author, besides the series founders, of Chicken Soup for the Soul: Hooked on Hockey in 2012, and contributed the lead story to Chicken Soup for the Soul: Miraculous Messages from Heaven in 2013. Robinson, her husband, and her son each contributed a short story to Chicken Soup for the Soul: Hooked on Hockey.

== Events ==
In 2011, Robinson was a speaker at the fifth annual Inspiring Women event in Kitchener, Ontario. In 2014, Robinson was the host of the Chicago Toy & Game Fair game-inspired fashion show.

== Personal life ==
After the success of Balderdash, Robinson moved from Toronto to Hollywood in the late 1980s to pursue her acting career. There, she met actor Mark Ettlinger—the son of Don Ettlinger, a New York-based writer for film, television and theater. They married and had two children before moving back to Canada in mid-2003, to give them the kind of childhood that Robinson had in Canada, and to be with Robinson's father before his death. Their son Jack Ettlinger is also an actor and singer, who competed in Canada's Got Talent in 2012. Robinson's father died in 2008 and her mother in 2012.
