= Balderdash (disambiguation) =

Balderdash is a board game.

Balderdash may also refer to:

- Balderdash (game show), a television show based on the game
- "Balderdash", a 2007 single by Ipso Facto (band)
- Balderdash, nickname of Adam Balding, an English rugby union footballer

== See also ==
- Ganser syndrome, also called balderdash syndrome, a rare mental disorder
- Balderdash and Piffle, a radio show regarding English words
- Boulder Dash (disambiguation)
