= Adams & Co. (Boston) =

Publishing firm in Boston, Massachusetts

Adams & Co. (c.1860s-1880s) was a publishing firm in Boston, Massachusetts, in the mid-19th century. It specialized in spiritualist authors such as Hudson Tuttle and parlour games such as "Oliver Twist." John S. Adams ran the business, along with George L. Stafford. It operated from offices on Bromfield Street (c.1867-1873), Pearl Street (c.1875) and Tremont Street (c.1880).

== Images ==
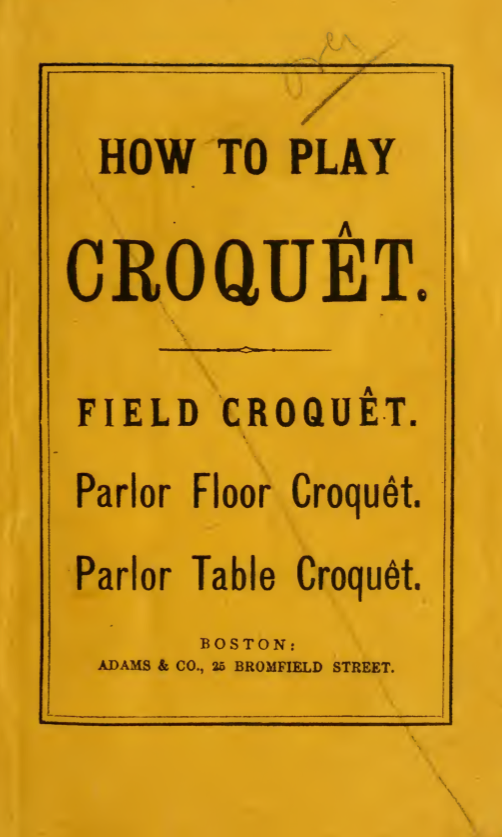
How to Play Croquet, 1865

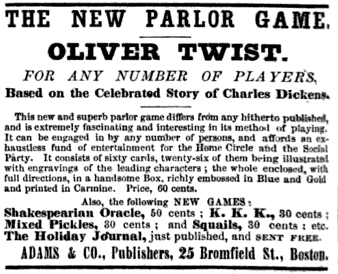
1867 advertisement for "Oliver Twist" game of Charles Dickens characters

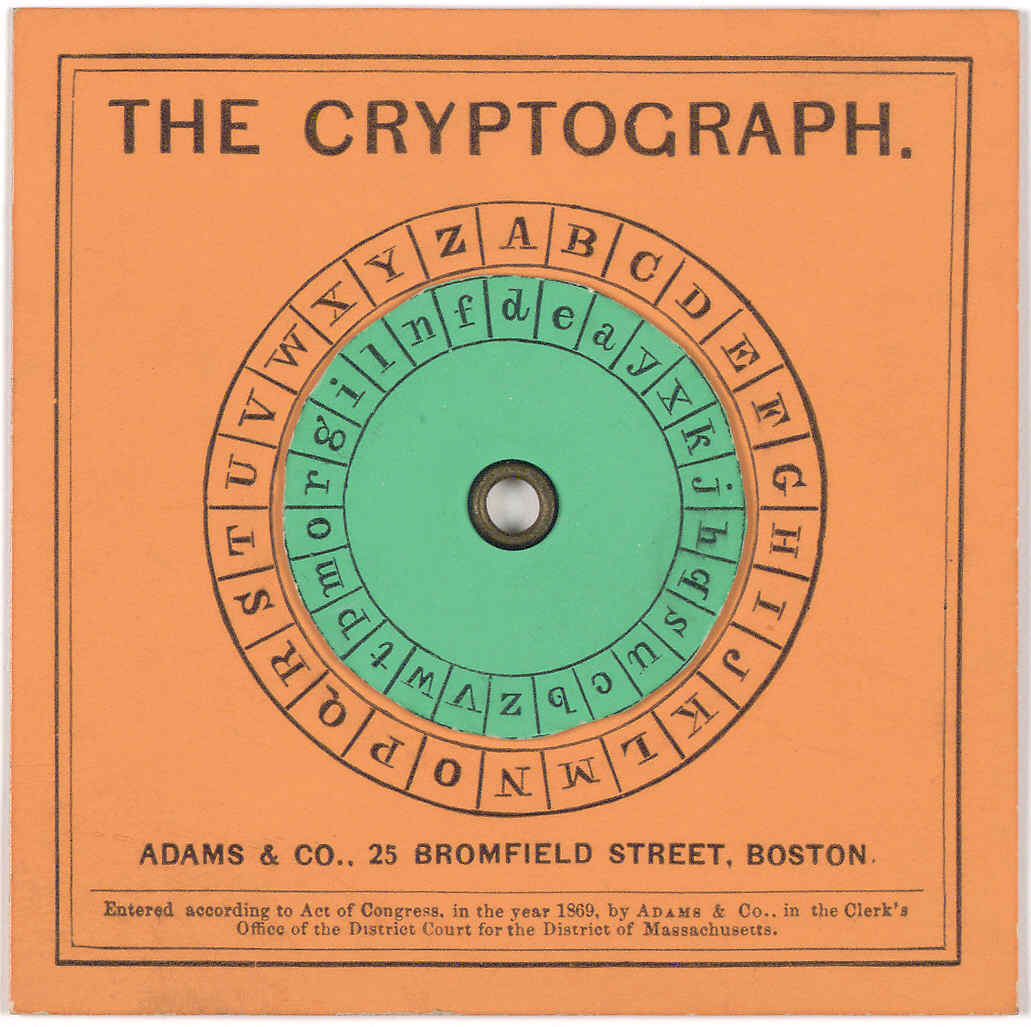
"Cryptograph," 1869 (Library of Congress)

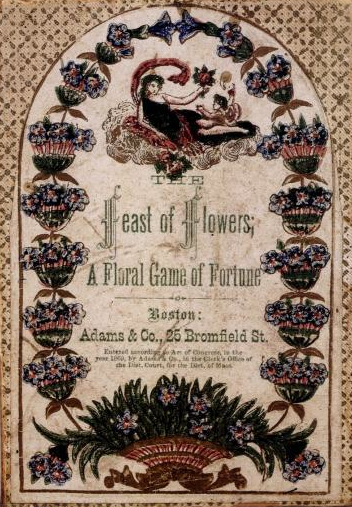
"Feast of Flowers, a Floral Game of Fortune," 1869 (New York Historical Society)

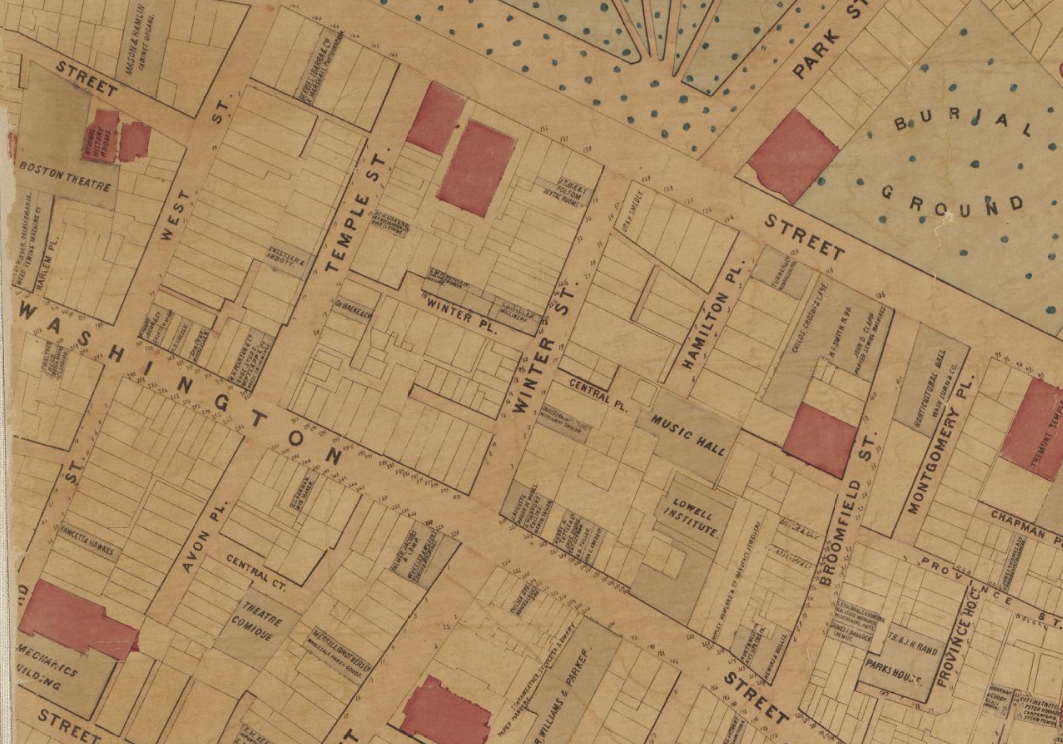
Detail of map of Boston showing Bromfield St. and vicinity, 1860s (Boston Public Library)

== Games and novelties ==
Some of the "games and novelties" issued and/or sold by the firm:

- Budget of Wonders
- The Chopped-Up Monkey
- The Conjuror's Puzzle
- The Cryptograph
- The Electric Cannon
- The Electric Cottage, "... by an explosion without powder or fire this cottage is thrown high in air, the experiment being perfectly safe."
- Eskemo
- The Feast of Flowers, "a floral game of fortune"
- Forced Confessions
- Fun Alive
- Go–Bang, a Japanese Verandah Game; Stay–Bang and Slam–Bang
- The Great Egg-Trick, "as performed by Moulabux, of the Asiatic Troupe at the Crystal Palace, London"
- Humorous Authors
- Invisible Ink
- The Invisible Money-Box
- Invisible Photographs
- Japanese Curiosos
- Japanese Egg
- Japanese Snapping Pictures
- Komikal Konversation Kards
- Labyrinthian Puzzles
- The Love Chase
- The Magi Divination Cards
- The Magic Bottle
- Magic Picture Cards
- The Magic Wonder Telescope
- The Magician's Own Cards
- Match and Catch
- Mixed Pickles
- The Moslem Oracle
- The Most Laughable Thing on Earth
- Mystic Scrolls
- Oliver Twist
- Parlor Ring-Toss
- The Pigeon-Tail Puzzle
- Pocket Conjuring Box
- Popping the Question
- Puzzle Porridge
- Santa Claus Magical Christmas Box
- The Shakesperian Oracle
- The Seven Racers
- The Spiral Puzzle
- The Squirming Fish
- Three Merry Men
- Tom Thumb's Comical Fortune Teller
- Trade and Dicker
- Tumble-Down Dick
- Which is the Largest?
- The Wizard's Pack of Playing Cards
- Zarofiel

== Published by Adams & Co. ==
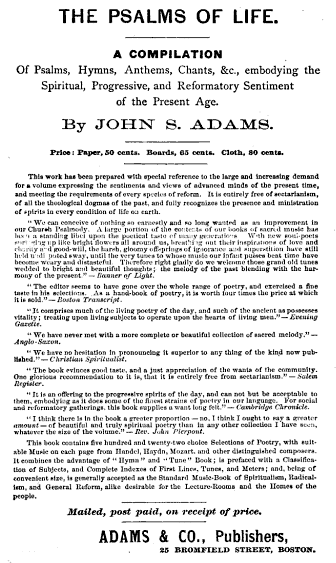
1871 advertisement for Psalms of Life by John Stowell Adams (1823-1893), published by Adams & Co.

- How to play croquêt. The Company. 1865.
- Thayer (1865). A Youth's History of the Rebellion: from the capture of Roanoke Island to the Battle of Murfreesboro.
- Harriet A. Adams (1866), Branches of Palm, OCLC 13081230, OL 17512856M
- T.E.A. (1866), Waterfalls and Frizzes (song)
- L.H. Gurney (1866), Love Never Sleeps: a new and beautiful song with piano-forte accompaniment
- Walter Kittredge (1866), Life's Cares
- More than One hundred Things Worth Knowing; We would suggest that this book be placed where it can be readily found, as it will prove useful nearly every day, and an occasion may occur when by reference to it you will avoid many dollars of expense, relieve much suffering: add to your own comfort, or, perhaps, save a life, c. 1866
- George Edward Clark (1867), Seven Years of a Sailor's Life, OL 14041883M
- Mrs. H.A. Adams (1868), Dawn, OCLC 5852142, OL 6964239M
- Lizzie Doten (1868), The Inner Mystery: an inspirational poem
- William Bull Wright (1868), Highland Rambles, OL 24388466M
- Hudson Tuttle (1869), The Career of the God-Idea in History, OL 13998747M
- S.H. Morse, ed. (c. 1860s), The Radical, A religious magazine
- Holiday Journal of parlor plays, magic sports, fireside games, pleasing experiments, practical jokes, queer problems, puzzles, riddles, charades, rebusses, enigmas, anagrams, transpositions, conundrums, &c., 1870
- The Lyceum Guide: a collection of songs, hymns, and chants, lessons, readings, and recitations, marches and calisthenics (with illustrations) together with programmes and exercises for special occasions, 1870
- Abraham P. Pierce (1870). The Revelator: being an account of the twenty-one days' entrancement of Abraham P. Pierce, spirit-medium, at Belfast, Maine: together with a sketch of his life.
- Hudson Tuttle (1871), Arcana of Spiritualism, OL 24616133M
- Christmas Bells: An illustrated holiday journal, 1870s
- Sports and Games (magazine), 1870s
