= Balderdash (game show) =

American television panel game show

- Presented by: Elayne Boosler
- Announcer: John Moschitta, Jr.
- Country of origin: United States
- Original language: English
- No. of seasons: 1

Production
- Production companies: The Hatchery, LLC; Mattel

Original release
- Network: PAX TV
- Release: August 2, 2004 – February 4, 2005

Balderdash is an American television panel game show that aired on PAX TV from August 2, 2004, to February 4, 2005, with repeats airing until April 22, 2005. It was hosted by Elayne Boosler and announced by John Moschitta. The game was based on the board game of the same name, which in turn is based on the parlour game Fictionary.

== Gameplay ==
=== Main game ===
Two contestants competed over the course of three rounds to determine the veracity of statements made by three celebrities. The two contestants began the first round with 250 points. Boosler gave the contestants a category and the contestants placed a wager. The question was then read to the panel and each celebrity gave an answer. Two of the answers were wrong ("balderdash"), and one celebrity had the correct answer ("truth"). Once the answers were given, the contestants chose a celebrity and whether they thought their answer was truth or balderdash. Correctly identifying a balderdash answer added the amount of the wager to the contestant's score, while correctly identifying an answer as truth paid off at double the wager. Incorrect answers simply lost the amount of the wager.

In the second round, 500 points were added to the contestants' scores. Two questions were played and a minimum of 250 points had to be wagered on each question. If either contestant had less than 250 points after the first question, they would be forced to bet all of their points on the second question.

In the third and final round, the contestants were given an additional 1,000 points. In this round, both of the contestants sought out the panelist with the truth for 2:1 odds. They were also required to bet at least half of their score, and their wagers were not revealed until after the correct answer was revealed. Whoever was ahead after this round won the game and advanced to the Balderdash Barrage bonus round for a chance to win a trip.

=== Balderdash Barrage ===
The champion chose one of the celebrity panelists as their teammate for the Balderdash Barrage. Ten monitors were displayed, each with one letter in the word "Balderdash.” The champion was shown up to nine statements, all of which ended with a Balderdash word or phrase (similar to the Gauntlet of Villains from the CBS game show Whew!). If the champion could not correct the statement, the celebrity was given a chance to give the correct response.

The round was played for 45 seconds, and each correct answer eliminated one of the letters in "Balderdash.” Giving nine correct answers before time ran out automatically won the contestant a trip. Otherwise, the champion faced whatever monitors were left and chose one. The trip was hidden behind one of the monitors, while the other(s) hid a secondary prize (usually a spa package). Toward the end of Balderdash's run, the rules were adjusted so that if the champion gave nine correct answers within 45 seconds, he/she won both prizes.
