= Carnelli (disambiguation) =

Carnelli may refer to:

- Carnelli, parlor game
- Carnelli (surname), a surname

== See also ==
- Carnielli
