= Steve Woodmore =

British salesman, comedian and fast talker (1959–2023)

- Born: Stephen Peter Woodmore; 13 December 1959; Hackney, London, England
- Died: 6 February 2023 (aged 63)
- Occupation: Electronics salesman
- Known for: Being the fastest English speaker in the world

Stephen Peter Woodmore (13 December 1959 – 6 February 2023) was a British electronics salesman known for his rapid speech articulation, being able to articulate 637 words per minute (wpm), a speed four times faster than the average person. Woodmore was listed by the Guinness Book of World Records as the world's fastest talker, taking the record from John Moschitta Jr. in August 1990. Woodmore lost his record in 1995, when Sean Shannon from Canada was able to articulate 655 wpm.

== Career ==
=== Fastest talker ===
Steve Woodmore could rapidly articulate at a rate of 637 words per minute, four times faster than the average human.

Woodmore first realised his skills at rapid speech when he was seven years old. At school, he was asked by his form teacher to recite an 8-minute speech, as a punishment for his talkativeness. It took him only two minutes.

On the ITV television show Motor Mouth on 22 September 1990, Steve Woodmore recited a piece from the Tom Clancy novel "Patriot Games" in 56 seconds, yielding an average rate of 637 words per minute, breaking the previous record of 586 wpm, set by John Moschitta Jr. Guinness World Records listed Woodmore as the world's fastest talker.

His ability to articulate at such a fast rate is apparently due to him recruiting more portions of his brain to the task than the average person, as shown in an fMRI scan.

=== Reality television ===
Woodmore has appeared on numerous television and radios shows, including BBC's 1Xtra Breakfast Show with Twin B and the documentary Stan Lee's Superhumans.

=== Electronics salesman ===
Woodmore worked as an electronics salesman for Currys.

== Other appearances ==
In June 2011, Woodmore launched the 5050 Phone a Friend nationwide competition, together with John Lonergan, at an event held in Dublin, in which the Irish public was challenged to beat Woodmore's world record of 637 wpm live on television. The finals were held on 10 September 2011.

== Personal life and death ==
Woodmore was born in Hackney, London on 13 December 1959. He lived in Chislehurst and was divorced with four children.

Woodmore died of COVID-19 and non-Hodgkin's lymphoma on 6 February 2023, at the age of 63.

== See also ==
- Tachylalia, term for extremely rapid speech
- Fran Capo, the fastest female speaker
