= John Moschitta Jr. =

American actor (born 1954)

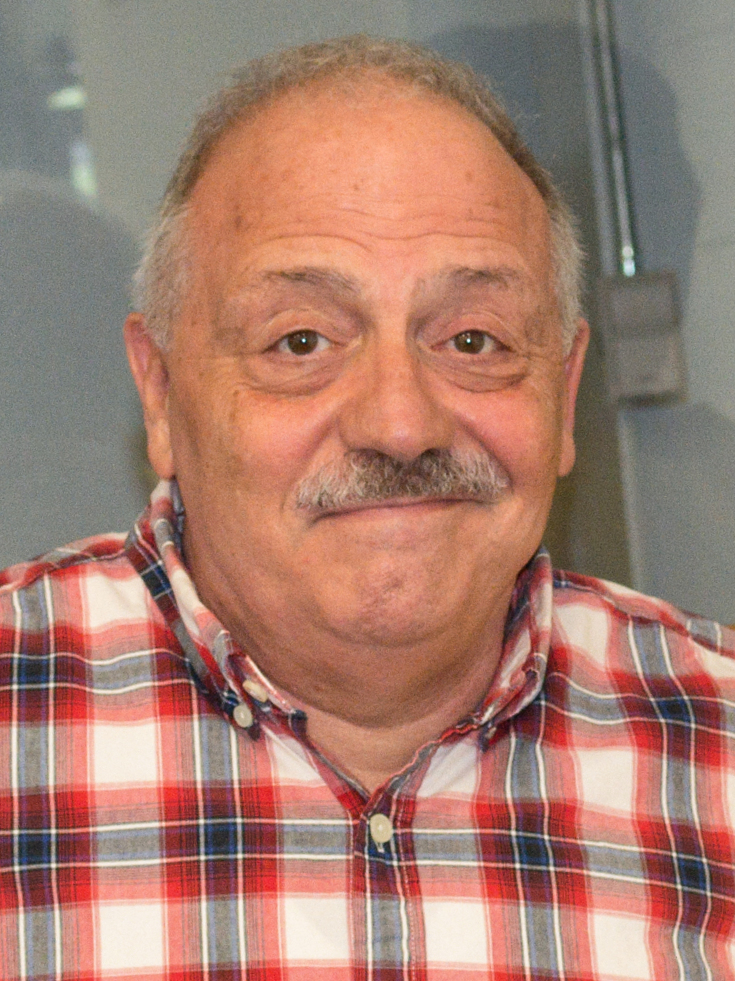
- Moschitta Jr. in 2015
- Born: August 6, 1954 (age 71); New York City, New York, U.S.
- Other names: Motormouth, The Fast-Talking Guy
- Occupations: Actor; spokesperson
- Years active: 1976–present

John "Motormouth" Moschitta Jr. (born August 6, 1954), also known as The Fast-Talking Guy, is an American actor. He is best known for his rapid speech delivery. He appeared in over 100 commercials as "The Micro Machines Guy" and in a 1981 ad for FedEx. He provided the voice for Blurr in The Transformers: The Movie (1986), The Transformers (1986–1987), Transformers: Animated (2008–2009) and two direct-to-video films.

Moschitta had been credited by Guinness World Records as the "World's Fastest Talker", with the ability to articulate 586 words per minute. His record was broken in 1990 by Steve Woodmore, who spoke 637 words per minute and then by Sean Shannon, who spoke 655 words per minute on August 30, 1995. However, Moschitta questions the legitimacy of those who claim to be faster than he is.

== Early life ==
John Moschitta Jr. was born on August 6, 1954 in New York City to an Italian-American family.

== Career ==
=== FedEx commercial ===
In 1981, Moschitta appeared on the ABC TV series That's Incredible!, where he recited the lyrics from "Ya Got Trouble" from The Music Man. The appearance led to many other television offers, such as The Tonight Show and The Merv Griffin Show. Also, after seeing the show, Patrick Kelly and Michael Tesch, employees of the Ally & Gargano ad agency, hired Moschitta to appear in a FedEx commercial; the package-delivery company was then still known by its original name, Federal Express. In the ad, "Fast Paced World", directed by Joe Sedelmaier, Moschitta played a fast-talking executive named Jim Spleen. The commercial garnered six Clio Awards, including Best Performance–Male award for Moschitta and earned him the nickname "Motormouth". Turn-of-the-century polls named it the Most Effective Campaign in the History of Advertising and named Moschitta the Most Effective Spokesperson. The 40th-anniversary issue of New York (October 6, 2008) listed it as number one in "The Most Memorable Advertisements Madison Avenue Ever Sold." Advertising Age ranked the ad number 11 among its "Top 100 Campaigns" in March 1999. According to Moschitta, he did 29 flawless takes of the final scene of the commercial, prompting the director to remark that he is "like a machine" who never makes mistakes. In response, Moschitta deliberately fumbled on a line, which was ultimately the take that was used in the final cut.

=== Other television work ===
He was a contestant on Pyramid in the 1970s and then was a production assistant on Pyramid producer Bob Stewart's game show Shoot for the Stars in 1977 and later played two weeks of Pyramid as a celebrity, one in 1983 and one in 1988.

In addition to his commercials for Federal Express, Moschitta completed over 750 television and radio commercials, including national campaigns for Minute Rice, Quality Inn, Northwest Airlines, Olympus Camera, Mattel, Post Cereals, Tiger Games, Continental Airlines, Burger King, ABC, NBC, CBS, PBS, HBO, Micro Machines and JetBlue.

Moschitta also appeared in a number of movies and television shows. For example, he voiced the character of Blurr in The Transformers: The Movie, and reprised the character on Transformers Animated.

Moschitta has been an announcer on two television game shows: Hollywood Squares and Balderdash.

In 2016, Moschitta appeared on an episode of Superhuman on FOX as a part of the challenge "Fast Car" in which he rapidly explained the various prices of three different vehicles to mental calculator Mike Byster, who had to calculate the sticker prices of each one correctly. The episode aired on June 26, 2017.

=== Audio recordings ===
In 1986, Moschitta recorded a spoken-word album entitled Ten Classics in Ten Minutes. In this recording, Moschitta summarizes ten classic literary tales in one minute each. The collection includes stories such as Herman Melville's Moby-Dick; William Shakespeare's Romeo and Juliet; F. Scott Fitzgerald's The Great Gatsby; Margaret Mitchell's Gone with the Wind; and John Steinbeck's The Grapes of Wrath.

== Selected filmography ==
=== Film ===
- Young Doctors in Love (1982) — Complaining man
- Starchaser: The Legend of Orin (1985) — Z'Gork (voice)
- The Transformers: The Movie (1986) — Blurr (voice)
- Dirty Laundry (1987) — Fast Talking Lawyer
- Going Under (1990) — Defense Contractor (as John Moschitta)
- Dick Tracy (1990) — Radio Announcer
- Blankman (1994) — Mr. Crudd
- John Bronco (2020) — Himself

=== Television ===
- Nickel Flicks (1979) — Host
- Madame's Place (1982) — Larry Lunch
- Matt Houston (1983) — Myron Chase
- The Transformers (1986–1987) — Punch / Blurr / Blowpipe (voice) (as John Moschitta)
- Sesame Street (1989) — Porter Pepper of Peter Piper "P" Products, a new baby with names from the alphabet
- Saved by the Bell (1989) — Teacher George Testaverde
- Mathnet (1991) — Johnny Dollar
- Garfield and Friends (1992) — Super Sonic Seymour (voice)
- Pinky and the Brain (1997) — Kurt Sackett (voice)
- Hollywood Squares (2003–2004) — Announcer
- Balderdash (2004–2005) — Announcer
- Robot Chicken (2007–2012) — Elrond, Azmuth, auctioneer, NASA crew member, hostage, Micro Machines Man, Trap-Jaw (voice)
- Transformers: Animated (2008–2009) — Blurr (voice)
- Family Guy episode: "Fox-y Lady" (2009) - FedEx Guy (voice)
- Adventure Time (2010) — Key-per (voice)
- Oddities (2013) — Himself

=== Video games ===
- Lego Dimensions (2015) - Key-per

== See also ==
- Fran Capo, fastest female speaker
- Tachylalia, term for extremely rapid speech
