= Veronica Clare =

American crime drama television series

- Genre: Crime drama
- Created by: Jeffrey Bloom
- Starring: Laura Robinson; Robert Beltran; Tony Plana; Christina Pickles; Robert Ruth; Robert Sutton; Wayne Chou
- Composer: Gil Mellé
- Country of origin: United States
- Original language: English
- No. of seasons: 1
- No. of episodes: 9

Production
- Executive producers: Jeffrey Bloom; Chad Hoffman
- Producers: Sascha Schneider; Anthony Santa Croce; Scott Citron
- Production locations: Los Angeles, California
- Cinematography: Edward J. Pei
- Editor: Maureen O'Connell
- Running time: 60 minutes
- Production companies: Hearst Entertainment, Inc.

Original release
- Network: Lifetime
- Release: July 23 – September 17, 1991

Veronica Clare is an American crime drama created by Jeffrey Bloom that aired nine episodes on Lifetime between July and September 1991. The title character, played by Laura Robinson, is a private investigator and the co-owner of a restaurant and jazz club in Chinatown, Los Angeles. She pursues only cases that interest her, often finding these herself, and refuses payment. Clare solves cases using her intelligence and intuition. The supporting characters consist of her close friends and co-workers, played by Robert Beltran, Tony Plana, Christina Pickles, Robert Ruth, Robert Sutton, and Wayne Chou. The series incorporates elements of film noir.

Lifetime developed Veronica Clare as one of its first original scripted programs, along with The Hidden Room and Confessions of Crime. Bloom created the show's premise after imagining Lauren Bacall as a Los Angeles detective. Gil Mellé composed the soundtrack, which uses jazz to create its ambience. Episodes were shot in May and June 1991 in a television studio in the San Fernando Valley and on-location in Los Angeles.

After nine of its commissioned 13 episodes aired, Lifetime placed Veronica Clare on hiatus and later canceled it. The series was not released on DVD or any streaming service. In 1991 and 1992, the episodes were rebroadcast as four television movies. Critics praised Bloom's script for the first episode, but criticized the show's storylines, look, and tone as well as Robinson's performance. The series attracted feminist analysis with a focus on Clare's role as a female private investigator.

== Premise ==
=== Story and characters ===
The title character of Veronica Clare (Laura Robinson) is a private investigator and partial owner of an Art Deco restaurant and jazz club in Chinatown, Los Angeles. Clare often investigates cases that help women while using her club as a place to meet potential clients and suspects. She is the show's narrator, and at the end of each episode, she writes about her cases to a former lover in letters signed "Love, Veronica". However, she does not mail any of these letters, and the name and gender of her lover are never explicitly stated. (Note: The Associated Press's Jay Sharbutt identifies Clare's lover as a man who has left town, while scholar Susan White says she is writing to her dead lover Michael and refers to him as a former US Marine.) Throughout the series, Clare is portrayed as mysterious, although there were plans to explore more of her past in future episodes had the show continued beyond its first season. In the pilot episode, a flashback provides some information on her backstory, and she is referenced as a detective's daughter.

Clare only accepts cases that interest her and refuses any payment for her work. The series has very few action scenes as Clare does not perform hand-to-hand combat with men or participate in car chases. Although she owns a Walther PPK, she uses it only for self-defense; political theorist Philip Green wrote that the series portrays Clare's "skill as a private investigator" as her "weapons". Television critic Mark Dawidziak described Clare as operating on her own "extremely personal code of ethics" throughout the episodes. According to author Derrick Bang and the Associated Press's Jerry Buck, the series portrays Clare as a "private eyeful", and Buck explained this was done through scenes in which she uses her "seductive charms" during investigations. Clare often uses her intelligence and intuition for her cases, and because of this, Robinson described the show as a "cerebral drama" about "the cat-and-mouse game played by Veronica and her adversaries".

Robinson characterized Clare as a loner, and Dawidziak noted that she had few close friends. Clare lives alone in a hotel suite, a living situation that media studies scholar Eithne Johnson called "impersonal" and "anti-domestic". Despite this, the Missoulian's Jon Burlingame noted that the show often surrounds her with "offbeat settings and people". She co-owns her club with Duke Rado (Robert Beltran), who is the show's male lead character. Green argued the series presents Rado only as Clare's business partner, and not as her love interest or as a "source of wisdom and authorization for her". Clare's best friend is Kelsey Horne (Christina Pickles), a former spy who owns a store selling rare books. Nikki Swarcek (Tony Plana), a Polish expatriate and a lieutenant for the Los Angeles Police Department, is attracted to Clare. Other supporting characters include Sergeant Tweed (Robert Ruth), bartender Rocco (Robert Sutton), and valet Jimmy (Wayne Chou). Series creator Jeffrey Bloom emphasized Veronica Clare was not focused on its ensemble cast, explaining "they're in for 10 percent of the time [while] Veronica is there 100 percent".

=== Style and comparisons ===
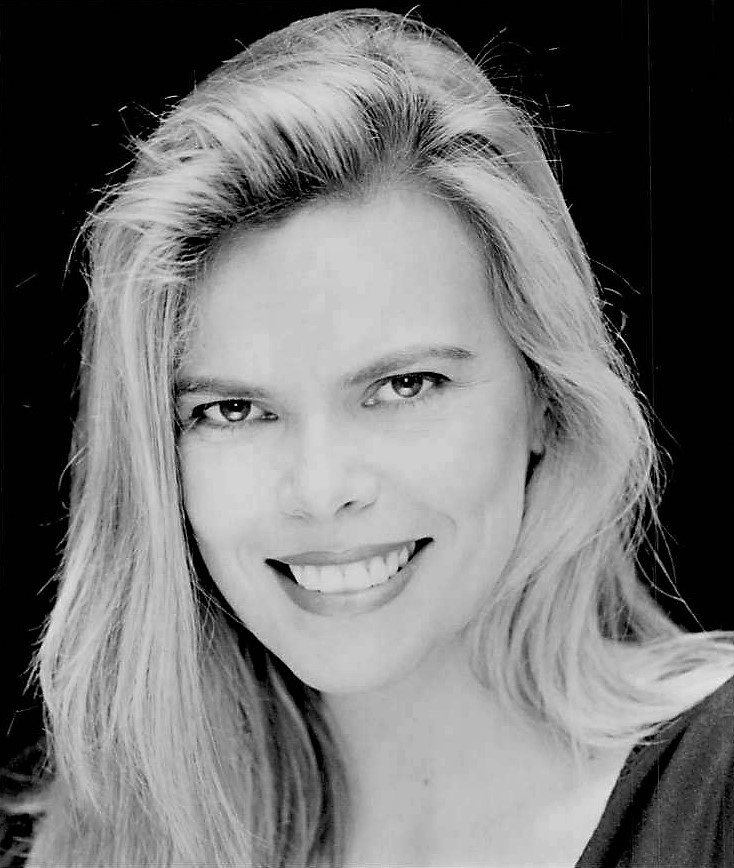
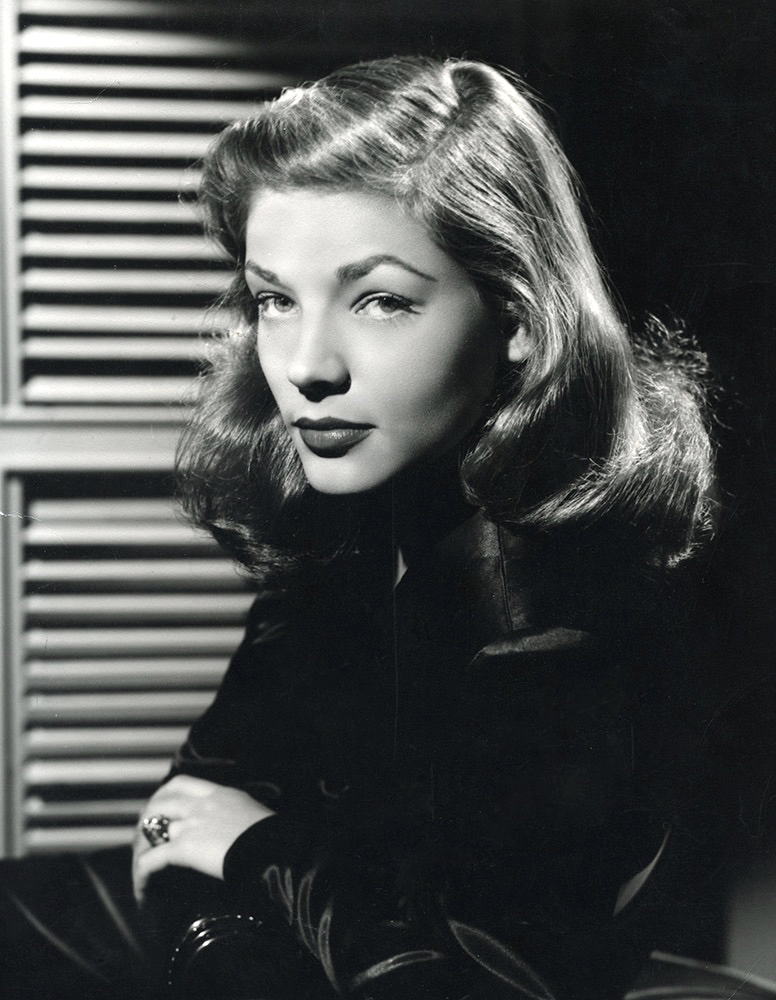
Critics have likened Veronica Clare, played by Laura Robinson (pictured left in 1987), to Lauren Bacall (pictured right in 1945) and discussed how the series uses elements from 1940s film noir.

Veronica Clare borrows elements from film noir, including "first-person narration, smoke-filled rooms, period cars and skin-tight dresses". Clare is shown driving a vintage white Mercedes coupe. Episodes also include camera angles similar to those used in noir films. Bonnie Baker, writing for The Arizona Republic, described the series as resembling "a '40s movie that's been colorized by Ted Turner". While episodes draw inspiration from detective fiction published in the 1940s, Dawidziak viewed its stories as having a more "90s sensibility".

Journalists considered Veronica Clare to be similar to detective fiction by Raymond Chandler and Dashiell Hammett. Critics characterized the series' tone as "low-key", specifically in reference to its narration, as well as cold and distant. Episodes have elements of humor, such as when Clare's aunt said she could tell a gangster was a "man of dubious integrity" because "he never even provided a pension plan".

The series frequently uses jazz, which was composed by Gil Mellé, as part of its ambience. Some of these instances are diegetic as Clare's club features jazz music, which is sometimes played with "unusual combos" of instruments such as a combination of piano, bass guitar, and accordion. The show's background music often features covers of George Gershwin and Cole Porter's music, such as a jazz version of the 1926 song "Someone to Watch Over Me", and the theme music has a "bluesy sax, piano and bass".

Critics compared Clare to Veronica Lake and Veronica Clare to a 1940s noir starring Lauren Bacall as the private investigator instead of Humphrey Bogart. Television historians Tim Brooks and Earle F. Marsh believed this "Lauren Bacall look" was evoked by Clare's hairstyle and mysterious persona. While promoting Veronica Clare, Robinson referred to her character as a combination of Bogart's strength and intelligence as well as Bacall's looks and wit. She also viewed Clare as an adult version of Nancy Drew, but doubted that the show's producers shared her opinion. Journalists have associated the character with other fictional detectives, such as Mike Hammer, Nick Charles, Philip Marlowe, and Sam Spade. Paul Henniger, writing for the Los Angeles Times, compared Clare's "rapid-talking, short, staccato outbursts" to Jack Webb and supporting characters to those in the television show Peter Gunn.

== Production ==
=== Background ===
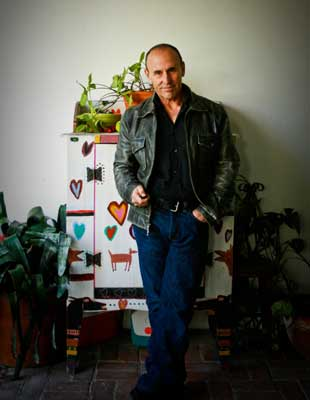
Jeffrey Bloom (pictured) created Veronica Clare, which Lifetime picked up as one of its first original scripted programs.

Television network Lifetime developed Veronica Clare in 1991 as one of three original scripted programs, along with The Hidden Room and Confessions of Crime. Each of the shows feature elements of mystery or suspense; The Record's Virginia Mann described Veronica Clare as having the lightest tone of the three programs. This was the first time Lifetime had its own television shows, although in 1989, the network acquired The Days and Nights of Molly Dodd to produce new episodes following its NBC cancelation. Mass communication professor Eileen R. Meehan and media studies professor Jackie Byars identified these shows as part of an "emergent period" of Lifetime, describing them as the network's "first experiments" with original dramas.

In 1991, Patricia Fili, the senior vice president of Lifetime's programming, explained that the network would invest $1 billion into its original programming over a decade and identified Veronica Clare as part of this strategy. Mike Hughes, while writing for the Gannett News Service, considered Veronica Clare a "crucial test of the notion that basic-cable channels can do one-hour, prime time series". Fili described the focus on television shows as a risk, but felt it was a "natural evolution" in establishing Lifetime's identity as a network.

Lifetime developed Veronica Clare, as well as The Hidden Room and Confessions of Crime, for a female audience. This follows Lifetime's tradition of acquiring shows about women in traditionally male occupations; examples include a police officer in Lady Blue, a physician in Kay O'Brien, and a private detective in Partners in Crime. Hughes wrote that Veronica Clare "mirrors the channel's view of its audience", following this up with Fili's description of Clare as attractive, intelligent, sensual, and feminine.

=== Concept and casting ===
Jeffrey Bloom developed Veronica Clare after imagining Lauren Bacall as a private investigator in Los Angeles; he referenced Bacall's roles in the films To Have and Have Not (1944), The Big Sleep (1946), Dark Passage (1947), and Key Largo (1948) as inspiration for Clare. A fan of noir, Bloom had previously worked in the genre by writing the screenplay for the 1978 film adaptation of Raymond Chandler's 1939 novel The Big Sleep. During this time period, he first considered a story about a female detective and wrote the script for the pilot episode in 1986. In a 1991 interview with The Philadelphia Inquirer, Bloom said he had difficulty pitching the series to networks, and attributed this to their resistance to air dramas with a young female lead. Lifetime picked up Veronica Clare in 1991 for 13 episodes.

Over 500 actresses auditioned for the role of Veronica Clare. To prepare for the part, Laura Robinson watched Humphrey Bogart films and styled herself like Bacall. While promoting the series, she described herself as a fan of noir, and discussed her appreciation for Bacall, Katharine Hepburn, and "those kinds of characters who could balance strength and femininity". Before Veronica Clare, Robinson was typecast as a villain or a femme fatale; an example of this was her role as P'Gell Roxton in a 1987 television pilot based on the comic book character Spirit. While reflecting on this in a 1991 interview, she suggested it was either her voice or her eyes that inspired those casting choices. She viewed Clare as a welcome career change, explaining: "Playing a woman who is strong and resourceful, and also sexy and feminine and all those things is great." Bloom attributed Robinson's casting to her "tremendous sense of confidence about herself" in her audition, and said she physically looked like how he imagined Clare.

=== Production and filming ===
Veronica Clare was produced by Hearst Entertainment, Inc. Bloom served as the show's executive producer alongside Chad Hoffman. Sascha Schneider was the supervising producer, Anthony Santa Croce the show's producer, and Scott Citron a co-producer. The series was filmed in May and June 1991. Episodes were shot in a television studio in the San Fernando Valley. The studio was an old factory, and during an interview with the Toronto Star, Robinson recounted how nearby trains could be so loud that there would sometimes be breaks in filming. Scenes were also shot on-location in Los Angeles.

Various Los Angeles locations are featured as postcards, which are shown as transitions between each episode's acts. The show's production designer was Shay Austin, and according to a writer from Variety, his designs focused on "a colorful nitery and its street location". Edward J. Pei was the cinematographer and Maureen O'Connell was the editor. For his work on the show, Pei received the ACE Award for Direction of Photography and/or Lighting in a Comedy or Dramatic Series at the 13th Annual ACE awards.

Each episode cost $700,000, which was cheaper than shows aired on network television. Bloom said he did not take foreign investments, instead keeping expenses low by hiring a small staff of producers and writers. In a 1991 article for the Writers Guild of America West, writer Lee Goldberg identified a trend in U.S. networks working with foreign companies to lower production costs. According to Goldberg, a majority of the shows aired on cable networks had foreign investments, and he noted Veronica Clare was one of the few exceptions. Bloom wrote and directed the first episode "Veronica's Aunt". Directors for the subsequent episodes were Mark Cullingham, Deborah Dalton, Donna Deitch, Amy Goldstein, Leon Ichaso, Frederick King Keller, and Rafal Zielinski.

== Episodes ==
No.	Title (Note: Some newspaper listings name the final episode "Veronica Clare" instead of "Pilot".)	Written by	Original release date
1	"Veronica's Aunt"	Jeffrey Bloom	July 23, 1991
Veronica helps her aunt when she is threatened by her recently deceased husband's mob employers.
2	"Reed"	Jeffrey Bloom	July 30, 1991
Veronica works on a mystery that involves one of Duke's close friends.
3	"Anonymous"	Jeffrey Bloom	August 6, 1991
After an amnesiac Romanian woman is found severely beaten, Veronica tries to help her remember her past and locate her attacker.
4	"The Boxing Story"	Jeffrey Bloom and Frank Megna	August 13, 1991
A female boxing manager hires Veronica to determine why her most popular boxer chose to abandon her career.
5	"Phoebe"	Jeffrey Bloom	August 20, 1991
Veronica helps a woman locate her missing husband.
6	"Slow Violence"	Nancy Bond	August 27, 1991
A club singer pushes Veronica into babysitting her child and then suddenly disappears.
7	"Mr. Duvall"	Jane Atkins	September 3, 1991
Veronica is tasked with finding the missing wife of a wealthy man.
8	"Love, Amanda"	Nina Shengold	September 10, 1991
Veronica tries to discover what is behind a young girl's murder by piecing together clues from her diary.
9	"Pilot"	Jeffrey Bloom	September 17, 1991
Veronica is assigned to find a man's brooch, which is believed to have been stolen by his son.

== Broadcast history ==
Veronica Clare aired on Tuesdays at 10:00 pm EST, and reruns were broadcast on Saturdays at the same time. The series was shown after The Hidden Room and Confessions of Crime as a two-hour programming block, promoted as "Lifetime Original Night" and "Mystery Loves Company". On September 24, 1991, Lifetime put Veronica Clare on hiatus. Although 11 episodes were filmed, only nine were aired. Publicist C. Alex Wagner attributed this decision to production issues, and explained: "We're stopping production to rewrite and retool. We are committed to the series." Wagner added that Lifetime still had an interest in airing a show about a female private investigator.

Despite this statement, Lifetime canceled the series. According to Derrick Bang, the cancelation occurred because of "weak scripts, inadequate publicity and too much competition from the established networks". The Baltimore Sun's Steve McKerrow felt it was a surprising choice, writing that shows for niche markets did not require immediate high ratings when compared to network television. He described Veronica Clare's ratings as "pretty respectable", and reported that Media Monitor considered the series to have "some promise". Veronica Clare, along with The Hidden Room and Confessions of a Crime, had lower ratings than Lifetime's original films. Wagner said the three shows performed well for women between the ages of 18 and 49, and believed the ratings could have improved with time. Veronica Clare had the lowest average ratings among the three. Lifetime continued to broadcast reruns of the show until June 13, 1992. A 1991 issue of Broadcasting reported that the first six episodes of Veronica Clare had averaged a 0.8% of Lifetime's 51 million household audience.

The series was not released on DVD or any streaming service. In 1991 and 1992, the nine episodes were converted into four 90-minute television movies. They can be requested through the Library of Congress as video reels. The titles of these films are Affairs with Death, Deadly Minds, Naked Hearts, and Slow Violence. In 2020, Bang wrote that Veronica Clare, as well as Gil Mellé's score, are "nowhere to be found in today's market".

== Reception ==
=== Critical reception ===
Critics praised Jeffrey Bloom's script for "Veronica's Aunt". Jay Sharbutt, while writing for the Associated Press, liked that Bloom put "a lot of verbal playfulness" in the episode. Sharbutt appreciated the show's lack of violence, and felt Bloom distinguished Clare from "today's hordes of wild-eyed geeks fresh from the University of Uzi". In the Los Angeles Times, Howard Rosenberg commended Bloom's script as having a "subtlety and a charming playfulness", but felt the show's quality rapidly deteriorated with its subsequent episodes. Rosenberg panned the second episode "Reed" for its plot holes and unintentional comedy, comparing its campy tone to the 1991 film The Naked Gun 2½: The Smell of Fear. While reviewing "Veronica's Aunt", Mark Dawidziak appreciated how Bloom balanced the episode's plot with its 1940s noir aesthetic, but believed it was "at times too deliberate and plodding to sustain the pace". Despite this criticism, Dawidziak felt the series had potential and wrote: "It would be a crime if [Bloom] doesn't chase down the obvious remaining clues to success."

Veronica Clare received criticism for its storylines, which reviewers described as unoriginal and unlikely. Paul Henniger and The News Journal's Valerie Helmbreck found its premise to be derivative of previous detective stories. Citing the show as a negative example of Hollywood's fixation with Raymond Chandler, Helmbreck believed the episodes relied too much on clichés and stock characters. When Lifetime promoted Veronica Clare as "original steamy and seductive", Henniger wondered how a show about a Los Angeles private investigator could be considered original. Despite enjoying its style, a Variety writer felt the series had too many implausible plots and believed this would result in its cancelation.

Reviewers were critical of the show's look and tone, including comments on Clare's role as a detective and the application of film noir elements to a more contemporary story. Scholar Susan White thought the attempt to emulate a 1940s setting was not successfully translated to 1990s Los Angeles. People's David Hiltbrand considered the show's characterization of Clare as a female Sam Spade to be "murky and contrived". Mike Hughes and a writer for The Times Herald found Veronica Clare to be too reserved; when discussing the programming block, they instead recommended The Hidden Room for viewers who wanted a more emotional experience.

Laura Robinson's acting was the subject of criticism. A Variety reviewer and Hiltbrand did not believe she brought enough believability to the role. As part of a negative review of the series, Helmbreck described Robinson as "an actress better suited to car commercials where sultry blondes only stroke gearshifts or hood ornaments and make animal sounds for their paycheck". Although he enjoyed the show's concept and writing, Sharbutt felt it was undercut by Robison's flat performance of her lines. Despite this, he hoped she would improve over time, and wrote "all the star has to do is live up to the promise of the show's premise". While promoting Veronica Clare to critics, Robinson apologized for one of the early episodes and explained: "We're just getting the kinks out now on later episodes and starting to roll." She said that she had a tendency to talk fast and was consciously working on it during filming. In more positive reviews, Dawidziak and Bonnie Baker praised Robinson as ideally cast for the role.

=== Gender analysis ===
Following the show's premiere, journalists associated Veronica Clare with a rising interest in stories about female detectives. The Orlando Sentinel's Nancy Pate cited the series, as well as the 1991 film adaptation of Sara Paretsky's V. I. Warshawski novels and Sue Grafton's success with Kinsey Millhone, as examples supporting this trend. Eithne Johnson believed Lifetime produced the show after seeing the popularity of Murder, She Wrote and Moonlighting. While discussing Veronica Clare as potentially having cultural importance, The Baltimore Sun critic David Zurawik remarked that Clare fits with the "boom of women writing and starring in mystery fiction". Rosenberg questioned the representation of female investigators, writing: "Beyond male biases among network programmers, there's no reason at all for female detectives to be such a TV curiosity."

Veronica Clare and its title character have been the subject of academic analysis on gender. Cinema studies professor Linda Mizejewski believed Clare was another example of the "profile of enigmatic, noir detective heroine" used by other television shows. While interpreting Clare as a postfeminist character, film professor Nicholas de Villers wrote that the series consciously addresses the "gender expectations raised by her unusual occupation as a lone, female sleuth". Philip Green considered Clare an instance in which a heroine is not represented as a "fetishized male in disguise". Green wrote that the series identifies Clare's skills as separate from "masculine toughness" or "hypermasculine aggression" and focuses on her beauty without reducing her to "pure feminized sexuality".

Gender and women's studies scholar Susan White noted that Veronica Clare's fashion and scenic design was a sharp contrast to the "codes of the hardboiled narrative and style". She questioned whether Clare's dual role as femme fatale and detective would ever connect with an audience, and felt her "restrained, smoldering sexuality" seemingly contradicted her "emphatic or identificatory modus operandi". While discussing Clare's frequent costume changes, Johnson associated the series with fashion photography and thought "Robinson's body was packaged and posed for the viewers' contemplation". Johnson argued Clare had the same attributes as other hardboiled detectives, while also operating with "the fashionably autonomous manner of the idealized careerist".
