= Carnelli (surname) =

Carnelli is an Italian surname. Notable people with the surname include:

- Lorenzo Carnelli (1887 – 1960), Uruguayan lawyer and politician
- María Luisa Carnelli (1898 –1987), Argentine writer, poet, and journalist

== See also ==
- Carnelli (disambiguation)
