= Nickel Flicks =

American television series

- Logotype for the series, used on promotional materials and news advertisements.
- Presented by: John Moschitta Jr.
- Country of origin: United States
- No. of seasons: 1
- No. of episodes: 110

Production
- Producer: John Moschitta Jr.
- Running time: 1 hour

Original release
- Network: Nickelodeon
- Release: April 1, 1979 – December 1979

Nickel Flicks is an American television series that premiered on Nickelodeon in 1979 as one of the network's inaugural programs, and the first original series created for the channel after its launch. It showcased "cliffhanger" serials from the 1920s to the 1940s, in addition to early comic one-reelers and silent short films. It was hosted by producer John Moschitta, who later became famous as the "World's Fastest Talker" in commercials for FedEx. This was Moschitta's first on-camera television role. Nickel Flicks was notably the first Nickelodeon show to be cancelled and the shortest-lived out of Nickelodeon's inaugural series; according to Moschitta, it was cancelled due to complaints about the violent nature of many of the serials.

Since the features on Nickel Flicks had been created prior to the advance of color television, most of the program was presented in black and white. The only exception were the segments featuring Moschitta, which were taped in color at the QUBE studios in Columbus, Ohio. The program aired three times every day from April 1979 until November or December of 1979. Taping finished in July 1979, when Moschitta moved to Los Angeles. Nickel Flicks is the only show on the network not to last beyond the 1970s and the first Nickelodeon program to end.

It is a more recent example of a lost television program, due to the lack of recorded tape that exists. According to a podcast interview, Saturday Morning Rewind, tapes existed, but were lost in a storage unit.

== Overview ==
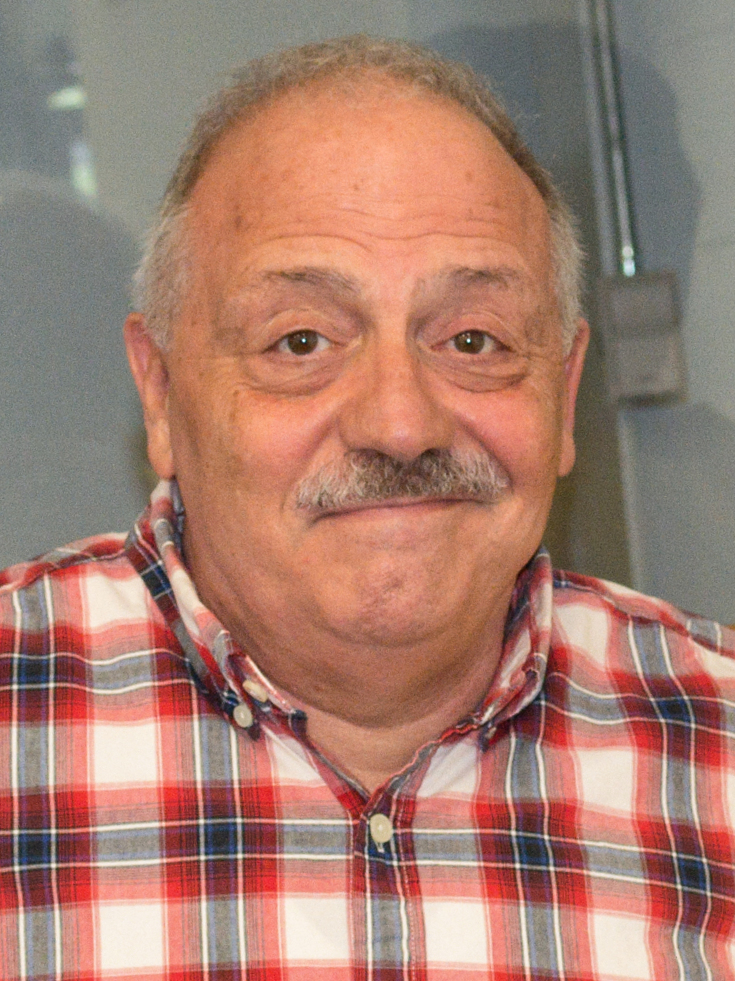
Host John Moschitta.

Slapstick comedy serials made up the majority of the content on Nickel Flicks. Comic violence, which was rare in children's programming at the time, was not edited out of most of the films that were shown; it was even advertised as kids' programming "with no sugar-coating." Cable executive Bill Riley stated that "any violence [on the program] is either less intense than that found on commercial television or is clearly intended as comedy." Dated suspense films aimed at a family audience were occasionally shown as well. The show was not just a showcase but a "public affairs program as well." Moschitta, in his own words, played "a Sydney Greenstreet kind of character in a white suit", wearing a pith helmet or panama hat, and sat in a large rattan chair. During Moschitta's host segments, public affairs issues related to the plots or stars of the showcased films were discussed.

== Films ==
- The Galloping Ghost (1931)
- The Whispering Shadow (1933), starring Bela Lugosi
- The Mystery Squadron (1933)
- Junior G-Men (1940)

== Featured artists ==
The following artists' works were featured on the program:

- Buster Crabbe (as Flash Gordon in the eponymous serial)
- Tom Mix (as Tom Morgan in The Miracle Rider)
- Roscoe Arbuckle
- Gene Autry
- Charlie Chaplin
- Bela Lugosi
- Roy Rogers
- John Wayne
- Rex the Wonder Horse

== Reception ==
The Courier-Post described the offerings on Nickel Flicks as "wholesome." The Philadelphia Inquirer labeled the series "a collection some of the best kids shows from previous years."
