= Fran Capo =

Fran Capo is an American motivational keynote speaker, comedienne, voice-over artist and author. She is the holder of 9 world records, most known as the Guinness Book of World Records Fastest Speaking woman, clocked at 603.32 wpm. She broke her 9th world record while on the Tedx stage when she did her 18-minute talk, then redid the entire talk in 59 seconds.

== Biography ==
Fran Capo was born in Greenwich Village in New York City. She graduated from Queens College with a BA minor in Philosophy and Major in Media & Accounting. She had perfect attendance throughout all of high school and college, and also made Arista and Dean's List.

Capo was listed in the Guinness Book of World Records (1989), Ripley's Believe it or Not! (2006) the Book of Alternative Records (2006, 2019). She is listed in the Guinness World Records as the fastest-talking female, having broken the record twice. Capo set the current record on June 5, 1990 at the Guinness Museum in Las Vegas, speaking at 603.32 wpm in 54.2 seconds. She first broke the record speaking 585 words-per-minute (wpm) on Larry King Live on March 5, 1986. Then rebroke the fast talking record at 603.32 wpm at the Guinness Museum in Las Vegas in front of Press with an adjudicator present. She has toured the world with fellow world record holders to open Guinness museums in Chicago, NYC, Singapore and Korea. Capo also holds a record for highest elevation for a book signing, as the only author to do a book-signing on top of Mount Kilimanjaro. and the deepest book signing down by the wreck site of the Titanic (Record Holders Republic). As an adventurer, she has run in the New York City Marathon, driven race cars, done zero-G, scaled a castle wall in Austria, bungee jumped, scuba-dived with sharks, walked on hot coals, and eaten fire.

Capo has appeared on over 500 television and 4,500 radio shows, including Entertainment Tonight, Larry King Live, Last Call with Carson Daly, Good Morning America, The Martha Stewart Show, the Fox News, Dog Eat Dog, Nick at Nite, “More than Human” the Discovery Channel and most recently on MTV's “What’s my secret”. She has co-hosted a TV show called, “Live it up! With Donna Drake Some of her 22 books include. “It Happened in New Jersey”, “It Happened in Pennsylvania”, “Myths and Mysteries of New York,” “Myths and Mysteries of New Jersey”. Also the true comic crime novel, “Almost a Wise Guy” and her spiritual book which hit #11 on Amazon, “Hopeville:The city of Light.” She also has written for international magazines, as well as writing a weekly blog and podcast called, Fran's World. During Covid, she did 52 episodes of Cuppa Capo on FB live.

In her capacity as a certified hypnotherapist, she created both a nighttime and morning Mindset Meditations for relaxation, positive energy, anxiety reduction, healing and peaceful sleep.

She also appeared as a contestant on a special world record holders edition of The Weakest Link in November 2002. Although, she was voted off in the first round, her humorous performance caught the eye of the producer and the very next day she was cast in “Dog eat Dog”. Currently she is listed in the pop culture app word genius as the definition of the word Loquacious.

Acting wise Capo has several movies and videos. Her music video's include, David Bowie's “Fashion” (her first video she appears 2:09 seconds in - a very funny story about how she got that appears in her stories section on her website.) She's also in Rick Springfield's Netflix documentary, “An Affair of the Heart.” Movie wise, she's in the 22 time independent short film winner, “Father and Father” (2018), Sundance Grand Award winner, “Sunday” (1997), Z Dead End (2018), the animated film “Herbie and the Smushies” (2018) etc. As comic rapper “June East” (Mae West's long lost sister), she toured with LL Cool J and the Fat Boys with her song parady, “Rappin Mae” (Billboard Magazine 1986

Capo has also been a spokesperson for many companies including Masterfoods, Auntie Anne's pretzels, Chock full o'Nuts, Perdue chicken, Citibank, and Ripley's Believe it or Not!.

After her divorce, Capo raised her son, Spencer, as a single mother in New York, with family help.

== See also ==
- John Moschitta Jr., former fastest male speaker
- Steve Woodmore, former fastest speaker
