= Parlour game =

Group game played indoors

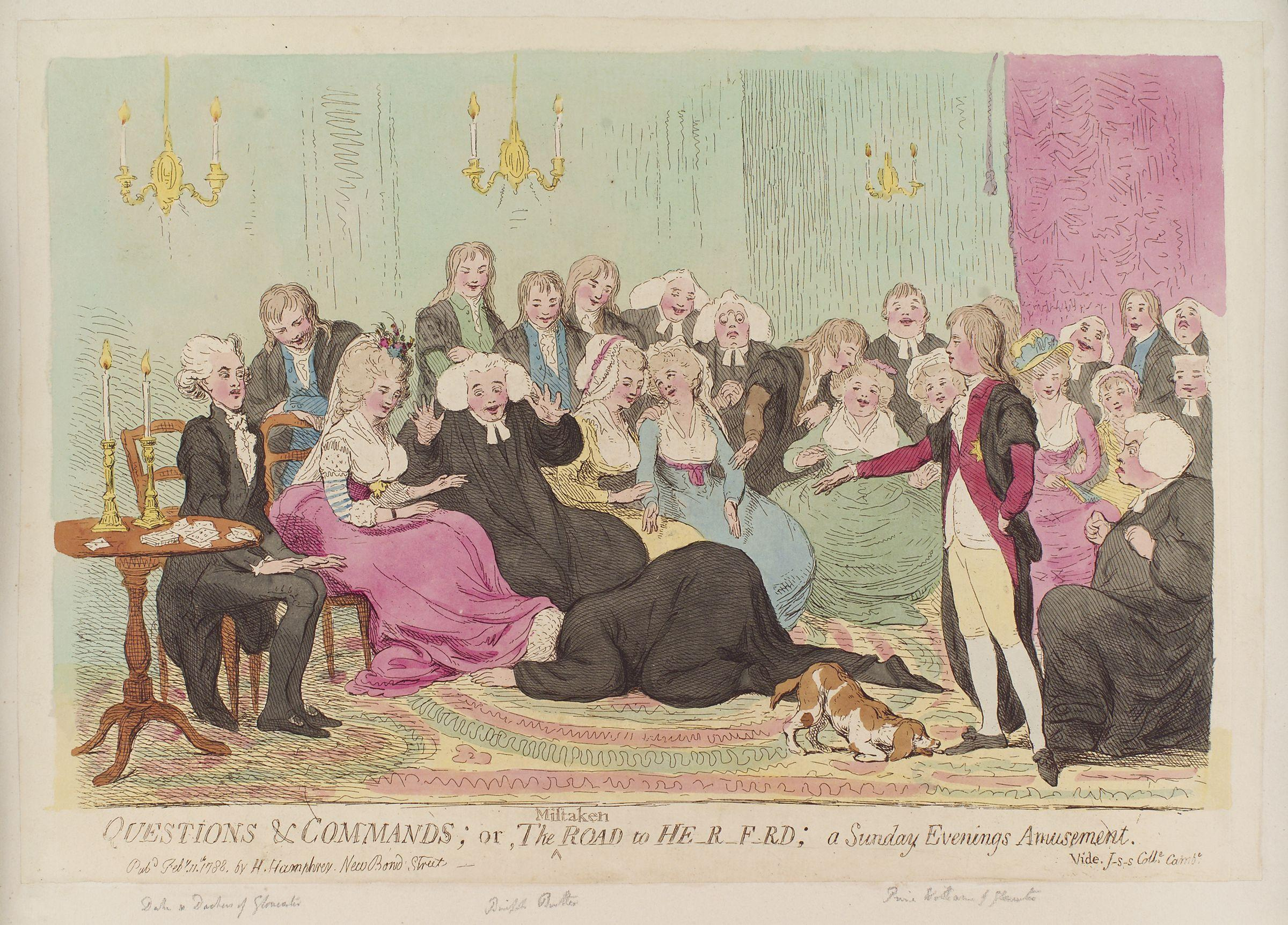
A game of "Questions and Commands" depicted by James Gillray, 1788

A parlour or parlor game is a group game played indoors, named so as they were often played in a parlour. These games were extremely popular among the upper and middle classes in the United Kingdom and in the United States during the Victorian era.

The Victorian age is sometimes considered the "Golden Age" of the parlour game. During the 19th century, the upper and middle classes had more leisure time than people of previous generations. This led to the creation of a variety of parlour games to allow these gentlemen and ladies to amuse themselves at small parties. Boxed parlour games were very popular from around 1920 until into the 1960s, especially around Christmas. Parlour games competed for attention with the mass media, particularly radio, movies, and television. Though decreased in popularity, parlour games continue to be played. Some remain nearly identical to their Victorian ancestors; others have been transformed into board games such as Balderdash.

Many parlour games involve logic or word-play. Others are more physical games, but not to the extent of a sport or exercise. Some also involve dramatic skill, such as in charades. Most do not require any equipment beyond what would be available in a typical parlour – e.g. the functioning mouths of the participants. Parlour games are usually competitive, but cumulative scores are not usually kept. The length and ending time of the game is typically not set; play continues until the players decide to end the game.

== Examples ==
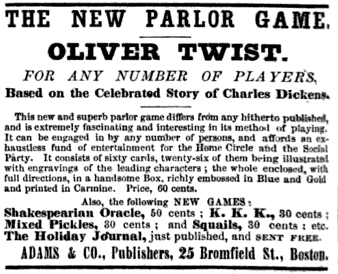
A Christmas 1867 advertisement for a parlor game called "Oliver Twist," issued by Adams & Co. of Boston and based on the story by Charles Dickens

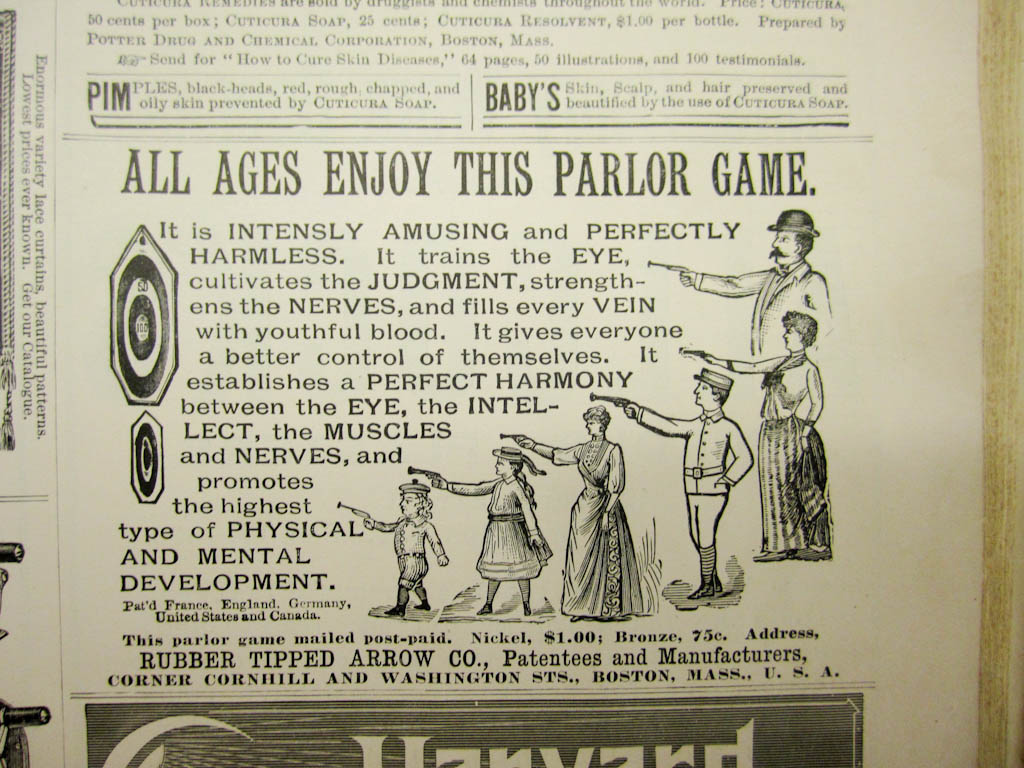
An American newspaper advertisement for a parlor game, circa 1900

Examples of parlour games include:

- Aesop's Mission
- Are you there, Moriarty?
- Carnelli
- Charades
- Consequences
- Fictionary
- Hunt the thimble
- I packed my bag
- I spy
- Kim's Game
- Mafia
- The Minister's Cat
- Six Degrees of Kevin Bacon
- Twenty questions
- Wink murder

== See also ==
- Casino game
- Drawing room
- Game of dares
- Party game
- Pub game
- Salon
- Tabletop game
