= Theresa Saldana =

American actress (1954–2016)

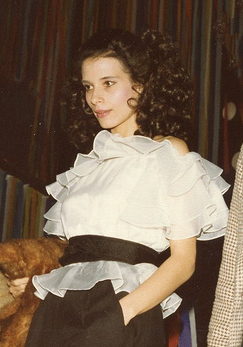
- Saldana in 1981
- Born: August 20, 1954; Brooklyn, New York, U.S.
- Died: June 6, 2016 (aged 61); Los Angeles, California, U.S.
- Occupations: Actress; activist; writer
- Years active: 1978–2004
- Spouses: Fred Feliciano (m. 1979; div. 1986) Phil Peters (m. 1989)
- Children: 1

Theresa Saldana (August 20, 1954 – June 6, 2016) was an American actress, activist, and writer. She was best known for her role as Rachel Scali on the television series The Commish (1991–96), for which she received a Golden Globe Award nomination for Best Supporting Actress – Series, Miniseries or Television Film.

Saldana's other notables roles included a teen Beatles fan in Robert Zemeckis' Beatlemania comedy I Wanna Hold Your Hand (1978) and as Lenora LaMotta in Martin Scorsese's Raging Bull (1980). She was also known for raising public awareness of the crime of stalking after surviving a knife attack by an obsessed fan at her home in 1982.

== Early life ==
Saldana was born in the Brooklyn borough of New York City, and was adopted at five days old by Divina and Tony Saldana, a family of Puerto Rican and Italian-American heritage.

Saldana took dance lessons as a child. After suffering a serious shoulder injury while part of a tumbling team, she enrolled in acting classes at age 12. After being spotted by a talent scout while performing in an Off Broadway musical called The New York City Street Show in 1977, she was cast in the 1978 film Nunzio.

== Stalking incident ==
Saldana was stalked by Arthur Richard Jackson, a 46-year-old drifter from Aberdeen, Scotland. Jackson became obsessed with Saldana after seeing her in the 1980 films Defiance and Raging Bull. He hired a private investigator who obtained the unlisted phone number of Saldana's mother. Jackson then called Saldana's mother and posed as Martin Scorsese's assistant, saying he needed Saldana's residential address in order to contact her for replacing an actress in a film role in Europe.

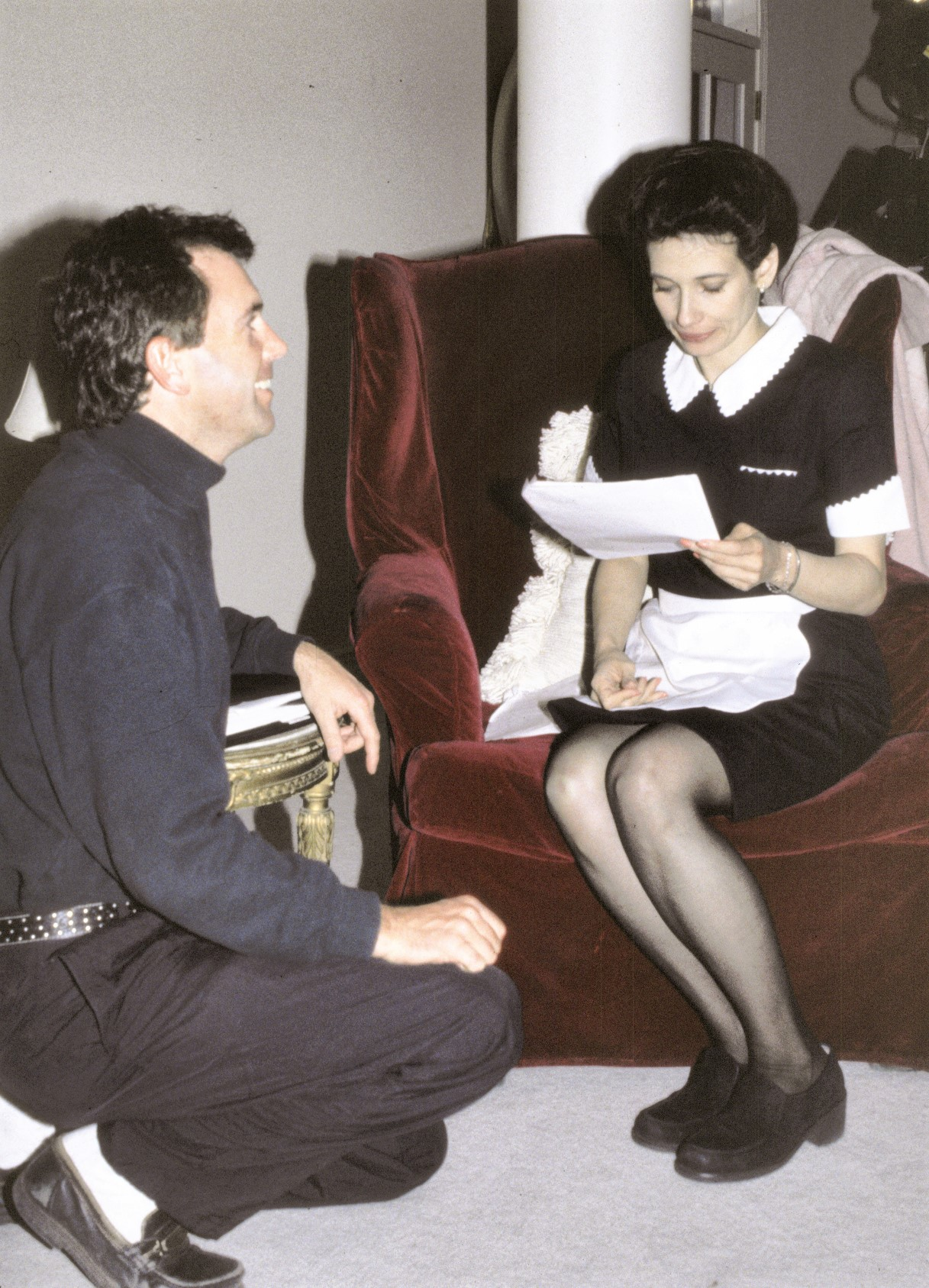
Saldana on the set of Illusion Infinity, with its filmmaker Roger Steinmann

Jackson approached Saldana in front of her West Hollywood residence in broad daylight on March 15, 1982, and repeatedly stabbed her with a 5 1/2-inch (14 cm) hunting knife, puncturing a lung. His attack was so fierce that the blade bent. Although there were many nearby onlookers, including children, the attack was interrupted only when a deliveryman, Jeff Fenn, intervened after hearing Saldana's cries, rushed from the second floor of an apartment building, and incapacitated Jackson. Following the assault, Saldana was hospitalized with 10 stab wounds and underwent a four-month hospital stay at the Motion Picture Hospital. She relived the incident in the television film Victims for Victims: The Theresa Saldana Story and again in an episode of Hunter.

Jackson served almost 14 years in prison for the assault and making subsequent threats against Saldana and her rescuer while in prison. He was then extradited to the United Kingdom in 1996 to be tried for a 1966 robbery and murder. Jackson (who once saw himself as "the benevolent angel of death") was found not guilty by diminished responsibility in 1997 and committed to a British psychiatric hospital, where he died of heart failure in 2004, at the age of 68.

Jackson's method of finding and approaching Saldana inspired stalker Robert John Bardo to hire a private investigator to contact Rebecca Schaeffer, a young TV sitcom star whom he subsequently murdered, also in West Hollywood, on July 18, 1989.

== Victim advocacy ==
Following her long recovery, Saldana founded the Victims for Victims organization and participated in lobbying for the 1990 anti-stalking law and the 1994 Driver's Privacy Protection Act, both of which came into being partly as a consequence of the attack. The experience also inspired Saldana to play herself in the television film Victims for Victims: The Theresa Saldana Story, and she authored the book Beyond Survival, a memoir of her experiences after being attacked.

== Personal life ==
Saldana's first marriage was to Fred Feliciano from February 11, 1979, to 1986. In March 1989, she married for the second time, to Phil Peters, with whom she had a daughter, Tianna Saldana Peters (born August 30, 1989, in Los Angeles). They remained together until her death.

=== Death ===
Saldana died on June 6, 2016, at age 61, after being hospitalized with pneumonia at Cedars-Sinai Medical Center. Michael Chiklis, who played Saldana's husband on The Commish, wrote that it was "painful to hear the news."

== Filmography ==
=== Film ===
| Year | Title | Role | Notes |
|---|---|---|---|
| 1978 | I Wanna Hold Your Hand | Grace Corrigan | |
| 1978 | Nunzio | Maryann | |
| 1980 | Home Movies | Judy | |
| 1980 | Defiance | Marsha | |
| 1980 | Raging Bull | Lenora LaMotta | |
| 1984 | The Evil That Men Do | Rhiana Hidalgo / Nancy | |
| 1988 | The Night Before | Rhonda | |
| 1988 | Double Revenge | Angie Corello | |
| 1989 | Of Men and Angels | Maria | |
| 1990 | Angel Town | Maria Ordonez | |
| 1999 | Carlo's Wake | Theresa Brock | |
| 2004 | Gang Warz | Carmela Cruz | |
| 2004 | Illusion Infinity | Maria | |

=== Television ===
| Year | Title | Role | Notes |
|---|---|---|---|
| 1979 | 240-Robert | Rosie | Episode: "The Applicant" |
| 1980 | Sophia Loren: Her Own Story | Maria Scicolone | TV film |
| 1981 | Nurse | Rita | Episode: "The Gifts" |
| 1983 | Seven Brides for Seven Brothers | Angelina | Episode: "Promised Land" |
| 1983 | T. J. Hooker | Maria Santini | Episode: "Too Late for Love" |
| 1983 | American Playhouse | Pregnant Again | Episode: "Miss Lonelyhearts" |
| 1984 | Victims for Victims: The Theresa Saldana Story | Herself | TV film |
| 1985 | The Twilight Zone | Inez | Episode: "Dead Woman's Shoes" |
| 1985 | Cagney & Lacey | Dr. Strathmore | Episode: "Old Ghosts" |
| 1986 | Simon & Simon | Mrs. Karnofsky | Episode: "Full Moon Blues" |
| 1986 | Matlock | Sonia Cardenas | Episode: "The Affair" |
| 1986 | Tales from the Darkside | Audrey Webster | Episode: "Black Widows" |
| 1987 | Hunter | Jennifer Hartman | Episode: "Any Second Now" |
| 1987 | Santa Barbara | Carlotta Quivar | 2 episodes |
| 1987 | CBS Schoolbreak Special | Laura Chacon | Episode: "Juvi" |
| 1987 | The Highwayman | Angela Brown | TV film |
| 1987–88 | Werewolf | Rosa | Episode: "World of Difference" |
| 1988 | Buck James | Marta Ortiz | Episode: "Lives in the Balance" |
| 1988 | Falcon Crest | Pretty Woman | Episode: "False Faces" |
| 1990 | MacGyver | Maria | Episode: "The Treasure of Manco" |
| 1990 | New Kids on the Block | Rosa (voice) | Main cast |
| 1991–96 | The Commish | Rachel Scali | Main cast |
| 1991 | Confessions of Crime | Herself | Series host |
| 1993 | Shameful Secrets | Rachel Morales | TV film |
| 1994 | Captain Planet and the Planeteers | Mame Slaughter (voice) | 2 episodes |
| 1995 | Law & Order | Juror | Episode: "House Counsel" |
| 1995 | Jonny Quest vs. The Cyber Insects | Dr. Eve Belage (voice) | TV film |
| 1996 | She Woke Up Pregnant | Doris Cantore | TV film |
| 1996–97 | The Real Adventures of Jonny Quest | Estella Velasquez (voice) | 2 episodes |
| 1997 | Diagnosis: Murder | Kirsten Foxx | Episode: "In Defense of Murder" |
| 1997 | Nothing Sacred | Paula | 2 episodes |
| 1997 | All My Children | Christina Vargas | 24 episodes |
| 1998 | Martial Law | Maria Hamilton | Episode: "Bad Seed" |
| 1999 | Thrill Seekers | Cortez | TV film |
| 2000 | Ready to Run | Sonja Ortiz | TV film |
| 2001 | Batman Beyond | Mrs. Diaz (voice) | Episode: "Unmasked" |
| 2003 | The Bernie Mac Show | Lydia | Episode: "Maid Man" |

== Books ==
- Saldana, Theresa (1986). Beyond Survival. Toronto: Bantam Books. ISBN 9780553051339. OCLC 13582610.
