= Carnelli =

Parlor game

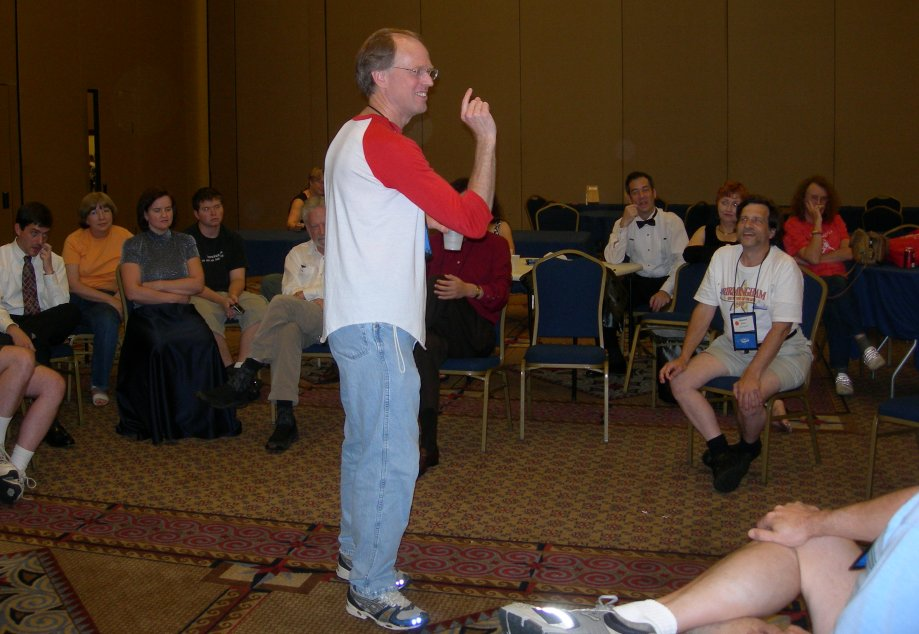
- Game of Carnelli at 2007 American Mensa Annual Gathering
- Players: 4 or more
- Setup time: A few minutes to get chairs arranged in a circle
- Playing time: 30 minutes or so per round (depending on how many players are involved)
- Chance: None
- Age range: 12 and up
- Skills: Knowledge of trivia

Carnelli is a parlor game of subsequent text continuation. It was created by Jan Carnell, a member of the Metropolitan Washington chapter of Mensa. This game has been popular at Mensa gatherings for years, and has turned up at science fiction conventions as well. It can be called a "title association" game, like "word association" only using titles, such as those of a book, play, movie, or song.

It is played by a group of people who arrange themselves in a circle, with the nonplaying judge (or "Carnelli Master") standing in the center of the circle. The Carnelli Master starts the game by pointing to one of the players and saying a title. The pointed-to player must continue the game by saying a title himself, which must connect to the previous title in some way, such as having a word in common (The Time Machine and Time Enough for Love), having a common creator (an author as with Hamlet and Macbeth or producer or director), or other linkages of a similar nature — different groups of Carnelli players can vary in exactly what kinds of links are permissible. A notable regional variation is that in some gatherings, such as Chicago Area Mensa, a common actor is usually not an acceptable linkage; a link must be by the creator of the work, setting this game apart from many other association games and making it more challenging. A common rule is to allow pun linkages as long as they draw sufficient groans from the other people present — the link from Tequila Sunrise to To Kill a Mockingbird (pronounced "Tequila Mockingbird" for effect) is a popular one. The links The Night of the Iguana to "Iguana Hold Your Hand" and The Trojan Women to Condominium have also been done. A player followed "Jonathan Livingston Seagull" with "The Turn of the Screw," and it took several seconds of silence before other players voiced the groan that indicated that they had realized that "Turn" is a homophone of "tern," a seabird.

Play proceeds around the circle, with each player naming a title that connects to the last one said. If a player is unable to come up with any title within the allotted time (kept by the Carnelli Master; generally, the time limit reduces as the game proceeds) they are eliminated and must move outside the circle. If a player names a nonexistent or incorrect title, a title that does not legitimately connect with the preceding one, or a title that has already been used in the current game, another player may challenge it, and such challenges are ruled upon by the Carnelli Master, whose judgments are said to be "arbitrary, capricious, and final". If the challenge is upheld, the challenged player is eliminated, but if the challenge is rejected, the challenger is instead eliminated. The winner is the last player remaining after all other players have been eliminated.

There is no strict one-to-one relationship between titles and works — What a Girl Wants is, unrelatedly, a Christina Aguilera song and an Amanda Bynes movie, while the first Harry Potter book is known both as Harry Potter and the Philosopher's Stone and Harry Potter and the Sorcerer's Stone. Since it is titles that are not allowed to be repeated in the course of a game rather than works, players may only say "What a Girl Wants" once, but may use both Potter titles separately—unless, of course, the current Carnelli Master decides otherwise.
