= The Minister's Cat =

Victorian parlour game

The Minister's Cat is a Victorian parlour game. The game involves describing the eponymous cat using adjectives beginning with each letter of the alphabet.

== Gameplay ==
There are different variations of this game.

In the basic game, all players sit in a circle, and the first player describes the minister's cat with an adjective beginning with the letter 'A' (for example, "The minister's cat is an admirable cat"). Each player then does the same, using different adjectives starting with the same letter. Once everyone has done so, the first player describes the cat with an adjective beginning with the letter 'B'. This continues for each letter of the alphabet.

- In an alternative variation, the first player describes the minister's cat with an adjective beginning with the letter 'A', the second with the letter 'B' and so forth, going around the circle.
- In a further variation, each player must remember the adjectives which have gone before, adding their own adjective beginning with the next letter of the alphabet. So the fifth player might say "The Minister's cat is an adorable, beautiful, cute, delightful, elegant cat."

In all variations, a player is "out" of the game if they are unable to think of an adjective, or if they repeat one previously used (or can't remember the adjectives which have gone before, in the last variant).

Players may clap in unison or speak in a rhythmic manner during the game, setting the pace for each player to speak their line; if a player falls too far behind the pace while thinking of an adjective, they may also be declared "out."

== Variations ==
On the second and succeeding rounds an alternate sentence can be used: "Mother's tea service was brittle," or, "Mother's tea service was broken."

The original version of the Minister's Cat has been adapted into an aphasia-friendly game format to support language rehabilitation and participation. The game was adapted through a co-design process by aphasia researchers at the University of Pittsburgh, speech-language pathologists, professional game designers, people with aphasia, and family/caregivers of people with aphasia.

== References in popular culture ==
- This game was played between two characters, throughout several books, in the Outlander series by Diana Gabaldon.
- An example of this game can be seen in the musical film Scrooge.
- In the episode "The Fight Before Christmas" on the sitcom Frasier, Frasier Crane eagerly announces that he intends to play a spirited game of The Minister's Cat.
- Several characters in the miniseries North and South play The Minister's Cat in Book 1.
- This game was partially played by Lois, her father, and his servants in the Family Guy episode, Absolutely Babulous.
