= Aesop's Mission =

Parlour game

Aesop's Mission is a spoken-word parlour game involving deduction. It is best played by a group where some of those present are unfamiliar with the game.

In the traditional version of the game, a player familiar with the rules takes on the role of Aesop, and secretly chooses a letter of the alphabet. Other players assume the role of a predatory animal of their choice. Aesop then asks each player in turn to name an animal that they have eaten recently; their answer must be a creature that the animal they are playing would plausibly be capable of eating. If the named animal contains the letter chosen by Aesop, he denounces them as deserving of punishment and they must perform a forfeit; otherwise they are acquitted as innocent. For example, if Aesop's chosen letter was "O", then a player acting as a lion may safely say they have eaten a sheep, but will be punished if they have eaten a fox.

The game continues "for any length of time, or until all have discovered the secret in it".

== Variants ==
In one variant of the game, the players are not animals and Aesop may ask any form of question, simply declaring all responses either "Good!" or "Bad!" according to whether they contain the secret taboo letter. Such a game can be played with each player starting the game with three lives, and losing one every time they receive a "Bad!" judgement.
