= Are you there, Moriarty? =

Parlour game

- Genres: Parlour game
- Players: 2 or more
- Setup time: Less than 5 minutes
- Playing time: Approx 1 minute per round
- Chance: High
- Age range: 5 and up
- Skills: Dexterity

Are you there, Moriarty? is a parlour game in which two players at a time participate in a duel of sorts. Each player is blindfolded and given a rolled up newspaper (or anything that comes handy and is not likely to injure) to use as a weapon. The players then lie on their fronts head to head with about three feet (one metre) of space between them – or in other versions hold outstretched hands, or stand holding hands as in a handshake. The starting player says "Are you there, Moriarty?". The other player, when ready, says "Yes". At this point the start player attempts to hit the other player with their newspaper by swinging it over their head. The other player then attempts to hit the starting player with their newspaper. The first player to be hit is eliminated from the game and another player takes their place. The objective of the game is to remain in the game as long as possible.

There is a certain element of tactics to the game. In order to avoid being hit, each player may roll to one side or the other. The decision of which direction to roll, or whether to roll at all often determines whether the player is hit by their opponent. A player who can quickly roll out of the way after speaking or striking will have a definite advantage in the game. However, like most parlour games, the appeal of this game largely lies in its spectacle and humour rather than its strategy.

== Media ==
The playing of this game is depicted in the David Nicholls novel One Day, also in the 2011 movie and the Netflix limited series of the same title, both based on the book. Are you there, Moriarty? was played as a round of the QI series N Christmas special.
