= Bill Siddons =

American music manager

Bill Siddons (born 1948) is an American music manager. He is best known for managing the Doors from 1968 to 1972.

== The Doors ==
Siddons began his career as a teenage roadie with the Doors while attending Cal State Long Beach and six months later was asked to be the manager of the band in 1968. Siddons said in response about his initial meeting with singer Jim Morrison: "So what was my first impression of Jim? He scared me to death."

When Morrison died in Paris on July 3, 1971, Pamela Courson (Morrison's girlfriend) immediately contacted Siddons. He flew to Paris and arranged the funeral and burial with Courson. However, he never saw Morrison's body due to there being a closed casket and his aversion to seeing his friend dead. “We buried Jim correctly,” says Siddons, “and that perhaps was my greatest achievement: making sure we kept it quiet until it was done the right way. Nothing to hide, but we knew what was going to happen because we'd just been through it with Jimi and Janis."

After Morrison's death, Siddons continued to manage the remaining members of the Doors as they released two albums and toured. In 1972 he parted company with the Doors. He reunited with the remaining Doors in 1978 for the release and marketing of the Jim Morrison's poetry record, An American Prayer which reawakened interest in the Doors and their musical significance. His character appears in Oliver Stone's movie The Doors, in which Josh Evans plays him.

== Post-Doors career ==
After working with the Doors, Siddons continued his career as a manager in the music industry. He managed or co-managed acts including Crosby, Stills, and Nash; Poco, America, Van Morrison, Pat Benatar, Jerry Cantrell, Robert Palmer, John Klemmer and in more recent times was a co-founder of Core Entertainment. Core Entertainment was a professional management firm representing Alice in Chains, another band which has dealt with the death of its front man, and others. Siddons co-managed Alice in Chains along with the band's original manager, Susan Silver, from 2005 to 2007. He currently runs Core Entertainment Org., and is partners with Jeremy Rosen Esq. in RoxCore Management, representing Ace of Base, Ozomatli, and Matisyahu.

== Personal life ==
Siddons married comedian Elayne Boosler in 1994.
