= Victims for Victims: The Theresa Saldana Story =

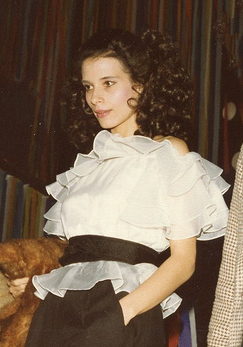
- Theresa Saldana
- Genre: Biography; Drama
- Written by: Arthur Heinemann
- Directed by: Karen Arthur
- Starring: Theresa Saldana; Lawrence Pressman; Adrian Zmed; Lelia Goldoni; Mariclare Costello; Estelle Getty
- Theme music composer: Paul Chihara
- Country of origin: United States
- Original language: English

Production
- Executive producers: Dan Paulson; Loehr Spivey
- Producer: Harry R. Sherman
- Cinematography: Jan Kiesser
- Editor: Millie Moore
- Running time: 100 minutes
- Production company: Orion Television

Original release
- Network: NBC
- Release: November 12, 1984

Victim for Victims: The Theresa Saldana Story is an American made-for-television biographical drama film starring Theresa Saldana playing herself about the attack she suffered in 1982 by a deranged stalker. The film brought the issue of stalking to public awareness. It aired on November 12, 1984 on NBC.

== Plot ==
In 1982, Theresa Saldana is an American actress living in West Hollywood. When her mother calls from New York City and tells Theresa that she got a call from director Martin Scorsese's assistant about a film role in Europe, her husband, Fred Feliciano (Adrian Zmed), is concerned that this will again require her to go on location, requiring another separation. In reality, the call actually came from a stalker, trying to get her address which Theresa's mother unknowingly provided.

Theresa takes precautions, but on March 15, 1982, when she leaves her apartment by herself, she is attacked and stabbed multiple times by deranged fan Arthur Richard Jackson (Philip English). Many people witness the attack but just stand back and do nothing until a deliveryman, Jeffrey Fenn (Ken Phillips), subdues Jackson. She survives the attack after emergency surgery. Afterwards, she and her husband suffer from depression and post traumatic stress disorder, even though he works as a counselor himself.

Theresa is worried about scarring. Since she can't work, she and her husband start to have financial problems. She meets with another crime victim and is distraught when she dies. Theresa then meets and thanks her rescuer, Jeff Fenn, which causes her husband to have doubts about himself and his relationship with Theresa. Theresa testifies at her attacker's preliminary hearing in a wheelchair amid a media frenzy. Theresa is traumatized when her injuries are photographed to be used as evidence. Theresa is finally able to move out of the hospital and her husband quits his job because he's not effective as a counselor as he spends so much time with Theresa. Theresa and her husband decide to separate.

Theresa learns that Jane Bladow (Mariclare Costello), a nurse at the nursing home she is staying at and whom she disliked for enforcing the home's restrictive rules, had once been the victim of an assault, but had no one to talk to about it. When Theresa later meets a school teacher, Miriam Schneider (Linda Carlson) who had also been attacked, Theresa decides to start a network of former victims to help each other psychologically recover by being able to talk and support each other. Arthur Jackson is found guilty and sentenced to 12 years. Her support group "Victims for Victims" attracts very much attention and many former crime victims join it.

== Cast ==
- Theresa Saldana as herself
- Adrian Zmed as Fred Feliciano
- Lelia Goldoni as Mrs. Saldana
- Lawrence Pressman as Dr. Stein
- Mariclare Costello as Jane Bladow
- Linda Carlson as Miriam Schneider
- Stanley Kamel as D.A. Mike Knight
- Philip English as Arthur Jackson
- Kenneth Phillips as Jeff Fenn

== Awards ==
The movie was nominated for the Outstanding Achievement in makeup Emmy Award at the 37th Primetime Emmy Awards.
