= Boulder Dash =

Boulder Dash may refer to:

- Boulder Dash (video game), a 1984 video game
- Boulder Dash (roller coaster), a wooden roller coaster

== See also ==
- Balderdash (disambiguation)
