= Spiral puzzle =

Type of word puzzle

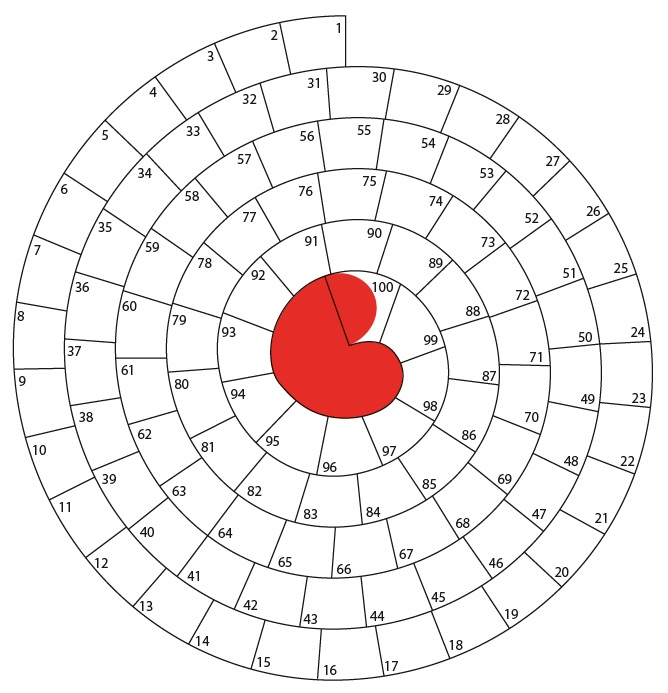
Spiral puzzle from the Friesland Post

A spiral puzzle is a word puzzle in the form of a spiral. The puzzle is formed of a long chain of letters, which spell out a list of clued words when read in either direction. The solutions to the left are entered in the boxes from 1 to 100. The responses to the right provide another set of words that must be entered from 100 to 1. The final solution can consist of a number of boxes, sometimes in colored horizontal, vertical or diagonal rows.

== Clues ==
A description such as 20-26 means that the first letter of the word must be entered in box 20 and the last letter in box 26. The requested answer in that example therefore has 7 letters. The next clue then starts in box 27 and so on to the center of the spiral.

Every square of a spiral puzzle has a single letter written into it by the solver, but the solution can be read in either direction. For example, the letters "I M P U G N I N G I S" could be given a clue for the answers "IMPUGNING" followed by "ISLE" in one direction, and "SIGNING UP" followed by "MILE" in the other.

The lack of crossing words makes spiral puzzles more difficult to solve. For more difficult types of spiral puzzles, the numbering in the spiral is missing.

== Spiral puzzles in one direction ==
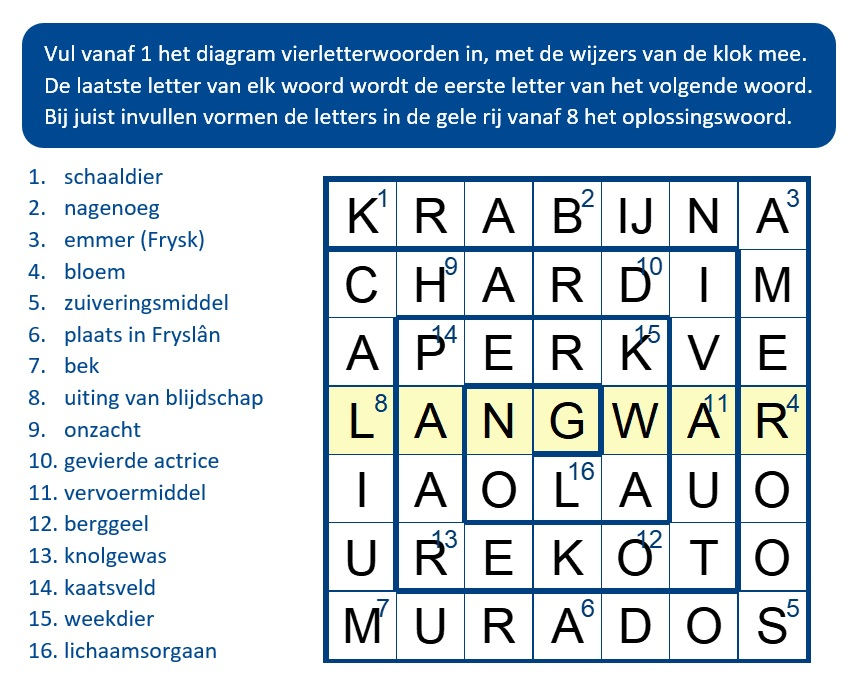
A Dutch-language spiral pad in one direction

There are also spiral puzzles where words must be entered in only one direction. The last letter of one word is also the first letter of the next word. Without overlapping letters, this puzzle is no more than a quiz with the appearance of a puzzle. For more difficult types of spiral puzzles, the numbering in the spiral is missing.

== Variants ==
- There are also Jigsaw puzzles where a spiral has to be placed with puzzle pieces.
- Three-dimensional spiral puzzles can be taken apart. The individual pieces must then be reassembled. The correct way of turning and pushing slides is related to 'spiral' in these 3D puzzles.
