= What a Girl Wants =

What a Girl Wants may refer to:

- "What a Girl Wants" (Christina Aguilera song), 1999
- What a Girl Wants (film), a 2003 film starring Amanda Bynes
- "What a Girl Wants" (B2K song), 2003
- "What a Girl Wants", a song by 4minute from For Muzik
