= Confessions of Crime =

- Presented by: Theresa Saldana
- Country of origin: United States
- Original language: English
- No. of episodes: 13

Production
- Running time: 30 minutes

Original release
- Network: Lifetime
- Release: July 23 – October 15, 1991

Confessions of Crime is an American reality series that aired on Lifetime in 1991.

== Overview ==
The series used police interrogation tapes and reenactments to reconstruct violent crimes, mostly among women. Series host Theresa Saldana was herself the victim of a stabbing by an obsessed fan in 1982.
