= Balderdash =

Board game

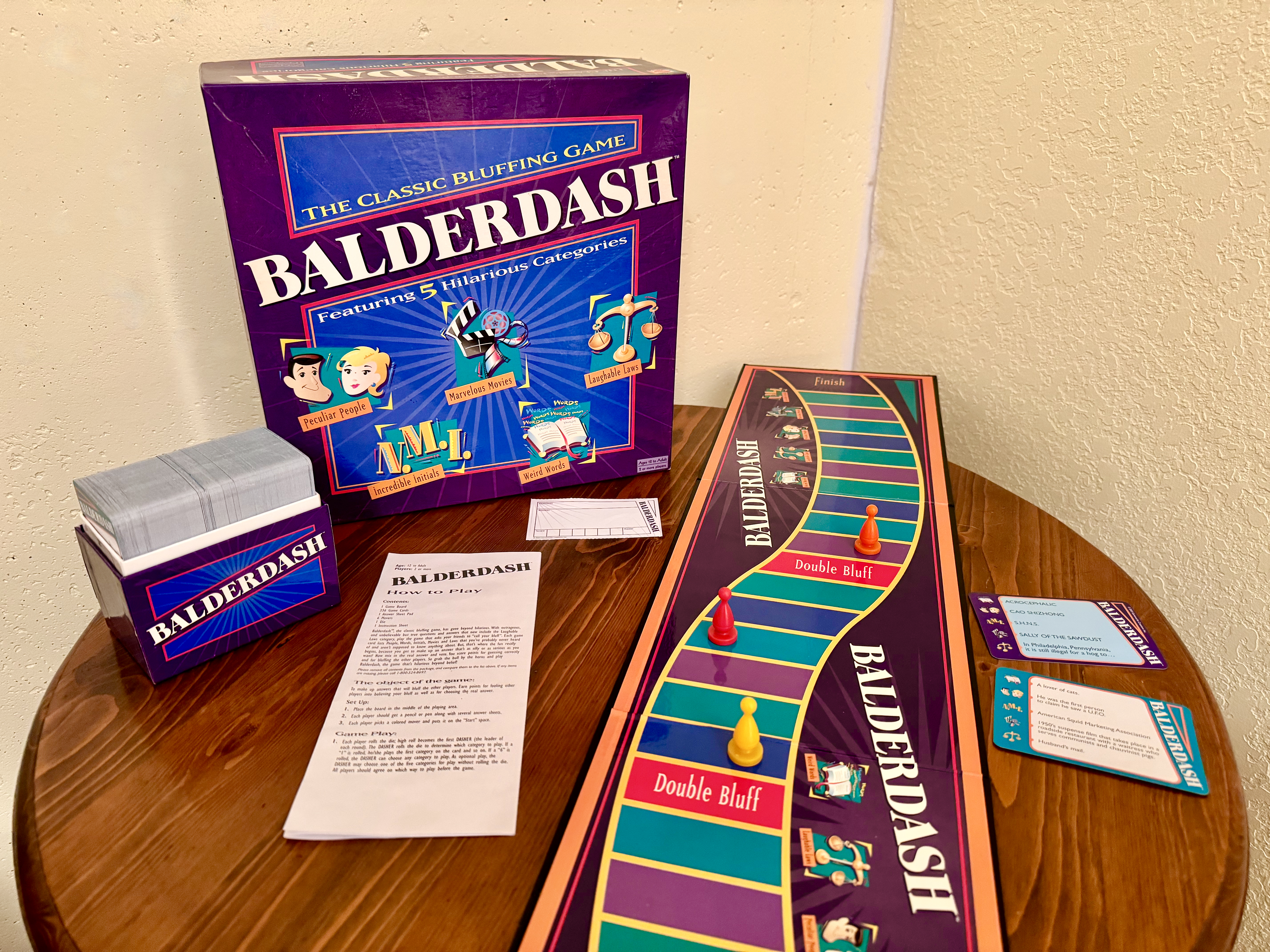
- Designers: Laura Robinson, Paul Toyne
- Illustrators: Búi Kristjánsson
- Years active: 1984–present
- Genres: Parlour game
- Players: 2–6
- Playing time: 60 minutes
- Age range: 12+

Related games
- Dixit, El Libris

Balderdash is a board game variant of a classic parlour game known as Fictionary or the Dictionary Game. It was created by Laura Robinson and Paul Toyne of Toronto, Ontario, Canada. The game was first released in 1984 by the Canada Games Company. A US edition appeared that year from TSR, Inc., copyrighted to Gameworks Creations, Inc. and licensed from Canada Games. Subsequent editions have appeared from a variety of companies including The Games Gang, Hasbro and Mattel. The game has sold over 15 million copies worldwide to date. It is aimed at fans of word games, such as Scrabble.

== Origin ==
Balderdash is based on an earlier game, Fictionary, of essentially similar gameplay, varying in that obscure words are found in an unabridged dictionary instead of the definitions and meanings provided on cards. They are then read out to the unsuspecting individual.

The board game version was created by Laura Robinson and Paul Toyne of Toronto, Ontario, Canada.

== Gameplay ==
The game presents rare and unusual words, and players secretly submit definitions for them, hoping that other players will believe their definition is the real one. It is therefore advantageous to have an excellent vocabulary and the ability to deceive.

The game begins by all players rolling a die, with the high roll chosen to be the first "dasher". The dasher draws a "definition card" from the supplied box, and rolls the dice to decide which of the words listed there is to be used. Then the dasher writes the definition of the word (as supplied on the card) on a piece of paper. All other players then write down a definition, which may be an honest attempt to supply the correct definition, or, if they do not know or for tactical reasons decide not to, a fictitious definition for the word designed to sound convincing.

The players hand their definitions to the dasher. Players submitting the correct definition are immediately awarded three points, and, if there is more than one, the round is abandoned (though the points are retained). The definitions, including the real definition, are then read out in random order. Players record which answer they believe is correct. Players are awarded two points if they guess the correct definition. Players are awarded one point for each other player who incorrectly chooses the fake definition they wrote. The dasher is awarded three points if no one guesses the correct definition. Players move their tokens around the game board one square for each point awarded. The role of dasher then passes to another player. The winner is the individual whose token reaches the end square first.

=== Variants ===
There are many different variations of ways to break ties (when two or more players hit the end at the same time). One way to resolve a tie is to say all of the players that crossed the finish line won. Another way is to have a sudden death, tie-breaker round where whoever gets more points on the tiebreaker round wins.

In 1993, Beyond Balderdash was released. In addition to more up-to-date words, Beyond Balderdash offers obscure acronyms, dates, names, and movie titles, for which the players have to provide full names, major events, major accomplishments, and plot summaries, respectively. The die is used for choosing which category will be chosen from the card. In later editions, the "Major Events" category was switched out for obscure state laws, such as "After midnight in Denver, Colorado, it is illegal to...", with players completing the law.

An informal variation of the game consists of the players exclusively submitting hilarious and outrageous definitions. No points are awarded, and the winner is determined by who garnered the most laughs throughout the course of the game.

== Television version ==
A television game show based on the game aired on Pax TV in 2004 with comedian Elayne Boosler as host.

== See also ==
- Wise and Otherwise
