= Wise and Otherwise =

Board game

Wise and Otherwise is a board game published by WiseandOtherwise.com Inc. The game includes a game board, six pawns, and a set of cards containing the beginnings and ends of obscure proverbs which are shown on opposite sides of the game cards.

== Gameplay ==
Each game can be played with two to six players. Each player take turns being the Reader. In every round, the Reader picks a card and reads the beginning of a proverb aloud. The other players write down the beginning along with a convincing ending to the proverb. The Reader copies the actual ending and collects the made-up endings. The papers are shuffled and then read aloud twice. Players vote on the one they think is the authentic proverb. Two points are awarded to each player whose proverbs were convincing, and two points are awarded to the players who voted for the authentic proverb. If nobody voted for the correct proverb, the Reader is awarded three points. The first player to reach the end of the game board wins.

The setup of Wise and Otherwise is similar to that of the board game Balderdash.

== Awards ==
Wise and Otherwise was voted Games Magazine's Party Game of the Year in 1998.
