= Tachylalia =

Extremely rapid speech

Tachylalia or tachylogia is extremely rapid speech. Tachylalia by itself is not considered a speech disorder. Tachylalia occurs in many clutterers and many people who have speech disorders.

Tachylalia is a generic term for speaking fast, and does not need to coincide with other speech problems.

Tachylalia may be exhibited as a single stream of rapid speech without prosody, and can be delivered quietly or mumbled. Tachylalia can be simulated by stimulating the brain electronically.

Tachylalia can occur with Parkinson's disease.

== See also ==
- Barbarism (linguistics) – Linguistic deviation
- Formal thought disorder
- Glossolalia – Phenomenon in which people speak words apparently in languages unknown to them
- Logorrhea – disorder causing excessive wordiness
- Schizophasia
