= Elayne Boosler =

American comedian (born 1952)

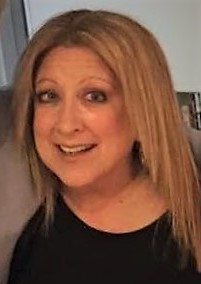
- Boosler on David Feldman's podcast in 2016
- Born: August 18, 1952 (age 74); Brooklyn, New York, U.S.
- Occupations: Comedian; writer; actress; activist; philanthropist
- Years active: 1973–present
- Spouse: Bill Siddons (m. 1994)

Elayne Boosler (born August 18, 1952) is an American comedian, writer, and actress.

She was one of the few women working in stand-up comedy in the 1970s and '80s, and she broke ground by adopting an observational style that included frank discussions about her life as a single woman, as well as political commentary. Her 1985, self-produced comedy special Party of One was the first hour-long comedy special by a female comedian to appear on a cable television network.

Comedian Richard Lewis told The New York Times in 1984: "She is the Jackie Robinson of my generation. She is the strongest female working. She broke the mold for most female comics." Rolling Stone referred to her as "The First Lady of Stand-Up" in 1988 and included Boosler in their list of the "50 Best Stand-Up Comics of All Time" in 2017. In 2018, CNN included Boosler in their list of "Groundbreaking women in American comedy" and critic Jason Zinoman of The New York Times referred to Boosler as "The Comedy Master Who Hasn't Gotten Her Due."

== Early life ==
Born into a Jewish family and raised in Sheepshead Bay, Brooklyn, Boosler was the youngest child of seven with six older brothers. Her father was a Russian acrobat who later worked in the tool and die industry. Her mother was a Romanian ballerina. Boosler took singing lessons as a child as well as dance classes with the Joffrey Ballet for several years.

Her first exposure to stand-up comedy was during her family's frequent travels to Las Vegas in her early teens. She was too young to be allowed on the gambling floor of the hotel, so she often watched the comics performing at the lounge. It was this experience that first generated her interest in stand-up comedy.

She graduated from Sheepshead Bay High School in 1969, and was enrolled at the University of South Florida, but she dropped out after two years and traveled to the Bahamas where she worked for six months as a singer and dancer in a musical revue, before returning to New York.

== Career ==
=== Stand-up comedy ===
Boosler started performing stand-up comedy at The Improv in New York City in 1973. She had been working at the club as a singing waitress, whose job was to sing between the comedic performances. On a night when one of the scheduled comedians failed to show up, Boosler took to the stage to try some comedy and spent an hour telling jokes. Afterward, Andy Kaufman suggested that she quit her singing job and try comedy instead.

Her talent for comedy was recognized early by comedians and the media alike. By 1976, comic Jimmie Walker was her manager, she was the subject of a multi-page article in New York Magazine and had appeared on Saturday Night Live with Howard Cosell and The Merv Griffin Show. She moved to Los Angeles in 1977 and was featured in a Los Angeles Times article about women in comedy. That same year she made her first appearance on The Tonight Show with Johnny Carson, with Helen Reddy sitting in as guest host. Boosler credits Totie Fields for having suggested her to Reddy.

Boosler became a regular performer at the Comedy Store, a male-dominated environment, where most female performers were relegated to a secondary stage in the upstairs corner of the club called the Belly Room. Boosler refused to perform in the Belly Room and performed instead on the club's main stage. Other comedians performing regularly at the Comedy Store that time included Freddie Prinze, Jay Leno, Richard Lewis, Richard Belzer, Jimmie Walker and Ed Bluestone.

Like her male peers, Boosler's comedy was of a more observational and frank style. Her comedic material drew upon her own life, including her experiences as a single woman, and also featured topical and political elements. Boosler also became known for her rapid-fire delivery. Her performance style set her apart from the more self-deprecating humor of female stand-up predecessors such as Joan Rivers and Phyllis Diller, whose jokes often revolved around being a wife and mother. Boosler preferred to distance herself from the "female comedian" label by declining to be interviewed for articles specifically about women in comedy and by avoiding female-centric comedy showcases.

Johnny Carson stopped inviting her to The Tonight Show after she declined to read some self-deprecating material written for her. Boosler credits David Letterman for bringing her back as a guest on the show during the episodes that he guest-hosted. Letterman would later invite Boosler several times onto Late Night with David Letterman and Late Show with David Letterman.

Boosler struggled to find funding for her first comedy special and was told that no one would watch a woman perform comedy on television. In the end she personally financed Party Of One, which was shot in 1985, and which aired on Showtime in 1986, making Boosler the first woman to have an hour-long comedy special on a cable network. After the success of Party Of One, Showtime signed-on for her subsequent specials Broadway Baby, Top Tomata and Live Nude Girls. Boosler appeared on Larry King Live the following year.

In the 1970s, Boosler performed as an opening act for musical performers such as Helen Reddy, Ben Vereen and Johnny Mathis. She performed for Queen Elizabeth II at the London Palladium as part of the Royal Variety Performance in 1989, she performed at the White House Correspondents' Dinner during President Clinton's first year in office in 1993 and in 1997 she took part in a performance for Bill Clinton and United States Congress, filmed at Ford's Theatre in Washington, D.C., and broadcast on ABC. She appeared in CNN's The History of Comedy series broadcast in 2018.

== Television work ==
Boosler starred in the 1982 NBC series The Shape of Things, alongside Dottie Archibald, Rhonda Bates, Alvernette Jimenez, Maureen Murphy and David Ruprecht, and also appeared on The Andy Kaufman Show, a talk show parody created by Kaufman that aired as an episode of the PBS series Soundstage in 1984. In 1988 she co-hosted the CableACE Awards show (known as simply the ACE Awards at the time,) along with John Larroquette. Throughout the 1980s and 90s she played guest roles on sitcoms such as Night Court, The Cosby Show, Living Single, Dear John and Sisters. She also made regular appearances on Hollywood Squares.

She wrote, directed, and acted in two half-hour movies for Cinemax: Comedy From Here, a drama that was broadcast in 1986 as part of the channel's Cinemax Comedy Experiment series, and The Call, a 1989 comedy in which Boosler's character awakens to find herself transformed into a cockroach.

Her 1992 New Year's Eve comedy-variety special, Elayne Boosler's Midnight Hour, was a 90-minute show filmed at The Town Hall in New York City and was telecast live on Showtime. She appeared on HBO's Comic Relief for six years and was also a frequent guest on Bill Maher's Politically Incorrect. In the 1990s she created comedic vignettes for the Today show and in 2004, Boosler hosted the game show Balderdash on PAX (now Ion Television).

Boosler performed at the White House Correspondent's Dinner in 1993. It was the first time that the event was televised on C-SPAN.

She also moderated a forum sponsored by the National Organization for Women during the 2004 Democratic Party presidential primaries that was televised on C-SPAN.

== Writing ==
Boosler has written for other performers, such as her work on Rodney Dangerfield's 1986 comedy special It Ain't Easy Being Me. She also wrote comedic material for Barbra Streisand that the singer used during her banter between songs.

Boosler has written several pieces published in high-profile publications: She wrote a tribute to Andy Kaufman for Esquire in 1984. In 2003, she wrote an opinion piece about comic strips for the Los Angeles Times in reaction to statements made by comic strip artist Berkeley Breathed in an earlier LA Times article. In 2018, Boosler wrote for Time about her experience of performing for the White House Correspondents' Dinner and the reaction to Michelle Wolf's performance at the event that year, as well as a piece for CNN about trying to excuse offensive behavior by claiming it was a "joke". She has also written pieces for George, USA Today and The New York Times and was a frequent contributor to The Huffington Post between 2011 and 2017.

In 2013, she premiered Rescue – A True Story, a musical performance featuring narration that was written by Boosler and that she read aloud to music composed by Carol Worthey and performed by the Glendale Philharmonic Orchestra of Glendale, California. The performance features the story of a dog's rescue.

== Political commentary, advocacy and charity work ==
Boosler was a frequent guest during election cycles on Larry King Live, CNN and Company and after-debate round tables on CNN. She also appeared on The Joy Behar Show on the CNN Headline News network (now known as HLN.) For several years, she was the permanent guest host on The Stephanie Miller Show, a progressive radio talk show.

Boosler is a supporter of the Women's Reproductive Rights Assistance Project, an organization that raises money for women who are unable to pay for either emergency contraception or a safe and legal abortion.

Boosler began working in animal rescue in 1996, first by volunteering at Boxer Rescue of Los Angeles, eventually joining its board of directors and raised the down payment needed for them to buy a rescue kennel. In 2001, she founded her own nonprofit organization, Tails of Joy, devoted to animal rescue and advocacy.

== Personal life ==
Boosler lived with comedian and actor Robin Williams from 1977 to 1978. In the 2012 book We Killed: The Rise of Women in American Comedy, Williams said of Boosler:

It was amazing to see a woman stand-up, girl stand-up, and a beautiful one at the time – just gorgeous, sexy and yet still pretty gutsy. And her jokes were sort of veiled – it seemed kind of 'Oh gosh, oh golly' – but at the same time, her jokes were really tough. As Letterman would say, she's funny like a guy. Being tough, but yet at the same time being beautiful and sexy, and at the same time not using that as a ploy. She would be up there just performing, telling jokes. Like she talked about the right to life and two fisherman who'll throw the fish back, but they're for the death penalty. Tough stuff but said really sweetly.

Boosler was also interviewed for the 2018 HBO documentary Robin Williams: Come Inside My Mind.

Boosler lived with Andy Kaufman for three years and remained close friends with him until his death in 1984. She wrote an article for Esquire in Kaufman's memory, and dedicated her 1986 Showtime special Party of One to him.

In 1994, Boosler married Bill Siddons, a music industry executive and former manager of The Doors.

== Comedy specials ==
Year	Title	Studio	Video formats	Audio formats
1986	Party of One	Showtime/Comedy Dynamics	Broadcast / VHS (1993) / DVD, streaming (2018)	Download/streaming (2019)
1987	Broadway Baby	Showtime/Comedy Dynamics	Broadcast / VHS (1993) / DVD, streaming (2018)	Download/streaming (2018)
1989	Top Tomata	Showtime/Comedy Dynamics	Broadcast / DVD, streaming (2018)	Download/streaming (2018)
1991	Live Nude Girls	Showtime/Paramount/Comedy Dynamics	Broadcast / VHS (1997) / DVD (2018) / Streaming (2019)	Download/streaming (2019)
2018	50/50 Club	Comedy Dynamics	none, audio album only	CD/download/streaming
2018	Timeless	Brooklyn Productions/Comedy Dynamics	2xDVD boxed set	CD
