= Fictionary =

Word game

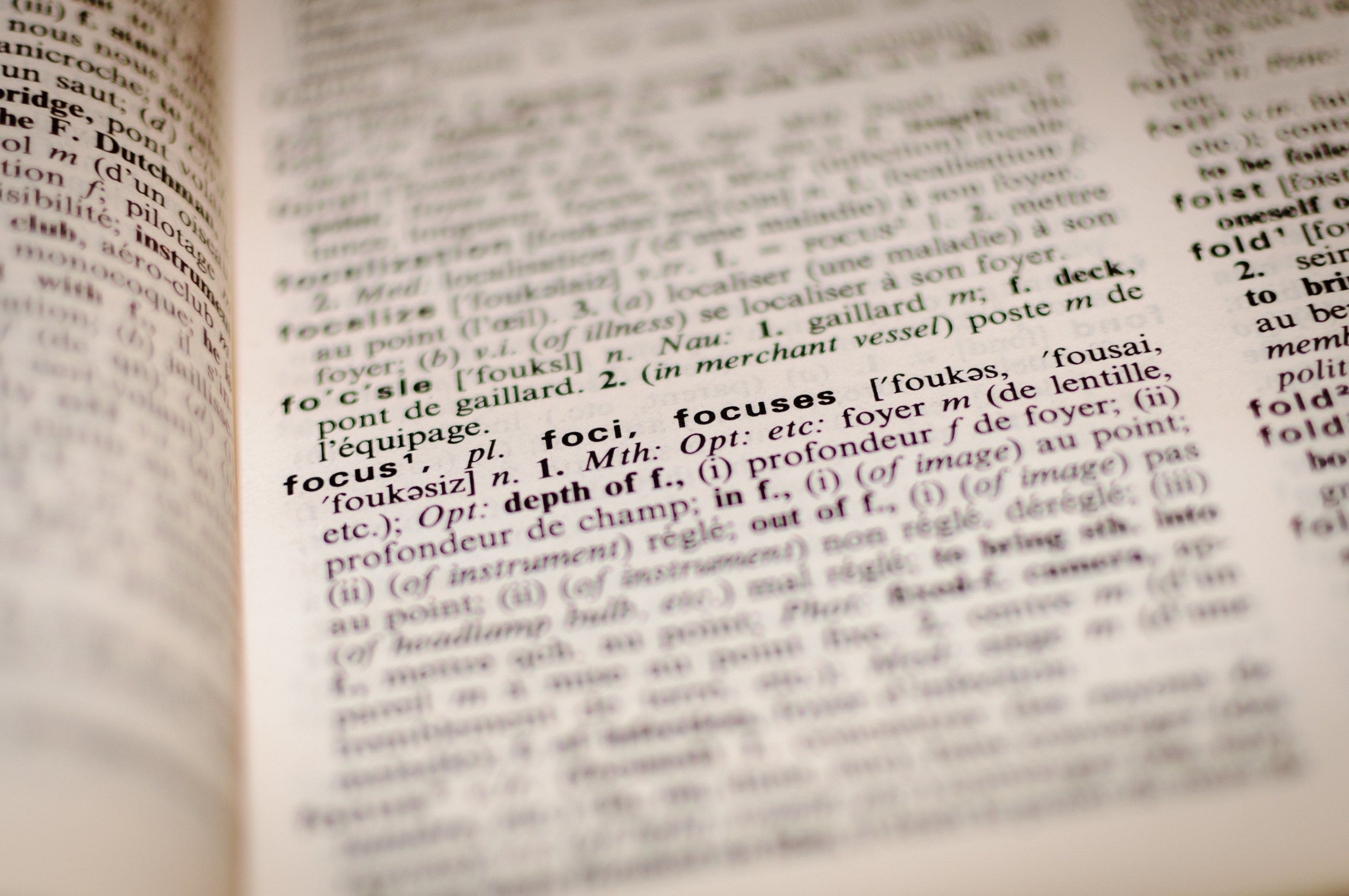
The game is played with a dictionary.

Fictionary, also known as the Dictionary Game or simply Dictionary, is a word game in which players guess the definition of an obscure word. Each round consists of one player selecting and announcing a word from the dictionary, and other players composing a fake definition for it. The definitions, as well as the correct definition, are collected blindly by the selector and read aloud, and players vote on which definition they believe to be correct. Points are awarded for correct guesses, and for having a fake definition guessed by another player.

== Gameplay ==
The game requires a large and preferably unabridged dictionary, a pencil, pen or other writing implement for each player, and notecards or identical pieces of paper for each player.

Individual house rules may vary when playing Fictionary, but play usually proceeds like this:

- One player, the "picker" for the turn, chooses an obscure word from the dictionary and announces and spells it to the other players. The chosen word should be one that the picker expects no other player to know. If a player is familiar with the chosen word, they should say so and the picker should choose a different word. If a word has more than one definition listed, the Picker privately chooses which one to use, but in such a case must specify, "X, when it does not mean so-and-so." Generally, the Picker can edit the dictionary definition as they desire.
- Each player writes a crafty and credible definition of the word, initials it, and submits it to the word picker.
- The Picker collects and shuffles the definitions, including their own, which is the correct one. As definitions are handed in, the picker should check them over to ensure that they can read the handwriting and to clarify any questions. Stumbling over or misreading a definition is usually a sign that it is not the correct one—unless the picker is trying to bluff.
- Once all definitions have been handed in, the picker reads the list aloud, once. On the second reading, each other player in turn then votes for the definition they believe is correct. Because the picker selected the word and knows the definition, the picker does not vote.
- Players earn one point for voting for the correct definition, and one point for each vote cast for the definition they wrote. (Other traditions for scoring award more points for guessing the correct definition than a player gets for picking their own.) The Picker earns three points if no one selects the correct definition. There are variations where the picker earns no points during their round as picker, fairness being achieved by ensuring that all players take equal numbers of turns as picker.
- Play then proceeds with the dictionary going to another player, which starts a new turn. A full circuit of the dictionary constitutes a round.

One variation allows a player to vote for their own definition, although they do not get points for doing so. (This can encourage other people to vote for that definition as well, and the player would get those points.) Another variation does not allow a player to vote for their own definition.

== Strategy ==
Often simple words (e.g., strunt) are more successful than complicated words with detectable Latin roots. Stock phrases such as "Any of several..." or "One or more..." sometimes lend authority to definitions. Players may decide beforehand whether lexicographic labels (e.g., obsolete, geology, dialect, etc.) are to be included. The dictionary might be passed around first, to remind players of its characteristic style.

== Variants ==
One variation uses a book of assorted poems instead of a dictionary. A rhyming quatrain is chosen by the picker. The first three lines are read and a fake fourth line must be made up by the other players which acts like the fake definitions.

Another variation asks players to write the first line of a novel using the title and the blurb read out from the back of the book as clues.

== Academic use ==
The dictionary game is sometimes suggested as a game to teach vocabulary.

== Other versions of the game ==
=== Board and party games ===
The board games Balderdash, Dictionary Dabble, Flummoxed, and Weird Wordz are based on Fictionary. In one round of the board game Derivation, players describe or fabricate a word's etymology; players who provide a correct etymology receive one point for doing so, but their entries are then removed from play, and they lose their chance to receive multiple points by drawing multiple votes from other players. Similarly, in the board game Wise and Otherwise, the Picker randomly chooses a quotation and reads the beginning, and other players try to create realistic endings to the quotation.

=== Radio and television ===
Fictionary is featured as a segment on the weekly US National Public Radio quiz show Says You!, where it is known as the bluffing round.

In the UK, Call My Bluff was a popular daytime BBC television panel game based on Fictionary, which ran from 1965 to 1988, and was revived in 1996. Two teams of three players (journalists, B and C list celebrities, etc.) compete. A player from one team has to decide between the three proposed definitions provided by the opposing team. If the first player correctly identifies the true definition of the word, they earn their team a point. If they are wrong, the team which provided the definitions are awarded the point. Call My Bluff was first aired in October 1965, with Robin Ray as chair. Presenter Robert Robinson chaired it for many years. The series finished on 18 June 2004, with a Comic Relief special in 2011.

Other television game shows based on the concept include Take My Word For It and Wordplay. In Japan, Tahoiya (たほいや) featured the game under the same name. The 30 minute late night game show aired on Fuji TV in 1993, and was rebroadcast on Fuji TV 739 satellite channel in 2008. Tahoiya, originally meaning "a cabin used for boar hunting", was one of the chosen words in early game play.

=== Electronic and online games ===
A version of the game called Dixonary has been running online since July 4, 1989, for the first fifteen years on CompuServe in its Tapcis Forum. It is believed that this game is the longest-running on-line game, and has run for more than 3,600 rounds. In May 2005, the game moved to its own website when CompuServe disconnected the forum. Since May 2007 it has been played in a Google Group, and has a support site at www.dixonary.net, which has an archive of the game that goes back, with minor gaps, to its inception in 1989.

Jackbox Games produced multiple editions of Fibbage, a game in which the players use their mobile devices to choose categories, write fake answers, and vote for the real answers. However, the questions are general trivia.

Jackbox also produced Dictionarium, with the key difference that the words are all made-up instead of picked from an unabridged dictionary. It has two additional rounds: In the second round, players make up synonyms to the winning definitions. In the final round, players use the synonyms in a sentence.

== Trademarks ==
Fictionary was a trademark of Mayfair Games Inc. until 2006. It was a trademark for equipment sold as a unit for playing the game. The game itself is not and can not be trademarked.
