= Germaine Franco =

Film composer

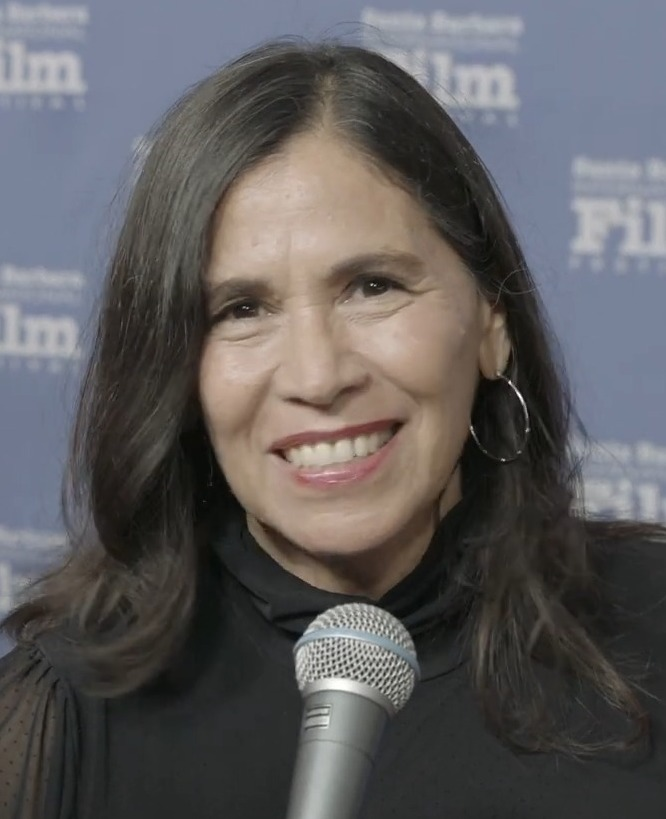
- Franco at the 2022 Santa Barbara International Film Festival

Background information
- Born: Long Beach, California, U.S.
- Genres: Film score, ambient, classical, tango, Latin
- Occupations: Composer, Songwriter, Music Producer
- Instruments: Piano, keyboards, percussion, accordion, guitar
- Years active: 2007–present
- Website: germainefranco.com

Germaine Franco is an American film composer, conductor, songwriter, arranger, record producer, and percussionist. She is a Grammy-winning and Oscar-nominated composer. Her extensive resume, coupled with her curiosity, and inventiveness, has made her a trailblazer. Franco was the first Latina to win a Grammy for Best Score Soundtrack for Visual Media with her score for Encanto (2021), and the first to receive the Annie Award for Outstanding Achievement for Music in an Animated Feature with Coco in 2018. In addition, Encanto received an Academy Award nomination for Best Original Score, an SCL Award for Outstanding Original Score for a Studio Film, an Annie Award for Best Music in a Feature, a Billboard Music Award, and a World Soundtrack Awards nomination for Film Composer of the Year in 2022. She is also the first Latina to be nominated for an Academy Award for Best Original Score, as well as the first to join the music branch of the Academy. She recently completed work on the Netflix smash hit The Mother directed by Niki Caro. The film is one of Netflix's most successful releases to date, going No.1 in 82 countries. She recently won a grammy

In 2018, Univision named Franco one of the Top 15 Latinas who are changing the world. Other film and television scores Franco has contributed to include Coco (2017), Tag (2018), Dope (2015), Vida (2018), Dora and the Lost City of Gold (2019), and Little (2019). Her work has been performed at concert halls such as the Walt Disney Concert Hall with The Los Angeles Master Chorale, The Puerto Rico Symphony, The Dallas Symphony Orchestra, The National Symphony Orchestra, and The Chicago Philharmonic, among others.

== Early life ==
Franco was born in California. She attended the Shepherd School of Music at Rice University where she studied percussion and composition, earning a bachelor's degree in 1984 and a master's in 1987. It was during this time she started writing music in addition to performing.

== Filmography ==
Year	Title	Director	Notes
2007	3 Américas	Cristina Kotz Cornejo	—N/a
2009	Entre Nos	Paola Mendoza; Gloria La Morte	
2009	A Crushing Love	Sylvia Morales	
2010	Visions of Aztlan	Jesus Salvador Treviño	
2012	Margarita	Dominique Cardona; Laurie Colbert	—N/a
2013	Living on One Dollar	Zach Ingrasci; Sean Leonard; Chris Temple	
2014	The Book of Life	Jorge Gutierrez	
2014	East LA Interchange	Betsy Kalin	composer: additional music
2015	Dope	Rick Famuyiwa	Nominated — Black Reel Award for Outstanding Original Score
2016	Shovel Buddies	Adam Townley; Simon Atkinson	—N/a
2017	Coco	Lee Unkrich	Score composed by Michael Giacchino; Additional music and Songwriter with Adrian Molina and Giacchino; Annie Award for Music in a Feature Production (Shared with Giacchino, Kristen Anderson-Lopez, Robert Lopez, and Molina)
2017	Walk with Me: On The Road With Thich Nhat Hanh	Marc Francis; Max Pugh	
2017	Coco VR Experience		
2017	Motiongate	Gary Trousdale; Steve Hickner	
2018	Tag	Jeff Tomsic	—N/a
2018	Public Disturbance	Danny Lee	—N/a
2018	Kung Fu Panda: The Emperor's Quest	Gary Trousdale; Steve Hickner	
2018	Chiefs	Zenta Fuentes	Composed with John Debney
2018	Life-Size 2	Steven K. Tsuchida	
2018	Vida	Various	
2019	Epcot Center: The Music of Coco		Music Producer, Arranger and Curator
2019	Little	Tina Gordon	—N/a
2019	Someone Great	Jennifer Kaytin Robinson	
2019	Dora and the Lost City of Gold	James Bobin	Composed with John Debney
2019	Curious George: Royal Monkey	Doug Murphy	—N/a
2019	The Casagrandes	Miguel Puga; Mike Nordstrom	Main Titles Theme Composer/Songwriter; Score Composed by Jonathan Hylander
2019	The Loud House	Michael Rubiner	Songwriter/Composer – "Greatest One Of All Time"
2020	Work It	Laura Terruso	—N/a
2020	The Sleepover	Trish Sie	—N/a
2020	Curious George: Go West, Go Wild	Michael LaBash	—N/a
2020	Kung Fu Panda Land of Awesomeness - Theme Park	Dean Orion	
2020	Yearley Departed – TV Special	Linda Mendoza	
2021	Encanto	Jared Bush; Byron Howard	Composer; Songs by Lin-Manuel Miranda; Annie Award for Music in a Feature Production; Grammy Award for Best Score Soundtrack for Visual Media; Nominated — Academy Award for Best Original Score; Nominated — Golden Globe Award for Best Original Score
2022	A Cloud Never Dies	Marc J. Francis; Max Pugh	
2023	The Mother	Niki Caro	—N/a
