= Molly DeWolf Swenson =

Entrepreneur

Molly DeWolf Swenson is an American entrepreneur, musician and Emmy-winning film producer. She is the co-founder and CEO of Mozi, alongside Ev Williams. She was also a co-founder of Los Angeles-based media company RYOT, which was acquired in 2016 by HuffPost / AOL (now Oath, Inc, a subsidiary of Verizon), a venture capitalist at LA-based technology fund 3Rodeo and a contestant on Season 10 of American Idol while she was interning at The White House under President Barack Obama.

== Early life and education ==
Swenson was born in Seattle, to a doctor mother and a dancer father. She attended Garfield High School and then Harvard University, where she graduated in 2010.

== Career ==
While interning at the White House, she auditioned for American Idol, where she was considered an early top contender. After American Idol, she was hired by Global Philanthropy Group where she worked with Shakira, Kobe Bryant, and Ben Stiller on philanthropic strategy. She met Bryn Mooser and David Darg and co-founded RYOT in 2012 in a garage in Venice. After pivoting into documentary, virtual reality and 360 video production, RYOT was acquired by HuffPost / AOL in April 2016 for around $15 million.

In 2017, Swenson was named to Forbes 30 Under 30 and a producer on the Emmy-winning, Oscar-nominated documentary short Body Team 12, now on HBO.

In November 2017, Variety reported that Swenson was leaving RYOT at the end of 2017. The publication also broke the news in March 2018 that she was tapped by Guy Oseary to join Live Nation's Maverick as its first-ever "Chief Impact Officer." In July, 2018 she worked with artist G-Eazy to launch his first nonprofit initiative, Endless Summer Fund.

DeWolf Swenson is credited with bringing the social texting app Community to Oseary in 2019 while working with him at Maverick. Community was disruptive and game-changing because for the very first time, ordinary users could chat with celebrities like Ashton Kutcher on demand.

In 2024, she and Ev Williams launched Mozi, a private social network.

== Filmography ==
Year	Title	Distributor	Format	Credit
2014	Mitimetallica		Short Documentary	Associate Producer
2014	Positive		Short Documentary	Associate Producer
2015	Gardeners of Eden	Pivot (Participant Media)	Feature Documentary	Associate Producer
2015	Body Team 12	HBO	Short Documentary	Coordinating Producer
2016	Virtually Mike and Nora	Hulu	Virtual Reality Series	Executive Producer
2016	The Big Picture: News in VR	Hulu	Virtual Reality Series	Producer
2017	Fear Us Women	Verizon go90	Short Documentary	Associate Producer
2018	Door No. 1	Hulu	Virtual Reality Series	Executive Producer
2018	On Her Shoulders	PBS	Feature Documentary	

== Music ==
Known by the stage name Molly DeWolf, she auditioned in Milwaukee in 2010 for Season 10 of American Idol, making it through Hollywood Week to the final Las Vegas round.

On December 8, 2017, she opened for Kimbra in Los Angeles and released a single from her debut album, 8 Seconds.
