= Hunger Ward =

2020 short documentary film by Skye Fitzgerald

- Directed by: Skye Fitzgerald
- Cinematography: Jeffrey Ball; Skye Fitzgerald
- Edited by: Dan Sadowsky
- Music by: William Campbell
- Production companies: Spin Films; Vulcan Productions; RYOT Films
- Distributed by: MTV Documentary Films; Paramount+; Pluto TV
- Release dates: 11 November 2020 (DOC NYC); 1 March 2021 (Pluto TV); 3 April 2021 (Paramount +)
- Running time: 40 minutes
- Country: United States
- Languages: Arabic, English

Hunger Ward is a 2020 American short documentary film directed by Skye Fitzgerald. It depicts the effects of the ongoing Yemeni famine, particularly on children. It is the third film in Fitzgerald's "refugee trilogy", which also includes 50 Feet From Syria and Lifeboat. The film received a nomination for Academy Award for Best Documentary Short Subject.

== Summary ==
Hunger Ward visits two therapeutic feeding centers in Yemen as part of its documentation of the Yemeni famine. Dr. Aida Alsadeeq and nurse Mekkia Mahdi care for malnourished children amid the Yemeni civil war.

== Production ==
After hearing about their work through mutual colleagues, Fitzgerald contacted Alsadeeq and Mahdi via WhatsApp to ask permission to film in their clinics in order to bring attention to the Yemeni famine. In an interview with Scott Simon at NPR, Fitzgerald expressed his surprise at the extent of access the documentary team was granted to film, particularly by the families of starving children. During the production, it took almost 9 months for the team to obtain visas, followed by only one month allowed in-country for filming.

While traveling through Yemen, the film crew faced checkpoints every 10 or 15 kilometers from armed militias, although due to the foresight of field producers the film crew was only detained once. Fitzgerald related that a warlord detained them even though they had the right paperwork, but through personal contacts with the Southern Transitional Council the film crew was quickly released.

During final editing of the documentary in August 2020, Fitzgerald's mother died from complications of anorexia. The film was produced by Fitzgerald and Michael Scheuerman, with executive producers including Jody Allen and Hayley Pappas; the documentary was jointly produced by Spin Films, Vulcan Productions, and RYOT Films.

Fitzgerald expressed his hope that the film would pressure the incoming Biden administration into preventing Saudi Arabia from blockading the import of food and humanitarian aid. During Joe Biden's first foreign policy address in 2021, he announced an end to official US support for the Saudi coalition in Yemen.

== Release and reception ==
Hunger Ward was nominated for the Academy Award for Best Documentary Short Subject at the 93rd Academy Awards in 2021, losing out to Colette.

The film was shown for the first time at the 2020 DOC NYC film festival. After its Oscar nomination, the film was acquired by MTV Documentary Films in February 2021 and was released to Pluto TV on 1 March 2021. The film was released to the Paramount+ streaming platform 3 April 2021, and was simultaneously shown in more than 120 theaters across the United States as part of ShortsTV's Oscar Shorts program.

In addition to its Oscar nomination, Hunger Ward was nominated for Best Documentary Short at the 2020 Critics Choice Documentary Awards, made the DOC NYC shortlist of the best short films of 2020, and won Best Director and Best Editing at the 2020 Social Impact Media Awards. Sheila Nevins, head of MTV Documentary Films, called the film "a must see for anyone with heart."
