= Jordan Wayne Long =

American filmmaker and performer (born 1982)

- Born: August 31, 1982 (age 44)
- Known for: Film

Jordan Wayne Long (born 1982) is an American filmmaker, performance artist, and co-creator of the production company HCT.Media.

== Film ==
In 2018, Long produced and co-directed a feature film titled Squirrel with Matt Glass. That same year, Long also second-unit directed Karen Gillan's feature directorial debut The Party's Just Beginning, which debuted at the Glasgow Film Festival and was eventually released by The Orchard in Late 2018.

In 2020, Long along with his business partner Matt Glass, wife Tara Perry, David Arquette, and Christina Arquette produced Brea Grant's second feature film 12 Hour Shift which was set to debut at the Tribeca Film Festival before it was cancelled due to the COVID pandemic. The film was picked up by Magnolia Pictures to be released under their Magnet Releasing arm on October 2, 2020.

Long and Matt Glass began production on their second film as directors Ghosts of the Ozarks, which Long also wrote with Perry. The film features Tim Blake Nelson, Angela Bettis, David Arquette, Thomas Hobson and Tara Perry.

The film was able to complete production even as many other productions were shut down during COVID-19.

== Documentaries ==
Half Cut Tea, a documentary web series he co-created with Matt Glass premiered online in early 2013. Its three seasons consists of 20 episodes highlighting artists from across the country.

In 2015, Long and Matt Glass started the production company HCT.media. Their clients have included The Jim Henson Company and KCET.

In 2017, Long won an Emmy Award for producing the documentary Fallujah: Art, Healing and PTSD for KCET.

== Performance Art ==
Jordan Wayne Long began his performance work in 2010 with Drag Piece while receiving his master's degree from Cranbrook Academy of Art.

Since then, he's traveled worldwide performing to London, England, New York City, The Netherlands and Arkansas.

In 2011, he received media attention for "Box Shipment #2" in which Long shipped himself across the country in a box. His only contact with the outside world was through the online multiplayer game Lord of the Rings Online. His reasoning for this project, as explained by Yahoo News was:

... to better understand post-traumatic stress disorder (PTSD). Many individuals who experience traumatic events fall victim to PTSD, a debilitating anxiety disorder that leads some to retreat to virtual worlds for comfort.

Long's Journey began in Bald Knob, Arkansas and ended in Portland, Oregon where he earned a Guinness World Record for shipping himself across the country.
