= Matt Glass =

American filmmaker and musician (born 1981)

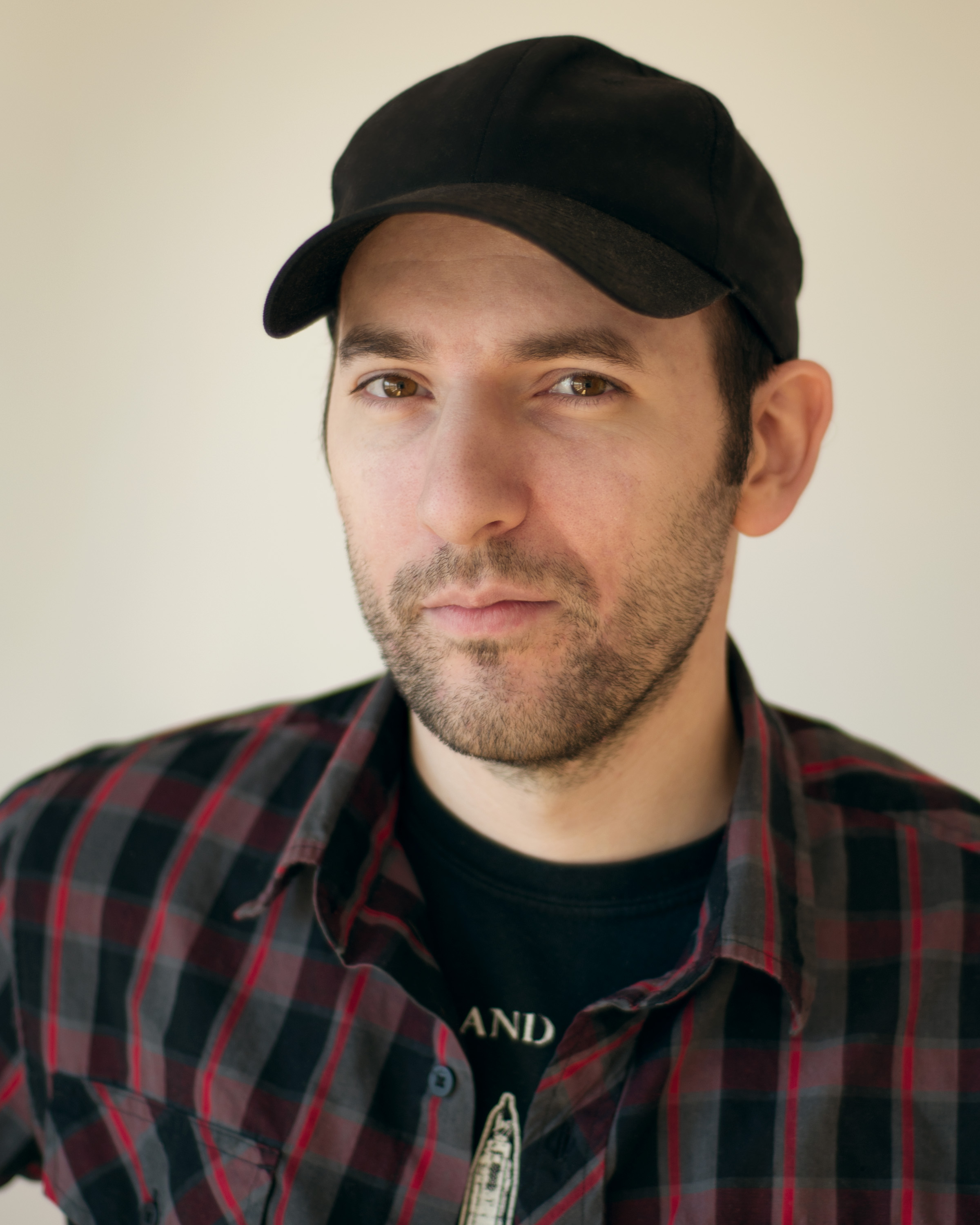
- Born: March 5, 1981 (age 45)
- Education: Weber State University Cranbrook Academy of Art
- Known for: Photography, Music, Film

Matt Glass (born March 5, 1981) is an American composer, filmmaker, musician, and photographer known for his work on 12 Hour Shift, The Party's Just Beginning and 2022's Ghosts of the Ozarks. As a musician, he often collaborates with Dallon Weekes' projects including The Brobecks and I Dont Know How but They Found Me. He also has composed music for several films such as 12 Hour Shift and You Cannot Kill David Arquette. He is also a documentarian, owning the production company HCT.media. He received his Masters of Fine Art degree from the Cranbrook Academy Of Art.

== Film ==
=== Early short films ===
Early in his career, Glass created a handful of strange short films. In 2012, Glass released Citadel, a monochromatic puppet-filled short film inspired by cerebral horror films of the 1970s. In late 2014, Glass wrote and directed Good Morning, a musical, short film featuring singing puppets and a brutal crime. In 2017, Rain, a film written and directed by Glass was released. It was an official selection in the Atlanta Film Festival and the National Puppetry Festival.

=== Feature films ===
In 2018, Glass wrote and co-directed a feature film titled Squirrel. It is described as:

A couple lost in the woods stumbles across a mysterious cult who once harvested a strange, crimson, maple syrup with healing properties. The cult is on the brink of ruin as their crimson maple supply dwindles and their leader is left with some life or death decisions to make. The couple's budding relationship is strained when they confront the truth about a series of bodies found in the woods. Their intertwining lives lead to a confluence of events all triggered by the heroic act of one soldier in the revolutionary war over 200 years ago.

That same year, Glass also second-unit directed Karen Gillan's feature directorial debut The Party's Just Beginning which debuted at the Glasgow Film Festival and was eventually released by The Orchard in Late 2018.

In 2020, Glass along with his business partner Jordan Wayne Long, Tara Perry, David Arquette, and Christina Arquette produced Brea Grant's second feature film 12 Hour Shift which was set to debut at the Tribeca Film Festival before it was cancelled due to the COVID pandemic. The film was picked up by Magnolia Pictures to be released under their Magnet Releasing arm on October 2, 2020. The film also features a score composed by Matt Glass. That same year, Glass also composed the score for the feature documentary You Cannot Kill David Arquette.

Glass and Jordan Wayne Long began production on their second film as directors Ghosts of the Ozarks. The film features Tim Blake Nelson, Angela Bettis, David Arquette, Thomas Hobson and Tara Perry which Deadline Hollywood described as:

Set in a post-Civil War Arkansas circa 1886, the film follows a young black doctor who is summoned by his uncle to a remote town in the Ozarks only to discover upon his arrival that the utopian paradise is not all that it seems to be.

With the help of strict COVID safety guidelines, the film was able to complete production even as many other productions were shut down. Ghosts of the Ozarks premiered at the 2021 Austin Film Festival and was released in select theaters and on demand in early 2022.

== Documentaries ==
Half Cut Tea, a documentary web series created by Glass and fellow Cranbrook Academy of Art graduate Jordan Long, premiered online in early 2013. Its three seasons consists of 20 episodes highlighting artists from across the country.

... a database for people to discover and become inspired by talented individuals who they were acquainted with or had heard of through friends.

In 2015, Glass and Jordan Wayne Long started the production company HCT.media. Their clients have included The Jim Henson Company, BBC, Paramount, KCET, LINK TV and more.

In 2017, Glass won an Emmy Award for his direction on the TV-series Lost LA for KCET. The hour-long documentary he co-directed with Jordan Long titled Fallujah: Art, Healing and PTSD received an Emmy Award for Best Entertainment Programming.

== Music ==
Glass was the drummer of The Brobecks from 2003 to 2005. In addition to playing drums in the band, he recorded and mixed their two first albums Understanding The Brobecks and Happiest Nuclear Winter. In 2005, he left the band to pursue his degree in Photography. Since then, he has performed with and recorded several bands including Michael Gross and The Statuettes and The Lazy Waves.

In 2010, Glass played drums, keyboards and produced a cover of the Little Shop of Horrors song "Skid Row (Downtown)" with Dallon Weekes of The Brobecks, featuring additional vocals from Brendon Urie and guitar by Ian Crawford.

He has composed music for several films and documentaries including the Emmy Winning documentary Fallujah: Art, Healing and PTSD and feature films 12 Hour Shift, You Cannot Kill David Arquette and Ghosts of the Ozarks. He has composed music for the marketing campaign of several Paramount Pictures films including Arrival and 10 Cloverfield Lane. His music has been featured on various television programs on NBC, FX and more.

=== Selected Discography ===
Source:

=== Film Composer ===
Year	Film	Notes
2026	Grind	Directed by Brea Grant, Ed Dougherty, Chelsea Stardust
2026	Frogman Returns	Directed by Anthony Cousins
2025	Where Darkness Dwells	Directed by Michael May
2022	Ghosts of the Ozarks	Directed by Matt Glass and Jordan Wayne Long
2020	12 Hour Shift	Directed by Brea Grant
2020	You Cannot Kill David Arquette	Directed by David Darg and Price James
2020	The Hoarding	Short Film. Directed by Karen Gillan
2020	Nice Ride	Short Film. Directed by Rose McIver
2018	No Trespassing: A Survey of Environmental Art	Directed by Matt Glass and Jordan Wayne Long
2017	Rain	Short film. Directed by Matt Glass
2016	Fallujah: Art, Healing and PTSD	Directed by Matt Glass and Jordan Wayne Long
2016-2018	Lost LA	TV series. Scored several segments and title song for the first three seasons
2013	Half Cut Tea	Series. Directed by Matt Glass and Jordan Wayne Long

=== Let's Become Actors ===
Year	Album
2018	One More Night
2016	Christmas Once Again
2015	Nothing Is Real
2015	At Least We're Still Living
2015	On a Silent Night
2013	Christmas Time
2007	Research Your Friends

=== The Lazy Waves ===
Year	Album
2014	Wavetable
2013	Spring Fling
2011	Summer Singles
2010	The Lazy Waves

=== Michael Gross and the Statuettes ===
Year	Album
2010	Impulse & Exports
2010	Telepath
2009	Dust & Daylight
2008	Tales From a Country Home

=== The Brobecks ===
Year	Album
2012	Quiet Title EP
2007	Small Cuts EP
2005	Happiest Nuclear Winter
2003	Understanding The Brobecks

=== I DONT KNOW HOW BUT THEY FOUND ME ===
Year	Album
2024	GLOOM DIVISION

== Photography ==
Glass' photographic style has been called "narrative and cinematic". His work ranges from comical and sarcastic to horrific and violent. Glass has been featured in several magazine and was an honorable mention in American Photo's Images Of The Year competition in 2007 and 2008.

In 2009, Glass exhibited his Apocrypha series of photographs. The visual style in this series is inspired by Baroque Art as well as modern cinematic lighting. In his artist statement, he describes the work:

Each photograph represents a different narrative, but they all take place in the same apocalyptic world. In this world, an unknown event has left humanity in ruin. The source of the violence and destruction is never seen. The human reaction to this apocalypse is the focus.

In 2010, Glass exhibited his series, The Origin of Waking. In it, he supplements his photographs with music. Each image has a corresponding song.

... listening to the music can expand on the imagery of the photograph without spelling out exactly what is happening and what it might mean ... The songs don't have specifics, just moods.
