= Salam Neighbor =

- Directed by: Chris Temple and Zach Ingrasci
- Produced by: Mohab Khattab, Salam Darwaza, Zach Ingrasci and Chris Temple
- Cinematography: Sean Kusanagi
- Edited by: Mohammed el Manasterly and Jennifer Tiexiera
- Music by: W.G. Snuffy Walden and A. Patrick Rose
- Production companies: Partnership: 1001 MEDIA and Living on One
- Distributed by: Participant Media/Pivot
- Release date: June 20, 2015 (AFI Docs Festival)
- Running time: 75 minutes
- Countries: United States; Jordan
- Languages: English, Arabic (with English subtitles)

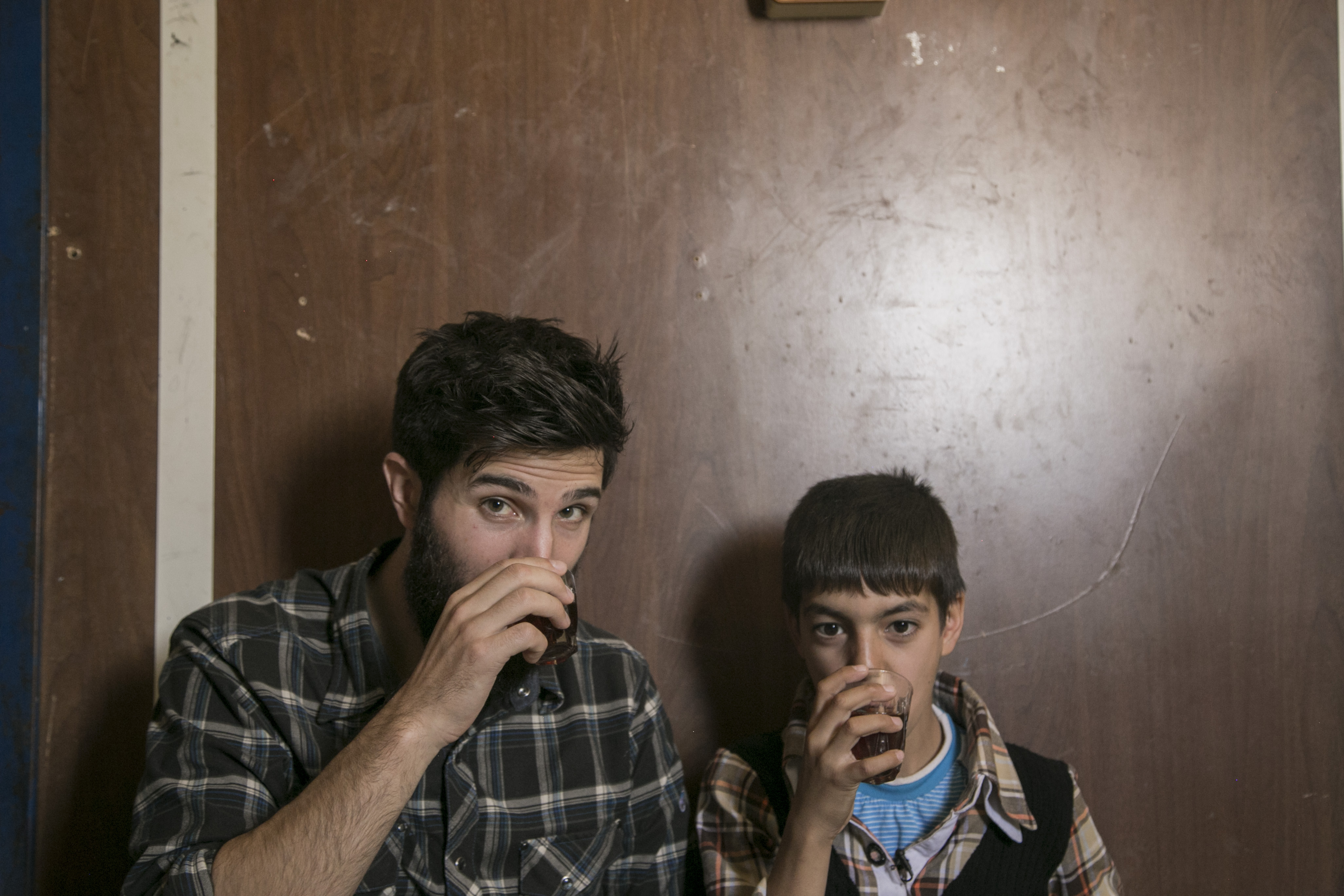
Zach Ingrasci sharing tea with Raouf, a refugee that was one of the subjects of the film.

Salam Neighbor is a 2015 documentary film by the production companies Living on One Dollar and 1001 MEDIA. The title means "hello" neighbor. The title has a dual meaning, as the Arabic word salām means "peace".

The film documents the experiences of American filmmakers Zach Ingrasci and Chris Temple when they lived among 85,000 Syrians in Jordan's Za'atari refugee camp, which lies seven miles from the Syrian border. The filmmakers, who were the first allowed by the UN to register and set-up a tent inside a refugee camp, spent a month in Za'atari to cover what the UN Refugee Agency calls the world's most pressing humanitarian crisis.

Salam Neighbor is a component of a three-part project focused on the Syrian refugee crisis: the documentary, a virtual reality (VR) film and a social impact campaign.

The film had its world premiere in Washington, DC at the AFI DOCS film festival on June 20, 2015.

== Salam Neighbor documentary ==
=== Film-making approach ===
In Salam Neighbor, the filmmakers sought to understand the human side of the Syrian refugee crisis by living among the refugees. This immersive film style, combined with a social impact campaign, reflects the strategy of Living on One, which was co-founded by Salam Neighbor's directors/producers Chris Temple and Zach Ingrasci, and echoes their previous documentary, Living on One Dollar. The "East meets West" approach to humanize the Arab world reflects the strategy of the film's other producers Mohab Khattab and Salam Darwaza, the co-founders of 1001 MEDIA.

=== Story-lines ===
Salam Neighbor concentrates on five Syrian refugees: Ghoussoon, a nurse who built a home business to provide for her children, Um Ali, a grandmother struggling to overcome personal loss and cultural barriers, Raouf, a street smart 10-year-old boy who hides his trauma behind his smile, Ghassem, a 30-something relief worker who lost everything he built in his life, and Ismail, a 20-something father finding his way after his college education was interrupted by the Syrian crisis. The film tells five stories among the 65 million refugee stories around the globe.

In trying to depict the humanity of the crisis, Salam Neighbor seeks to reflect the reality of life in a refugee camp. The film provides its audience insights into the refugee crossing process, entry into Jordan, initial aid upon arrival (water, food, first aid and inoculations), arrival registration in the camp, setting up a tent and obtaining bedding, heaters and initial food rations. In telling the stories of their neighbors, the filmmakers also offered a look into how camp life affected the refugees, both good and bad. For example, Um Ali was shown to have created opportunity out of crisis by developing and selling her art and working for an NGO to support her husband for the first time.

Salam Neighbor further addresses the logistics of running the Za'atari refugee camp, including through interviews of the then camp manager, Kilian Kleinschmidt, who discussed the entrepreneurial energy of the refugees and said, "We were building a camp, they were building a city." That quote summarizes the strains between the goals and expertise of the NGOs in providing "first-aid" and the desires of the refugees to begin to recover and rebuild their lives.

Another issue covered in the film is the role of host countries and how refugees are affected by the constraints host countries face with a large influx of people escaping war.

=== Commentary by the filmmakers ===
Members of the Salam Neighbor film team have elaborated on their approach to, as well as other aspects of, Salam Neighbor in various television and radio interviews. On Andrea Mitchell Reports on MSNBC, the directors described the story of 10-year old Raouf and the trauma he faced. On The Leonard Lopate Show on WNYC radio, the directors chatted about four major characters in the film, the filmmakers' expectations entering the refugee camp, security issues in the camp, the urban refugee issue (refugees living outside of the camps), the resettlement question and how the crisis is changing gender and cultural norms for the Syrian refugees. On The Mimi Geerges Show, the four producers covered the same issues as the Lopate interview, as well as the film's goals, the role of refugee camps, logistics in the camp, the filmmakers' interactions with refugees in the camp, the entrepreneurship exhibited in the camp, host country issues, the role of more developed Arab nations in this crisis and the Living on One/1001 MEDIA partnership.

== Reception to the documentary ==
=== Portraying life in a refugee camp ===
Both The Wall Street Journal and Fast Company noted Salam Neighbor marks the first time UNHCR has allowed filmmakers to be registered and embedded in a refugee camp with a tent. Amy Poehler’s Smart Girls said "One [film] that ... I am now a big fan of- is Salam Neighbor which ... is a poignant look at life in a refugee camp." The Refugee Sponsorship Forum added "I encourage you to see this eye-opening, candid account of life within a refugee camp."

=== Immersive approach to humanize refugees ===
The film's immersive style is meant to allow for a human depiction of the refugees. NPR said “[Chris and Zach] don't just make documentaries. They make themselves part of the story.” According to Indiewire, the audience of 'heart-wrenching' Salam Neighbor will “understand the Syrian refugee crisis like never before."

Salam Neighbor's depiction of the human elements of the Syrian refugee crisis has been recognized by political and humanitarian figures and organizations. Her Majesty Queen Rania of Jordan stated “What I love about this film is the resilience it reveals" and how it shows the Syrian refugees "have not abandoned hope.” U.S. Congressman Ted Lieu (D-CA) added that "On a subject too often discussed in terms of numbers, [Salam Neighbor] capture[s] the human element of one of the greatest refugee crises of this generation.” The International Rescue Committee stated "if this film brings greater awareness, understanding and compassion for the Syrians we work with every day, it will be, indeed, well worth our time."

=== Mobilizing change ===
The film's social impact focus regarding the crisis has been recognized. The UN Refugee Agency said “Salam Neighbor ... delivers a powerful message. It will leave you touched and inspired to take action.” Carolyn Miles, the CEO of Save the Children, added the film pushes "the boundaries of how we tell stories and maximize social impact in the 21st century." Samantha Power, U.S. Ambassador to the U.N. said “This film is important … because it shatters the idea that there isn’t anything that one can do, that the problem is too big.” Senator Chris Murphy (D-CT) added “Salam Neighbor allows all of us that glimpse into the lives of the people fleeing the violence in Syria and what’s at stake if we fail to respond.” Simon Frasier University stated "Every person who watches this film can play an active role in dispelling fear ... This is a story that encourages us not only to be global citizens, but global neighbours as well."

== Virtual reality film ==
Although Salam Neighbor mostly covers Syrian refugees in the Za'atari camp, approximately 80% of Syrian refugees in Jordan are urban refugees, living outside of the camps. In order to cover the urban refugee situation, Salam Neighbor developed the virtual reality (VR) film For My Son in partnership with RYOT and UNOCHA. The film is a video letter from an urban Syrian refugee (living in East Amman, Jordan) to his son, expressing hope for his son's future. On March 15, 2016, it launched as an exhibit at the US Holocaust Memorial Museum in Washington, DC. For My Son is also made available to audience members at some screenings of Salam Neighbor. The film can be viewed on the RYOT website and with the RYOT app (iPhones and Androids, including by use of VR headsets). It screened at the DocX section of the 2016 Hot Docs Canadian International Documentary Festival.

== Social impact campaign ==
=== What is a social impact campaign ===
Social impact campaigns seek to leverage media projects by converting public awareness of social issues and causes into engagement and action, largely by offering the audience a way to get involved. In June 2015, Variety wrote a story about how filmmakers are increasingly utilizing social impact campaigns with their films.

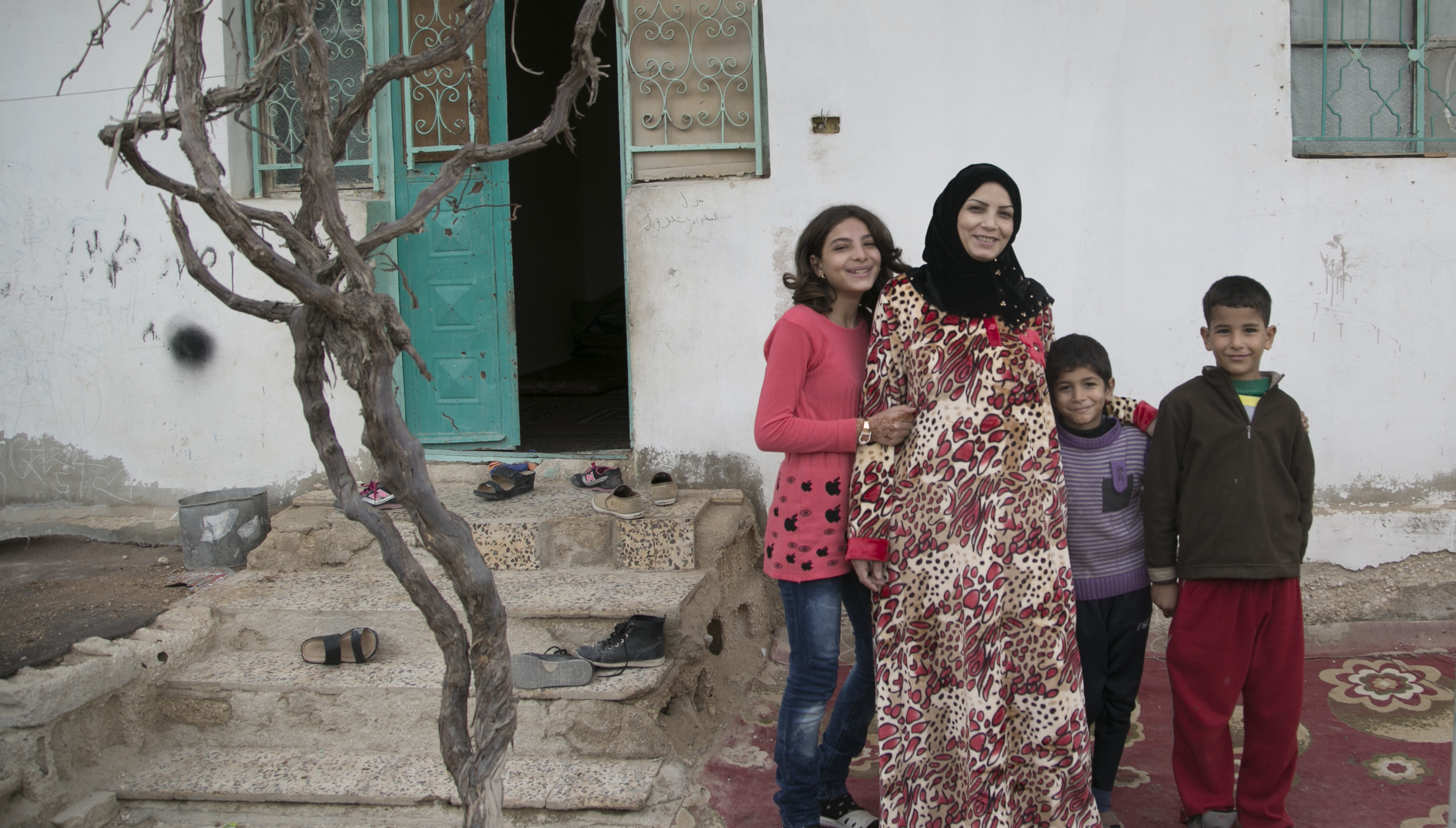
Ghoussoon is one of the five refugee subjects in Salam Neighbor. She lives outside the refugee camp and struggles to earn enough money to provide a normal life for her three children.

=== Salam Neighbor social impact campaign ===
Salam Neighbor developed a social impact campaign in conjunction with the documentary. In the Variety article, Salam Neighbor co-director/producer Zach Ingrasci was quoted as saying “If we can mobilize that shift in the narrative to have real change in policy, that can have a huge effect ... The goal is to create a more sustainable and connected response for Syrian refugees.”

The major themes of the film's impact campaign are supporting both (i) refugee host countries, and (ii) education opportunities for children whose schooling is interrupted by conflict or disaster. In May 2016, US Congressman Ted Lieu (D-CA) and Judith Rowland of Global Citizen featured Salam Neighbor in an article they published on MSNBC, entitled "Syrian refugee crisis creates huge gap in education funding." The Salam Neighbor impact campaign is in marked contrast to negative Western perceptions of Syrian refugees, which partly reflects negative stereotypes of refugees in general.

The filmmakers also work with various groups to develop guides that are used with the film to educate people about the Syrian refugee crisis. The first of those guides was released by +Acumen.

The American Film Institute (AFI) and NBCUniversal provided their first impact grant to Salam Neighbor to support this campaign. The Center for Media & Social Impact (American University, School of Communication) developed a case study on the Salam Neighbor social impact campaign, which it presented at MCON 2016 (Millennial Engagement Conference).

=== Implementation of the campaign ===
Salam Neighbor has partnered with Global Citizen, Creative Visions Foundation, Take Part and RYOT to increase awareness of issues related to the Syrian refugee crisis among policy makers and influencers (grass tops advocacy).

On March 15, 2016, Global Citizen reached out to encourage world leaders to increase educational funding for children affected by crisis using clips from Salam Neighbor. Additional clips and characters from the film were also featured in a video with actress Salma Hayek Pinault (backed by 60 leading charities and campaigners and 250,000 petitioners from around the world) promoting the Education Cannot Wait Fund that was launched at the 2016 World Humanitarian Summit in Istanbul. Various countries attending the summit pledged $90 million to the fund to help ensure displaced children like Raouf get the chance to be educated. Clips from Salam Neighbor were also included and credited in a Bono-narrated video that played immediately before President Obama spoke at the "Leaders’ Summit on the Global Refugee Crisis" he hosted on September 20, 1016 on the sidelines of the UN General Assembly meetings.

While creating awareness, Salam Neighbor also encourages grassroots advocacy for increased humanitarian funding and increased resettlement options for refugees around the world. The grassroots efforts include encouraging volunteerism in support of refugees. The US Government relies on a network of domestic organizations to make sure refugees arriving in the US have the resources they need to succeed. Salam Neighbor's website provides a link to volunteer opportunities with such resettlement organizations.

Salam Neighbor has also pursued its impact campaign on social media. A Now This video featuring Salam Neighbor has been seen by over 3.1 million people and shared over 25,000 times. The same video was featured on Upworthy and has been seen by about 968,000 people and shared over 7,000 times. Salam Neighbor also reaches out directly to its audience on social media. It live-streamed on Facebook the behind-the-scenes activities at a Georgetown University screening of the film (including a quick discussion with David Miliband, President and CEO of the International Rescue Committee) and the introductory remarks before the screening by Mr. Miliband and the featured speaker Her Majesty Queen Rania Al Abdullah of Jordan. That video has been viewed over 42,000 times.

=== Campaign partners ===
Beyond AFI and NBCUniversal, Salam Neighbor's social impact partners are the UN Refugee Agency (UNHCR), International Rescue Committee (IRC) and Save the Children. Salam Neighbor offers its audience the opportunity to donate to these partners. By the end of January 2017, over $156,000 had been raised.

== Distribution ==
=== Theatrical ===
Salam Neighbor did not utilize a normal theatrical release. Instead, the film launched with on-demand theatrical and community screenings through Tugg. The 300+ screenings included events for Her Majesty Queen Rania Al Abdullah of Jordan at Georgetown University, for UN dignitaries in New York City (opening remarks by US Ambassador to the UN Samantha Power), in the US Capitol Visitors Center in Washington, DC (opening remarks by Congressman Ted Lieu), for USAID, the US Department of State and the US Department of Homeland Security at the National Press Club in Washington, DC, for Human Rights Watch in Los Angeles, for the Aspen Institute in Washington, DC and at Google and Facebook headquarters in Silicon Valley, CA.

=== Television ===
Salam Neighbor first launched on television in the US on January 20, 2016 on Participant Media’s cable channel, Pivot. When the film premiered, the New York Times listed it on its What to Watch list. The film also started screening in the Middle East in Arabic on June 17, 2016 on Alhurra.

=== Video on Demand ===
Salam Neighbor launched on iTunes in the US and Canada on May 6, 2016. It was released on Vimeo on Demand in the US and Canada on June 10, 2016. The film premiered worldwide in 21 different languages on Netflix on June 20, 2016, which was World Refugee Day. It was also released on Amazon Video and Google Play on the same day in the US and Canada. With the World Refugee Day releases, The Atlantic Magazine listed Salam Neighbor as its "Editor's Pick." When Salam Neighbor launched in the UK on Netflix, the Guardian newspaper said the film is "an attention-grabbing, eye-level view of a crisis that many of us have spent more time discussing than imagining."

=== Other ===
Salam Neighbor was chosen for the 2016-17 American Film Showcase (AFS) for screenings sponsored by US embassies around the world as part of film festivals, special screenings and workshops. AFS is a film diplomacy program of the U.S. Department of State’s Bureau of Educational and Cultural Affairs (ECA) and is produced by the University of Southern California's School of Cinematic Arts (SCA).

== Film festivals and related events ==
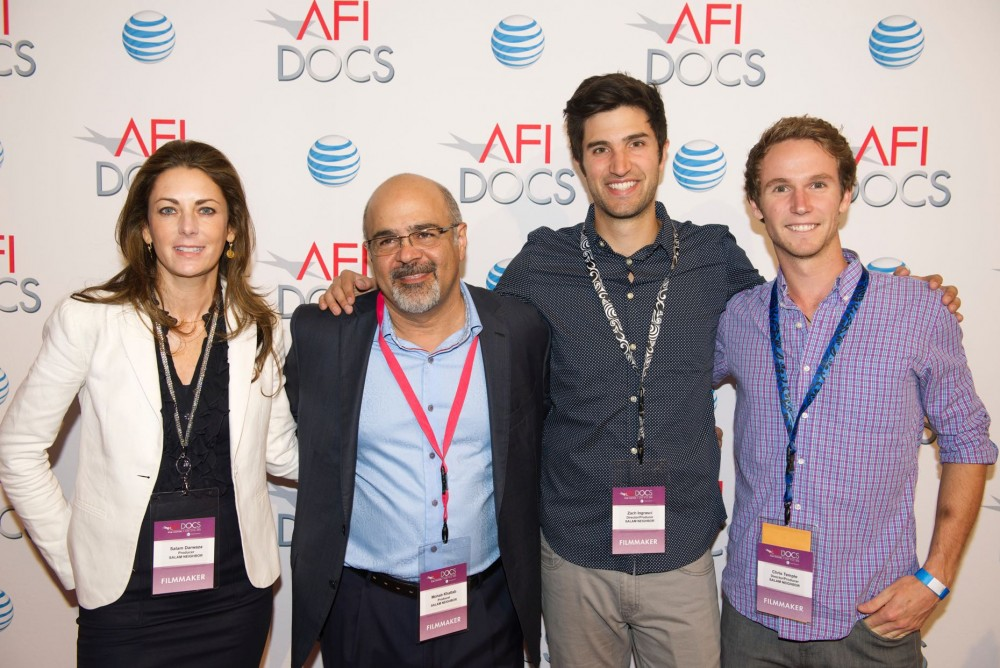
The Salam Neighbor producers at the film's premier at AFI-DOCS in 2015 (left to right, Salam Darwaza, Mohab Khattab, Zach Ingrasci and Chris Temple)

=== Traditional film festivals ===
Salam Neighbor has screened at various film festivals, including AFI-DOCS (2015, Washington, DC), where it was featured as a spotlight screening; CPH:DOX (2015, Copenhagen, Denmark), where it was ranked among the best films; Washington West (2015, Washington, DC); WatchDocs (2015, Warsaw, Poland); Aruba International Film Festival (2015); Human Rights Watch Film Festival (2016, Los Angeles, CA) and Crossroads (2016, Graz, Austria).

For My Son screened at the DocX section of the 2016 Hot Docs Canadian International Documentary Festival.

=== Related events ===
Salam Neighbor has also screened at various events surrounding major film festivals, such as SXSWedu (2016, Austin, TX) and Student Screening Day at the Palm Springs International Film Festival (2016, Palm Springs, CA).

== Awards and nominations ==
Salam Neighbor received the 2016 Media Award Honoring Voices of Courage & Conscience for a feature documentary from the US Muslim Public Affairs Council (MPAC). It was a finalist for the 2016 SIMA Awards for documentary features.
