= You Cannot Kill David Arquette =

- Official poster
- Directed by: David Darg; Price James
- Produced by: Ross Levine; Christina McLarty Arquette; Bryn Mooser; Stacey Souther
- Starring: David Arquette
- Cinematography: David Darg; Price James
- Edited by: Paul Rogers
- Music by: Dimiter Yordanov; Matt Glass; Will Patterson
- Production companies: Carbon; Kidz Gone Bad; One Last Run Productions; XTR
- Distributed by: Super LTD
- Release date: August 21, 2020
- Running time: 90 minutes
- Country: United States
- Language: English

You Cannot Kill David Arquette is a 2020 American documentary film, directed by David Darg and Price James. It follows David Arquette attempting to return to professional wrestling after his acting career stalls.

It was released on August 21, 2020, by Super LTD.

== Synopsis ==
David Arquette attempts a return to wrestling, which stalled his acting career.

== Cast ==
- David Arquette
- Patricia Arquette
- Rosanna Arquette
- Richmond Arquette
- Courteney Cox
- Ric Flair
- Mick Foley
- Eric Bischoff
- Peter Avalon
- Diamond Dallas Page

== Production ==
In December 2019, it was announced David Darg and Price James had directed a documentary film following David Arquette, over the course of two years, with Patricia Arquette, Rosanna Arquette, Richmond Arquette, Courteney Cox, and Ric Flair set to appear in the film.

== Release ==
The film was scheduled to have its world premiere at South by Southwest on March 20, 2020. The festival was cancelled due to the COVID-19 pandemic. Shortly after, Super LTD acquired distribution rights to the film. It was released to drive-in theatres on August 21, 2020, and via digital platforms and on-demand on August 28.

== Reception ==
On Rotten Tomatoes the film has an approval rating of 84%. The site's critical consensus reads, "You Cannot Kill David Arquette -- nor can you deny the sheer watchability of this unusual and surprisingly affecting documentary."

Owen Gleiberman gave a positive review for Variety and complimented how the film handles the merger between kayfabe in professional wrestling and reality: "At the end of You Cannot Kill David Arquette, we’re drawn into a wrestling narrative that the documentary wants you to believe, even as it stands on the outside looking in. Is Arquette a has-been actor trumping up his biggest failure so that he can exploit it? Or is he a lionhearted wrestler who finds triumph by going the distance? The weird thing is that there’s no difference."

For Film Pulse, Adam Patterson gave a generally positive review, but pondered if Arquette could be well received by the audience as an underdog: "This [...] may be a hard pill to swallow for some, considering he has had a seemingly successful career, lives in a beautiful home and has a family who cares for him deeply."
