= 50 Feet from Syria =

- Directed by: Skye Fitzgerald
- Production company: Spin Film
- Distributed by: The Cinema Guild
- Release date: 2015
- Running time: 39 minutes
- Countries: Turkey; United States; Syria
- Language: English

50 Feet from Syria is a 2015 short-documentary film about a Syrian-American orthopedic surgeon Hisham Bismar who travels to the Turkey-Syrian border situated Al-Amal Hospital during the Syrian civil war. Directed by Skye Fitzgerald, 50 Feet from Syria was shortlisted with ten other documentaries from 74 entries submitted to the 88th Academy Awards in the Documentary Short Subject category. The final five nominations were scheduled to be announced on January 14, 2016.

== Premise ==
50 feet from Syria follows Syrian-American surgeon Hisham Bismar as he travels to the Turkish/Syrian border to volunteer for operating on victims from the Syrian Civil War.

The film follows Hisham Bismar, a Syrian-American orthopedic surgeon, as he travels to the Turkish-Syrian border to provide medical treatment to people injured during the Syrian civil war. Bismar, who had left Syria before the conflict, returned to the region as a volunteer surgeon after becoming concerned about the shortage of specialized medical care available to wounded civilians. The film documents his work treating patients at a hospital near the border and his encounters with people affected by the conflict.

The documentary also examines the broader humanitarian consequences of the war, including the difficulties faced by civilians requiring specialized orthopedic treatment. Bismar's work is presented in the context of a medical system strained by the conflict and the movement of wounded people across the Syrian-Turkish border.

== Production ==
The film was directed by Skye Fitzgerald and produced by Spin Film. Fitzgerald followed Bismar's humanitarian work near the Syrian-Turkish border, focusing on his experiences as a physician treating civilians injured in the conflict. The documentary formed part of Fitzgerald's broader work documenting humanitarian and human-rights issues in conflict zones.

Fitzgerald later described 50 Feet from Syria as the first film in what became a series of documentaries examining humanitarian crises. It was followed by Lifeboat (2018), about efforts to rescue migrants in the Mediterranean Sea, and Hunger Ward (2020), which focuses on famine and malnutrition in Yemen.

== Release and recognition ==
50 Feet from Syria was released in 2015. It was subsequently shortlisted for the Documentary Short Subject category at the 88th Academy Awards, being selected as one of ten films from 74 eligible submissions. It was not among the five films ultimately nominated for the award.

The film received further recognition at documentary film festivals. It won the Short Documentary Award at the 2016 DOXA Documentary Film Festival.

== Reception ==
A 2016 review of the film examined its depiction of the medical consequences of the Syrian civil war and Bismar's efforts to provide orthopedic care to wounded civilians. The review noted the film's attention to the shortage of medical resources and the difficulties faced by patients requiring continued treatment after their initial operations. It also observed that the documentary gives comparatively limited background on the broader political and historical context of the Syrian conflict.
