= Clubhouse Detectives =

- Directed by: Eric Hendershot
- Screenplay by: Eric Hendershot
- Story by: Eric Hendershot
- Produced by: Dickilyn Hendershot; Eric Hendershot; Richard A. Malott; Troy Rohovit
- Starring: Michael Ballam; Michael Galeota; Jimmy Galeota; Suzanne Barnes; Christopher Ball; Thomas Hobson; Alex Miranda; Alice Harris
- Cinematography: T.C. Christensen
- Edited by: Michael Amundsen
- Music by: Alan Williams
- Distributed by: Ridgewood Associates; Silver State Productions
- Release date: 1996
- Running time: 85 minutes
- Country: United States
- Language: English

Clubhouse Detectives is a 1996 American family adventure mystery film. It was written and directed by Eric Hendershot. It follows the story of two young brothers (Billy and Kade Ruckman) who witness their next door neighbor, Michael Chambers, murder Marcela Janowitz. When they fail to convince their mother of what happened they enlist the help of their friends, Jimmy, Eddie, and J.J., in a bid to find the body and expose the truth. It was released in the United States in 1996. The film had several sequels.

== Cast ==
- Michael Ballam as Michael Chambers
- Michael Galeota as Billy Ruckman
- Jimmy Galeota as Kade Ruckman
- Suzanne Barnes as Vicky Ruckman
- Christopher Ball as Eddie Balser
- Thomas Hobson as Jimmy
- Alex Miranda as J.J. Jimenez
- Liliana Cabal as News Media (as Lillian Cabal)
- James Claffin as Harvey Lynch
- Thom Dillon as Policeman
- Alice Harris (credited Alisa Harris) as Marcela Janowitz
- Carolyn Hurlburt as Theatre Woman
- Nancy Peterson as Newscast (as Nancy Riddle)
- Alan Williams as Orchestra Conductor (uncredited)
