= Ghosts of the Ozarks =

- Directed by: Matt Glass; Jordan Wayne Long
- Produced by: Matt Glass; Jordan Wayne Long; Tara Perry; Michael May; Christina McLarty Arquette; David Arquette
- Starring: Thomas Hobson; Tara Perry; Phil Morris; Angela Bettis; Erick Rowan; Tim Blake Nelson; David Arquette
- Music by: Matt Glass
- Production companies: Devil Tub Productions; HCT Media
- Distributed by: XYZ Productions
- Release date: October 2021 (Austin)
- Running time: 106 minutes
- Country: United States
- Language: English

Ghosts of the Ozarks is a 2021 independent mystery/science fiction thriller film. It was directed by Matt Glass and Jordan Wayne Long. The film stars Thomas Hobson, Tara Perry, Phil Morris, Angela Bettis, Erick Redbeard (credited as Joseph Ruud), Tim Blake Nelson, and David Arquette.

== Synopsis ==
The story takes place in post-Civil War Arkansas, around 1866. A young Black doctor, James "Doc" McCune (Hobson), is mysteriously summoned by his uncle, Matthew McCune (Morris), to Norfork, a remote fortress town in the Ozark Mountains which appears to be a biracial utopian paradise. The nephew is to become the new town physician. However, the wooden-walled town is filled with secrets and ominous forebodings, and "Doc" McCune becomes suspicious about the true nature of the colony. His uncle Matthew appears to be in charge of the population, but the basis of his leadership is not readily apparent. Matthew instructs his nephew that everyone in the town, regardless of their job, knows their "purpose," and the uncle dissuades "Doc" from being too curious.

The forest outside Norfork's walls is populated by menacing, supernatural presences (the "ghosts"), who attack townspeople who venture outside the citadel at night; before the attacks take place, the forest is enveloped in a creeping red mist. When "Doc" McCune tracks down the previous town doctor, a woman named Annie (Perry), who lives in a house in the forest with her mute brother, William (Rowan), and asks for help in setting up his medical clinic, she is friendly but uncooperative, which heightens the young doctor's suspicions about the town. She also assures the doctor that she and her brother do not fear the "ghosts."

== Production team ==
Many of the actors in the film, as well as the directors, were involved with the producing, writing, and scoring. The story was written by Jordan Wayne Long and Tara Perry. The soundtrack was composed by Matt Glass. The film was produced by Long, Perry, Glass, Michael May, Christina McLarty Arquette, and David Arquette. Perry also sings on the closing theme, "On This Mountain (Reprise)," a song sung earlier in the film by Nelson, who plays a blind Scandinavian saloonkeeper, and his wife, Lucille (Bettis).

The film premiered at the Austin Film Festival in October 2021.
