= Meg Wittner =

American actress

- Born: Chicago, Illinois

Meg Wittner, an American actress, was born near Chicago, Illinois. Growing up with an older brother and sister, the family moved to Scarsdale, New York, when she was two. When she was 17 years old, she moved to New York City was in many commercials, including for Ivory Soap, Head & Shoulders shampoo, and Life Savers candy, and made her name known on the soap opera Somerset. She also starred on Melrose Place, 7th Heaven, Bailey Kipper's P.O.V.
