= Body Team 12 =

- Film poster
- Directed by: David Darg
- Written by: David Darg
- Produced by: David Darg; Bryn Mooser
- Cinematography: David Darg
- Edited by: David Darg
- Production companies: Vulcan Productions; RYOT
- Distributed by: HBO
- Release date: April 19, 2015 (Tribeca Film Festival)
- Running time: 13 minutes
- Country: United States
- Language: English

Body Team 12 is a 2015 short-documentary film about the Red Cross workers of Liberia, who collected dead bodies during the height of the Ebola outbreak in West Africa. The story is told by Garmai Sumo, a female worker who served as a nurse during the epidemic. It is directed by David Darg and produced by Darg and Bryn Mooser, while Olivia Wilde and Paul Allen of Vulcan Productions are executive producers.

The documentary was well received by critics and earned widespread critical acclaim. It won the Best Documentary Short award at the 2015 Tribeca Film Festival. Body Team 12 is nominated for the Documentary Short Subject category at the 88th Academy Awards.

== Synopsis ==
Garmai Sumo is the only female member of Body Team 12, a group of medical professionals who handle the bodies of the victims of Ebola in Liberia. The film focuses on Sumo's perspective of the crisis in her country.

== Reception ==
The film won a Best Documentary award at the 2015 Tribeca Film Festival. The jury explained, "The winning film is a spiritual and inspiring story of personal courage and commitment. The filmmaking team takes us on a fearless journey that restores our faith in humanity and inspires viewers to be optimistic despite facing the most extreme challenges."

== Awards ==
- 2016: Academy Awards – Best Documentary Short Subject - Nominated
- 2015: Tribeca Film Festival – Best Documentary Short
- 2017: News & Documentary Emmy Awards – Outstanding Short Documentary - Winner
