= 12 Hour Shift =

American black comedy film

- Promotional release poster
- Directed by: Brea Grant
- Written by: Brea Grant
- Produced by: Christina McLarty Arquette; David Arquette; Jordan Wayne Long; Tara Perry; Matt Glass
- Starring: Angela Bettis; Chloe Farnworth; Nikea Gamby-Turner; Kit Williamson; David Arquette
- Cinematography: Matt Glass
- Edited by: Amy McGrath
- Music by: Matt Glass
- Production company: HCT Media
- Distributed by: Magnet Releasing
- Release date: September 22, 2020 (Fantasia)
- Running time: 86 minutes
- Country: United States
- Language: English
- Box office: $6,820

12 Hour Shift is a 2020 American black comedy horror film written and directed by Brea Grant and starring Angela Bettis, Kit Williamson, and David Arquette. Bettis plays Mandy, a drug-addicted nurse involved in a black market organ-trading scheme in 1999. Arquette was one of the film's producers, alongside his wife Christina Arquette, and Jordan Wayne Long, Tara Perry, and Matt Glass. The film also features music composed by Glass.

12 Hour Shift was scheduled to have its world premiere at the Tribeca Film Festival in April 2020 prior to the festival being postponed due to the COVID-19 pandemic. Distribution rights were acquired by Magnet Releasing in June 2020, and it premiered at the Fantasia International Film Festival in September 2020. The film earned positive reviews from critics, who praised the cast—especially Bettis and Farnworth—and humor.

== Plot ==
In Arkansas in 1999, Mandy is an overworked nurse with a drug addiction. In addition to stealing patient medications, she finances her drug habit by harvesting dead patients' organs. Desk nurse Karen is Mandy's partner, and Mandy has recently brought on her cousin Regina to transport the organs to trafficker Nicholas.

One night, at the start of her 12-hour shift, Mandy hands over a harvested kidney in a cooler to Regina behind the hospital. Regina accidentally leaves the cooler with the kidney, instead carrying a cooler with a soda can to Nicholas. Nicholas demands Regina get the kidney or he will take hers. Regina cannot find the kidney at the hospital. Mandy refuses to help her, so Regina dresses like a nurse and kills one of Mandy's patients by pouring bleach down his throat. Regina expects that Mandy will be able to extract the dead patient's kidney, but Mandy angrily explains that he was on dialysis, so his kidneys are unusable.

Police arrive to investigate the murdered patient. Regina attacks more people and threatens to expose the organ trafficking operation unless Mandy helps her. Mandy agrees and tells Regina to wait outside. Regina sees one of Nicholas's henchmen, and in a panic kills a passing skateboarder to take his kidney, but ends up taking his bladder instead. Meanwhile, inside the hospital Mandy kills a patient with an overdose and manages to harvest his kidney. She leaves the kidney in another cooler by the vending machine, but it has disappeared by the time Regina gets to it.

Nicholas's henchman Mikey, who has entered the hospital and terrorized staff and patients, prepares to drag Regina away, but she desperately suggests that they kidnap a comatose patient so that Nicholas can take all his organs. The comatose patient is Mandy's abusive, drug-addicted half-brother. Mandy intervenes, and together she and Regina manage to overcome Mikey. The police investigation incorrectly determines that Mikey had been committing the murders around the hospital. Regina leaves. Hospital guest Mr. Kent suddenly announces that he has been finding the coolers containing kidneys all night; the exhausted Mandy leaves to take a nap in her truck. The film ends with Mandy re-entering the hospital to begin her next shift, followed shortly thereafter by Nicholas.

== Cast ==
- Angela Bettis as Mandy
- David Arquette as Jefferson
- Chloe Farnworth as Regina
- Mick Foley as Nicholas
- Kit Williamson as Officer Myers
- Nikea Gamby-Turner as Karen
- Tara Perry as Dorothy
- Brooke Seguin as Janet
- Dusty Warren as Mikey
- Tom DeTrinis as Mr. Kent
- Thomas Hobson as Derrick
- Julianne Dowler as Cathy
- Briana Lane as Cheryl Williams
- Sydney Steinberg as Denise Hamford
- Taylor Alden as Shawna
- Missy Stahr Threadgill as Mrs. Patrick
- Scott Dean as Efron
- Ted Ferguson as Mr. Collins
- Aaron Preusch as Andrew

== Release ==
12 Hour Shift was scheduled to have its world premiere at the Tribeca Film Festival in April 2020, but the festival was postponed due to the COVID-19 pandemic. In June 2020, it was reported that the film's worldwide distribution rights were acquired by Magnet Releasing.

== Reception ==
On review aggregator website Rotten Tomatoes, the film holds an approval rating of 77% based on 75 reviews, with an average rating of 6.6/10. The website's critics consensus reads: "Sharp, twisted, and darkly funny, 12 Hour Shift is an uncommonly clever heist caper with a refreshing female-focused twist." On Metacritic, the film has a weighted average score of 65 out of 100 based on 11 critics, indicating "generally favorable" reviews.

Hoai-Tran Bui of /Film praised Bettis's performance, and wrote that the film "has a sick sense of humor that makes its washed-out setting the perfect blank canvas for writer and director Grant to paint her gleefully bloody caper." Meagan Navarro of Bloody Disgusting also lauded Bettis's performance but criticized the film's characterization overall, concluding: "12 Hour Shift is far too ambitious for its own good, playing out like a blood-drenched yet unfocused comedy of frustrating errors."
