= 3 Américas =

2007 film by Cristina Kotz Cornejo

- Theatrical release poster
- Directed by: Cristina Kotz Cornejo
- Written by: Cristina Kotz Cornejo
- Produced by: Cristina Kotz Cornejo; Angela Counts
- Starring: Kristen Gonzalez; Ana Maria Colombo; Nicolás Meradi; Gy Mirano; Gilberto Arribas
- Cinematography: Chad Davidson
- Edited by: Cristina Kotz Cornejo
- Music by: Germaine Franco; additional: Andy Kotz
- Distributed by: Vanguard Cinema; Cinetic Rights Mgmt.
- Release date: October 11, 2007 (Woodstock Film Festival)
- Running time: 98 minutes
- Countries: Argentina; United States
- Languages: Spanish; English

3 Américas is a 2007 Argentine–American drama film written and directed by Cristina Kotz Cornejo. The film was produced by Cristina Kotz Cornejo and Angela Counts. The story takes place in Boston, Massachusetts and Buenos Aires, Argentina.

== Plot ==
With summer approaching, 16-year-old América has two issues, or so she thinks. She hates school and her aunt Carolina's alcoholic husband, Joey. She passes the days shoplifting, hanging out with her friends and trying to avoid Joey.

After a life-changing event, América, whose Spanish is limited, is sent to Buenos Aires, Argentina to live with her reclusive and anti-American grandmother, Lucía América Campos. In Argentina, América struggles to find her place with a grandmother she has never known and to hold onto a friendship with Sergio, a neighbor twice her age.

== Cast ==
- Kristen Gonzalez as América
- Ana Maria Colombo as Lucia
- Nicolás Meradi as Sergio
- Gy Mirano as Carolina
- Gilberto Arribas as Joey

== Festivals/Exhibitions ==
- The film premiered on October 11, 2007, at the Woodstock Film Festival.
- Ola Latin American Film Festival, Orlando, Florida, February 2008
- 12th Annual Harlem Stage on Screen: Creatively Speaking Film Series, March 2008
- Tiburon International Film Festival, Tiburon, CA, March 2008
- XXVI Festival Cinematográfico Internacional del Uruguay, Montevideo, April 2008
- 11th Cine Las Americas International Film Festival, April 2008
- Reel Rasquache Film Festival, California State University, Los Angeles, June 2008
- Brooklyn Academy of Music Film Screening Series, April 2008
- Museum of Fine Arts (Boston), May 2008
- New York International Latino Film Festival, July 2008
- Hartford International Film Festival, November 2008
- Yale University, January 2009

== Home media ==
3 Américas was released on DVD in the US by Vanguard International Cinema on January 26, 2010.
