= Community (celebrity texting) =

Messaging app

Community is a social marketing startup that connects fans with celebrities, through a phone number run by Community. Celebrities “leak” or share their phone number as if it's their personal cell phone. It is based in Santa Monica, California.

The cofounders are Matthew Peltier and Josh Rosenheck, who pivoted from their previous app, Shimmur, which was in a Techstars incubator in 2017. Barry Steinglass, formerly CTO of Hulu, is the CTO.

The service was launched in July 2019 with investments from Ashton Kutcher and Guy Oseary. Maverick's Chief Impact Officer Molly DeWolf Swenson brought Community to Oseary after trialing the texting platform with G-Eazy. At the time Barack Obama joined Community, on September 23, 2020, the company had amassed nearly 20 million members.

== Notable users ==
- Avril Lavigne
- Billie Eilish
- Demi Lovato
- Gayle
- Saweetie
- Tate McRae
- Olivia Rodrigo
- Sabrina Carpenter
- Barack Obama
- Misha Collins
- Jake Paul
- Marshmello
- P. Diddy
- Scooter Braun
- Paul McCartney
- Ashton Kutcher
- Karlie Kloss
- Gregg Sulkin
- Gary Vaynerchuk
- Amy Schumer
- Sophia Bush
- OneRepublic
- Jennifer Lopez
- Guapdad 4000
- Diplo (placed the phone number on a billboard in Hollywood)
- Summer Walker
- Tory Lanez
- Tom Felton
- Ellen DeGeneres
- Mark Cuban
- Kerry Washington
- Pod Save America
- Jonas Brothers
- DDG
- SuperM
- Wax Motif
- Jennifer Lopez
- Alex Rodriguez
- Ava DuVernay
- John Legend
- Jim Gaffigan
- Ian Somerhalder
- Lele Pons
- Dream (YouTuber)
- Femtanyl

== See also ==
- Katy Perry, who accidentally shared her phone number
- Escapex
- Cameo (website)
