= Bailey Kipper's P.O.V. =

- Genre: Sitcom
- Created by: Mark Waxman
- Written by: Sherry Coben; Shelly Goldstein; Robert Schwartz; Robin Stein; John Travis; Mark Waxman
- Directed by: Arthur Albert; Peter Baldwin; Mike Finney
- Starring: Michael Galeota; John Achorn; Meg Wittner; Andi Eystad; Joey Zimmerman
- Theme music composer: Andrew Logan; Pam Reswick
- Composer: Timothy Thompson
- Country of origin: United States
- Original language: English
- No. of seasons: 1
- No. of episodes: 13

Production
- Executive producer: Mark Waxman
- Producer: Jill Lopez Danton
- Cinematography: James Jansen
- Editor: Barry S. Silver
- Running time: 30 minutes
- Production companies: Kipper Productions; Victoria Productions; MTM Enterprises

Original release
- Network: CBS
- Release: September 14 – December 14, 1996

Bailey Kipper's P.O.V. is an American children's sitcom that aired on Saturday mornings on CBS from September 14 until December 14, 1996, starring Michael Galeota, John Achorn and Meg Wittner. It lasted for 13 episodes of 30 minutes length each and received airings on the BBC's CBBC programming strand as well as on Nickelodeon in the UK.

It was also the first and only Saturday morning series produced by MTM Enterprises.

== Plot ==
Bailey Kipper's young age, 11, is belied by his wit and sophistication. His father works at a local TV station and often brings home junked bits of technical equipment for his son to mess around with, for Bailey is an electronics wizard. He constructs an elaborate spy system with which, via miniature cameras (in a form of eyeballs) he has concealed all over the house and in his family's clothing (and even in the dog's collar), he can record the family's daily activity, creating a video diary of their lives, and edit the footage for comic effect with special effects. His viewing area is hidden away in a part of the house he has made inaccessible to the others. Each episode presented the results of Bailey's handiwork as he re-ran recent events in the lives of the Kipper family - mom, dad, little brother Eric and older sister Robin.

== Cast ==
- Michael Galeota as Bailey Kipper
- John Achorn as Don 'Kip' Kipper
- Meg Wittner as Vickie Kipper
- Andi Eystad as Robin Kipper
- Joey Zimmerman as Eric Kipper

== Episodes ==
No.	Title	Original release date
1	"We Have Rules"	September 14, 1996
2	"Dad Unplugged"	September 21, 1996
3	"A Singin' Fool"	September 28, 1996
4	"Mouse in the House"	October 5, 1996
5	"My First Zit"	October 12, 1996
6	"A Living Doll"	October 19, 1996
7	"The Best of the Vest"	October 26, 1996
8	"Talk Ain't Cheap"	November 2, 1996
9	"Teacher, Teacher"	November 16, 1996
10	"The Staining"	November 23, 1996
11	"Movin' Up"	November 30, 1996
12	"Drawing the Line"	December 7, 1996
13	"Trust Me"	December 14, 1996
