= The Jersey =

American TV comedy series (1999–2004)

- Genre: Comedy; Fantasy; Sports
- Based on: Characters by Gordon Korman
- Developed by: Thomas W. Lynch; Barry Gurstein; David Pitlik
- Starring: Michael Galeota; Courtnee Draper; Jermaine Williams; Theo Greenly
- Country of origin: United States
- Original language: English
- No. of seasons: 3
- No. of episodes: 64

Production
- Camera setup: Film; single-camera
- Running time: 22 minutes
- Production companies: Lynch Entertainment; Thinkfilm

Original release
- Network: Disney Channel
- Release: January 30, 1999 – March 23, 2004

The Jersey is an American comedy television series based on the Monday Night Football Club books by Gordon Korman. The series aired on Disney Channel from January 30, 1999, to March 23, 2004.

== Premise ==
Nicholas "Nick" Lighter, Morgan Hudson, Coleman Galloway, and Elliot Riffkin are four teenagers who discover the magic of "the jersey", a mystical football jersey that transports them into the bodies of professional athletes. This is done in a way that is very similar to how Sam Beckett, the main character in Quantum Leap, travels from body to body, and there is a different athlete featured in every episode. The show had several athletes as guest actors, including Dan Lyle, Michael Andretti, Terrell Davis, David Robinson, Malik Rose, Tony Gonzalez, Shannon Sharpe, Donovan McNabb, Tim Couch, Byron Dafoe, Michael Strahan, Kurt Warner, Stephon Marbury, Sergei Fedorov, Kordell Stewart, Jerome Bettis, Junior Seau, Scott Steiner, Booker T, Eddie George, Sabrina Bryan, Randy Johnson, Tony Hawk, Laila Ali, Peyton Manning, and Danny Farmer.

== Cast ==
=== Main cast ===
- Michael Galeota as Nicholas "Nick" Lighter
- Courtnee Draper as Morgan Hudson
- Jermaine Williams as Coleman Galloway
- Theo Greenly as Elliot Rifkin

=== Supporting cast ===
- Brianne Prather as Hilary Lighter
- Cheselka Leigh as Willa Conklin
- Michael Bofshever as Mr. Lighter
- McNally Sagal as Mrs. Lighter
- Meagan Good as Tamika
- Vance Yudell as Phill Parker

== Production ==
The series began production in 1998 with the filming of the pilot episode, "The Magic Jersey", which aired on Disney Channel as a mid-season special on January 30, 1999. However, its main run would not start until later that fall with the airing of "In Training", which is listed as episode 2 despite being the first episode of the show's main run. The series aired for three seasons, and while production on the show wrapped in April 2001, new episodes were shown until March 2004. The last few episodes aired early Saturday mornings on Disney Channel and after all 64 episodes were shown, The Jersey was completely taken off the air in June 2004.

== Episodes ==
Season	Episodes	Originally released	
Season	Episodes	First released	Last released
1	19	January 30, 1999	June 24, 2000
2	21	September 2, 2000	October 25, 2001
3	24	October 5, 2002	March 23, 2004

=== Season 1 (1999–2000) ===
Note: The pilot episode "The Magic Jersey" was filmed in 1998, but the rest of the season was filmed in 1999 for the 1999–2000 season.

No. overall	No. in season	Title	Directed by	Written by	Original release date	Prod. code
1	1	"The Magic Jersey"	Lev L. Spiro	Thomas W. Lynch & Barry Gustan & David Pitlik	January 30, 1999	101
In the series pilot, a kid (Michael Galeota) magically transforms into NFL stars Charles Woodson, Steve Young and Jerry Rice when he wears his grandpa's old football jersey.
2	2	"In Training"	Lev L. Spiro	Philip Vaughn	September 24, 1999	104
Nick and his friend Coleman learn about the physical makeup of different football players from the NFL's Jason Sehorn and Michael Strahan.
3	3	"Be True to You"	Alan Metter	Kathryn Baker	October 1, 1999	108
After Hilary tells Morgan that boys do not like girls who are good at sports, she is transported onto the soccer field with Cobi Jones and Clint Mathis, where she learns to be true to herself.
4	4	"Heroes"	Patrick Williams	Philip Vaughn	October 8, 1999	106
Nick (Michael Galeota) is transformed into an NFL player he does not like. The NFL's Rob Moore and Junior Seau appear as themselves.
5	5	"Ouch"	Rachel Feldman	Kathryn Baker	October 15, 1999	103
Upset that she was chosen to be an alternate in an inline-skating competition, Morgan steals the jersey to play hockey with the pros. NHL players Jeremy Roenick and Byron Dafoe appear as themselves.
6	6	"Team Player"	Paul Hoen	Norma Safford Vela	October 22, 1999	107
Baseball players Kevin Millwood, Eddie Perez, and Gary Sheffield teach Nick and Morgan the importance of teamwork after they have a squabble over a school project.
7	7	"Get Back on the Horse"	Alan Metter	Kathryn Baker	November 5, 1999	110
After Morgan quits horseback riding because she does not succeed instantly, she is transported into the body of gymnast Dominique Dawes, who teaches her the importance of practicing.
8	8	"Fathers and Sons"	Kris Tabori	Thomas W. Lynch	December 10, 1999	111
After a fight with his father, Nick is transported back in time to play football with his grandfather. The NFL's Jamal Anderson appears as himself.
9	9	"Beauty and the Beast"	Alan Metter	Hilary Friedman & Sara Jane Sluke	January 7, 2000	111
Joe Theisman has a cameo in an episode that finds Coleman being rejected by the girl he has a crush on. Also features: figure skater Michelle Kwan and the NFL's Kordell Stewart and Jerome Bettis.
10	10	"Nick's a Chick"	Kris Tabori	Kathryn Baker	January 14, 2000	102
After criticizing women's sports, Nick is transported into the shoes of the WNBA's Lisa Leslie (who plays herself). Out on the court, he learns that women play sports as well as men
11	11	"Election"	Steve Dubin	Mitchell Klebanoff	January 21, 2000	112
Nick learns that it takes hard work to get ahead as he runs for student government. The NBA's David Robinson and Malik Rose appear as themselves.
12	12	"The Prize"	Paul Hoen	Thomas W. Lynch	January 28, 2000	126
Nick learns that “teamwork is what life's about” from coach Vince Lombardi after the Jersey transports him onto the field of Super Bowl I. Meanwhile, Nick's dad gets a contract to design Super Bowl apparel.
13	13	"Speeding Bullet"	Vicki Jackson Lemay	Sib Ventress	February 11, 2000	114
Elliot is transported into the shoes of track star Michael Johnson (who appears as himself). Meanwhile, a hockey team inspires Coleman to practice his trombone.
14	14	"The Girlfriend"	Michael Ray Rhodes	Kathryn Baker	March 25, 2000	119
Coleman starts dating a girl who Nick suspects is using him to do her homework. Meanwhile, Elliott's skateboard is confiscated after he rides on a restricted sidewalk. Stunt biker Dave Mirra and skateboarder Tony Hawk appear.
15	15	"Elliot and Goliath"	Allison Liddi	Story by : Kathryn Baker; Teleplay by : Andy Yerkes	April 15, 2000	122
The NBA's Stephon Marbury helps Elliott settle the score with the bully who stole his bike. Meanwhile, Hilary and Morgan try to survive a bad-hair day.
16	16	"Take Me Out of the Ball Game"	Lev L. Spiro	Jonas Agin & Anthony Cipriano	April 29, 2000	117
When Nick neglects some of his at-home responsibilities to attend a clinic hosted by Boston Red Sox star Nomar Garciaparra, he almost ruins his dad's anniversary surprise for his mom. Elsewhere, Hilary and Willa produce a TV show.
17	17	"Mother's Day"	Kim Fields	Hilary Friedman & Sara Jane Sluke	May 13, 2000	123
Soccer player Brandi Chastain helps Morgan appreciate her biggest fan: her mom (Kathleen Bailey); Hilary starts dating a football player, which Nick finds boosts his own status at school.
18	18	"Batgirl"	Topper Carew	Nancy Neufeld Callaway	June 3, 2000	125
Morgan and Nick get into a war of words after she outperforms him at baseball tryouts. Boxer Laila Ali plays herself.
19	19	"Legacy"	Kim Fields	Thomas W. Lynch	June 24, 2000	124
Nick prepares for a track-and-field competition by using the Jersey to meet Jackie Joyner-Kersee and her husband Bob Kersee. Meanwhile, Morgan and Elliott uncover some new information about the Jersey.

=== Season 2 (2000–01) ===
No. overall	No. in season	Title	Directed by	Written by	Original release date	Prod. code
20	1	"Stealing the Stoplight"	Steve Dubin	Hilary Friedman & Sara Jane Sluke	September 2, 2000	121
Morgan learns to give credit where it is due after a misleading newspaper article pushes her into the limelight. Meanwhile, Hilary disobeys her parents and goes driving with Willa.
21	2	"Sophomore Year"	Paul Hoen	Bob Burris & Michael Ware	September 9, 2000	201
Morgan leads a one-woman battle to have the girls soccer team reinstated at school. Track star Maurice Greene appears as himself.
22	3	"Unemployed"	Paul Hoen	Thomas W. Lynch	September 16, 2000	109
Coleman (Jermaine Williams) is fired from his snack-shack job; ill cousins Morgan and Nick are reluctantly cared for by nurse Hilary. NFL quarterback Brad Johnson appears as himself.
23	4	"Breaking the Rules"	Paul Hoen	Thomas W. Lynch	September 23, 2000	202
The jersey is mistakenly taken to the cleaners, where it goes through a transformation that benefits Elliot, who's smitten with a girl on the gymnastics team. Olympic gymnast Blaine Wilson appears as himself.
24	5	"Trust Me"	Rich Wafer	Hilary Friedman & Sara Jane Sluke	September 30, 2000	120
After letting Morgan down one too many times, Elliott tries to regain her trust with help from the jersey. Meanwhile, Nick and Coleman let an obstacle-course competition get in the way of their friendship. The NFL's Marvin Harrison and Peyton Manning appear as themselves.
25	6	"Halloween"	Steve Dubin	Mitch Klebanoff	October 14, 2000	205
On a stormy Halloween night, the gang gathers at Nick and Hilary's house, where practical jokes get out of hand and inexplicable things begin to occur.
26	7	"They Say It's My Birthday"	Paul Hoen	Norma Safford Vela	October 21, 2000	105
On her birthday, Morgan anticipates a surprise visit from her brothers. Meanwhile, Nick and Elliot plan a surprise of their own. Included: appearances by the NFL's Terrell Davis, Shannon Sharpe, Tim Brown, Hardy Nickerson and Tony Siragusa.
27	8	"Bowling for Jets"	Steve Dubin	Philip Vaughn	November 3, 2000	118
Coleman has the opportunity to bowl with the New York Jets' Ray Lucas and Wayne Chrebet. Meanwhile, Nick tries to persuade his dad to allow him to go to a concert.
28	9	"Thanksgiving Day"	Rich Wafer	Thomas W. Lynch & Mitch Klebanoff	November 11, 2000	206
Nick and Morgan make a selfish decision to use the jersey on Thanksgiving Day---which could affect their very existence. The NFL's Marcus Allen and Tony Gonzalez appear as themselves.
29	10	"It's My Party"	Steve Dubin	Bob Burris & Michael Ware	November 25, 2000	203
Nick's party to impress guys on the football team is a definite winner---until they decide to play a practical joke on Coleman and Elliot. Rugby player Dan Lyle has a cameo.
30	11	"Star Tutor"	Topper Carew	Erin Bishop Rosen	December 15, 2000	208
Coleman tutors a cocky star athlete who must get his grades up in order to play for the school; Elliot tries out to be the mascot for Tamika's basketball team. Street Luger Biker Sherlock appears as himself.
31	12	"A Curfew Too Many"	Jonathan Winfrey	Susan Nirah Jaffee	December 22, 2000	207
Morgan lies to her mom so she can attend a party; and Elliot goes out for the lacrosse team. Olympic swimmer Lenny Krayzelburg appears as himself.
32	13	"Fake Me Out"	Rich Wafer	Marcy Gray Rubin & David Adam Silverman	January 5, 2001	209
Elliott schemes to buy and resell sports memorabilia, but he's conned into buying phony autographed hockey sticks. Meanwhile, Hilary and Willa go undercover for the Zine to expose cheating cheerleaders.
33	14	"Truth and Consequences"	Jonathan Winfrey	Bob Burris & Michael Ware	January 12, 2001	225
Nick tries to impress a girl by telling her the secret of the Jersey; Elliott and Coleman enter a pie-eating contest to win a BMX bike. Olympic-swimming gold medalist Dara Torres has a cameo.
34	15	"Jersey of Dreams"	Hayma "Screech" Washington	Sib Ventress	February 8, 2001	22
Coleman uses the jersey to fulfill an elderly man's former dream of playing pro ball; Hilary and Morgan get a job at the same place. The NFL's Stephen Davis and Bruce Smit appear as themselves.
35	16	"The Sadie Incident"	Steve Dubin	Jonas E. Agin & Anthony S. Cipriano	March 1, 2001	210
Coleman and Elliott's plan to get asked to the Sadie Hawkins dance by the girls they like backfires when the girl Coleman is interested in asks Elliott. Meanwhile, Hilary and Morgan clash when both join the dance's decorating committee. Professional wrestlers Scott Steiner and Booker T appear as themselves.
36	17	"Three Boys and a Nephew"	Jonathan Winfrey	Jordana Arkin	March 8, 2001	214
Nick agrees to baby-sit his coach's 8-year-old nephew in hopes of being put on first string. Race-car drivers Michael Andretti and Christian Fittipaldi appear as themselves.
37	18	"Surfing"	Paul Hoen	Bob Burris & Michael Ware	July 5, 2001	212
While doing research for a journalism assignment, Morgan learns that her favorite teacher was once arrested for auto theft. Meanwhile, Elliott tries to overcome his fear of the water by jumping into the body of surfer Kelly Slater (who appears as himself).
38	19	"Speaking of Coleman"	Patrick Williams	Bob Burris & Michael Ware	October 11, 2001	212
The jersey helps Coleman overcome stage fright by showing him first-hand what it's like to be a part of the singing group 3LW (who appear as themselves). Elsewhere, Hilary learns about baseball from Michael and Morgan.
39	20	"This Rocks"	Michael Ray Rhodes	Philip Vaughn & Kathryn Baker	October 18, 2001	TBA
Elliot finds out he's a natural when it comes rock climbing, but ends up getting stuck in a rough spot. But when Nick, facing his fear of heights, comes to save him, they both end up getting saved by teen rock climber Katie Brown. When Leonardo, Hilary's dog, will not leave the jersey alone, the jersey jumps him into a referee at a pro-football game.
40	21	"Pop Quiz"	Paul Hoen	Philip Vaughn	October 25, 2001	TBA
Nick feels that learning geometry is futile---until he learns that it's applicable to football. Meanwhile, Hilary wants to get on the yearbook staff. Quarterback Doug Flutie appears as himself.

=== Season 3 (2002–04) ===
Note: Season 3 was produced during the 2000–2001 season, but was not broadcast until 2002. Its 24 episodes aired somewhat sporadically between 2002 and 2004.

No. overall	No. in season	Title	Directed by	Written by	Original release date	Prod. code
41	1	"Bringing the Heat"	Jonathan Winfrey	Story by : Adam Lapidus & Mitch Klebanoff; Teleplay by : Mitch Klebanoff	October 5, 2002	222
When Hilary dons the jersey, she's transported into the body of Yankees pitcher David Wells, whom Morgan is supposed to interview.
42	2	"It's a Mad, Mad, Mad, Mad Jersey"	Jonathan Winfrey	Jonas E. Agin & Anthony S. Cipriano	October 6, 2002	224
Hilary is trapped in boxer Lennox Lewis's body.
43	3	"Out on a Limb"	Jonathan Winfrey	Art Everett	October 12, 2002	234
Morgan falls out of a tree. Included: appearances by the NFL's Donovan McNabb and Bobby Taylor as themselves.
44	4	"Willa Jumps"	Hank Saroyan	Peter Downing	October 19, 2002	232
Willa tries the jersey on for size after pumping a numb Hilary for information about the shirt's powers. Included are appearances by the NFL's Amani Toomer and Sam Garnes as themselves.
45	5	"Halloween 2: The Legend of Henry"	Paul Hoen	Mitch Klebanoff	October 27, 2002	231
A seance is conducted on Halloween to contact a legendary ghost named Henry, who died as a kid in 1960 while playing football. Elsewhere, Hilary and Willa refuse to get into the spirit of the October 31 holiday.
46	6	"Coleman's Big Date"	David Kendall	Kathryn Baker	November 2, 2002	233
Coleman reunites with a childhood geek-turned-teenage beauty; Nick and Hilary try to dupe their parents into spoiling them rotten.
47	7	"NFL Virus"	Garett Griffin	Paul Diamond	November 9, 2002	236
Elliott transports himself into the body of NFL player Jevon Kearse in order to combat a computer virus that threatens the Tennessee Titans; and Morgan is disappointed when a boy she likes does not ask her to the school dance.
48	8	"Playbook"	Steve Dubin	Scott Gorden	November 16, 2002	235
Nick feels responsible when his football team's playbook falls into enemy hands; Coleman and Elliott try to steal another school's mascot. The NFL's La'Roi Glover appears as himself
49	9	"Cheers, Jeers and Tears"	Hayma 'Screech' Washington	Jerry Colker	November 23, 2002	226
Hilary's crying the blues over her responsibilities as head cheerleader, while Nick and Coleman fight for the right to have their rap song added to April's radio-show playlist. Quarterback Tim Couch appears as himself.
50	10	"Alley of Dreams"	Scott McGinnis	Adam Lapidus	November 30, 2002	219
A charity bowling tournament finds Nick transported into NFL kicker John Carney's body, meanwhile Willa and Hilary discover that Mrs Kettlebrooth has a secret admirer.
51	11	"Dueling Coaches"	Dan Coffie	Mitch Klebanoff	December 7, 2002	216
Coleman and Nick coach opposing Pee Wee football teams; Larry has to foot the bill when Hilary's used car turns out to be a lemon. The NFL's Tiki Barber and Ron Dayne guest star.
52	12	"Tomorrowland"	Topper Carew	Sib Ventress	December 14, 2002	223
Morgan's transported into the future, where Kate accidentally causes baseball player Randy Johnson to sustain an injury that sidelines his pitching career.
53	13	"Jersey Switch"	Christopher Coppola	Mitch Klebanoff	December 21, 2002	229
A body switcheroo between Morgan and Hilary forces them both to experience each other's hobbies; Elliott is responsible for making the jersey even more powerful.
54	14	"The Doghouse"	Michael Grossman	Bob Burris & Michael Ware	December 28, 2002	218
Morgan resorts to trickery to keep her mom from making a big deal out of her first date with a boy, and Leo, the dog, gains Frisbee-catching skills.
55	15	"Riding the Bench"	Steve Dubin	Bob Burris & Michael Ware	January 26, 2003	217
Nick disappoints his football team by ditching a game to hit the field with NFL players Eddie George and Kevin Dyson, who appear as themselves. Meanwhile, three's a crowd when Coleman tags along on a girls' night out with Hilary and Morgan.
56	16	"Fantasy Football"	Norma Vela	David Pitlik and Barry Gurstein	January 26, 2003	228
Elliott and Coleman are overly confident about winning their fantasy-football league. Takeo Spikes and Danny Farmer of the NFL's Cincinnati Bengals guest star.
57	17	"Origins: Part 1"	Christopher Coppola	Thomas W. Lynch	April 26, 2003	237
Part 1 of 2. Morgan and Nick are transported back in time, where they meet the wizard Merlin, who created the jersey. Meanwhile, the rest of the MNFC gang match wits with a sinister government agent. Marquis Smith guest stars.
58	18	"Origins: Part 2"	Christopher Coppola	Thomas W. Lynch	May 17, 2003	238
Conclusion. Morgan and Nick are transported back in time, where they meet the wizard Merlin, who created the jersey. Meanwhile, the rest of the MNFC gang match wits with a sinister government agent. Lee Thompson Young (The Famous Jett Jackson) guest stars, along with the NFL's Warrick Dunn.
59	19	"Basketball Diaries"	Topper Carew	Bob Burris & Michael Ware	May 31, 2003	204
Superstar athletes Grant Hill and Tony Dorsett appear as themselves in this episode, in which Coleman is hesitant to compete in a father-son basketball game. Meanwhile, Hilary gives Leo a glamorous makeover.
60	20	"Owning Up"	Scott McGinnis	Mitch Klebanoff	October 11, 2003	211
When Coleman's birdhouse is poorly done, he sneaks in to school and tries to claim somebody else's birdhouse as his. Morgan detects he's hiding something, so the jersey jumps Morgan and Coleman into the middle of nowhere during a head to head motocross race.
61	21	"The New Kid in Town"	Hayma "Screech" Washington	David Pitlik and Barry Gurstein	November 1, 2003	213
Larry is a sore loser after being defeated in a game of billiards by Hilary; Elliot enters the body of BMX rider Ryan Nyquist.
62	22	"Player Faker"	Jonathan Winfrey	Jerry Colker	November 8, 2003	220
WNBA stars Cynthia Cooper and Sheryl Swoopes find themselves involved in a hoops dispute between Morgan and Tamika.
63	23	"Polar Express"	Christopher Coppola	Mitch Klebanoff	November 22, 2003	221
The Jersey offers Nick the chance to experience life in his father's shoes; Elliott and Coleman are searching for a beautiful girl to star in their film.
64	24	"What's Gotten Into Elliot Rifkin?"	Topper Carew	Bob Burris & Michael Ware	March 23, 2004	230
Skateboarder Bucky Lasek relives his high-school days while in Elliott's body; Hilary baby-sits a monkey.
