= Cristina Kotz Cornejo =

Argentine film director

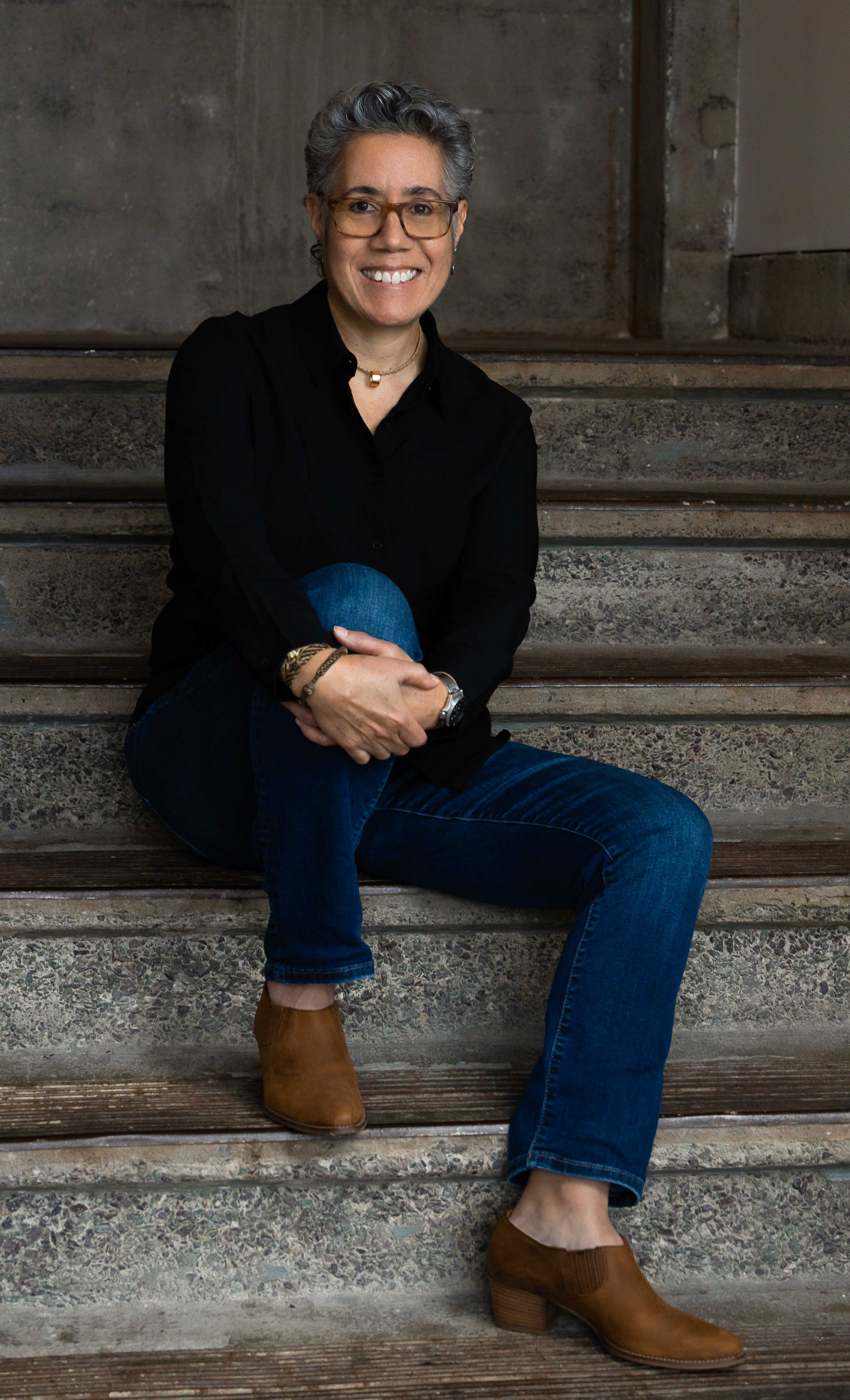
- Occupations: Screenwriter, director, producer
- Years active: 1995–present

Cristina Kotz Cornejo is an Argentine-American director and screenwriter who divides her time between Boston, Mexico City, and Buenos Aires. She is a descendant of the Huarpe people of the Cuyo region of Argentina and was educated in the US and Argentina.

== Education ==
Cristina Kotz Cornejo is a graduate of New York University's Tisch School of the Arts graduate film program and the University of Southern California's undergraduate program in international relations. She studied directing under Spike Lee, Nancy Savoca, Sara Driver and French filmmaker Pascal Aubier while at NYU Film School. She also holds a Master of Arts degree in organizational arts management from Antioch University Los Angeles.

== Career ==
In 2007 she premiered her first feature film, 3 Américas, which she wrote, directed and produced at the 2007 Woodstock Film Festival. The script was in the official script competition of the 25th Festival Internacional del Nuevo Cine Latinoamericano, Havana, under the title Soledad. The script was developed at the National Association of Latino Independent Producers' 2004 Latino Writers' Lab, the Independent Feature Project (IFP) New York Directors' Lab and participated in the 2004 Sundance Institute's Independent Producers' Conference. It also was awarded 2004 and 2007 Moving Image Fund Grants from the LEF Foundation. 3 Américas was distributed by Vanguard Cinema with digital representation by Cinetic Media's Film Buff branch.

Cristina Kotz Cornejo has made several short films including Despertar/Awaken, Hermanas, which premiered at the Morelia International Film Festival in the Mexican Short Film Competition, and Buena Fe. Her short film, The War That Never Was (La Guerra Que No Fue), was the only Argentine short to be selected by the Seattle International Film Festival in 2005 to screen in the Viva Argentina! Program. The War That Never Was has screened at over 25 festivals and venues in over 11 countries and was distributed by Ouat! Media of Toronto. Ernesto, which was commissioned by the Partnership for a Drug-Free America and premiered at the 2000 Palm Springs International Festival of Short Films, is distributed online by Cinedulce. Ocean Waves won the 2003 Award of Merit from the University Film and Video Association. Her thesis film, The Appointment, which was made under the advisement of Spike Lee while a student at NYU, was awarded the Warner Bros. Pictures Production Award, the NYU Craft Award for Musical Score by her brother Andy Kotz (who also scored Ernesto), and was picked up for distribution by Urban Entertainment after its premiere at NYU's 2000 First Run Film Festival. Jewel and the Catch, a 1993 short documentary on Jewel Thais-Williams, African American LGBTQ rights activist and owner of Jewel's Catch One Club in Los Angeles, was selected to be part of the UCLA Film Archives' Outfest Legacy Project Collection. Footage from Jewel and the Catch can be seen in the opening credit sequence of season 3 of Transparent by Joey Soloway.

Kotz Cornejo's 360-degree video, la raíz es más importante que la flor/the root is more important than the flower received Special Mention at the 2022 International Festival of Cinema and Indigenous Arts of Wallmapu in Temuco, Chile. It has been presented at 2021 Aesthetica Short Film Festival in York, England, the 2021 Asinabka Film and Media Arts Festival in Ottawa, Canada, was a finalist at the 2022 Cinequest competition and has played at the Wairoa Māori Film Festival and the Māoriland Film Festival in New Zealand. She is the recipient of the Online News Association 2020 Journalism360 Challenge Grant for a virtual reality project in development.

Kotz Cornejo became the first Latina full professor of film/media production in the US in 2014. She has taught at Emerson College in Boston since 2001. She is the recipient of the 2007-08 Mann Stearns Distinguished Faculty Award, a 2012 MacDowell Colony Fellowship, a 2013 Massachusetts Cultural Council Artist Fellowship and a 2014 Cine Qua Non Screenwriters Fellow. In 2019, she was awarded the American Spirit Award in Special Achievement in Educating New Filmmakers from the Caucus for Producers, Writers & Directors. In 2021 Variety named her a 2021 Educator of the Year.

== Filmography ==
=== Director ===
- la raíz es más important que la flor (2021) (short 360-degree video documentary)
- Buena Fé (2014) (short)
- Hermanas (2013) (short)
- Despertar/Awaken (2011) (short)
- 3 Américas (2007)
- The War That Never Was/La Guerra Que No Fue (2004) (short)
- Ocean Waves (2003) (short)
- Ernesto (2000) (short)
- The Appointment (1999) (short)
- Jewel and The Catch (1993) (documentary short)

=== Writer ===
- Buena Fé (2014) (short)
- Hermanas (2013) (short)
- Despertar/Awaken (2011) (short)
- 3 Américas (2007)
- The War That Never Was/La Guerra Que No Fue (2004) (short)
- Ernesto (2000) (short)

== Awards and honors ==
- 2020 - Journalism360 Challenge Grant
- 2019 - American Spirit Award in Educating New Filmmakers (Caucus for Producers, Writers & Directors)
- 2014 - Cine Qua Non Screenwriting Residency Fellowship
- 2013 - Massachusetts Cultural Council Artist Fellowship
- 2012 - MacDowell Colony Fellowship
- 2010 - Film Independent Project|Involve Fellowship
- 2007 - Mann Stearns Distinguished Faculty Award
- 2000 - Face of Drugs Award, Partnership for a Drug Free America

== Bibliography ==
- Contributing author: Filming Difference: Actors, Directors, Producers and Writers on Gender, Race and Sexuality in Film, University of Texas Press (edited by Daniel Bernardi), May 2009

== See also ==
- List of female film and television directors
