= Michael Galeota =

American actor (1984–2016)

- Galeota in the 1990s
- Born: Michael James Galeota; August 28, 1984; Smithtown, New York, U.S.
- Died: January 10, 2016 (aged 31); Glendale, California, U.S.
- Occupation: Actor
- Years active: 1990–2004

Michael James Galeota (August 28, 1984 – January 10, 2016) was an American actor. He was best known for his role as Nick Lighter in the Disney Channel series The Jersey.

== Early life ==
Galeota was born in Smithtown, New York. He had three brothers: David, Tony and Jimmy. Galeota graduated from Bellarmine-Jefferson High School in 2002.

== Death ==
In January 2016, Galeota was hospitalized after complaining of abdominal pains, but left treatment against doctor's orders. On January 10, he was found dead by a friend at his home in Glendale, California. He was 31 years old. No precise cause of death was released, but the Los Angeles County Coroner's Office stated that Galeota had several health problems, including hypertension and high cholesterol. He also suffered from diverticulitis. An autopsy was pending as of January 11, 2016. On September 12, 2016, it was revealed Galeota died as a result of cardiovascular disease and hypertension.

== Filmography ==
=== Film ===
Year	Title	Role	Notes
1991	Women & Men 2	Andy Meadows	Television film
1994	Secret Santa	Clay	Short film
1995	Bushwhacked	Dana Jareki	
1996	Clubhouse Detectives	Billy Ruckman	
1996	Rattled	Adam	Television film
1999	Can't Be Heaven	Archie Larocca	
2003	Missing Brendan	Sean Calden (age 16)	

=== Television ===
Year	Title	Role	Notes
1990	The Baby-Sitters Club	David Michael Thomas	2 episodes
1995	ER	Joseph O'Connor	Episode: "Days Like This"
1996	Bailey Kipper's P.O.V.	Bailey Kipper	13 episodes
1997	Profiler	Ace	Episode: "Blue Highway"
1997	Ally McBeal	Billy Thomas (ages 12–14)	Episode: "Pilot"
1999–2004	The Jersey	Nick Lighter	56 episodes
2001	The Nightmare Room	Todd Rossi	2 episodes
