= RYOT =

American media company

- Founded: 2012
- Founders: Bryn Mooser, David Darg, Martha Rogers, Molly DeWolf Swenson
- Location: United States
- Origins: Los Angeles
- Key people: Bryn Mooser, David Darg, Molly Swenson, Martha Rogers, Gareth Seltzer
- Parent organization: Yahoo Inc.
- Subsidiaries: RYOT Studio, RYOT Films, RYOT Lab
- Employees: 70+
- Website: www.ryot.org

RYOT /ˈraɪət/ (or, riot) was an American immersive media company founded in 2012 by Bryn Mooser, David Darg, Molly DeWolf Swenson and Martha Rogers, based in Los Angeles. It specializes in documentary film production, commercial production, virtual reality and augmented reality.

In April 2016, RYOT was acquired by HuffPost. In May 2021, RYOT was acquired by Apollo Global Management alongside other Verizon Media properties for $5 billion. The transaction was closed on September 1, 2021.

== History ==
=== Founding and early years ===
Bryn Mooser and David Darg met in Haiti during the weeks after the earthquake of January 2010. Both were in the country doing humanitarian work, Mooser with Artists for Peace and Justice, to build a school, and Darg with Operation Blessing, to build water and sanitation systems. After working alongside each other and becoming friends, Mooser and Darg had the idea to create a baseball league for the young boys of the Tabarre neighborhood of Port-au-Prince.

Soon after, Mooser and Darg returned home to America, brought on Molly DeWolf Swenson as COO, and launched RYOT News as “the first news site linking news to action.”

Founding investors are Canadians Martha Rogers and Gareth Seltzer, and other notable funders include Todd Wagner and Jason Calacanis.

Celebrity activists Olivia Wilde, Ian Somerhalder, Ben Stiller and Sophia Bush were early supporters of RYOT. Olivia Wilde and Elon Musk have been Executive Producers on multiple RYOT Films.

Founding Directors of the company alongside Mooser and Darg were Stash Slionski and Stacey Leasca while the first reporters included Benjamin Roffee, Vanessa Black, Stefan Todorovic, Tyson Sadler and Christian Stephen.

Mooser and Darg documented their work with the young boys in Haiti in their Tribeca award-winning film Baseball in the Time of Cholera, which follows the rise of the Tabarre Tigers and the concurrent outbreak of cholera in Haiti. The film played at film festivals and finished with a Congressional screening in Washington, D.C. A year later, Mooser and Darg, debuted their third film at the 2013 Tribeca Film Festival, a documentary short titled The Rider and The Storm, which chronicles a New York surfer who lost everything in the Breezy Point fires during Hurricane Sandy.

=== 2015-present: VR and later productions ===
Executive-produced by Olivia Wilde and Paul Allen, Body Team 12 profiles a young Liberian health worker who collects the bodies of the dead in Monrovia at the height of the Ebola outbreak in 2014. It debuted on HBO in February 2016. On Her Shoulders, a documentary about Nadia Murad's fight against ISIS, debuted in competition at Sundance Film Festival in January 2018, where it won a Directing award for a U.S. Documentary.

The Painter of Jalouzi was the first documentary to be shot entirely on an iPhone 6S Plus.

RYOT began producing 360/VR videos for other media organizations, advertisers and nonprofits in 2015. In their first produced 360/VR films for partners such as The New York Times, NPR, The Associated Press, Huffington Post and Sierra Club.

RYOT is credited as the first company to capture in 360 video,1. An active war zone (Syria), a disaster zone (Nepal), underwater with wild dolphins (Bahamas), and is the first company to produce VR news and comedy series on a major network (Hulu).

== Divisions ==
RYOT Studio is Verizon Media's in-house branded content agency.

RYOT Films creates content in traditional & immersive formats across film, TV, digital, and VR, producing content for clients.

RYOT Lab is Verizon Media's technology and innovation hub for emerging technologies, in partnership with Verizon Lab.

== Awards and nominations ==
RYOT Films was nominated for an Academy Award for Best Documentary (Short Subject) for Body Team 12 in January 2016. Body Team 12 was also honored at the Tribeca Film Festival, the Mountainfilm Festival, the Palm Springs International Film Festival, and the Austin Film Festival for Best Documentary Short.

== Filmography ==
Year	Film	Director	Release date	Notes
2011	Sun City Picture House	David Darg	October 15, 2011	Production
2012	Baseball in the Time of Cholera	David Darg, Bryn Mooser	April 21, 2012	Production
2013	The Rider and the Storm	David Darg, Bryn Mooser	2013	Production
2014	Meet the Hitlers	Matthew Ogens	October 18, 2014	Co-Production (on Showtime)
2014	Mitimetallica	David Darg, Bryn Mooser	December 5, 2014	Production
2014	Positive	Linus Ignatius	2014	Production (in association with)
2015	Gardeners of Eden	Austin Peck, Anneliese Vandenberg	April 24, 2015	Co-Production (on Netflix)
2015	Body Team 12	David Darg	April 19, 2015	Co-Production (on HBO)
2015	Sailing a Sinking Sea	Olivia Wyatt	March 14, 2015	Production
2015	Sweet Micky For President	Ben Patterson	January 24, 2015	Co-Production (on Showtime)
2015	The Painter of Jalouzi	Bryn Mooser	September 25, 2015	Production
2015	Salam Neighbor	Zach Ingrasci, Chris Temple	June 20, 2015	Production
2016	El Púgil	Angel Manuel Soto	2016	Production
2016	Watani: My Homeland	Marcel Mettelsiefen	April 12, 2016	Production (in association with)
2016	Wasfia (based on the life of Wasfia Nazreen)	Sean Kusanagi	May 2016	Production (on National Geographic)
2018	On Her Shoulders	Alexandria Bombach	January 2018	Production
2019	Earth	Nigel Tierney, Federico Heller	April 2019	Music video production
2021	Flee	Jonas Poher Rasmussen	December 2021	Production

=== Virtual reality filmography ===
Year	Film	Director	Notes
2015	Growing Up Girl	David Darg	Production
2015	The Crossing	Tyson Sadler	Production
2016	Big Picture: News in Virtual Reality		Production
2016	Virtually Mike and Nora	Nora Kirkpatrick	Production
2016	Bashir's Dream	Angel Manuel Soto	Production
2018	Take Every Wave: Laird in VR	Tarik Benbrahim	Production
2018	Dinner Party	Angel Manuel Soto	Production
2019	Tales From The Edge	Tarik Benbrahim	Production
