= Bryn Mooser =

American filmmaker

- Born: September 20, 1979 (age 47); Los Angeles, California
- Occupations: Film producer, director
- Spouse: Nora Kirkpatrick (m. 2016; div. 2022)

Bryn Mooser (born September 20, 1979) is an American filmmaker and entrepreneur. He has produced more than 200 films and is a two-time Academy Award nominee, receiving nominations for Body Team 12 (2015) and Lifeboat (2018), both in the Best Documentary Short Film category. His work has also received multiple News & Documentary Emmy Awards, as well as a Peabody Award and other industry honors. Mooser co-founded the media company RYOT, which was acquired by Verizon in 2016, and subsequently founded the documentary production studio XTR in 2019.

== Early life and education ==
Mooser grew up in Bar Harbor, Maine, and went to MDI High School. He studied film at the Bennington College before joining the Peace Corps.

== Career ==
Mooser began his career as a humanitarian aid worker in the Peace Corps in West Africa. In 2010 following the Haiti earthquake Mooser moved to Port-au-Prince and became the country director for Artists for Peace and Justice. While in Haiti, Mooser set out to build a media company with the aim of providing people with an interactive news experience and co-founded RYOT in 2012.

Following the earthquake in Nepal, Mooser got involved in virtual reality filmmaking after shooting a scene at the rubble of Kathmandu. His work expanded to include 360 video and virtual reality and aimed to provide an immersive experience whereby one could interact with the visual content and take actions, such as donating for relief operations via Apple Pay.

In 2016, he sold RYOT to Verizon.

In July 2018, RYOT entered a partnership with Vice Studios to fund and co-produce documentary films. Mooser served as the CEO and co-founder of RYOT until November 2018, when he left the company to pursue new opportunities.

Mooser helped launch virtual reality news reporting with the Associated Press in 2015. He also helped bring augmented reality to Time magazine in 2018.

In 2019, Mooser launched XTR, a company focused on non-fiction film and television studio based in Echo Park, Los Angeles.

In the 2020s, he expanded his work into artificial-intelligence-based filmmaking, founding Asteria, a production studio focused on the use of generative AI in film and television. Asteria has developed AI-assisted production workflows and has collaborated with technology companies on tools intended for professional filmmakers. Mooser has also been involved in humanitarian work, including initiatives in Haiti and West Africa.

== Awards and nominations ==
His film with David Darg, Baseball in the Time of Cholera became the winner of a jury award at the Tribeca Film Festival in 2012.

In 2016, Mooser was a Peabody Award finalist for his work in "The Gardeners of Eden". Apart from these, he has received the Kenneth Cole Courageous Class award and the Nelson Mandela Changemaker Award in 2016.

Mooser co-produced Body Team 12 with David Darg, which was nominated in the Documentary Short Subject category of the 2016 Oscars. Mooser won an Emmy award for the same in "Outstanding short documentary" category.

His film Lifeboat also received a Documentary Short Subject nomination in the 2019 Oscars.

Mooser's film On Her Shoulders, for which he served as one of the executive producers, was one of the winners of the 2019 DuPont-Columbia Awards. He was brought in as a member of the Motion Picture Academy in July 2019, as part of their efforts of bringing in new members every year.

== Personal life ==
Mooser spent three years in the Peace Corps in West Africa and was the country director for Artists for Peace and Justice in Haiti. While in Haiti he helped build the nation's largest cholera center and a high school in Port-au-Prince that today educates nearly 3,000 Haitian youth per year. For his charitable work, Mooser was made a recipient of the Nelson Mandela Changemaker Award in 2016, and Esquire magazine named him as one of their Americans of the Year.

Mooser was married to actress, director, writer and musician Nora Kirkpatrick from 2016 to 2022.
