= Asinabka Film and Media Arts Festival =

Film festival in Ottawa, Ontario, Canada

The Asinabka Film and Media Arts Festival is an annual film festival in Ottawa, Ontario, Canada, which programs a lineup of films related to First Nations, Métis, Inuit and other international indigenous peoples. Named for the traditional Algonquin language name of Victoria Island in the city's Chaudière Falls, the event was launched in 2012 by Howard Adler and Christopher Wong after they attended a Bollywood film event at Library and Archives Canada and began to wonder why the city had no similar events devoted to indigenous film.

Staged at the Ottawa Art Gallery, the event also includes art exhibitions, musical performances and panel discussions as well as films.
