= Half Cut Tea =

- Genre: documentary
- Created by: Matt Glass and Jordan Wayne Long
- Presented by: Jordan Wayne Long
- Composer: Matt Glass
- Country of origin: United States
- Original language: English
- No. of seasons: 3
- No. of episodes: 20

Original release
- Release: 2013 – 2014

Half Cut Tea is a web-series dedicated to the understanding and exploration of artists through short documentary videos. The series is produced by a two-person team (Jordan Wayne Long and Matt Glass) that travels the country looking for artists and telling their stories through short documentary films. Episodes from the series have been licensed to several programs across the world including KCET's Artbound and Belgium's Lust For Life.

== History ==
The first season was released in early 2013. It consisted of 8 episodes featuring a wide variety of artists from performance artists to a puppeteer working at a burlesque night club in Los Angeles. For Season Two, Half Cut Tea raised money through Kickstarter where in exchange, donators received DVD copies of Season One and CDs of the soundtrack.

Season Two of Half Cut Tea began in July 2013. The first episode got the attention of several press outlets including MSNBC and Yahoo who described it by saying:

"... the glass cabin and the video are an inspiring story about youth and dreams."

In the months that followed, Half Cut Tea released an episode ever two weeks for the rest of the year. The series featured a variety of artists including actor/director Sandeep Parikh and inventor/tinkerer JJ Dasher.

The Company Half Cut Tea has expanded its reach into both Fiction content and Music Videos. The creators of Half Cut Tea, Matt Glass and Jordan Wayne Long, started HCT.media in 2015. Their clients include The Jim Henson Company, BBC, NPR, KCET, LINK TV and more. Their work has been featured in The No Budget Film Festival for the past two years.

== Episodes ==
=== Season 1 (2013) ===
Title	Directors	Original airdate	Season	Episode
"William Connally - Photographer"	Matt Glass and Jordan Wayne Long	January 25, 2013	1	01
In order to create his photographs, William Connally writes short stories and makes drawings detailing and describing the characters who've just recently vacated the scene. He draws inspiration for his original work from literary sources including Franz Kafka, Edith Wharton, and J.D. Salinger, as well as film noir, and amateur theater productions.
"Mark Jones - Teacher"	Matt Glass and Jordan Wayne Long	February 1, 2013	1	02
Mark discusses his student-made film The Robot and the Butterfly, which was shot during school hours with over 600 students ranging from K-6 grades who did everything from building the sets to moving the characters for the stop motion animation.
"Jordan Wayne Long - Performance Artist"	Matt Glass and Jordan Wayne Long	February 8, 2013	1	03
In this short documentary, the determination he displays during his performance work is mirrored in his quest for a decent sweet tea.
"BEVERLY FRE$H - Artist/Musician"	Matt Glass and Jordan Wayne Long	February 15, 2013	1	04
He has broken several Guinness Book World Records including breaking the most eggs on his head and compiling the tallest stack of rap tapes. He's performed in a variety of venues including Machu Picchu, atop the Great Wall of China, Liquor store parking lots and Check Point Charlie in Berlin
"Sean Joseph Patrick Carney - Writer/Concrete Comedian"	Matt Glass and Jordan Wayne Long	February 22, 2013	1	05
Sean is a comedian, artist and published writer living and working in Portland, OR. In 2009, Carney founded Social Malpractice Publishing, an independent label that produces editions of artist books.
"Emily Nachison - Sculptor/Installation Artist"	Matt Glass and Jordan Wayne Long	March 1, 2013	1	06
She works with various materials from burlap to glass and pulls from nature and the process of change it goes through. Recently, she received an Artistic Focus Project Grant from the Regional Arts and Culture Council in Portland, Oregon.
"Jeff Speetjens - Puppeteer"	Matt Glass and Jordan Wayne Long	March 28, 2013	1	07
At Bootsy Bellows, a nightclub on Sunset Blvd in West Hollywood, Jeff performs with a variety of marionettes from the stage to the dance floor.
"Kristina Gerig - Designer"	Matt Glass and Jordan Wayne Long	April 12, 2013	1	08
Kristina Gerig is a designer living in Portland, OR where she works for Nike as a materials designer and produces her own work for galleries nationwide.

=== Season 2 (2013) ===
Title	Directors	Original airdate	Season	Episode
"Nick Olson & Lilah Horwitz - Makers"	Matt Glass and Jordan Wayne Long	July 25, 2013	2	01
In 2012, Nick Olson and Lilah Horwitz quit their jobs and set off to build a glass cabin in the mountains of West Virginia.
"Wesley Taylor - Graphic Designer"	Matt Glass and Jordan Wayne Long	August 8, 2013	2	02
Wesley Taylor is a graphic designer living in Detroit. He's not in Detroit because it needs him, he's there because of the city's long legacy of making, and it fits him well.
"Jennifer Catron & Paul Outlaw - Performance Artists"	Matt Glass and Jordan Wayne Long	August 22, 2013	2	03
Jennifer Catron and Paul Outlaw are two southern artists who live in Brooklyn, NY and are changing the way the world looks at performance art.
"Sandeep Parikh" - Writer/Director	Matt Glass and Jordan Wayne Long	September 5, 2013	2	04
Sandeep Parikh is a writer/director based out of LA. He's a jack of all trades and pioneer when comes to producing online content.
"Haynes Riley" - Curator/Artist	Matt Glass and Jordan Wayne Long	September 19, 2013	2	05
Haynes Riley is a 2D designer and owner of the “Good Weather” garage gallery in North Little Rock, Arkansas.
"JJ Dasher" - Tinkerer	Matt Glass and Jordan Wayne Long	October 3, 2013	2	06
From a Tesla coil and micro-bike made in his garage to a GPS hacking system and the Doombox, whatever peaks his curiosity, he goes towards it.
"Abigail Anne Newbold" - Installation Artist	Matt Glass and Jordan Wayne Long	October 17, 2013	2	07
She lives in one of the most densely populated towns in America, and it's reflected in her work which deals with escaping society through the creation of isolated, hand-crafted utopias.
"Behind The Scenes" - Season Two	Matt Glass and Jordan Wayne Long	October 31, 2013	2	08
For this episode, we go behind the scenes of Season Two thus far and get a look at the two person team behind Half Cut Tea documentaries. utopias.
"David Lewandowski" - Director/Animator	Matt Glass and Jordan Wayne Long	November 16, 2013	2	09
David is a self-taught artist who made a name for himself by doing commercials for companies like Pepsi Co. and visual effects for TRON:Legacy and Oblivion.
"Brian DuBois" - Builder	Matt Glass and Jordan Wayne Long	November 28, 2013	2	10
He works out of his warehouse off 9 mile in Detroit. If there is one thing to say about Brian, it's that he is driven. He just doesn't stop. He's creating work that's meant to last, and he's sacrificed a lot to pursue his dreams

== Music ==
For each episode, Matt Glass creates an original song based around of the artist. These songs quickly become available on bandcamp, when the episodes are released.
