= Living on One Dollar =

- Produced by: Chris Temple; Zach Ingrasci; Sean Leonard; Ryan Christoffersen
- Distributed by: Gravitas Ventures
- Release dates: April 13, 2013 (Sonoma International Film Festival); January 1, 2015 (Netflix)
- Country: Guatemala
- Languages: English, Spanish

Living on One Dollar is a documentary film directed, produced, and edited by Chris Temple, Zach Ingrasci, Sean Leonard, and Ryan Christoffersen.

== Premise ==
The film follows the experience of four young friends as they live on less than $1 a day for two months in rural Guatemala. They battle hunger, parasites and the realization that there are no easy answers. Yet, the generosity and strength of Rosa, a 20-year-old woman with her husband Anthony, and Chino, a 12-year-old boy, gives them hope that there are effective ways to make a difference.

== Inception ==
The project did not start out as a film, but rather short YouTube videos that went viral, amassing over 650,000 views on the platform. Inspired by the response, the four college friends produced a 56-minute film from the experience. They have since taken the film on a national tour to 25 major universities, receiving coverage on CBS This Morning with Charlie Rose. The film won best documentary for the audience award at the Sonoma International Film Festival. Nobel Laureate Muhammad Yunus calls it "a must watch film, that provides a unique look into the hardship and hope of life in extreme poverty." Similarly, Gary Ross, the writer and director of the first Hunger Games film, calls the film "moving, inspiring and important.". Due to their film and impact work, directors Temple and Ingrasci have been recognized alongside Angelina Jolie and Bill Gates as two of the top 100 Visionary Leaders of 2015 by Real Leaders magazine.
