= Chris Temple =

American documentary filmmaker

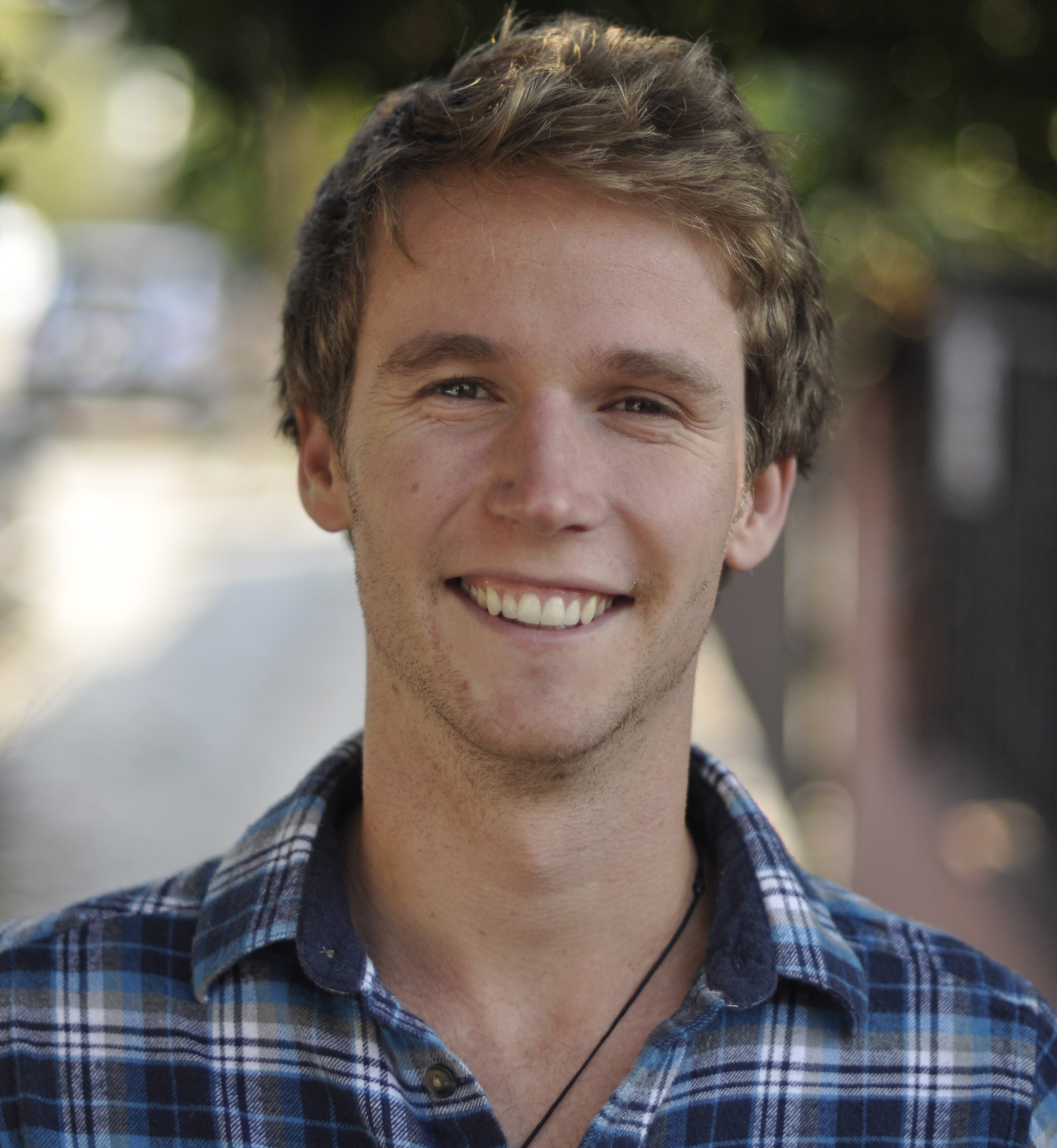
- Temple in 2022
- Education: Claremont McKenna College

Chris Temple (born May 20, 1989) is an American documentary filmmaker. In 2012, he co-founded the Emmy-winning non-profit production company Optimist alongside Zach Ingrasci.

== Career ==
Temple's first documentary was Living on One Dollar in 2012. The film focuses on life in extreme poverty in the rural Guatemalan town of Pena Blanca. It was co-created with Zach Ingrasci, Sean Leonard, and Ryan Christoffersen. The film released on Netflix in 2015.

In 2015, Temple co-directed his second documentary Salam Neighbor. The film documents life inside of the Za'atari refugee camp and was a co-production with 1001 Media. The film premiered at AFI Docs film festival in 2015 and released on Netflix in 2016. The film was awarded the 2016 Muslim Public Affairs Council Annual Media Awards.

Temple's filmography also includes co-directing The Undocumented Lawyer (HBO 2020), Five Years North (PBS, 2020), Free to Care (2022), This Is Not Financial Advice (Fuse, 2023), and Vitalik: An Ethereum Story (Amazon 2025). He produced Rosa - These Storms (The Atlantic, 2016) and ImillaSkate (Nowness, 2025). Temple is also a frequent keynote speaker and contributor to the Huffington Post.

This Is Not Financial Advice, premiered at the Tribeca Film Festival in June 2023. According to Investopedia, it "shows the human side of crypto, meme craze, and influencers." As the Verge put it, "unlike other efforts to document the boom of retail investing, This Is Not Financial Advice isn't a cheap content grab. This beautifully shot and scored documentary from Chris Temple and Zach Ingrasci is a genuine, if slightly naive, piece of art."

In 2024, Temple Executive Produced the feature documentary Champions of the Golden Valley. The film is also Executive Produced by Nobel-Laureate Malala Yousafzai and Emmy and Tony nominated actor, Arian Moayed. The Oscar-qualified film was acquired in December 2025 by the Olympics.com.

Optimist and Temple's 2025 feature documentary, State of Firsts, follows Rep. Sarah McBride's history-making campaign as the first transgender person ever to be elected to Congress. The film is directed by Chase Joynt. It premiered at Tribeca Film Festival in June, 2025.

== Directing filmography ==
Year	Title	Director	Producer	Exec Producer	Note	Watch
2026	State of Firsts			✓	Feature Documentary	
2025	Champions of the Golden Valley			✓	Feature Documentary	The Olympics.com
2025	ImillaSkate		✓	✓	Short Documentary	Nowness
2025	Vitalik: An Ethereum Story	✓	✓		Feature Documentary	Tubi
2024	All Things Metal			✓	Short Documentary	Rolling Stone
2023	This Is Not Financial Advice	✓	✓		Feature Documentary	Fuse & Tubi
2023	Abundance			✓	Short Documentary	YouTube
2022	Free to Care	✓	✓		Short Documentary	Documentary+
2022	Paperboy Love Prince			✓	Short Documentary	YouTube
2021	Five Years North	✓	✓		Feature Documentary	PBS
2021	The Urchin Diver			✓	Short Documentary	YouTube
2020	The Undocumented Lawyer	✓	✓		Short Documentary	HBO
2016	For My Son	✓			Short Documentary	YouTube
2016	Salam Neighbor	✓	✓		Feature Documentary	Netflix
2015	Rosa - These Storms		✓		Short Documentary	The Atlantic
2012	Living on One Dollar	✓	✓		Feature Documentary	Netflix

== Awards ==
- 2015 Top 100 Visionary Leaders by Real Leaders Magazine
- 2017 Daily Point of Light Award
- 2020 DuPont-Columbia Award Finalist for outstanding journalism
- 2022 Imagen Award Finalist
- 2022 40 Under 40 by HBO and DOC NYC
- 2024 Nominee for the Astra Award for Best Feature Documentary
- 2205 Winner for Best Social Impact Production Company
- 2026 Nominated for an Emmy for Outstanding Sports Feature: Long Form
- 2026 Nominated for an Emmy for Outstanding Sports Documentary: Long
