= David Darg =

Film Director

David Darg is an American director and cinematographer. In 2011 he co-founded the media company RYOT with Bryn Mooser. He received critical praise for his documentary Body Team 12 which garnered him a nomination for the Academy Award for Best Documentary (Short Subject) at the 88th Academy Awards.

== Career ==
Darg is a graduate of Oxford University with a degree in Philosophy. He was named one of Esquire Magazine's "2012 Americans of the Year" for his work in Haiti as well as a "Hollywood Maverick" by Details magazine for his documentary work in crisis and disaster zones. Darg is the co-founder of RYOT - a US media company acquired by Verizon in 2016.

In 2015, Darg directed the first virtual reality film shot in a disaster zone. That same year, Darg was commissioned by Apple to create a short documentary using the iPhone 6s ahead of the phone's release.

Darg is also an Emmy winning editor having won in 2017 with Body Team 12 and nominated in 2018 with Fear Us Women.

=== Filmography ===
- 2010: Sun City Picture House
- 2012: Baseball in the Time of Cholera (nominated at the International Film Festival of Wales)
- 2013: The Rider and The Storm
- 2014: Mitimetallica
- 2015: Body Team 12
- 2015: Nepal Quake Project (Virtual Reality Film)
- 2015: The Painter of Jalouzie
- 2016: The Rugby Boys of Memphis
- 2017: Fear Us Women
- 2018: The Robben Island Mandela Experience (Augmented Reality)
- 2018: The Young Lions (Virtual Reality Film)
- 2019: Lazarus
- 2020: You Cannot Kill David Arquette

== Humanitarian Work ==
Darg spent over a decade as a humanitarian first responder and frontline contributor for Reuters, the BBC and CNN, covering natural disasters and wars. He lived in China for 1 year following the 2008 Sichuan quake and lived in a Haiti for 2.5 years after the 2010 earthquake. He has traveled to over 100 countries with experience in cross sector humanitarian development and relief work alongside his position as Vice-president for International Response at Operation Blessing International.
