= Thomas Hobson (actor) =

American actor

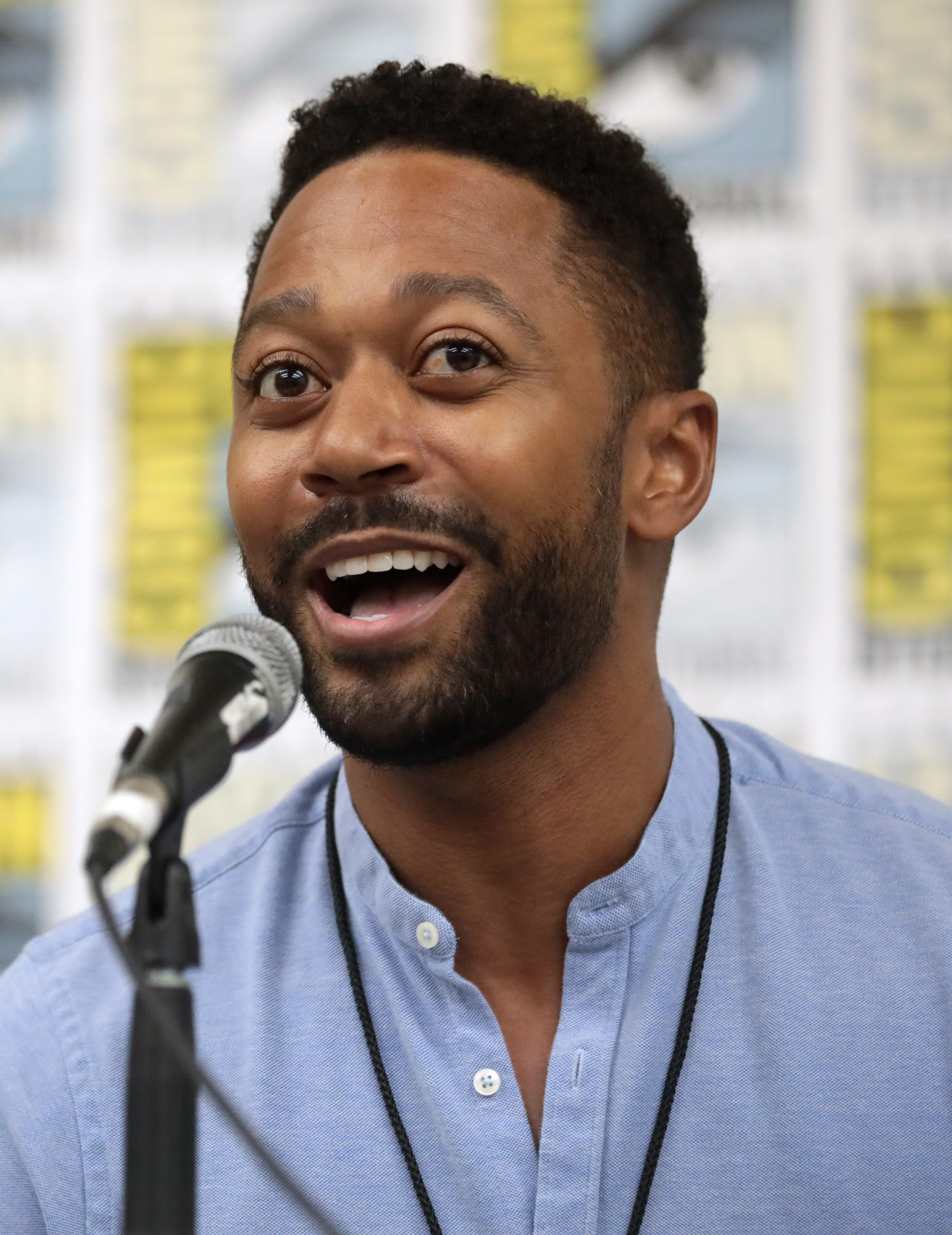
- Thomas Hobson at the 2021 San Diego Comic-Con
- Born: June 8, 1982 (age 44)
- Occupation: Actor
- Years active: 1990–present
- Spouse: Wilkie Ferguson

Thomas Hobson (born June 8, 1982) is an American stage, film, and television actor and singer. He is best known for his roles as Shout in the Nick Jr. Channel television series The Fresh Beat Band and its animated spin-off Fresh Beat Band of Spies and Bryce in the Nickelodeon television series That Girl Lay Lay. He has also starred in films such as Clubhouse Detectives (1996), Free Enterprise (1999), 12 Hour Shift (2020) and Ghosts of the Ozarks (2021).

He began acting when he was six years old, and received a BA in Theatre Studies from Yale University in 2004.

== Career ==
Hobson appeared in The Hogan Family in the 1990s and in Malcolm in the Middle in the early 2000s.

In 2005, Hobson performed in the play North Beach, written by Bill Swadley and directed by Taylor Nichols. Billboard reported that his performance was convincing and skillful.

In 2006, he performed at the MaCadden Theatre in Los Angeles in a retelling of The Madwoman of Chaillot as set in post-Katrina New Orleans. L.A. Splash wrote that the cast gave strong performances.

In 2008, he performed in the Citykid the Musical, which received six NAACP Image Awards.

In 2009, Hobson appeared on The Fresh Beat Band as Shout the piano player and assistant leader for the band, which stars his character's three best friends, Kiki, Twist and Marina.

The show, Nickelodeon's "most-music" show aimed at preschoolers, catapulted Thomas Hobson to national fame among adolescents. His performance on the musical show has been characterized by one reviewer as "cool beans" and was shot in Hollywood, California.

From September 2021 to March 2024, Hobson starred on the Nickelodeon show, That Girl Lay Lay.

== Personal life ==
Hobson is gay. He is married to Wilkie Ferguson III.

== Credits ==
=== Television ===
- Doctor Doctor (1 episode, 1990)
- The Hogan Family (1 episode, 1991)
- Dangerous Women (1991)
- In Living Color (1 episode, 1992) (cameo)
- Star Trek: Deep Space Nine (1 episode, 1993)
- A Different World (2 episodes, 1993)
- The Adventures of Brisco County, Jr. (1 episode, 1993)
- The Faculty (1 episode, 1996)
- Step by Step (2 episodes, 1997)
- Michael Jordan: An American Hero (1999)
- The Fresh Beat Band (all episodes, 2009–2013)
- Fresh Beat Band of Spies (all episodes, 2015–2016)
- Criminal Minds (1 Episode, 2013)
- Dynasty (1 Episode, 2018)
- Bunk'd (1 episode, 2021)
- That Girl Lay Lay (2021)

=== Films ===
- Clubhouse Detectives (1996)
- Free Enterprise (1999)
- Daydreams (2008)
- Bar Starz (2008)
- Set Apart (2009)
- 12 Hour Shift (2020)
- Ghosts of the Ozarks (2021)

=== Video games ===
- Nickelodeon Dance (2011)

=== Short films ===
- Wrapped Up In You (2018)

== Awards and nominations ==
- 1996, Young Artist Awards nomination, 'Best Performance in a TV Movie/Home Video', for Clubhouse Detectives
