= Lifeboat (2018 film) =

2018 documentary short film by Skye Fitzgerald

- Film poster
- Directed by: Skye Fitzgerald
- Produced by: Bryn Moosre; Skye Fitzgerald
- Cinematography: Kenny Allen
- Edited by: Dan Sadowsky
- Music by: William Campbell
- Production companies: Spin Film; RYOT Films
- Distributed by: The New Yorker
- Release date: August 1, 2018 (TCFF)
- Running time: 34 minutes
- Country: United States
- Language: English

Lifeboat is a 2018 documentary short film about North African migrants trying to make it across the Mediterranean Sea safely.

== Accolades ==
- Nominated: Academy Award for Best Documentary (Short Subject) - 91st Academy Awards
- Nominated: Best Short - IDA Documentary Awards 2018
- Nominated: Outstanding Current Affairs Documentary - 40th News and Documentary Emmy Awards
