= Vulcan Productions =

American documentary production company

- Type: Private
- Industry: Motion picture
- Founder: Paul Allen and Jody Allen
- Headquarters: Seattle, Washington
- Key people: Jody Allen (Founder and Interim Chairman)
- Products: Movies, documentaries, television films and specials

Vulcan Productions produced documentary films, television programming and virtual reality experiences that drove awareness around environmental and social issues. The company was founded in 1997 by late Microsoft co-founder Paul Allen and his sister Jody Allen. It closed in 2021.

The company financed and co-produced films with directors such as Martin Scorsese, Clint Eastwood and Robert Redford. Its films and TV series had aired on video on-demand services like Netflix, HBO and Hulu and across networks like The Discovery Channel and National Geographic. Films produced by Vulcan Productions won Peabody Awards and received Academy Award nominations. The company focused on raising awareness on issues like mental health, girl's education, veterans, parenting, wildlife conservation, ocean health, climate change and modern-day slavery.

== History ==
Vulcan Productions began under the name "Clear Blue Sky Productions" and received its first critical success with the feature film Titus (1999). The company continued to produce feature films including Far From Heaven, Where God Left His Shoes, and Hard Candy. With a name change in 2011, the then-Vulcan Productions shifted its measure of success from box office numbers and critical ratings to driving social impact and world change. The company exclusively produced Social impact entertainment with a focus on topics ranging from wildlife and conservation, global health, contemporary social issues, science, technology, history and exploration.

As part of the larger Vulcan Inc. organization, Vulcan Productions’ mission was to “change minds and ignite action through the power of storytelling.”

On May 27, 2020 Vulcan Inc. announced that Vulcan Productions would be shutdown in 2021 citing the "economic impacts of the COVID-19 crisis" as well as "the ongoing transition after Paul Allen's passing in 2018." A few weeks after winning top honors at the Sundance Film Festival for Summer of Soul, Vulcan Productions ceased operations.

== Films ==
Year	Film	Type	Release date	Director	Co-producers	Starring	Distributor	Awards
1997	Inspirations (film)	Documentary film	1997	Michael Apted	Argo Films			
1999	Titus (film)	Feature film	25 December 1999	Julie Taymor	Overseas Film Group	Anthony Hopkins Jessica Lange Alan Cumming Colm Feore	Fox Searchlight Pictures	
1999	Me & Isaac Newton	Documentary film	1999	Michael Apted		Gertrude B. Elion Ashok Gadgil Michio Kaku Maja Matarić	First Look International Home Vision Entertainment	
2001	Nova: Cracking the Code of Life	Television documentary	17 April 2001	Elizabeth Arledge	PBS	Robert Krulwich (Journalist)	PBS	
2001	Evolution	Television special	2001	David Espar "Darwin's Dangerous Idea" Susan K. Lewis "Darwin's Dangerous Idea" Joel Olicker "Great Transformations" Kate Churchill "Extinction!" Richard Hutton "Extinction!" Gail Wilumsen "Evolutionary Arms race"	PBS	Liam Neeson (Narrator)	PBS	
2003	Far from Heaven	Feature film	10 January 2003	Todd Haynes	Focus Features	Julianne Moore Dennis Quaid Dennis Haysbert Patricia Clarkson	Focus Features	
2003	The Blues (film series)	Documentary series	28 September 2003	Martin Scorsese "Feel Like Going Home" Wim Wenders "The Soul of a Man" Richard Pearce (director) "The Road to Memphis" Charles Burnett (director) "Warming by the Devil's Fire" Marc Levin "Godfathers and Sons" Mike Figgis "Red, White and Blues" Clint Eastwood "Piano Blues"	Road Movies Filmproduktion	B.B. King Laurence Fishburne (Narrator) Ray Charles	PBS	
2004	Black Sky: The Race For Space	Documentary film	3 October 2004	Sandy Guthrie Jill Shinefield Scott B Gail Willumsen	Discovery Channel Gemini Productions Antenna Films	Burt Rutan Paul Allen James Benson	Discovery Channel	
2004	Lightning in a Bottle	Documentary film	5 August 2004	Antoine Fuqua	Jigsaw Productions	Aerosmith India Arie John Fogerty Gregg Allman	Sony Pictures Classics	
2004	Strange Days on Planet Earth	Television series	2004	David Elisco	Sea Studios Foundation National Geographic Society	Edward Norton (Narrator)	PBS	
2005	Hard Candy (film)	Feature film	21 January 2005	David Slade	Launchpad Productions	Elliot Page (Note: Credited as Ellen Page; Hard Candy was released before Page came out as transgender.) Patrick Wilson Sandra Oh	Lionsgate Films	
2005	Success at the Core	Educational film	2005	Richard Hutton	Education Development Center		Teaching Channel	
2005	Rx For Survival	Documentary series	2005	Mike Beckham (Producer) “Disease Warriors” Sara Holt (Producer) “Rise of the Superbugs” Andy Young (Producer) “Deadly Messengers” Tabitha Jackson (Producer) “Back to the Basics” Rob Whittlesey (Producer) “How Safe Are We?”	WGBH Educational Foundation	Brad Pitt (Narrator)	PBS	
2007	Judgment Day: Intelligent Design on Trial	Documentary film	13 November 2007	Gary Johnstone Joseph McMaster	WGBH Educational Foundation		PBS	
2007	Where God Left His Shoes	Feature film	2007	Salvatore Stabile		John Leguizamo Leonor Varela David Castro (actor)	IFC Films	
2010	This Emotional Life	Documentary series	4 January 2010	Matt Boatright-Simon	Kunhardt Films McGee Media	Daniel Gilbert (psychologist)	PBS	
2013	Girl Rising	Documentary film	2013	Richard E. Robbins	The Documentary Group Double Exposure Studios	Narration by Anne Hathaway Cate Blanchett Selena Gomez Liam Neeson Meryl Streep Kerry Washington	CNN Films Netflix	
2013	Pandora's Promise	Documentary film		Robert Stone (director)	Robert Stone Productions		CNN Films	
2014	We The Economy: 20 Short Films You Can't Afford To Miss	Documentary film	2014	22 directors including, but not limited to: Morgan Spurlock Catherine Hardwicke Adrian Grenier Adam McKay Lee Hirsch	Cinelan	Morgan Spurlock James Schamus Adrian Grenier Judah Friedlander among others	45 different distribution partners Including, but not limited to: Amazon Video Netflix Comcast Google Play Time Warner Cable	
2015	Body Team 12	Documentary film	2015	David Darg	RYOT Films		HBO	
2015	Racing Extinction	Documentary film	18 September 2015	Louie Psihoyos	Oceanic Preservation Society Okeanos Li Ka Shing Foundation Insurgent Docs	Elon Musk Jane Goodall Leilani Munter Joel Sartore	Discovery Channel	
2016	Midsummer in Newtown	Documentary film	1 April 2016	Lloyd Kramer	Participant Media	Jimmy Greene		
2016	Naledi: A Baby Elephant's Tale	Documentary film	5 June 2016	Ben Bowie Geoffrey Luck	Off the Fence Bigger Bang		Netflix	
2016	The Ivory Game	Documentary film	November 12, 2016	Richard Ladkani Kief Davidson	Terra Mater Factual Studios Malaika Pictures Appian Way	Elisifa Ngowi Craig Millar Andrea Crosta Hongxiang Huang Ofir Drori Ian Craig Georgina Kamanga	Netflix	
2016	Ocean Warriors	Television series	4 December 2016	Marc Benjamin Marc Levin	Sundance Productions Brick City TV	Sid Chakravarty Peter Hammerstedt	Animal Planet	
2017	Unseen Enemy	Documentary film	7 April 2017	Janet Tobias	Sierra/Tango Productions CNN Films		CNN Films Amazon Video	
2018	Ballet Now	Documentary film	4 June 2018	Steven Cantor	Stick Figure Studios	Tiler Peck	Hulu	
2018	X-Ray Fashion	VR short	29 August 2018	Francesco Carrozzini	MANND	Francesco Carrozzini		
2018	Chasing the Thunder	Documentary film	2 February 2018	Marc Benjamin Marc Levin	Brick City TV	Sid Chakravarty Peter Hammerstedt	Animal Planet	
2018	Memphis Belle: The Restoration	Documentary film	2018	William Wyler	Creative Differences			
2019	USS Indianapolis: The Final Chapter	Documentary film	8 January 2019	Kirk Wolfinger	Lone Wolf Media		PBS Amazon Video iTunes	
2019	Everest VR	VR short	10 April 2019	Jon Griffith Matthew Dejohn	Alpine Exposures Legend 3D	Sherpa Tenji Jon Griffith		
2019	Drop in the Ocean	VR short	25 April 2019	Philippe Cousteau Jr.	Vision3 Conservation International	Philippe Cousteau Ashlan Cousteau		
2019	Guardians of the Kingdom	VR short	26 April 2019	Sophie Ansel Christophe Bailhache	Underwater Earth Seaview 360 Projects for Good ITRAMAS Spinifex	Sylvia Earle Finau Molisi		
2019	The Cold Blue	Documentary film	6 June 2019	Erik Nelson	Creative Differences		HBO	
2019	Ghost Fleet	Documentary film	7 June 2019	Shannon Service Jeffrey Waldron	Seahorse Productions	Patima Tungpuchayakul Tun Lin Chutima "Oi" Sidasathian Bustar Maitar	TBD	
2019	Oliver Sacks: His Own Life	Documentary film	August 31, 2019	Ric Burns	Steeplechase Productions Motto Pictures PBS American Masters	Oliver Sacks	PBS American Masters	

Where God Left His Shoes

- Winner – The Humanitas Prize: 2008 Best Sundance Feature Film
- 2008 Imagen Awards
  - Nominated - Best Film
  - Nominated - Best Actor - John Leguizamo
  - Nominated - Best Supporting Actor - David Castro
  - Winner - Best Supporting Actress - Leonor Varela

Bickford Shmeckler's Cool Ideas

- 2006 U.S. Comedy Arts Festival
  - Best Actress - Olivia Wilde

Hard Candy (film)

- 2006 Malaga Film Festival
  - Best Film
  - Best Director - David Slade
  - Best Actress - Elliot Page
  - Best Cinematographer - Jo Willems
- 2005 Sitges Film Festival
  - Best Motion Picture
  - Best Screenplay
  - Audience Award for Best Motion Picture

Coastlines

Far from Heaven

- 75th Annual Academy Award nominations
  - Best Actress in a Leading Role - Julianne Moore
  - Best Cinematography - Edward Lachman
  - Best Writing (Original Screenplay) - Todd Haynes
  - Best Music (Score) - Elmer Bernstein
- Independent Spirit Awards winner:
- Best Picture
- Best Director - Todd Haynes
- Best Female Lead - Julianne Moore
- Best Supporting Male - Dennis Quaid
- Best Cinematography - Edward Lachman, A.S.C.
- Golden Globe Award nominations:
  - Best Actress - Julianne Moore (Drama)
  - Best Supporting Actor - Dennis Quaid
  - Best Screenplay - Todd Haynes
  - Best Music Score - Elmer Bernstein

The Safety of Objects

- Deauville Festival of American Film
  - International Critics Prize
  - Best Performance: Patricia Clarkson,
  - Ralph Lauren Fragrances Prize
- Seattle Women in Cinema Film Festival
  - Third-place prize
- San Sebastian International Film Festival
  - Nominated: Golden Seashell Award

The Luzhin Defence

Titus

- 2000 Academy Awards
  - Nominated: Best Costume Design
- 2000 Art Directors Guild
  - Nominated: Excellence in Production Design Award
- 2000 Italian National Syndicate of Film Journalists
  - Winner: Silver Ribbon Award – Best Production Design
- 2000 Edgar Allan Poe Awards
  - Nominated: Best Motion Picture
- 2000 Las Vegas Film Critics Society Awards
  - Nominated: Sierra Award – Best Costume Design
  - Best Screenplay – Adapted
- 2000 Satellite Awards
  - Winner: Gold Satellite – Best Performance by an Actor in a Supporting Role, Drama
  - Nominated: Best Art Direction, Production Design
  - Best Costume Design
  - Best Performance by an Actress in a Supporting Role, Drama
  - Best Screenplay – Adapted
  - Best Visual Effects
- 2001 London Critics Circle Film Awards
  - Nominated: Best British Actor of the Year

Men with Guns
