= Girl Rising (film) =

2013 documentary film

- Directed by: Richard E. Robbins
- Written by: Marie Arana (Peru); Doreen Baingana (Uganda); Edwidge Danticat (Haiti); Mona Eltahawy (Egypt); Aminatta Forna (Sierra Leone); Zarghuna Kargar (Afghanistan); Maaza Mengiste (Ethiopia); Sooni Taraporevala (India); Manjushree Thapa (Nepal); Loung Ung (Cambodia)
- Narrated by: Cate Blanchett (Haiti); Priyanka Chopra Jonas (India); Selena Gomez (Sierra Leone); Anne Hathaway (Afghanistan); Salma Hayek (Peru); Alicia Keys (Cambodia); Liam Neeson; Freida Pinto; Meryl Streep (Ethiopia); Kerry Washington (Nepal)
- Edited by: Gillian McCarthy
- Music by: Lorne Balfe; Rachel Portman
- Release date: 2013
- Country: United States
- Language: English
- Box office: $1.7 million

Girl Rising is a 2013 documentary film produced by Kayce Freed, Tom Yellin and Holly Gordon at The Documentary Group, in partnership with Paul G. Allen and Jody Allen of Vulcan Productions. It was directed by Academy Award nominee Richard E. Robbins and features narration by Anne Hathaway, Cate Blanchett, Selena Gomez, Liam Neeson, Sushmita Sen, Priyanka Chopra Jonas, Chloë Grace Moretz, Freida Pinto, Salma Hayek, Meryl Streep, Alicia Keys and Kerry Washington.

== Background and release ==
The movie tells the stories of nine girls from nine countries: (Sierra Leone, Haiti, Ethiopia, Afghanistan, Peru, Egypt, Nepal, India and Cambodia). Each girl had her story written by a writer from her country and voiced by renowned actors. Their stories reflect their struggles to overcome societal or cultural barriers. The writers are Loung Ung (Cambodia), Edwidge Danticat (Haiti), Manjushree Thapa (Nepal), Mona Eltahawy (Egypt), Maaza Mengiste (Ethiopia), Sooni Taraporevala (India), Maria Arana (Peru), Aminatta Forna (Sierra Leone), Zarghuna Kargar (Afghanistan). The girls' names are Sokha (Cambodia), Wadley (Haiti), Suma (Nepal), Yasmin (Egypt), Azmera (Ethiopia), Ruksana (India), Senna (Peru), Mariama (Sierra Leone) and Amina (Afghanistan). On CNN, director of the film Richard E. Robbins explained that:

On the first trip to each country … we went and did dozens and dozens of interviews and tried to find the right girl to be the focus of the film, although those choices about which girl it would be were ultimately made by the writers. It felt important to me that the writers who were going to write their stories choose for themselves who they felt most compelled to write about. And then the second trip, we went back and spent time with the writer and the girl together. … It wasn’t until the third trip that we actually sat out to try and make each piece.

Partial preview of the film and a panel discussion was held at Woodrow Wilson Center in Washington, D.C on February 25, 2013. Girl Rising premiered on CNN International on 22 June 2013.

== Critical reception ==
On review aggregator website Rotten Tomatoes, the film has an 80% rating, based on 10 reviews, Metacritic reports a 59 out of 100 rating, based on 10 critics, indicating mixed or average reviews. Saudi Garcia from Mic wrote that "The marriage between documentary film and the literary and performing arts culminates beautifully" in the film. Joya Taft-Dick from the same publication wrote that "Poignant and touching, the scenes of the young girls reenacting their stories gave a slight tug at the heart strings, while simultaneously staying away from being overly sentimental, or clichéd" and added that the pairing each girl with a writer from her country "lends a deeper understanding, nuance, and authenticity to those stories". Mark Feeney from The Boston Globe was less enthusiastic, criticizing the enactments present in the films and opined that while the film has good intentions, the price of this is that the film "looks and feels like an extended public-service announcement for goodness". Glenn Whipp from Los Angeles Times complimented the stories diversity, but felt that the "film’s re-creations, some involving actors and some the girls themselves, aren’t always successful".

== Music ==
The film is scored by Lorne Balfe, while Rachel Portman is cited for "ethiopia & interlinking music" in the film's credits. A digital soundtrack was released by 14th Street Music LLC containing eighteen tracks.
