= Jack Lewis (author) =

American writer

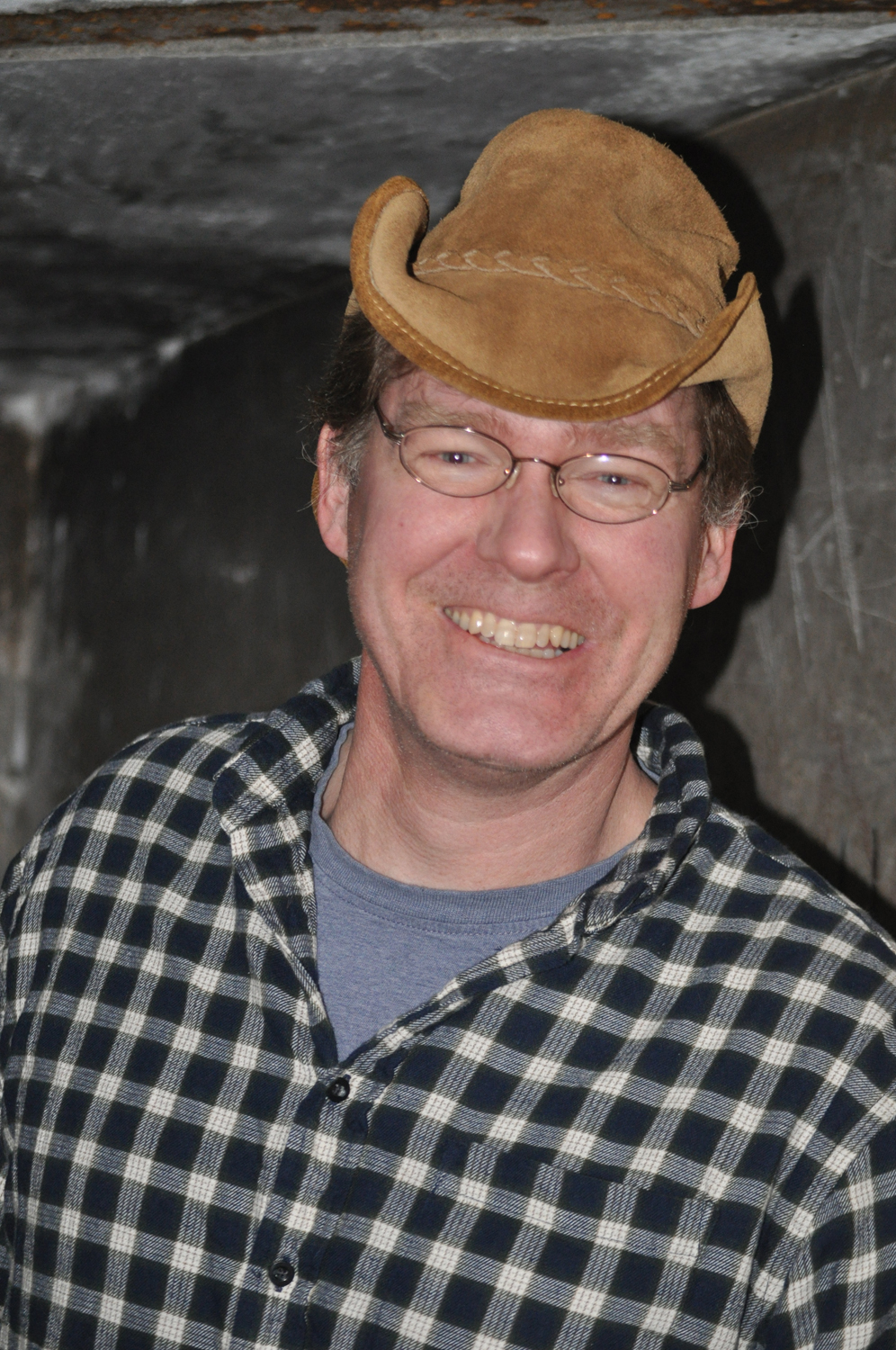
- Born: January 20, 1964 (age 62); Portland, Oregon, U.S.
- Education: BA English, Washington State University MFA screenwriting, University of Southern California
- Occupations: Writer, soldier
- Notable work: Operation Homecoming
- Military career
- Allegiance: United States
- Branch: United States Army
- Rank: Staff Sergeant
- Units: 361st Psychological Operations Company, 7th Psychological Operations Group
- Conflicts: Iraq War
- Website: jaxworx.com

Jack Lewis (born January 20, 1964) is an American author and military veteran.

Lewis was born in Portland, Oregon, and was a United States Army Staff Sergeant in the Iraq War in 2004 and 2005.

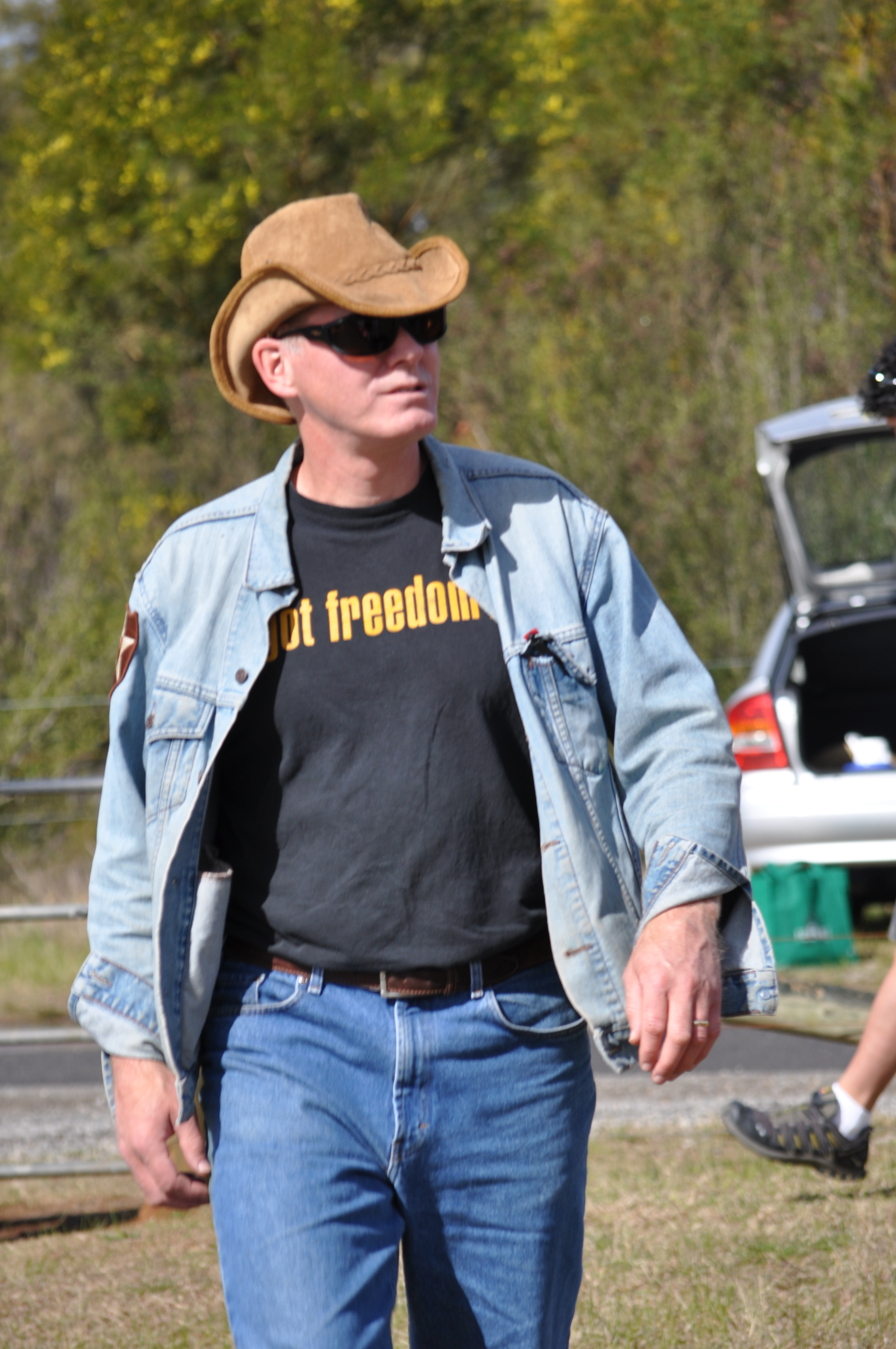

Lewis' writing was included in the book Operation Homecoming, and in the Oscar-nominated documentary Operation Homecoming: Writing the Wartime Experience in which he both appears, and is credited as a writer.

He has been a contributor to a number of publications including Crosscut.com, the Seattle Post-Intelligencer and Motorcyclist magazine where he writes the "Behind Bars" column.

== Bibliography ==
- Jack Lewis (contributor) (2006). Operation Homecoming: Iraq, Afghanistan, and the Home Front, in the Words of U.S. Troops and Their Families. Random House. ISBN 1400065623.
- Jack Lewis (2010). Coming and Going on Bikes: Essaying the Motorcycle. Litsam Inc. (Kindle edition). ASIN B0038YWRDI.
- Jack Lewis (contributor) (2010). The Devil Can Ride: The World's Best Motorcycle Writing. Motorbooks. ISBN 978-0760334775.
- Jack Lewis (2011). Nothing in Reserve: true stories, not war stories. Litsam Press. ISBN 978-1935878025.
- Jack Lewis (2014). Head Check: What it Feels Like to Ride Motorcycles. Litsam Press. ISBN 978-1935878087.

== Writing awards ==
- Midwest Book Review Reviewer's Choice (small press), Nothing in Reserve, January 2012
- Washington Post Best Nonfiction of 2006 (current events), Operation Homecoming
