= Angela Predhomme =

American singer-songwriter

Angela Marie Predhomme (born September 9, 1967) is an American singer-songwriter and music producer. Her first album, Angela Predhomme, was released in 2008, and she has since released four more independent albums: Don't Wonder, Let It Fall, Will, and her most recent, Love. Predhomme also released a holiday EP in 2017 called Holidayolio.

Her songs first gained recognition from television, film and advertising placements, most notably through features on Lifetime TV's Dance Moms. with the songs "Epiphany" for JoJo Siwa's performance called "Faith Is All I Need", and the song "Let It Fall" for Daviana Fletcher's "Shades of Blue". Predhomme's song "So Easy" was featured in two major ad campaigns in Europe; first for ING Bank Śląski's mobile app, and later in a commercial for the Fiat 500 car. Her song "Christmas Time with You", co-written by Paul Robert Thomas, is featured in the opening scenes of the Hallmark film, Christmas on Honeysuckle Lane. Predhomme's song "This Might Be Good" plays at the end of the film A Wedding Most Strange during the closing credits. Her songs are also heard in the background of many popular television shows, including The Voice, Switched at Birth, Pawn Stars, Here Comes Honey Boo Boo, What Not to Wear, and the America in Primetime series by Ron Howard.

Her song 'Living in a Love Song' has gained a cult following due to its inclusion on a playlist used by Hawes & Curtis in all their stores from 2017 through to 2020

== Accolades ==
Songs written and performed by Predhomme have earned recognition in multiple national song contests. Her song "Always OK" (2019) ranked as a semi-finalist in the Song of the Year songwriting competition, and songs "Extra Day", "My New Favorite Song" and "This Might Be Good" were named finalists by Song of the Year. In addition, she was invited to New York to present as a finalist in an advertising music contest "The Sellout" during the industry event, Advertising Week.

== Education ==
Predhomme received a B.S. degree from Eastern Michigan University in social sciences, where she graduated summa cum laude. She also has a M.A. degree in TESOL, teaching English to speakers of other languages, from Eastern Michigan University. She taught upper-level academic ESL (English as a second language) classes at Michigan State University for several years. Her background in linguistics helped her to easily transition into vocal diction and lyric writing.

== Discography ==
- Angela Predhomme (2008)
- Don't Wonder (2011)
- Let It Fall (2013)
- So Easy (single) (2014)
- Will (2015)
- Hug (single) (2017)
- Holidayolio (EP) (2017)
- Sweet Delectable You (single) (2019)
- Love (2019)
