= Ballet Now =

2018 film directed by Steven Cantor

- Directed by: Steven Cantor
- Produced by: Paul Allen; Elisabeth Moss; Alex Blavatnik; Olga Blavatnik; Steven Cantor; Jamie Schutz; Jannat Gargi; Tiler Peck; Victoria Morris
- Starring: Tiler Peck
- Cinematography: Casey Regan
- Edited by: Anna Pinchuk
- Music by: BC Smith
- Production companies: Vulcan Productions; Stick Figure Studios
- Distributed by: Hulu
- Release dates: June 4, 2018 (SIFF); July 20, 2018
- Running time: 73 minutes
- Country: United States
- Language: English

Ballet Now is an American documentary film directed by Steven Cantor that premiered on July 20, 2018, on Hulu.

== Premise ==
Ballet Now provides "an unfiltered look into the world of ballet through the eyes of New York City Ballet’s prima ballerina Tiler Peck – the first woman to curate The Music Center’s famed Ballet NOW program in Los Angeles."

== Production ==
On October 12, 2017, it was announced that Hulu had greenlit a feature documentary from director Steven Cantor to be produced Paul Allen, Tiler Peck, and Elisabeth Moss and that it was already in production. Cantor and Jamie Schutz were expected to as co-producers. Production companies involved with the then-untitled film included Vulcan Productions and Stick Figure Productions.

== Release ==
=== Marketing ===
On June 1, 2018, Hulu released an exclusive clip from the film.

=== Premiere ===
On June 4, 2018, the film held its world premiere during the annual Seattle International Film Festival in Seattle, Washington.

== See also ==
- List of original programs distributed by Hulu
