= Pandora's Promise =

- Directed by: Robert Stone
- Edited by: Don Kleszy
- Music by: Gary Lionelli
- Release date: June 12, 2013
- Running time: 87 minutes
- Country: United States
- Language: English
- Box office: $66,680

Pandora's Promise is a 2013 documentary film about the nuclear power debate, directed by Robert Stone. Its central argument is that nuclear power, which still faces historical opposition from environmentalists, is a relatively safe and clean energy source that can help mitigate the serious problem of anthropogenic global warming.

The title is derived from the ancient Greek myth of Pandora, who released numerous evils into the world, yet as the movie's tagline recalls: "At the bottom of the box she found hope."

== People ==
The film features several notable individuals who were once vehemently opposed to nuclear power but who now speak in favor of it, including Stewart Brand, Gwyneth Cravens, Mark Lynas, Richard Rhodes and Michael Shellenberger.

Anti-nuclear advocate Helen Caldicott is questioned and along with Harvey Wasserman appears briefly at the beginning. (Note: The footage of Caldicott (first "Unidentified Female" in the CNN rush transcript, linked below) and Wasserman (first "Unidentified Male" in same) was taken at a post-Fukushima rally, some details of which were published in: Abby Luby (October 13, 2011). "Anti-Nuke Rallies Urge for Closure of Indian Point" (PDF). Westchester Guardian. Archived from the original (PDF) on January 13, 2014. In summary, about 300 people attended the protest on 1 October 2011 at Pier 95 in New York City's Hudson River Park, which called for closure of the Indian Point Energy Center. John Hall, Karl Grossman and others spoke as well. Video recordings of Caldicott's speech from the event have been posted online: Dr. Helen Caldicott speaks out at No Nuke Rally 2011 against Nuclear Reactors on YouTube. Closing Indian Point with Dr. Helen Caldicott, October 1, 2011 on YouTube. Why let dickheads run the world? Congress belong to you. on YouTube. (Also has Wasserman's speech at the end.)) Historical clips of Jane Fonda, Ralph Nader and Amory Lovins speaking are used.

Richard Branson is credited as an executive producer, as are Paul and Jody Allen, whose production company, Vulcan Productions, helped provide financial support. A total of $1.2 million (US) was raised to finance the film, "particularly through Impact Partners, which provides documentary financing from individual investors. Mr. Stone said the money came mainly from wealthy who have worked in Silicon Valley."

== Topics ==
Topics mentioned or discussed in the film include:

- dosimetry
  - background radiation
    - naturally occurring radioactive material
    - Guarapari, Brazil: monazite-bearing black sand beach
    - Radium Springs, New Mexico: radium-rich water
  - banana equivalent dose
  - dosimeter
  - tritium
- effects of global warming
- history of the anti-nuclear movement
- history of nuclear weapons
  - atomic bombings of Hiroshima and Nagasaki
  - Megatons to Megawatts Program
  - nuclear proliferation
  - nuclear weapons testing
- nuclear and radiation accidents
  - Three Mile Island accident
  - Chernobyl disaster
    - Chernobyl: Consequences of the Catastrophe for People and the Environment (publication)
  - Fukushima Daiichi nuclear disaster
- nuclear power in France
- nuclear power in the United States
  - Shoreham Nuclear Power Plant
  - Vermont Yankee Nuclear Power Plant
- nuclear reactors
  - generation III reactor
  - generation IV reactor
  - integral fast reactor
    - Experimental Breeder Reactor I
    - Experimental Breeder Reactor II
  - small modular reactor
  - thorium fuel cycle
  - traveling wave reactor
  - USS Nautilus (SSN-571)
    - Hyman G. Rickover

== Multimedia ==
Stock footage and movie clips are used throughout Pandora's Promise to enhance the narrative. Scenes are shown of a No Nukes concert (1979), Margaret Thatcher addressing the United Nations General Assembly (1989), (Note: Margaret Thatcher's "Speech to United Nations General Assembly (Global Environment)". November 8, 1989.) and from the drafting of the Kyoto Protocol (1997). Movie/TV sources include: A Is for Atom (1953), Our Friend the Atom (1957), The China Syndrome (1979), and The Simpsons (1991).

The film poster depicts a piece of metallic enriched uranium ("actual size" as printed) with the caption "What if this cube could power your entire life?"

== Release ==
In January 2013 it was shown at the 2013 Sundance Film Festival. In March 2013 it was shown at the True/False Film Festival. In June 2013 it won the Sheffield Doc/Fest Green Award for best addressing environmental challenges.

In April 2013, it was announced that CNN Films had obtained the US television rights to Pandora's Promise; it was shown on CNN in the US on November 7, 2013, and seen by 345,000 viewers. It was released on Region 2 DVD in December 2013. A DVD via Alive Mind Cinema was announced for 24 June 2014. It is also available via various digital distribution services.

== Reactions ==
Reactions to the film were generally positive, albeit with loud criticism from some quarters; e.g.:

- Kennette Benedict from the Bulletin of the Atomic Scientists states: "Nuclear power may indeed end up being part of the energy mix that leads to both a more stable climate and adequate livelihoods around the world. But the challenges posed by nuclear power – like the risk of weapons proliferation and reactor accidents, and the need to securely store radioactive used fuel for many generations – are not adequately addressed in the film."
- Manohla Dargis wrote a somewhat critical review.
- Friends of the Earth Australia, an environmental organization, has (among other groups) denounced the movie as "propaganda".
- Owen Gleiberman lauded it as "radically sane".
- Robert F. Kennedy, Jr. characterized it as an "elaborate hoax" and a "big lie".
- Edwin Lyman of the Union of Concerned Scientists was critical of various "less-than-half truths".
- Michael Moore discussed the film (among other topics) with director Robert Stone in front of an audience at the Traverse City Film Festival in July 2013.
- John Quiggin comments that Pandora's Promise presents the environmental rationale for nuclear power, but that reviving nuclear power debates is a distraction, and the main problem with the nuclear option is that it is not economically viable. Quiggin says that we need more energy efficiency and more renewable energy commercialization.
- David Ropeik found it praiseworthy.
- Christine Todd Whitman described it as "a very important, impactful film that should be seen by as wide an audience as possible."
- Terry Tempest Williams stated "this film's strength was not that it changed my mind, which it did not, but that it expanded it".
- Eric Zorn noted shortcomings, but hailed it as "the most important movie about the environment since An Inconvenient Truth".

== See also ==
- Energy policy in the United States
- List of films about nuclear issues
- List of books about nuclear issues
- List of pro-nuclear environmentalists
  - James Hansen (Note: James Hansen on nuclear power on YouTube (Pandora's Promise's channel))
  - Stephen Tindale (Note: Former Greenpeace/UK Executive Director Stephen Tindale on nuclear power and renewable energy on YouTube (Pandora's Promise's channel))
- Nuclear engineering
- Nuclear renaissance
- World energy consumption
