= Fayve =

Former digital entertainment distribution service

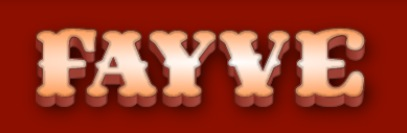
- Founded: 2011
- Headquarters: Seattle, Washington, U.S.
- Owner: Paul G. Allen
- Parent: Vulcan Technologies, LLC
- Website: www.fayve.com

Fayve was a digital entertainment distribution service founded and developed by Vulcan Technologies, LLC. It was launched on November 8, 2012, and ran as an app on iOS for iPad owners, on Google Play for Android Tablets and on Amazon for Kindle tablets. The app was a movie and TV show discovery tool that aggregated content from Netflix, Hulu, Hulu Plus, Amazon Prime, Amazon Instant, Redbox, YouTube, VUDU, Crackle, iTunes, XFINITY, IndieFlix and Fandango into one library. It allowed users with accounts from those service providers to stream content from a single interface.

Support for Fayve ended on November 16, 2014, and the app was removed from the app stores after a major streaming provider discontinued its data feed.

Fayve was originally created for, and used by, Paul G. Allen, founder of Fayve's parent company, Vulcan, Inc., to navigate “his own giant collection of films and movies.” It was re-tooled and commercialized because of its “broader market appeal.” According to CNET, the name Fayve is both a reference to “favorites” and a homage to Allen's mother, Faye, who died in 2012.

== Format ==
Fayve uses a rotating carousel to display content, allowing users to sort by genre, topics or content providers. Once a user taps on a title on the carousel, a details page with more information on that show or movie presents itself, which includes cast and crew, similar shows, photos from the show or movie, and friends that have also "liked it" on Facebook. Most of the actions within the title page “pivot” to another page when clicked on, such as a cast member, or it will suggest similar titles to the one you are viewing.

Many titles pages also include Rotten Tomatoes reviews and one or more theatrical trailers, ranging from 30-seconds to 2-minutes.

Fayve title page for Pulp Fiction.

Displayed below the cover art of the movie or TV show are the service providers the title is available on. Tapping on the logo of the content provider will enable the user to stream the title instantly. The app also allows the user to use “service filters” to ignore service providers a user does not have access to.

Celebrities also have their own home pages, which includes biographies, photos, “mediography” (which encompasses movie and TV credits).

Users are given the opportunity to rate TV shows, movies and individual celebrities on a one-star to five-star scale. Developers of Fayve say this process helps deliver higher quality recommendations. Users are given the option to post their ratings and reviews to other social media providers, including Facebook and Twitter.

== Reception ==
Fayve has received positive reviews, with special attention to its use of the carousel presentation and interface. Fayve received 4-stars in the CNET Editors' Review, which said "Fayve for iPad is possibly the best movie browsing tool available." CNET's Jason Parker called it "one of six iOS apps you need right now" while referencing the 2012 holiday season. TWiT Network's Sarah Lane gave Fayve her App Cap Award, and reported getting recommendations based on the programs she had personally rated.

Lifehacker described the Fayve carousel as “almost addictive. … While there are several other similar entertainment discovery apps, including previously mentioned Fanhattan, Fayve stands out for its unique interface. It's just fun to use.” The Next Web described Fayve as “a really convenient tool for movie buffs.”
