= Me & Isaac Newton =

- DVD cover
- Directed by: Michael Apted
- Produced by: Jody Allen; Eileen Gregory; Paul G. Allen
- Starring: Paul G. Allen
- Cinematography: Maryse Alberti
- Edited by: Susanne Rostock
- Music by: Patrick Seymour
- Production company: Clear Blue Sky Productions
- Distributed by: First Look International (USA)
- Release date: 1999
- Country: United States
- Language: English
- Budget: $1.5 million
- Box office: $32,269

Me & Isaac Newton is a 1999 documentary directed by Michael Apted and produced by Clear Blue Sky Productions.

== Synopsis ==
With a lightly humorous approach, the film explores human advances in the field of sciences. Both Apted and Paul G. Allen, director and film financer respectively, deploy segments of interviews with several scientists and researchers about their views in science, in the same way they previously did with arts in the documentary Inspirations.

The film features Gertrude Elion, Ashok Gadgil, Michio Kaku, Maja Matarić, Steven Pinker, Karol Sikora, and Patricia Wright.

== Release and box office ==
Me & Isaac Newton is estimated to have made $32,269 on an estimated budget of $1,500,000. In its opening weekend, the documentary brought in $6,382.

On September 17, 1999, the documentary premiered at the Toronto International Film Festival.

== Critical reception ==
Me & Isaac Newton had a generally positive reception. It was given a four out of five by the movie critic Stephen Holden of the New York Times.

Mick LaSalle of SFGate described the film as, "elegant and rather even-tempered."

The documentary did not only receive praise. Maria Garcia, of Film Journal, commented on the "unnatural structuring," which she believed kept the film from informing the audience of the different scientists' accomplishments and individual personalities. Due to Apted's editing, she found the documentary to be too fast-paced and stylized into a narrative structure Apted preferred.
