= America in Primetime =

- Genre: Documentary
- Directed by: Lloyd Kramer
- Composer: Peter Nashel
- Country of origin: United States
- Original language: English
- No. of seasons: 1
- No. of episodes: 4

Production
- Executive producers: Tom Yellin; Lloyd Kramer
- Producers: Susan Schaefer; Linda Hirsch; Joanna Cohen (assoc.); Mark Kachelries (assoc.)
- Cinematography: Logan Schneider
- Editors: Scott Chestnut & Jon Vesey
- Running time: 54 minutes
- Production company: The Documentary Group

Original release
- Network: Public Broadcasting Service (US); BBC Two (UK)
- Release: October 30 – November 20, 2011

America in Primetime is a 2011 four-part documentary series, focusing on television in the United States. Originally produced for and broadcast by the Public Broadcasting Service (PBS), the series is a production by The Documentary Group, in collaboration with the Academy of Television Arts & Sciences Foundation and WETA-TV. The rights to the series were purchased by the United Kingdom's British Broadcasting Corporation (BBC) in 2013. The episodes were re-edited and clips of Alan Yentob introducing different segments, shot on location in different areas of America, were added. Exploring both old and new television series, each episode centers on the evolution of certain character archetypes – such as female and male archetypes, misfits, and heroes – in primetime TV. The series features interviews with a wide variety of influential people in television, including actors, creators, writers and executive producers, talking about their own shows and others. The documentary features a lot of footage from the programs discussed.

== Episodes ==
No.	Title	Original release date
1	"Independent Woman"	October 30, 2011
Far removed from the model housewife of yesterday, women today on TV care less about pleasing others, and more about being true to themselves.
2	"Man of the House"	November 6, 2011
In 1950s television, the man of the house was king of his castle, but then he began losing control. Was it all an illusion to begin with?
3	"The Misfit"	November 13, 2011
Whether they are oddballs, losers, or just plain weird, misfit characters have grown beyond comic stereotypes and are taking center stage with a vengeance, refusing to apologize for who they are.
4	"The Crusader"	November 20, 2011
Heroes today are complex. Their stories are told with increasing humanity, depicting characters who confront almost impossible choices as they fight evil in a world where the line between right and wrong is often blurred.

== Release and reception ==
America in Primetime was met with favourable reviews. David Bianculli, a regular contributor to the NPR radio talk show Fresh Air, lauded the series, and called it "the smartest TV show about television I've seen in about 20 years." In the Houston Chronicle, television writer David Wiegend praised the fact that viewers can not only learn about the history of television, but about the changes in American culture as well.

Episodes of America in Primetime originally aired in the United States on four consecutive Sundays in late 2011, on PBS. The episodes were also made available on the PBS Video website. The series was released on DVD and Blu-ray Disc on January 17, 2012, and features bonus interviews.

The BBC bought the UK rights to the documentary and aired it in spring 2013 under the title The United States of Television: America in Primetime. The series was re-edited to a 58-minute run time and hosted by Alan Yentob and broadcast on BBC Two from 20 April 2013. They were shown in a different order to the original US transmission: Man of the House; The Misfit; The Independent Woman; The Crusader.
