= Jody Allen =

American businesswoman and sports team owner (born 1959)

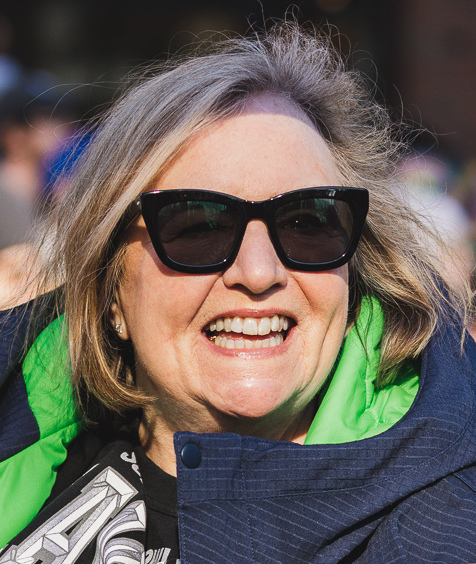
- Allen in 2026
- Born: Jo Lynn Allen; February 3, 1959 (age 67); Seattle, Washington, U.S.
- Other names: Jody Patton, Jo Lynn Patton, Jo Allen, Jody Allen Patton, Jo Allen Patton
- Education: Whitman College
- Occupations: Vice-chair of First & Goal Inc. Co-founder of Vulcan Inc. President of Vulcan Productions
- Spouse: Brian Patton (m. 1988; div. 2009)
- Children: 3
- Relatives: Paul Allen (brother)

Jo Lynn "Jody" Allen (born February 3, 1959) is an American businesswoman, entrepreneur, and philanthropist. She is the younger sister of Microsoft co-founder Paul Allen, and served as the chief executive officer of his investment and project management company, Vulcan Inc., from its founding in 1986 until 2015. She is also the co-founder and president of the Paul G. Allen Family Foundation.

Following the death of her brother in October 2018, Allen was named executor and trustee of his estate, pursuant to his instructions, giving her responsibility for overseeing the execution of his will and settling his affairs with tax authorities and parties with an interest in his projects. Among some of the properties she took control of upon his death were the Seattle Seahawks of the National Football League (NFL), the Octopus super-yacht, and the Portland Trail Blazers of the National Basketball Association (NBA), along with minority ownership of the Seattle Sounders FC of Major League Soccer (MLS).

== Early life and education ==
Allen was born in Seattle, Washington, on February 3, 1959, the daughter of schoolteacher Edna Faye (née Gardner) Allen and Kenneth Sam Allen, an associate director of the University of Washington Libraries. Her older brother Paul went on to become co-founder of Microsoft Corporation. She grew up in Seattle's Wedgwood neighborhood and graduated from Lakeside School in 1975. She studied drama at Whitman College in Walla Walla, Washington, and was a member of the class of 1980.

== Career ==
In 1986, Allen co-founded Vulcan Inc. with her brother to manage their family's business and charitable endeavors. Vulcan's former chief financial officer described her as being "responsible for having the trains run on time" and said she had "a particular passion for real estate development, building things in general."

She currently serves as vice-chair of First & Goal Inc., which oversees operations of the Seattle Seahawks. She was involved in negotiating the public-private partnership that led to the construction of Lumen Field in Seattle, and was an adviser to her brother when he first considered buying the Seahawks. In 1997, a Seattle reporter wrote: "Jody Patton thought buying the Seahawks was a great idea; thus was born Allen's efforts to acquire the team and build a new football stadium."

During her career Allen also supervised construction of the Moda Center in Portland, Oregon, renovation of the Seattle Cinerama, and also helped bring the EMP Museum (now the Museum of Pop Culture or MoPOP) to Seattle. She is also president of Vulcan Productions, a company that produces films, digital programs, and outreach initiatives, and has produced or executive-produced more than a dozen documentaries and feature films. In 2013, she signed on as a backer of two documentaries, the Richard E. Robbins-directed film Girl Rising and the nuclear power documentary Pandora's Promise.

On July 11, 2026, Allen announced her acceptance to sell her ownership of the Seahawks for $9.612 billion from Neeru Khosla and her investment group. Sale of Allen's ownership of the team was finalized on September 3, 2026.

== Controversies ==
In 2013, five of her former security guards accused her of sexual harassment, and extensive unethical activity, including bribing customs officials to smuggle animal bones out of Africa and Antarctica. The lawsuits were eventually settled out of court.

== Philanthropy ==
Allen co-founded the Paul G. Allen Family Foundation in 1990. Since then, the foundation has given more than $1 billion in grants to over 1,400 nonprofit organizations.

Allen is the president of the board of trustees of the Museum of Pop Culture, a nonprofit museum dedicated to pop culture and music. The Seattle Times credited Allen with helping her brother make the museum a reality: "Although Allen gets most of the credit...it is the brainchild of both these close siblings. Allen provided the money and inspiration; Patton, as executive director, is largely responsible for the vision that made it happen."

With her brother, Allen co-founded the Seattle-based non-profit organization Allen Institute for Brain Science in 2003, of which she serves as chairman of the board. The Institute provides free online public resources to scientists around the world. Other boards on which she has served include those of the Seahawks Charitable Foundation, ArtsFund, the Theatre Communications Group, the University of Washington Foundation, the Museum of Glass, the Los Angeles Film Festival and the Oregon Shakespeare Festival.

== Personal life ==
Allen has three children with Brian Patton, whom she divorced in 2009 after 21 years of marriage. Allen's ex-husband is a golf-course manager. She was known as Jody Patton, Jody Allen Patton and Jo Allen Patton while married.

She is a member of the Royal Canadian Geographical Society and the Explorers Club.

As of 2009, Allen lives on Mercer Island, Washington.

== Filmography ==
=== Executive producer ===
- Men with Guns (1997)
- The Luzhin Defence (2000)
- The Safety of Objects (2001)
- The Soul of a Man (2003)
- The Blues (2003)
- Lightning in a Bottle (2004)
- Hard Candy (2005)
- American Masters: No Direction Home: Bob Dylan (2005)
- Bickford Shmeckler's Cool Ideas (2006)
- Where God Left His Shoes (2007)
- Girl Rising (2013)
- Pandora's Promise (2013)
- We The Economy (2014)
- Hunger Ward (2020)

=== Producer ===
- Inspirations (1997)
- Me & Isaac Newton (1999)
- Titus (1999)
- Coastlines (2002)
- Far from Heaven (2002)

Sporting positions
Preceded by Paul Allen	Seattle Seahawks principal owner 2018–2026	Succeeded by Neeru Khosla
Preceded by Paul Allen	Portland Trail Blazers principal owner 2018–2026	Succeeded by Thomas Dundon
