= Coastlines (film) =

- Poster.
- Directed by: Victor Nuñez
- Written by: Victor Nuñez
- Produced by: Jody Allen; Jonathan Sehring; Victor Nuñez
- Starring: Timothy Olyphant; Josh Brolin; Sarah Wynter
- Cinematography: Virgil Mirano
- Edited by: Victor Nuñez
- Music by: Charles Engstrom
- Production companies: Clear Blue Sky Productions; Fly Over L.C.
- Distributed by: IFC Films
- Release date: 2002
- Running time: 110 minutes
- Country: United States
- Language: English

Coastlines is a 2002 dramatic film written and directed by Victor Nuñez. It is the third of three films by Nuñez set in the Florida Panhandle after Ruby in Paradise (1993) and Ulee's Gold (1997). The film made its debut at the 2002 Sundance Film Festival but was not released until 2006 as it could not find a distributor, when the American rights were officially acquired by IFC Films.

== Plot ==
Sonny Mann (Timothy Olyphant) is released early from prison and returns home to the Florida Panhandle and tries to collect $200,000 owed to him by his former cohorts, Fred Vance (William Forsythe) and his nephew Eddie (Josh Lucas). He enters into a love triangle with best friend Dave Lockhart (Josh Brolin), a sheriff, and his wife, Ann Lockhart (Sarah Wynter).

== Cast ==
- Timothy Olyphant as Sonny Mann
- Josh Brolin as Sheriff Dave Lockhart
- Sarah Wynter as Ann Lockhart
- Scott Wilson as Pa Mann
- Angela Bettis as Effie Bender
- Josh Lucas as Eddie Vance
- Robert Wisdom as Bob Johnson
- Daniel von Bargen as Sheriff Tate
- Blake Lindsley as Redhead in Bar
- Robert Glaudini as Henry
- Edwin Hodge as Roy
- Abigail Mavity as Rachel Lockhart
- Caity Elizabeth as Trish Lockhart
- Steven Gilborn as Doctor
- Karen S. Gregan as Lady in Red
- Freda Foh Shen as Nurse
- William Forsythe as Fred Vance
- Gregory R. Jones as Ambulance Attendant
- Jennie Stringfellow as Fred Vance's Secretary
- Bob Martin as Preacher
- Rachel Plotkin as Blonde in Bar
- Jay S. Pearson as Parametic
- Alexa Davalos as Eddie Vance's girlfriend (uncredited)
- Aaron Stephens as Patrick (uncredited)
