= Operation Homecoming: Writing the Wartime Experience =

2007 documentary film by Richard E. Robbins

- Film cover
- Directed by: Richard E. Robbins
- Produced by: Richard E. Robbins; Tom Yellin
- Music by: Ben Decter
- Distributed by: The Documentary Group
- Release date: February 9, 2007
- Running time: 81 minutes
- Country: United States
- Language: English

Operation Homecoming: Writing the Wartime Experience is a 2007 American documentary film directed by Richard E. Robbins, which portrays the lives and experiences of American combat soldiers who have been to the Iraq and Afghanistan wars.

== Production ==
The film is based on a collection of writings by veterans who have served in Iraq and Afghanistan wars, combined with news footage and photographs. These writings include journals, letters, poetry and essays, which were gathered by National Endowment for the Arts and previously published in the anthology Operation Homecoming: Iraq, Afghanistan, and the Home Front, in the Words of U.S. Troops and Their Families, edited by the bestselling author Andrew Carroll and initially released in hardcover by Random House and then in softcover, with additional material, by University of Chicago Press. The text is read by actors Beau Bridges, Robert Duvall, Aaron Eckhart, Chris Gorham, Justin Kirk, John Krasinski, Josh Lucas, and Blair Underwood, and poet Brian Turner. The film also consists of commentaries and interviews with literary authors such as Tobias Wolff, Tim O'Brien, Anthony Swofford, Paul Fussell and James Salter.

== Release ==
In 2007, the film was given theatrical release in the United States on September 9 and aired on Public Broadcasting Service's "America at the Crossroads" series.

== Reception ==
=== Box office ===
The film grossed $4,500 in its opening weekend and ranked 76th for the weekend, and went on to gross a total of $6,700 domestically.

=== Critical reaction ===
The documentary was given mostly positive reviews by critics. Operation Homecoming: Writing the Wartime Experience has an approval rating of 90% on review aggregator website Rotten Tomatoes, based on 21 reviews, and an average rating of 7.60/10. Metacritic reported the film had an average score of 71 out of 100, based on 9 reviews, presenting "generally favorable reviews"

The film was considered "eloquent and moving", and was rated A− by Owen Gleiberman of Entertainment Weekly, who added that the documentary brought the viewers "closer to the emotions (principally boredom and terror) of the soldiers fighting in Iraq and Afghanistan than perhaps any previous examination." Janice Page of The Boston Globe also agreed that "no [other] work has brought viewers deeper inside the psychology of war". The Los Angeles Times's Mark Olsen, however, gave a more critical review, commenting that the film does "more of a disservice to the writings than aid in any greater understanding of their emotional meaning."

=== Nominations and awards ===
The documentary received a nomination for Best Documentary Feature at the 80th Academy Awards, as well as a nomination for Best Feature Documentary films of the year by the International Documentary Association. Operation homecoming also received the Special Jury Award for "Innovative Documentary Storytelling" at Florida Film Festival in 2007.

For this documentary, director Richard E. Robbins was nominated for the 2007 Directors Guild of America Awards.
