= Tom Yellin =

American television and film producer (born 1953)

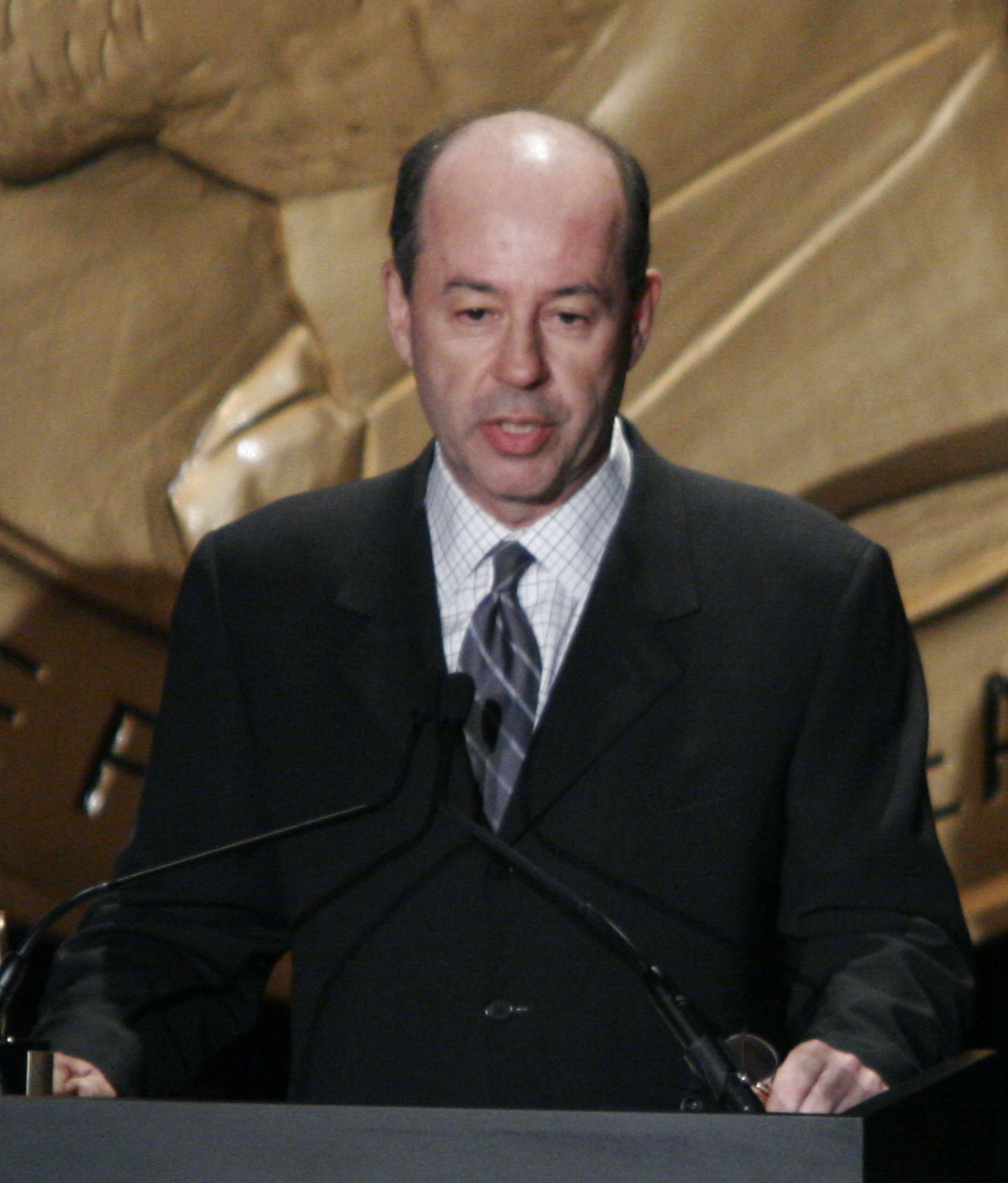
- Tom Yellin at the 66th Annual Peabody Awards
- Born: 1953 (age 72–73)
- Occupations: Television producer; film producer
- Years active: 1991–present

Tom Yellin (born 1953) is an American television and film producer. He has mostly worked on various television films and documentaries.

== Biography ==
Born in 1953, Yellin started his career as a producer at ABC News. He produced various news shows and television series, which have won various awards, including the Peabody, Emmy, Gabriel, George Polk and Alfred I. duPont–Columbia University awards. In 2002, he co-founded PJ Productions, an American television production company; several years later, he co-founded The Documentary Group, an independent production company.

Yellin produced documentaries such as Operation Homecoming: Writing the Wartime Experience (2007) Girl Rising (2013), and America in Primetime (2011). In 2015, he produced documentary Cartel Land which received positive reception, and was nominated for numerous awards, including an Academy Award for Best Documentary Feature and BAFTA Award for Best Documentary.
