= Lloyd Kramer =

American filmmaker

Lloyd Kramer is an American filmmaker known for directing made-for-TV films such as The Five People You Meet in Heaven.

== Television filmography ==
=== As director ===
- Nine (1992, documentary)
- ABC Afterschool Specials (1993, 1 episode, "Girlfriend")
- Before Women Had Wings (1997)
- David and Lisa (1998)
- All-American Girl: The Mary Kay Letourneau Story (2000)
- Amy & Isabelle (2001)
- Report from Ground Zero (2002)
- The Five People You Meet in Heaven (2004)
- Oprah Winfrey Presents: Mitch Albom's For One More Day (2007)
- America in Primetime (2011, 4 episodes, also produced)
- Liz & Dick (2012)
