= Paul Allen =

American businessman (1953–2018)

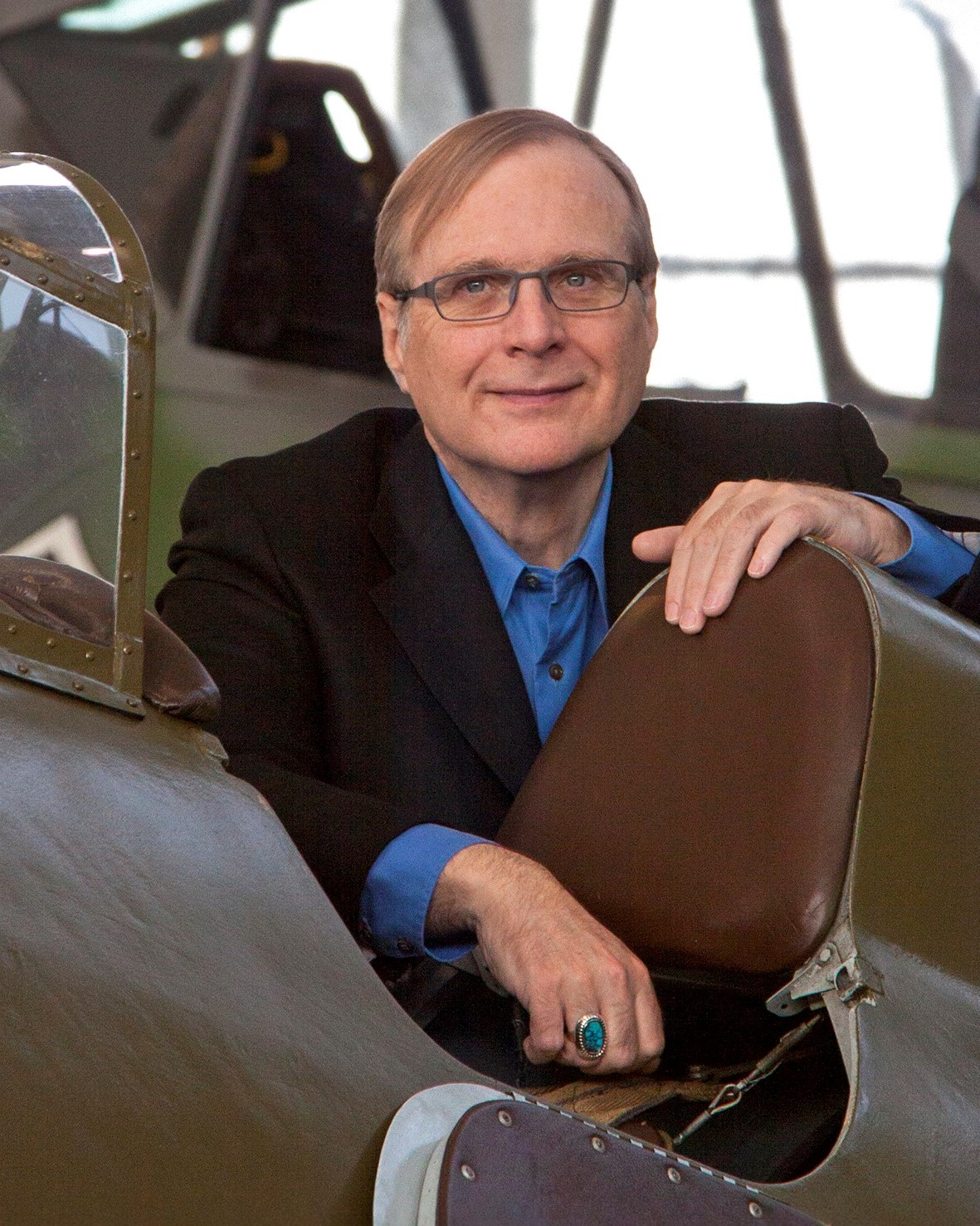
- Allen at the Flying Heritage Collection in 2013
- Born: Paul Gardner Allen; January 21, 1953; Seattle, Washington, U.S.
- Died: October 15, 2018 (aged 65); Seattle, Washington, U.S.
- Education: Washington State University (dropped out)
- Occupations: Businessman; computer programmer; researcher; film producer; explorer; sports executive; investor; author; philanthropist
- Years active: 1972–2018
- Known for: Pioneer of the personal computer revolution with Bill Gates; Co-founding of Microsoft
- Title: See list: Chairman and co-founder of Vulcan Inc.; Owner of Seattle Seahawks and Portland Trail Blazers; Part-owner of Seattle Sounders FC; Founder of Allen Institute for Brain Science; Founder of Allen Institute for Cell Science; Founder of Allen Institute for Artificial Intelligence; Founder of Apex Learning; Founder of Stratolaunch Systems; Co-founder of Mojave Aerospace Ventures; Strategy advisor of Microsoft
- Relatives: Jody Allen (sister)
- Awards: Super Bowl XLVIII champion 2016 MLS Cup champion
- Website: paulallen.com

Paul Gardner Allen (January 21, 1953 – October 15, 2018) was an American businessman, computer programmer, and investor. He co-founded Microsoft Corporation with his childhood friend Bill Gates in 1975, which was followed by the microcomputer revolution of the 1970s and 1980s. Allen was ranked as one of the richest people in American history by Forbes, with an estimated net worth of $20.3 billion at the time of his death in October 2018.

Allen quit day-to-day work at Microsoft in early 1983 after a Hodgkin lymphoma diagnosis, remaining on its board as vice-chairman. He and his sister, Jody Allen, founded Vulcan Inc. in 1986, a privately held company that managed his business and philanthropic efforts. At the time of his death, he had a multi-billion dollar investment portfolio, including technology and media companies, scientific research, real estate holdings, private space flight ventures and stakes in other sectors. He owned the Seattle Seahawks of the National Football League and the Portland Trail Blazers of the National Basketball Association, and was part-owner of the Seattle Sounders FC of Major League Soccer. Under the Allen Estate's helm, the Seahawks won Super Bowl XLVIII, LX, and made it to two other Super Bowls (XLIX, XL). In 2000 he resigned from his position on Microsoft's board and assumed the post of senior strategy advisor to the company's management team.

Allen founded the Allen Institutes for Brain Science, Artificial Intelligence, and Cell Science, as well as companies like Stratolaunch Systems and Apex Learning. He gave more than $2 billion to causes such as education, wildlife and environmental conservation, the arts, healthcare and community services. In 2004, he funded the first crewed private spaceplane with SpaceShipOne. He received numerous awards and honors and was listed among the Time 100 Most Influential People in the World in 2007 and 2008. He also discovered the wrecks of various famous warships, like the Japanese battleship Musashi and USS Indianapolis.

Allen was diagnosed with non-Hodgkin lymphoma in 2009. He died of septic shock related to cancer on October 15, 2018, at the age of 65. Shortly after his death, in April 2019, the Allen-funded Stratolaunch first flew and became the largest aircraft in history by wingspan.

== Early life ==
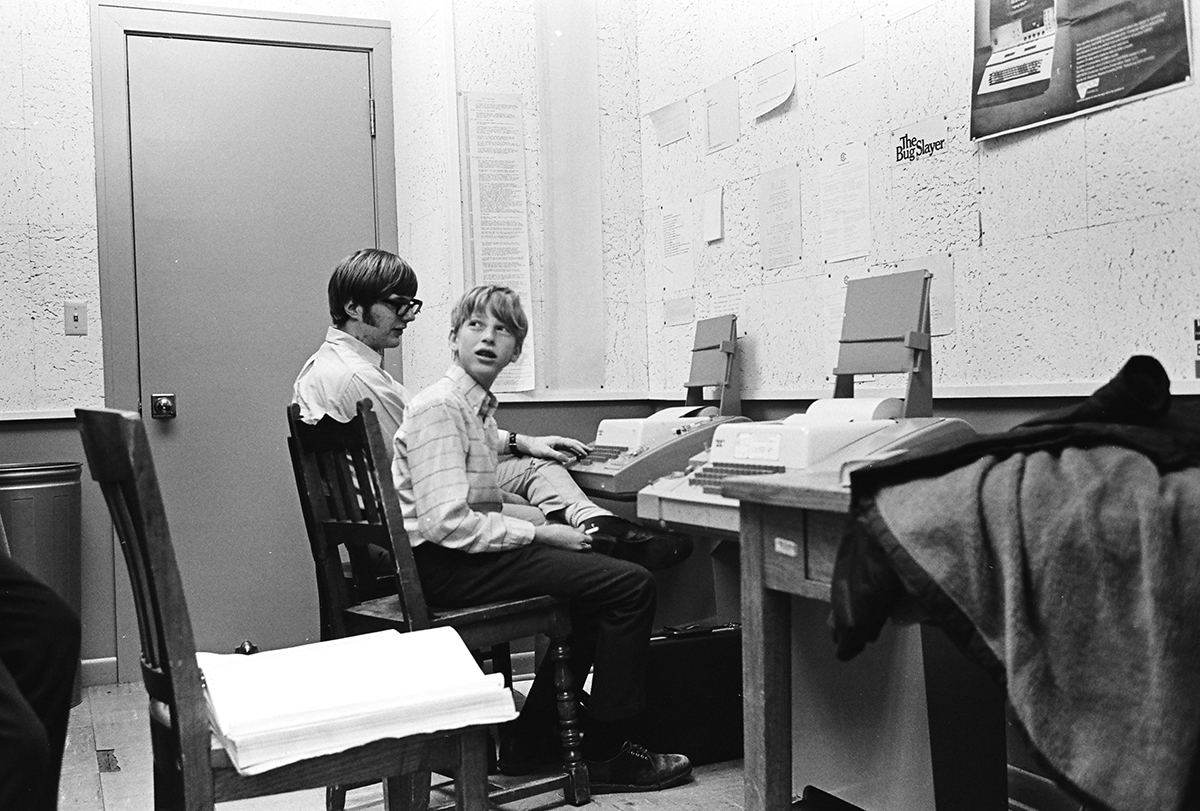
Allen (left) with Bill Gates at Lakeside School in 1970

Allen was born on January 21, 1953, in Seattle, Washington, to Kenneth Sam Allen (a librarian) and Edna Faye (née Gardner) Allen (a fourth-grade teacher). From 1965 to 1971 he attended Lakeside School, a private school in Seattle where he befriended Bill Gates, with whom he shared an enthusiasm for computers. They used Lakeside's Teletype terminals to develop their programming skills on several time-sharing computer systems. They also used the laboratory of the Computer Science Department of the University of Washington for personal research and computer programming until they were banned in 1971 for abusing their privileges.

Gates and Allen joined with Ric Weiland and Gates' childhood best friend and first collaborator, Kent Evans, to form the Lakeside Programming Club and find bugs in Computer Center Corporation's software, in exchange for extra computer time. In 1972, after Evans' sudden death in a mountain climbing accident, Gates turned to Allen for help finishing an automated class scheduling system for Lakeside. They then formed Traf-O-Data to make traffic counters based on the Intel 8008 processor. According to Allen, he and Gates would go dumpster diving during their teenage years for computer program code.

Allen achieved a perfect SAT score of 1600 and went to Washington State University, where he joined the Phi Kappa Theta fraternity. He dropped out of college after two years to work as a programmer for Honeywell in Boston near Harvard University where Gates was enrolled. Allen convinced Gates to drop out of Harvard in order to focus on Microsoft.

== Microsoft ==
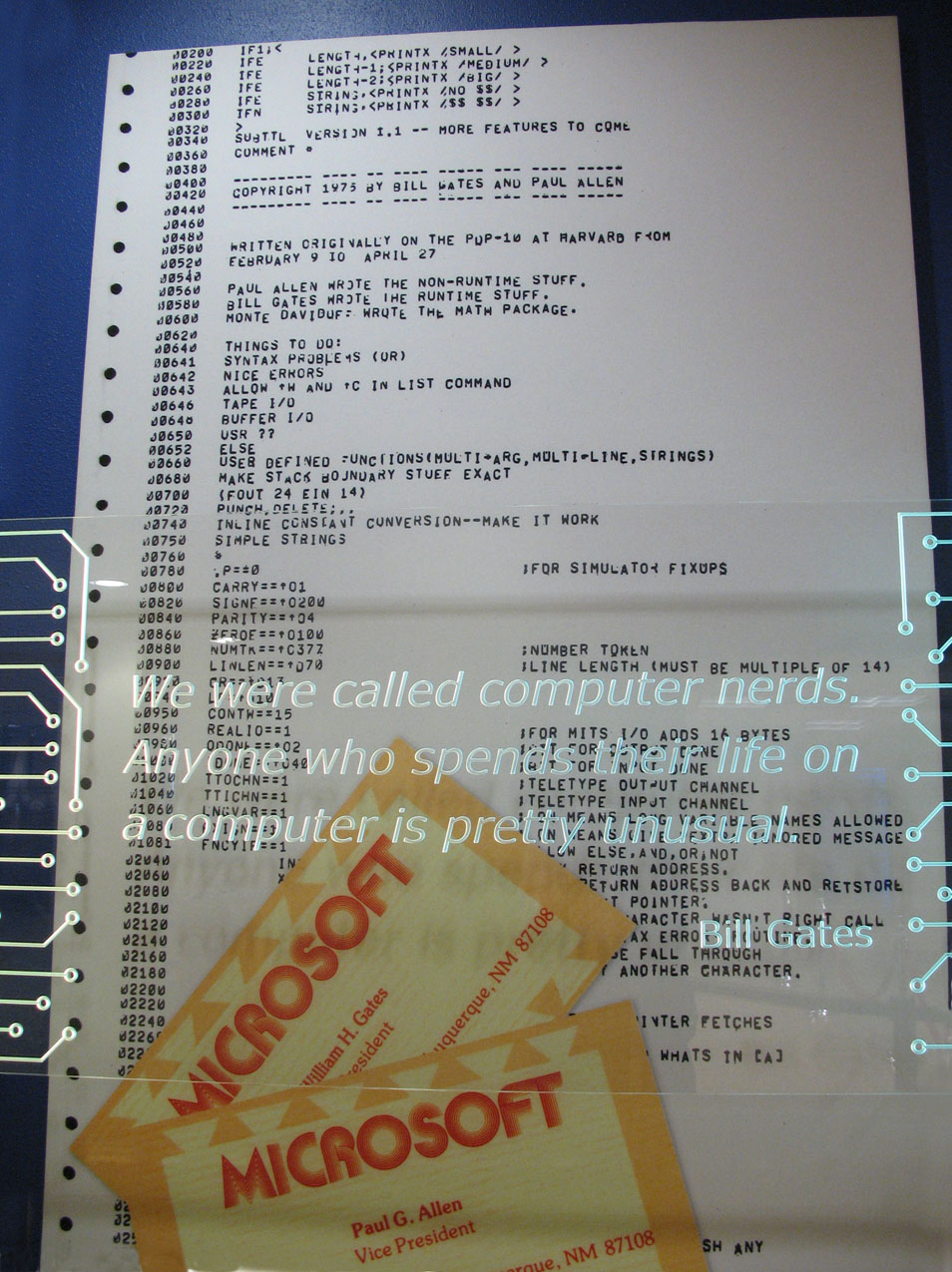
The title page of the assembly language code that produced Altair BASIC, developed by Allen, Gates, and Monte Davidoff, with two early Microsoft business cards showing Gates as president and Allen as vice president

Allen and Gates formed Microsoft in 1975 in Albuquerque, New Mexico, and began marketing a BASIC programming language interpreter, with their first employee being high school friend and collaborator Ric Weiland. Allen came up with the name of "Micro-Soft", a combination of "microcomputer" and "software".

Microsoft committed to delivering a disk operating system (DOS) to IBM for the original IBM PC in 1980, although they had not yet developed one, and Allen spearheaded a deal for Microsoft to purchase QDOS (Quick and Dirty Operating System) written by Tim Paterson who was employed at Seattle Computer Products. As a result of this transaction, Microsoft secured a contract to supply the DOS that ran on IBM's PC line, which opened the door to Allen's and Gates' wealth and success.

The company restructured on June 25, 1981, to become an incorporated business in its home state of Washington (with a further change of its name to "Microsoft Corporation, Inc."). As part of the restructuring, Gates became president of the company and chairman of the board, and Allen became executive vice president and vice chairman. The relationship between Allen and Gates became strained as they argued even over small things. Allen effectively left Microsoft in 1982 after being diagnosed with Hodgkin's lymphoma, though he remained on the board of directors as vice chairman. Gates reportedly asked Allen to give him some of his shares to compensate for the higher amount of work that Gates was doing. According to Allen, Gates said that he "did almost everything on BASIC" and the company should be split 60–40 in his favor. Allen agreed to this arrangement, which Gates later renegotiated to 64–36. In 1983, Gates tried to buy Allen out at $5 per share, but Allen refused and left the company with his shares intact; this made him a billionaire when Microsoft went public, with 25.2% ownership of the company. Gates later repaired his relationship with Allen, and the two men donated $2.2 million to their childhood school Lakeside in 1986. They remained friends for the rest of Allen's life.

Allen resigned from his position on the Microsoft board of directors on November 9, 2000, but he remained as a senior strategy advisor to the company's executives. In January 2014, he still held 100 million shares of Microsoft.

== Businesses and investments ==
=== Financial and technology ===
- Vulcan Capital is an investment arm of Allen's Seattle-based Vulcan Inc., which has managed his personal fortune. In 2013, Allen opened a new Vulcan Capital office in Palo Alto, California, to focus on making new investments in emerging technology and internet companies.
- Patents: Allen held 43 patents from the United States Patent and Trademark Office.
- Apps: Allen backed A.R.O., the startup behind the mobile app Saga; SportStream, a social app for sports fans; and a content-management app called Fayve.
- Interval Research Corporation: In 1992, Allen and David Liddle co-founded Interval Research Corporation, a Silicon Valley–based laboratory and new business incubator that was dissolved in 2000 after generating over 300 patents, four of which were the subject of Allen's August 2010 patent infringement lawsuit against AOL, Apple, eBay, Facebook, Google, Netflix, Office Depot, OfficeMax, Staples, Yahoo!, and YouTube.
- Ticketmaster: In November 1993, Allen invested more than $325 million to acquire 80% of Ticketmaster. In 1997, Home Shopping Network acquired 47.5% of Allen's stock in exchange for $209 million worth of their own stock.
- AOL: In 1992, Allen invested $30 million in what was then a small internet service provider. He would ultimately own 25 percent of the company before selling his stake for a $70 million profit in 1994. He missed the dot com run up where, if he had sold his shares as their peak, he would have earned $10 billion. But he also missed the dot com bust that would come at the end of the decade.
- Charter Communications: In 1998, Allen bought a controlling interest in Charter Communications. Charter filed for bankruptcy reorganization in 2009, with Allen's loss estimated at $7 billion. Allen kept a small stake after Charter emerged from reorganization, worth $535 million in 2012. The company's 2016 purchase and subsequent merger of Time Warner Cable with Charter's subsidiary, Spectrum, made Charter Communications the second-largest cable company in the U.S.

=== Aerospace ===
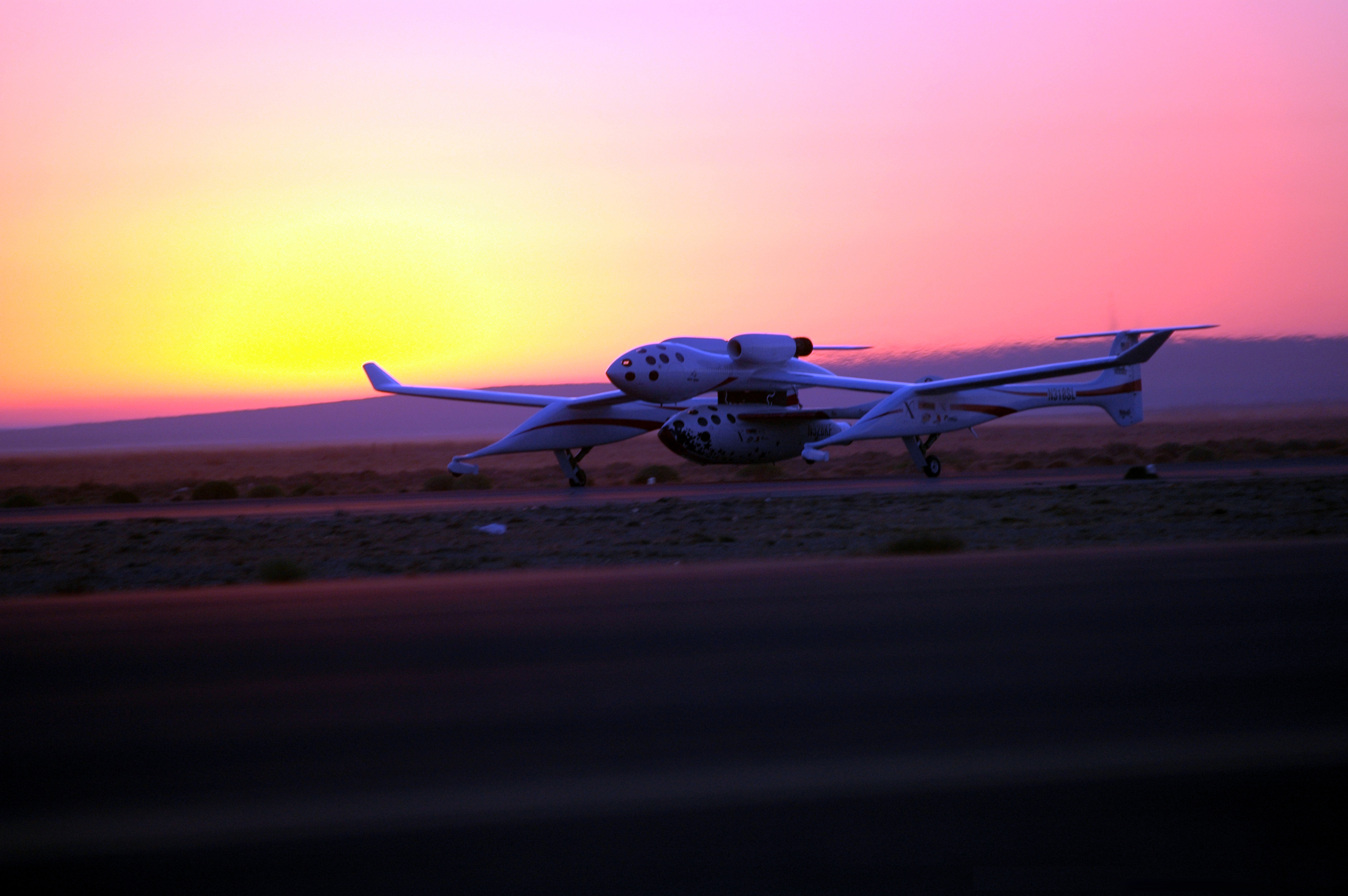
SpaceShipOne on ramp before takeoff in October 2004

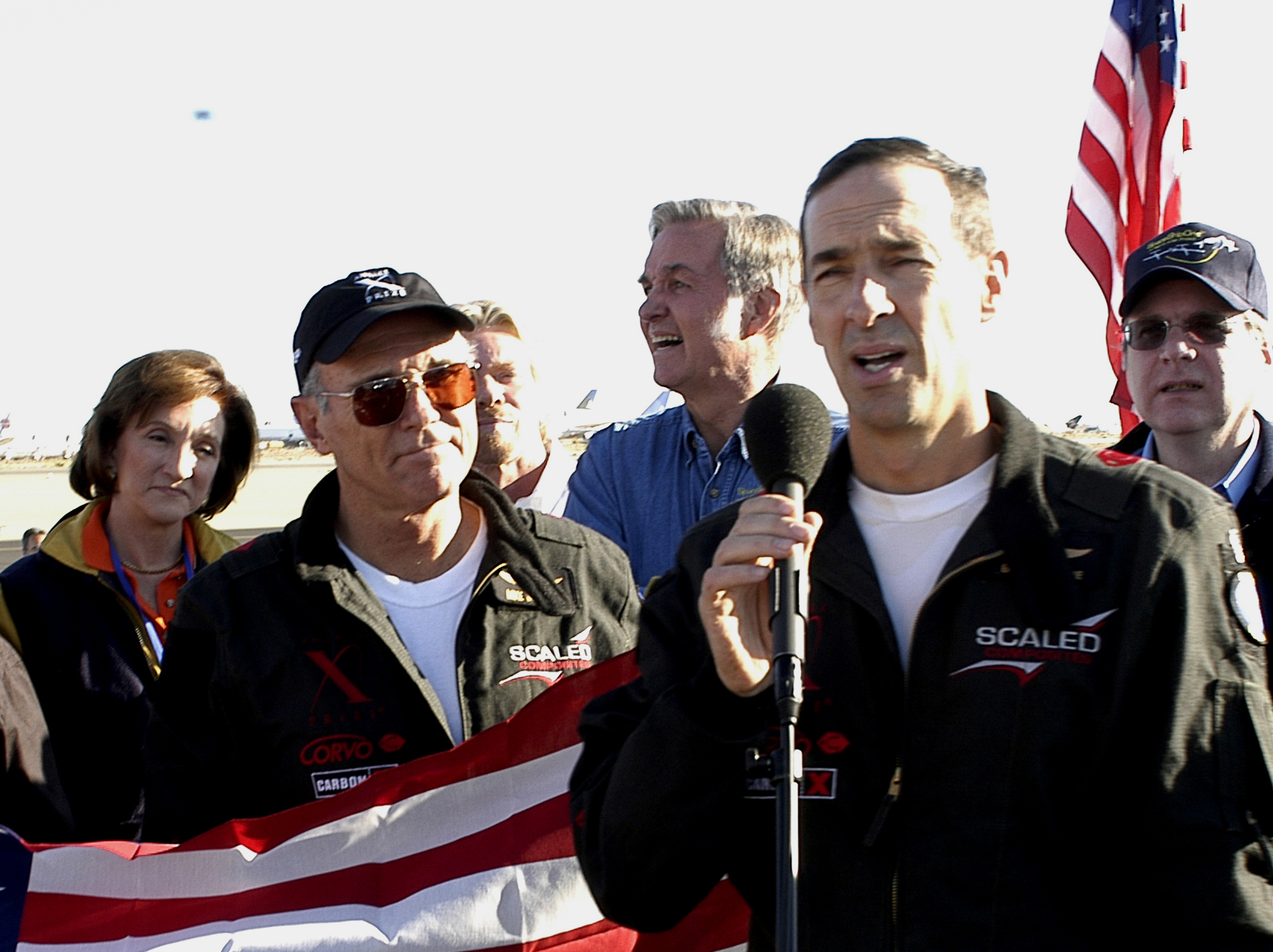
(Left–right) Marion Blakey, Mike Melvill, Richard Branson, Burt Rutan, Brian Binnie, and Allen following first flight

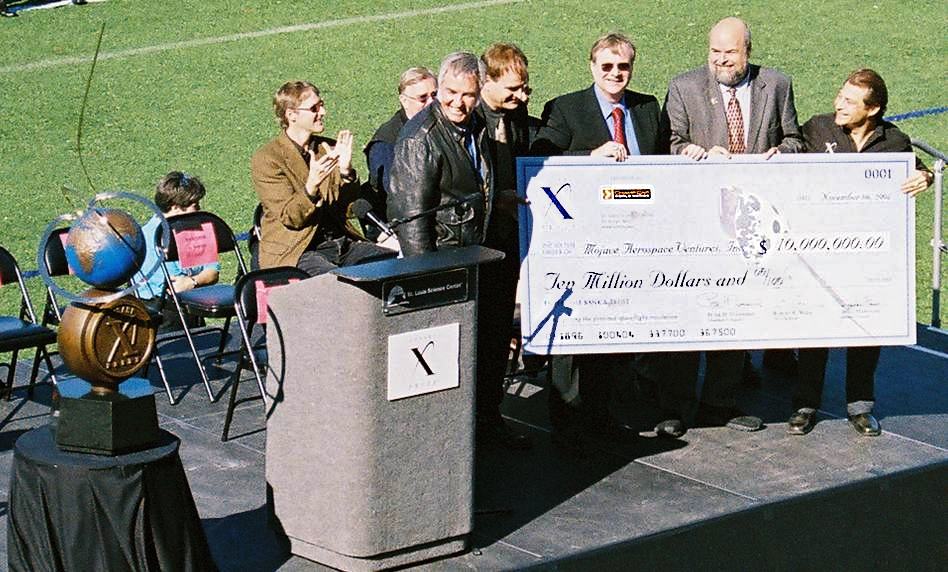
Allen (third from right) and Rutan (fifth from right) were awarded the Ansari X PRIZE by members of the X PRIZE Foundation in November 2004.

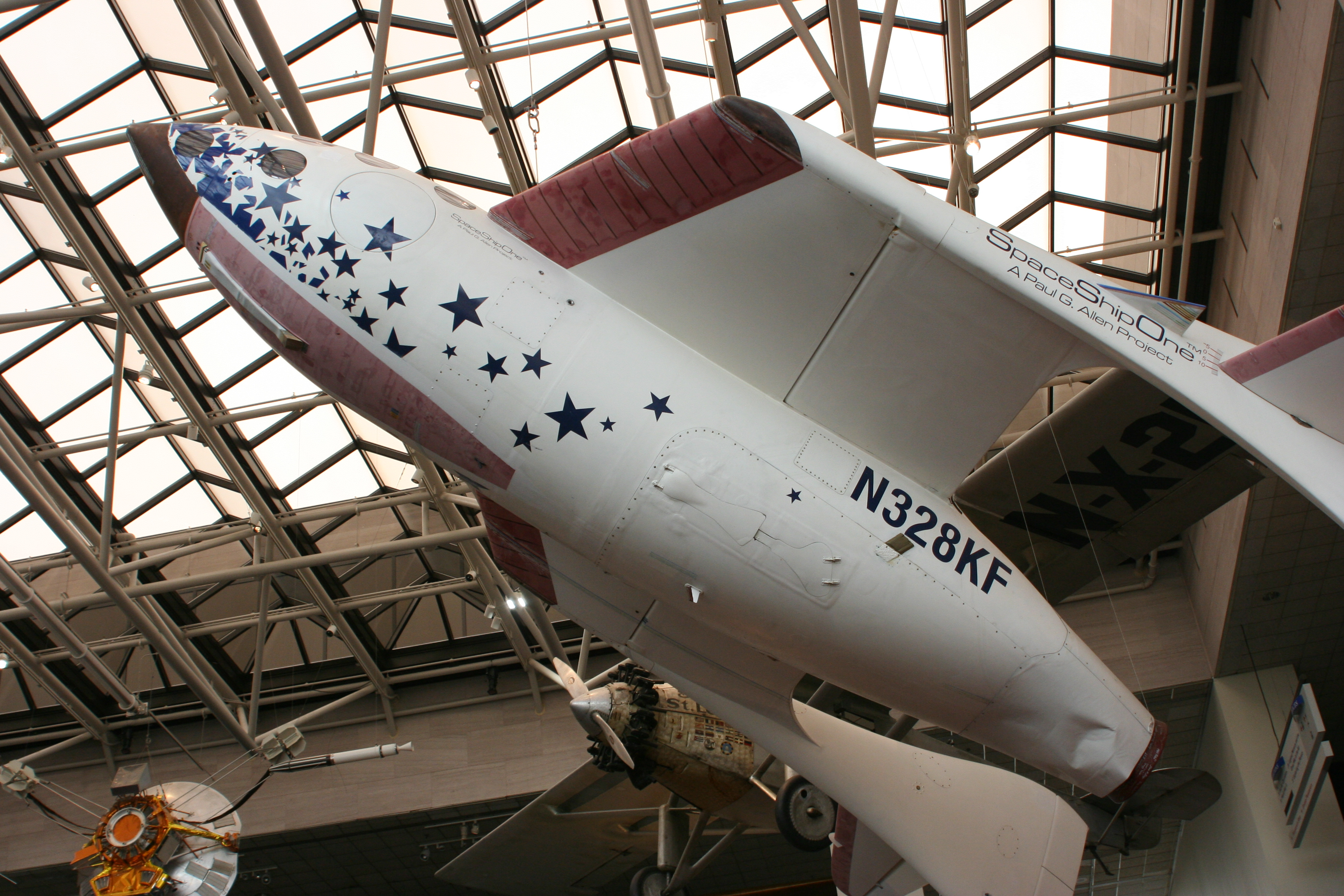
SpaceShipOne at the National Air and Space Museum

Allen confirmed that he was the sole investor behind aerospace engineer and entrepreneur Burt Rutan's SpaceShipOne suborbital commercial spacecraft on October 4, 2004. The craft was developed and flown by Mojave Aerospace Ventures, which was a joint venture between Allen and Rutan's aviation company, Scaled Composites. SpaceShipOne climbed to an altitude of 367,442 feet (111,996 m) over the Mojave Air and Space Port and was the first privately funded effort to successfully put a civilian in suborbital space. It won the Ansari X Prize competition and received the $10 million prize.

On December 13, 2011, Allen announced the creation of Stratolaunch Systems, based at the Mojave Air and Space Port. The Stratolaunch is a proposed orbital launch system consisting of a dual-bodied, six-engine jet aircraft, capable of carrying a rocket to high altitude; the rocket would then separate from its carrier aircraft and fire its own engines to complete its climb into orbit. If successful, this project would be the first wholly privately funded space transport system. Stratolaunch, which is partnering with Orbital ATK and Scaled Composites, is intended to launch in inclement weather, fly without worrying about the availability of launch pads and to operate from different locations. Stratolaunch plans to ultimately host six to ten missions per year. On April 13, 2015, Vulcan Aerospace was announced. It is the company within Allen's Vulcan Inc. that plans and executes projects to shift how the world conceptualizes space travel through cost reduction and on-demand access.

Wingspan of 2019 Stratolaunch

On April 13, 2019, the Stratolaunch aircraft made its maiden flight, reaching 15,000 ft (4,600 m) and 165 kn (306 km/h) in a 2 h 29 min flight. Stratolaunch CEO Jean Floyd offered this comment: "We dedicate this day to the man who inspired us all to strive for ways to empower the world's problem-solvers, Paul Allen. Without a doubt, he would have been exceptionally proud to see his aircraft take flight". Upon its flight, the airplane became the largest in history by wingspan.

As of the end of May 2019, Stratolaunch Systems Corporation had ceased operations.

=== Real estate ===
Allen's Vulcan Real Estate division offers development and portfolio management services, and was involved in the redevelopment of the South Lake Union neighborhood immediately north of downtown Seattle. Vulcan has developed 6.3 million square feet (590,000 m^{2}) of new residential, office, retail and biotechnology research space, and has a total development capacity of 10,000,000 sq ft (930,000 m^{2}). Vulcan advocated for the Seattle Streetcar line known as South Lake Union Streetcar, which runs from Seattle's Westlake Center to the south end of Lake Union. In 2012, The Wall Street Journal called Allen's South Lake Union investment "unexpectedly lucrative" and one that led to his firm selling a 1,800,000-square-foot (170,000 m^{2}) office complex to Amazon.com for US$1.16 billion, one of the most expensive office deals ever in Seattle. "It's exceeded my expectations", Allen said of the South Lake Union development.

=== Venues ===
- Sports and event centers: Allen funded the development of Portland's Moda Center, which he purchased in 2007. He also contributed $130 million to help build CenturyLink Field in Seattle.
- Seattle Cinerama: Allen purchased Seattle's historic Cinerama Theater in 1998, and upgraded it with 3-D capability and digital sound, in addition to interior and exterior refurbishing. The theater installed the world's first commercial digital laser projector in 2014. It was sold to Seattle International Film Festival in 2023.
- Hospital Club: Allen opened the Hospital Club in London in 2004 as a professional and social hub for people working in the creative arts. A second location in Los Angeles is under construction.

=== Sports team ownership ===
==== Portland Trail Blazers ====
Allen purchased the Portland Trail Blazers NBA team in 1988 from California real estate developer Larry Weinberg for $70 million. He was instrumental in the development and funding of the Moda Center (previously known as the Rose Garden), the arena where the Blazers play. He purchased the arena on April 2, 2007, and stated that this was a major milestone and a positive step for the franchise. The Allen-owned Trail Blazers reached the playoffs 19 times including the NBA Finals in 1990 and 1992. According to Forbes, the Blazers were valued at $2.09 billion in 2021 and ranked No. 13 out of 30 NBA teams.. In 2026, his Estate sold the Trail Blazers to an ownership group led by billionaire Tom Dundon. In accordance with Paul's wishes, all Estate proceeds from the sale of his sports assets will be dedicated to philanthropy.

==== Seattle Seahawks ====
Allen purchased the National Football League's Seattle Seahawks in 1997 from owner Ken Behring, who had attempted to move the team to southern California the previous year. Herman Sarkowsky, a former Seahawks minority owner, told The Seattle Times about Allen's decision to buy the team, "I'm not sure anybody else in this community would have done what [Allen] did."

In 2002, the team moved into Seahawks Stadium (now known as Lumen Field), after Allen invested into the upgrade of the stadium. Acquired for US$200 million in 1997, the Seahawks were valued at $1.33 billion in August 2014 by Forbes, which says the team has "one of the most rabid fan bases in the NFL". Under the helm of Allen, the Seahawks won three NFC championships (2005, 2013, 2014), and won Super Bowl XLVIII in 2014. After his death, while the team was still held by his estate, the Seahawks won Super Bowl LX in 2026. Following this second Super Bowl victory, Allen's estate sold the team to an investor group led by the family of Vinod Khosla for $9.612 billion, a record for an NFL franchise.

==== Seattle Sounders FC ====
Allen's Vulcan Sports & Entertainment is part of the ownership team of Seattle Sounders FC, a Major League Soccer (MLS) franchise that began play in 2009 at CenturyLink Field, a stadium which was also controlled by Allen. The ownership team also includes film producer Joe Roth, businessman Adrian Hanauer, and comedian Drew Carey. The Sounders sold out every home game during its first season, setting a new MLS record for average match attendance.

The Sounders won the 2016 MLS Cup during Allen's tenure as part owner.

=== Filmmaking ===
Allen and his sister, Jody Allen, together were the owners and executive producers of Vulcan Productions, a television and film production company headquartered in Seattle within the entertainment division of Vulcan Inc. Their films have received various recognition, ranging from a Peabody Award to Independent Spirit Awards, Grammys and Emmys.

In 2014 alone, Allen's film, We The Economy, won 12 awards including a Webby award for best Online News & Politics Series. The films have also been nominated for Golden Globes and Academy Awards among many others. Vulcan Productions' films and documentary projects include Far from Heaven (2002), Hard Candy (2005), Rx for Survival: A Global Health Challenge (2005), Where God Left His Shoes (2006), Judgment Day: Intelligent Design on Trial (2007), This Emotional Life (2010), We The Economy (2014) Racing Extinction (2015) and Oscar-nominated Body Team 12 (2015).

In 2013, Vulcan Productions co-produced the Richard E. Robbins-directed film Girl Rising which tells the stories of girls from different parts of the world who seek an education. Globally, over 205 million households watched Girl Rising during the CNN premier, and over 4 million people have engaged with Girl Rising through websites and social media. Through the associated 10×10 program, over $2.1 million has been donated to help girls receive an education worldwide.

Also in 2013, Vulcan Productions signed on as a producing partner of Pandora's Promise, a documentary about nuclear power, directed by Oscar-nominated director Robert Stone. It was released on CNN in November 2013. A variety of college and private screenings as well as panel discussions have been hosted throughout the country.

== Philanthropy ==
Allen gave more than $2 billion towards the advancement of science, technology, education, wildlife conservation, the arts, and community services in his lifetime.. Allen Family Philanthropies (previously known as The Paul G. Allen Family Foundation), which he founded with his sister Jody, was established to administer a portion of Allen's philanthropic contributions. From 2016 to 2026, the foundation had given more than $500 million to hundreds of nonprofits. In 2025, a new second foundation was established named Fund for Science and Technology, funded initially with $3.1 billion from his Estate, and committed to invest at least $500 million over the next four years toward its mission of accelerating discovery and catalyzing progress for people and planet through transformational science and technology.

In 2010, Allen had become a signatory of The Giving Pledge, promising to give at least half of his fortune to philanthropic causes. Allen received commendations for his philanthropy, including the Andrew Carnegie Medal of Philanthropy and Inside Philanthropy's "Philanthropist of the Year".

=== Science and research ===
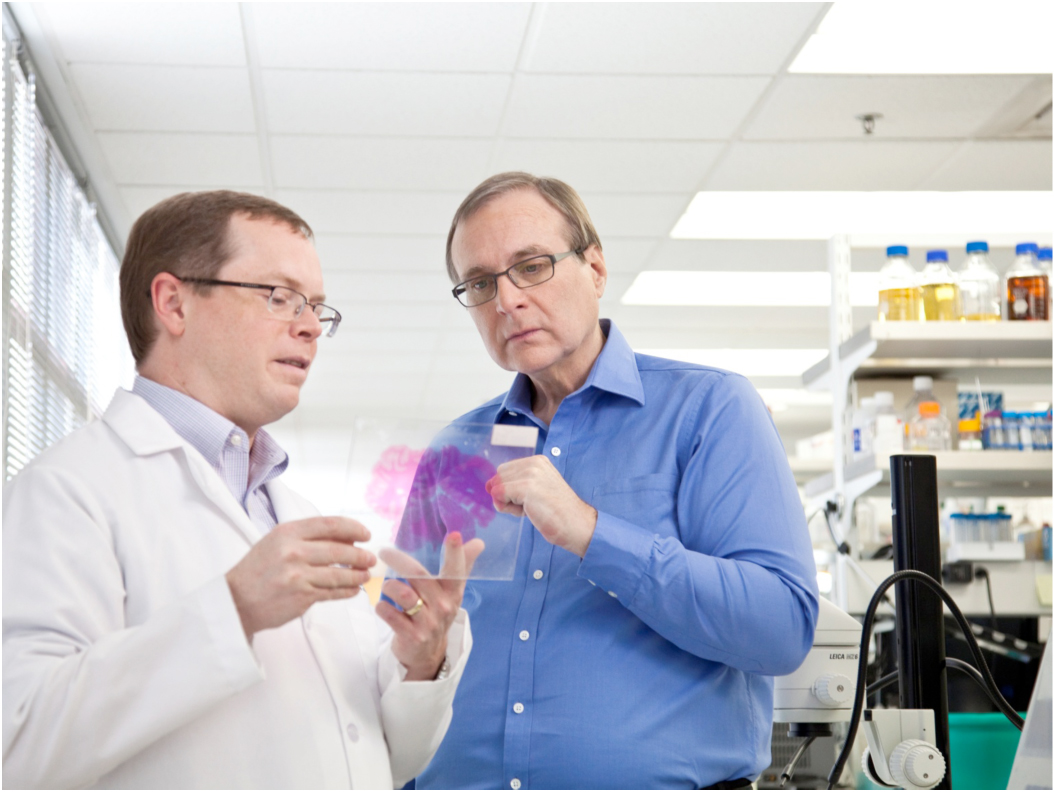
Allen (right) studies a brain sample with Allan Jones, CEO of the Allen Institute for Brain Science, in 2011.

In September 2003, Allen launched the Allen Institute for Brain Science with a $100 million contribution dedicated to understanding how the human brain works. Allen eventually donated $500 million to the institute, making it his single-largest philanthropic recipient. The institute has taken a Big Science and open science approach; it makes research tools available to the scientific community. The institute's projects include the Allen Mouse Brain Atlas, Allen Human Brain Atlas and the Allen Mouse Brain Connectivity Atlas. It helped to advance and shape the White House's BRAIN Initiative and the Human Brain Project.

Founded in 2014, the Allen Institute for Artificial Intelligence (AI2)'s main focus is to research and engineer artificial intelligence. The institute is modeled after the Allen Institute for Brain Science and led by researcher and professor Oren Etzioni. As of 2015, AI2 had undertaken four main projects, Semantic Scholar, Euclid, Plato, and Aristo—the latter of which aims to build an AI system that can pass an 8th-grade science exam.

In December 2014, Allen committed $100 million to create the Allen Institute for Cell Science in Seattle. As of 2014, the institute was investigating and creating a virtual model of cells in the hope of finding treatments for diseases. Like Allen's other institutes, all data generated and tools developed will be made publicly available online.

Launched in 2016 with a $100 million commitment, The Paul G. Allen Frontiers Group aims to discover and support ideas at the frontier of bioscience in an effort to accelerate the pace of discovery. The group seeks to support scientists and research areas that "some might consider out-of-the-box at the very edges of knowledge".

Allen launched the Allen Distinguished Investigators Awards (ADI) in 2010 to support early-stage research projects that often have difficulty securing funding from traditional sources. Allen donated the seed money to build SETI's Allen Telescope Array, eventually contributing $30 million to the project.

The Paul Allen's flower fly was named in recognition of his contributions to dipterology.

In 2022, the Paul Allen estate created the Fund for Science and Technology (FFST) and launched in August 2025 with an initial endowment of $3.1 billion and a plan to deploy at least $500 million across bioscience, the environment and AI. The foundation is led by Lynda Stuart and chaired by Jody Allen.

=== Environment and conservation ===
Allen provided more than $7 million to fund a census of elephant populations in Africa, the largest such endeavor since the 1970s. The Great Elephant Census team flew over 20 countries to survey African savannah elephants. The survey results, published in 2015, showed rapid and accelerated decline.

He began supporting the University of British Columbia's Sea Around Us Project in 2014 to improve data on global fisheries as a way to fight illegal fishing. Part of his $2.6 million in funding went towards the creation of FishBase, an online database about adult finfish. Allen funded the Global FinPrint initiative, launched in July 2015, a three-year survey of sharks and rays in coral reef areas. The survey is the largest of its kind and designed to provide data to help conservation programs.

Allen backed Washington state initiative 1401 to prohibit the purchase, sale and distribution of products made from 10 endangered species including elephants, rhinos, lions, tigers, leopards, cheetahs, marine turtles, pangolins, sharks and rays. The initiative gained enough signatures to be on the state's ballot on November 3, 2015, and passed.

Alongside the United States Department of Transportation (USDOT), Allen and Vulcan Inc. launched the Smart City Challenge, a contest inviting American cities to transform their transportation systems. Created in 2015 with the USDOT's $40 million commitment as well as $10 million from Allen's Vulcan Inc., the challenge aims to create a first-of-its-kind modern city that will demonstrate how cities can improve quality of life while lowering greenhouse gas emissions. The winning city was Columbus, Ohio.

As a member of the International SeaKeepers Society, Allen hosted its proprietary SeaKeeper 1000TM oceanographic and atmospheric monitoring system on all three of his megayachts.

Allen funded the building of microgrids, which are small-scale power grids that can operate independently, in Kenya, to help promote reusable energy and empower its businesses and residents. He was an early investor in the Mawingu Networks, a wireless and solar-powered Internet provider which aims to connect rural Africa with the world, and Off Grid Electric, a company focused on providing solar energy to people in emerging nations.

=== Ebola ===
In 2014, Allen pledged at least $100 million toward the fight to end the Ebola virus epidemic in West Africa, making him the largest private donor in the Ebola crisis. He also created a website called TackleEbola.org as a way to spread awareness and serve as a vehicle for donors to fund projects in need. The site highlighted organizations working to stop Ebola that Allen supported, such as International Red Cross and Red Crescent Movement, Médecins Sans Frontières, Partners in Health, UNICEF and World Food Program USA. On April 21, 2015, Allen brought together key leaders in the Ebola fight at the Ebola Innovation Summit in San Francisco. The summit aimed to share key learnings and reinforce the need for continued action and support to reduce the number of Ebola cases to zero, which was achieved in January 2016.

In October 2015, the Paul G. Allen Family Foundation announced it would award seven new grants totaling $11 million to prevent future widespread outbreaks of the virus.

=== Exploration ===
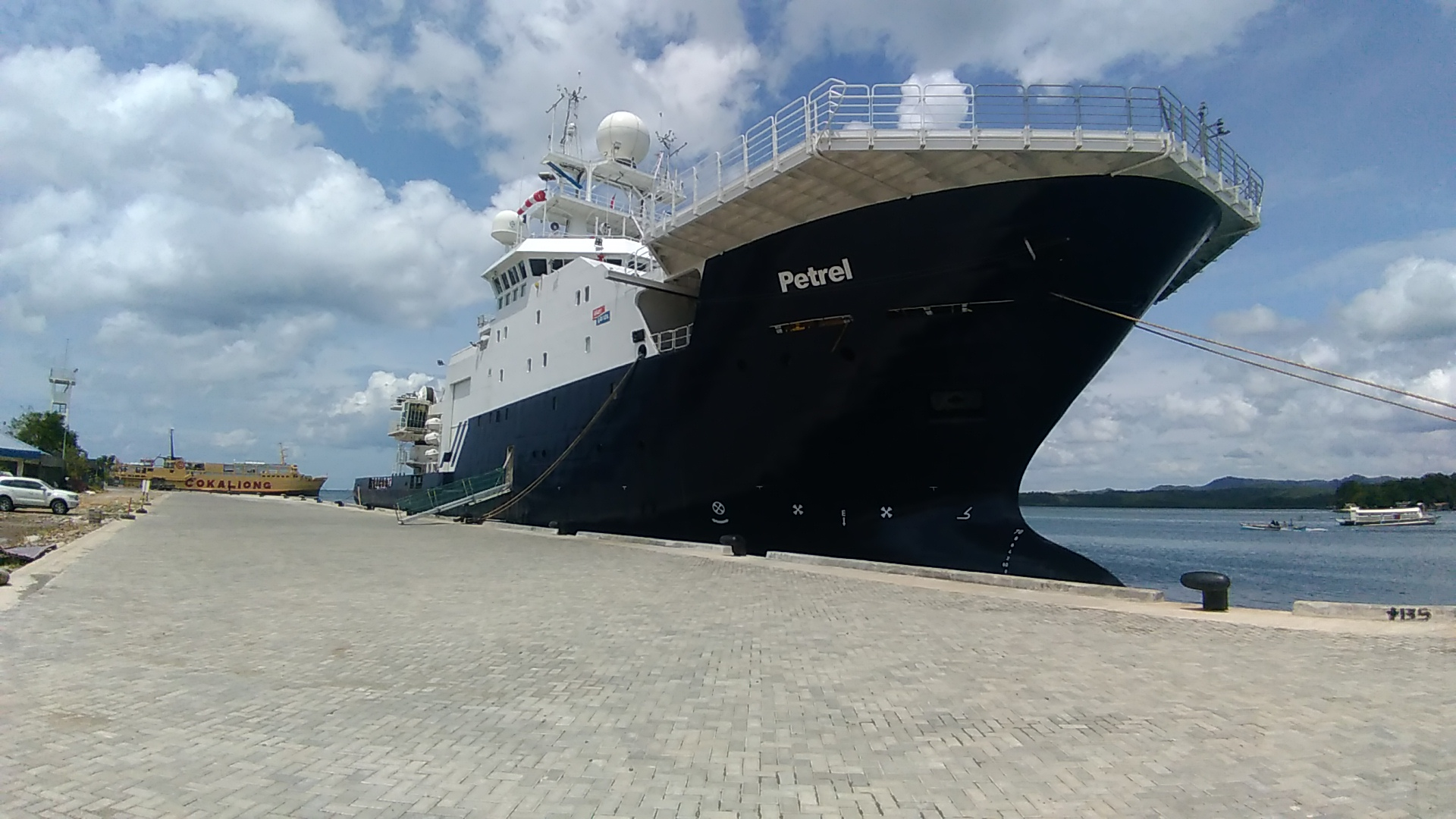
RV Petrel arriving at Surigao City in 2018

In 2012, along with his research team and the Royal Navy, Allen attempted to retrieve the ship's bell from HMS Hood, which sank in the Denmark Strait during World War II, but the attempt failed due to poor weather. On August 7, 2015, they tried again and recovered the bell in very good condition. It was restored and put on display in May 2016 in the National Museum of the Royal Navy, Portsmouth, in remembrance of the 1,415 crewmen lost.

Allen funded the research ship RV Petrel in 2015 and bought it the following year. The project team aboard Petrel found the wreck of the Japanese battleship Musashi in 2015. In 2017, at Allen's direction, Petrel found the wrecks of USS Indianapolis and USS Ward and multiple wrecks from the Battle of Surigao Strait and the Battle of Ormoc Bay. In 2018, Petrel found a lost US Navy C-2A Greyhound aircraft in the Philippine Sea, USS Lexington in the Coral Sea, and the USS Juneau off the coast of the Solomon Islands.

=== Museums and community institutions ===
Allen established non-profit community institutions to display his collections of historic artifacts. These include:

- Museum of Pop Culture, or MoPOP, is a nonprofit museum, dedicated to contemporary popular culture inside a Frank Gehry–designed building at Seattle Center, established in 2000.
- Flying Heritage Collection, which showcases restored vintage military aircraft and armaments primarily from the World War II era, established in 2004.
- STARTUP Gallery, a permanent exhibit at the New Mexico Museum of Natural History and Science in Albuquerque dedicated to the history of the microcomputer, established in 2007.
- Living Computer: Museum + Labs, a collection of vintage computers in working order and available for interactive sessions on-site or through networked access, opened to the public in 2012.

=== Art ===
An active art collector, Allen gave more than $100 million to support the arts. On October 15, 2012, the Americans for the Arts gave him the Eli and Edythe Broad Award for Philanthropy in the Arts. Allen loaned out more than 300 pieces from his private art collection to 47 venues. The original 541-page typescript of Bram Stoker's novel Dracula was in his collection at one point. In 2013, Allen sold Barnett Newman's Onement VI (1953) at Sotheby's in New York for $43.8 million, then the record for a work by the abstract artist.

In 2015, Allen founded the Seattle Art Fair, a four-day event with 60-plus galleries from around the world including the participation of the Gagosian Gallery, David Zwirner. The event drew thousands and inspired other satellite fairs throughout the city.

In August 2016, Allen announced the launch of Upstream Music Fest + Summit, an annual festival fashioned after South by Southwest. Held in Pioneer Square, the first festival took place in May 2017. It was cancelled in 2019 following Allen's death in 2018.

In November 2022, Allen's art collection was auctioned at Christie's New York. It was the biggest sale in art auction history, surpassing $1.5 billion in sales. Six works sold for more than $100 million: Seurat's Les Poseuses Ensemble (Petite version), ($149 million, with fees); Paul Cézanne's 1888-90 La Montagne Sainte-Victoire ($138 million); van Gogh's Verger avec cyprès ($117 million); and Gustav Klimt's 1903 Birch Forest ($105 million). The auction also included paintings by Botticelli, David Hockney, Roy Lichtenstein, Edward Hopper, Andy Warhol, Jasper Johns and Jan Brueghel the Younger. Proceeds from the auction benefitted undisclosed philanthropies.

=== Education ===
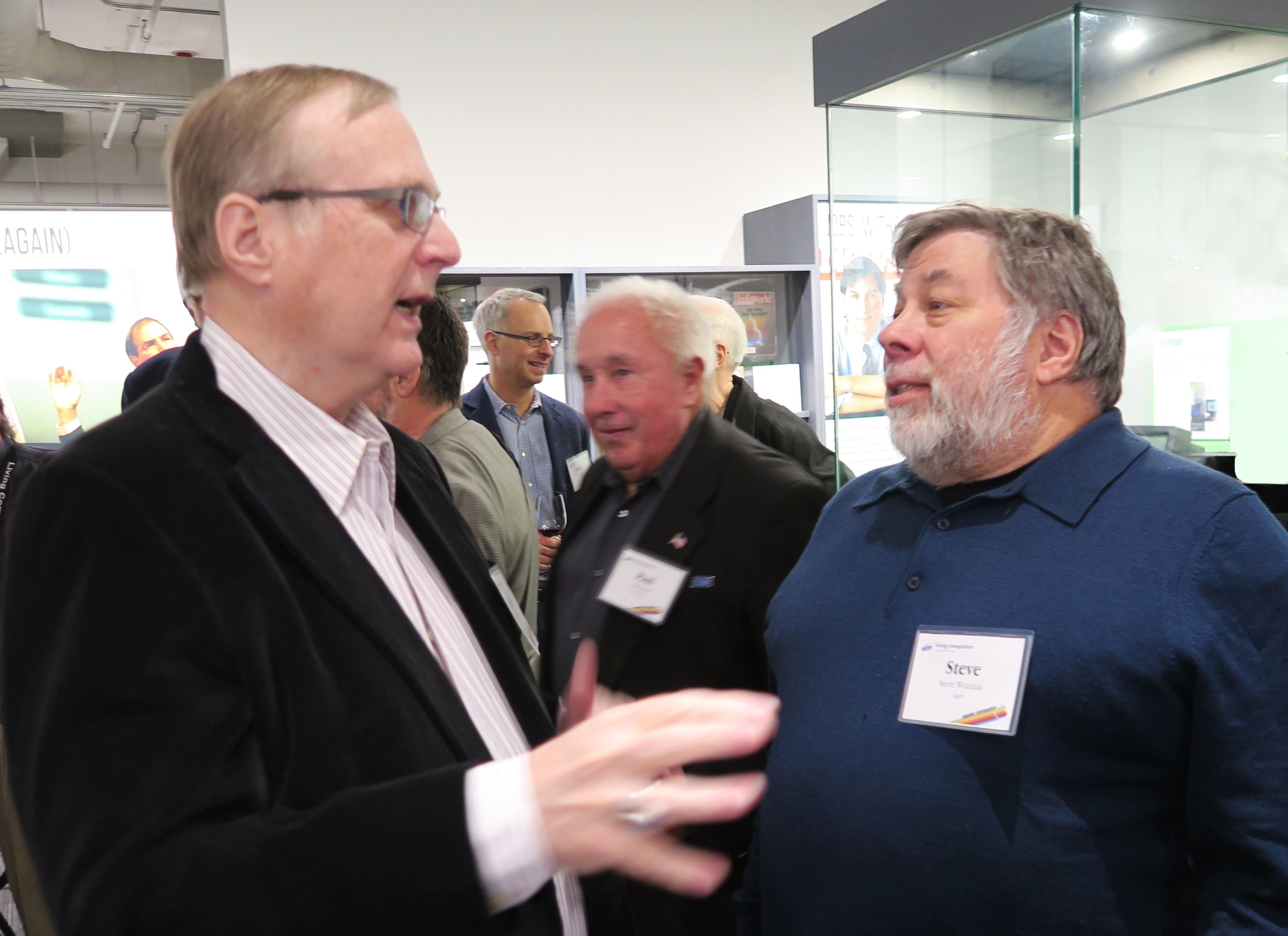
Allen and Apple co-founder Steve Wozniak at the Living Computer Museum in 2017

In 1989, Allen donated $2 million to the University of Washington to construct the Allen Library, which was named after his father Kenneth S. Allen, a former associate director of the University of Washington library system. In the same year, Allen donated an additional $8 million to establish the Kenneth S. Allen Library Endowment. In 2012, the endowment was renamed the Kenneth S. and Faye G. Allen Library Endowment after Allen's mother (a noted bibliophile) died.

In 2002, Allen donated $14 million to the University of Washington to construct the Paul G. Allen Center for Computer Science and Engineering. The building was dedicated in October 2003.

In 2010, Allen announced a gift of $26 million to build the Paul G. Allen School of Global Animal Health at Washington State University, his alma mater. The gift was the largest private donation in the university's history.

In 2016, Allen pledged a $10 million donation over four years for the creation of the Allen Discovery Centers at Tufts University and Stanford University. The centers would fund research that would read and write the morphogenetic code. Over eight years the donation could be as much as $20 million.

In 2017, Allen donated $40 million (with an additional $10 million from Microsoft) to reorganize the University of Washington's Computer Science and Engineering department into the Paul G. Allen School of Computer Science and Engineering.

== Personal life ==
While Allen expressed interest in romantic love and one day having a family, he never married and had no children. His marriage plans with his first girlfriend were cancelled as he felt he "was not ready to marry at 23". He was sometimes considered reclusive. In the 1990s, he purchased Rock Hudson's Los Angeles estate from film director John Landis and added the Neptune Valley recording studio to the property. Allen's family put the home on the market for $56 million after his death.

=== Music ===
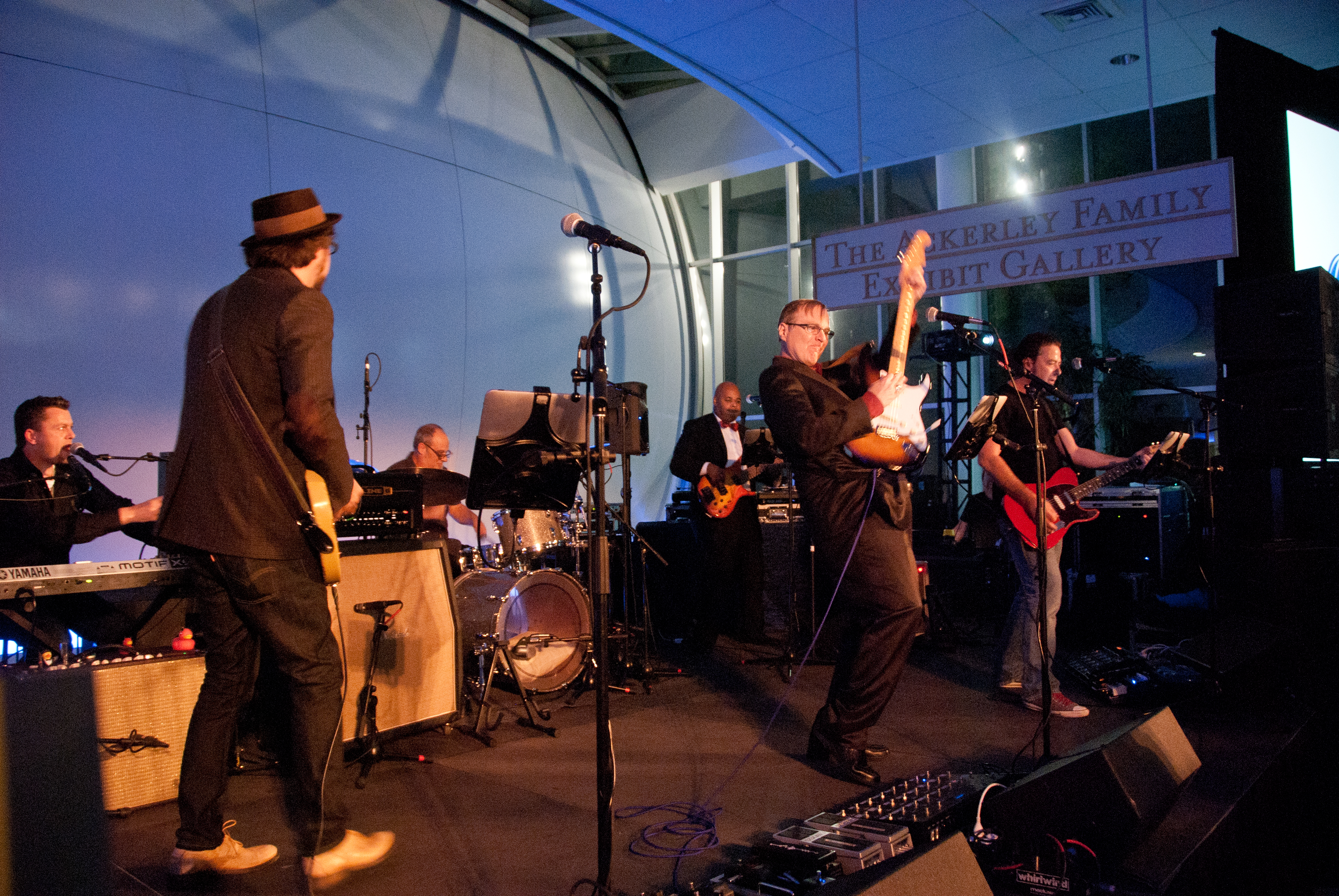
Allen and the Underthinkers performing at the Allen Institute for Brain Science's 10th-anniversary gala

Allen received his first electric guitar at the age of sixteen, and was inspired to play it by listening to Jimi Hendrix. In 2000, Allen played rhythm guitar on the independently produced album Grown Men. In 2013, he had a major label release on Sony's Legacy Recordings: Everywhere at Once by Paul Allen and the Underthinkers. PopMatters.com described Everywhere at Once as "a quality release of blues-rock that's enjoyable from start to finish".

On February 7, 2018, an interview by the magazine New York on their Vulture website, Quincy Jones expressed respect for Allen's talent, saying he "sings and plays just like Hendrix".

=== Yachting ===
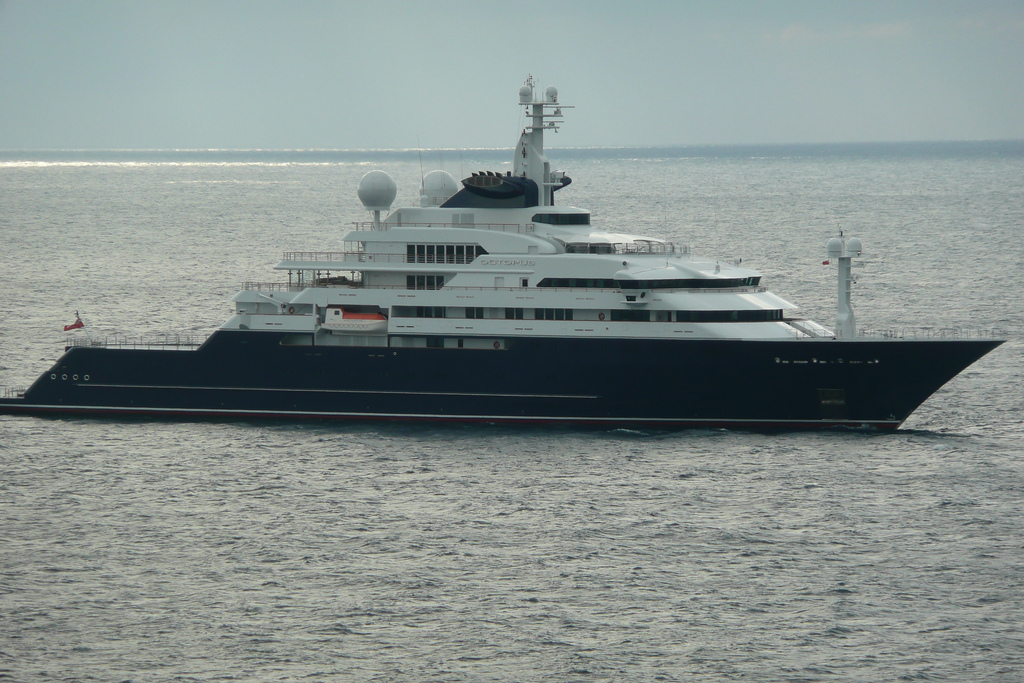
Allen's Octopus off the Cayman Islands in 2010

Allen's 414-foot (126 m) yacht, Octopus, was launched in 2003. As of 2025, it was 26th on the list of motor yachts by length. The yacht is equipped with two helicopters, a submarine, an ROV, a swimming pool, a music studio and a basketball court. Octopus is a member of AMVER, a voluntary group ship reporting system used worldwide by authorities to arrange assistance for those in distress at sea. The ship is also known for its annual celebrity-studded parties which Allen hosted at the Cannes film festival, where Allen and his band played for guests. These performances included musicians such as Usher and Dave Stewart. Octopus was also used in the search for a missing American pilot and two officers whose plane disappeared off Palau, and the study of a rare fish called a coelacanth, among many others. Following Allen's death in 2018, Octopus was refitted and put on the market for $325 million.

Allen also owned Tatoosh, one of the world's 100 largest yachts. In January 2016, Tatoosh severely damaged about 1,300 square meters of coral reef in the West Bay replenishment zone of the Cayman Islands. In April 2016, the Department of Environment and Allen's Vulcan Inc. completed a restoration plan to help speed recovery and protect the future of coral in the area.

== Idea Man ==
In 2011, Allen's memoir, Idea Man: A Memoir by the Co-founder of Microsoft, was published by Portfolio, a Penguin Group imprint. The book recounts how Allen became enamored with computers and, at an early age, conceived the idea for Microsoft, recruited his friend Bill Gates to join him, and launched what would become the world's most successful software company. It also explores Allen's business and creative ventures following his 1983 departure from Microsoft, including his involvement in SpaceShipOne, his purchase of the Portland Trail Blazers and Seattle Seahawks, his passion for music, and his ongoing support for scientific research. The book made the New York Times Best Seller list. A paperback version, which included a new epilogue, was published on October 30, 2012.

== Death ==
Allen was diagnosed with Stage 1-A Hodgkin's lymphoma in 1982. His cancer was successfully treated by several months of radiation therapy. Allen was diagnosed with non-Hodgkin lymphoma in 2009. Likewise, the cancer was successfully treated until it returned in 2018. It ultimately caused his death by septic shock on October 15, 2018. He was 65 years old. Allen's sister, Jody Allen, was named executor and trustee of his estate.

Several Seattle-area landmarks, including the Space Needle, Columbia Center and Lumen Field, as well as various Microsoft offices throughout the United States, were illuminated in blue on November 3, 2018, as a tribute to Allen. He was also honored by his early business partner and lifelong friend Bill Gates, who said in a statement:

Paul loved life and those around him, and we all cherished him in return. He deserved much more time, but his contributions to the world of technology and philanthropy will live on for generations to come. We will miss him tremendously.

== Awards and recognition ==
Allen received numerous awards in many different areas, including sports, technology, philanthropy, and the arts:

- In 2004, Allen, Burt Rutan, Doug Shane, Mike Melvill, and Brian Binnie won the Collier Trophy for SpaceShipOne.
- On March 9, 2005, Allen, Rutan, and the rest of the SpaceShipOne team were awarded the 2005 National Air and Space Museum Trophy for Current Achievement.
- In 2007 and 2008, Allen was listed among the Time 100 Most Influential People in The World.
- He received the Vanguard Award from the National Cable & Telecommunications Association on May 20, 2008.
- On October 30, 2008, the Seattle-King County Association of Realtors honored Allen for his "unwavering commitment to nonprofit organizations in the Pacific Northwest and lifetime giving approaching US$1 billion".
- In 2009, Allen's philanthropy as the long-time owner of the Portland Trail Blazers was recognized with an Oregon Sports Award.
- On October 26, 2010, Allen was awarded the W. J. S. Krieg Lifetime Achievement Award for his contributions to the field of neuroscience by the Cajal Club.
- On January 26, 2011, at Seattle's Benaroya Hall, Allen was named Seattle Sports Commission Sports Citizen of the Year, an award that has been renamed the Paul Allen Award.
- In 2011, Allen was elected to the American Academy of Arts and Sciences.
- On October 15, 2012, Allen received the Eli and Edythe Broad Award for Philanthropy in the Arts at the National Arts Awards.
- On February 2, 2014, Allen received a Super Bowl ring as the Seattle Seahawks won the Vince Lombardi Trophy.
- On October 22, 2014, Allen received a Lifetime Achievement Award from Seattle Business magazine for his impact in and around the greater Puget Sound region.
- On December 31, 2014, online philanthropy magazine Inside Philanthropy made Allen their inaugural "Philanthropist of the Year" for his ongoing effort to stop the Ebola outbreak in West Africa, breaking ground on a new research center in Seattle, and his battle to save the world's oceans.
- In 2014, Allen was inducted into the International Space Hall of Fame.
- On July 18, 2015, Ischia Global Film & Music Festival recognized Allen with the Ischia Humanitarian Award. Event organizers honored Allen for his contributions to social issues through his philanthropic efforts.
- On August 25, 2015, Allen was named a recipient of the Andrew Carnegie Medal of Philanthropy for his work to "save endangered species, fight Ebola, research the human brain, support the arts, protect the oceans, and expand educational opportunities for girls".
- On October 3, 2015, the Center for Infectious Disease Research presented Allen with the 2015 "Champion for Global Health Award" for his leadership and effort to fight Ebola.
- On December 10, 2016, Allen, as co-owner of the Seattle Sounders FC, won the 2016 MLS Cup.
- On March 14, 2019, Allen was one of two recipients of the Aviation Week & Space Technology 2019 Philip J. Klass Award for Lifetime Achievement.
- On October 3, 2019, Allen was posthumously inducted into the Seattle Seahawks Ring of Honor, ironically he was the 12th person inducted into the Ring Of Honor, which is a fitting for the number 12, which represents the fans.

=== Honorary degrees ===
- Honorary degree from the Washington State University. The university bestowed its highest honor, the Regents' Distinguished Alumnus Award, upon him.
- Honorary doctorate in philosophy from Nelson Mandela Metropolitan University.
- Honorary doctorate of Science from the Cold Spring Harbor Laboratory's Watson School of Biological Sciences.
- Honorary degree from the École Polytechnique Fédérale de Lausanne.

== See also ==
- Altair 8800
- Black Sky: The Race for Space, a 2005 documentary about Allen, SpaceShipOne and the Ansari X Prize.
- List of select cases of Hodgkin lymphoma
- Open Letter to Hobbyists
- Pirates of Silicon Valley, a 1999 film about the rise of the PC. Allen is portrayed by Josh Hopkins.

Sporting positions
| Preceded by Ken Behring | Seattle Seahawks principal owner 1997–2018 | Succeeded by Jody Allen |
| Preceded by Larry Weinberg | Portland Trail Blazers principal owner 1988–2018 | Succeeded by Jody Allen |
| New creation | Portland Fire principal owner 2000–2002 | Succeeded by Alex Bhathal; Lisa Bhathal Merage |
| Preceded by (expansion team) | Seattle Sounders FC owner 2008–2018 | Succeeded by Adrian Hanauer |
