= Richard E. Robbins =

American filmmaker and documentary maker

Richard E. Robbins is an American filmmaker and documentary maker, who has produced and directed several documentaries for ABC and PBS. The most notable is Operation Homecoming: Writing the Wartime Experience, which puts forward the perspective of American troops returning home from service in Iraq. In January 2008, Robbins received an Academy Award nomination for the film as well as two Emmy nominations, and nominations from the International Documentary Association and the Directors Guild of America. He is also a noted producer, having produced several series for Peter Jennings Reporting, including Peter Jennings Reporting: LAPD and Peter Jennings Reporting: Dark Horizon – India, Pakistan, and the Bomb. He was a producer for the ABC special The Century: America's Time.

He is a graduate of Harvard College.

== Produced ==
1. Operation Homecoming 2007
2. Peter Jennings Reporting: LAPD 2004
3. Peter Jennings Reporting: I Have a Dream 2003
4. History Undercover: Uprising! Afghanistan's Deadliest Battle 2003
5. Peter Jennings Reporting: Dark Horizon – India, Pakistan, and the Bomb 2000

== See also ==
- Peter Jennings
- American cinema
- History of Film
