= Pilot (Cougar Town) =

- Cougar Town episode
- Episode no.: Season 1 Episode 1
- Directed by: Bill Lawrence
- Written by: Bill Lawrence &; Kevin Biegel
- Original air date: September 23, 2009

Guest appearances
- Carolyn Hennesy as Barbara Coman; David Rogers as Matt; Jonathan McDaniel as Ryan; Tyler Steelman as Robbie

Episode chronology
← Previous —	Next → "Into the Great Wide Open"
- Cougar Town season 1

"Pilot" is the pilot episode of the American television sitcom Cougar Town, which premiered on ABC on September 23, 2009. The episode was directed by series creator Bill Lawrence, and written by Lawrence and Kevin Biegel. The pilot introduces seven main cast members: Jules Cobb (Courteney Cox) as a 40-year-old mother who's newly single; Ellie Torres (Christa Miller), Jules' next door neighbor and best friend; Laurie Keller (Busy Philipps), Jules' younger employee; Bobby Cobb (Brian Van Holt), Jules' unemployed ex-husband; Travis Cobb (Dan Byrd), Jules' 17-year-old son; Andy Torres (Ian Gomez), Ellie's husband; and Grayson Ellis (Josh Hopkins), Jules' newly divorced neighbor.

The episode aired between the other two pilots, Modern Family and Eastwick. It achieved 11.4 million viewers, coming first in its timeslot. Critical response was mixed, with Los Angeles Times' Mary McNamara stating that the show "is fun and exciting for women over 40" and that the "maddening thing about 'Cougar Town' is that it isn't completely unfunny or uncharming."

== Plot ==
Jules examines her naked body in the mirror after coming out of the shower. At a football game at her son's high school, Jules relaxes in the stands with her friend and co-worker, Laurie. They are playing the traditional game of "Son...or Boyfriend?" with a few 40-something moms sitting with much younger guys. Meanwhile, Laurie tries to convince Jules to go out and party, but Jules has two glasses of wine and a Scrabble board waiting at home for her best friend and neighbor, Ellie, to come over. However, Ellie promised her husband Andy that they would have sex at least once a month and he is making her honor the agreement. The next morning, Jules goes outside to get the newspaper and sees her 40-something neighbor, Grayson, say goodbye to another 20-something conquest. This time, she confronts him about the fact he's sleeping with sorority girls only a week after his wife leaves him. He thinks it's because she couldn't "bag a young stud if she tried." Therefore, she tries by flashing a kid on a bicycle. The kid eventually crashes headfirst into a car.

After dropping Travis off at school, he trudges off for a day of humiliation after dealing with his mom's busty real estate ads around town, and his dad's new job as his school's lawn mower. As a real estate agent, Jules has the obligatory lawn signs posted all over town. Jules is horrified that Laurie would do that, but Laurie is hell-bent on getting Jules out in the dating world. After seeing another older man with a younger girl, Laurie insists she and Jules go out and have a little fun. After arriving at the club, Jules soon meets a younger guy, Matt, and though drunk by the end of the night, she goes home alone. When Jules gets home, she is ready to share a bottle of wine with Ellie. Although, Laurie unexpectedly swings by and leaves Matt at Jules's place. Reluctantly, Jules sleeps with Matt three times. Several hours later, they are relaxing by her pool, and she wants to do something to him she always told her ex-husband she hated. As Jules attempts to go down on Matt, Bobby and Travis walk in. In the morning, she tries to apologize to Travis and explain she fears shriveling up and dying if she doesn't get out and do things. Feeling bad for Travis' bitterness toward her posters, Jules and Laurie chase down the kid responsible for stealing most of the posters.

== Production ==
=== Conception ===
Cougar Town was created by Bill Lawrence and Kevin Biegel. Lawrence is best known as the creator of Scrubs. He drew inspiration from his real-life wife, actress Christa Miller who also stars in the show as Ellie. Lawrence and Kevin Biegel, who worked together writing episode on Scrubs, decided to create a show with Courteney Cox as a 40-year-old, newly single woman because he thought that it was a real "zeitgeist-y topic." Cox and Lawrence had worked together on Scrubs, with Cox guest-starring in the first three episodes of the eighth season. Lawrence was also a staff writer on Friends during the show's first season. Before pitching the idea to ABC, other titles for the show included 40 and Single and The Courteney Cox Show. After pitching the idea to ABC, they asked him to have a pilot ready to shoot by the end of January 2009. Lawrence and Biegel together wrote the script with Lawrence, who has written and directed many episodes on Scrubs, directing the episode.

=== Filming ===
The series takes place in Sarasota, Florida although it is filmed at Culver Studios in Culver City, California. The pilot episode began filming in January 2009 and was directed and written by Bill Lawrence. Lawrence serves as executive producer/writer/director, Kevin Biegel as writer/co-executive producer, and Courteney Cox and David Arquette are executive producers. It is produced by Doozer Productions and Coquette Productions (headed by Cox and her husband David Arquette) and is from ABC Studios. Original music for Cougar Town is composed by singer-songwriter WAZ & the production team Golden-Sgro.

== Reception ==
The episode was first broadcast in the United States on ABC on September 23, 2009, in the 9:30–10 p.m. (PST) timeslot. The episode drew an average of 11.28 million viewers on first broadcast. It opened with initially mixed reviews from television critics. Metacritic gave the series 49 out of 100 based on the pilot episode, from the 21 reviews. Ken Tucker of Entertainment Weekly gave the pilot episode a B, commenting that the show mixes "clinical realism (when did you last hear a C-section scar used as a punchline?) with ridiculous slang (a new boob job is referred to as gorilla heads), Cougar Town is so brashly vulgar, it's endearing." Tucker also stated that it "is so single-minded that this obsession itself becomes funny." Variety stated that the show "does feed into the dual sense of insecurity and self-empowerment that women harbor about getting older ... though, the execution here is consistently about as subtle as a kick to the groin." Steve Heisler of The A.V. Club gave the episode a B−, although compared Cox's character to Elliot Reid from Scrubs, stating that Cox is "cartoonishly self-serious and has a propensity to say whatever it is she's thinking."

Alan Sepinwall of The Star-Ledger feels that "'Cougar Town' is still finding itself, but it’s already much better than the title would suggest [...] the show "has to walk a very careful line between making fun of the cougar concept and embracing it" although based on the two episodes "'Cougar Town' is self-aware enough to pull that off." USA Today was also favourable saying that the show has "the right cast and good writing." Jezebel gave the show negative reviews stating, "It's clichéd, it's lame, it's undignified. It smacks of predatory desperation," while Ryan Brockington of New York Post compared the show to ABC's recently canceled Samantha Who?.
