= David Arquette =

American actor, producer, and professional wrestler (born 1971)

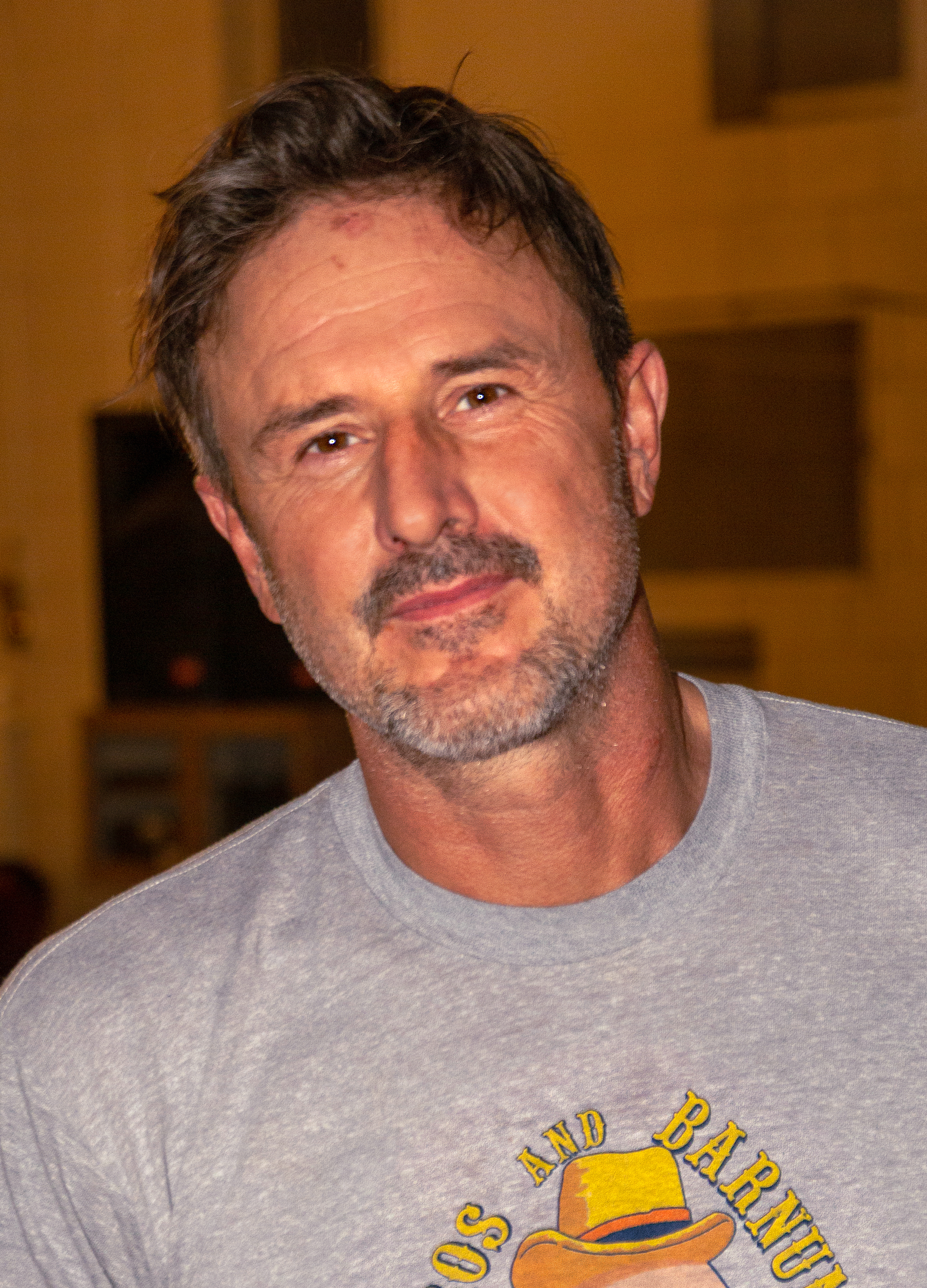
- Arquette in 2019
- Born: David James Arquette; September 8, 1971 (age 55); Bentonville, Virginia, U.S.
- Occupations: Actor; professional wrestler; producer
- Years active: 1990–present
- Spouses: Courteney Cox (m. 1999; div. 2014); Christina McLarty (m. 2015)
- Children: 3
- Father: Lewis Arquette
- Relatives: Rosanna Arquette (sister); Patricia Arquette (sister); Alexis Arquette (sister); Cliff Arquette (grandfather); Zoë Bleu (niece)
- Professional wrestling career
- Ring name: David Arquette
- Billed height: 5 ft 10 in (1.78 m)
- Billed weight: 161 lb (73 kg)
- Trained by: Peter Avalon
- Debut: 2000
- Retired: 2021

David James Arquette (/ɑːrˈkɛt/ ar-KET; born September 8, 1971) is an American actor, producer, and retired professional wrestler. He began his acting career with a main role as Keith "Two-Bit" Matthews on the Fox drama television series The Outsiders (1990), and he made his film debut with a supporting role in Where the Day Takes You (1992). Arquette continued acting in television during the early-to-mid 1990s, with main roles as Tod Hawks on the NBC sitcom Parenthood (1990–1991) and Hunter on the CBS sitcom Double Rush (1995), and had starring roles in the films Wild Bill (1995) and Johns (1996).

Arquette's breakout came with his starring role as Dewey Riley in the slasher film Scream (1996), a role which he later reprised in five sequels from 1997 to 2022, as well as in 2026. Following Scream, he starred in the films Dream with the Fishes (1997), Ravenous (1999), and Never Been Kissed (1999). In the 2000s, Arquette starred in the films Ready to Rumble (2000), 3000 Miles to Graceland (2001), See Spot Run (2001), Eight Legged Freaks (2002), Never Die Alone (2004), The Adventures of Sharkboy and Lavagirl in 3-D (2005), and Hamlet 2 (2008). He made his directorial debut with The Tripper (2006), and had a main role as Jason Ventress on the ABC sitcom In Case of Emergency (2007).

In the 2010s, Arquette starred in the films Just Before I Go (2014), which he also produced, and Bone Tomahawk (2015), and portrayed Keith Jesperson in the Lifetime television film Happy Face Killer (2014). In the 2020s, Arquette starred in the films Spree (2020), 12 Hour Shift (2020), The Good Half (2023), and The Unholy Trinity (2024), and was the subject of the documentary film You Cannot Kill David Arquette (2020).

As a professional wrestler, Arquette is best known for his panned 2000 stint in World Championship Wrestling (WCW) where he won the WCW World Heavyweight Championship, headlining the Slamboree pay-per-view event. Arquette has also appeared in WWE and on the independent wrestling circuit, where his reception has been positive.

== Early life ==
Arquette was born in a Subud commune in Bentonville, Virginia. He is the youngest child of Brenda "Mardi" Olivia (née Nowak), an actress, burlesque dancer, poet, theater operator, activist, acting teacher, and therapist, and Lewis Arquette, a puppeteer and actor. Arquette's paternal grandfather was comedian Cliff Arquette. Arquette's mother was Jewish (from a family that emigrated from Poland) while his father was a convert from Catholicism to Islam; through him, Arquette is distantly related to explorer Meriwether Lewis. His father, whose family's surname was originally Arcouet, was partly of French-Canadian descent. Arquette's four siblings, Rosanna, Richmond, Patricia, and Alexis, all became actors as well. Arquette's father occasionally had issues with substance abuse and his mother died of breast cancer.

== Career ==
=== Acting ===
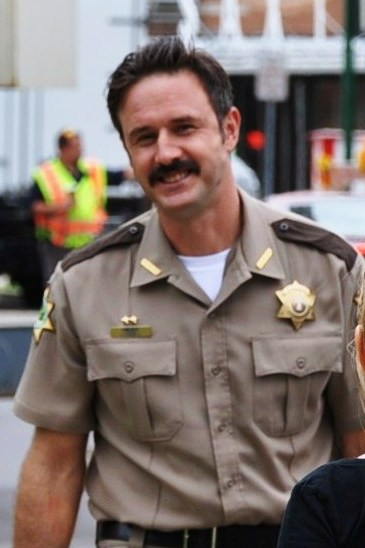
Arquette on the set of Scream 4 in July 2010

Arquette appeared in a number of films in the 1990s, including Where the Day Takes You (1992, his film debut), Buffy the Vampire Slayer (1992), Airheads (1994), Wild Bill (1995), Johns (1996), Dream with the Fishes (1997), Ravenous (1999), and Never Been Kissed (1999). His early television appearances include Keith Matthews on the Fox drama television series The Outsiders (1990), Tod Hawks on the NBC sitcom Parenthood (1990–1991) and Hunter on the CBS sitcom Double Rush (1995). He also had guest spots on television shows like Blossom (1992), Beverly Hills, 90210 (1992) and Friends (1996).

Arquette achieved his biggest success in the horror/slasher film franchise Scream. It was during the filming of the first film in 1996 that he first met his future wife, Courteney Cox. The couple married in 1999; together, they appeared in a 2003 advertisement for Coke and formed the production company Coquette (both a portmanteau of their last names and a word meaning a flirty woman), which has produced a number of films and television series, including Daisy Does America, Dirt and Cougar Town. Arquette guest starred alongside Cox on Cougar Town in 2012.

Arquette appeared in the Sega video game ESPN NFL 2K5, voicing himself as a "celebrity adversary" and manager of his own team, the Los Angeles Locos, as well as appearing as an unlockable character in Season Mode. He also appeared in the 2001 EA video game SSX Tricky, as the voice of lead character Eddie. He also starred in the films See Spot Run (2001), Eight Legged Freaks (2002), Never Die Alone (2004), The Adventures of Sharkboy and Lavagirl in 3-D (2005). Arquette starred in the 2007 ABC comedy series In Case of Emergency, which was canceled after one season. Since then, he has appeared in the 2008 film Hamlet 2 and reprised his role in Scream 4 (2011), again acting alongside Cox. He appeared alongside his sister in the TV show Medium in January 2011.

He appeared in Rascal Flatts' music video for their song "Why Wait" in 2010. Arquette, a well known horror fan, made his directorial debut with 2007's The Tripper and has signed on to direct Glutton, a 3D psychological thriller. The film began shooting in July 2011 in Canada. Arquette appeared on the 13th season of Dancing with the Stars, partnered with two-time champion Kym Johnson. He was eliminated on November 1, 2011. On October 7, 2013, Arquette's new show Dream School, in which he plays a mentor to high risk kids in L.A., premiered on the Sundance Channel. He also starred in the films Just Before I Go (2014), which he also produced, Bone Tomahawk (2015), the Lifetime television film Happy Face Killer (2014), Spree (2020), 12 Hour Shift (2020), and The Good Half (2023). In 2017, he starred in the reboot of Sigmund and the Sea Monsters as Captain Barnabus. In 2020, he was the subject of the documentary film You Cannot Kill David Arquette. In May 2020, it was confirmed that Arquette would be reprising his role as Dewey Riley for the fifth Scream film, which was directed by Matt Bettinelli-Olpin and Tyler Gillett. The film was released on January 14, 2022. In 2026, Arquette once again reprised his role as Dewey Riley in Scream 7, which was directed by Kevin Williamson.

Arquette has appeared on The Howard Stern Show many times, including multiple times as the show's celebrity intern. Arquette purchased the rights to Bozo the Clown in 2021 and has plans to revive the character.

=== Professional wrestling ===
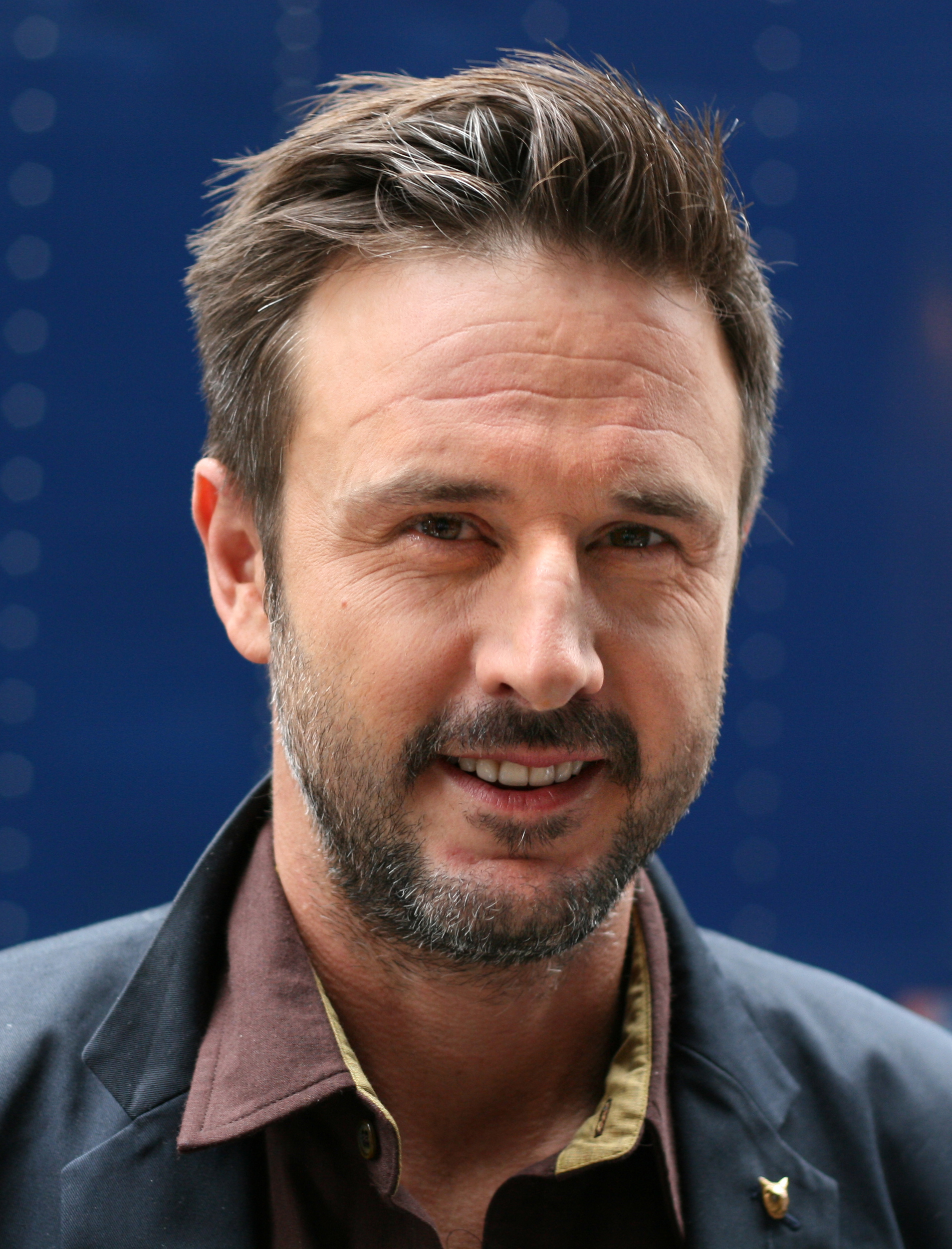
Arquette in 2009

In 2000, after filming the World Championship Wrestling (WCW) film Ready to Rumble, Arquette was brought into WCW storylines. He made his first appearance on the April 12, 2000, episode of Thunder, sitting in the crowd before leaping into the ring to take part in a worked confrontation with Eric Bischoff and his New Blood stable. Afterwards, he formed an alliance with Chris Kanyon and Diamond Dallas Page, then the reigning WCW World Heavyweight Champion. With their help, he defeated Bischoff in a singles match on the April 24 episode of Nitro. On the following episode of Thunder, Arquette teamed with Page in a match against Bischoff and Jeff Jarrett, with the stipulation that whichever man got the pin would take the championship. Arquette pinned Bischoff again in the match's finish, winning the WCW World Heavyweight Championship in the process. During his time as champion, Arquette was mostly used as comic relief. He only appeared on two shows as champion, the May 1 Nitro and May 7 Slamboree pay-per-view. During the former, a vignette was shown, filmed on the set of Arquette's film 3000 Miles to Graceland, which also featured his wife Courteney Cox and their co-star Kurt Russell. In the vignette, Cox informs Russell that Arquette is the WCW World Heavyweight Champion, causing Russell to laugh and walk off and Arquette to chase after him with a steel chair. In another portion of the show, Arquette was seen backstage trembling in fear and attempting to "give back" the championship belt. However, he did successfully defend the title against Tank Abbott with help from Page.

Arquette held the title for 12 days until the Slamboree pay-per-view on May 7, 2000, when he was booked to defend the championship against Jarrett and Page in a Triple Cage match, the same match featured in the climax of Ready to Rumble. In the end, he turned on Page and gave the victory to Jarrett. After Slamboree, Arquette cut a promo on the May 8 episode of Nitro, explaining that his entire friendship with Page and title run was a "swerve". Page subsequently ran down to the ring and hit him with a Diamond Cutter. Arquette made one final appearance with WCW at the New Blood Rising pay-per-view on August 13, when he interfered in a match between Buff Bagwell and Kanyon.

Arquette was against the idea of becoming the WCW World Heavyweight Champion, believing that fans like himself would detest a non-wrestler winning the title. Vince Russo, who was the head booker for WCW at the time, insisted that Arquette becoming the champion would be good for the company and for publicity, and Arquette reluctantly agreed to the angle. All the money he made during his WCW tenure was donated to the families of Owen Hart (who died in a freak accident), Brian Pillman (who died from an undiagnosed heart condition), and Darren Drozdov (who became a quadriplegic after an in-ring accident). After the World Wrestling Federation/World Wrestling Entertainment (WWF/WWE) purchased WCW, Arquette's championship run was listed as the top reason for the "failure" of Nitro in a list published by WWE Magazine. Gene Okerlund stated in a 2009 interview on WCW's history that "once Arquette won the title, it might as well been thrown in the trash" due to losing what little credibility it had left at that point, and Arquette's reign as champion has been criticized in other WWE media in the years since, despite the fact that the then-WWF itself briefly booked Vince McMahon as WWF Champion months before Arquette's title win.

On the December 13, 2010, episode of Raw, Arquette made his WWE debut by teaming with Alex Riley in a handicap match against Randy Orton, which they lost.

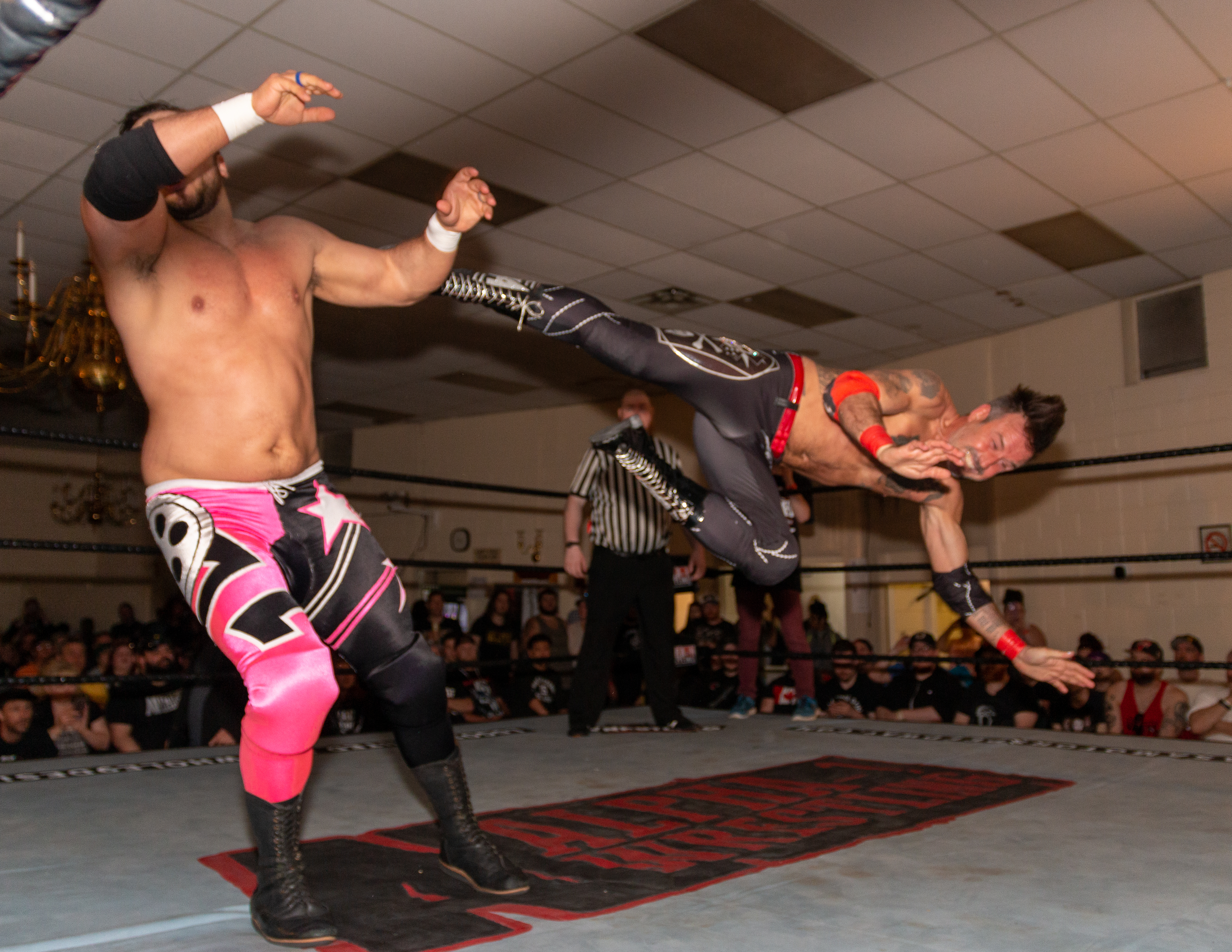
Arquette dropkicking Ethan Page in 2019

In 2018, during an interview on The Wendy Williams Show, Arquette said that, in the years following his controversial WCW title win, he had been trolled on the Internet and that he wanted people to have respect for his name in professional wrestling. He began training with professional wrestler Peter Avalon for his return. On July 15, 2018, Arquette made his return to professional wrestling making his debut for Championship Wrestling from Hollywood (CWFH) in a losing effort against RJ City.

On October 6, 2018, Arquette teamed with RJ City to defeat the team of Halal Beefcake (Idris Abraham and Joe Coleman) in a tag team match at Border City Wrestling's 25th Anniversary show in Windsor, Ontario, Canada. The event was filmed by Impact Wrestling to air as a One Night Only pay-per-view in November 2018. On November 16, 2018, Arquette wrestled Nick Gage in a deathmatch at Joey Janela's LA Confidential event. During the match, he suffered a severe cut in the neck, causing him to bleed profusely. After the match, he went to a hospital and was operated on. Arquette later stated that he was done with deathmatches.

On May 23, 2019, Arquette made his debut on Being the Elite, where he attempted to convince Nick and Matt Jackson to allow him to enter the Over the Budget Battle Royal at All Elite Wrestling's (AEW) Double or Nothing event. Neither of them recognized him at first, however they eventually recalled his WCW World Heavyweight Championship reign but still refused to let him compete, instead, giving him a double Superkick.

In June 2021, Arquette announced he was retiring as a wrestler. His last match was on July 31, 2021, as Rob Boss, teaming with A Little Angry Tree defeating Whopper Texas Ranger for Wrestling Pro Wrestling in Burbank, California.

On April 23, 2023, Arquette appeared on AEW's internet television show Hey! (EW).

On January 3, 2026, Arquette made his in ring return for Awesome Championship Wrestling, at their Poughkeepsie Rumble event. He competed in the namesake match, but was quickly eliminated by Richard Holliday.

== Other activities ==
In May 2007, Image Comics (in conjunction with Raw Studios) published David Arquette's the Tripper, drawn by Nat Jones and co-written by Joe Harris and Arquette.

He runs the clothing line Propr Collection together with Ben Harper. He was part owner of Bootsy Bellows, an exclusive nightclub in Los Angeles, now closed. The club was named for Arquette's mother, a burlesque dancer who performed by that name.

Arquette was briefly in a band by the name of Ear2000, who contributed a song to the Scream 2 soundtrack and Scream 3 soundtrack. The group, whose style blended hip hop and rock, has since broken up. Arquette has also been a part of Washington's Red Museum and recorded "Post Empire" with the band, which was released in 2011.

Arquette purchased the rights to Bozo the Clown from Larry Harmon Pictures in 2021.

== Championships and accomplishments ==
- Pro Wrestling Illustrated
  - Ranked No. 453 of the top 500 singles wrestlers in the PWI 500 in 2019
- World Championship Wrestling
  - WCW World Heavyweight Championship (1 time)
- WrestleCrap
  - Gooker Award (2000) Winning the WCW World Heavyweight Championship
- Wrestling Observer Newsletter
  - Most Disgusting Promotional Tactic (2000) Winning the WCW World Heavyweight Championship

=== Luchas de Apuestas record ===
Winner (wager)	Loser (wager)	Location	Event	Date	Notes
David Arquette and Tim Storm (Arquette's hair)	Jocephus and his Spiritual Advisor (Jocephus' hair)	Clarksville, Tennessee	NWA New Years Clash	January 5, 2019	

== Personal life ==
Arquette married his Scream co-star Courteney Cox on June 12, 1999. They have a daughter, Coco Arquette, born in June 2004. Jennifer Aniston is her godmother. On October 11, 2010, the media announced that Arquette and Cox were having a trial separation, but "still love each other deeply." In June 2012, Arquette filed for divorce after nearly two years of separation from Cox. The divorce became final in May 2013. He started dating Entertainment Tonight correspondent Christina McLarty in 2011. They announced they were expecting their first child together in November 2013. McLarty gave birth to the couple's son in 2014. The couple announced their engagement in July 2014. They were married on April 12, 2015. McLarty gave birth to their second son in 2017.

Arquette checked into a rehabilitation center for treatment of "alcohol and other issues" on January 1, 2011. On April 8, 2011, Arquette announced on The Tonight Show with Jay Leno that he had reached the 100-day sober milestone. Later that year, Arquette said he has been sober for over nine months. In June 2012, while in Israel to film an episode of the travel show Trippin, Arquette belatedly celebrated his Bar Mitzvah at the Western Wall. The presiding rabbi was Shmuel Rabinovitch.

== Legacy ==
The band the Black Math Experiment released "You Cannot Kill David Arquette" in 2005, a tongue in cheek song about Arquette's acting and wrestling career. Arquette himself helped promote the band on MTV's Total Request Live and during his promotional tour for The Tripper.

== Filmography ==
=== Film ===
Year	Title	Role	Notes
1992	Where the Day Takes You	Rob	
1992	Halfway House		Short film
1992	Cruel Doubt	Josh Duggan	
1992	Buffy the Vampire Slayer	Benny	
1993	An Ambush of Ghosts		
1993	Grey Knight	Murphy	
1993	At Home with the Webbers	Johnny Webber	
1994	Roadracers	Dude Delaney	
1994	Airheads	Carter	
1994	Frank & Jesse		
1995	Fall Time	David	
1995	Wild Bill	Jack McCall	
1996	Beautiful Girls	Bobby Conway	
1996	Skin and Bone	Buzz Head	
1996	Johns	John	
1996	Scream	Dewey Riley	
1997	Dream with the Fishes	Terry	
1997	The Alarmist	Tommy Hudler	
1997	Kiss & Tell	Skippy	
1997	Scream 2	Deputy Dewey Riley	
1998	RPM	Luke Delson	
1998	Free Money	Ned Jebee	
1999	Ravenous	Pvt. Cleaves	
1999	Never Been Kissed	Rob Geller	
1999	Muppets from Space	Dr. Tucker	Cameo
1999	The Runner	Bartender	
2000	Scream 3	Dewey Riley	
2000	Ready to Rumble	Gordie Boggs	
2001	3000 Miles to Graceland	Gus	
2001	See Spot Run	Gordon Smith	
2001	The Shrink Is In	Henry Popopolis	
2001	The Grey Zone	Hoffman	
2002	Eight Legged Freaks	Chris McCormick	
2002	It's a Very Merry Muppet Christmas Movie	Daniel	
2002	Happy Here and Now	Eddie	
2003	Essentially Naked	Gordie Boggs	Segment: "We're Not Gonna Take It"
2003	A Foreign Affair	Josh Adams	
2003	Stealing Sinatra	Barry Keenan	
2004	Never Die Alone	Paul	
2004	Riding the Bullet	George Staub	
2005	Slingshot	Ash	
2005	The Adventures of Sharkboy and Lavagirl in 3-D	Max's Dad	
2005	The Commuters	Peter	
2005	Dirt Squirrel	Dirt Squirrel	
2006	Time Bomb	Mike Bookman	
2006	The Darwin Awards	Harvey	
2006	The Tripper	Muff	Also director, writer, and producer
2008	Hamlet 2	Gary	
2008	Nosebleed		Short film
2008	The Butler's in Love	Robert	Short film
2010	Black Limousine	Jack	
2010	The Legend of Hallowdega	Kiyash Monsef	Short film
2011	Scream 4	Sheriff Dewey Riley	
2011	Conception	Paul Reynolds	
2011	Still Screaming: The Ultimate Scary Movie Retrospective	Himself	Documentary film
2012	The Cottage	Robert Mars	
2012	Then Smart One	Buddy Cooper	
2014	Sold	Sam	
2014	Just Before I Go	Vickie's Husband	Also producer
2014	Muffin Top: A Love Story	Cameron Scott	
2015	Field of Lost Shoes	Captain Henry A. DuPont	
2015	Bone Tomahawk	Purvis	
2016	Pee-wee's Big Holiday	DJ	
2017	Once Upon a Time in Venice	Diesel Stone	
2017	Amanda & Jack Go Glamping	Jack Spencer	
2018	High Voltage	Jimmy	
2018	Saving Flora	Henry	
2018	The Big Break	Lt. Ramirez	Short film
2018	Sk8 Dawg	Buddy (voice)	
2019	Mope	Rocket	
2019	The Old Man's Hands	Vinnie	Short film
2019	2099: The Soldier Protocol	Dr. Emmett Snyder	
2019	The MisEducation of Bindu	Bill	
2019	Mob Town	Sgt. Ed Croswell	
2020	Spree	Kris Kunkle	
2020	12 Hour Shift	Jefferson	Also producer
2020	Blackjack: The Jackie Ryan Story	Big Jack	
2020	You Cannot Kill David Arquette	Himself	Documentary; also executive producer
2021	Kid 90	Himself	Documentary
2021	Dr. Bird's Advice for Sad Poets	Xavier	
2021	Domino: Battle of the Bones	Walter	
2021	Ghosts of the Ozarks	Douglas	
2022	Scream	Dewey Riley	
2022	The Storied Life of A.J. Fikry	Lambiase	
2022	Quantum Cowboys	Colfax	
2022	On Sacred Ground	Elliot	
2023	The Good Half	Rick Barona	
2024	The Unholy Trinity	Father Jacob	
2025	Mob Cops	Sammy Canzano	
2025	The Perfect Gamble	Charlie	
2026	Scream 7	Dewey Riley	Cameo
2026	Evil Genius	TBA	
TBA	Kill Or Be Killed	TBA	
TBA	Green River Killer	TBA	Post-production
TBA	The Night Driver	Detective Granger	Post-production
TBA	Wreckless	Larry	Filming

=== Television ===
Year	Title	Role	Notes
1990	The Outsiders	Keith "Two-Bit" Mathews	13 episodes
1990–1991	Parenthood	Tod Hawks	12 episodes
1992	Blossom	David Slackmeir	Episode: "Only When I Laugh"
1992	Beverly Hills, 90210	Dennis "Diesel" Stone	Episode: "Wild Horses"
1994	Rebel Highway	Dude Delaney	Episode: "Roadracers"
1995	Double Rush	Hunter	13 episodes
1996	Dead Man's Walk	Augustus McCrae	Miniseries
1996	Friends	Malcolm	Episode: "The One with the Jam"
1999	The Hughleys	Mr. Smith	Episode: "The Curse of the Coyote Man"
2000–2002	Pelswick	Mr. Jimmy (voice)	26 episodes
2001–2002	Son of the Beach	Johnny Queefer	2 episodes
2003	Static Shock	Leech (voice)	Episode: "Romeo in the Mix"
2007	In Case of Emergency	Jason Ventress	13 episodes
2008	My Name Is Earl	Sweet Johnny	Episode: "Sweet Johnny"
2008–2009	Pushing Daisies	Randy Mann	4 episodes
2011	Medium	Michael "Lucky" Benoit	Episode: "Only Half Lucky"
2011	Scream: The Inside Story	Himself	Documentary film
2011–2016	Jake and the Never Land Pirates	Skully (voice)	Main cast
2012	Cougar Town	Daniel	Episodes: "My Life/Your World: Parts 1 & 2"
2012	Tron: Uprising	Link (voice)	5 episodes
2014	Happy Face Killer	Keith Jesperson	Television film
2014–2017	Celebrity Name Game	Himself	22 episodes; also executive producer
2016–2017	Sigmund and the Sea Monsters	Captain Barnabus	7 episodes (Amazon Studios)
2017	The Untitled Action Bronson Show	Himself	1 episode
2017	Drop the Mic	Himself	Episode: "David Arquette vs. Brian Tyree Henry / Jesse Tyler Ferguson vs. Chrissy Metz"
2017	Dice	Himself	2 episodes
2017	Bill Nye Saves the World	Hacked Support Group Member	Episode: "Your Computer is Under Attack"
2018	Championship Wrestling from Hollywood	Himself	Episode: "Hollywood meets Hollywood"
2018	Rob Riggle's Ski Master Academy	Himself	Episode: "Hog Hunt"
2019	Carter	Himself	Episode: "Harley Gets Replaced"
2019	Creepshow	Sheriff Deke	Episode: "Times is Tough in Musky Holler"
2021	Dark Side of the Ring		Episode: "Nick Gage"
2023	Mrs. Davis	Montgomery Abbott	2 episodes
2023	Barmageddon	Himself	Episode: "David Arquette vs. Colbie Caillat"
2023	This Fool	Kirk	Episode: "Feel the Payne"
2023	Tacoma FD	Teddy Dikosi	Episode: "Who Gives A-Shift?"
2025	Pee-Wee as Himself	Himself	Episode: "Part Two"
2026	Yo Gabba Gabbaland	Sonny the Squirrel	Episode: Try
TBA	Celebrity Million Dollar Secret	Contestant	

=== Web ===
Year	Title	Role	Notes
2013–2014	Cleaners	Frank Barnes	Main role (18 episodes)
2015	Wrestling Isn't Wrestling	Himself	Short film

=== Music videos ===
Year	Title	Artist(s)	Role	Ref.
2000	"What If"	Creed	Deputy Dewey Riley	
2010	"Why Wait"	Rascal Flatts	—N/a	
2014	"Imagine" (UNICEF: World version)	Various	Himself	
2018	"Give Me Your Hand"	Shannon K	Himself	
2019	"Red Bull and Hennessy"	Jenny Lewis	Himself	
2023	"Lust & Purity"	GXTP	—N/a	
2026	"Twisting the Knife" (Parts 1 & 2)	Ice Nine Kills featuring Mckenna Grace	Himself	

=== Video games ===
Year	Title	Voice role	Notes
2001	SSX Tricky	Eddie Wachowski	
2004	ESPN NFL 2K5	Himself	
2022	The Quarry	Chris Hackett	Voice, motion capture, and likeness

== Awards and nominations ==
Year	Title	Association	Category	Result	Ref
1998	Scream 2	Blockbuster Entertainment Awards	Favorite Actor – Horror	Won	
1998	n/a	Ft. Lauderdale International Film Festival	Star on the Horizon	Won	
2000	Never Been Kissed	Blockbuster Entertainment Awards	Favorite Supporting Actor – Comedy/Romance	Won	
2000	Scream 3	Teen Choice Awards	Choice Movie – Chemistry (shared with Courteney Cox)	Won	
2001	Scream 3	Blockbuster Entertainment Awards	Favorite Actor – Horror	Won	
2011	—N/a	Eyegore Awards		Won	
2014	Cleaners	International Academy of Web Television Awards	Best Male Performance in a Drama	Nominated	
2014	Cleaners	Streamy Awards	Best Actor in a Drama	Nominated	
2015	Jake and the Never Land Pirates	Behind the Voice Actors Awards	Best Vocal Ensemble in a Television Series – Children's Educational	Nominated	
2016	Evan's Crime	Breckenridge Film Festival	Best Supporting Actor	Won	
2017	Celebrity Name Game	Daytime Emmy Awards	Outstanding Game Show	Nominated	
2018	Amanda & Jack Go Glamping	Deep in the Heart Film Festival	Best Actor – Feature	Won	

== See also ==
- List of Jewish professional wrestlers
