= Celebrity Name Game =

American syndicated game show (2014–2017)

- Genre: Game show
- Based on: Identity Crisis by: Laura Robinson; Richard Gerrits
- Directed by: Ivan Dudynsky
- Presented by: Craig Ferguson
- Theme music composer: Tim Mosher & Stoker
- Country of origin: United States
- Original language: English
- No. of seasons: 3
- No. of episodes: 257

Production
- Executive producers: Courteney Cox; David Arquette; Craig Ferguson; Thom Beers; Jennifer Mullin; Scott St. John; John Quinn; Richard Gerrits; Laura Robinson
- Production locations: Sunset Bronson Studios, Hollywood, California (2014–15); Raleigh Studios, Hollywood (2015–16); CBS Studio Center, Studio City, California (2016–17)
- Editors: Stacie Dekker; Daniel Wincentsen; Jason Gill; Victor Gonzaga
- Running time: 22 minutes
- Production companies: Coquette Productions; Entertain the Brutes; Green Mountain West Inc.; CBS Television Studios; FremantleMedia North America; Debmar-Mercury

Original release
- Network: Syndicated
- Release: September 22, 2014 – February 28, 2017

Celebrity Name Game is an American syndicated game show that premiered on September 22, 2014. Based on the board game Identity Crisis (created by Laura Robinson and Richard Gerrits), the series was developed by Courteney Cox and David Arquette's Coquette Productions and was originally pitched as a primetime series for CBS with Craig Ferguson as host. The series was later picked up by FremantleMedia and Debmar-Mercury as a syndicated series for 2014 with Ferguson, who left The Late Late Show on December 19, 2014, remaining as host as well as an executive producer. The series marked Coquette's first foray into game shows. The show was subsequently renewed for a second season, which premiered on September 21, 2015.

Ferguson has won two Daytime Emmy Awards for Outstanding Game Show Host in 2015 and 2016. He was nominated once again in 2017.

On December 2, 2016, the series was cancelled after three seasons. The final episode aired on February 28, 2017.

== Gameplay ==
=== Main game ===
The game involves two teams, each consisting of two contestants who are related or know each other. They are joined by two guest celebrities who assist the teams for all but the third segment of the show, attempting to identify the names of popular culture subjects like celebrities, fictional characters, place names, or film and television titles.

In the first two rounds, each team is assigned one of the celebrities, who then will switch teams for the second round. Each of the three-member teams are presented with a category containing ten names. One person will give clues, trying to get the other two to guess the names. Successful guesses earn money. An illegal clue (saying the name or part of the name, spelling the name, or rhyming the name) voids that name; however, clue givers can repeat portions of the name already given. Each turn lasts for 45 seconds. In the first round, one team is chosen to play first, and chooses one of two categories presented, leaving the second team to play the remaining category. In the second round, the second team plays first and chooses the first category.

In round one, the celebrity gives the clues while turning back and forth to alternately face each contestant, and each correct answer is worth $100, up to $1,000 total. In round two, one of the two contestants gives clues while alternately facing either the remaining partner or the assigned celebrity, and each answer is worth $200, up to $2,000 total.

In the third round, the contestants go head to head while Ferguson gives the clues to names under a specific category. The contestants buzz in to make a guess. If neither contestant buzzes in after a while, Ferguson can start giving out clues that are normally illegal, all the way up to simply saying the name. A right answer earns money for the team that answered, but a wrong answer grants the money to the opponent. The first answer is worth $100 and each successive answer increases in value by $100. Winnings in this round are added to the money accumulated in the first two rounds, and whichever team reaches $3,000 or more first is the winner, keeps the cash, and goes on to the bonus round to play for the prize of $20,000. If no team reaches $3,000 before time is called, the team in the lead at the end of the round wins the game. If the game ends in a tie, one final name is given; a team who buzzes in with a correct answer wins the game, but a wrong answer results in an automatic loss.

=== Bonus Round ===
In the bonus round, there is no particular category. The names are hidden behind ten numbered squares. Some of them hide pictures of the person, character, or thing. The contestants take turns giving the clues to both celebrities. One contestant is placed in a soundproof booth while the other gives clues. The current giver starts describing when a name or picture is exposed. If the celebrity receivers get it right, the name stays revealed. Passing on a name re-conceals it. The first contestant has 45 seconds, while the second has an additional 30 seconds, if needed. If the first clue giver provides an illegal clue to a name, that name is replaced by a different one for the second clue giver. Any illegal clue by the second clue giver, however, results in an automatic loss. Getting all ten increases the team's total winnings to $20,000. Otherwise, the team takes home only their main game winnings.

== Production ==
In June 2011, it was reported that Courteney Cox and David Arquette's Coquette Productions were preparing to pilot a new, hour-long game show for CBS's primetime lineup known as Identity Crisis, based on a board game of the same name produced by Out and About Productions. Scott St. John, known for his work on Deal or No Deal and 1 vs. 100, was brought on as a showrunner. CBS selected Craig Ferguson, host of the network's late night talk show The Late Late Show, to be host and producer for the pilot.

The series resurfaced in October 2013 under the title Celebrity Name Game, with the announcement that FremantleMedia and Debmar-Mercury would syndicate the new series for the 2014–15 television season. Fremantle's CEO Thom Beers described Celebrity Name Game as a "hilarious and innovative rapid-fire game show that combines the best of pop culture with the best of comedy." Ferguson remained with the project through its transition to syndication, considering it to be "a wonderful concept with such great potential, from two of my favorite people". Ferguson later announced in April 2014 that he would step down as host of The Late Late Show in December 2014. Debmar-Mercury and Fremantle planned to market the new series to station owners as a complement to Family Feud—whose current incarnation, hosted by fellow comedian Steve Harvey, has been a ratings success for the two companies.

In November 2013, Tribune Broadcasting picked up Celebrity Name Game for its stations, giving it clearance across 40% of U.S. households and seven of the top ten media markets. In December 2013, it reached 80% of households through additional deals with CBS Television Stations and Sinclair Broadcast Group; episodes were also added to the primetime national clearance slate of MyNetworkTV. In Canada, Celebrity Name Game airs on City and GameTV. The series was renewed for a second season on January 8, 2015. On December 2, 2016, it was announced that the series would not return for a fourth season. The series' final new episode aired on February 28, 2017.

== Merchandise ==
A board game based on the show featuring Craig Ferguson on the cover was released by PlayMonster (formerly Patch) in 2016.

This was the third home game that was based on a board game itself, the first was TV Scrabble by Selchow and Righter in 1987 followed by Trivial Pursuit Game Show by Parker Brothers in 1993.

== International versions ==
A Portuguese version of the show called Duelo das Estrelas (Duel of the Stars) hosted by Silvio Nascimento aired on MundoFox in 2016.

An Australian version was commissioned by Network Ten in 2018 and aired from May 13, 2019, until March 16, 2020. It was hosted by Grant Denyer, who previously presented the most recent Australian version of Family Feud.

Country	Name	Host	Network	Date premiered
Australia	Celebrity Name Game	Grant Denyer	Network 10	May 13, 2019 – March 16, 2020
Portugal	Duelo das Estrelas	Silvio Nacimiento	MundoFox	2016

== Reruns ==
Reruns of the show have aired on Pop and Buzzr. On February 9, 2026 the show returned to Buzzr and is currently airing weekdays at 1pm ET.

== Accolades ==
- 2015–2016: Daytime Emmy Award for Outstanding Game Show Host

== See also ==
- Hollywood Game Night
- Time's Up!
