= Daisy Does America =

American comedy series (2005–2006)

- Created by: Daisy Donovan
- Directed by: George Ratliff; Ivan Victor
- Presented by: Daisy Donovan
- Music by: Wendell Yuponce
- Country of origin: United States
- Original language: English
- No. of seasons: 1
- No. of episodes: 9

Production
- Executive producers: David Arquette; Jim Biederman; Courteney Cox; Daisy Donovan; Alek Keshishian
- Producers: Stephan Castagnola; Emma Glassar; Gil Ilan; Thea Mann; J.C. Plummer
- Editor: Ivan Victor
- Camera setup: Single-camera
- Running time: 22 minutes
- Production company: Coquette Productions

Original release
- Network: TBS
- Release: December 6, 2005 – January 24, 2006

Daisy Does America is an American travel hybrid reality/comedy series that premiered on TBS from December 6, 2005 to January 24, 2006. The show, similar to British actress and comedian Daisy Donovan's previous outing for British television Daisy, Daisy, was adapted for US audiences by actors Courteney Cox and David Arquette for their company Coquette Productions.

In this unscripted program, Donovan attempts to follow the "American Dream" by blending in with ordinary people while at the same time poking fun at the individuals with whom she is working.

Daisy Does America aired on LIVING2 in the UK, TV2 in New Zealand and UKTV in Australia.

== Concept ==
Similar in concept to Da Ali G Show, Daisy features a confused Brit who asks irreverent questions of unsuspecting Americans.

== Episode guide ==
No.	Title	Directed by	Written by	Original release date	Prod. code	U.S. viewers (millions)
1	"Bounty Hunter"	Ivan Victor	N/A	December 6, 2005	TBA	1.20
2	"Country and Western"	Unknown	N/A	December 13, 2005	TBA	N/A
3	"Rap"	Unknown	N/A	December 20, 2005	TBA	N/A
4	"Pageant Contestant"	George Ratliff	N/A	December 27, 2005	TBA	N/A
5	"Dog Show Handler"	Unknown	N/A	December 27, 2005	TBA	N/A
6	"Wedding Planner"	George Ratliff	N/A	January 3, 2006	TBA	N/A
7	"Poker"	Ivan Victor	N/A	January 10, 2006	TBA	N/A
8	"Psychic"	Unknown	N/A	January 17, 2006	TBA	N/A
9	"Magician's Assistant"	Unknown	N/A	January 24, 2006	TBA	N/A
