= The Tripper =

- Promotional poster
- Directed by: David Arquette
- Written by: David Arquette; Joe Harris
- Produced by: Courteney Cox Arquette; Evan Astrowsky; David Arquette; Navin Narang; Neil A. Machlis
- Starring: Jaime King; Thomas Jane; Lukas Haas
- Cinematography: Bobby Bukowski
- Edited by: Glenn Garland
- Music by: Jimmy Haun; David Wittman
- Production companies: Coquette Productions; Raw Entertainment
- Distributed by: NaVinci Films
- Release dates: October 13, 2006 (ScreamFest); April 20, 2007 (United States)
- Running time: 97 minutes
- Country: United States
- Language: English

The Tripper is a 2006 American comedy slasher film directed by David Arquette. Starring Jaime King, Thomas Jane and Lukas Haas and follows a group of hippies at a music festival who get stalked by a madman dressed up like Ronald Reagan.

The film, Arquette's directorial debut. The film took inspiration from Reagan's opposition to the environmental movement. Reagan's defunding of mental institutions through the Mental Health Systems Act of 1980 is a major plot point, as the killer is one of the mental patients released due to the effects of the Act. Arquette intended the film to be a commentary on the policies of the Reagan Era.

== Plot ==
In 1967, a young boy is watching a news report on TV of then-governor of California Ronald Reagan railing against the environmentalist movement. The boy's father, a local logger named Dylan Riggs, faces resistance from a group of tree-hugging hippies who will not allow him to clear the forest, despite how he needs the money to buy medicine for his ailing wife. A standoff between Dylan and the hippies ensues, following which Dylan's disturbed son takes a chainsaw to the neck of one of the protesters. The son is taken to a mental institution.

39 years later, a group of friends—Joey, Ivan, Samantha, Linda, Jade, and Jack—are driving through the woods to the American Free Love Festival (a modern-day Woodstock festival) for a weekend of debauchery. During the journey, the group stops at a gas station to pick up supplies, only to run into a group of older hooligans who begin threatening them. A fight ensues which sees an older man named Gus breaking the arm of one of the hooligans.

Meanwhile, Frank Baker, the organizer of the event, is preparing for the festival, despite local police officer Buzz Hall reminding him that a girl had died at the one held the previous year. The festival begins anyway, but one festival-goer gets killed by an unseen figure after wandering into the woods by himself. The next day, Linda and Joey head off into the woods by themselves to have sex, only to be ambushed by the hooligans with paintball guns. Suddenly, a man dressed like Ronald Reagan appears and murders all five of them.

Back at the festival, the headless body of an older hippie (killed earlier by Reagan) is found hanging from a tree. Buzz quickly orders the festival to be shut down and tells the attendees to go home, much to the chagrin of Baker. Since Joey had the keys to their van, Samantha goes off looking for him, only to find a car belonging to her abusive ex-boyfriend Jimmy (whom she thinks has been following her over the past few days). Frightened, she flees back to the van, only to find that Jack and Jade have been murdered. Jimmy suddenly appears, holding a gun to Ivan's neck. Samantha confronts Jimmy, accusing him of murdering the others, but then Reagan appears and kills Jimmy and Ivan, upon which Samantha flees.

Meanwhile, Buzz, believing Dylan Riggs to be the killer, heads out to his shack, where he finds Dylan seemingly cutting up the bodies of the murdered victims. A chase begins, but it quickly ends after Dylan accidentally falls into his own punji stick trap, killing himself. Elsewhere, Reagan begins pursuing Baker, but he manages to escape by hiding in an outhouse toilet. Reagan then goes back to chasing after Samantha, when Buzz appears and shoots him down, seemingly killing him. Suddenly, Reagan pops back up, but Samantha is able to beat him down again with a hammer, knocking him out. She then unmasks the killer, revealing him to be Gus, the man from the gas station who was also the son of Dylan who was inadvertently freed by the actual president when he defunded mental institutions in 1981.

The next morning, Samantha is escorted away from the woods by law enforcement, although Buzz learns that Gus's body wasn't found where it should have been. Meanwhile, Baker re-emerges from the outhouse and wanders off with his money into the woods, where Gus suddenly appears and murders him with a chainsaw.

== Cast ==
- Jaime King as Samantha / Sam
- Thomas Jane as Buzz Hall
- Lukas Haas as Ivan
- Jason Mewes as Joey
- Balthazar Getty as Jimmy
- Marsha Thomason as Linda
- Rick Overton as Mayor Hal Burton
- Paul Reubens as Frank Baker
- Richmond Arquette as Deputy Cooper
- David Arquette as Muff
- Courteney Cox Arquette as Cynthia
- Christopher Allen Nelson as Gus Riggs / Ronald Reagan
  - Noah Maschan as Young Gus
- Stephen Heath as Jack
- Paz de la Huerta as Jade
- Redmond Gleeson as Dylan
- Michael X. Sommers as Trooper Neatnick
- Wes Craven as hippie (cameo)
- Fishbone as themselves

== Production ==
David Arquette came up with the idea for the film when he was at a reggae concert in Northern California. "We're surrounded by redwood trees and the redwood trees are always so creepy anyway. And I thought it would be crazy if a madman came out of the woods and started hacking up all these hippies," said Arquette.

Arquette decided to make the killer obsessed with Ronald Reagan because he wanted the film to be a commentary on Reagan era- policies. Said Arquette, "Reagan was president, and governor while I was growing up in California and I remember for the first time I saw homeless people everywhere and that was due to cuts in mental health that he did. Then after that, I saw a Reagan mask at one point...I was like 'oh, wait a second.' It reminded me of… William Shatner's mask that they used to be Michael Myers, so from there on it all kind of came together." Arquette wrote the script with Joe Harris, adding elements of political satire.

The Tripper was shot in Boulder Creek. The redwood mountains of Santa Cruz, California.

In August 2007, writer-producer Fritz Jünker sued the Arquettes' production company, Coquette Productions, Inc., for copyright infringement, claiming Jünker's 2001 film, The Truth About Beef Jerky, was the basis for The Tripper. The Truth About Beef Jerky was also shot in the same state park north of Santa Cruz, several years before The Tripper. The case never went to court and was eventually dropped, because Jünker could not afford to take the case to court.

== Reception ==
=== Release ===
The film had its world premiere at the Screamfest Horror Film Festival on October 13, 2006. It was also shown as a bonus film as part of 2006's After Dark Horrorfest. On April 19, 2007, the film premiered at the Del Mar Theater in Santa Cruz, with Arquette and fellow cast members present for an audience Q&A. The film received a limited theatrical release the following day on April 20, a reference to 420 in cannabis culture which is a theme of the film.

The Canadian premiere of The Tripper was at Fantasia Festival in 2007.

The MPAA rating system gave the film an R rating for strong horror violence and graphic violence, drug content, language, and some sexuality/nudity.

=== Critical reception ===
On review aggregator Rotten Tomatoes, The Tripper has an approval rating of 40% based on 15 reviews.

In his review for Variety, Justin Chang wrote, "For anyone who's ever wanted to see a bunch of 'shroom-smoking, free-love-espousing flower children get picked off one by one, 'The Tripper' has undeniable appeal. But the cynical script by Arquette and Joe Harris also has various axes to grind with conservatives, the Iraq War and, most pointedly (and absurdly), Reagan's policies toward mental patients. Don't be fooled by the semi-serious veneer; this is a movie whose idea of political humor is an attack dog named Nancy."

Brian Holcomb of CinemaBlend said the film's real strength is "a good-natured and modest sense of mischievous fun. It's a dumb movie made by a director smart enough to recognize absurdity when he sees it." In his review of the DVD, MovieWeb's Evan Jacobs said the film is "a nostalgic homage to the exploitation films of Wes Craven and Tobe Hooper." Criticisms of the film were that it succumbs to slasher film clichés, as well as that it has a lack of scares. Film Threat wrote, "While the film has some genuinely cutting observations about both liberals and conservatives to make, the aforementioned middle contains too many scenes of people either doing drugs or dancing; and too few (in fact, almost none) of the biting satire that fueled the first act. Not until the ending do we get a whiff of what made it great earlier."

== Home media ==
The DVD was released on October 23, 2007, as an unrated version, with 4 minutes not seen in the theatrical cut. The DVD includes audio commentary by cast and crew, deleted scenes, and behind-the-scenes featurettes.

== Comic book ==
Image Comics, in conjunction with Raw Studios, published the Tripper comic adaptation David Arquette's The Tripper during May 2007 in its first edition. David Arquette is credited with the story, alongside Joe Harris, who adapted the concept for the comic medium with artist Nat Jones.
