= Dirt (TV series) =

American television series

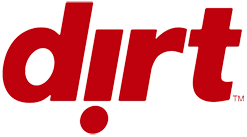
- Also known as: D!rt
- Genre: Drama
- Created by: Matthew Carnahan
- Starring: Courteney Cox; Ian Hart; Laura Allen; Will McCormack; Josh Stewart; Jeffrey Nordling; Alexandra Breckenridge
- Opening theme: Season 1: "Dig Deep" by Debby Holiday; Season 2: "Twinkle Twinkle Little Star" by Emma Ejwertz
- Country of origin: United States
- Original language: English
- No. of seasons: 2
- No. of episodes: 20

Production
- Executive producers: Matthew Carnahan; David Arquette; Courteney Cox
- Running time: 40-60 minutes
- Production companies: FX Productions; Coquette Productions; Matthew Carnahan Circus Products; ABC Studios (Note: Credited as Touchstone Television in season 1)

Original release
- Network: FX
- Release: January 2, 2007 – April 13, 2008

Dirt (styled d!rt for logos) is an American television series broadcast on the FX network. It premiered on January 2, 2007, and starred Courteney Cox as Lucy Spiller, the editor-in-chief of the first-of-its-kind "glossy tabloid" magazine DirtNow. A 13-episode second and final season was announced on May 8, 2007. However, only seven episodes were produced before the 2007 WGA strike shut down production. The shortened second season began airing on March 2, 2008.

Dirt was created by Matthew Carnahan and produced by Coquette Productions in association with ABC Studios. On June 8, 2008, FX canceled the series after two seasons.

== Plot ==
=== Season one ===
The series revolves around Lucy Spiller and her best friend, the freelance photographer Don Konkey, who aids Lucy in her career as editor-in-chief of Dirt and Now Magazines, which Lucy merges into a single magazine at the end of the second episode due to budget issues. Most episodes focus upon Lucy's never-ending quest to find new news stories regarding celebrities, with help of her staff of reporters and photographers, most notably Don and the young upstart writer Willa McPherson.

As the series progresses, more is learned about Lucy and Don's personal lives. Don is a man with schizophrenia, who regularly hallucinates and hears voices, which is often filtered through his sense of guilt over the questionable actions he takes in order to help Lucy land her stories and the fall-out that comes from exposing people's dark secrets. Lucy meanwhile is a secretly depressed person whose life is totally devoted towards the magazine, to the extent of forgoing any sort of social life whatsoever. Her relationship with her family is strained, in part due to the mysterious suicide of her father, which haunts Lucy due to the cryptic suicide note that he left her, which she kept from the rest of her family.

One of the main subplots of season one is Lucy and Don's relationship with Holt McLaren and the love triangle that erupts between Lucy, Holt, and Holt's current girlfriend Julia Mallory, a popular sitcom star who has begun breaking out into horrible movies while Holt's career has tanked after a series of movies he has done, flopped. In an attempt to convert Holt into a secret source for potential stories, Lucy offers to use the full resources of her magazine to revive Holt's career. In exchange, Holt reveals that Julia's best friend is pregnant after a one-night stand with a fellow actor. The actress overdoses (whether intentional or not is never fully revealed), then has a brain aneurysm and dies. Holt, feeling guilt after hearing of the actress' death, has a mini-breakdown while driving and gets into a high-speed car crash, nearly killing himself and Julia. Julia suffers severe injuries, which leads to an addiction to painkillers and eventually a full-blown drug addiction. To revive her career and gain public sympathy, Julia secretly obtains and leaks a copy of a sex tape of her and a co-star and falsely accuses her co-star of rape, though Lucy exposes her lies in her vault of secrets.

As Holt's star rises and his girlfriend's plummets, Holt and Lucy begin a relationship which is exposed to Julia by a rival magazine editor/friend of Lucy's. Julia ultimately realizes that Lucy has helped ruined her life and attacks her with a knife, leaving Lucy bleeding to death. Contacting Don, season one ends with Lucy ordering Don to take photos of her lying on the ground bleeding, in order to ensure that her magazine will be able to have the ugly photos for the story on the attempt on her life.

=== Season two ===
Season two opens with Lucy surviving the attempt on her life and Julia dying. Returning to work with a young idealistic male writer she met and hires during her stay at the hospital, Lucy finds the magazine floundering without her hard driving leadership. While Lucy's boss Brent arranges for the sale of the magazine to a womanizing, pill-popping foreign investor, Lucy blackmails a down-on-her-luck pop star, Sharlee Cates, to hire Don (now back on his medication) as her personal photographer in order to keep tabs on her. This causes problems between Don and Lucy, as Don becomes friends with the singer, whose marriage collapses upon the revelation that her ex-husband is sleeping with his first wife and only married the singer in order to divorce her and take half her fortune. Lucy, on the other hand, wants to use his friendship with Sharlee to exploit her problems, including the cutting off of her hair, divorce, and her confrontation with a pop legend, Mia, at an awards show. Meanwhile, Lucy's new hire, Farber, begins a relationship with Willa, who betrays him in order to break the story involving a former child-star friend of her new boyfriend, who was caught soliciting sex from an undercover officer. After an awards show, Brent dies from carbon monoxide poisoning, caused by passing out in his still-running car.

Holt begins work on a new film project and struggles to deal with pretending to be in mourning over his deceased girlfriend while lusting after Lucy. Lucy begins to date a powerful studio executive, but it ends after he suspects Lucy would rather be involved with Holt. Lucy's mother dies during a botched plastic surgery procedure, Lucy agrees to Holt's ultimatum that they go public with their relationship after he completes work on his new movie.

== Characters ==
=== Main ===
- Lucy Spiller (Courteney Cox) – Lucy Spiller is the pivotal character of the show. She runs the magazine DirtNow, (previously two separate magazines), which is marketed as a respectable tabloid. Lucy is a workaholic with a brilliant eye for a story and little remorse about the lives she tangles with. She is constantly burdened with the guilt of the suicide of her father and the feelings of loneliness which stem from this. She does however, truly love her best friend Don Konkey and her brother Leo. For Don, she goes to great lengths to keep him healthy – on his medication, and she and her brother are also close. She finds herself unable to reach orgasm with anything other than her vibrator until she meets Holt McLaren.
- Don Konkey (Ian Hart) – Don Konkey was in the journalism club with Lucy during college, and as such is the only character revealed she has a true bond with. Don does exceptional photography work, and is so committed to Lucy that he severed one of his own fingers to get a shot. He has manageable schizophrenia, and is often reluctant to take medication, even at the request of Lucy.
- Holt McLaren (Josh Stewart) – At the beginning of the series, Holt McLaren was a has-been actor whose only claim to fame was his long past blockbusters and his girlfriend, Julia Mallory. After telling Lucy about Kira Klay's pregnancy in episode one, she agreed to do a profile about him in her magazine "Now" when it was still a single entity. After that, he received multiple offerings from movie studios and is currently working under contract on a big-budget action film. He is also Lucy's love interest.
- Willa McPherson (Alexandra Breckenridge) – Willa McPherson is a reporter under Lucy who is frequently on thin ice with her and definitely the most important recurring character. She goes to great lengths to get stories for Lucy, much as Don does to get photos. In various episodes, she takes drugs, submits to sexual advances and befriends the mentally unstable to further the goals of the magazine. She was involved in a casual relationship with Brent Barrow in season 1 and a romantic relationship with Farber Kauffman late in season 2.
- Julia Mallory (Laura Allen) – At the start of the series, Julia Mallory is "America's sweetheart", but as DirtNow destroys her career, the series tracks her character's degeneration, pain and corruption. Julia is an actress dating actor Holt McLaren. She hurt her back in episode one after Holt crashed their car at 90 miles an hour following the news of Kira Klay's death. She has since developed various problems – narcotic, sexual, physical and mental, which led to the collapse of her career and her eventual death. Julia was hit by Leo in his car, which killed her and gave Lucy her first cover after returning from the hospital.
- Leo Spiller (Will McCormack) – Leo is Lucy's younger brother, to whom she is reasonably close. He appeared to cope with their father's suicide slightly better than she has, and is closer to their mother than her. He finds his sister's line of work destructive and shallow. He identifies himself as bisexual, although his sister argues that he is gay and in denial. He has a search for peace and disapproves very much of his sister's career, especially after an incident with a closeted A-list celebrity, Jack Dawson. Along with Brent Barrow, Leo was a central character in Season One but remains a mostly unseen character in season two.

=== Supporting ===
- Brent Barrow (Jeffrey Nordling) – DirtNow's publisher. He is very constricting when it comes to content and schedule issues. Throughout the series he has threatened Lucy with termination from her position as their interests conflict. Brent is rarely seen in season two, and dies in the season 2 (and series) finale.
- Sharlee Cates (Ashley Johnson) – An obvious parody of Britney Spears, she soon begins a friendship with Don Konkey during the Breakdown of her marriage.
- Tina Harrod (Jennifer Aniston) – A rival magazine editor. She is Lucy's arch rival, former friend and brief lover when they were younger. Though she has been mentioned several times in the first season, Tina's only appearance was in the season 1 finale.
- Prince Tyreese (Rick Fox) – A basketball star who gets photographed and later blackmailed after committing adultery. After Brent Barrow (under the threat of having his penis cut off, cooked and fed to him by Tweetie McDaniel) reveals that it was Prince Tyreese that leaked the information of how Tweetie killed music artist Aundre G, he is badly beaten by Tweetie and his men. In the second season, he returns and appears to have written a book about how his loss of a basketball career helped him open his eyes to what is important in life.
- Gibson Horne (Timothy Bottoms) – Lucy and Brent's boss and owner of DirtNow, he is in charge of publication and seems to be the highest ranking character introduced on the show so far. He has little to do with DirtNow, only stepping in occasionally as Brent has a more hands-on job of overseeing the magazine.
- Garbo (Carly Pope) – A high-profile lesbian drug dealer for many actors and actresses. She and Julia Mallory had a short-lived sexual relationship prior to her rehab visit but Garbo falls in love with Julia. Her name is possibly a reference to bisexual 1920s superstar actress Greta Garbo.
- Jack Dawson (Grant Show) – A famous actor who is in the closet and secretly seeing Leo Spiller. After Leo catches him with his personal trainer he retaliates by taking the information regarding the relationship to Lucy who in turn outs him in DirtNow.
- Johnny Gage (Johann Urb) – Johnny is a celebrity who worked alongside Julia and Holt. Johnny was labeled as the bad guy when it was revealed that he had made a sex tape of himself and Julia. Johnny was also involved in the hostage situation at the Dirt Now studio.
- Kira Klay (Shannyn Sossamon) – A troubled young drug-addicted actress who died of a brain injury. Her death happens in the pilot, where that is the only episode she is "alive." Kira appears in later episodes as a ghostly figment of Don's imagination and becoming a sort of love interest.
- Farber Kauffman (Ryan Eggold) – A reporter, whose penchant for rule bending got him a job at Dirt. In the second season, he has a sexual relationship with Willa.

== Production ==
The first season consisted of 13 one-hour-long episodes. Production on the pilot began in Los Angeles in March 2006, but it was later reshot to include a cameo by David Fincher and to add more of Courteney Cox's character. Production on the series began in September 2006.

Dirt was the ninth drama series pilot shot for FX. Courteney Cox and David Arquette served as the show's executive producers.

== Episodes ==
=== Series overview ===
Season	Episodes	Originally released	
Season	Episodes	First released	Last released
1	13	January 2, 2007	March 27, 2007
2	7	March 2, 2008	April 13, 2008

=== Season 1 (2007) ===
No. overall	No. in season	Title	Directed by	Written by	Original release date	US viewers (millions)
1	1	"Pilot"	Matthew Carnahan	Matthew Carnahan	January 2, 2007	4.00
Courteney Cox stars as ruthless tabloid editor Lucy Spiller, who's masterful at using threats and manipulation to dig up dirt, aided by resourceful paparazzo Don Konkey. Lucy zeroes in on struggling actor Holt McLaren, who needs favorable publicity and whose rising-star girlfriend, Julia Mallory, is well-connected.
2	2	"Blogan"	Chris Long	Matthew Carnahan	January 9, 2007	3.75
Lucy sends Don to shoot Kira Klay's corpse, but Kira looks all too lively to him. Don also gets a visit from Prince Tyreese, but it's not exactly a courtesy call. Meanwhile, Holt looks for ways to help Julia, and Willa shows journalistic spunk in tracking down dirt on a Hollywood power couple known as "Blogan."
3	3	"Ovophagy"	Paris Barclay	Joel Fields	January 16, 2007	1.9
"Dirt Now" is about to launch, and Lucy needs a cover story. Lucy suspects that drugs made an ailing Christian-pop star sick and dispatches Don to get the dirt. Meanwhile, Holt is courted by a major producer while Julia has a hard time back on the set of her sitcom.
4	4	"What to Expect When You're Expecting"	Paris Barclay	Dawn Prestwich & Nicole Yorkin	January 23, 2007	1.9
Lucy blackmails basketball star Prince Tyreese into helping her track down a missing rap star; Lucy and Leo's mother announces her plans to remarry on the anniversary of their father's suicide.
5	5	"You Don't Know Jack"	Chris Long	Dave Flebotte	January 30, 2007	2.16
Lucy publishes photos of action-movie star Jack Dawson in the arms of her brother Leo; menacing visitors threaten Brent Barrow to reveal Lucy's source about the murder of Aundre G; Julia interrupts a photo shoot for Holt.
6	6	"The Secret Lives of Altar Girls"	Jesse Bochco	Joel Fields	February 6, 2007	1.42
Lucy delegates her onetime mentor to help Willa investigate the murder of a teenage girl in a small California town. In the meantime, Holt and Lucy's growing attraction towards each other is consummated in a limousine, and Julia falls into the arms of Garbo, and deeper into drugs. The music playing in the Lucy and Holt limo scene is "Allelujah" by K.I.A. Paul Reubens guest stars.
7	7	"Come Together"	Adam Arkin	Rebecca Dameron	February 13, 2007	1.58
When her source takes back her story, Willa's excitement over her first story fades. In the meantime Lucy's relationship with Leo and her coming with DirtNow are jeopardized by Jack Dawson's lawsuit. Don becomes involved with a waitress. Paul Reubens guest stars. Sully Erna of Godsmack appears in an uncredited role.
8	8	"The Thing Under the Bed"	Dean White	Sally Robinson	February 20, 2007	1.42
Lucy has trouble sleeping. Willa teams up with Don to uncover a secret celebrity wedding. Julia deals with rehab while Holt deals with his career. Note: Lucy states 'I don't like dancing in the dark', an inside joke referring to Courteney Cox's appearance in the video for Bruce Springsteen's 'Dancing in the Dark'
9	9	"This is Not Your Father's Hostage Situation"	Elodie Keene	Dave Flebotte	February 27, 2007	1.36
A former child star takes the magazine staff hostage, forcing them to produce an entire issue about him. In the meantime, Lucy wonders if he is really a threat or simply a harmless has-been looking for publicity. Vincent Gallo guest stars.
10	10	"The Sexxx Issue"	Lev L. Spiro	Matthew Carnahan	March 6, 2007	1.42
Lucy proposes a sex-themed issue as a means of getting the staff to relax after the hostage situation. In the meantime, Brent and Willa find themselves in a compromising position with a girl whose father wishes to turn into a star, and Don faces his intimacy problem with Abby.
11	11	"Pap Smeared"	Chris Long	Albert Kim	March 13, 2007	1.7
A young photographer offers to help Don; Julia discovers Hollywood has moved on without her; Holt fears his relationship with Lucy might be exposed. Lukas Haas guest stars.
12	12	"Caught on Tape"	Fred Keller	Joel Fields	March 20, 2007	1.79
Julia is horrified when a sex tape of her and a former co-star turns up on the Internet; Don gets a mysterious assignment; Lucy relies on Willa. Perez Hilton guest stars.
13	13	"Ita Missa Est"	Matthew Carnahan	Matthew Carnahan	March 27, 2007	2.4
Jennifer Aniston guest stars as rival Tina Harrod, a magazine editor that butts heads with Lucy. Lucy's stalker is revealed and Julia learns about Holt's relationship with Lucy.

=== Season 2 (2008) ===
FX announced on May 8, 2007, that Dirt would return for a second season.

No. overall	No. in season	Title	Directed by	Written by	Original release date
14	1	"Welcome to Normal"	Matthew Carnahan	Matthew Carnahan	March 2, 2008
After surviving her violent attack, Lucy Spiller returns to Dirt Now magazine to reclaim her position as Tabloid Queen. Julia, while fleeing the scene, is hit by Leo and killed. Don begins to experience life on medication. A chance encounter between Lucy and a young pop star results in a surprising opportunity. Lucy digs for truth about a famous heiress about to have a baby. A new male reporter joins the staff.
15	2	"Dirty Slutty Whores"	Stephen T. Kay	Joel Fields	March 9, 2008
Lucy is on the lookout for answers when a celebrity is released from jail early. Meanwhile, Willa and Farber search for the source of a self-destructive star's video.
16	3	"God Bless the Child"	Chris Long	Dave Flebotte	March 16, 2008
Brent decides it's time to make the fact that he's the boss known to Lucy. In the meantime, Lucy embarks on the mission of bringing down a music mogul's empire. Finally, Don uncovers the hidden secrets of a famous politician.
17	4	"Ties That (Don't) Bind"	John Fortenberry	Robert Nathan	March 23, 2008
Lucy rekindles a romance with a powerful studio executive. Willa and Farber join forces to expose a scandal surrounding a hit television series. Holt is swept into a public relations fiasco when an outspoken relative surfaces.
18	5	"What is This Thing Called"	David Arquette	Mimi Friedman & Jeanette Collins	March 30, 2008
Lucy and Holt make serious decisions about their love affair. Meanwhile, Don's friendship with a pop icon reaches new levels, and Willa and Farber explore the love lives of top celebrities and reveal some very juicy secrets about them.
19	6	"And the Winner Is"	Tricia Brock	Albert Kim	April 6, 2008
Brent goes out of his way to impress his new boss. Meanwhile, the staff learns that the real gossip is backstage while covering an awards show.
20	7	"In Lieu of Flowers"	Chris Long	Bart Baker	April 13, 2008
Life-and-death circumstances compel Lucy to examine her relationships; an overweight sitcom star takes desperate measures to avoid being on the DirtNow cover; and a former child star tests Willa and Farber's relationship.

== Season two premiere and ratings ==
Dirt was picked up for an additional 13 episodes. However, prior to the writers' strike, only 7 episodes had been written and the shooting for these episodes wrapped in December 2007. After the strike was resolved, FX opted not to produce the remaining 6 episodes for "economic reasons" that did not affect the show's chances at renewal.

Not only was the season shortened from 13 to 7 episodes, but it was also moved to a competitive timeslot, Sundays at 10 P.M. FX began heavy promotion for the show in December 2007, but only about 1.7 million people tuned into the premiere on March 2, 2008.

The season started off with consistent ratings in the first few weeks. But after reaching its peak at 1.6 million in the middle of the season, the ratings began to slip, ending with 0.2 million in the finale.

While the first season did not receive much positive critical praise, the second and final season was slightly more well-received, with the Associated Press declaring, "it's dog-eat-dog fun", TV Guide saying, "it's trashy, flashy, and ridiculously addictive", and Entertainment Weekly described Cox's performance as "deliciously deviant" and gave the show a B−, as opposed to season 1 which got a C−.

Dirt was not renewed for a third season.

== Home media ==
Title	Release date	Ep #	Additional information
The Complete First Season	December 11, 2007	13	Featurettes: Celebrity Couple Gets Dirty; Through A Lens, Darkly; Tabloid Wars. Deleted Scenes, Gag Reel, Season 2 Preview
Season Two	May 4, 2010	7	No Special Features

The series is licensed for DVD release to Buena Vista Home Entertainment.

Season 2 was released on DVD on May 4, 2010, through Lionsgate Home Entertainment.
