= Daisy Donovan =

British actress and television presenter (born 1973)

- Born: Daisy Constance Donovan; 23 July 1973 (age 53); London, England
- Education: London Academy of Music and Dramatic Art
- Occupations: Television presenter; actress; writer
- Years active: 1997–present
- Spouse: Dan Mazer (m. 2005)
- Children: 2

Daisy Constance Donovan (born 23 July 1973) is an English television presenter, actress and writer.

== Early life ==
Donovan was born in London. Her father was fashion photographer and film director Terence Donovan; her mother, Diana (née St. Felix Dare), was chairwoman of the English National Ballet School. She is sister to Rockstar Games co-founder Terry Donovan and half-sister to Big Audio Dynamite keyboard player Dan Donovan – and former sister-in-law of Patsy Kensit. Donovan went to the independent St Paul's Girls School in Hammersmith, London. She started reading Classics at the University of Cambridge before switching to study English at the University of Edinburgh, where she performed with the Drama Society. She then studied at the London Academy of Music and Dramatic Art.

== Career ==
Donovan became a receptionist, and then a runner on the first series of The Eleven O'Clock Show. The producers were looking for a female interviewer who would act straight but use comedic lines, and searched everywhere – until they tried their receptionist, the rather posh-talking Donovan. She made occasional appearance as "It Girl" Pandora Box-Grainger. In the second series she presented shorts, 'Angel of Delight', in which she interviewed politicians (she once asked Denis Healey whether he would ever give Margaret Thatcher a "pearl necklace") and got the co-host job with Iain Lee from late 1999–2000.

In 2000, Donovan was featured prominently in series one of sitcom My Family, playing Brigitte, Ben's annoying, superstitious dental assistant.

In 2002 she played Laura in Debbie Isitt's The Woman Who Cooked Her Husband while it ran at The Ambassadors Theatre in the West End.

Donovan subsequently hosted quiz shows: Does Doug Know? and the eponymous Daisy Daisy, which she also wrote and produced. In 2006, Donovan presented the British Fashion awards and later presented one series of a programme based in America called Daisy Does America.

Since 2006 she has concentrated on writing screenplays and acting in minor roles. Donovan appeared in Death at a Funeral (2007), Wild Child (2008) and I Give it a Year (2012).

== Personal life ==
In 2005 she married her longtime boyfriend, Dan Mazer, a comedy writer and producer, in Morocco. The couple have two daughters.

She lives in West London.

== Filmography ==
Title	Role	Year	Episode / Series	Notes
Spiceworld: The Movie	Reporter	1997		uncredited
Still Crazy	Female Reporter	1998		
Parting Shots		1998		
The Eleven O'Clock Show	Presenter	1998–2000		
The Unexpected Mrs. Pollifax	Alexanda / Marina	1999		
My Family	Brigitte	2000	Series 1	
Daisy, Daisy	Host	2001		
Does Doug Know?	Host	2002		
Second Nature	Kristina Kane / Amy O'Brien	2003		
Poirot	Cornelia Robson	2004	Death on the Nile	
Coming Up	Jen	2004	"Pillow Talk"	
Millions	Dorothy	2004		
Angel's Hell	Polly	2005		
Daisy Does America	Host	2005		
Death at a Funeral	Martha	2007		
Wild Child	Miss Rees-Withers	2008		
The Greatest Shows on Earth	Host	2013		
