= The Good Half =

2023 film by Robert Schwartzman

- Theatrical release poster
- Directed by: Robert Schwartzman
- Written by: Brett Ryland
- Produced by: Russell Wayne Groves; Robert Schwartzman; Brett Ryland
- Starring: Nick Jonas; Brittany Snow; David Arquette; Alexandra Shipp; Matt Walsh; Elisabeth Shue
- Cinematography: Michael Rizzi
- Edited by: Chris Donlon
- Music by: William Schwartzman; Ben Messelbeck
- Production company: The Ranch Productions
- Distributed by: Utopia
- Release dates: June 8, 2023 (Tribeca Festival); July 23, 2024 (United States)
- Running time: 96 minutes
- Country: United States
- Language: English
- Box office: $151,894

The Good Half is a 2023 American drama film directed by Robert Schwartzman and written by Brett Ryland. It stars Nick Jonas, Brittany Snow, David Arquette, Alexandra Shipp, Matt Walsh, and Elisabeth Shue. The film premiered at the Tribeca Festival on June 8, 2023, and was released in the United States on July 23, 2024.

== Premise ==
Renn Wheeland returns home to Cleveland, Ohio, for his mother's funeral. Once there, he forges new relationships while healing old ones, before confronting his problems and trying to face his grief.

== Cast ==
- Nick Jonas as Renn Wheeland
- Brittany Snow as Leigh Wheeland
- David Arquette as Rick Barona
- Alexandra Shipp as Zoey Abbot
- Matt Walsh as Darren Wheeland
- Elisabeth Shue as Lily Wheeland

== Release ==
The film premiered at the Tribeca Festival on June 8, 2023. It was released theatrically in the United States on July 23, 2024.

== Reception ==
On the review aggregator website Rotten Tomatoes, 48% of 25 critics' reviews are positive, with an average rating of 5.7/10.

Brittany Witherspoon of Screen Rant awarded the film three and a half stars out of five. Lovia Gyarkye of The Hollywood Reporter gave wrote, "It's disappointing when The Good Half undercuts its own momentum. Jagged transitions and an overuse of slow-motion, needle-drop moments contribute to the overall unevenness." Kyndall Cunnighman of The Daily Beast wrote, "From its formulaic plot to its mechanical dialogue and one-dimensional characters, The Good Half is as generic and uncurious as a movie about grief and masculinity can get."
