= Bentonville, Virginia =

- Unincorporated community
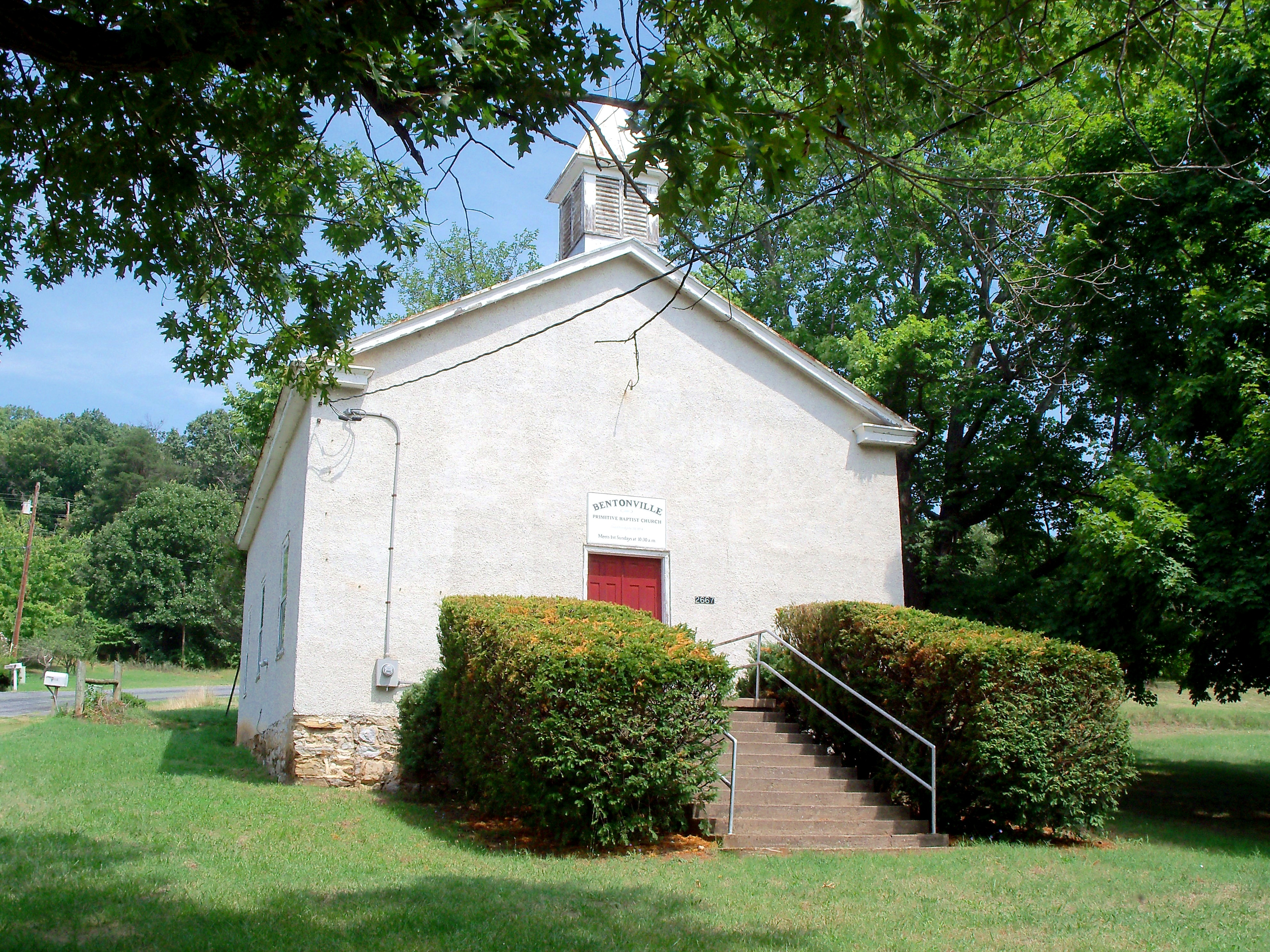
- Bentonville Primitive Baptist Church

- Location within Virginia Location within the United States
- Coordinates: 38°49′54″N 78°18′59″W
- Country: United States
- State: Virginia
- County: Warren
- Elevation: 748 ft (228 m)
- Time zone: UTC-5 (Eastern (EST))
  - Summer (DST): UTC-4 (EDT)
- ZIP code: 22610
- Area code: 540
- GNIS feature ID: 1492556

Bentonville is a small unincorporated village in Warren County, Virginia, United States. Bentonville is located along U.S. Route 340, 8.9 miles (14.3 km) southwest of Front Royal. As of 2025, the population of Bentonville is 1,625. Bentonville has a post office with ZIP code 22610.

It is the birthplace of Hollywood actor David Arquette.
