= List of Cougar Town characters =

Cougar Town is an American television sitcom that aired on ABC and later TBS. The characters were created by Bill Lawrence and Kevin Biegel. It focuses on a recently divorced woman who re-enters the dating world while living with her 17-year-old son and still being constantly pestered by her slacker ex-husband. A pilot episode of the show was broadcast after Modern Family on September 23, 2009.The series featured seven main cast members: a 40-year-old mother who's newly single Jules Cobb (Courteney Cox); Ellie Torres (Christa Miller) as Jules' next door neighbor and best friend; Laurie Keller (Busy Philipps), Jules' young assistant; Bobby Cobb (Brian Van Holt), Jules' unemployed ex-husband; Travis Cobb (Dan Byrd), Jules' 17-year-old son; Andy Torres (Ian Gomez), Ellie's husband; and Grayson Ellis (Josh Hopkins), Jules' newly divorced neighbor.

== Main characters ==
=== Julia "Jules" Kiki Cobb-Ellis ===
Courteney Cox plays Jules Cobb, born November 15, 1968, a recently divorced single mother exploring the honest truths about dating and aging. Jules resides in a small town in Florida and is a real estate agent who is successful in business. Though she has been out of the dating world for a while, Jules decides to find love again. She starts dating Josh, a 28-year-old in the beginning of season 1. However, she breaks up with him after he tells her he's in love with her, and she realizes she does not reciprocate those feelings. She meets her next boyfriend, Jeff while trying to sell a house to him and they date for a while until she realizes that they want different things: Jeff is looking for a long-term relationship, while Jules is not. After her break-up with Jeff, Jules sleeps with Bobby but rejects his offer to reunite romantically. Jules tells him that she does not love him like that anymore after their divorce. Jules also has an incredibly close relationship with her high school (and later college) aged son, Travis, whom she had with her ex-husband Bobby. The rest of the group finds her relationship with Travis somewhat scary and it has even been mentioned by Jules herself that professionals have deemed it 'unhealthy'. Jules and her neighbor, Grayson are attracted to each other, their friendship is innocent and flirty until the episode "Letting You Go" when they kiss and sleep together. In the next episode, Grayson and Jules explore the idea of friends with benefits, but they both realize that they want more and start secretly dating. In the Season 1 finale, they reveal the fact that they are dating to everyone, including Bobby—who is upset initially but learns to accept their relationship. Jules and Grayson get engaged at the beginning of Season 3 and are later married on the beach at the end of the season. Jules also has a close relationship with her widower father, Chick.

Relationships

Ellie Torres

Ellie Torres is Jules' neighbor and best friend. They have coffee together every morning and drink wine throughout the day. Jules values Ellie's opinions above everyone else's.

Laurie Keller

Laurie Keller is Jules' colleague and close friend. Laurie is relatively younger than Jules and usually is the “go to” friend whenever Ellie disapproves. Laurie competes with Ellie for Jules’ attention. While Jules thinks of Laurie as a friend Laurie thinks a Jules as a mother figure. Laurie also takes part in excessive drinking like all of the gang.

Grayson Ellis

Grayson Ellis is Jules' neighbor, love interest and subsequent husband. Like Jules Grayson got divorced and starts dating younger partners. He becomes friends with Jules and after a series of flirting between the two he eventually falls for her. He is usually the one to calm Jules when she overreacts.

Travis Cobb

Travis Cobb is Jules’ son with Bobby Cobb, next to Ellie Jules considers Travis to be her next best friend. Jules is very protective of Travis and interferes in every aspect of his life which sometimes seems very inappropriate.

Bobby Cobb

Bobby Cobb is Jules ex-husband. She supported him after the divorce for a number of years until he resisted. Despite being divorced she still considers Bobby to be one of her best friends. He calls her J-bird.

=== Elisabeth "Ellie" Torres ===
Christa Miller plays Ellie Torres, Jules' next door neighbor and best friend. Ellie is married to Andy Torres, and the two have a son, Stan. She is the sarcastic, unapologetic confidante who is often jealous of Jules' young assistant and friend, Laurie. The two have an outwardly spiteful relationship, in which they constantly exchange verbal jabs and insults; however, several episodes reveal that she has a soft spot for Laurie, whom she refers to as "jellybean." Ellie and Jules have been friends for many years and know all of each other's embarrassing secrets and stories. Ellie quit her job as a lawyer to stay home with Stan, though enjoys a copious amount of freedom since Andy hired a nanny for her as a surprise. Ellie's marriage to Andy is a happy one: she enjoys being the queen of the household, bossing Andy and the nanny around, and spending Andy's money. Andy, in turn, absolutely adores Ellie, and she often uses this to her advantage. She has also shown attraction towards other men, including Bobby and Grayson. However, she has admitted that she loves Andy "so much" that if something happened to him, she would not know what to do. Ellie loves to gossip and make judgmental comments about others, which makes her seem mean; however, she is also fiercely loyal to her friends. The smartest and most grounded of the characters, she frequently finds she has to be the "adult" of the group, much to her annoyance. Her birthday is on Valentine's Day.

=== Laurie Keller ===
Busy Philipps plays Laurie Keller, Jules' younger employee. Laurie works with Jules in the same real estate office as her assistant. Laurie often encourages Jules to get out and have fun and tries to reacquaint her to the world of dating. She considers herself Jules' best friend, although Jules' actual best friend is Ellie. Laurie spent much of her youth in and out of foster homes, and early in the series she is struggling to live life as a functional adult. She sees Jules as a mentor in some ways, frequently asking her for help and advice. Laurie is known for her fun-loving, unashamedly wild personality, frequently engaging in and bragging about her one-night stands and hookups. Late in season 1, Laurie dates a rich young law student named Smith Frank. When Smith leaves to return to school, Grayson tries to cheer her up and the two end up having sex. The next morning, they both agree to keep it a secret from the rest of the group. After Jules and Grayson start dating, the secret emerges and deeply upsets Jules; however, she eventually forgives Grayson because they were not in a relationship at the time and Laurie because the bad breakup with Smith moves her to pity. Laurie's flirty relationship with Jules' son Travis, who is several years her junior, is another concept often revisited by the group. Travis has stronger feelings for Laurie than she does for him, which she finds entertaining and flattering. In the season 2 finale, Laurie manipulates Travis' feelings for her to convince him to return to Florida after he runs away to Hawaii. During season 3, Travis tries to pull away from Laurie, stating that it is difficult for him to be around her when he has such strong feelings for her, knowing she probably will never feel the same way. However, after an embarrassing scene in the season 3 finale, Laurie begins to see Travis in a more romantic way. She eventually realizes she has feelings towards Travis near the end of the fourth season, and she reveals this to him. The two share their first kiss in the season finale. As of season 5, they are officially a couple. In the season 5 finale, Laurie gives Jules some of her urine to use for a physical, as Jules had happy pills in her system at the time, and it was revealed that she is pregnant with Travis's child.

=== Robert "Bobby" Cobb ===
Brian Van Holt plays Bobby Cobb, Jules' ex-husband. Bobby is a classic under-achiever who'll test Jules' patience as they attempt to raise their son, Travis. He spent most of their marriage touring as a semi-pro golfer and cheated on her several times, leading to their divorce. After the divorce, he spent his time as a golf instructor and grass-cutter at Travis' high school, while hanging out with his best friend, Andy. During this time, he lived on a grounded houseboat and drove a well-worn golf cart for transportation. He also invented the game 'Penny Can' which becomes very popular, first among the group but later among a wide variety of people after Roger Frank (the father of Laurie's ex-boyfriend) purchases it for his company. Throughout the series, he has been shown to not have as many relationships as he'd like. Some of his flings included Jules' dermatologist, Travis's photography teacher, and a woman named Sam, all of which ended in disaster. He is dating a tom-boyish redhead named Lisa Riggs. He also owns a Brindle Mastif named Dog Travis or 'DT' for short. During the last season, Bobby is rarely seen, as he was encouraged by Andy to take a well-paying golf pro job in Georgia. He is of Irish, Dutch, and Scottish descent.

=== Travis Cobb ===
Dan Byrd plays Travis Cobb, is Jules' high-school (and later, college) aged son. He loves both of his parents although is constantly embarrassed by both of them. At school, he constantly deals with humiliation from his friends and classmates. He is generally supportive of his mother, but feels that her dating exploits cause him embarrassment. After dealing with his mom's real estate ads around town and his dad's new job as his school's lawn mower, his father helps him realize not to worry about what other people think. Travis dates Kylie, his high school girlfriend, during season 1 and loses his virginity to her. In season 2, Travis leaves for college and has an open long-distance relationship with Kylie, but he later realizes that he is dissatisfied by this because of her many other male companions. He tries to break up with her and fails when she rejects his breakup, saying "I like telling people that I have a college boyfriend." Later in season 2, Travis begins dating an older girl, a grad student named Kirsten whom Jules is initially threatened by. Later, the relationship becomes more serious, but Kirsten receives a job offer in Chicago. Travis proposes to Kirsten so that she will stay and continue dating him, but her rejection of his proposal leads to their separation. Travis then sinks into a deep depression, in which he drops out of college and moves onto Bobby's boat. He then runs away to Hawaii, until the whole gang brings him back. In season 3, Travis re-enrolls in college, where he spends times with his friends, Kevin and Sig. Throughout the whole series, Travis and Laurie are shown to have this flirty relationship. He seems to have a crush on her whenever he's not with someone. However, after being embarrassingly rejected time after time he begins sleeping with random girls, and has a 'skank parade'. Laurie at this point is with Wade, her online soldier boyfriend who has just returned from Afghanistan, and she is outraged at Travis' behavior. Seeing this, Wade breaks up with her, and she soon begins to reveal that she does have feelings for Travis. She tells him, and after he once again confesses his feelings, they go on their first date.

=== Andy Torres ===
Ian Gomez plays Andy Torres, Ellie's Cuban-American husband who is also Jules's next door neighbor. Andy is a devoted husband to Ellie and also a loving father to their son, Stan. Although he is of Latino descent, he never bothered to learn Spanish, unlike Jules, Ellie and Laurie, who speak it fluently. He loves coffee and displays deep loyalty and hero worship for Jules' ex-husband, Bobby, his best friend before and after the divorce. Andy is a business mogul and corporate hotshot at his job, but a childlike sweetheart with family and friends. His common catchphrase is "Come onnnnnnnn!" which is often his response when Ellie forbids him from doing something he wants to do, or when the others play jokes on him. During season 3, Andy expresses an interest in running for mayor and campaigns against Roger Frank, the father of Laurie's ex-boyfriend, Smith. In Season 4, he learns several weeks late that he won the election and actually is the mayor of the town. Because the position has little or no authority, no one bothered to tell him about it.

=== Grayson Ellis ===
Josh Hopkins plays Grayson Ellis, Jules' neighbor. He owns and operates Gray's Pub, a frequent hangout for the gang. Grayson, like Jules, is also newly divorced, but unlike Jules, he embraces his bachelorhood and single lifestyle. Grayson enjoys dating and sleeping with younger women, often rubbing it in Jules' face. Yet he is still tethered by the fact that his ex-wife, Vivian, left him because he wanted kids and she claimed that she did not; however, it is later revealed that she got engaged to another man and is pregnant—a crushing blow for Grayson. He is shown to be very vain, often looking at himself in the mirror and reminiscing about his time as a male model. Ellie refers to him as 'Dime Eyes', mentioning constantly that he has small, beady eyes. Despite this, Ellie and Grayson have a good friendship. Ellie has also been shown to be attracted to him. After a flirty friendship with Jules, Grayson's feelings for her emerge while he is dating Sara (played by Sheryl Crow). He unintentionally revealed his interest in Jules to Bobby and Andy at Thanksgiving. Both of his parents died the year before the show started, with his father dying on Valentine's day. After dating and falling in love with Jules, Grayson proposes to her in the season 3 premiere. After a somewhat frustrating period of engagement, during which it is revealed that he got one of his hookups pregnant resulting in a baby girl named Tampa, the two play with the idea of eloping, but end up marrying on the beach in a small ceremony with only friends and family present at the end of season 3. Grayson plays guitar and has frequently made up songs about the group and their situations.

== Recurring characters ==
- Bob Clendenin plays Tom Gazelian – Jules' widowed neighbor who expresses his attraction for her in weird ways, makes wine by stomping grapes in his garage, and is always doing things for Jules' and the gang to try and fit in. He is frequently seen peering through Jules' kitchen window, unnoticed by the gang until he says something. Trying to become part of the group, he follows the gang to Hawaii but is not noticed until the end of their trip. He eventually gains acceptance into the group in the third season. He is also a neurosurgeon.
- Carolyn Hennesy plays Barbara "Barb" Coman, an older cougar. Barbara works in the same real estate office as Jules who is also another cougar, although Barb is older than Jules. In the third episode, Barb reveals that she is 48 years old. At the end of season 3 she is also revealed to have married Smith Frank's dad (Roger Frank), the ex-mayor of the town they all live in.
- Ken Jenkins plays Chick, Jules' widower father. He is a keen lover of horses and his favourite holiday is Halloween. Chick becomes ordained as a minister online so that he can perform the wedding ceremony for Jules and Grayson at the end of season three. In season four he is diagnosed with Alzheimers' disease, after revealing to Jules that his memory has been worsening for some time.
- Spencer Locke plays Kylie, Travis' girlfriend. Travis loses his virginity to Kylie, but the two later break up after they both cheat on each other. The couple later reconcile. When Travis goes off to college she decides to play the field but Travis wants a more committed relationship so they break up.
- Ryan Devlin plays Smith Frank, a young law student who becomes Laurie's boyfriend. In Season 2, Smith breaks up with Laurie after she admits to Jules that she is in love with him, but he realizes he doesn't feel the same way and does not see a future with her.
- Barry Bostwick plays Roger Frank, a wealthy businessman and Smith's father. He strongly disapproves of Laurie, receives golfing lessons from Bobby, and eventually buys "Penny Can" from both of them. He is the former mayor of Gulfhaven, being succeeded by Andy Torres.
- Nick Zano plays Josh, Jules' younger boyfriend. Josh is the first guy that Jules begins dating for a string of episodes. The producers decided to keep his character around because they didn't want Cox's character to be the kind who would leave him after one episode.
- LaMarcus Tinker plays Kevin – Travis's college roommate and friend. Travis annoys Kevin when they first meet, as he's trying to find his way in college. However, Travis earns Kevin's respect and they become good friends.
- Collette Wolfe plays Kirsten (Season 2) – Travis' second, older girlfriend, whom he meets in his first semester of college. Travis later proposes to her, but she rejects him and moves to Chicago.
- Christopher Randazzo & Zachary Randazzo play Stan, Andy and Ellie's baby son. In later seasons, the older Stan is played by Sawyer Ever.
- Sarah Chalke plays Angie LeClaire (Season 3) - Travis' Photography teacher at his University in Florida. She becomes a love interest for Bobby after Travis shows her photos of him for one of his assignments. Jules sets up a planned date for Bobby and Angie involving Grayson, Laurie, Travis, Tom and Andy. Angie and Bobby's relationship eventually ends when they realize that while Bobby wanted to be exclusive, Angie only expected a fling.
- Maria Thayer plays Lisa Riggs, Bobby's tomboyish surfing buddy whom he initially treats as "one of the guys" but later develops romantic feelings for. She and Bobby began dating at the end of season four.
