= Coquette Productions =

American film and television production company

- Type: Private
- Industry: Production company
- Founded: June 2004; 22 years ago in Los Angeles, California, U.S.
- Founders: Courteney Cox; David Arquette
- Headquarters: Los Angeles, California, U.S.

Coquette Productions was an American film and television production company founded by Courteney Cox and David Arquette in June 2004. The company was located in Los Angeles, California.

The company name is a portmanteau of Cox's and Arquette's surnames. The logo contains a family of ducks.

== Filmography ==
=== Television ===
- Mix It Up (2003)
- Talk Show Diaries (2005)
- Daisy Does America (with Warner Bros. Television) (2005)
- Dirt (with FX Productions, Matthew Carnahan Circus Products, Touchstone Television and ABC Studios) (2007–2008)
- Cougar Town (with Doozer and ABC Studios) (2009–2015)
- TripAholics (2013)
- Celebrity Name Game (with Entertain the Brutes, Green Mountain West Inc., CBS Television Studios and Fremantle North America) (2014–2017)

=== Film ===
- Bigger Than the Sky (with Neverland Films) (2005)
- Slingshot (2005)
- The Tripper (with Raw Entertainment) (2007)
- The Butler's in Love (with Le Tourment Vert and Bischoff Hervey Entertainment) (2008)
- The Big Change (2009)
- Just Before I Go (with New Artists Alliance) (2014)
