= Courteney Cox =

American actress and producer (born 1964)

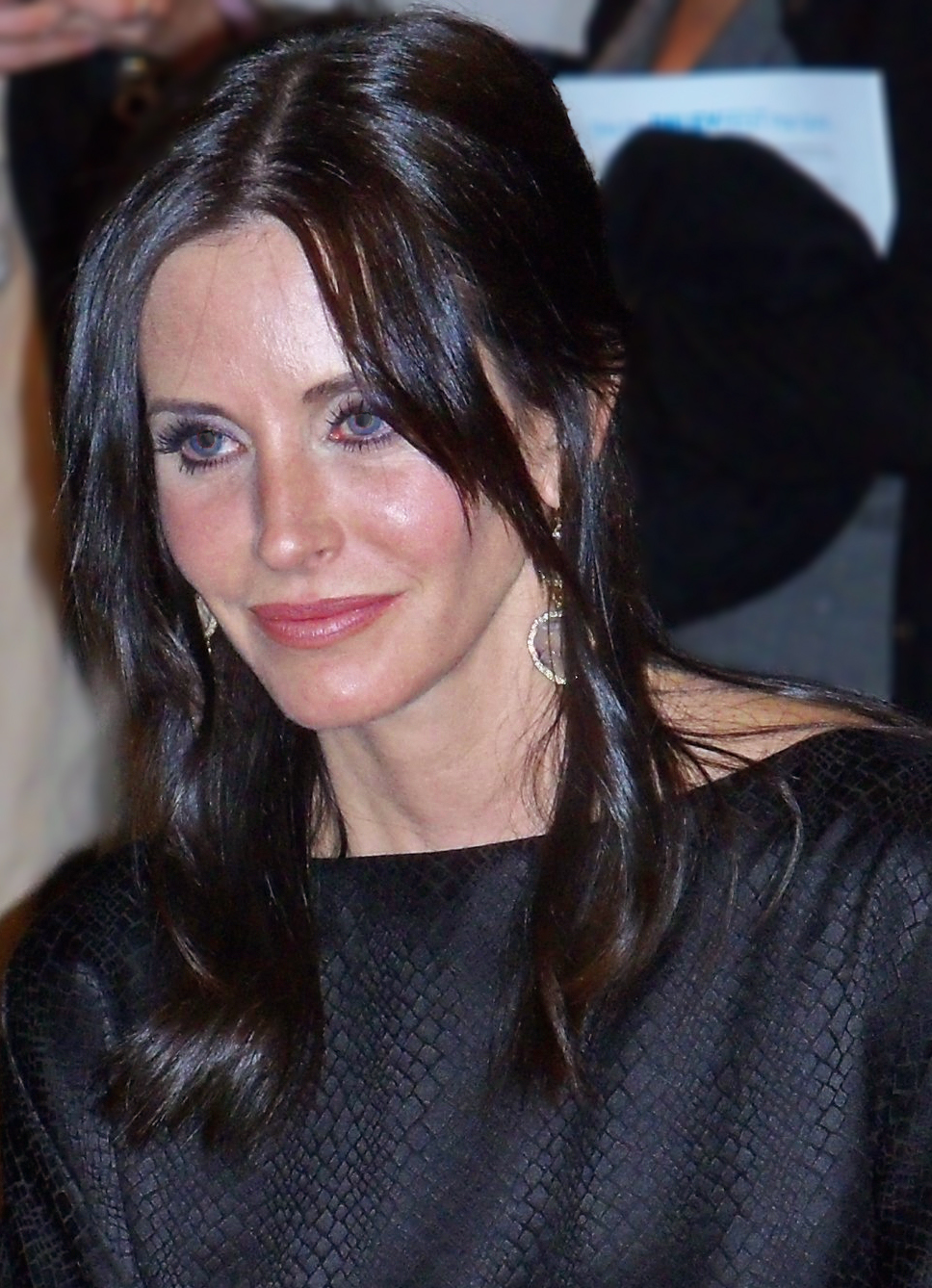
- Cox in 2010
- Born: Courteney Bass Cox; June 15, 1964 (age 62); Birmingham, Alabama, U.S.
- Other name: Courteney Cox Arquette
- Occupations: Actress; producer; director
- Years active: 1975–present
- Organization: Coquette Productions
- Spouse: David Arquette (m. 1999; div. 2014)
- Partners: Michael Keaton (1989–1995); Johnny McDaid (2013–2026)
- Children: 1
- Awards: Full list

Courteney Bass Cox (born June 15, 1964) is an American actress and producer. She rose to international prominence by playing Monica Geller in the NBC sitcom Friends (1994–2004) and Gale Weathers in the horror film franchise Scream (1996–present). Her accolades include an Actor Award, nominations for two Emmy Awards and a Golden Globe Award, and a star on the Hollywood Walk of Fame.

Cox had a recurring role in the NBC sitcom Family Ties (1987–1989), and starred in the FX drama series Dirt (2007–2008), the ABC/TBS sitcom Cougar Town (2009–2015), and the Starz horror comedy series Shining Vale (2022–2023). Her film credits include the action fantasy Masters of the Universe (1987), the comedy Ace Ventura: Pet Detective (1994), the animated comedy Barnyard (2006), the fantasy comedy Bedtime Stories (2008), and the independent drama Mothers and Daughters (2016).

Cox owned the production company Coquette Productions, which she founded with her then-husband, David Arquette. She has directed the television drama film TalhotBlond (2012), the black comedy drama film Just Before I Go (2014), and executive produced the game show Celebrity Name Game (2014–2017).

== Early life ==
Courteney Bass Cox was born June 15, 1964, in Birmingham, Alabama, where she was also raised. She is the daughter of businessman Richard Lewis Cox (1931–2001) and Courteney Copeland (née Bass; 1934–2020). Cox has two older sisters, Virginia and Dorothy, and an older brother, Richard Jr. Her parents divorced in 1974, after which her mother married businessman Hunter Copeland, uncle to music promoter and business manager Ian Copeland and the Police drummer Stewart Copeland.

After graduating from Mountain Brook High School, Cox enrolled at Mount Vernon College in Washington, D.C. (later part of George Washington University), to study architecture, but left before completing the program to pursue modeling and acting. Cox’s father is of British (English, Scottish and Welsh) descent, while her mother had Norman and Irish ancestry. While researching her family history for the series Who Do You Think You Are?, Cox discovered she is a direct descendant of William the Conqueror and Edward I of England.

== Career ==
=== Early work ===
Cox was a teen exotic dancer but soon was chosen from a casting call by director Brian De Palma to appear in the 1984 music video for Bruce Springsteen's "Dancing in the Dark", as the young woman pulled onstage at the St. Paul Civic Center to dance with Springsteen. Her early television work includes a starring role as Gloria Dinallo in the short-lived NBC science fiction series Misfits of Science (1985), and guest-starring roles in the ABC comedy-drama series The Love Boat (1986) and the CBS crime drama series Murder, She Wrote (1986). She also appeared in a 1985 Tampax ad notable for making her the first person to use the word "period" in an American television commercial. She later had a recurring role as Lauren Miller, the girlfriend of Michael J. Fox's character Alex P. Keaton in the NBC comedy series Family Ties (1987–1989). Cox's early film roles include Masters of the Universe (1987), Cocoon: The Return (1988), and I'll Be Home for Christmas (1988). She also played Jewel Jagger, the tough-as-nails assistant of Larry Burrows (James Belushi), in Mr. Destiny (1990).

=== 1990s: International breakthrough ===
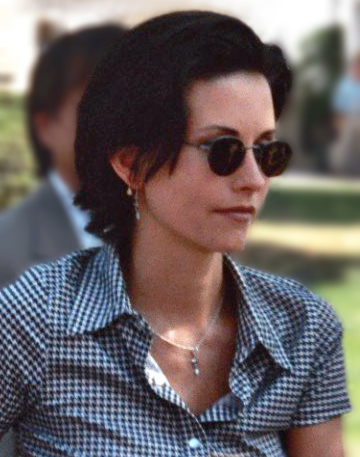
Cox in 1995

In 1993, Cox co-starred in the short-lived CBS sitcom The Trouble with Larry, alongside Bronson Pinchot and Perry King. The following year, shortly before the debut of the sitcom Friends, Cox starred alongside Jim Carrey in the comedy film Ace Ventura: Pet Detective, and as Jerry Seinfeld's girlfriend, Meryl, in the Seinfeld episode "The Wife".

In 1994, Cox was asked to audition for the starring role of Rachel Green on a new sitcom, Friends; she was cast as Monica Geller instead. At first the most famous cast member of the new show, Cox joined Jennifer Aniston (Rachel Green), Lisa Kudrow (Phoebe Buffay), Matt LeBlanc (Joey Tribbiani), Matthew Perry (Chandler Bing) and David Schwimmer (Ross Geller) for what became her most famous role, lasting for ten seasons until 2004. The series is commonly referred to as one of the greatest of all sitcoms. According to the Guinness Book of World Records (2005), Cox (along with her female co-stars) became the highest-paid TV actress of all time, with her US$1 million-per-episode fee for the final two seasons of Friends. Syndication of the series earned Cox and her co-stars an estimated $20 million in annual residuals. In 1995, she was cast in Toad the Wet Sprocket's music video "Good Intentions". The song was also featured on the Friends soundtrack.

Between seasons five and six, she married David Arquette and consequently changed her name to Courteney Cox Arquette. A joke reference to this is made in the opening credits of the episode "The One After Vegas", where the rest of the cast has "Arquette" added to their names. The dedication "For Courteney and David, who did get married" – a reference to Monica and Chandler's decision not to marry in the episode – appears during the fade out to the tag scene.

Cox received further recognition and critical acclaim for her starring role as reporter Gale Weathers in the high-profile slasher horror film Scream (1996), and its sequels Scream 2 (1997) and Scream 3 (2000). The series is one of the highest grossing and critically acclaimed horror franchises of all time. Cox's character was well known for her "snappy remarks and being brilliantly bossy". She met her future ex-husband, David Arquette, who played her on-screen love interest, Dwight "Dewey" Riley, while filming the first Scream film. He also was in an episode of the TV Show Friends Cox also hosted an episode of the variety sketch series Saturday Night Live in April 1995, and appeared in the crime thriller film The Runner (1999).

=== 2000s: Continued success ===
Cox's major films during this period include the crime drama 3000 Miles to Graceland (2001) and the comedy The Shrink Is In (2001). In late 2003, Cox and Arquette produced one season of the reality television series Mix It Up. The lifestyle series, which aired on the WE cable channel, struggled with low ratings and was not renewed for a second season. After the conclusion of Friends, Cox was producer Marc Cherry's first choice to be offered a starring role as Susan Mayer on Desperate Housewives, but Cox was unavailable due to her pregnancy and the role later went to Teri Hatcher. A few years later, Cox signed a deal with ABC Studios (formerly Touchstone Television) to star in her own series.

She starred in the independent drama film November (2005), which had a limited theatrical release. She had a cameo appearance in the big-budget remake The Longest Yard (2005) as Lena, the girlfriend of Paul Crewe (Adam Sandler), and co-starred with Tim Allen in the critically derided Zoom (2006). Cox voiced Daisy the Cow in the animated film Barnyard (2006). A Friends reunion film was rumored to be in production following the success of Sex and the City (2008), but this was later denied by Warner Bros. and others. Cox starred as Lucy Spiller, a cynical tabloid editor, in the FX television drama series Dirt, which premiered in 2007. Cox and her then-husband David Arquette were the executive producers of the series. The series was eventually canceled after the second season in 2008. In July 2008, Entertainment Weekly announced that Cox signed on to star in a three-episode arc for the television medical comedy series Scrubs. Also that year, she starred in the fantasy comedy film Bedtime Stories, reuniting with co-star Adam Sandler. She went to executive produce the short drama film The Butler's in Love, directed by David Arquette.

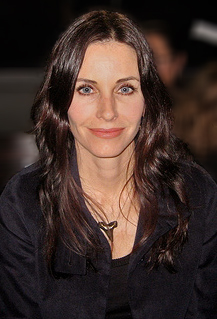
Cox in 2009

Cox guest-starred in a three-episode story arc on former Friends co-star Lisa Kudrow's web comedy series Web Therapy (2009). Also in 2009, she began her role as the star of the single-camera ABC comedy series Cougar Town, playing a newly single 40-year-old mother on the hunt for new experiences. It is notably Cox's most successful work since Friends, earning her a nomination for the Golden Globe Award for Best Actress – Television Series Musical or Comedy. The series' third season was set to premiere in November 2011 but moved to February 14, 2012. Cox directed two episodes of the series' fifteen episodes that season. The fourth season premiered on January 8, 2013. The series came to an end on March 31, 2015, after six seasons.

=== 2010s: Directorial debut and expansion ===
Cox reprised her role as Gale Weathers from the Scream trilogy for the sequel Scream 4. The film was released in theaters on April 15, 2011. She made her directorial debut and had a cameo appearance in a Lifetime television drama film TalhotBlond, which premiered on the network on June 23, 2012.

In 2014, Cox directed and produced the black comedy film Just Before I Go, starring Seann William Scott and Elisha Cuthbert. The film premiered at the Tribeca Film Festival on April 24, 2014, and it was released in select theaters on April 24, 2015. From 2014 to 2017, she executive produced the syndicated game show Celebrity Name Game, hosted by Craig Ferguson. It ended after three seasons. The series earned her a nomination for the Daytime Emmy Award for Outstanding Game Show.

In 2016, Cox starred in the independent drama film Mothers and Daughters, alongside Susan Sarandon, Mira Sorvino, and Sharon Stone. The film was released to generally negative reviews on May 6, 2016. In 2019, she created and executive produced the Facebook Watch documentary series 9 Months with Courteney Cox, which focuses on "people from across the country of various race, religion, and class as they self-document their 9-month journey of pregnancy". It lasted for three seasons until 2021. In 2019, it was reported she would executive produce and star as Brittany Wagner in the Spectrum Originals adaptation of the documentary series Last Chance U.

=== 2020s: Current work ===
In 2020, she guest starred in the ABC sitcom Modern Family. Cox reunited with her Friends co-stars for a reunion special titled Friends: The Reunion, which was released on May 27, 2021, on HBO Max. The special earned Cox a nomination for the Primetime Emmy Award for Outstanding Variety Special (Pre-Recorded). In the same year she launched her line of home products, named Homecourt. She also participated in the Celebrity Escape Room special to raise $150,000 for Red Nose Day.

Cox reprised her role as Gale Weathers for the fifth Scream film, which was directed by Matt Bettinelli-Olpin and Tyler Gillett. The film was released on January 14, 2022, to box office success and positive reviews. Also in 2022, she signed on to star alongside Greg Kinnear in the Starz horror comedy series Shining Vale, from creators Sharon Horgan and Jeff Astrof; she plays Patricia "Pat" Phelps, who moves her family "from the 'crazy' of the city to a large, old house in the suburbs where evil and humor collide."

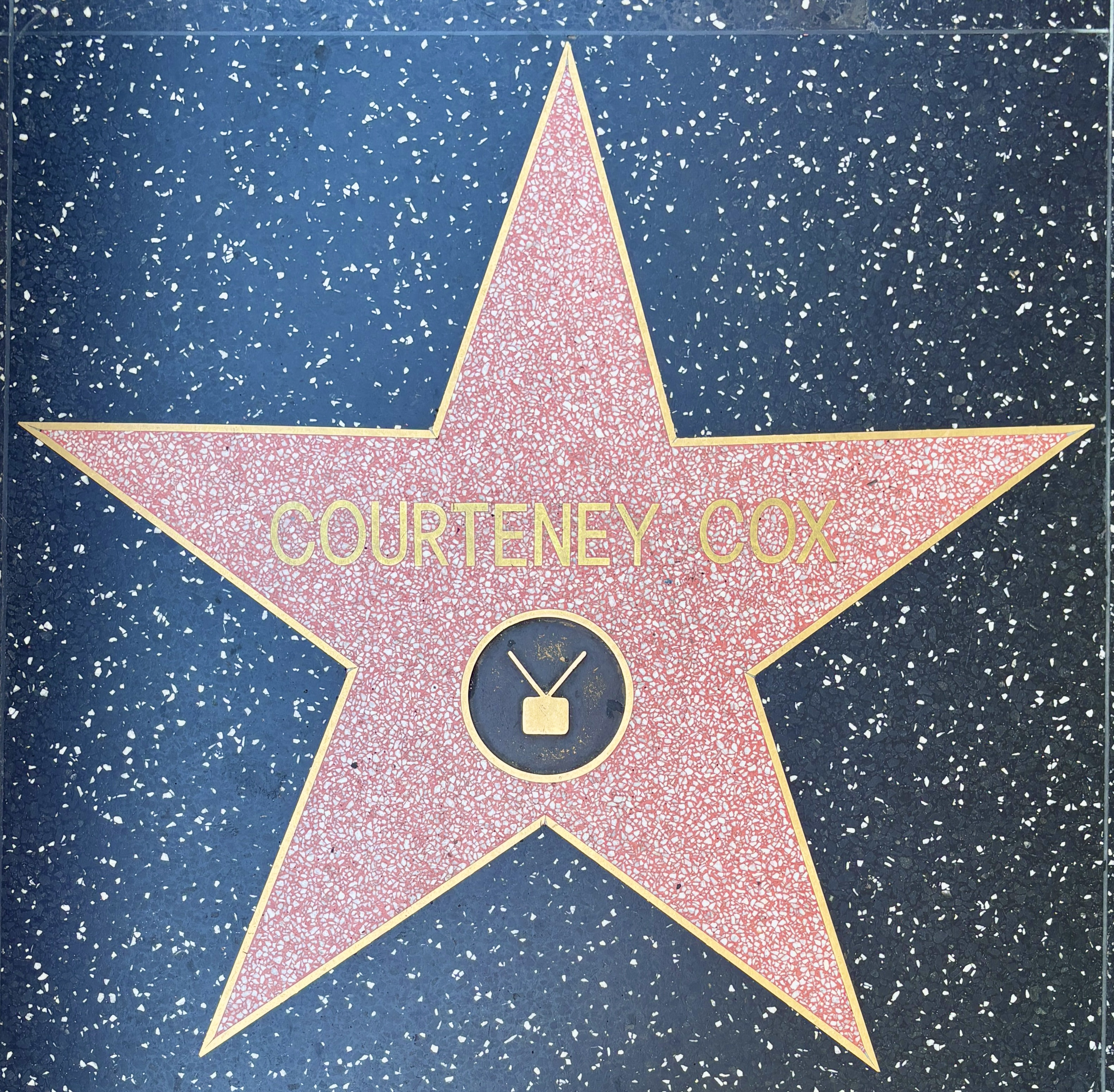
Star on the Hollywood Walk of Fame

Cox again reprised her role as Gale Weathers for the sixth Scream film, which she also executive produced. The film was released on March 9, 2023, to box office success and positive reviews. Also in 2023, she received a star on the Hollywood Walk of Fame. In 2026, Cox again reprised her role as Gale Weathers for the seventh Scream film.

== Personal life ==
Cox dated actor Michael Keaton from 1989 to 1995. She married her Scream co-star David Arquette on June 12, 1999, at Grace Cathedral in San Francisco. The couple have a daughter, born in June 2004. Jennifer Aniston is her godmother. Cox later revealed that she suffered from postpartum depression six months after her daughter's birth. On October 11, 2010, Cox and Arquette announced that they had separated, although they continue to maintain a close friendship and an ongoing business partnership through Coquette Productions. In June 2012, Arquette filed for divorce after nearly two years of separation, and the divorce was finalized in May 2014.

Cox began dating Snow Patrol band member Johnny McDaid in late 2013. The couple announced their engagement in June 2014, later calling it off but remaining together. Cox and McDaid's separation was announced in June 2026.

In 2020, Cox said that she did not remember many of the episode plots of Friends and had begun binge-watching the series.

She is a practitioner of Budokan karate.

== Filmography ==
=== Film ===
Year	Title	Role	Notes
1987	Down Twisted	Tarah	
1987	Masters of the Universe	Julie Winston	
1988	Cocoon: The Return	Sara	
1990	Shaking the Tree	Kathleen	
1990	Mr. Destiny	Jewel Jagger	
1991	Blue Desert	Lisa Roberts	
1992	The Opposite Sex and How to Live with Them	Carrie Davenport	
1994	Ace Ventura: Pet Detective	Melissa Robinson	
1996	Scream	Gale Weathers	
1997	Commandments	Rachel Luce	
1997	Scream 2	Gale Weathers	
1999	The Runner	Karina	
2000	Scream 3	Gale Weathers	Credited as "Courteney Cox Arquette"
2001	3000 Miles to Graceland	Cybil Waingrow	
2001	The Shrink Is In	Samantha Crumb	Also executive producer
2001	Get Well Soon	Lily Charles	
2004	November	Sophie Jacobs	
2005	The Longest Yard	Lena	Uncredited
2006	Barnyard	Daisy the Cow (voice)	
2006	Zoom	Marsha Holloway	
2006	The Tripper	Dog Lover Hippie	Also executive producer
2008	Alien Love Triangle	Alice	Short film
2008	Bedtime Stories	Wendy Bronson	
2008	The Butler's in Love	—N/a	Short film; executive producer
2011	Scream 4	Gale Weathers-Riley	
2012	Got Rights?	Celebrity	Short film
2014	Just Before I Go	—N/a	Director and producer
2016	Mothers and Daughters	Beth	
2020	You Cannot Kill David Arquette	Herself	Documentary film
2022	Scream	Gale Weathers	
2023	Scream VI	Gale Weathers	Also executive producer
2026	Scream 7	Gale Weathers	Also executive producer
2026	Evil Genius	—N/a	Director and producer

=== Television ===
Year	Title	Role	Notes
1975	As the World Turns	Bunny	Episode: "1.5000"
1985	Code Name: Foxfire	Amy	Episode: "Pick a Hero, Any Hero"
1985–1986	Misfits of Science	Gloria Dinallo	Main role
1986	The Love Boat	Carol	Episodes: "Daredevil", "Picture Me a Spy", "Sleeper"
1986	Sylvan in Paradise	Lucy Apple	Television film
1986	Murder, She Wrote	Carol Bannister	Episode: "Death Stalks the Big Top"
1987	If It's Tuesday, It Still Must Be Belgium	Hana Wyskocki	Television film
1987	I'll Be Home for Christmas	Nora Bundy	Television film
1987–1989	Family Ties	Lauren Miller	Recurring role
1989	Roxanne: The Prize Pulitzer	Jacquie Kimberly	Television film
1989	Judith Krantz's Till We Meet Again	Marie-Frederique 'Freddy' de Lancel	Miniseries
1990	Curiosity Kills	Gwen	Television film
1991	Morton & Hayes	Princess Lucy	Episode: "Oafs Overboard"
1992	Battling for Baby	Katherine	Television film
1992	Dream On	Alisha	Episode: "Come and Knock on Our Door..."
1993	The Trouble with Larry	Gabriella Easden	Recurring role
1994	Seinfeld	Meryl	Episode: "The Wife"
1994–2004	Friends (Note: Cox was credited as Courteney Cox Arquette from season six onwards due to her marriage with David Arquette during that time.)	Monica Geller	Main role
1995	Sketch Artist II: Hands That See	Emmy O'Conner	Television film
1995	The Larry Sanders Show	Herself	Episode: "S4.E13 Larry's Big Idea"
1995	Saturday Night Live	Herself/Host	Episode: "Courteney Cox / Dave Matthews Band"
1999	Happily Every After: Fairy Tales for Every Child	Emerald Salt Pork (voice)	Episode: "Three Little Pigs"
2000	WCW Monday Nitro	Herself	Episode: "#5.33"
2003	Mad TV	Herself	Episode: "#9.3"
2004	Mix It Up	—N/a	4 episodes; executive producer
2005	Rehab	Taylor Kennedy	Unsold pilot; also executive producer
2005	Dirt Squirrel	—N/a	Television film; executive producer
2005	Talk Show Diaries	—N/a	Television film; executive producer
2005	The MidNightly News	—N/a	Television film; executive producer
2005–2007	Daisy Does America	—N/a	Executive producer
2007–2008	Dirt	Lucy Spiller	Main role; also executive producer
2009	Scrubs	Dr. Maddox	Episodes: "My Jerks", "My Last Words", "My Saving Grace"
2009	Web Therapy	Serena DuVall	Episode: "Psychic Friends" (web series)
2009–2015	Cougar Town	Jules Cobb	Main role; also director and executive producer
2011	Web Therapy	Serena DuVall	Episode: "Psychic Analysis"
2011	Private Practice	Woman	Episode: "Step One" (uncredited)
2012	TalhotBlond	Amanda	Television film; also director and producer
2013	Go On	Talia	Episode: "Matchup Problems"
2013	Tripaholics	—N/a	Television film; executive producer
2014–2016	Drunk History	Edith Wilson	Episodes: "First Ladies", "Election Special"
2014–2017	Celebrity Name Game	Herself	Also executive producer
2015	Barely Famous	Herself	Episode: "Favorite Socks"
2016	Charity Case	Hailey	Unsold pilot; also executive producer
2016	Running Wild with Bear Grylls	Herself	Episode: "Courteney Cox"
2017	Who Do You Think You Are?	Herself	Episode: "Courteney Cox"
2017	Off Camera with Sam Jones	Herself	Episode: "Courteney Cox"
2017	The Gong Show	Herself	Episode: "Will Arnett / Courteney Cox / Isla Fisher"
2018	Shameless	Jen Wagner	Episode: "Face It, You're Gorgeous"
2019–2021	9 Months with Courteney Cox	Herself / Host	Also creator and executive producer
2020	Modern Family	Herself	Episode: "The Prescott"
2020	Celebrity Escape Room	Herself	Red Nose Day special
2021	Friends: The Reunion	Herself	Television special; also executive producer
2022–2023	Shining Vale	Patricia "Pat" Phelps	Main role; also producer

=== Music videos ===
Year	Title	Artist	Role	Notes
1984	"Dancing in the Dark"	Bruce Springsteen	Young Woman	
1994	"Ace Is in the House"	Tone Loc	Melissa Robinson	
1995	"I'll Be There for You"	The Rembrandts	Monica Geller	
1995	"Good Intentions"	Toad the Wet Sprocket	Woman	
1996	"A Long December"	Counting Crows	Woman	
2014	"Imagine" (UNICEF: World version)	Various	Herself	
2021	"Courteney Cox"	Connor Price	Herself	
2021	"Right on Time"	Brandi Carlile	Director	

== Awards and honors ==
=== Accolades ===
Year	Association	Category	Work	Result	Ref.
1995	American Comedy Awards	Funniest Supporting Female Performer in a Television Series	Friends	Nominated	
1995	People's Choice Awards	Favorite Performer in a New Television Program	Friends	Won	
1996	Screen Actors Guild Awards	Outstanding Performance by an Ensemble in a Comedy Series	Friends	Won	
1997	Nickelodeon Kids' Choice Awards	Favorite Television Actress	Friends	Nominated	
1998	Blockbuster Entertainment Awards	Favorite Actress – Horror	Scream 2	Nominated	
1998	Saturn Awards	Best Supporting Actress	Scream 2	Nominated	
1999	American Comedy Awards	Funniest Supporting Female Performer in a Television Series	Friends	Nominated	
1999	Screen Actors Guild Awards	Outstanding Performance by an Ensemble in a Comedy Series	Friends	Nominated	
2000	Nickelodeon Kids' Choice Awards	Favorite Television Friends (shared with Jennifer Aniston & Lisa Kudrow)	Friends	Nominated	
2000	Screen Actors Guild Awards	Outstanding Performance by an Ensemble in a Comedy Series	Friends	Nominated	
2000	Teen Choice Awards	Choice Movie – Chemistry (shared with David Arquette)	Scream 3	Won	
2000	TV Guide Awards	Editor's Choice Award	Friends	Won	
2001	Blockbuster Entertainment Awards	Favorite Actress – Horror (Internet Only)	Scream 3	Nominated	
2001	Screen Actors Guild Awards	Outstanding Performance by an Ensemble in a Comedy Series	Friends	Nominated	
2001	The Stinkers Bad Movie Awards	Most Annoying Fake Accent – Female	3000 Miles to Graceland	Nominated	
2001	The Stinkers Bad Movie Awards	Worst Supporting Actress	3000 Miles to Graceland	Nominated	
2002	Golden Raspberry Awards	Worst Supporting Actress	3000 Miles to Graceland	Nominated	
2002	Golden Raspberry Awards	Worst Screen Couple (shared with Kurt Russell)	3000 Miles to Graceland	Nominated	
2002	Screen Actors Guild Awards	Outstanding Performance by an Ensemble in a Comedy Series	Friends	Nominated	
2002	Teen Choice Awards	Choice TV Actress – Comedy	Friends	Nominated	
2003	Screen Actors Guild Awards	Outstanding Performance by an Ensemble in a Comedy Series	Friends	Nominated	
2003	Teen Choice Awards	Choice TV Actress – Comedy	Friends	Nominated	
2004	Screen Actors Guild Awards	Outstanding Performance by an Ensemble in a Comedy Series	Friends	Nominated	
2005	Teen Choice Awards	Choice Movie – Hissy Fit	The Longest Yard	Nominated	
2006	The Stinkers Bad Movie Awards	Worst Supporting Actress	Zoom	Nominated	
2006	TV Land Awards	Most Wonderful Wedding (shared with Matthew Perry)	Friends	Nominated	
2007	TV Land Awards	Break Up That Was So Bad It Was Good (shared with Michael J. Fox)	Family Ties	Nominated	
2010	Gold Derby Awards	Comedy Lead Actress	Cougar Town	Won	
2010	Golden Globe Awards	Best Actress in a Television Series – Comedy or Musical	Cougar Town	Nominated	
2010	The Streamy Awards	Best Guest Star in a Web Series	Web Therapy	Nominated	
2010	Women's Image Network Awards	Actress Comedy Series	Cougar Town	Nominated	
2011	Critics' Choice Television Awards	Best Actress in a Comedy Series	Cougar Town	Nominated	
2011	Gold Derby Awards	Comedy Lead Actress	Cougar Town	Nominated	
2011	People's Choice Awards	Favorite Television Comedy Actress	Cougar Town	Nominated	
2012	People's Choice Awards	Favorite Television Comedy Actress	Cougar Town	Nominated	
2014	People's Choice Awards	Favorite Cable Television Actress	Cougar Town	Nominated	
2015	People's Choice Awards	Favorite Cable Television Actress	Cougar Town	Nominated	
2017	Daytime Emmy Awards	Outstanding Game Show	Celebrity Name Game	Nominated	
2021	Primetime Emmy Awards	Outstanding Variety Special (Pre-Recorded)	Friends: The Reunion	Nominated	
2022	Saturn Awards	Best Actress in a Network or Cable Television Series	Shining Vale	Nominated	
2023	MTV Movie & TV Awards	Best Fight (shared with Ghostface)	Scream VI	Won	

=== Honors ===
- 1995: Honored as the Female Discovery of the Year by the Golden Apple Awards.
- 2010: Honored with the Lifetime Achievement Award by the Women's Image Network.
- 2010: Honored with the Lucy Award by the Women in Film Crystal + Lucy Awards.
- 2023: Honored with a star on the Hollywood Walk of Fame.
