= GXTP =

- Years active: 2022–present
- Label: NFARTAM Ltd.
- Members: Jason Paul; Sasha Sirota; Triple Sixx
- Website: Official website

GXTP is an American rock group made up of Jason Paul, Sasha Sirota, and Triple Sixx. In 2023, the group released Smoke & Mirrors, its debut album through NFARTAM Ltd. Its singles have included "Quiet Riot" featuring David Bryan, "Foresight", "Lust & Purity", and "Contraband", a collaboration with Mötley Crüe drummer Tommy Lee which peaked at No. 12 on the Billboard U.S. Hard Rock Digital Songs.

== Discography ==
=== Studio albums ===
Title	Details
Smoke & Mirrors	Released: October 27, 2023; Label: NFARTAM Ltd.; Formats: Digital

=== Singles ===
Year	Title	Chart positions	
Year	Title	US Main.	US Hard Rock Digi.
2022	"Foresight"	—	—
2023	"Contraband" (feat. Tommy Lee)	33	12
2023	"Lust & Purity"	—	—
