= List of drinking games =

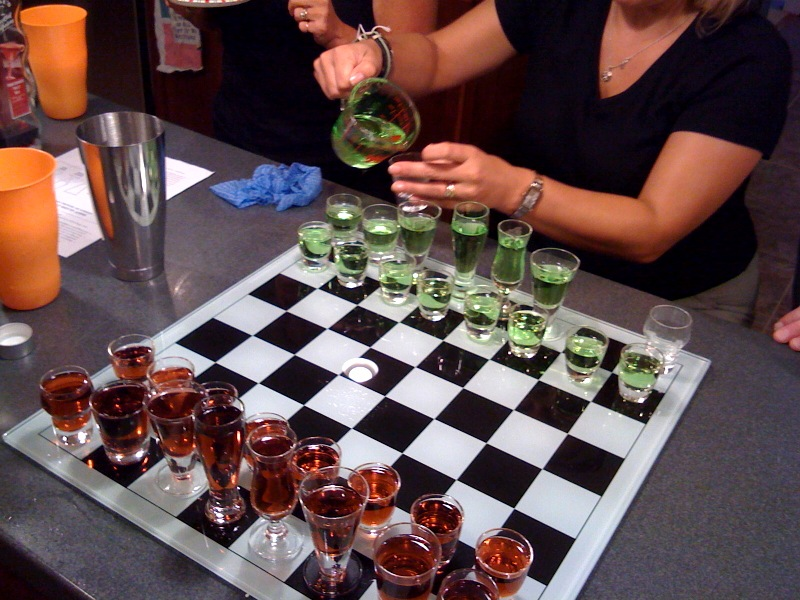
A game of chess with alcoholic drinks as pieces

This is a list of drinking games. Drinking games involve the consumption of alcoholic beverages. Evidence of the existence of drinking games dates back to antiquity. They have been banned at some institutions, particularly colleges and universities.

== 0-9 ==
- 21

== A ==
- Around the world

== B ==
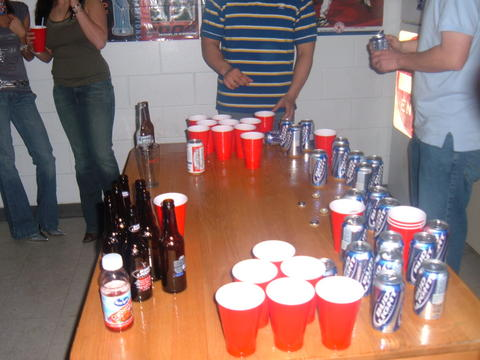
Beer pong is a drinking game in which players throw ping pong balls across a table, attempting to land each ball in a cup of beer on the other end.

- Bar-hopping
- Bartok (card game)
- Baseball
- Beer bong
- Beer can pyramid
- Beer checkers
- Beer die
- Beer helmet
- Beer mile
- Beer pong
- Beer pong (paddles)
- Biscuit
- Boat race
- Boot of beer
- Buffalo

== C ==
- Captain
- Cheers to the Governor

== D ==
- Detonator
- Dizzy bat

== F ==
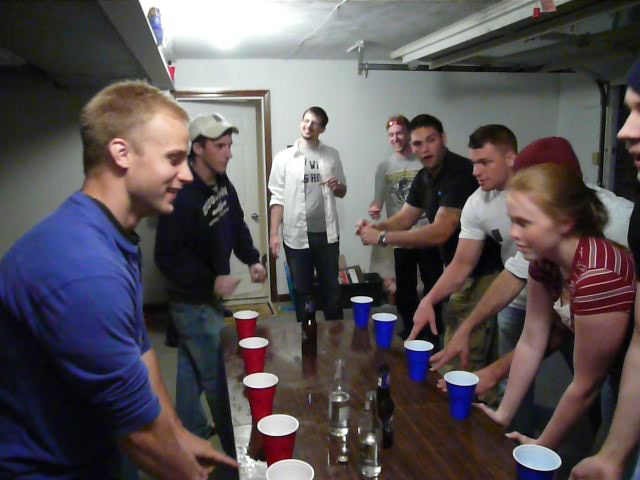
People playing flip cup

- Fingers
- Flip cup
- Fuzzy duck

== G ==
- Goon of Fortune

== H ==
The set-up for horserace

- Hi, Bob
- High jinks
- Horserace

== I ==
- Ice luge
- Icing

== K ==
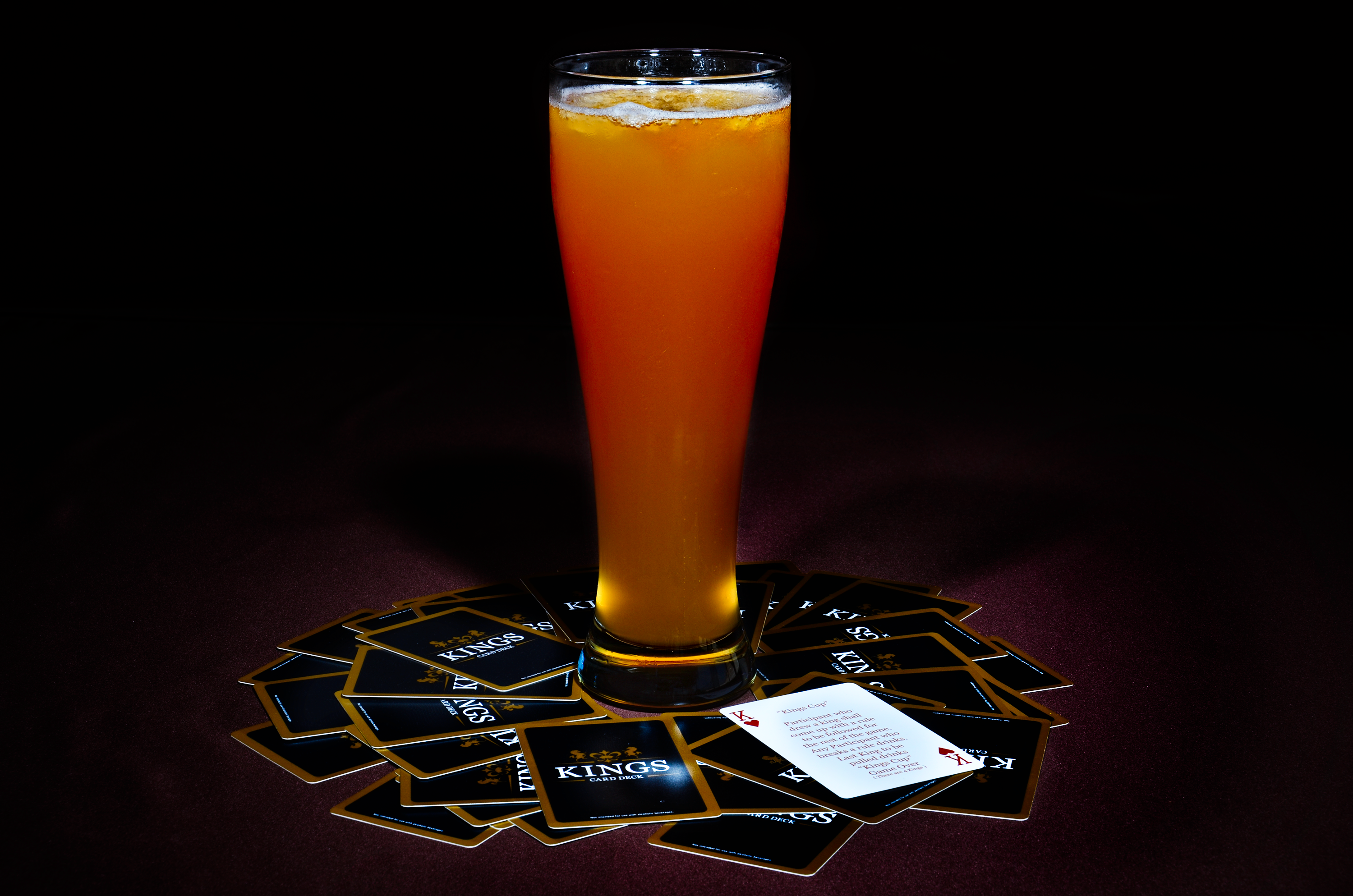
Kings uses playing cards

- Kastenlauf
- Keg stand
- Kings
- Kinito
- Kottabos

== L ==
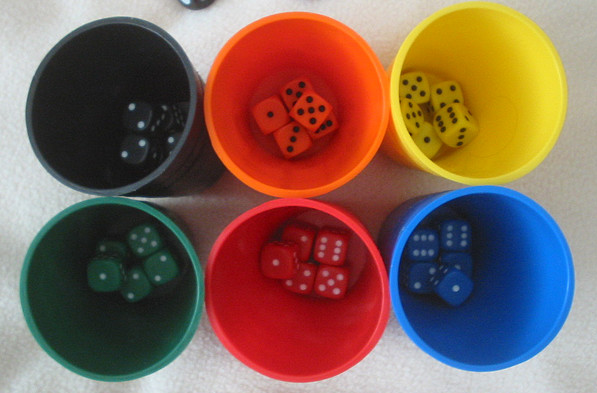
In liar's dice, five six-sided dice are used per player, with dice cups used for concealment.

- Liar's dice

== M ==
- Matchbox

== N ==
- Neknominate
- Never have I ever

== P ==
- Pass-Out
- Patruni e sutta
- Power hour
- President
- Pub golf
- Pyramid
- Pyramid of fire

== Q ==
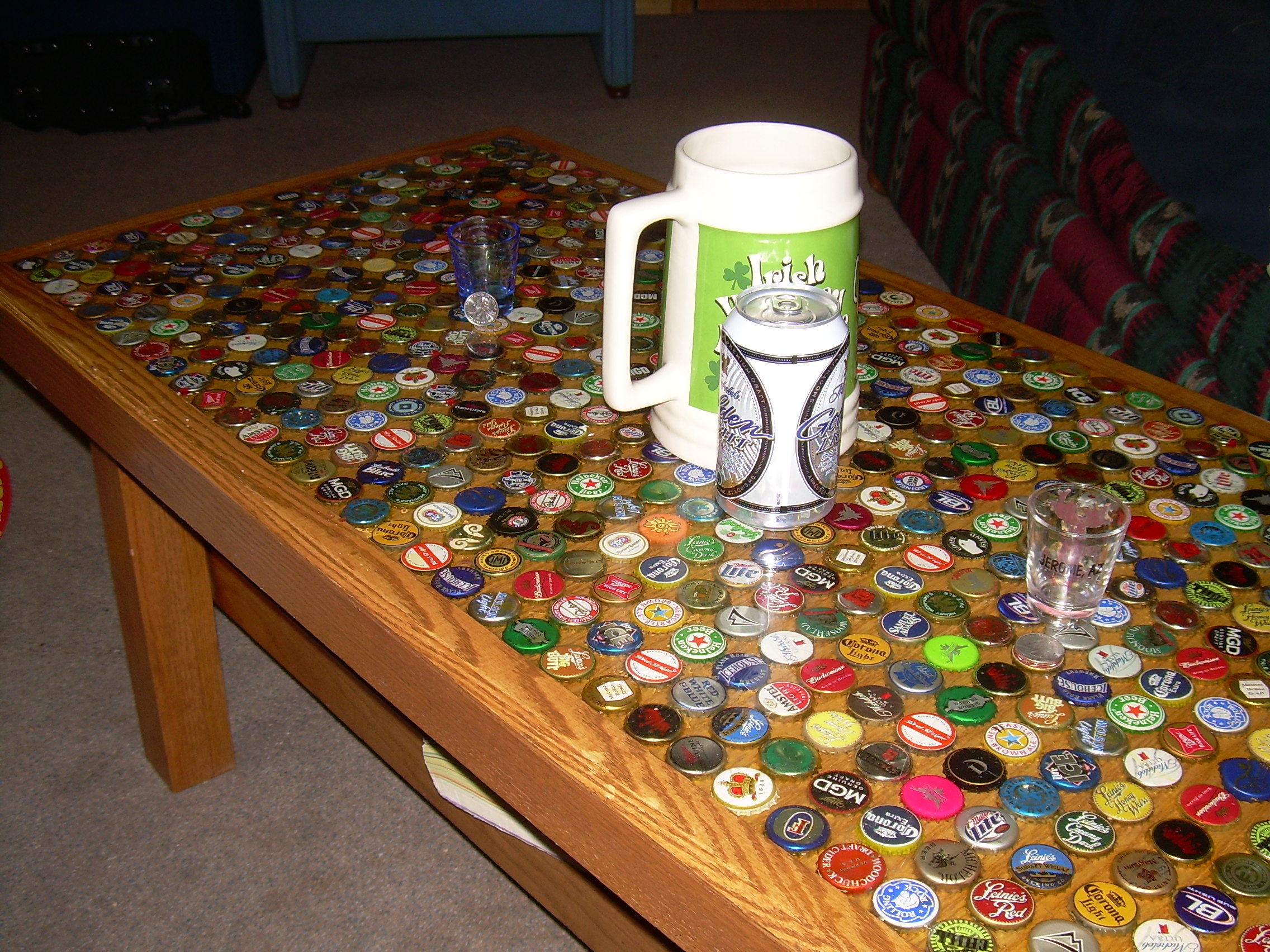
The arrangement for a variation of quarters named "speed quarters" (enlarge to view detail)

- Quarters
- Quodlibet

== R ==
- Ring of fire

== S ==
A person playing slam pong

- Schlafmütze
- Scum
- Sevens, elevens, and doubles
- Ship, captain, and crew
- Shotgunning
- Sinking
- Slam pong
- Snap-dragon
- Spin the bottle
- Spoof

== T ==
- Three man
- Toepen
- True American

== U ==
- Up Jenkins

== W ==
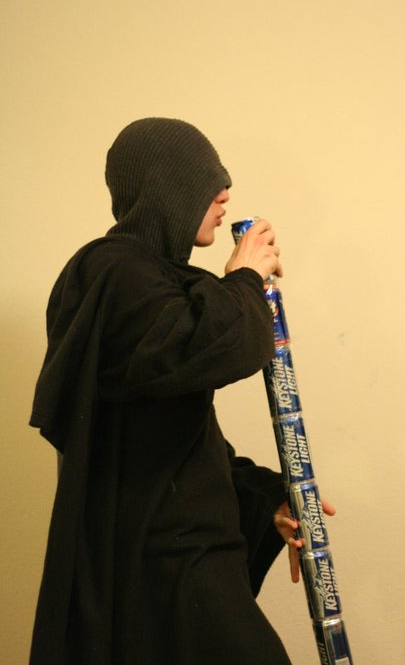
A person playing wizard staff

- Whales Tales (or "Wales Tails")
- Wizard staff

== Y ==
- Yard of ale

== Z ==
- Zoom Schwartz Profigliano

== See also ==
- Beer bong
- Pub crawl
- Pub games – games which are or were played in pubs, bars, inns, and taverns, particularly traditional games played in English pubs. Most are indoor games, though some are played outdoors.
- List of public house topics
- Marathon du Médoc
- Long-distance race involving alcohol
- World Series of Beer Pong
