= Beer bong (disambiguation) =

A beer bong is a device composed of a funnel attached to a tube used to facilitate the rapid consumption of beer.

Beer bong may also refer to:

- "Beer Bong", a song on the NOFX album Liberal Animation
- "Beer Bong", a song on the Atrophy album Socialized Hate
- Beerbongs & Bentleys, the second studio album by American rapper Post Malone

== See also ==
- Beer (disambiguation)
- Bong (disambiguation)
