= Pyramid of fire =

Drinking game

Pyramid of fire is a drinking game among college/university students in Europe and America. Pyramid of fire is a combination of two other drinking games ring of fire and pyramid. The aim of this game is to give people the opportunity to drink fast and in large quantity whilst with a group of friends in a fun and exciting way.

== Equipment ==
- Beer/Other alcoholic drinks
- A deck of playing cards
- A large jug or glass

== Set up ==
The players must make a pyramid of face down cards by stacking them into five rows with each row having the same number of cards according to its row number. (e.g. the bottom row having 5 cards and the top row having 1) Then the dealer must give each player 4 cards and leave the remainder of the stack face down near the jug/glass.

== Game Play ==
=== Ring of fire ===
The first player turns over a card at the bottom left of the pyramid. At the beginning of the game each card will be assigned a rule. When the card is turned over the player who turned over the card has play the rule that it is associated with it in Ring of Fire. (a list of possible rules is below)For next player to flip a card will be the person sitting to the left of the last person to flip a card and once the rule for each card has been played you must also play the pyramid rule of that card too.

=== Pyramid ===
So a card has been turned over and the Ring of Fire rule has been played now each player looks at the 4 cards in their hand. If they have the card that has been turned over they may tell any other player on the table to consume a number of figures of their drinking according to the row on which the card has been turned over.(1st row = 1 figure, 2nd row = 2 fingers, 3rd row = 3 fingers, etc.) Now the player who has to drink has a choice, as they cannot see the other players cards they don't actually know if that player holds the card they are telling them to drink over so they can decide if they think the player is lying to challenge them. If a challenge is called and the player who told the challenger to drink has the card being played the challenger must drink double the number of fingers but if the player does not have the card being played the player must drink the fingers instead.

== Possible Ring of Fire Rules ==
Rule Name	Instruction
"Waterfall"	To "water fall" the player who drew the card starts drinking their beverage and everyone else also starts to drink. The person who drew the card is the only person allowed to stop drinking first (unless another player runs out of drink) and each player is not allowed to stop drinking until the person to their left stops drinking.
"Chicks"	All females on the table must drink two fingers.
"Dicks"	All males on the table must drink two fingers.
"Question Master"	When a person becomes question master they remain question master until the next question master card is drawn. If a player is question master if they ask another player a question and they answer without saying "fuck you" first then that player must drink 2 fingers.
"Thumb Master"	When a person becomes thumb master they remain thumb master until the next thumb master card is drawn. If a player is the thumb master they may casually place their thumb on the edge of the table whenever they feel like it and the last player to notice and put their thumb on the table must drink 2 fingers.
"Make up a Rule"	When a player picks up this card they may assign a rule to the game which becomes in place until the end of the game and any player to disobey this rule must drink 2 fingers. (e.g. no swearing)
