= Bong (disambiguation) =

A bong is a device used for smoking cannabis, tobacco, or other substances.

Bong may also refer to:

== Arts, entertainment, and media ==
- Bong game, a radio game show
- Doctor Bong, a fictional character from the Marvel Comics universe

== People ==
- Bong (surname), a surname in Chinese, Korean, Swedish, and other cultures (including a list of people with the surname)
- Baik Bong (fl. 1960s), North Korean writer
- Bong Coo (born 1948), Filipino world champion tenpin bowler
- Bong Galanza (born 1992), Filipino basketball player
- Bong Go (born 1974), Filipino presidential aide
- Bong Hawkins (born 1967), Filipino basketball player
- Bong Pascual (born 1970), Filipino basketball referee
- Bong Ramos (born 1961), Filipino basketball coach
- Bong Revilla (born 1966), Filipino actor and politician

== Places ==
- Bong, Maasbree, Venlo, Netherlands, a hamlet
- Bong, Velden, Venlo, Netherlands, a hamlet
- Bong County, Liberia
  - Bong Town, Liberia
- Bong Recreation Area, Wisconsin, USA, a state park

== Other uses ==
- Bong (term), an affectionate slang for Bengali people from West Bengal, India
- Bong, an onomatopœia of the sound of a bell or gong
- Bong (climbing), a type of piton
- Beer bong or funneling, a drinking game where the aim is to rapidly ingest large quantities of beer or other beverages
- Bong, a modern slang term for a person from the United Kingdom with the name jokingly taken from the bell chime of Big Ben
- The Bongs, an Indian Bengali-language film series, consisting of
  - The Bong Connection (2006)
  - The Bongs Again (2017)

== See also ==
- Bang (disambiguation)
- Bhang
- Bing (disambiguation)
- Bongbong Marcos (born 1957), Filipino politician and 17th president of the Philippines
- Bongbong (disambiguation)
- Boong
- Bung
- Blue Origin New Glenn (BO-NG), an orbital spacelaunch rocket
