= Horserace (disambiguation) =

Horserace may refer to:

- Horse racing
- Horserace (drinking game)
- Horse race journalism
