= Whale Tale =

Whale Tale may refer to:

- project Whale Tale, to develop carrier-based reconnaissance aircraft U-2Gs
- Whale Tale - Little Einsteins television episode 4
- Whales Tales - a venerable, fast-paced drinking game.
