= Wizard staff =

Drinking game

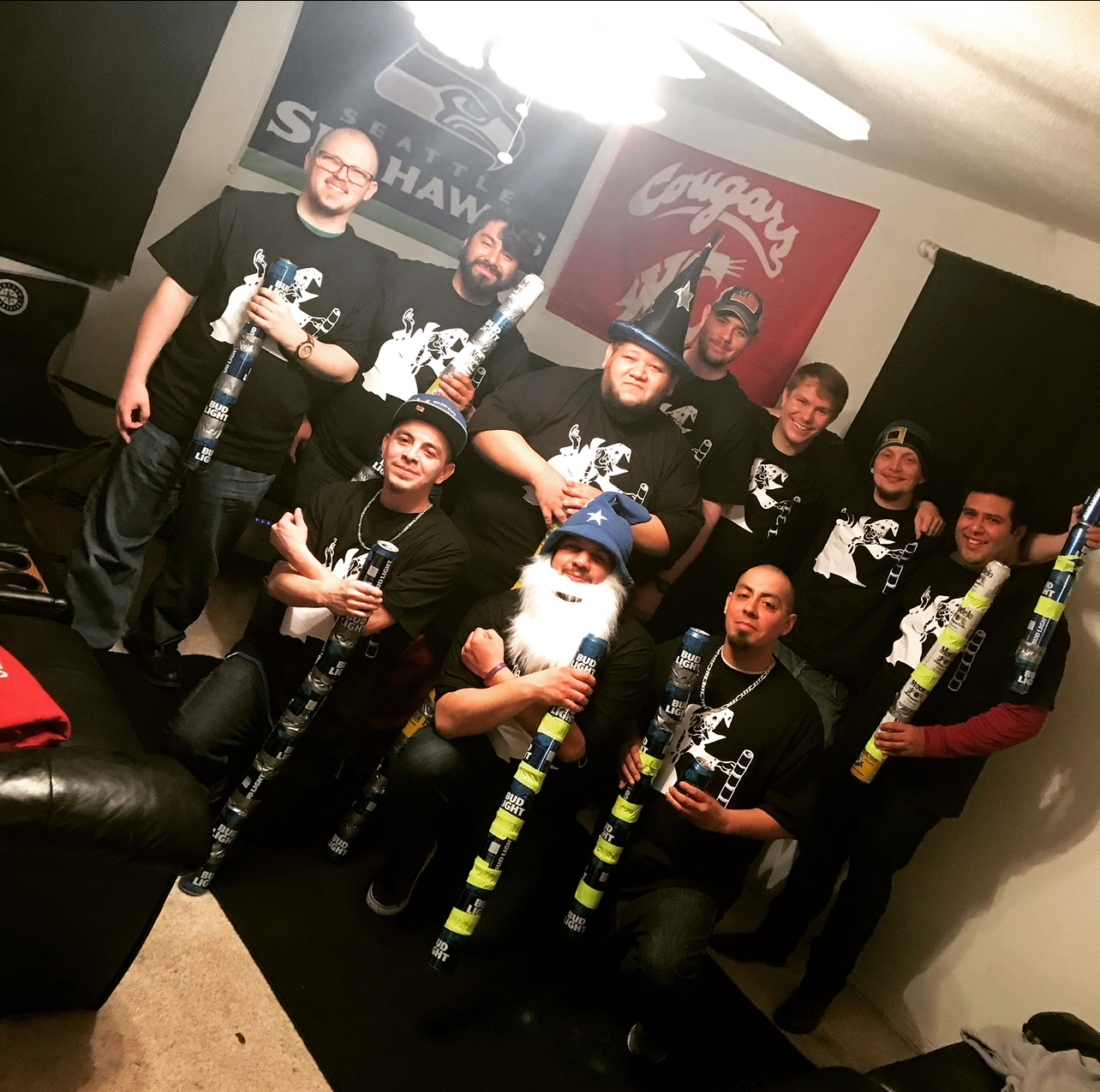
- Other names: Wizard staff, wizarding diploma
- Players: 2+
- Setup time: none
- Playing time: variable
- Alcohol(s) used: Beer (cans), Hard liquor

Wizard staff (also known as wisest wizard or wizard sticks or wizard) is a drinking game in which players play individually in an attempt to consume more beer than their opponents. As a player drinks, their current can of beer is taped to the top of their previous cans before being opened. The beer is then opened and consumed from the top of the staff, making the task more difficult as more beers are consumed, not only because of increased inebriation, but also because it simply becomes more physically challenging as the staff becomes taller.

Once a staff is taller than its owner, that person gains "wizard status". At the end of the game, the player with the longest staff is declared the "wisest wizard".

== Gameplay ==
After consuming a can, the player levels up and another can is duct taped on top of the first one. Each can consumed counts as one level, so upon finishing the first beer, the player becomes a Level 1 wizard (although, until the staff reaches their height, they are still classified as a "wizard in training").

At the beginning of the game, players decide on an interval to fight bosses, usually every five levels. These "bosses" are shots named after the hard liquor they contain. For example, Boss Daniel's would be a shot of Jack Daniel's whiskey. Taking these shots is required to advance to the next level. The idea is to have multiple brands of hard liquor so that a different boss can be fought at each interval.

=== Variations ===
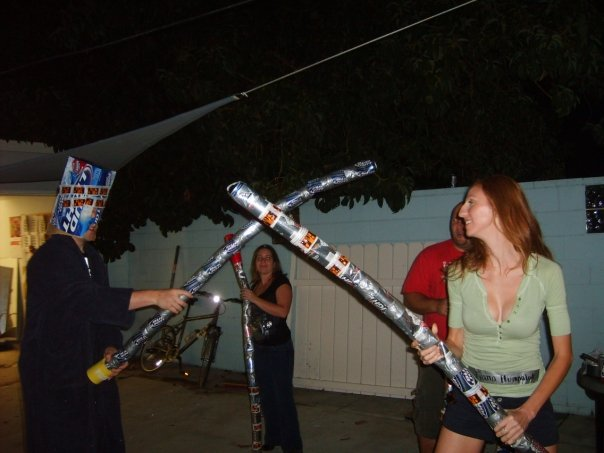
Dueling wizards

White wizard
Once a player reaches level 10, they become a white wizard. When another player becomes a white wizard, they fight each other with their staffs. The wizard who breaks his opponent's staff becomes the new white wizard.
"Feeling wise"
Players may not state that they are drunk, but must instead call it "feeling wise". If a player does say "drunk", "intoxicated" or some similar term, they must chug a beer and are not allowed to add it to their staff.
Battle wizards
After completion of the 10 levels, all wizards remaining standing have a 'staff fight'. The wisest wizard (first to 10) will typically win, as their staff is the largest and strongest.

=== Origin ===
Games of wizard staff were recorded during Anti Hero + Girl Skateboards "Beauty and the Beast" Tour in May 2008, although the game is thought to have originated closer to the early 2000s.

== See also ==
- List of drinking games
