= Beer pong (paddle game) =

Drinking game

Beer pong (also known as Dartmouth pong or Backgammon or Paddle or Mongoose) is a drinking game loosely based on ping pong that involves the use of paddles to hit a ping pong ball into cups on the opposing side. The origin of beer pong is generally credited to Dartmouth College.

== History ==
It has been attributed to a Dartmouth College fraternity party. An Alpha Phi Delta fraternity alumnus, David Thielscher, class of 1954, recalled in an interview for The Dartmouth newspaper that beer pong was played when he was an undergraduate. History professor Jere Daniell '55 stated that he played the game as a student, and Bob Shirley '57 stated that he began playing in 1956. Shirley suggests that the game began when spectators rested their cups of beer on a table during a ping-pong game. One of the earliest published photographs depicting a game of pong appeared in Dartmouth's 1968 yearbook Aegis (page 304). By 1976, students began publishing articles about the game.

In the early 1970s, Dartmouth College briefly sanctioned the game as an intramural sport, making it the only college-sponsored drinking contest in the country. In 1977, Dartmouth ended this practice. This official derecognition did not reduce beer pong activity at Dartmouth or elsewhere, but would lead to many new variations on the game. By the mid-1980s Pong was well established at several universities, including Bowdoin College, Lehigh University, Lafayette College, University of Pennsylvania, Princeton University, Whitman College, and Williams College.

According to a 1999 article in The New York Times, pong "has been part of fraternity life for at least 40 years, as hallowed as rush or Winter Carnival". Other Ivy League newspapers have called Dartmouth "the spiritual home of beer pong", and characterized pong as "a way for Dartmouth frat boys to get drunk [that] has become what is arguably America's favorite drinking game".

=== Statistics ===
A 2004 survey of Dartmouth students provided these statistics:

- About 60 percent of students had played pong at least once within the two weeks prior to the survey.
- About 20 percent of students have never played pong.
- Tree requires the average team to consume 7.3 drinks, Shrub 5.7 drinks, Line/Death 5.2 drinks, and Ship 7.4 drinks.

== Variants ==
=== Slam pong ===
A slam pong player (1994)

In the late 1970s Slam pong evolved. Slam pong is a fast-moving variant of beer pong that retains some of the rules of table tennis and includes others from volleyball. The "slam" in slam pong refers to the action of slamming a table tennis ball with a paddle into a plastic cup of beer placed on the table, the fundamental way of scoring points in the game.

In Slam pong teams have only two players and players have only one beer cup on the table each. For a volley to be legal both players on a team are required to strike the ball with their paddles before the ball can strike the table or beer cups.

One of the earliest documented records of slam pong comes from Chris Robinson, Dartmouth College class of 1986, who recalled playing slam pong when he was an undergraduate. An article in the March, 1986 issue of Playboy magazine describes slam pong being played by the brothers of Psi Upsilon at Dartmouth. By the early 1990s, slam pong was played in nearly half of all Dartmouth College Greek organizations, and had been introduced to other colleges including Bowdoin College, Bucknell University, Cornell University, Lehigh University, Princeton University, and Williams College, but by the middle of the decade was beginning to decline in popularity. By the early 2000s, slam pong had been almost totally eclipsed by other variations of beer pong, especially Beirut, one of the first variations of beer pong to be widely played across the country. At Dartmouth, lob became the standard variation of beer pong played by undergraduates.

==== Scoring ====
Essentially players are trying to get their ping pong ball into the cups of the opposing team. There are two primary variations for scoring and declaring the winner of a game. In the five-point game, hits count for one point, sinks count for two points, and knockovers count for five points. In the five-point game, whenever a team earns points, both players of that team are expected to drink one fifth of the total volume of their cup for each point. In the four-point variation of the game, hits count for one point, sinks count for up to two points, and knockovers count for up to two points. If a cup is half-full and gets sunk or knocked-over, that counts as only one point. Players in a four-point game are expected to drink half of a single cup for each point. A team cannot lose on a serve. If a team has only one point left, they cannot have the last point scored through their own ineptitude. However, if both teams have only a single point left, a team may "serve out" if others are waiting to play a subsequent game. In a five-point game, the first team to earn five points loses. In a four-point game, the first team to earn four points loses.

== Culture ==
Concerns over binge drinking on college campuses have increased focus on games like beer pong and slam pong. Dartmouth College Anthropology Professor Hoyt Alverson published research work on the beer pong culture at Dartmouth in the early 2000s. Although slam pong had largely been replaced at Dartmouth and elsewhere by other forms of the beer pong game at that time, Alverson noted that the variations played from 1999 through 2002 involved complex social processes. "Beer pong and similar drinking games are not played solely to achieve inebriation, Alverson finds, but instead serve as a competitive outlet for high-achieving students, and a structured atmosphere for peer interaction." Critics of beer pong contend that, regardless of their social nature, these games encourage binge drinking, and should be discouraged.

== See also ==
- List of drinking games
- Beer die
- Beer pong (a paddle-less variant also known as "Beirut")
