= Icing (game) =

Drinking game and Internet meme

Drinking Game
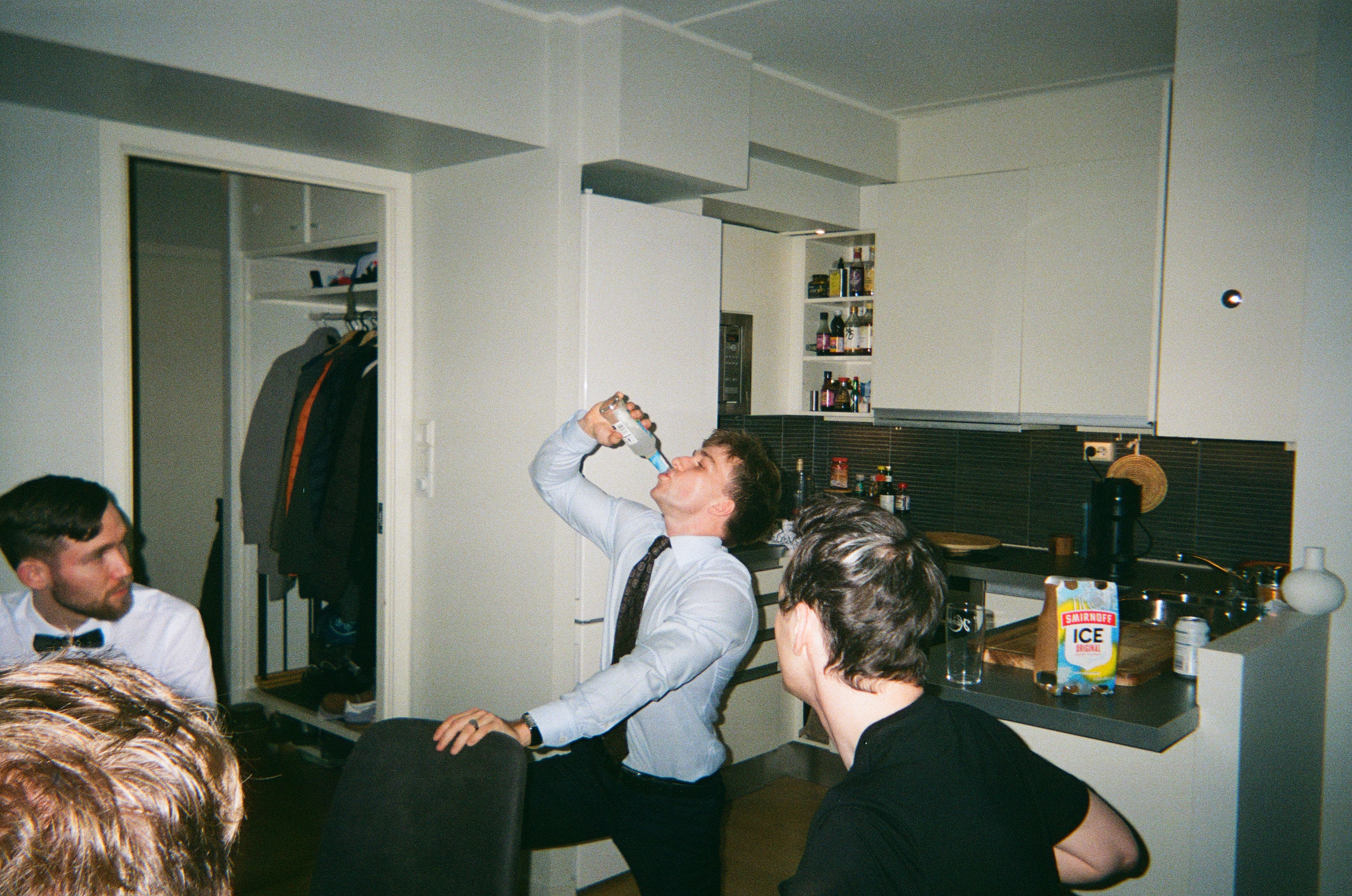
- A man performing the traditional chugging of a bottle of ice after being iced.
- Players: 2+
- Playing time: Ongoing
- Skills: Chugging
- Alcohol used: Smirnoff ice

Icing is a drinking game and Internet meme that gained prominence in 2010 in which one person conceals a bottle of Smirnoff Ice in a place in which another person will find it. Once found, the finder is immediately required to kneel and drink. Participants are encouraged to come up with elaborate ways to present the Smirnoff Ice to their targets by hiding bottles or cans in inconspicuous locations, or in situations where drinking it would be dangerous or embarrassing (e.g. before they attend a meeting).

== Gameplay ==
A player hides a bottle for another person to come across. When the iced person sees the bottle, they must chug the entire Ice. Other players who see the icer hide the Ice are exempt from drinking it. The first person who touches the Ice (the 'iced') but fails to drink the whole bottle cannot ice someone else.

An Ice block occurs when the iced is already carrying a bottle/can of Ice on their person, or is in reach of one without taking a step. If this happens, the icer (challenger) must drop and chug both Ices, the original presented Ice and the new blocking Ice.

Whereas in the United States and Canada "icing" is usually done with smaller 11.2 fl. oz (331 mL) bottles, icing in Europe, particularly among students, is more commonly done with full-size 0.7 liter bottles. These bottles contain more than 2 times the volume and, at 4% ABV, are nearly as strong as their small counterparts (4.5% ABV). This in turn presents a higher danger of drinking to excess.

== Popularity ==
Icing, which was described by The New York Times in June 2010 as "the nation's biggest viral drinking game", grew in popularity shortly after the appearance of the website BrosIcingBros.com in May 2010.

There has been some doubt over whether this is an organic phenomenon, or a marketing stunt by Smirnoff, which the company has denied. Advertising executive Dick Martin said "Beyond the implicit slur on the beverage's taste, I doubt any alcoholic beverage company would want to be associated with a drinking game that stretches the boundaries of good taste and common sense like this one does". The viral spread of the game has seen a boost in sales for the company. Smirnoff insists that the game is "consumer-generated" and has reminded the public to drink responsibly, and Diageo, the product's maker, stated "that 'icing' does not comply with our marketing code, and was not created or promoted by Diageo, Smirnoff Ice, or anyone associated with Diageo."

== See also ==
- List of drinking games
