= Schlafmütze =

German game

- Type: Matching
- Players: 2-12 (4-8 best)
- Skills: Speed, Memory, Sneak
- Age range: Teen+
- Deck: French
- Playing time: 3-15 minutes (sometimes more depending on group size)
- Chance: Easy

Related games
- Donkey • Spit • Speed • Pig and Tongue • Schweinchen

Schlafmütze ("nightcap") is a fast-paced game of matching and bluffing, which is closely related to the English game Spoons. The game requires a minimum of two players, but ideally a minimum of three players, and involves each player passing round cards in an attempt to acquire a hand consisting of all the same value cards. Upon doing so, they silently place their hand of cards on the table. The last player to notice that this has happened is the loser of the round.

== Gameplay ==
=== Setting up ===
In a typical game of Schlafmütze, players will begin each with a hand of four cards, and one player (usually the dealer) has five cards. Sometimes when the group is larger, more than one player may begin with more cards to make game progress more swiftly.

=== Play ===
The player with the five card hand will begin proceedings by passing on one card from their hand to the player to their left. The aim of the game is to end with a four card hand complete with four cards of equal value (for example, four Kings). Players continue to pass around cards, attempting to build a hand of equal cards. When a player receives a card from another player which they have already seen, the card has already been around the entire group, and it can be assumed that no player wants that card, and so it is placed in the center of the playing area (face up). Any player with a card of that value in their playing hand must then put those cards in the pile in the center also (as it is not possible to win on that card).

The player who initially put the card down in the center of the table then picks up a card from the remaining pack, which they add to their hand (to replace the card lost), as do all players who placed a matching card down. Cards continue to be passed around the group, with this cycle of events repeating until one player collects four of a kind. If at any point a player picks up a card from the deck which is of a value which has been put down in the center already, that card can be added to the center pile and they can pick another card to replace it.

During play, no player may at any point place their cards down on the table/floor. Each player must hold all of their cards throughout the game in their hand until they either win (by collecting four of a kind), or notice another player has done so (see Winning below).

=== Winning ===
The winner of the game Schlafmütze is the player who first collects four of a kind. However, unlike in many of its sister card games, the winner does not announce when they have collected said cards. Instead, they place their cards face down on the table, or playing area. This is usually done slyly so as not to notify other players immediately. It is for this reason that no player is permitted to place their cards down at any point during the game, apart from when they have won the game.

Once the player has placed their cards faced down, other players should do the same upon realizing their co-player has won (i.e. when the winner puts their cards down, every other player who notices this also puts their cards down). If the original winner puts their cards down carefully, it is less obvious to other players which means some players may play on for a short while before noticing. Sometimes, players who have put their cards down will continue to pass cards around (not actually playing the game), so as to give the image of playing, until the point where other players eventually realize they are out.

The loser of the game is the last player to put their hand face down on the playing table. As a forfeit they have to wear a nightcap (German: Schlafmütze, hence the name) for the duration of the next game.

== Variation ==
Sometimes a variation of Schlafmütze is played which involves dealing out a series of 'punishments' to the losing player. Upon completing a round of the game, the deck is collected and re-shuffled, and then placed face down next to the dealer (or the person to the left of the dealer if the dealer lost). The loser then chooses any card of the pack, and the dealer deals out every card in order from the bottom of the deck until reaching the loser's chosen card (so any number of cards, representing the number of punishments gained, between one card and the full 52 card deck could be awarded here). For example, if the loser chose the Seven of Hearts, the deck is dealt from the bottom, one by one, until coming to that card. The number of cards dealt in this new pile denotes the number of 'punishments' that player, the loser, will receive.

Each punishment is done one-by-one, in turn around the player order. Different suits represent different types of punishment, which are usually agreed upon by the players beforehand. The higher the number on the card face (usually playing Aces as the highest card), the more severe the punishment.

This variation is more often played as a drinking game.

== See also ==
- Spoons
- Drinking games

== Literature ==
- _ (undated). Spielregelheft ("game rules book"), Piatnik, Vienna.
- _ (1973). Kartenspiele für jung und alt, für Anfänger und Fortgeschrittene, Cologne : Buch u. Zeit Verlag, p. 113
- Anton, Friedrich (1889). Encyklopädie der Spiele, Leipzig.
- Kansil, Joli Quentin, ed. (2004). Official Rules of Card Games, 90th edition, The United States Playing Card Company.
- Morehead, Albert H., Richard L. Frey and Geoffrey Mott-Smith (1991). The New Complete Hoyle Revised Doubleday, New York.
- Morehead, Albert H. and Geoffrey Mott-Smith (1983). Hoyle’s Rules of Games 2nd revised edition. Signet.
- Parlett, David (1990). The Oxford Guide to Card Games Oxford University Press, Oxford and New York
- Parlett, David (1992/96). Oxford Dictionary of Card Games, Oxford University Press, Oxford and New York.
