= Around the world (card game) =

Card-based drinking game

Around the World
- Alternative names: Up the River, Down the River, Ride the Bus
- Type: Drinking
- Players: 2+
- Skills: Card Counting
- Cards: 52
- Deck: French
- Rank (high→low): Ace (A) - Deuce (2)
- Play: Clockwise
- Playing time: 8 min.
- Chance: High

Related games
- Bloody Knuckles

Around the world is a card-based drinking game, similar to president, but more complex and at the same time quicker. The game requires one standard (52-card) deck of playing cards. More decks can be added to accommodate additional players and increase difficulty.

The game is also known as Irish poker, ride the bus, Chico high low, monkey balls, Chef's deal, foam game, North Carolina, Up and down the river, cannonball, Charleston special, buja, Death Valley and unlucky 'sevens' seven.

== Rules ==
The game is divided into two rounds. The first is a guessing or probabilistic round where players must make predictions about the card to be drawn, while the second is completely based on chance.

=== Round One ===
In the first phase of the game, each player must make a prediction about the card to be drawn on their turn.

The dealer deals each player 4 cards face up but before dealing each card, the dealer asks the player a question about the card. If the player guesses correctly, they may "give" a drink (i.e. select a rival player who must drink). If their guess is incorrect they must instead "take" a drink. The players keep the cards that are dealt to them as they are required for the later queries and are the basis of the second round; The questions are:

==== Card One ====
For the first card, the player must predict the color of the card draw, "red" (hearts and diamonds) or "black" (clubs and spades).

==== Card Two ====
For the second card, the player must predict whether the value of the card drawn will be higher or lower than the first card they were dealt. A third, legitimate, but rarely chosen option is "same", where the card is predicted to be of the same value as the first card.

Values are usually ordered deuce through ace, but other sequences, (such as ace low) are possible.

==== Card Three ====
For the third card, the player predicts whether the value of the card drawn will be between the values of the first two cards, "in", or outside of those values, "out". For example, if the value of the card drawn in round 2 is 9, and the next card drawn is 2, the value of the card is drawn between the range 9 - 2 (cards 9, 10, J, Q, K, A) As with card two, there is a third option of "same", which is a prediction that the value will match one of the two cards already present.

==== Card Four ====
Unlike the second and third questions, the fourth card's question is not (directly) related to the cards drawn before it. Rather, the player simply predicts which suit the card will be. Depending on rules agreed upon before the game, the player will guess one suit, or simply guess "same" or "different" with regard to the suit drawn as to whether it is the same as the original three cards dealt or different from them.

=== Round Two ===
Unlike the first round, the second phase of the game is entirely chance based and all players participate at the same time, rather than taking turns as in round one.

The dealer deals eight cards, face down, from the deck, placing them in two columns, the "give" column and the "take" column.

The dealer then flips each card over in sequence, starting with a "take" card, then proceeding to the "give" card, and then moving to the next position in the column. If any of a player's cards (dealt to them in the first part) match the value of the revealed card, they must take or give drinks. If multiple cards in a player's possession match the revealed value, they are each counted separately.

The quantity of drinks each card is worth increases as the cards are revealed. The values are traditionally, "one drink", "two drinks", "four drinks", and "half a beer". If mixed drinks are being used, "half a beer" is considered to be the same as half a glass. If shots are being used (not recommended), there is no established value of "half a beer", but the implication is that a large quantity should be consumed.

When a player is giving multiple drinks, they may, at their option, split them up amongst multiple players. Splitting up a "half a beer" can sometimes be contentious as the precise relationship of this abstract quantity to an integer number of drinks is undefined within the rules of the game, however, "eight drinks" is commonly used in lieu of "half a beer".

== Variations ==
- The increasing drink value of each card in the second round may also be applied to the first round. This option serves to increase the quantity of alcohol consumed.
- The values of the cards in the second round may be reduced to a linear sequence of 1-2-3-4. This reduces the drinks consumed and allows for more rounds to be played.
- A face card may be considered to count for twice the standard number of drinks it would otherwise have granted.
- The increasing value of the cards in the second round (and/or the first round if that variation is used) can be increased to one, two, "half a beer", and "a whole beer".
- A fifth card may be dealt in the first round, usually between the 3rd and final card. The question here is "Odd, even or picture card?"
  - This results in players ending with a 5-card hand, and allows for the player with the winning poker hand to overrule any drinks applied in the second round of that game.
- A card may be added to both ends of round two's columns, one being indicated as a "give" and the other as a "take", and following the same rules as round two's columns with each end card being worth "twelve drinks" or a "full beer".
- A different game of the same name features a circle of players each flipping a card in turn, with a different drinking scenario associated with each card (twos allow the player to force another player to drink, sixes make all males drink, etc.) Some cards have a quick game, with the loser drinking. After the card is flipped it is placed under the tab of a beer can until the stack of cards forces the tab open, at which point the player has to drink the entire can.

== See also ==
- List of drinking games
