= Detonator (game) =

Drinking game

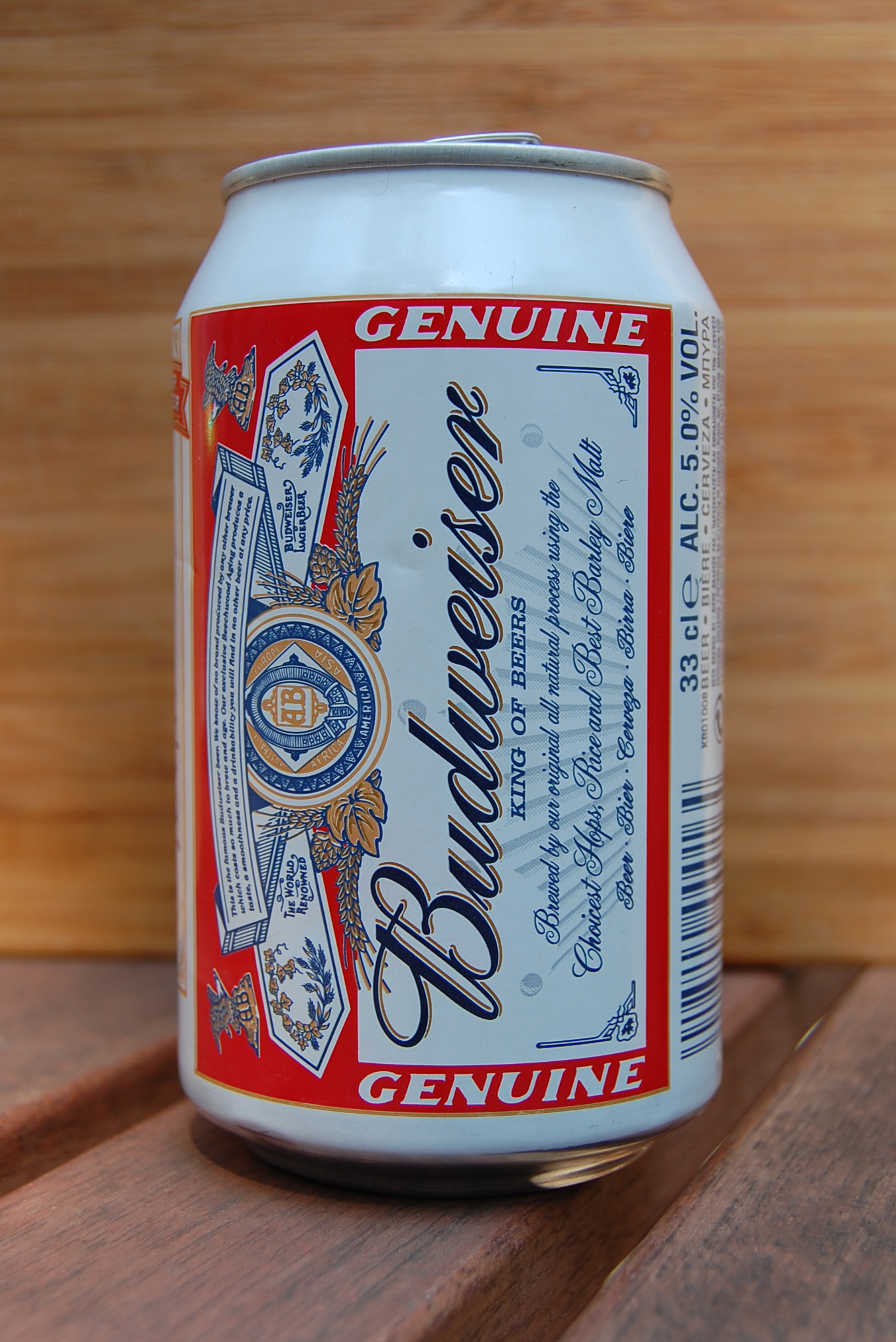
The game of Detonator is played with a single, unopened can of beer

Detonator, also known as Shake Shake Bang Bang, is a drinking game where players smash an unopened beer can against their heads in turn, until the can ruptures. It is played across the United States, and supposedly originated among college students attending Gonzaga University.

== Rules ==
Detonator can be played with two or more people. Players typically gather together in an outdoor setting. Game play starts with an unopened beer can. Players take turns smashing the beer can on their foreheads, yelling "Detonator!" as they do so. The can is then passed to the next player, who repeats the smashing and yelling.

Play continues until the structural integrity of the can is compromised. At this point, one player inevitably ends up covered in beer. This player is declared the winner, and all losers are required to chug a full beer.

== See also ==
- List of drinking games
