= Hi, Bob =

Drinking game

Hi, Bob is a drinking game in which players watch The Bob Newhart Show and consume alcohol whenever a character utters the phrase "Hi, Bob". Believed to have originated on American university campuses in the 1980s, it is thought to be the first documented instance of a drinking game using prompts from a television show to initiate player action.

== History ==
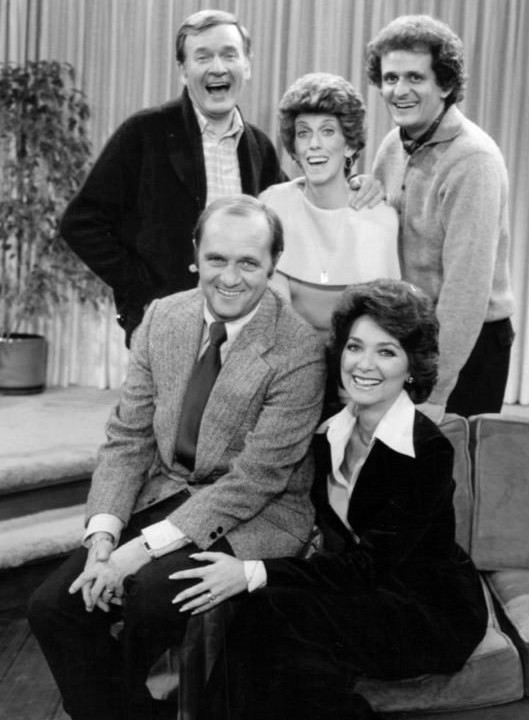
The Bob Newhart Show, whose cast is pictured here in 1977, inspired the game Hi, Bob.

The Bob Newhart Show was an American television program which aired on CBS between 1972 and 1978, subsequently running in syndication for many years thereafter. At various points during episodes of the program, characters would greet the main character, Bob Hartley (portrayed by Bob Newhart), by saying "Hi, Bob".

Hi, Bob is believed to be the first documented instance of a drinking game using prompts from a television show to initiate player action. It may have originated among university students in the 1980s in the United States, who used a line in The Bob Newhart Show as inspiration for the game rules. In 1984 United Press International, citing a just-published book by Lisa Birnbach prepared from two years of her field research on U.S. university campuses, reported it was a "new game on campus". Bob Newhart has said he believes the game may have started at Southern Methodist University.

The February 11, 1995, episode of Saturday Night Live, hosted by Bob Newhart, included a sketch starring Chris Farley and Chris Elliott in which the pair played Hi, Bob.

In a 1998 column Frazier Moore described it as a "classic drinking game", with the implication it was no longer regularly played.

== Response of cast ==
Bob Newhart has partly credited the syndicated appeal of his eponymous television show to Hi, Bob. During a 2001 interview, he also expressed concern that players might drive after playing it. However, that didn't stop him from titling the biography on his official web site "Hi Bob!"

Bill Daily, who played character Howard Borden on The Bob Newhart Show, remarked on the game by noting that "we turned a lot of students into drunks."

== Rules ==
The rules to "Hi, Bob" have been reported differently by various sources.

According to the Tampa Tribune, while watching an episode of The Bob Newhart Show, one or more players are required to consume a shot of alcohol each time a character says "Hi, Bob".

In one reported variation of the game, participants would shout "Hi, Bob!" in response to the utterance of the trigger phrase during the television program. In another variation of the game, shots of alcohol are replaced with cans of beer; each time a character utters the word "Bob", players consume a "generous gulp" of the beverage while the full phrase "Hi, Bob!" prompts complete consumption of the can.

Lisa Birnbach, who witnessed the game in the early 1980s, reported that players would pass a bottle of beer around a room while watching The Bob Newhart Show. According to her, whoever was holding the bottle when the word "Bob" was uttered on the program would have to consume some of the beverage; if the full phrase "Hi, Bob!" was used, then the player would be required to consume the entire bottle.

== See also ==
- List of drinking games
- For All Mankind (TV series), season 1, episode 7
