= Three man =

Drinking game played with dice

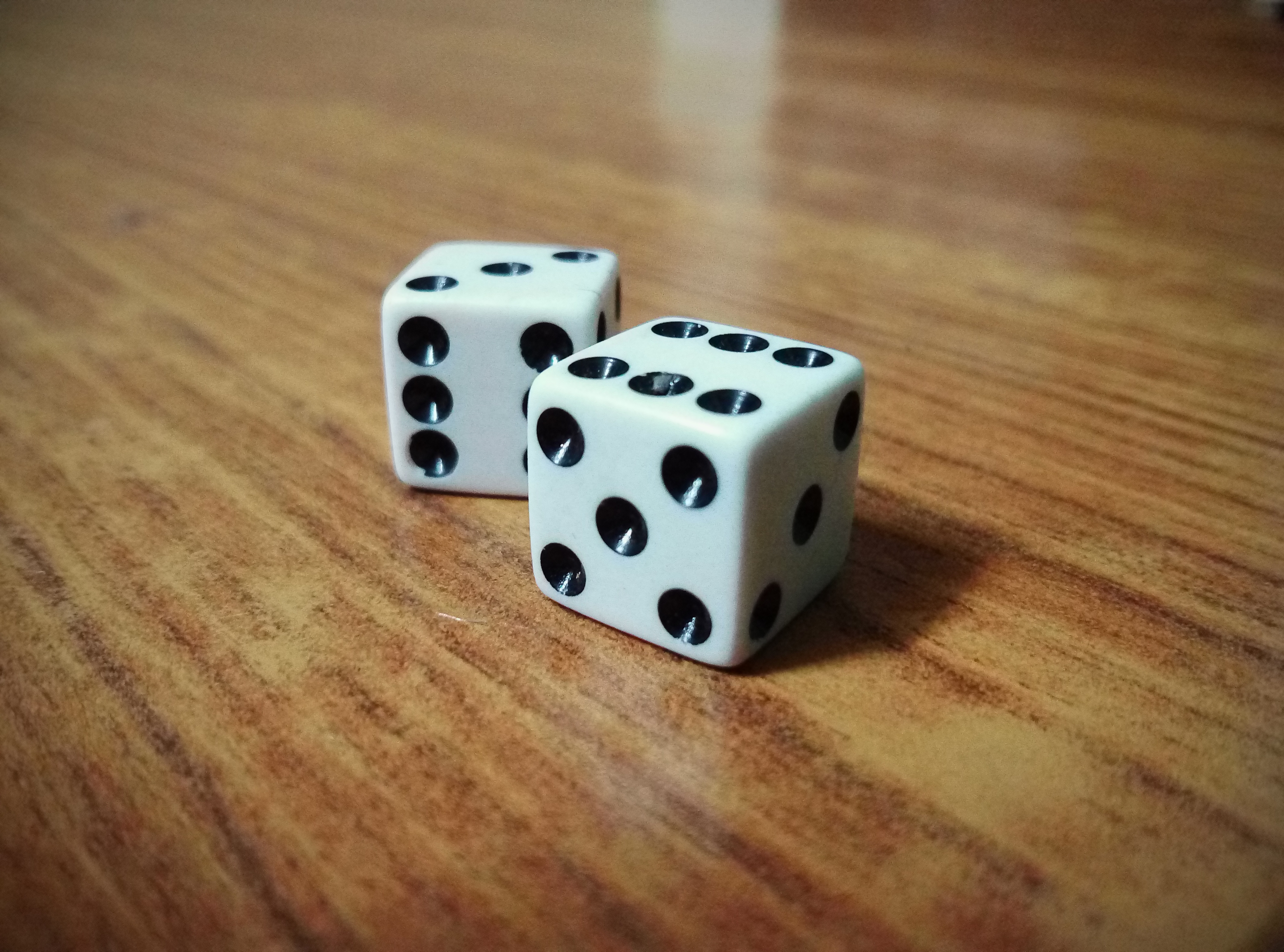
- Genres: Drinking
- Players: 3+
- Setup time: 0
- Playing time: varies

Three man (also referred to as Mr. Three, hat man or the trifecta) is a drinking game played with two dice. It can be played with at least three people but some consider it better with around five.

== Rules ==
A random player is chosen to be the "three man", and may be given a hat to wear to signify this role. Players then take turns around the table to roll two six-sided dice, with one version of the rules stating the following effects:

Threes
For a roll that totals 3, or shows 3 on one of its dice, the three man must take a drink.
Sevens
For any roll that totals 7, the person to the left of roller drinks. (If a 3-4 is rolled, "three man" must also drink.)
Tens
Any roll that totals 10 is called a "social": all players drink.
Elevens
For any roll that totals 11, the person to the right of roller drinks.
Doubles
Whenever a double is rolled, the roller may pass the dice to one or two other players, who roll the dice and apply the result. If this results in another double, the original roller must drink the sum of the dice.

If a roll meets none of these criteria, the player's turn is over.

The role of the three man may change during the game. Some versions of the game allow the three man to pass their role on after taking a drink under the "threes" rule, others have the three man lose their role upon rolling "threes" themselves, with the next person to roll "threes" becoming the new three man.

== Variations ==
In the "doubles" variation, whoever rolls doubles (Player A) can "give" them to another player (Player B), who then rolls both the dice to see how many times they must drink. If B rolls doubles, the dice are returned to A, who must roll and drink twice as many times as the value that they roll (e.g., if A rolls 3 and 2, A must drink 10 times).

In the "party foul" variant, if the dice fall off the table, the player drinks for each fallen die. When a "sloppy jalopy" rule is applied, the player with fallen dice is loudly admonished as a "sloppy jalopy" and immediately becomes the new three man.

One version includes special effects for any roll of 1:

- 1 and 1 follow the usual rules for passing off doubles.
- 1 and 2 makes the roller the three man.
- 1 and 3 makes the three man drink (as with any roll of a 3).
- 1 and 4 thumb to table or floor: last player to place his/her thumb must drink.
- 1 and 5 turn ends.
- When a 1 and 6 is rolled, the player to the left drinks.

Another house rule is a "bathroom penalty": if a player is in the bathroom when it is their turn to roll, they must take a drink for every 5 seconds they are late in returning.

In an Australian version of this game the rules are as follows:

- 1+1: New Rule (You make a rule affecting the current game, little green man,^{[5]} Nicknames etc)
- 1+2: 3 man (You are the three man; put on a hat, every time a three is on the dice drink, remains until someone else rolls this)
- 2-2 3-3 4-4 5-5 6-6 (doubles): Choose a person to fill their drink and finish their drink.
- 7 or 11: Choose a person to fill their drink and finish their drink. If someone has a double, seven or eleven they roll as soon as the person touches the cup and if they get a 7, 11, or double the person must repeat. If a player touches the dice before that, they must finish their drink. On the third time this is rolled, the roller must finish their drink.
- 9: Busta Rhyme (Make up one line of a rhyme, go around table, loser drinks)
- 10: Categories (Select a category, go around the table until someone misses out they drink)

Other rules require the roller to drink on an 11, or the player to the right to drink on a 9. One variant says that on rolling a five, the player must high-five the three man.

== See also ==
- Sevens, elevens, and doubles
- List of drinking games
