= Bongbong (disambiguation) =

Bongbong Marcos (born 1957) is a Filipino politician who is the 17th President of the Philippines.

Bongbong may also refer to:

- Bongbong (rocket)
- Bong Bong, New South Wales, Australia, a ghost town
- Bong Bong Parish, parish in New South Wales, Australia
- Bongbong, Ubay, Bohol, Philippines

== See also ==
- All pages with titles beginning with Bongbong
- All pages with titles containing Bongbong
- Bong (disambiguation)
