= Fuzzy duck =

Drinking game

Fuzzy duck is a drinking game where players sit in a circle and take turns to say the words "fuzzy duck". A player may also opt to say, "does he?", in which case play resumes in the opposite direction with players instead saying "ducky fuzz". If a player says the wrong thing, plays out of turn, or breaks the rhythm of the game, they must drink an agreed-upon measure of an alcoholic beverage.

Sometimes players misspeak the phrases as the spoonerisms "duzzy fuck" ("does he fuck?") or "fucky duzz" ("fuck he does"). The Book of Beer Awesomeness describes the appeal of the game as "watching a prudish player scream out a string of obscenities."

One strategy is, when saying "does he?", to look at the person who would have ordinarily been next. It usually causes this player to continue play and simultaneously causes the player whose turn it really is to say nothing. Both players must drink; one for playing out of turn and the other for breaking the rhythm of the game.

In a test by The Independent it was voted best – equal with ibble dibble – out of nine drinking games.
