= Bunger =

Bunger, Buenger, or Bünger may refer to:

== People ==
- Richard Bunger Evans (born 1942), American composer and pianist; also known as Richard Bunger
- Harold Bunger (1896–1941), American chemist and researcher
- Stan Bunger (born 1956), American broadcast journalist
- Christian Heinrich Bünger (1782–1842), German surgeon and anatomist
- Walter L. Buenger (born 1951), American historian

== Other ==
- Bunger Hills, a coastal range on the Knox Coast in Wilkes Land in Antarctica
- Bunger, alternate name for firecracker
- Bunger, a fictional creature found in Bugsnax

== See also ==
- Bung (disambiguation)
