= Matchbox (drinking game) =

Drinking game

Matchbox is a drinking game of skill played around a table. It can be played by any number of people. The aim is to throw a matchbox such that it lands on its edge or end. It was invented by Liam Peoples of Essex .

== Main Laws ==
A "finger" is the amount of beer, in a straight or "conical" pint glass, covered by one finger on the outside of the glass.

Play proceeds around a circle. The player whose turn it is takes the matchbox and throws it. What happens next depends on how the box lands:

1. End : If the matchbox lands on its end (smallest face) then four fingers are "added" to a penalty pot. Play then continues round the circle.
2. Edge : If the box lands on an edge (middle-sized face; usually the one with striking paper) then it accumulates two fingers in the penalty pot. Play continues.
3. Side : If the matchbox lands on its side (the largest face) then the thrower must drink the total number of fingers accumulated in penalty pot so far. Once this has taken place the pot reverts to zero fingers and play continues. If the pot contains no fingers then play simply continues without penalty.

The matchbox may be labelled as a reminder of the numbers. Also an 'R' on one end and one edge may be used to signify that the direction of play should be reversed (if play it was moving anti-clockwise, passing to the right, the box now moves to the left).

International drinking rules apply. No pointing, left handed drinking only, pinkies must remain on the drinking vessel whilst drink is consumed.

=== Variations ===
As with many drinking games extra or different rules may be used by specific groups. Some are:

- Accidentally flicking a matchbox into a drink incurs an immediate penalty of drinking all the drink that the matchbox has entered for the thrower.
- The matchbox not landing on the table incurs a penalty of finishing their drink plus any accrued finger fines for the thrower.
- Spilling matches from the box is punishable by a fine (a finger or a sip per match).
- If someone throws the matchbox up high so that it hits the ceiling and then lands on its top end, everyone must finish off their current drink; land it on the edge, everyone must drink half of their current drink.
- Continental Box - A round in which the technique for throwing the matchbox must be unusual - using props, additional appendages and manipulation of the box is allowed. Normal throwing rules resume when the box has done a full revolution around the playing group.
- "Mr Chairman" - in games with experienced players, when a multitude of additional rules are used to keep players on their toes (and drinking!) a player is elected as being in charge of the game. "Mr Chairman" runs the game, apportions fines, and generally keeps order. As simple and beneficial as this may sound, responsibility for a successful and enjoyable game rests with Mr Chairman... "with great power comes great responsibility"

== See also ==
- List of drinking games
