= Never have I ever =

Drinking game

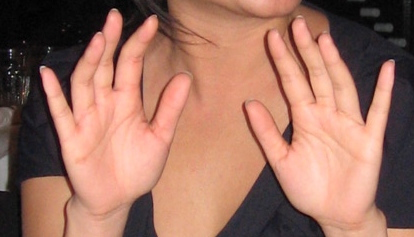
In the variation known as "ten fingers", players keep count on their hands rather than drinking.

"Never have I ever", also known as "I've never.." or "ten fingers", is a drinking game in which players take turns asking other players about things they have not done. Other players who have done this thing respond by taking a drink. A version that requires no drinking, usually played by children and underage adolescents, has players counting scores on their fingers instead.

== Rules ==
The verbal game starts with all players forming a circle. The first player starts by saying a simple statement about something they have never done before starting with "Never have I ever". Anyone who at some point in their life has done the action that the first player says must drink. Then the game continues around the circle, and the next person makes a statement.

An additional rule says that if no one takes a drink, then the one who said the particular "Never have I ever..." statement must take a drink. This rule often forces the players to strategize more and makes for fewer disposable or pointless statements.

A further variation holds that whenever only one person is drinking, that person must give a detailed account of why they are drinking.

Another variety of this game known as "ten fingers" (or sometimes five) involves players raising their fingers at the start of the game, and putting one down whenever something they have ever done is mentioned.

Versions of the game are available on cards or online with pre-written statements which players must admit to have done or not.

Conversation games such as this one can help to build friendships, and players often admit to things that they previously had not. As with truth or dare, the game is often sexual in nature. In some variations, the game may be incorporated into other drinking games, such as kings.

== See also ==
- In vino veritas
- List of drinking games
- Purity test
