= Beer die =

Drinking game

Beer Die
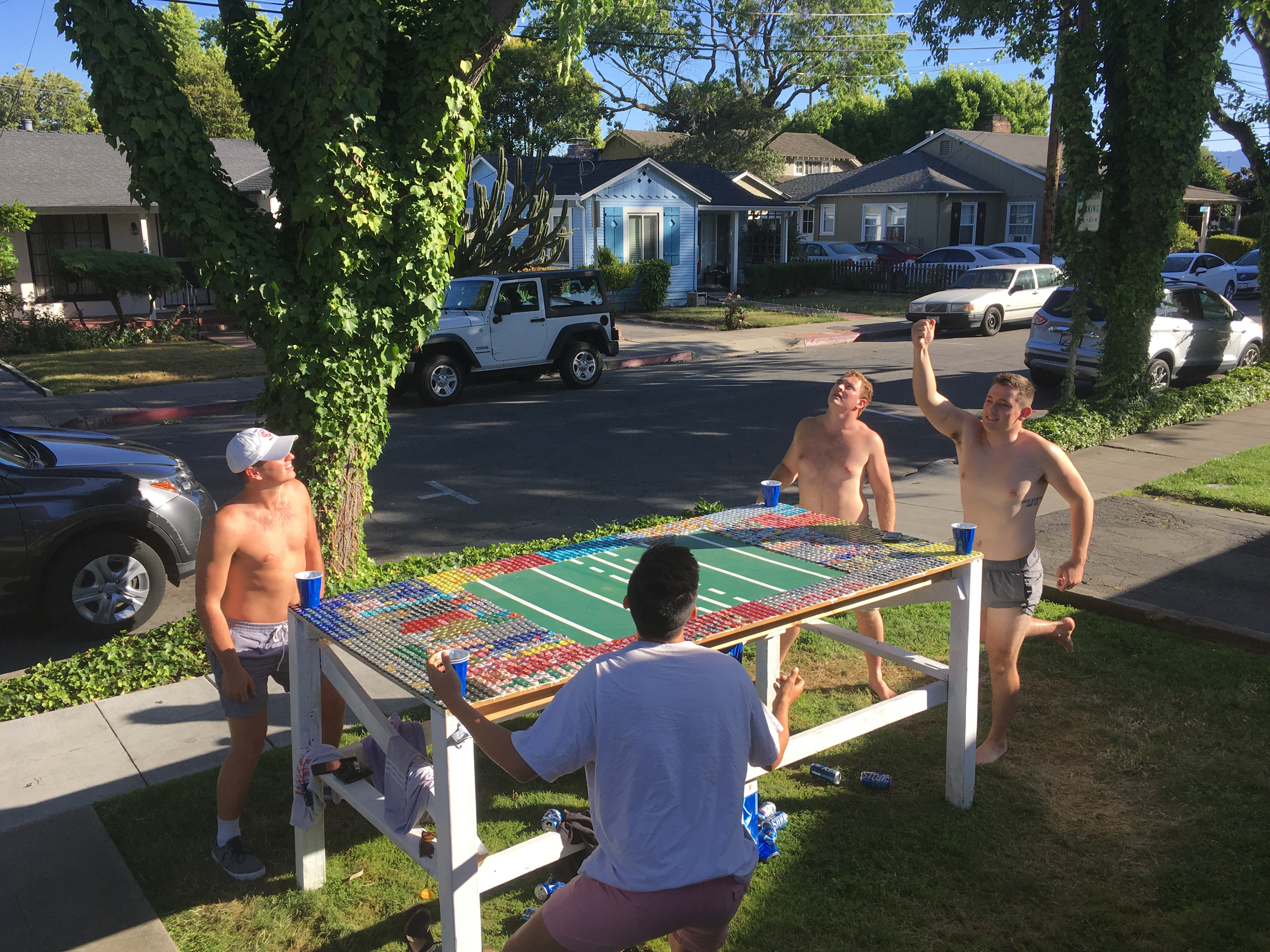
- Other names: Snappa
- Players: Two vs. two
- Skills: accuracy, hand–eye coordination, reaction time
- Materials required: Plywood table, pint glasses or solo cups, dice
- Alcohol used: Beer

Beer die, or snappa is a table-based drinking game in which opposing players sit or stand at opposite ends and throw a die over a certain height with the goal of either landing the die in their opponent's cup or having the die hit the table and bounce over the scoring area to the floor. The defending team attempts to catch the die one-handed after it hits the table, but before it touches a non-table surface. The game typically consists of two two-player teams with each of the four players having a designated cup on the table, but can also be played one-vs-one.

== Basic rules ==
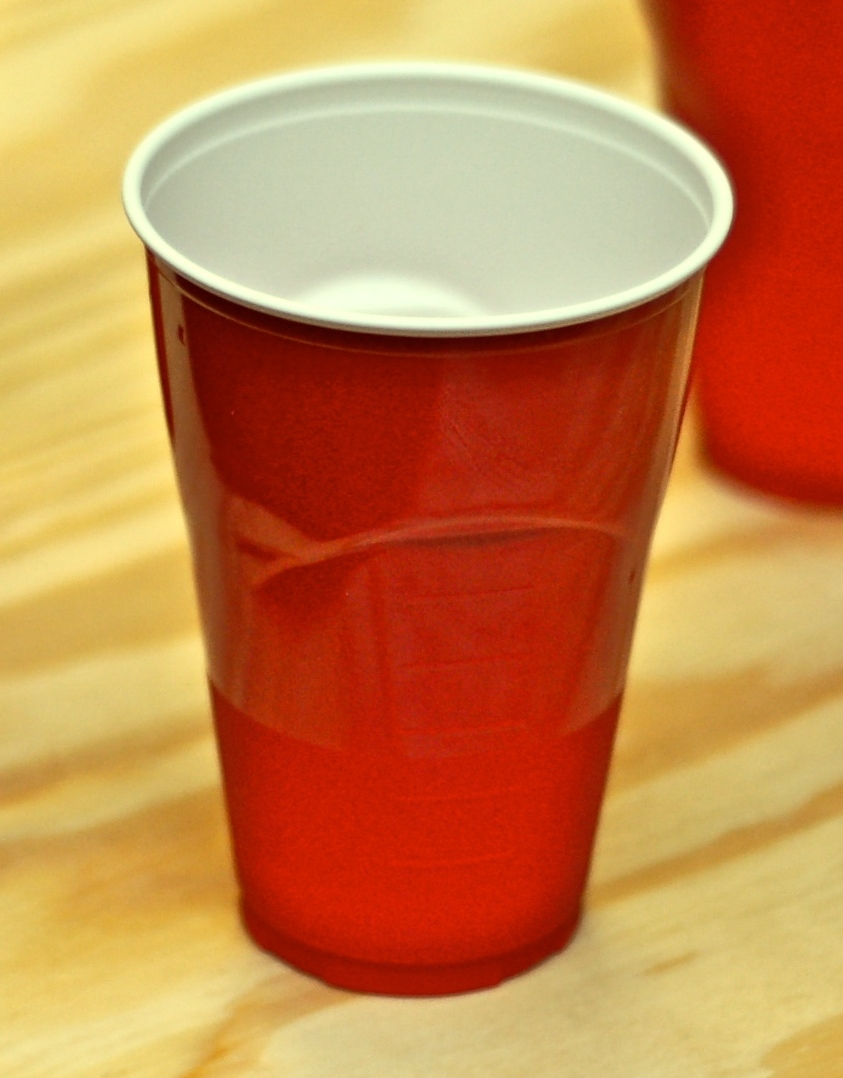
A Solo cup

The Beer Die League website specified the following rules for the game in February 2014, based on a crowdsourced project and research into the history of the game:

- It is played on a standard sheet of plywood (8 by 4 feet (2.4 by 1.2 m) of at least 1/2 inch (13 mm) thickness) placed on banquet tables, saw horses or similar objects between 20 and 30 inches (510 and 760 mm). The game uses a standard solo cup (4.75 inches (121 mm) height, 3.75 inches (95 mm) diameter). The official dice used for play is the standard Bicycle die, measuring 5/8 inch (16 mm).
- The game is to be played standing up, (sitting down is called Snappa), 2 vs. 2.
- A cup full of water or beer is to be placed 8 inches (200 mm) from the back, 5 inches (130 mm) from the side, for each player (hand from back, fist from side).
- The game is played to a particular end score, such as first to five, seven, eleven, or twelve points (win by 2, cap at seven)
- The number 5 must be referred to as bizz, the number 7 must be referred to as buzz.
- One player from each team will roll the die, the team rolling the highest number will be able to choose either side or first toss.
- Players must tap the die before tossing to signal the impending throw.
- The die must be thrown in such a manner that the opposing team does not see the thrower's palm upon release of the die.
- The die must travel higher than 8 feet (2.4 m) from the ground. If the opposing team disputes the height, the shot does not count.
- A point is awarded if the die hits the table and bounces off the defensive (4 feet (1.2 m)) side of the table without being properly caught.
- The defending team may catch the die to nullify potential points scored. The die must be caught with one hand (juggling is permitted) but must not be trapped between any surface or body part or a point is awarded. Once the die comes in contact with the floor or stops moving, the play is dead and a point is awarded. Leaving the chair to catch the die is permitted. Players may not reach over the plane of the table to catch the die.
- If the die strikes the cup on a toss, this is a "plink" (also "body" or "ting"): the die is dead and no points can be awarded.
- If the die is thrown into the opposing team’s cup, this is a "plunk", "sink" or "sploosh": the throwing team is awarded one point and the thrower is permitted to sign the table. Each additional plunk is awarded a tally under their name.
- If a team shoots out of turn, the toss is negated and the team loses their next shot.
- A designated "god" referee has a final say in disputes.

=== Drinking ===
When played as a drinking game, players are required to take drinks when certain events occur, or fail to occur. The Beer Die League website specifies that the following rules are used:

- There are five drinks per cup (or "boat").
- All drinks must be completed as a team.
- A player must drink 1/5th of a cup if:
  - They say the word five or seven.
  - Their toss misses the table completely.
  - Their toss stays on the table, without hitting the cup.
  - Their toss hits the ceiling.
  - Their team tosses the die out of turn.
  - The die strikes their cup (plink/body/ting).
- If the die lands in a cup (plunk/sink/sploosh) that team must finish their drinks and roll the die out onto the table. If the die is a "bizz", the team must finish another full drink.

== Snappa ==
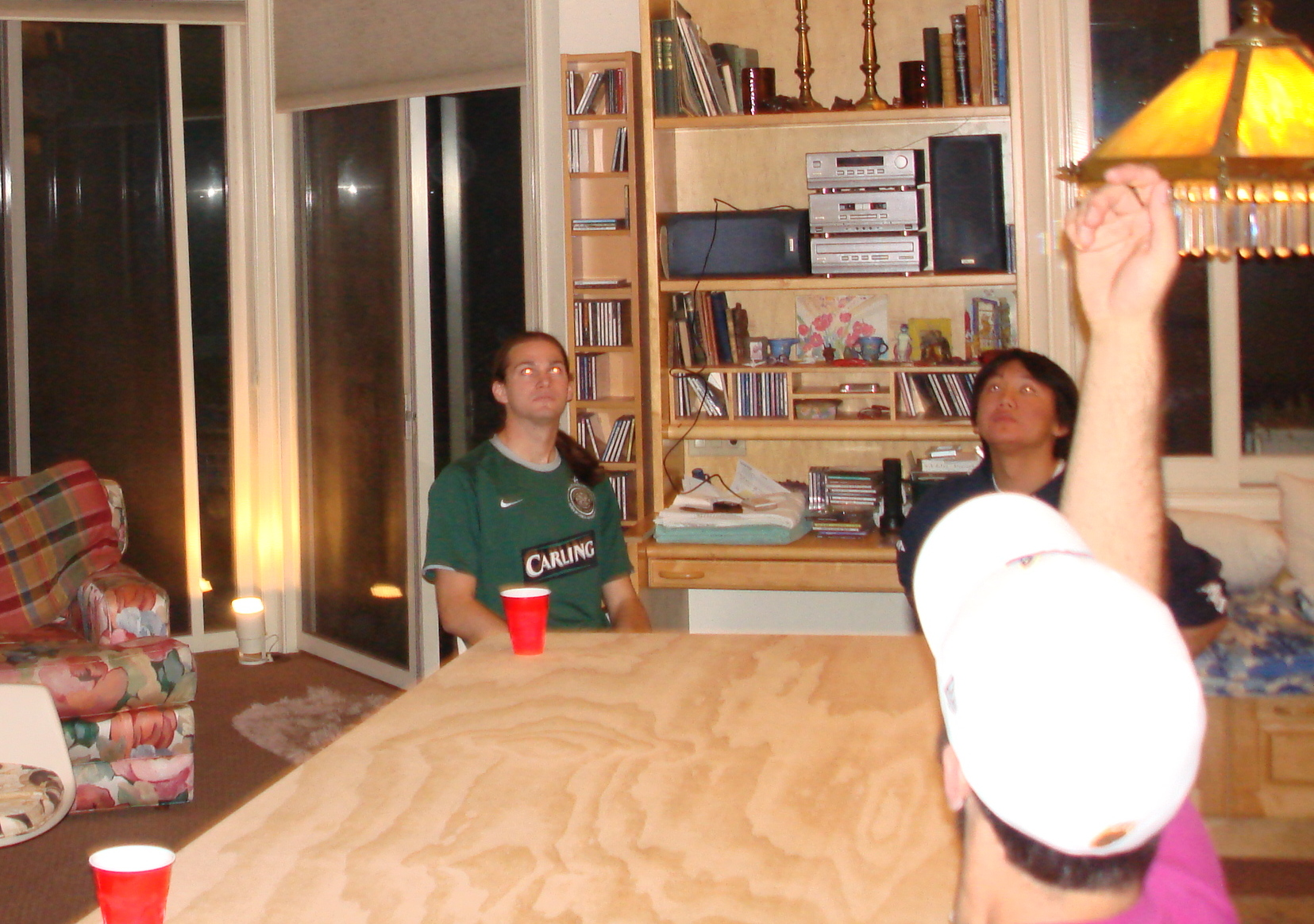
The game played seated, with a cup at each corner of the table

The standing variant of beer die was originally developed from the drinking game Snappa. The variant known as Snappa is played seated, with a chair at each corner of the table.

=== Other variants ===
- Players may be required to take all drinks with their left hand.

== See also ==
- List of drinking games
