= La vache qui tache =

Party game

La vache qui tache (English: "the cow that stains") is a party game that originated in France. The only prop required is a cork, one end of which has been blackened by a candle flame.

Assign each player a number. Player one calls out "Je suis la vache qui tache sans taches numéro 1 et j'appelle la vache sans taches numéro X" ("I am the cow who spots with zero spots number 1, and I call the cow with zero spots number X"), where X is the number of any other player. When the game first starts no-one has any spots, so the number of spots is zero, or "sans tache". The next player, X, must immediately repeat the phrase, using his/her own number and another player for X ("I am the spotted cow with zero spots number X, and I call the cow with zero spots number Y"), where Y is the number of any other player. The game repeats this way until someone makes a mistake.

If a player makes a mistake, like mixing up the cow numbers, taking too long to respond, or calling the wrong number of spots, that player gets "spotted", using the blackened cork to make a big round black dot on their face. If a player gets one spot, then that player must say "I am the spotted cow with one spot..." and so on for the number of spots received.

Each mistake earns a player another spot, and both the player's number of spots and the number of spots of the player called must be taken into account every time a player is called. The game may continue indefinitely or end when someone gets a certain number of spots.

== Ibble Dibble ==
Ibble Dibble, or Ripple Tipple in Australasia, is an English variant. It also involves marking people's faces with a blackened cork or a similar substance such as peanut butter.

Ibble Dibble is similar, with one variant using the name of the person instead of a number. For example: "I am Ibble Dibble Kyle with no Dibble Ibbles calling Ibble Dibble Kate with one Dibble Ibble." Another variant is referring to "spots," saying "I'm number one spot, I've got no spots, how many spots has number X spot got?".

== Commercialisation ==
In 2004 la vache qui tache was made into a commercial party game, distributed by Jeux F.K.
