= Sevens, elevens, and doubles =

Drinking game played with dice

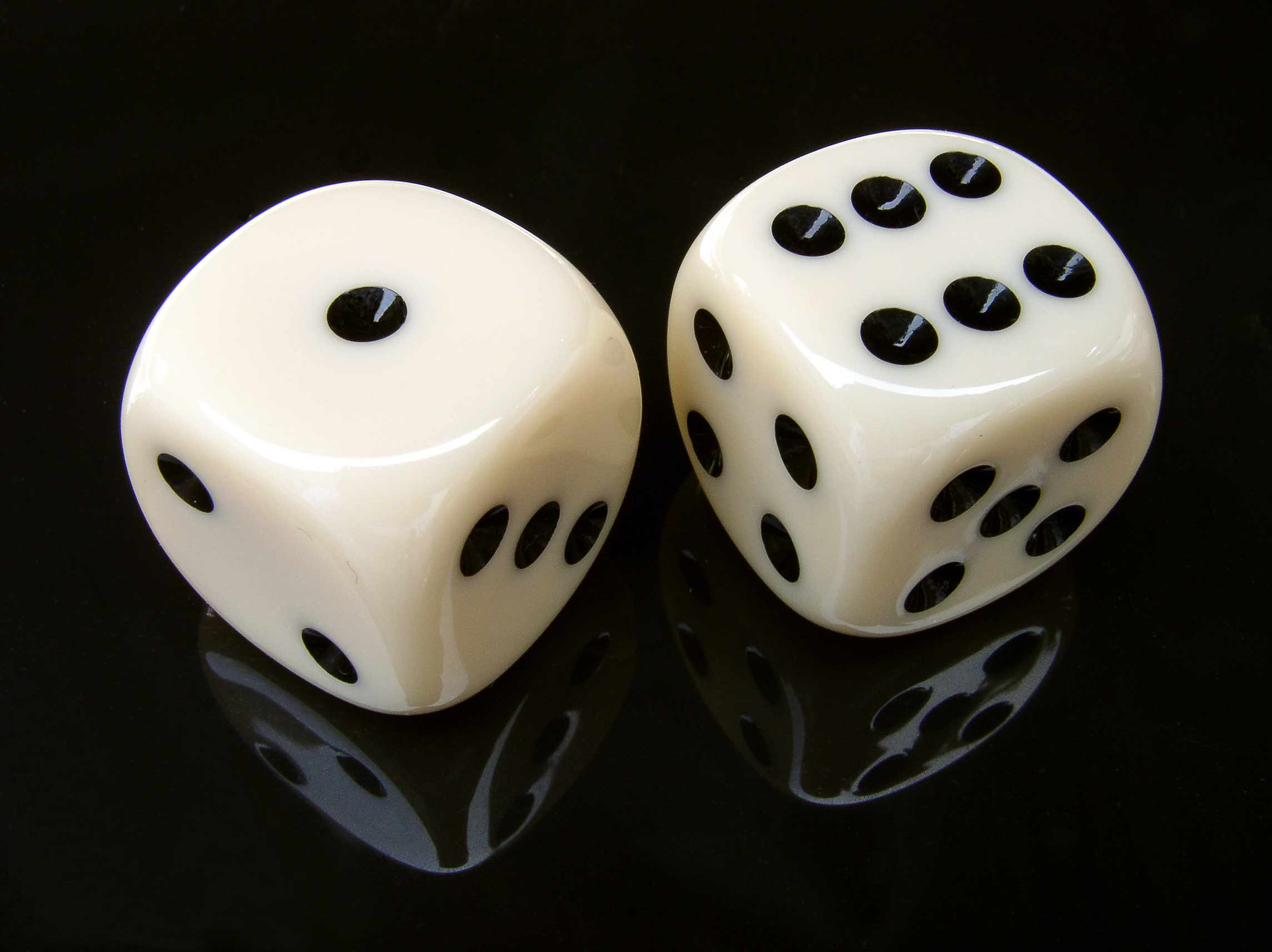
- When a player rolls a 7, they choose a player who must drink
- Publishers: Arthur Luu
- Genres: Drinking
- Players: 2+

Sevens, elevens, and doubles (also referred to as 7/11/2x, sloppy dice or hero) is a drinking game played with two dice. The game can be played with as few as two people, but is usually played in a group of five or more. The object of the games is to roll a 7, 11 or any double. To win the game: remain the last drinker.

== Rules ==
The players place a glass of alcohol in the middle of the table. The first player throws the dice. If they roll a 7, an 11 or a double, the roller chooses a player to drink. If the roll is none of those, then the roller passes the dice to the left. Once a player rolls a 7, 11 or a double, they choose a player to drink. The player chosen to drink must consume everything in the center glass before the roller is able to roll another 7, 11 or a double. If they are successful in rolling before the glass is empty, the glass is refilled and the drinker tries again until successful. If the roller touches the dice before the drinker touches the cup, their roles are reversed. At any point, another player ("the rescuer") may "save" the drinker by taking the glass and drinking it.
