= Bung =

Bung may refer to:

- Bung (apparatus), a container closure
- Bung (offal), the large intestine eaten as food
- Bung, Nepal, a village development committee in Nepal
- Bung, British slang for a bribe
- Bung, usually spelt "boong", an Australian racial slur used against Aboriginal Australians
- Bung, a word used in Australia to mean dead or inoperative
- Bung Enterprises, a defunct Hong Kong–based manufacturer of video game accessories
- Bung language, a nearly extinct language of Cameroon
- Bung Tomo (1920–1981), an Indonesian military leader

== See also ==
- Bung Bong, a place in Victoria, Australia
- Bunger (disambiguation)
- Bunghole, a hole bored in a liquid-tight barrel
- Laboratory rubber stopper
