= Kings (card game) =

Drinking game

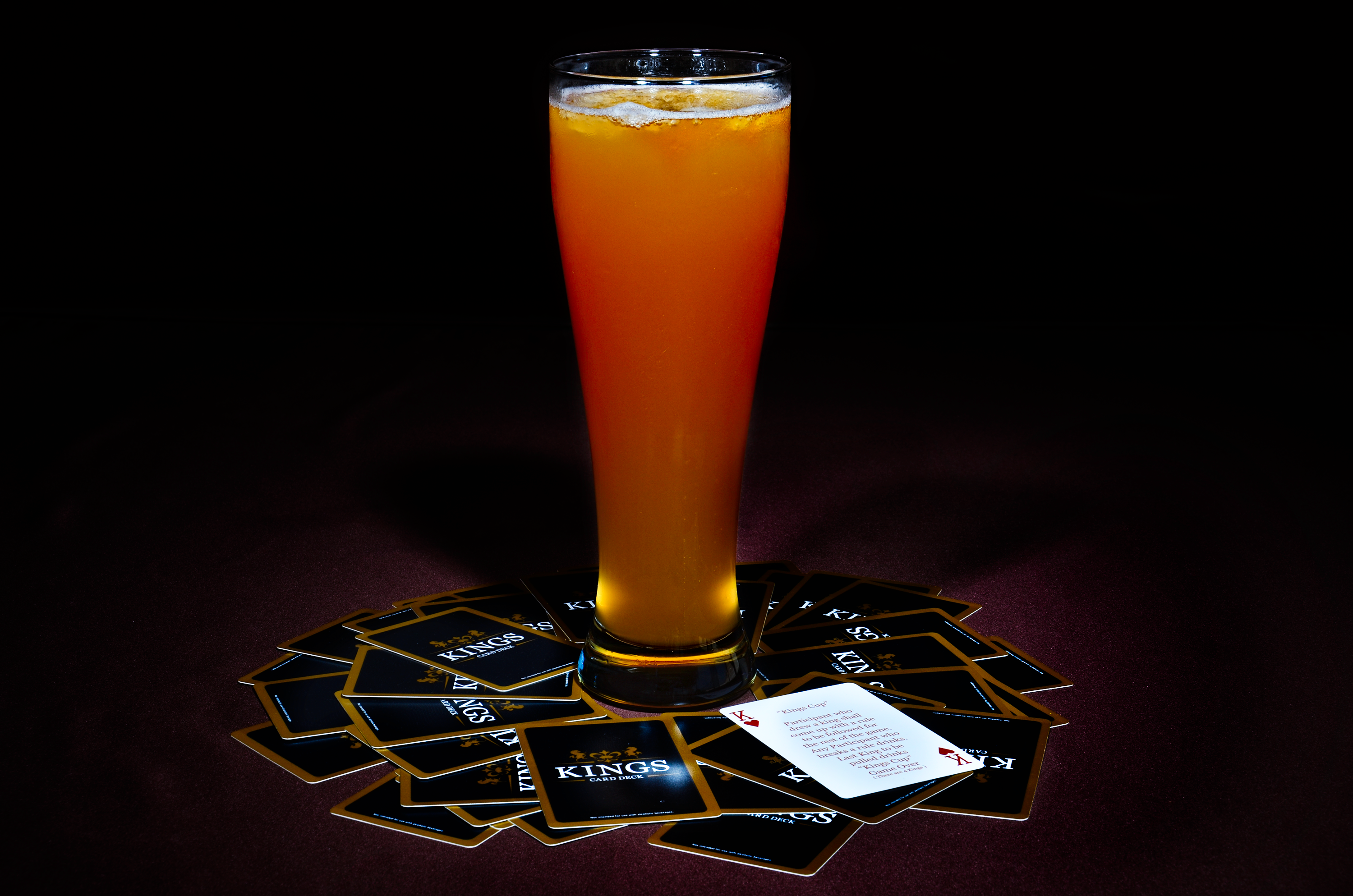
- Cards during a game of Kings
- Alternative names: King's cup Donut; Circle of death Ring of Fire; Four Kings
- Type: Drinking
- Players: 2+
- Age range: Varies by legal jurisdiction
- Cards: 52
- Deck: 1 deck of standard playing cards
- Rank (high→low): A K Q J 10 9 8 7 6 5 4 3 2
- Play: Clockwise or counterclockwise
- Playing time: 20 to 40 minutes

Kings (also known as king's cup, donut, circle of death or ring of fire) is a drinking game using playing cards. Players must drink and dispense drinks based on cards drawn. The cards have predetermined drink rules prior to the game's beginning. Often groups establish house rules with their own game variations.

== Equipment ==
- A deck of playing cards
- Alcoholic beverages (typically wine, beer, or mixed drinks) or non alcoholic beverages
- A large cup which will be used as the King's Cup, or (in the "Ring of Fire" version of the game) an unopened beer can

== Setup and common rules ==
In this game, a deck of cards is shuffled and dealt into a circle around either an empty cup or a full drink of choice. Each card value is assigned an action, which is then performed by the relevant players upon it being drawn. Players then take turns drawing cards and participating in the activity assigned by the card dealt.

This game is open-ended and all of the cards can signify any mini-game, the rules and the card assignments are normally confirmed at the beginning of the game. Depending on house rules, the game either ends when the last rule card has been pulled or the king's cup has been consumed. In variations where cards are placed on top of the king's cup, the game is over when the cards fall off, with the player responsible for knocking them off having to consume the king's cup.

Players also often make up and agree on a set of rules every time the game is played. Some common assignments for card values include:

Card drawn	Title	Instruction
Ace	Waterfall	To perform a waterfall, all players start drinking their beverage at the same time. No player can stop drinking until the player to their left stops. (In some versions, the person who draws the card says "waterfall sucks", and each person takes a sip in order to represent performing the "waterfall". This is due to safety concerns about drinking games.)
2	Two for you / Two is you	The player who drew the card gives out two drinks, either both to the same person or one to two different people.
3	Three for me / Three is me	The player who drew the card takes a drink.
4	Four is Whores	All women playing take a drink. (In some versions, this is under the number 6)
4	Hit the Floor / Floor	The last person to touch the floor with their hands must take a drink. (In some versions, this is one hand. In other versions, this is both hands.)
5	Thumb Master	When the thumb master puts their thumb on the table, everyone must follow, and whoever is last must drink. The person who draws the five is the thumb master till someone else draws a five.
5	Five is Guys	All men playing take a drink. (In some versions this is under the number 6)
6	Six is dicks	All men playing take a drink. (In some versions this is under the number 5)
6	Six is chicks	All women playing take a drink. (In some versions this is under the number 4)
7	Heaven / 7th Heaven	The last person to raise their hand must drink.
8	"mate" (i.e. friend) drinks	
9	Rhyme Time / Nine is Rhyme	The player who drew the card says a word, with players going clockwise each saying a word that rhyme with the original. The first person to fail to come up with a rhyming word that has not been used must drink.
10	Categories	The player who drew the card chooses a category, with players going clockwise to name things that fall within the category. The first person to fail to come up with something that has not been said must drink.
Jack	Make a Rule	The player who drew the card can make up any rule that everyone has to follow, such as a requirement to only drink with your left hand. Everyone (including the person who made the rule) must follow this rule for the whole game, and if anyone disobeys, they must drink.
Jack	Social	Everyone must take a drink.
Jack	Never Have I Ever	Starting with the player who drew the card, everyone goes around the circle and saying "never have I ever ___." Whoever has done the action must drink.
Queen	Questions	The player who drew the card starts by asking anyone a question. This player then asks anyone else a question. The first player who fails to ask a question must drink.
Queen	Questions	The player who drew the card becomes the question master. Whenever they ask a question, other players must also respond with questions or otherwise drink. This continues until another Queen is drawn, at which point that player becomes the question master.
King	King's Cup (+ Rules)	When each of the first 3 Kings are drawn, the person who drew the card puts some of their drink into the King's Cup at the center of the table. When the 4th King is drawn, the person who drew the 4th King must drink the contents of the King's Cup. In some variations, the first three people to pick a King card can also make a rule that must be followed until the next King is picked. Some common rules include Buffalo (must always use left hand), Thumbs (player puts their thumb on the table silently, last person to follow suit drinks), Drink Drank Drunk (no one can say any version of the word "drink"), In bed (everyone has to say "in bed" after every sentence), and Teeth (players can not show their teeth when they laugh).

== Ring of Fire ==
In the "Ring of Fire" version of the game, a can of beer (or other alcoholic beverage) is placed in the center of the ring of cards. Players "discard" cards by sliding them under the beer tab. The player who pops the beer tab must drink the whole can. That signals the end of the round, and another can is placed in the middle to continue the game.

If by drawing a card a player creates a gap in the circle of cards, they must finish their own drink.

== Variations and other rules ==
Like most other drinking games, Kings has endless variations of rules, and individual drinking groups usually have their own set of card effects. There will be similar rules, but there will most likely always be some that some players have never encountered before. Some games specify that playing a certain card allows that player to make up a new rule which lasts for the remainder of the game.

A major variation in the US, UK, Ireland, Australia, New Zealand, South Africa or Canada is that the contents of the King's Cup are drunk by the player who breaks the circle of cards (known as the Ring of Fire in the UK).

A popular variation in Australia is the Smoko or Toilet Card replacing Give Two Take Two. In this version, a player needs to possess a Smoko Card to leave the table to smoke or to use the toilet. A player can have multiple copies of the card and they can be traded, typically under conditions such as; the recipient must refill drinks on demand, crawl for the rest of the game, talk in a funny voice, etc.

When drinking from bottles of beer, the discard can be placed on top of the beer with two corners of each card hanging off the edge. As this continues, it will begin to resemble a mushroom. Similar to the game Jenga, if the mushroom collapses, the person who last placed their card or was attempting to do so must drink the entire bottle. If all cards are successfully discarded without the mushroom collapsing, the last person to discard drinks the bottle, and others finish their drinks.

In Belgium the game is known as "Circle of Destruction" or "Hardcore Kings". In the beginning a pint is placed in the middle of the circle and everyone has to pour some of their drink in it, from now on this drink is referred to as "Witch's Brew".

Card drawn	Title	Instruction
Ace	Safe	Everyone drinks but you.
2	Who	A round of spin the bottle is played.
3	Wanna fight me?	A match of arm wrestling is played with the player sitting on the opposite side of the circle, the loser drinks. A slap contest can also be played.
4	We're whores	Everyone has to take off one piece of clothing as fast as they can, last on to do so has to drink.
5	My life	You have to take a sip from every player's drink.
6	...tynine	The player who had sex the most recently drinks, the second time this card is drawn the player who had sex the second most recently drinks and so on...
7	Close to heaven	Do a body shot out of the belly button of your left-hand neighbour.
8	Mate	Choose a person to be your mate and they drink when you drink, and vice versa, for the rest of the game. If one of the mates draws another 8 card they chose another player and now all three have to drink. You can also merge two mated pairs this way. If all players of the game become mated, then all ties are cancelled.
9	Time to shine	You have to do 20 push ups, if you can't do it you have to drink the amount of sips you were short of 20.
10	Witch	You have to down the witch's brew. Afterwards the pint is refilled.
Jack	The Jack entertains	You have to do a credible and serious belly dance, for every minute you can pull this off you may choose another player who had to down their drink.
Queen	Mixer	Every player has to hand in his drink and you may reassign them to different players.
King	Rewind Time	You can use your rewind power one time to let someone do their assignment again.

== See also ==
- List of drinking games
