= Patruni e sutta =

Patruni e sutta (pro: /pa'truniesutta/) (in English: Master and slave) is an Italian drinking card game (usually practiced with wine or beer) spread in Calabria, Sicily and province of Taranto. It can use Italian cards, sicilian cards and French cards with 4,6 or 8 people in 2 teams. The aim of the game is to drink as much as possible and pay as little as possible.

The first stage of the game is to play a briscola. Who lost pay beer or wine In the second stage, it wraps the cards and give to every player a 4 cards. The player that have highest primiera called "patruni" (the master), who has the second best score is "u sutta" (the slave).

Table for calculating primiera:

Valore card	7	6	Ace	5	4	3	2	King	Queen	jack
Primiera value	21	18	16	15	14	13	12	10	10	10

Now The sutta prepare u number of glass and fill it with the beer/wine. "U sutta" propose a player will have to drink to the "Patruni", Who can answer positively or negatively. If the Patruni and the sutta are in the same team offer the glasses to the members of their team. If not, they have to looking for a compromise. When the glasses prepared by the sutta are finished restart the game from the briscola.

== Variants ==
There are many variants of the game that do not use briscola or primiera to decide who are the master and the slave but using king, queen and jack card. Who own jack is the "sutta, who own queen is the "master", who has the king is the "hide" master, he do not reveal is card, and knocking the table he can take the drink offered to another player, and after proving he has the king card.
