= Baik Bong =

North Korean author

- Hangul: 백봉
- Hanja: 白峰
- RR: Baek Bong
- MR: Paek Pong

Baik Bong (Korean: 백봉) is a North Korean author known for writing the official biography of Kim Il Sung.

== Biography of Kim Il Sung ==
The first comprehensive biography of Kim Il Sung was published in Korean in North Korea in 1968. It was called Minjogŭi t'aeyang Kim Il-sŏng changgun (Sun of the People, General Kim Il Sung). Although it was most likely written by a collective, it appeared under the name of Baik Bong. Before that, hagiography of Kim Il Sung had been identified with Han Sorya, but after he was purged, hagiography conventionally no longer appeared under the name of any one author. Baik's biography was published by the party in two volumes. It covered Kim Il Sung's life up to the end of 1967. That biography was translated into English in three volumes under the title Kim Il Sung Biography and was published by a Japanese publishing house. The first volume is titled From Birth to Triumphant Return to Homeland, the second volume From Building Democratic Korea to Chullima Flight, and the third volume From Independent National Economy to 10-Point Political Programme. It has since become "the standard DPRK biography" of Kim Il Sung. In 1970, the three volumes were published in French by the Jeune Afrique Edition publishing house in Paris.

A new version of Baik's biography was published in August 1972 as Ilyu haebang ŭi kusŏng Kim Il-sŏng wŏnsu (Marshal Kim Il Sung, Liberator of Mankind), prompted by the fact that the nascent Juche ideology had now been attributed to Kim Il Sung from his youth, which had to be written into the story. During the 1970s, Pyongyang intensified its massive campaign to publish the works and feats of Kim Il Sung in several languages in order to promote its Juche ideology throughout the world (and in the Third World in particular).

=== Factual accuracy ===
Baik devoted much of his work in the official biography to recount Kim Il Sung's struggle against the Japanese occupiers. The factual accuracy of many such anti-Japanese tales has been questioned. Baik also omits any mention of Kim Il Sung's association with the Northeastern People's Revolutionary Army. It has also been suggested that "Baik Bong" is a pseudonym and that the writer lives in Japan.

== Works ==
- Baik Bong (1968). Minjogŭi t'aeyang Kim Il-sŏng changgun [Sun of the People, General Kim Il Sung] (in Korean). Vol. 1. Pyongyang: Inmunkwahaksa.
- — (1969). Minjogŭi t'aeyang Kim Il-sŏng changgun [Sun of the People, General Kim Il Sung] (in Korean). Vol. 2. Pyongyang: Inmunkwahaksa.
- — (1969). Kim Il Sung Biography: From Birth to Triumphant Return to Homeland. Vol. 1. Tokyo: Miraisha. OCLC 956015711.
- — (1970). Kim Il Sung Biography: From Building Democratic Korea to Chullima Flight. Vol. 2. Tokyo: Miraisha. OCLC 630184658.
- — (1970). Kim Il Sung Biography: From Independent National Economy to 10-Point Political Programme. Vol. 3. Tokyo: Miraisha. OCLC 416522022.
- — (1972). Ilyu haebang ŭi kusŏng Kim Il-sŏng wŏnsu [Marshal Kim Il Sung, Liberator of Mankind] (in Korean). Tokyo: Inmun kwahaksa.
- O Tae-sok; Baik Bong; Yi Sang-gyu (1980). The Benevolent Sun: Mt. Paekdu-San Tells. Vol. 1. Pyongyang: Foreign Languages Publishing House. OCLC 931646653.
- —; Baik Bong; Yi Sang-gyu (1982). The Benevolent Sun: A New Legend of Chollima Korea. Vol. 2. Pyongyang: Foreign Languages Publishing House. OCLC 63132601.
- —; Baik Bong; Yi Sang-gyu (1986). The Benevolent Sun: The Sunrays of Juche Spread over the World. Vol. 3. Pyongyang: Foreign Languages Publishing House. OCLC 86018904.
- —; Baik Bong; Yi Sang-gyu (1992). The Benevolent Sun: Towards the Complete Victory of Socialism. Vol. 4. Pyongyang: Foreign Languages Publishing House. OCLC 85917433.
