= Beer checkers =

Drinking game

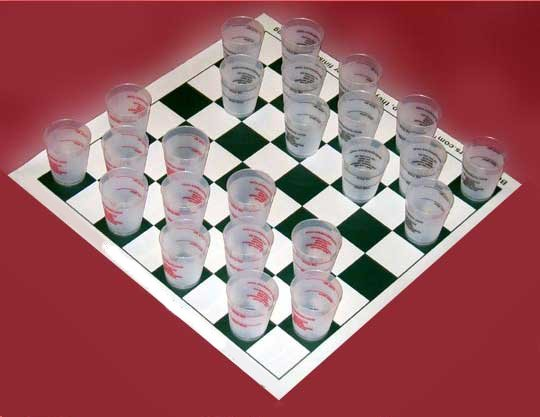
A Beer Checkers board

Beer checkers (also known as shotglass checkers, shot glass checkers or beercheckers) is a two player drinking game. A variant of normal checkers (or draughts), it is played on a standard checkerboard (or chess board), using shot glasses of beer in place of the regular playing pieces. The game is popular with students at universities in the United States.

== Play ==
The board is set up as for a normal game of checkers, with 24 glasses to a side, each cup half-full of beer. Either the glasses should be visually distinct to distinguish the players' pieces, or a light and a dark beer should be used for each player.

The game is played by the standard rule for English draughts. When a piece reaches the king's row, it is designated as a king by filling the glass full. When a piece is jumped by an opposing player, the owner of the piece must drink the beer from the jumped piece.

The game is won by a player when the other play cannot move their piece, either because all the remaining pieces are blocked, or because the player has no remaining pieces. The losing player must drink all remaining beers on the board.

== In popular culture ==
A pivotal scene in Graham Greene's 1958 novel Our Man in Havana sees the protagonist playing a game of draughts using miniature bottles of scotch and bourbon. In the 1937 film Love Is News, Tyrone Power plays beer checkers with his fellow newspaper reporters. In the 1972 film The Grand Duel, a game of beer checkers using liquor is played between Bighorse (Jess Hahn) and the stationmaster as they were spending the night at Silver Bells. They are not able to finish the game as they both eventually fall unconscious.

== Sources ==
- Nanette Stone. Checkers // Boozter Shots Fun Drinking Games!. — New York: Peter Pauper Press, 2004. — P. 51. — ISBN 0-88088463-0, ISBN 978-0-88088463-1

== See also ==
- List of drinking games
- Australian Draughts Federation
