= Schweinchen =

Card game

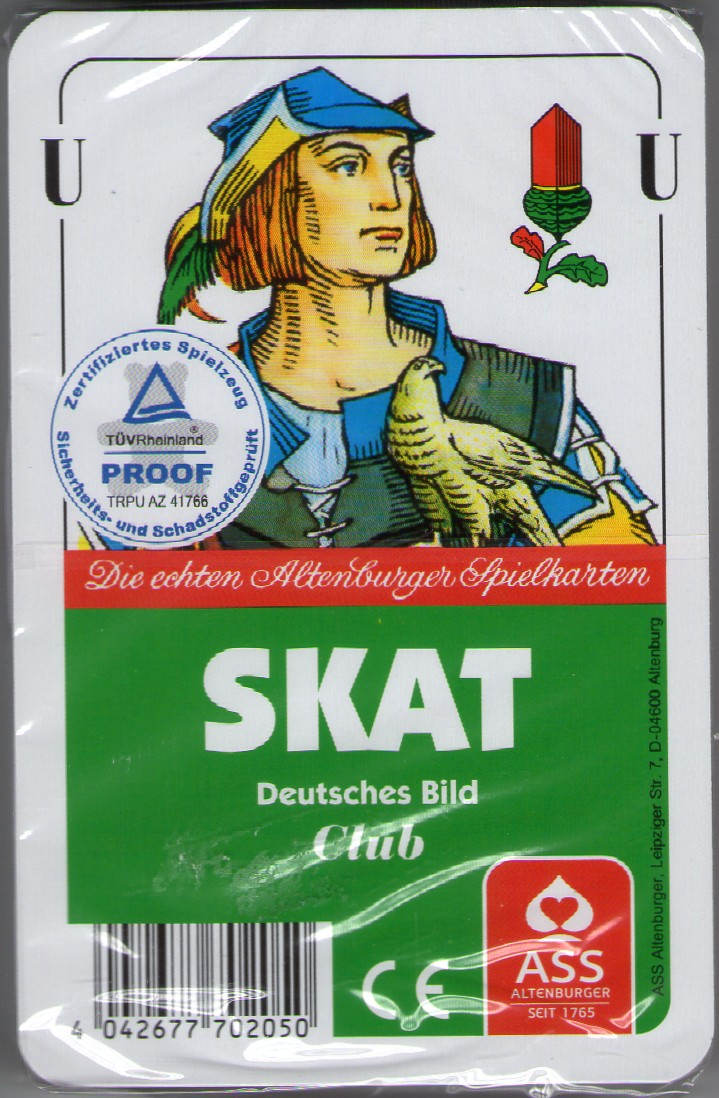
- German deck
- Origin: Germany
- Type: Shedding card game
- Players: 3 to 6
- Cards: 5 per player
- Deck: French or German
- Play: Counter-clockwise
- Playing time: 5 minutes

Schweinchen ("piglet" or "piggy") is a really fast card game for 3 to 6 players, the aim of which is to shed one's cards as quickly as possible. It originates from Germany and is suitable for children.

== Cards ==
It may be played with either a French or Altenburg deck of 32 cards, from which a quartet of cards is drawn for each player and then a random card from those left.

== Play ==
At the start each player is dealt 4 cards, except the dealer, who gets five. The remaining cards are placed face down on the table to form the talon or stock.

Each player now attempts to collect four cards of the same value, e.g. four 7s or four 9s. The dealer starts by giving a card that he cannot use to the player on his right, without showing the other players. The receiving player now chooses a card from his hand of five and passes it to the player on his right and so on. If a card goes around the table and back to the player who first had it, he may place it in a discard pile next to the talon and draw the top card from the talon.

When a player gets the fourth card needed to make up the set, he quickly throws the cards onto the table and calls loudly "Piggy!" (Schweinchen!). The other players do the same and the one who is the last to throw his cards on the table, loses the game.

In a variant, when a player completes his quartet, he places his cards down as secretly as possible and places a finger on his nose. As soon as the other players notice, they do the same as quickly as possible. The last person with a finger on his nose has lost and as a penalty or forfeit they must grunt like a piglet.

== Penalty ==
Traditionally, the winner shuffles the cards until the loser calls "stop" or and chooses a preferred card, e.g. King of Spades. He also selects whether the cards are to be counted from the top or from the bottom until the card that the "loser" had chosen appears.

For example, if the King of Spades is the sixteenth card from the top or bottom, the "loser" is scratched sixteen times with the number of sixteen obliquely placed cards over the protruding bones of the back of the fist.

== Variants ==
=== Fingerpratzeln ===
In Austria, a variant called Fingerpratzeln ("Finger Claw", in the regions of Flachgau and Tennengau) or Kuhschwanzeln ("Cow's Tail"; in Rußbach) is played which uses a 36-card William Tell pack. The first player to collect four cards of the same suit places his hand on the table and is the winner. The others must immediately do the same; the last one to do so is the loser.

=== Schlafmütze ===
In another variant, the loser has to wear a nightcap (Schlafmütze) for the duration of the next game.

== Literature ==
- Mala, Matthias (2004). Das grosse Buch der Kartenspiele (in German). München. ISBN 978-3-8094-1575-6. OCLC 76578104.
