= Pyramid (drinking game) =

Drinking game played with playing cards

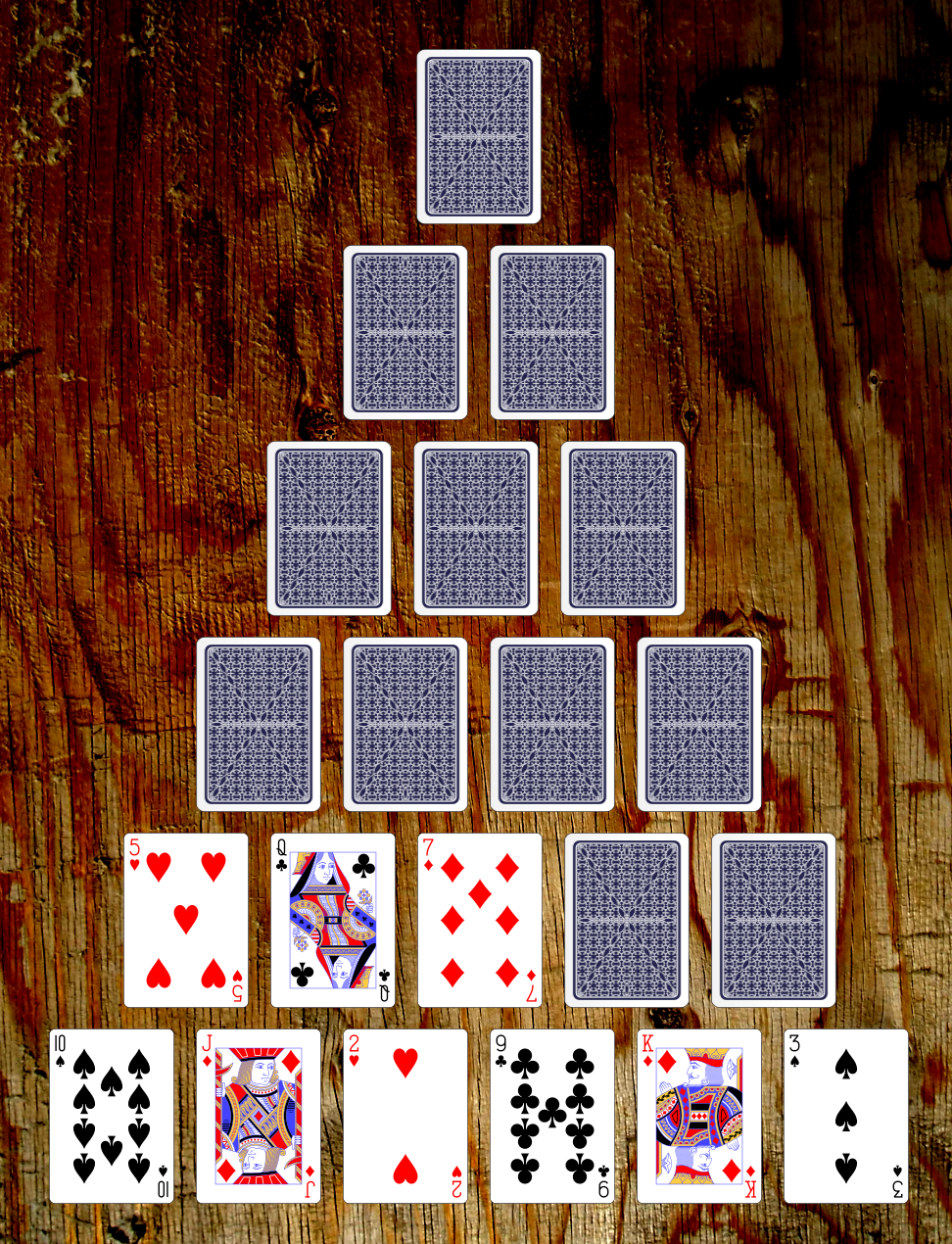
- Cards are laid out in a pyramid shape, starting face-down and being turned over one by one
- Type: Drinking
- Players: 3-7
- Cards: 52
- Deck: Anglo-American
- Playing time: 10 minutes

Related games
- Ride the bus

Pyramid is a drinking game played with a standard deck of playing cards.

== Set up ==
One begins by creating a pyramid of cards by placing them face down on the table in rows (6 cards on the bottom row, 5 on the next, then 4, 3, 2, and 1 card peak on the top row). Next, the dealer passes out three cards to each player, face down. Players can look at their cards only once and should not let other players see them.

== Object ==
The object of the game is to make other players drink based on what cards that they think you have.

== Game play ==
- Turn over the bottom, left card.
- If a player wishes, they may tell another player to drink a sip if they have a card with the same face value in their hand and place it on the card that is flipped over.
- Alternatively, the player may "bluff" and pretend to have the card in question. The player told to drink can either take the designated drink(s) or call the bluff. If a player's bluff is called, that player must drink double the designated drinks. If the player was not bluffing, the player originally told to drink now has to drink double the designated drinks. A player who is forced to show his/her cards is entitled to exchange the used card for a new card from the deck.
- Turn over the next card in the row.
- After the bottom row is all flipped, continue on the next row.
- The number of drinks corresponds to the row in which that card was flipped. For example, if the card is in the third row, one must play with three drinks).
- To add more action to the game, players may be asked to lie their cards face down and remember them. If someone says the player is bluffing, the player has to find his card - taking out the wrong card results in a penalty where the player must drink twice the amount he would otherwise have dealt. Finally, when the pyramid is over, players take turns in memorizing their deck, in the right order. For every card they get wrong, an agreed penalty is dealt.
