= Horserace (drinking game) =

Drinking game played with playing cards

- Initial setup with eight links
- Type: Drinking
- Players: 2+
- Cards: 52
- Deck: Anglo-American
- Playing time: 5 minutes

Horserace is a drinking game using playing cards that is inspired by horse racing. Participants bet amounts of alcohol on one of four aces, much like bettors would bet money on horses at a racing track. The game requires a standard deck of playing cards.

== Preparation ==
The horseracing game requires active participation by only one person: the announcer. The announcer prepares the field by searching through the deck, taking out the ace (horse) of each suit, and laying them face-up and side by side at one end of the table (these are "the gates"). They then shuffle the deck and lay out a variable number of cards face-down (these form the "links" of the race) in a straight line perpendicular to the row of aces. The cards thus appear to form an "L" or the two legs of a right triangle. The field is now set.

== Betting ==
Before the game begins, each player makes bets based on their horse being as simple as "five on diamonds" but can get as complex as any true horse race such as trifectas, exactas, daily doubles, and others. In another variation, players may simply pick their favorite horse, and the payout is set at 20 drinks for the first-place horse, 15 for second place, and 10 for third place. Placing a small bet on the "first horse out of the gates" is a popular bet that excites the crowd early. Penalties may be applied to bettors who bet on an ace that never leaves the starting gates. Safeguards are often instituted to prevent players from placing exorbitant bets such as "one hundred on hearts." Such safeguards may include setting bet limits, requiring players to drink a portion of their bet before the race begins, or forcing losers to drink a portion of their bet at the end.

Variations exist including:

- Winners distribute drinks equal to the amount they bet or double
- Winners become immune to drinking.

== Gameplay ==
Once all bets are in, the announcer begins the race. They flip over the top card of the remaining deck. Only the suit of this card matters; the ace of that suit moves forward to the first link. The announcer narrates the ebb and flow of the game as the betters cheer on their horse. The announcer continues flipping cards and advancing horses accordingly until one horse wins by passing the final link into the winner's circle.

== Variations ==
Another variation is Faltering. Each time a horse moves up to a new link for the first time (and only the first time), the announcer flips over the card on the side of that link. The suit shown on this sideboard card must move back one space (falter). Thus in an eight-link horserace, there are eight instances of faltering that can totally change the outcome of the game. As a rule, any horse in the gates can not be knocked back any further by faltering. Another variation is Stumble in which all horses except the leader move forward one space if a designated wild card is flipped over, such as the Joker.

The Pagat card game website gives a version in which the seven cards in the track are laid out face up and used to determine odds. The more cards of a certain suit in the track, the fewer of that suit are in the deck, so the less likely that horse will come in first. The payout varies according to the odds. There is also a version in which the horses are auctioned off, and the two front runners split the pot.
