= Buffalo (drinking game) =

Drinking game

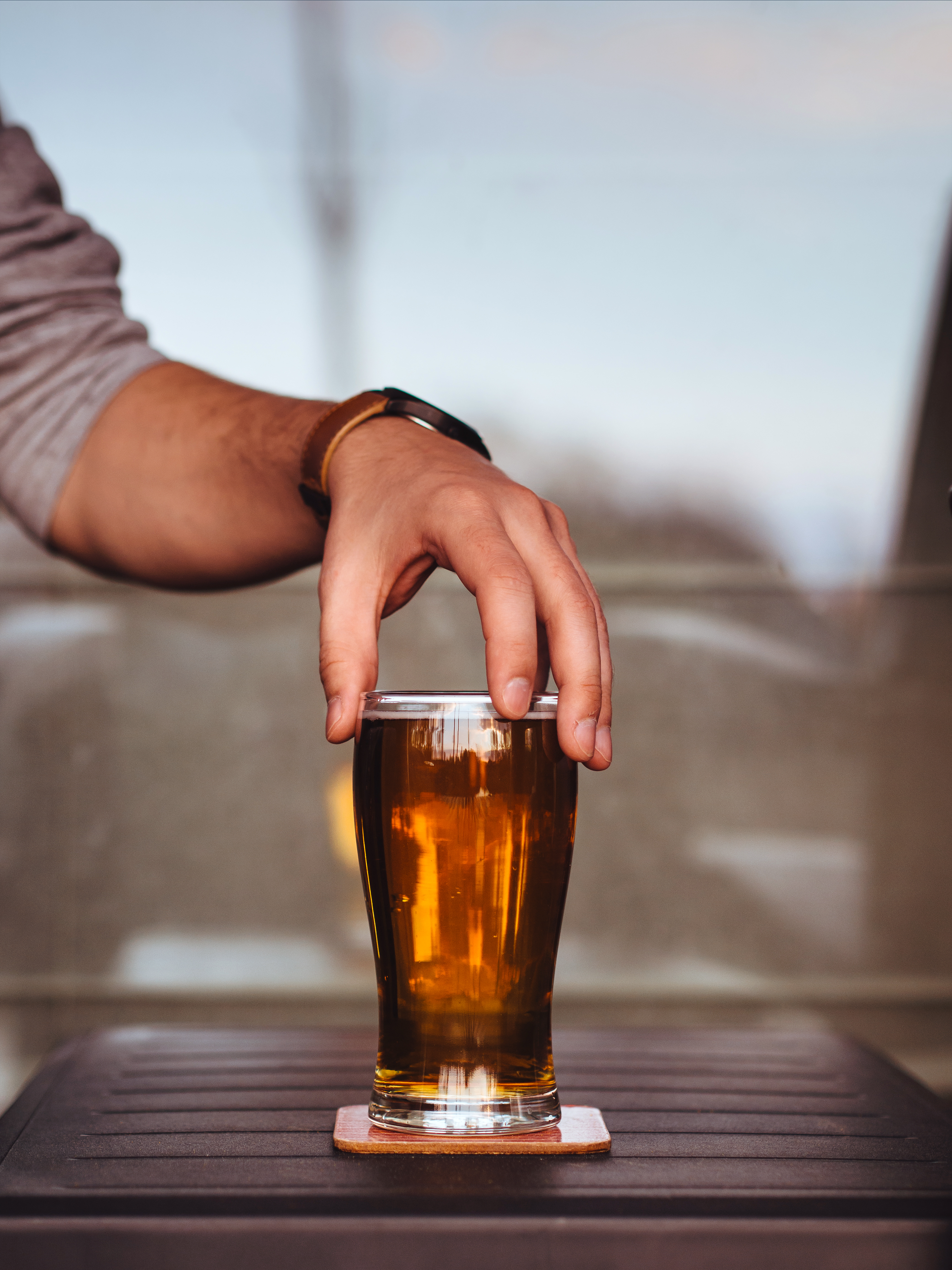
Buffalo is a game of a player remembering to drink with their non-dominant hand

Buffalo (or Buffalo Club) is a drinking game where participants agree to only drink from their glass with their non-dominant hand. If they are caught using the other hand, they must 'chug' or 'skull' (rapidly finish) their drink.

People who play the game refer to themselves as "Buffalos", and groups of players may refer to themselves as a "Buffalo Club" or a “Buffalo Herd”.

== History ==
The history and origin of the Buffalo Club are obscure and many versions are in existence. A folk origin of the game states that Buffalo Club stems from the gunslinging days of the Wild West where the use of one's right hand (the shooting hand) was at times a matter of life or death. Thus, recreational activities such as playing cards or drinking were done with the left hand only to avoid severe consequences. The game is now popular around the world.

== Basic game ==
The basic rule of the game is that a player can only drink with their non-dominant hand. If any other Buffalo players spot them drinking with their dominant hand, they call Buffalo on the player and that player must finish their drink as quickly as possible. If the player hesitates to finish their drink, the other players will usually proceed to make a ruckus chanting "Buffalo!" and banging on the table until the player finishes.

The game is often presented as a "lifetime commitment", where agreeing to play it means that others who know this may call a player out for drinking with the wrong hand at any point in the future.

Alternatively, players may only ever hold their drink in their left hand, even when they are not drinking it. Having everyone use the same hand removes the need for players to ask each other's dominant hand.

There is an alternative version of the game in which the hand used changes every hour. On even hours, any player must drink with their right hand, and on odd hours, with their left hand. This version is particularly widespread in Switzerland.

== See also ==
- The Game (mind game), another game in which the players are perpetually playing.
