= Beer bong =

Drinking device composed of a funnel and attached tube

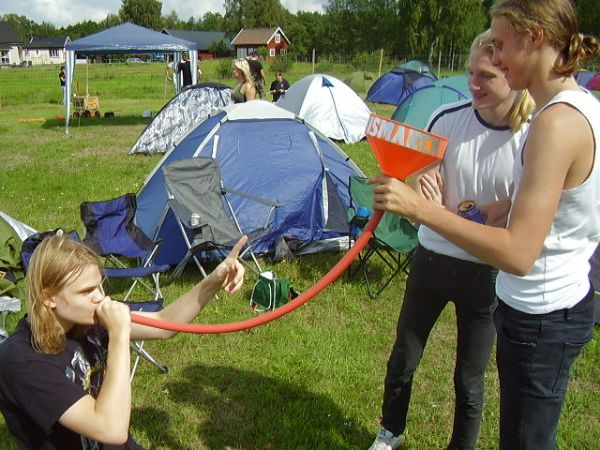
Beer bong

A beer bong is a device consisting of a funnel attached to a tube and used to facilitate the rapid consumption of beer. The use of a beer bong is also known as funneling. A beer bong is unrelated in function to a bong, which is primarily used to consume cannabis.

== Construction ==
The typical construction of a beer bong involves a large funnel connected to tubing. Beer is stockpiled in the funnel and as the user drinks, the beer pours down the tubing. Beer bongs often have valves to engage or disengage the flow of beer.

== Use ==
=== Typical use ===
One person holds a clear pipe to their mouth, while a second holds the other end of the pipe with a large plastic funnel attached. The pipe is part-filled with beer, with the remainder of the pipe and the bottom of the funnel filling with a foamy head.

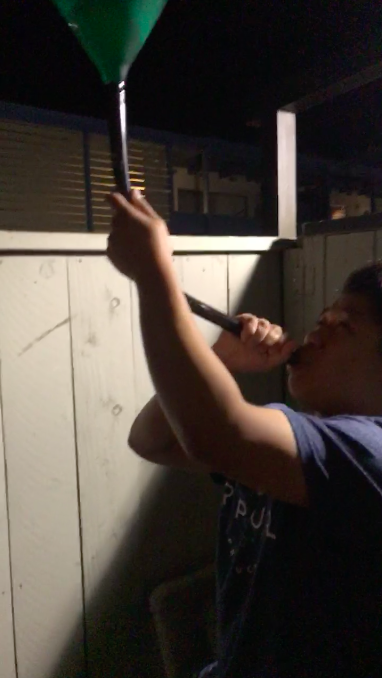

Drinking from a beer bong is different from drinking beer (or other carbonated beverages) normally . This is because the drinker is not in control of the volume of liquid entering the mouth. In addition, the force of gravity pushes the beer into the drinker's mouth and thus 'forces' the beer down. It is for this reason that the beer bong often engages the gag reflex.

The beer bong is either 'hit' or 'chugged'. A hit from the beer bong is when a valve is used and one drinks as much beer as they can before turning off the valve. Chugging is where an entire, or multiple beers, are consumed in one use. A popular technique is to 'open' the esophagus and simply allow the beer to flow down. This takes practice and may cause pain in trying it for the first time.

=== Rectal use ===
Occasionally the pipe is inserted rectally to administer an alcohol enema. Called butt-chugging or boofing, this method of alcohol consumption can be dangerous or even deadly because it leads to faster intoxication since the alcohol is absorbed directly into the bloodstream and bypasses the body's ability to reject the toxin by vomiting.

== In popular culture ==
Beer bongs came to national attention in the US in 2006 after a photograph of Senator John Kerry being offered one by a University of Iowa journalism major at a tailgate party made national newspaper front pages.

== See also ==
- List of drinking games
