= Whales Tales =

Drinking game

Wales Tails
- Genres: Drinking
- Players: 2+, usually 4-8, and ideally 5 or 7
- Setup time: 0
- Playing time: varies
- Chance: Low

Whales Tales (alternatively, "Wales Tails" or "Prince") is a fast-paced, vocal drinking game, which is simply described as a form of "Tag, you're it," where one player (the "Prince") standing in a circle of players begins by declaring the number of players and then calling on another player by number.

== Rules ==
These are some typical rules:

Declaring

The Prince beings a round by (A) drinking, then (B) declaring (1) the total number of players ("Knights") standing in the circle, followed by (2) a number designating a target player by number of places to the left relative to the "Prince".

Phrasing of the Prince's declaration can vary. Examples of common declarations include:

"Whales Tales, the Prince of Whales, Prince in the court of (number of players) calls (target player number),"

"I see <number of players> knights and a Prince. And (target player number)."

The declaration is not complete until the Prince uses a designated word, e.g.,

"... Prince in the court of 5 CALLS 3" or

"I see 4 knights and a prince . . .AND 2 . . ."

Responding

The target player responds "nah," the speaker then asks "Who?", and the target player responds with a number designated the next target player, to the left relative to the target player. In fast games, the targeted players do not wait to hear a "who" but in essence respond "Nah <next target player number> . . . Who?"

The sequence of number, nah, who? continues until a mistake is made.

A target player failing to respond promptly, another player responding when not called, a player not following the specific phrasing, or a late "who?" are errors that stop the round. The erring player become the new prince, drinks, and declares to begin a new round.

If multiple players chirp, or a player chirps and the target player misses (fails to respond), the left-most player becomes the new Prince. The new Prince may try to cause the other players to chirp by blurting numbers prior to using the designated trigger word. "I see 4 knights and a prince... 3, 2, 5 knights and a prince, AND ..."

Blunders

Mistakes stopping play and requiring a drink by blundering players include:

- Improperly stating the initial declaration immediately before calling a target player.
- Failure to take a drink prior to making a declaration.
- Playing with an empty cup / vessel
- When a target payer responds too slowly (a "miss").
- When an uncalled person responds out of turn (a "chirp").
- A slow, or no, "who?" from a responding player

Pointing with one's finger is a blunder that requires a drink. Players must indicate other players using their elbow.

A new player joining the game becomes the new Prince. When a player leaves the game, the player to the left of the leaving player becomes the new Prince.

Example game

Four players A, B, C, and D stand in a circle:
A

B C

D

A is the Prince and declares: "Whales Tales, the Prince of Wales, calls regular rotational tails, on a court of 4 on 2

D: "nay"

A: "who"

D: "3"

C: "nay"

D: "who"

C: "4"

C: "nay,who,1"

D: "nay"

C: "who"

D: "1"

B: "nay"

D: "who"

and so on....

== Variations ==
- The Prince may declare and respond to themselves multiple times before calling a target player. For example, "I see 4 knights and a Prince, and 5, nah who? 5, nah who? 3." Alternatively, the Prince may call themselves by zero, for example, by calling "nought" or "aught".
- The Prince may declare a variation of the rules. For example, "Whales Tales, the Prince of Whales, Prince calls <type of> tales, in the court of (number of players), on (target player number)." Example variations include:
  - blindfolded
  - facing outward
  - playing at far corners of the room
  - pants around the ankles while spinning in a circle
- Landmines. Players who want to participate but are learning or too slow to keep up may opt to be designated a landmine. The other players cannot call the landmine's number. If the a landmine is called, (ideally) the landmine says "Boom!" and the calling player becomes the next Prince.

== Cultural Influence and legacy ==
A session of Whales Tales, dubbed "Rotating Prince," is described in Thomas Pynchon's novel Gravity's Rainbow. Pynchon's reference to the game has itself been called "a dramatized reading and interpretation of Gravity's Rainbow. The Pynchon industry has, of course, been immersed in a session of the game for three decades."

Track 4 of the Cocteau Twins album Victorialand is titled "Whales Tales."

== Origins ==
Whales Tales reached its heyday in the late 1930s after the Abdication of Edward VIII, the Prince of Wales, and was played in fraternities at least as early as the 1960s.

Whales Tales bears some resemblance to certain traditional children's games, including The priest of the parish,, which reportedly dates back to the Napoleonic Wars of the early 19th century, King Plaster Palacey, and The Prince of Wales (or Prince of Paris).
