= Drinking game =

Game which involves the consumption of alcoholic beverages

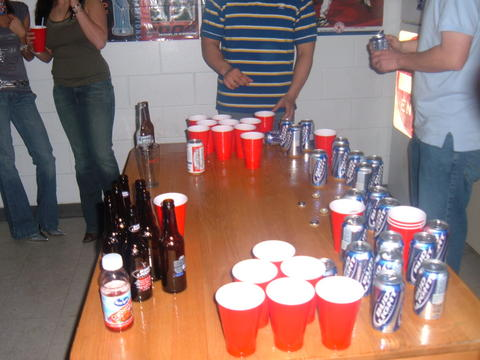
Beer pong is a drinking game in which players throw ping pong balls across a table, attempting to land each ball in a cup of beer on the other end.

Drinking games are games which involve the consumption of alcoholic beverages and often enduring the subsequent intoxication resulting from them. Evidence of the existence of drinking games dates back to antiquity. Drinking games have been banned at some institutions, particularly colleges and universities.

== History ==
=== Ancient Greece ===
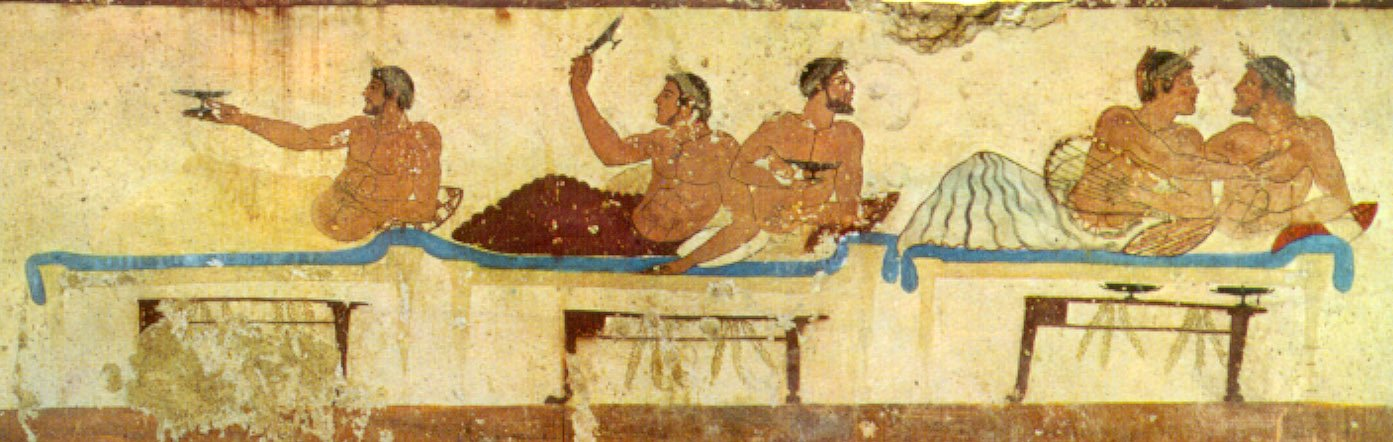
Symposium, with scene of Kottabos – fresco from the Tomb of the Diver in Paestum, 475 BC

Kottabos is one of the earliest known drinking games from ancient Greece, dated to the 5th to 4th centuries BC. Players would use dregs (remnants of what was left in their cup) to hit targets across the room with their wine. Often, there were special prizes and penalties for performance in the game.

=== China ===
Drinking games were enjoyed in ancient China, usually incorporating the use of dice or verbal exchange of riddles. During the Tang dynasty (618–907), the Chinese used a silver canister where written lots could be drawn that designated which player had to drink and specifically how much; for example, from 1, 5, 7, or 10 measures of drink that the youngest player, or the last player to join the game, or the most talkative player, or the host, or the player with the greatest alcohol tolerance, etc. had to drink. There were even drinking game referee officials, including a 'registrar of the rules' who knew all the rules to the game, a 'registrar of the horn' who tossed a silver flag down on calling out second offenses, and a 'governor' who decided one's third call of offense. These referees were used mainly for maintaining order (as drinking games often became rowdy) and for reviewing faults that could be punished with a player drinking a penalty cup. If a guest was considered a 'coward' for dropping out of the game, he could be branded as a 'deserter' and not invited back to further drinking bouts. There was another game where little puppets and dolls dressed as western foreigners with blue eyes (Iranian peoples) were set up and when one fell over, the person it pointed to had to empty his cup of wine.

Drinking games became popular among elites in the late Qing period as part of the privileged class' urban leisure aesthetics. Novelists who invented literary-themed drinking games included Li Boyuan and Sun Yusheng. Drinking games also increasingly appeared as elements in novels of the period such as Yu Da's The Dream in the Green Bower.

=== Germany ===
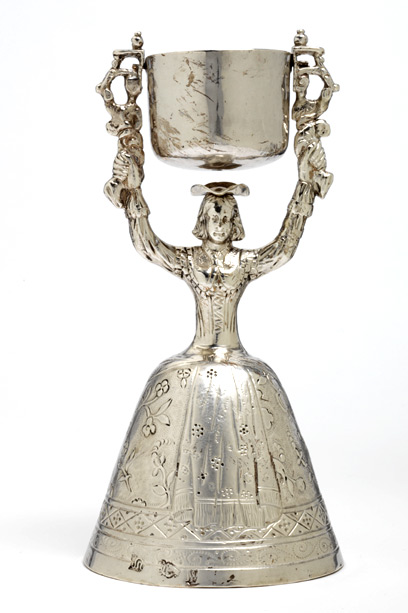
A wager cup

Drinking games in 19th century Germany included Bierskat, Elfern, Rammes and Quodlibet, as well as Schlauch and Laubober, probably the same game as Grasobern. But the "crown of all drinking games" was one with an ancient and distinctive name: Cerevis. One feature of the game was that everything went under a different name from normal. So the cards (Karten) were called 'spoons' (Löffel), the Sevens were 'Septembers' and the Aces were the 'Juveniles' (junge Leichtsinn). A player who used the normal names was penalised. Every time a card was played, it was supposed to be accompanied by humorous words, so if a Jack or Unter was played, the player might say something like "my merry Unterkasser" (Lustig mein Unterkasser) or "long live my Unterkasser" (Vivat mein Unterkasser). If his opponent beat it, he might say "hang the Unterkasser" (Hängt den Unterkasser). The loser had to chalk up a figure such as a swallow, a wheel or a pair of scissors depending on the number of minus points gained and was only allowed to erase them once he had drunk the associated amount of beer.

Silver wager cups, also known as wedding cups, were used in Germany from the late 16th to mid 17th century. The smaller cup is on a pivot so both vessels can be face-up and filled with liquor. In wedding ceremonies, the man would drink from the larger vessel first, then turning the figure right side up, pass it to the woman, who would drink from the smaller cup; the challenge was for the two drinkers not to spill any liquor. They were also sometimes used during wine drinking boughts where a wager was placed if participant(s) could drink the contents of both sides without spilling a drop. In Germany they are known as Jungfrauenbecher, or maiden cups. Replicas of the cups were frequently manufactured during the 1880s to 1910s.

== Types ==
=== Endurance ===
The simplest drinking games are endurance games in which players compete to out-drink one another. Players take turns taking shots, and the last person standing is the winner. Some games have rules involving the "cascade", "fountain", or "waterfall", which encourages each player to drink constantly from their cup so long as the player before him does not stop drinking. Such games can also favor speed over quantity, in which players race to drink a case of beer the fastest. Often drinking large amounts will be combined with a stylistic element or an abnormal method of drinking, as with the boot of beer, yard of ale, or a keg stand.

Tolerance games are simply about seeing which player can last the longest. It can be as simple as two people matching each other drink for drink until one of the participants "passes out". Power hour and its variant, centurion, fall under this category.

=== Speed ===
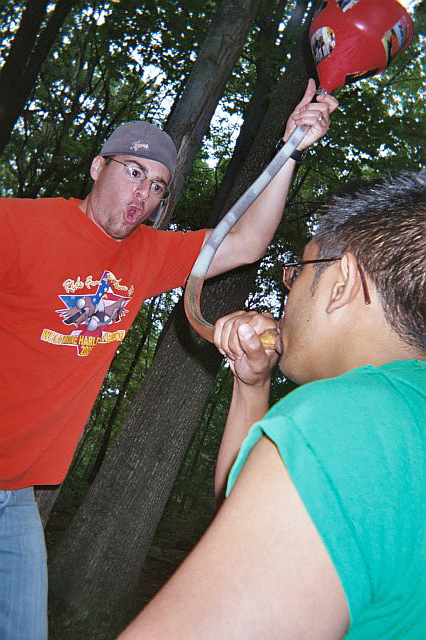
Bonging is popular among college students.

Many pub or bar games involve competitive drinking for speed. Examples of such drinking games are Edward Fortyhands, boat races, beer bonging, shotgunning, flippy cup (a team-based speed game), and yard. Some say that the most important skill to improving speed is to relax and take fewer but larger gulps. There are a variety of individual tactics to accomplishing this, such as bending the knees in anticipation, or when drinking from a plastic cup, squeezing the sides of the cup to form a more perfect funnel.

Athletic races involving alcohol including the beer mile, which consists of a mile run with a can of beer consumed before each of the four laps. A variant is known in German speaking countries as Bierkastenlauf (beer crate running) where a team of two carries a crate of beer along a route of several kilometers and must consume all of the bottles prior to crossing the finish line.

=== Skill ===
Some party and pub games focus on the performance of a particular act of skill, rather than on either the amount a participant drinks or the speed with which they do so. Examples include beer pong, quarters, chandeliers (also known as gauchoball, rage cage, stack cup), caps, polish horseshoes, pong, baseball, and beer darts.

Pub golf involves orienteering and pub crawling together.

A unique drinking game is made in the tavern Oepfelchammer in Zürich, Switzerland. It is called "Balkenprobe" and which involves climbing up a beam at the ceiling and moving to another beam and then to drink a glass of wine with the head hanging down.

=== Luck ===
Party games like the Korean apateu are mostly luck, as it has the players stack their hands, after which the leader shouts out a number, and whoever has their hand at that position in the stack will drink.

=== Thinking ===
Thinking games rely on the players' powers of observation, recollection, logic and articulation.

Numerous types of thinking games exist, including Think or Drink, 21, beer checkers, bizz buzz, buffalo, saved by the bell, bullshit, tourettes, matchboxes, never have I ever, roman numerals, fuzzy duck, pennying, Whales Tales, wine games, and Zoom Schwartz Profigliano. Trivia games, such as Trivial Pursuit, are sometimes played as drinking games.

=== Card and dice ===
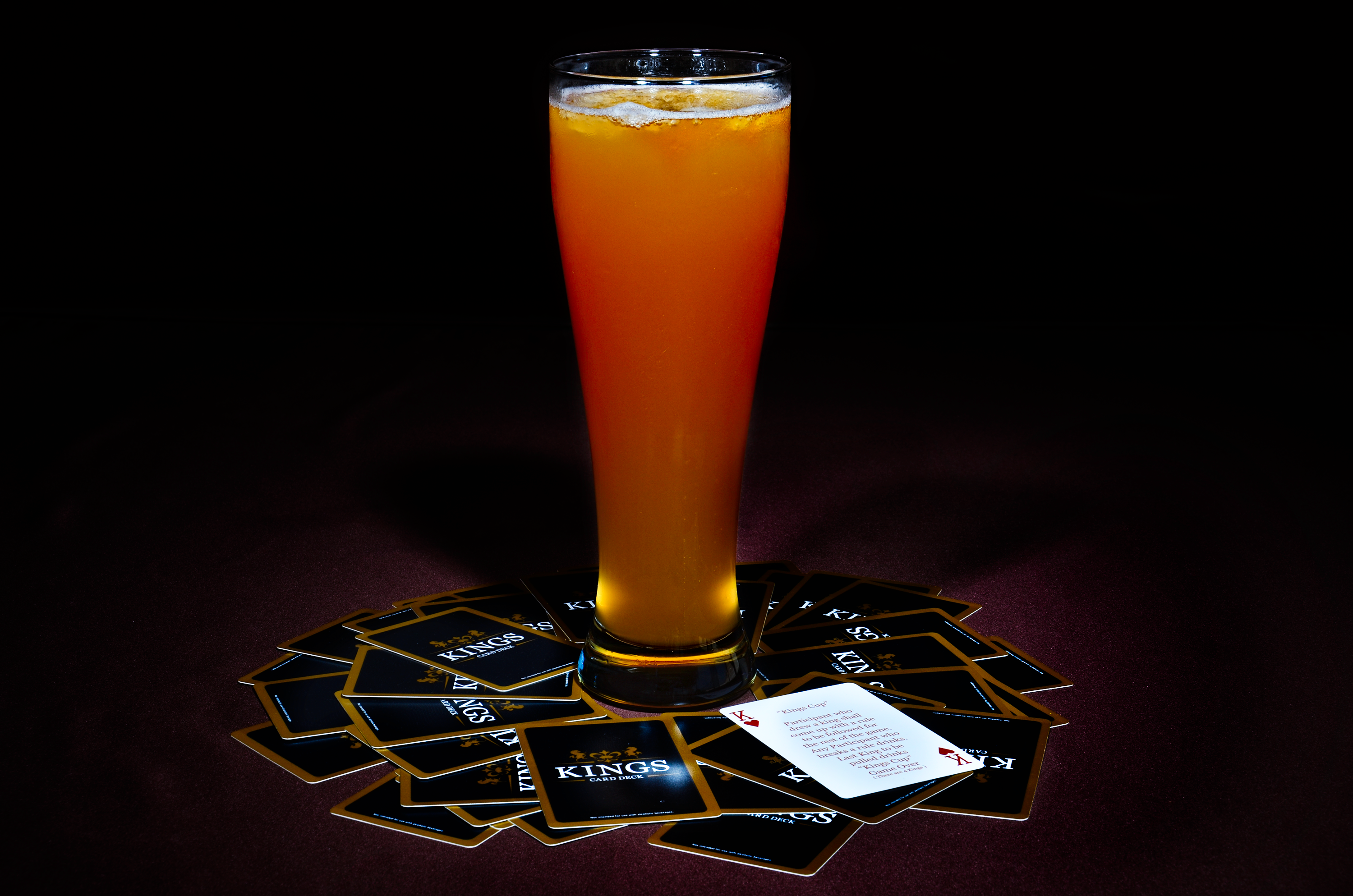
Kings is played with cards.

Drinking games involving cards include president, horserace, Kings, liar's poker, pyramid, ring of fire and toepen.

Dice games include beer die, dudo, kinito, liar's dice, Mexico, mia, three man, and ship, captain, and crew.

=== Arts ===
Movie drinking games are played while watching a movie (sometimes a TV show or a sporting event) and have a set of rules for who drinks when and how much based on on-screen events and dialogue. The rules may be the same for all players, or alternatively players may each be assigned rules related to particular characters. The rules are designed so that rarer events require larger drinks. Rule sets for such games are usually arbitrary and local, although they are sometimes published by fan clubs.

In reference to film, a popular game among young adults consists of printing out a mustache and taping it on the television screen. Every time the mustache fits appropriately to a person on the screen, one must drink the designated amount.

Live drinking games such as Los Angeles–based "A Drinking Game" involve recreating films of the 80s in a "Rocky Horror" fashion, with gift bags, drinking cues, and costumed actors. A suggestion to "do six shots for SEAL Team 6" following every mention of Osama bin Laden at the 2012 Democratic National Convention necessitated a prominent disclaimer on the satire site that posted it, as the quantity of alcohol ingested would probably have been lethal.

"Datsyuk Game" involves a Datsyuk highlight reel being played and contestants drink every time the word Datsyuk is mentioned. The ceremonial playing of the Russian national anthem before the game is another tradition.

Music can also be used as a basis for drinking games. The song "Thunderstruck" by AC/DC is used in which a player begins drinking when the word "thunder" is sung and switches to the next player each time "thunder" is sung, until the end of the song.

Sport related drinking games involve the participants each selecting a scenario of the game resulting in their drink being downed. Examples of this include participants each picking a footballer in a game while other versions require multiple players to be selected. Should a player score or be sent off, a drink must be taken. Another version requires a drink for every touch a player takes of the ball.

=== Hybrid games ===
Some drinking games can fall into multiple categories such as power hour which is a primarily an endurance-based game, but can also incorporate the arts if players are prompted to drink by a playlist that changes songs every 60 seconds. Similarly, flip cup combines the skill of flipping cups with the speed of drinking quickly prior to flipping.

=== Russian roulette ===
There is a drinking game based on Russian roulette. The game involves six shot glasses filled by a non-player: five are filled with water, but the sixth with vodka. Among some groups, low quality vodka is preferred, as it makes the glass representing the filled chamber less desirable. The glasses are arranged in a circle, and players take turns choosing a glass to take a shot from at random; the one who drinks the vodka one loses. Additionally, the five players who drink the water may shout "Click" while the vodka drinker may shout "Bang".

There is also a game called "Beer Hunter" (titled after the Russian roulette scenes in the film The Deer Hunter). In this game, six cans of beer are placed between the participants: one can is vigorously shaken, and the cans are scrambled. The participants then take turns opening the cans of beer right under their noses; the player who opens the shaken can (and thus sprays beer up their nose) is deemed the loser.

Both are non-lethal compared to the game with the firearm which is almost always lethal.

== Health and social concerns ==
Drinking games are popular social activities, particularly among young adults and college students, but they come with significant health risks. These games often encourage rapid alcohol consumption, often leading to heavy drinking, which can result in severe consequences such as alcohol poisoning:

- Beer pong. Some writers have mentioned beer pong as contributing to "out of control" college drinking.
- Power hour. Players may have difficulty completing the specified number of drinks as the rate of consumption can raise their blood alcohol content to high levels.
- Keg stand is another drinking game known for its extreme consumption style.
- Neknominate. The original rules of the game require the participants to film themselves drinking a pint of an alcoholic beverage. Five people are believed to have died as a result of playing the game, including a Cardiff man thought to have downed a pint of vodka, and a London hostel worker who reportedly mixed an entire bottle of white wine with a quarter bottle of whisky, a small bottle of vodka and a can of lager. In the latter case, the victim's nominator was interviewed by police, but it was ruled an accidental death without coercion.

== See also ==
- Binge drinking
- Pregaming
- List of drinking games
- List of public house topics
- Beerfest

== Literature ==
- Lese-Stübchen: Illustrirte Unterhaltungs-Blätter für Familie und Haus. Vol. 3. Brünn. 1862.
- Haupt, Richard (1877). Neues Bücher-Lexicon. Vol. Part 13 A-K. Leipzig: Weigel.
