= 2007 Origins Award winners =

The following are the winners of the 34th annual (2007) Origins Award, presented at the 2008 Origins Game Fair

Category	Winner	Company	Designer(s)
Miniatures Rules of the Year	Classic Battletech	Catalyst Game Labs	Jordan Weisman
Miniature or Miniatures Line of the Year	Titania's Fury	Dragonfire Laser Crafts Inc.	
Collectible Card Game of the Year	Legend of the Five Rings	Alderac Entertainment Group	Mark Wootton
Historical Miniature Game of the Year	Check Your 6!	Skirmish Campaigns	Scott Fisher
Historical Miniatures Line of the Year	Romano-British 15mm	Splintered Light Miniatures	David McBride
Historical Board Game of the Year	Age of Empires III: The Age of Discovery	Tropical Games	Glenn Drover
Non-Fiction Publication of the Year	Hobby Games: The 100 Best	Green Ronin	Edited by James Lowder
Fiction Publication of the Year	Astounding Hero Tales	Hero Games	Edited by James Lowder
Game Accessory of the Year	Call of Cthulhu Dice Set	Q-Workshop	
Roleplaying Game Supplement of the Year	Codex Arcanis	Paradigm Concepts	Team Paradigm
Roleplaying Game of the Year	Aces & Eights: Shattered Frontier	Kenzer and Company	Jolly R. Blackburn, Brian Jelke, Steve Johansson, Dave Kenzer, Jennifer Kenzer and Mark Plemmon
Traditional Card Game of the Year	Zombie Fluxx	Looney Labs	Andrew Looney
Board Game or Expansion of the Year	StarCraft: The Board Game	Fantasy Flight Games	Corey Konieczka and Christian T. Petersen
Hall of Fame Inductees	R. A. Salvatore; Vampire: The Masquerade – White Wolf Games; Paranoia – Mongoose Publishing		
