= 2001 Origins Award winners =

The following are the winners of the 28th annual (2001) Origins Award, presented at Origins 2002:

Category	Winner	Company	Designer(s)
Best Game Accessory	d20 System Character Record Folio	Green Ronin Publishing	Jeff Mackintosh
Best Amateur Game Periodical	Alarums & Excursions	Lee Gold	
Best Professional Game Peridodical	Dork Tower	Dork Storm Press	John Kovalic
Best Play By Mail Game	Middle Earth FA 1000	Game Systems	
Best Game Related Novel	Clan War 7th Scroll: The Lion	Wizards of the Coast	Stephen D. Sullivan
Best Game Related Short Work	Prometheus Unwound	Eden Studios	Matt Forbeck
Best Historical Miniature Rules	Fear God and Dread Nought	Clash of Arms Games	Larry Bond, Chris Carlson, Mike Harris, Ed Kettler
Best Science Fiction or Fantasy Miniatures Rules	D&D Chainmail Miniatures	Wizards of the Coast	Skaff Elias, Chris Pramas
Best Historical Figure Miniature Series	World of the Greeks	Wargames Foundry	
Best Science Fiction or Fantasy Miniature	Mage Knight Great Fire Dragon	WizKids	Kevin Barrett
Best Vehicular Miniature	Mage Knight Atlantis War Machine: The Fist of Fezk	WizKids	Kevit Barrett
Best Abstract Board Game	Cosmic Coasters	Looney Labs	Andrew Looney
Best Historical Board Game	Axis & Allies: Pacific	Hasbro/Avalon Hill	Stephen Baker, Rob Daviau
Best Science Fiction or Fantasy Board Game	Risk 2210	Hasbro/Avalon Hill	Craig Van Ness, Rob Daviau, Albert Lamorisse
Best Card Game Expansion or Supplement	Apples to Apples Expansion Set 3	Out of the Box Publishing	Mark Alan Osterhaus, Ellen Osterhaus, Cathleen Quinn-Kinney, Al Waller
Best Trading Card Game	The Lord of the Rings TCG	Decipher, Inc.	Tom Liscke, Mike Reynolds, Chuck Kallenbach, Justin Pakes, Tim Ellington
Best Traditional Card Game	Munchkin	Steve Jackson Games	Steve Jackson
Best Graphic Presentation of a Board Game	Zombies!!!	Journeyman Press	Todd A. Breitnestein, David Aikins
Best Graphic Presentation of a Card Game	The Lord of the Rings TCG	Decipher, Inc.	Dan Burns, Joe Boulden, Ed Gartin, Leslie Burns, Mike Schley
Best Graphic Presentation of a Book Product	Call of Cthulhu 20th Anniversary Edition	Chaosium	Sandy Petersen, Lynn Willis, Charlie Krank
Best Illustration	Dork Shadows: cover	Dork Storm Press	John Kovalic
Best Role-Playing Game Adventure	Unseen Masters	Chaosium, Inc.	Bruce Ballon
Best Role-Playing Game Supplement	Forgotten Realms Campaign Setting	Wizards of the Coast	Ed Greenwood, Sean K. Reynolds, Skip Williams, Rob Heinsoo
Best Role-Playing Game	Adventure!	White Wolf Game Studio	James Kiley, Michael B. Lee, Clayton Oliver
Game of the Year	Hackmaster	Kenzer & Co.	Jolly R. Blackburn, Brian Jelke, Steve Johansson, David S. Kenzer
Hall of Fame Inductees	Margaret Weis		
Hall of Fame Inductees	Tracy Hickman		
Hall of Fame Inductees	Settlers of Catan - Klaus Teuber		
