= Mike Young (game designer) =

Role-playing game designer

- Occupation: Game designer

Mike Young is an American game designer, author, and founder of the first independent professional LARP publishing house, "Interactivities Ink".

== Works ==
Young's works include co-authorship of Rules to Live By (RTLB), one of the few published generic (non-license, not from tabletop) LARP systems. He has also published several LARPs, card games, and contributed short pieces to the professional LARP journal Metagame from 1989 through 1999. His The Galactic Emperor is Dead LARP was sold to Skotos Inc for their online game play.

Young's Tales From the Floating Vagabond 1 (1990), Tales From the Floating Vagabond 2 (1992), and Tales From the Floating Vagabond Square Root of Pi (1997) were officially licensed LARPs run in the Tales from the Floating Vagabond RPG setting originally published by Avalon Hill. The first two were run with the creator of Tales from the Floating Vagabond, Lee Garvin.

He has also authored computer games (from Alien Software), including the Neophyte series. He is credited on Legend Entertainment's Callahan's Crosstime Saloon and Blackstone Chronicles. He is also credited as a level designer and developer for Icebreaker from Magnet Interactive Studios.

Young has also published three card games, one of which, Hamlet: A Game In Five Acts, won an award in the Polycon Independent Game Design Contest.

In addition to designing games and LARP punditry, Young works for Biap Systems as a computer programmer. He was the lead developer for NBC Olympics Now, which was nominated for a 2007 Technology and Engineering Emmy Award in the category of "Outstanding Achievement in Advanced Media Technology for the Synchronous Enhancement of Original Television Content." He has also had two entries published in the Bulwer-Lytton Fiction Contest.
