= List of Celluloid Dreams productions (2020–2029) =

The following is a list of films originally produced by Celluloid Dreams and released in the 2020s.

== Films ==
Year	Original title	English title	Director	Country	Notes
2020	خورشید (Khoršid)	Sun Children	Majid Majidi	Iran	
2020	The Book of Vision	—N/a	Carlo Hintermann	Italy	
2020	Miss Marx	—N/a	Susanna Nicchiarelli	Italy	Biopic of Eleanor Marx, youngest daughter of Karl Marx
2020	Casa de Antiguidades	Memory House	João Paulo Miranda Maria	Portugal	
2020	Death of a Ladies' Man	—N/a	Matt Bissonnette	Canada; Ireland	
2021	Why Are We (Not) Creative?	—N/a	Hermann Vaske	Germany	
2022	Luxembourg, Luxembourg	—N/a	Antonio Lukich	Ukraine	
2022	The Maiden	—N/a	Graham Foy	Canada	
2022	خرس نیست (Khers Nist)	There are no bears No Bears	Jafar Panahi	Iran	
2023	Infinity Pool	—N/a	Brandon Cronenberg	Canada; France	
TBA	Untitled William S. Burroughs project	—N/a	Ben Foster	United States	Foster previously played Burroughs in Kill Your Darlings (2013).
TBA	Crooks	—N/a	Mickey Keating	United States	
TBA	The Golden Suicides	—N/a	Gaspar Noé	France; United States	Based on the Vanity Fair article of the same name about Theresa Duncan and Jeremy Blake.
TBA	Gray Area	TBA	TBA	TBA	
