= Beyond the Wall =

Beyond the Wall(s) may refer to:

- Beyond the Wall (EP), an EP by Rage
- Beyond the Wall (album), an album by Kenny Garrett
- "Beyond the Wall" (Game of Thrones), an episode of the television series Game of Thrones
- Beyond the Wall: Pictland & The North, a supplement for the role-playing game Pendragon
- "Beyond the Wall" (short story), a 1907 ghost story by Ambrose Bierce
- Beyond the Walls (1964 film), a/k/a Duvarların Ötesi, a Turkish drama film directed by Orhan Elmas
- Beyond the Walls (1984 film), a/k/a MeAhorei HaSoragim, an Israeli film directed by Uri Barbash
- Beyond the Walls (2008 film), a/k/a La Battue, a Canadian short drama film directed by Guy Édoin
- Beyond the Walls (2012 film), a/k/a Hors les murs, a French-Belgian-Canadian drama film directed by David Lambert
- Beyond the Wall (2022 film), an Iranian drama
- Beyond the Walls (TV series), a 2015 French horror miniseries, originally titled Au-delà des Murs
- Beyond the Wall (2023 book), a non-fiction book about East Germany
- Beyond the Wall, a 2003 book by Stephen Shore
- Beyond the Wall: Stories Behind the Vietnam Wall, a 1995 educational video game
- "Beyond the Walls", a 1995 animation by Animusic

== See also ==
- Beyond the Wall of Sleep (disambiguation)
- Behind the Walls (disambiguation)
