= Fluxx =

Looney Labs card game

- Comparison of cards from English and German versions.
- Manufacturers: DeLano Services (most); 360 Manufacturing (mass market)
- Publishers: Looney Laboratory, Inc.; Fully Baked Ideas (Stoner, Drinking); PS Games (nl); Pegasus Games (de); HobbyJapan (ja)
- Players: 2–6
- Setup time: 1 minute
- Playing time: 5-30 minutes
- Chance: High

Fluxx is a card game published by Looney Labs. The rules and the conditions for winning are altered throughout the game via cards played by the players.

== History ==
Fluxx was created by Andrew Looney on July 24, 1996 as the first game for Looney Labs, a small games company established by husband-and-wife team Andy (who invents the games) and Kristin Looney (who runs the company as its Chief Executive Officer). The original print run was for 5,000 units and was released in 1997.

The game was successful and was licensed a year later to Iron Crown Enterprises (ICE) for wider distribution. ICE went bankrupt two years later and Looney Labs resumed publication and distribution. By March 2001, Labs was considering putting out another standalone deck version called Fluxx++ using cards created by the Fluxx playing community with Fluxx Blanxx and Fluxx: Goals Galore, an expansion consisting of goal cards, based on its Origins 2000 5 Goal cards promo pack. Labs created Fluxx Lite, a slimmed down 56 card deck to lower the price for discount superstores, in design by March 2002.

In 2003, Amigo Games, a German game company, licensed and published a German language version of Fluxx. The in design Fluxx Reduxx was indefinitely placed on hold as of July 14, 2005 to focus on EcoFluxx. Looney Labs registered the Fluxx trademark. By October 2005, Stoner Fluxx had been released and EcoFluxx was in play testing, and scheduled to be released later that month followed by Family Fluxx.

In November 2006, Looney Labs issued a Spanish language edition of the game. The October 10, 2007 release of a zombie-themed version brought the first of a new card type, the Creeper and Ungoal. In 2008, Toy Vault and Looney Labs co-published and released Monty Python Fluxx. Fluxx edition 4 was released in December 2008 and was the first set to have the Meta Rule subtype card, which stemmed from a Fluxx Tournament rule.

In 2008, Zombie Fluxx won the Origins Award for Traditional Card Game of the Year. Stoner Fluxx was placed back in print under the Full Baked Ideas imprint of Looney Labs on November 13, 2009 after being out of print for four years. Full Baked was launched with expectation of a future release of a drinking variant and other mature subject versions.

Two variants were re-released on March 5, 2010, EcoFluxx and Family Fluxx, with Eco being a new edition. In February 2011, the Surprise subtype of cards were introduced in the Pirate Fluxx themed variant. In March 2011, the German language version 2nd edition was released by Pegasus Games. By May 2011 over 1 million decks of all Fluxx versions had been sold while Pirate Fluxx was getting into bookstores that month.

On August 1, 2012, Looney Labs got a simplified, less expensive general market version with redesigned packaging of Fluxx into Target stores. For the summer 2012, Fluxx was number 10 in ICv2's Top 10 Card/Building Games (hobby channel).

A Cartoon Network version of the game was made available as a Target exclusive from mid-August 2014 until Easter 2015, while in July the Regular Show Fluxx was released to the hobby market. The fifth edition of the regular Fluxx game was made available beginning in 2014 as the 4.0 edition ran out. Looney Labs teamed up with The Doubleclicks for a Fluxx theme song.

A new expansion of the game, Fluxx Dice, plus two new licensed variants were scheduled to be released in the summer of 2015. With a delay of the first variant to be released at the polled requested of the retailers, Looney Labs pushed back the dice and the other variant to stagger the releases to spread out the impact.

A series of educational variants were released in 2017 and 2018. In partnership with Gale Force 9, two Fluxx versions of Star Trek were released in August 2018.

== Game description and play ==
The first edition deck consists of 84 cards with four types of cards: Keepers, Goals, Actions, and New Rules. While the game begins by requiring players to simply draw and play a specific number of cards, the mechanic mutates when a New Rule card is played. The card may change the number of cards drawn or played per turn, the number of cards held per hand, or the Keepers played. The Goal cards change the Keepers needed to win the game. Games last from 5 to 30 minutes.

Later sets sometimes included new card subtypes, depending on the theme of the set. These included Creeper cards that block or make goals more difficult to obtain; Ungoal cards, which have conditions where the game ends with no winner; and Surprise cards, a 2011 addition, which allow players to negate other types of cards which could prevent a victory and can be played at any time, though they have other effects when played on one's own turn.

The first Fluxx tournament at Origins 1997 had an extra rule calling for an increase in the Basic Rules each time the deck was reshuffled which was kept for future tournaments. On August 28, 2008 via their Wunderland blog, Looney introduced "Meta Rule" cards for players to print at home and add to standard decks or place in the primary deck Edition 4.0.

Early edition decks had 84 cards while newer standard decks have 100 cards, while Lite versions (Family, Spanish, SE) consist of 56 cards.

== Card sets ==
=== Editions ===
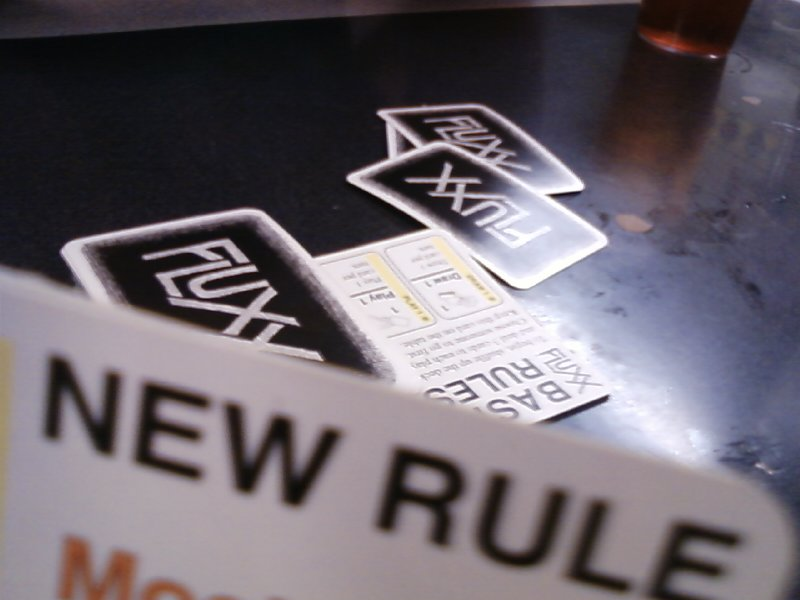
Fluxx 3.1 cards look similar to earlier versions.

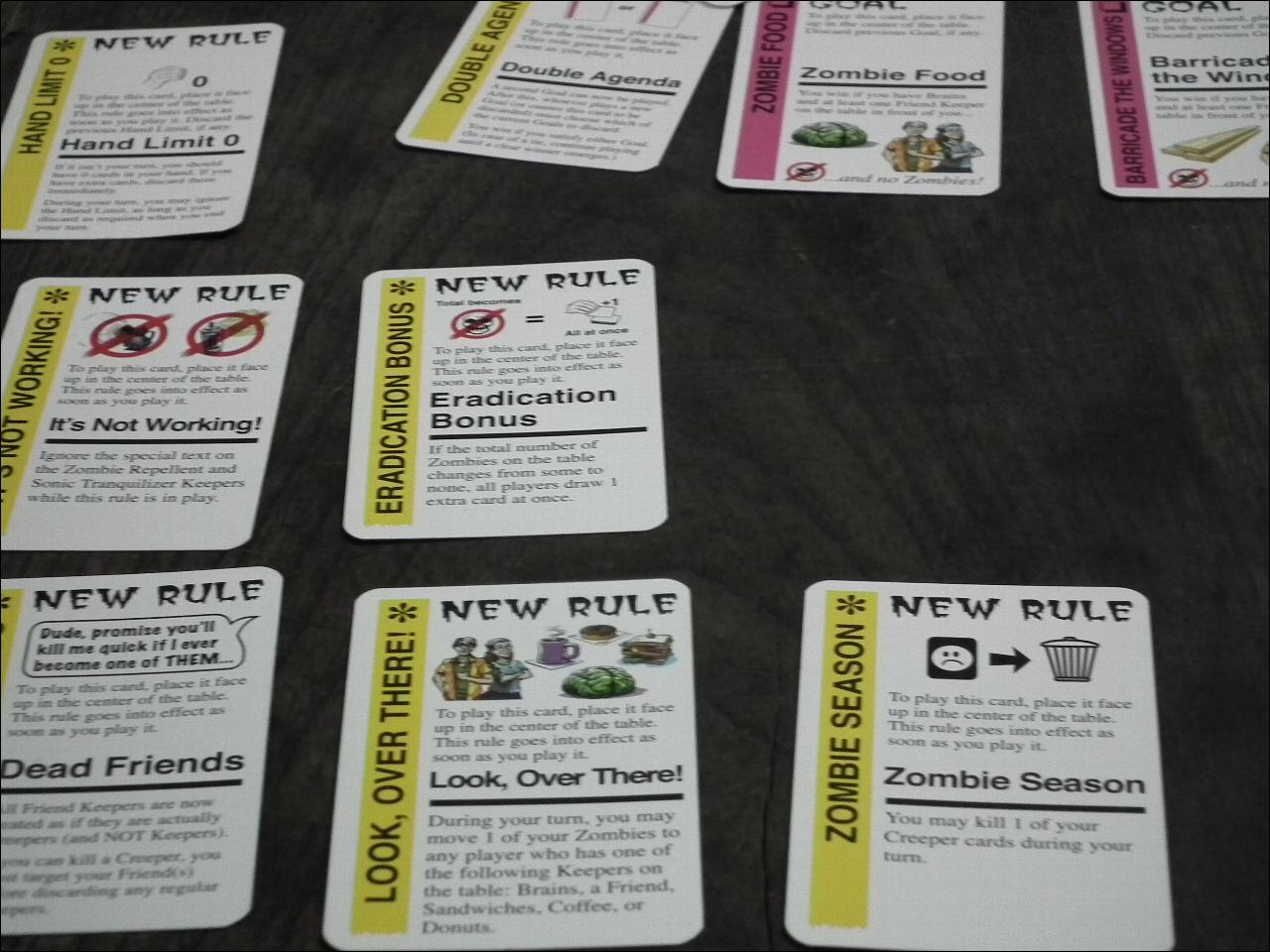
Zombie Fluxx cards in play, including New Rules (yellow) and Goals (pink).

Edition	Release date	Notes
Fluxx 1.0	1996	The first released edition of the game. The cards are poker-sized and are entirely in monochrome, without any colored stripe. It was manufactured by C&W Playing Cards, Inc. and published through Looney Labs.
Fluxx 2.0	1998	An updated version of the original. The cards are bridge-sized, in a new layout with color encoded sections (although images remain in black and white). It was manufactured by Cartamundi and published by Iron Crown Enterprises.
Fluxx 2.1	2000	A reprint of Fluxx 2.0 with some minor changes. It was manufactured by Cartamundi and published by Looney Labs.
Fluxx 3.0	2003	Adds and removes several cards to improve the balance of the game. Manufactured by Cartamundi, published by Looney Labs.
Stoner Fluxx	October 2003	The first variant of Fluxx. This is an "adult" oriented version of the game published to help accelerate the conversation in the US about ending marijuana prohibition. The cards in this version are not compatible with other Fluxx decks (as they read "Stoner Fluxx" on the back). Went out of print in 2005.
Fluxx 3.1	2005	A reprint of Fluxx 3.0 with minor changes. new style Basic Rule card, two cards removed, one card added; Manufactured by Cartamundi, published by Looney Labs.
EcoFluxx	October 2005	A variant that focuses on the flora and fauna of what makes the planet. It was created by Alison Frane (nee Looney). Contains 84 cards.
Family Fluxx	November 2005	A full-color "Family-Friendly" version of the game with simplified rules and family bonuses. It was initially designed as Fluxx Lite and then Fluxx Jr..
Zombie Fluxx	October 2007	Introduces the "Creeper" and "Ungoal" type cards. 100 cards Won the 2008 Origins Award for Traditional Card Game of the Year.
Fluxx 4.0	2008	Increases the card number set in the primary Fluxx set to 100. Images are now in full color. Introduces Meta Rules and Creepers to the primary Fluxx set.
Monty Python Fluxx	October 20, 2008	Includes 100 cards with artwork from Todd Cameron Hamilton. It is the first Fluxx game to be based on a licensed property. (October 2008) It was co-published with Monty Python licensee, Toy Vault;
Martian Fluxx	September 25, 2009	
Stoner Fluxx 2.0	November 13, 2009	An updated version of Stoner Fluxx with full-color cards and Creepers. Released under "Fully Baked Ideas" imprint of Looney Labs, with 5% of proceeds going to end cannabis prohibition groups; Contains 100 cards. Several undated minor updates of 2.0 - 2.1 and 2.2, were also released.
Family Fluxx 1.1	March 5, 2010	Re-release of Family Fluxx in the current packaging style of other Fluxx games. Same cards as the original. Currently out of print
Eco Fluxx 2.0	March 5, 2010	An updated version of Eco Fluxx with new color artwork from Derek Ring and the addition of some new cards including three Creepers. Has 100 cards altogether.
Pirate Fluxx	February 11, 2011	Introduces Surprise cards.
StarFluxx	September 30, 2011	
Oz Fluxx	March 23, 2012	
Fluxx SE	August 1, 2012	A "Basic Entry" version of the game with simplified rules and exclusive cards. It was manufactured by 360 Manufacturing and was released exclusively in Target stores.
Cthulhu Fluxx	August 17, 2012	
Fluxx SE 1.1	October 2013	Reprint of Fluxx SE with the debut of the new card designs used for the game going forward. As with the original, it was released exclusively at Target stores.
Monster Fluxx	October 2013	Manufactured by 360 Manufacturing and was released exclusively in Target stores. Uses Fluxx SE style gameplay.
Regular Show Fluxx	July 25, 2014	100 cards - out of print
Cartoon Network Fluxx	August 2014	Released exclusively in Target stores. Uses Fluxx SE style gameplay.
Fluxx 5.0	2014	Simplifies the standard version with the removal of all creepers and several other cards, 17 total, and are replaced by new Keepers, Goals, Actions, and New Rules cards.
Holiday Fluxx	October 3, 2014	Christmas themed version. Contains 100 cards with art by Ali Douglass.
Batman Fluxx	August 7, 2015	Co-published with Cryptozoic Entertainment
Adventure Time Fluxx	August 21, 2015	
Nature Fluxx	November 6, 2015	A renamed third edition of EcoFluxx with update cards and packaging & continuing its donation to its eco-causes.
Firefly Fluxx	January 15, 2016	Licensed from 20th Century Fox and Gale Force Nine
Math Fluxx 1.0	March 9, 2017	The first educational variant of Fluxx.
Chemistry Fluxx	May 25, 2017	The second "Educational" version.
Drinking Fluxx	July 24, 2017	An adult-oriented version of the game that focuses on alcoholic beverages. It was produced to celebrate the game's 21st Anniversary. Released under the Fully Baked Ideas imprint.
Doctor Who Fluxx	November 23, 2017	
Anatomy Fluxx	April 5, 2018	The third "Educational" version.
Star Trek: The Original Series Fluxx	August 2, 2018	Co-published with Gale Force 9
Star Trek: The Next Generation Fluxx	August 2, 2018	Co-published with Gale Force 9
Fairy Tale Fluxx	September 6, 2018	Art by Mary Engelbreit
Star Trek: Deep Space Nine Fluxx	May 23, 2019	
Marvel Fluxx	August 15, 2019	The first "Speciality Edition". Co-published with Cardinal Industries. Includes 7 exclusive cards, and a collectible coin
Jumanji Fluxx	August 15, 2019	The second "Speciality Edition". Co-published with Cardinal Industries. Introduces "Danger" cards that can eliminate players with the ability to return unless the deck then elimination is permanent. includes 7 exclusive cards, and a collectible coin.
Astronomy Fluxx	January 9, 2020	The fourth "Educational" version.
SpongeBob SquarePants Fluxx	May 21, 2020	The third "Speciality Edition". Co-published with Spin Master. includes 7 exclusive cards, and a collectible coin.
Fantasy Fluxx	January 7, 2021	
Martian Fluxx 1.1	March 11, 2021	Reprint of Martian Fluxx with the current card design.
Oz Fluxx 1.1	March 11, 2021	Reprint of Oz Fluxx with the current card design.
Wonderland Fluxx	October 14, 2021	Released in limited quantities. Given a wider release in 2023.
Fluxx Remixx	March 3, 2022	A version of Fluxx 5.0 with "remixed" goals, rules and actions, alongside the original keepers.
Olympus Fluxx	May 5, 2022	
Stoner Fluxx 2.3	2023	Reprint of Stoner Fluxx 2.2 with the current card design.
Monster Fluxx 1.1	2023	Reprint of Monster Fluxx in the standard box design.
Across America Fluxx	March 3, 2023	
Around the World Fluxx	May 5, 2023	
Camping Fluxx	February 2, 2024	
Hundred Acre Wood Fluxx	September 26, 2024	
Word Fluxx	March 23, 2025	
Mystery Fluxx	May 6, 2025	
Cat Fluxx	September 9, 2025	
Dog Fluxx	March 3, 2026	
Star Trek: Lower Decks Fluxx	October 20, 2026	

=== Languages ===
- Fluxx Spanish (Fluxx Español!; November 2006) Looney Labs, a 56 card set with 6 new Goals, a new Keeper and a new Rule
- German Fluxx first edition (2003; based on 3.0 card set) by Amigo Games
  - Second edition (March 2011; based on 4.0 card set) Pegasus Games
- Japanese Fluxx (based on 3.0 card set) HobbyJapan
- Dutch Fluxx (based on 5.0 card set) PS Games
- Portuguese EcoFluxx, released in Brazil
- Italian, released in Italy

Many of the versions can be combined with each other to make a "mega Fluxx" deck (as all these versions have the same card back style).

=== Expansions ===
Several expansions have been produced, including:

- Flowers and (a gift set with a "bouquet" of six plush "Happy Flowers", a Fluxx 3.0 deck and an exclusive "Flowers" promo Keeper card)
- Fluxx Blanxx, a set of blank cards for creating one's own custom additions (see above).
  - 2nd edition - begins formatted fronts while including the Chrononauts Beatles Reunion CD card
  - 3rd edition - adds Creeper blanks while removing the Chrononauts card
- Jewish
- Christian
- Castle Expansion Cards (May 2009 for Monty Python Fluxx
- 7 Cards From the Future (a 7-card set for Regular Show Fluxx)
- International Tabletop Day Expansion: Wil Wheaton and Felicia Day Fluxx Promo Packs (April 11, 2015)
- Fluxx Dice (September 2015)
- Star Trek Fluxx Bridge Expansion (August 2018) used to play both Star Trek & Star Trek TNG Fluxx together at the same time
- Firefly Fluxx Upgrade Pack (August 2018) 10 card pack includes Jubal Early, Hands of Blue, upgraded Reavers and Yolanda (aka Saffron, aka Bridgett)
- Black Knight Expansion (August 2018) a 10 card pack including the Black Knight as a Creeper, also Tim the Enchanter, new rules and a new Quest
- Fluxx Creeper Pack (August 2018) To bring back the Creepers dropped for edition 5, War, Death, Taxes, and Radioactive Potato with Goals, Actions and New Rules
- The Doctor Who Fluxx 13th Doctor Pack (Mid-year 2019)
- More Surprises Fluxx Expansion (July 2022), which contains 10 new surprise cards
- More Actions Fluxx Expansion (July 2022), which contains 10 new action cards
- More Rules Fluxx Expansion (July 2022), which contains 13 new rule cards (10 new rules and 3 meta rules)

==== Board game ====
Fluxx: The Board Game
- Publication: August 2013; 13 years ago
- Players: 2-4
- Playing time: 15 to 30 minutes

Fluxx: The Board Game is a board game implementation of the card game released in August 2013. This game was awarded the Parents' Choice Recommended Seal Fall 2013 for Games. Parents' Choice Recommended Seal Fall 2013 Games

The game moves the Keeper card items to spaces on the board while adding the "Leaper" card type. The board is separated into 9 movable tiles with four spaces each except for the start tile with the initial set up of 3x3 square. Besides the Keeper spaces there are 1 octagon space per title and two teleport spaces for the whole board. Moving on to one teleport space allows the player to move to the other teleport space. The octagon may hold any number of pawns while the keeper spaces can only have one with an incoming pawn pushing out the current pawn. There are two peg boards that track, the number of goals needed to win and current rules.

All start with a hand of three cards and a color card in face up to indicate the pawns they control. They each get to make a free rule change. New general rules affecting the tiles include rotation, moving and allowing wraparound tile movement. The game only has Action, Goals, New Rules and Leaper type cards. Action cards can change force a change in player color. A Leaper card counts as a card play but allows you to move a pawn to the item on the board. Goals cards are stacked near the board with top most card the current goal.

=== Promotional cards ===
Looney Labs gives away promotional cards related to Fluxx at conventions such as Gen Con and Origins. They have given away cards such as Composting and Jackpot, which later appeared in EcoFluxx and Family Fluxx respectively. They have also given away promo cards for Christmas to members of their online mailing list and in High Times magazine. Game Technicians (previously known as Mad Lab Rabbits), voluntary game demonstrators for Looney Labs, give away promo cards to people interested in the game.

- Origins 2000 Goal promo 5 card pack.
- Sir Not Appearing In This Game! (May 2009) for Monty Python Fluxx & its Castle expansion
- Traitor, a Creeper promo card June 2009) issued for the release of another Looney game, Are You The Traitor?
- Wizard of Oz song promotional card
- "Mrs. Claus" promotional card in Holiday Fluxx store launch kit
- "Skullduggery" promo card (February 11, 2011) Pirate store launch kit
- "The Alliance" card (January 15, 2016) Firefly store launch

=== Online ===
Fluxx was available to play for free via the Volity network and was also available to be played online via the CCG Workshop, using the gatlingEngine to adjudicate most of its rules automatically. However, both Volity.net and CCG Workshop are no longer operating.

In December 2012, Fluxx was released by Playdek as an app on iOS operating systems (iPhone, iPad, iPod Touch, Apple TV) by purchasing it from the Apple App Store. It uses the "mass market" deck developed for Target Stores, removing some of the more esoteric themes (such as Cthulhu) and complex rule cards.

== Reception ==
The base game won the Mensa Select Game Award in 1999. Rick Loomis comments: "Fluxx makes a good game for a group that has one of those annoying 'I-must-win-every-game' types. The rest of you can enjoy yourselves as the game spins out of his control (as it surely will) and perhaps he'll eventually learn to lose gracefully. Meanwhile, Fluxx will be busily exercising everyone's logic synapses as you attempt to deal with the chaotic situations that occur because of the cheerful clash of rules."

An ICv2 review of the Batman variant by Nick Smith gave it 4 out of 5 stars as "The Fluxx series of games is not for everyone." But the game worked well with the Batman theme: "The game-themed victory conditions are good, and the thematic elements were very well thought out. This may be the best-designed Fluxx set in some time, and it can be a lot of fun for casual fans to try to achieve the thematic victory conditions."

In a review of Fluxx in Black Gate, M Harold Page said "Playability-wise, the rules are on the cards themselves. Complex though play can be, playing the game is simple. My 7-year old manages fine with a little help to start her off, and my 11-year-old has sessions with his friends."

== Reviews ==
- Pyramid - 3.0
- Scrye

== See also ==
- 1000 Blank White Cards
- Looney Labs
- Aquarius (game)
- Chrononauts (game)
- Mao (card game), another card game with changing rules
- Nomic
- Treehouse (game)
- Icehouse pieces
