= Zero Zero (video game) =

1997 point-and-click video game

- Developer: Nicholson New York
- Publisher: Magnet Interactive Studios
- Designers: Theresa Duncan; Jeremy Blake
- Platforms: Windows, Macintosh
- Genre: Adventure
- Mode: Single-player

Zero Zero is a 1997 video game developed by Nicholson New York for Microsoft Windows and Macintosh. It is the last of three educational video game titles developed by Theresa Duncan. Upon release, critics praised Zero Zero for its unique premise, whilst considering some aspects of the game could be too esoteric for children.

== Gameplay ==
Players assume the role of a chimney sweep and acrobat named Pinkee LeBrun, who wanders the night in Paris close to midnight on 31 December 1899, as she and the characters she meets wonder what the coming century will bring. Using point and click controls using the computer mouse, players navigate a streetscape as the main menu, and explore interactive locations including the catacombs, a Parisian bakery, a toy store and wax museum.

== Development ==
The game was the third and last installment of three titles developed by Theresa Duncan, following the 1995 Chop Suey and 1996 Smartypants. The game was narrated by Mary Louise Wilson, and featured music from members of Fugazi. The game was only available via mail order.

== Reception ==
Reception

Review scores
Publication	Score
The Chicago Tribune	4/5
Entertainment Weekly	B
SuperKids	4.5/5

Several critics praised Zero Zero for its uniqueness and original premise. The Chicago Tribune considered the music of Zero Zero, its "fabulous" graphics, historical and cultural references, and "exuberant spirit" of the game's protagonist would "open minds and inspire questions" from younger players. Entertainment Weekly wrote the game was "richly-inspired" and an alternative source of entertainment for children against mainstream trends, but felt the game was "a little out-there, even for Duncan" and some of the music was "off-puttingly strange". Animation World felt the game had "limited but charming" animation. Some critics considered that aspects of the game could be too obscure for children to appreciate; Superkids wrote that whilst children enjoyed the offbeat nature of the game, at times they found it boring or "overly esoteric" and unable to understand some of the language, innuendo and jokes in the game.

In a retrospective of Theresa Duncan's work, Emilie Reed of Arcade Review stated that the game differed from Duncan's other titles with a "more muted" color palette and more concrete historical setting, whilst explicitly developing a theme of looking towards the future present in her earlier work.
