= Icehouse: The Martian Chess Set =

Abstract tabletop game using plastic pyramids

- Original edition box, 1999
- Designers: Andy Looney
- Publishers: Looney Labs
- Publication: 1999
- Genres: Abstract strategy

Icehouse: The Martian Chess Set is an abstract tabletop game published by Looney Labs in 1999 that uses a variety of plastic pyramids in a chess-like fashion.

== Gameplay ==
Icehouse: The Martian Chess Set is a set of playing pieces that can be utilized in abstract strategy games. The game comes with 60 pyramids and the rules for Martian Chess and three other abstract games.

In Martian Chess, a game for either 2 or 4 players, each player starts with a set of pyramids in three sizes. The largest move like chess queens, the medium move like chess rooks except they can only move one or two squares at a time, and the smallest move one square diagonally.

Each player controls one quarter of a chess board (4 players) or half of a chess board (2 players). The objective is not to subjugate the other players but to accumulate points by capturing pieces: the largest are worth 3 points, the medium pieces are worth 2, and the smallest pieces are worth 1. A player only controls pieces on their part of the board. To capture a piece, they must move one of their pieces onto an opposing player's quadrant, but after the capture, the piece they moved is now on the opponent's territory and now belongs to the opponent. In an interview, game designer Andy Looney noted, "Teach a Chess fan to play Martian Chess and get ready to watch his head explode. It's just enough like Earth Chess to seem familiar, but at the same time it's so different that you have to abandon your previous ways of thinking about the game. Everyone starts with a random assortment of colors, because color is meaningless — it's where the pieces are on the board that matters."

=== Victory conditions ===
The game ends when a player cannot make a legal move, usually because they have no more pieces. Players add up their point totals from captured pieces, and the largest total wins. Martin Rodeffer pointed out, "if you are ahead, shifting pieces into the opposing camp as quickly as possible is an effective endgame strategy since the game ends as soon as you cannot move."

== Publication history ==
In 1987 Andy Looney penned a sci-fi short story, "The Empty City", that included a game called Icehouse, an ancient Martian game. Readers wanted to learn how to play the game, and Looney responded by co-creating (with his future wife Kristin Wunderlich and John Cooper) actual rules, then plastic pyramid pieces to play the game. The first commercially available sets of pyramids were released in 1989 by their new company Icehouse Games. In 1996, Looney shut down Icehouse Games and started Looney Labs. The game Icehouse: The Martian Chess Set was released in 1999. By 2005, games stores were balking at selling the box of pyramids, and Looney Labs responded by relaunching the concept as a small tube of pyramids dedicated to only one game, TreeHouse.

== Reception ==
In Issue 13 of Abstract Games, Clark Rodeffer warned "Play of this game can be very confusing initially. One is apt to forget that a piece moved over to the other side to effect a capture may simply move straight back to recapture." Despite this, Rodeffer concluded, "Martian Chess is a mind-bending game... it is certainly an original game with novel tactics and strategy. Greater familiarity with the game would obviously help us to over come the disorientation!"

The reviewer from the online second volume of Pyramid stated that "Each of these games capitalizes on the unique nature of the Icehouse playing pieces to create unique and clever board games."

== Awards ==
At the 2000 Origins Awards, Icehouse: The Martian Chess Set won in the category "Best Abstract Board Game".

== See also ==
- Icehouse pieces
- Martian Chess
