= Top Jimmy & The Rhythm Pigs =

American rock and R&B band

Top Jimmy & The Rhythm Pigs were an American rock and R&B band that emerged from the Los Angeles punk/roots music scene of the late 1970s and early to mid-1980s. Music writer Chris Morris dubbed them "L.A. punk's house band." This scene also produced bands such as The Blasters, X, Los Lobos, The Gun Club, The Knitters, The Circle Jerks, and The Plugz.

== History ==
Top Jimmy (born James Paul Koncek; died May 17, 2001) was a Kentucky native who moved to Tacoma, Washington, in his youth. He relocated to Los Angeles at age 15 in November 1970 — rejoining his mother, who'd moved to L.A. while Jimmy was serving a stretch in a juvenile institution. His first friend in his new home was the guitarist who later became known as Billy Zoom.

He got his nickname from working — and providing handouts — at a fast-food stand called "Top Taco", located across the street from the A&M Records studios in Hollywood.

Jimmy began playing out in 1979, with makeshift bands often billed as "Top Jimmy and the All-Drunk All-Stars". The film The Decline of Western Civilization was shot around that time, and Jimmy is seen and heard while receiving a tattoo from John Doe of X. At some point, while still working at Top Taco, he got a job as a part-time roadie for X in that band's early days. At the end of a soundcheck, Jimmy sang a version of "Roadhouse Blues" by the Doors. That got the attention of the band and Doors member Ray Manzarek, who was then X's producer. In 1980, backed by the surviving members of The Doors, including Manzarek, Jimmy sang "Roadhouse Blues" at a special event. That was the publication party for the Jim Morrison biography, No One Here Gets Out Alive, at the Whisky a Go Go. Jimmy also performed the song in X concerts as an encore. One such occasion came in 1981, with Manzarek playing too, at L.A.'s Greek Theatre.

Chris Morris described Jimmy's voice as "big, deep, raw, and thoroughly unmannered." He'd previously compared the "leather-voiced shouter" to Howlin' Wolf in Make The Music Go Bang!, a chronicle of the early L.A. punk scene. A 1984 article had described Jimmy as a cross between Wolf and Sir John Falstaff.

=== Formation of band / heyday ===
Top Jimmy & The Rhythm Pigs began to form around 1980. They played at numerous area clubs but their gigs at one place in particular gained attention. Starting around August 1981, they had a residency playing "Blue Mondays" every Monday night at the Cathay de Grande nightclub at the corner of Argyle and Selma in Hollywood, California. They became an important part of the Los Angeles rock scene.

Live, the lineup usually consisted of:

- Top Jimmy (James Paul Koncek): vocals
- Carlos Guitarlos (Carlos Ayala): lead guitar and vocals
- Gil T. (Gilbert Isais): bass and vocals
- Dig The Pig (Richard "Dick" Aeilts): rhythm guitar
- Joey Morales: drums
- Steve Berlin: saxophone
- Tom Fabre: saxophonist (part-time)

Top Jimmy & The Rhythm Pigs concerts often featured guest appearances by such artists as Tom Waits and Stevie Ray Vaughan. According to the Waits biography Lowside of the Road, Waits was influenced by the L.A. roots-rock scene but particularly loved the Pigs. He also formed a personal connection with Jimmy.

Also joining at various times were Albert Collins, Bonnie Bramlett, and Percy Mayfield. In addition, the club included members of the aforementioned scene stalwarts, most notably X and The Blasters.

Chris Morris described the "Blue Mondays" as "an infernal scene" that drew a hard-drinking crowd, and the band matched the audience's consumption. Fisticuffs were common, especially with the short-tempered Carlos Guitarlos. Yet the shows were mainly about dancing and having a good time.

Another admirer and Cathay guest star was David Lee Roth of Van Halen. Thanks to Roth, the band and its frontman in particular were saluted in the song "Top Jimmy" on the album 1984. Roth frequented the Zero Zero club, where Jimmy tended bar. According to Jimmy, he and Roth had discussed working on an album of country tunes together, but that idea appears never to have gone anywhere.

=== Dissolution ===
The residency at the Cathay ended when proprietor Michael Brennan shut down the club in 1985. Top Jimmy & The Rhythm Pigs remained visible for a time at another L.A. club, Raji's. They also continued to play dates at other spots in the area, such as the Palomino Club, as seen in the fall of 1987.

By that time, Steve Berlin was long gone. Gil T. had joined Dave Alvin's Guilty Men in 1986. The "increasingly erratic" Carlos Guitarlos left for the Bay Area in 1988.

The band never went beyond local-hero status for several reasons: internal volatility, absence of discipline, no new material, and substance abuse.

=== Album: Pigus Drunkus Maximus ===
This, the band's first and only record, was recorded in 1981 but released in 1987 — after the group had begun to crumble. It got its belated issue on Down There Records, a label run by another L.A. musician, Steve Wynn. The album also bore the logo of Restless Records, then a division of Enigma Records. In its original incarnation, it was available on vinyl and cassette but not on CD.

D.J. Bonebrake of X and Tony Morales contributed drum parts, so Joey Morales played harmonica. Gene Taylor added piano. Steve Berlin was producer. Colorful liner notes came from Chris Morris.

The back cover said, "The album you hold in your hands contains songs either written by or associated with Merle Haggard, Otis Rush, Johnny Paycheck, Bob Dylan, The Coasters, Jimi Hendrix and Howlin' Wolf." Of the 11 tracks, the only three originals were contributed by Carlos Guitarlos: "Dance with Your Baby", "Hole in My Pocket", and the instrumental "Backroom Blues".

In its writeup, Trouser Press cited the LP's "enthusiastic sweaty abandon."

In November 2025, it was announced that Pigus Drunkus Maximus would at long last be reissued (on East of Lincoln Productions/Blind Owl Records #EOL-CD1 [UPC: 085218116927]). For the first time ever, it will be available on CD, as well as "pig pink" colored vinyl, in a gatefold sleeve featuring a 16-page booklet of archival photos by photographer Gary Leonard, along with new liner notes by Chris Morris.

=== Subsequent recordings by Top Jimmy ===
Long Distance Call by a group billed as 'The Top Jimmy Lineup' came out in 1994 on a small independent label called Little Village. It was produced by John Doe. The bass player was John Bazz of The Blasters.

The Good Times Are Killing Me came out in 1996 on another small label called T.O.N. Records. It was credited just to just 'Top Jimmy'. John Bazz and Evan Johns were among the musicians credited.

Jimmy contributed vocals to "Mr. Satellite Man" on Phil Alvin's 1994 solo album County Fair 2000. He also performed T-Bone Walker's "Mean Old World" on the 1990 Hightone compilation album L.A. Ya Ya.

=== Legacy ===
Koncek died on May 17, 2001 (aged 45–46), in Las Vegas, Nevada, from liver failure. Chris Morris wrote the obituary that appeared in L.A. Weekly.

Morris kept the memory of Top Jimmy and the Rhythm Pigs alive in another history of the L.A. punk scene, Under the Big Black Sun (2016). A follow-up book, More Fun in the New World (2019), went even deeper: three chapters were devoted expressly to Jimmy. The entry from Morris again compared him in voice and persona to Howlin' Wolf. John Doe and Billy Zoom also provided a wealth of anecdotes. Yet another contributor, Maria McKee, said in her chapter that when Jimmy asked her to sing with him on stage when she was just 16, it was a major turning point in her life.

When the Pigus Drunkus Maximus reissue was announced in November 2025, producer Steve Berlin remarked, "Beyond the value as a historical snapshot of the era, you’ll hear a band cranking on all cylinders."

The Van Halen song "Top Jimmy" from their diamond selling album 1984 was written as a homage to Koncek and mentions the full band name in its lyrics. Van Halen frontman David Lee Roth frequented the Zero Zero club where Koncek worked as bartender.
