= Beyond the Limit: Ultimate Climb =

1996 video game

- Developer: Magnet Interactive Studios
- Publisher: Microsoft
- Platform: Windows
- Release: 1996
- Genre: Simulation
- Mode: Single-player

Beyond the Limit: Ultimate Climb is a 1996 video game developed by Magnet Interactive Studios and published by Microsoft. It is a mountain climbing simulation video game targeted at younger players where the objective is to climb across mountain trails set across the world.

== Gameplay ==
Gameplay screenshot

Players navigate and climb across over 100 locations set in the southwest of North America, the Congo, the Himalays, the Arctic Circle and South America including deserts, mountain roads and traversing cliffs. Before starting a trail, players select available trails by navigating a 3D headquarters. They can select their character and assistant from two male and two female characters, with different levels of stamina, strength, and skill. Assistants provide the player with instructions as the player climbs. Players also put together equipment for their climb; these include food, water, lanterns, rope, spikes and other gear, as well as items that may be situationally useful if encountering an animal, such as a whistle. The backpack only has a limited number of slots, requiring players to collect and discard items throughout their journey. During the climb, players can choose different paths towards the goal of ascending the mountain. When players reach a cliff face, they vertically ascend by selecting crevices on the rock face and using spikes to secure themselves, whilst avoiding hazards such as falling boulders. Players may also encounter hazards such as wild animals that can end their climb. Completion of individual climbs and resolving hazards earns the player points, with harder routes earning more points; players are able to progress to the next stage if they reach the top of the highest peak with enough points.

== Development ==
Microsoft announced Beyond the Limit in July 1996 as part of its educational multimedia line-up for children, marketed for players ages 9 and up. The game uses full motion video for its climbers, which were filmed using actors at a studio in Los Angeles.

== Reception ==
Reception

Review score
Publication	Score
Tekno	65%

Praising the "unusual and unexpected" focus of the game, Paul Rosano of the Hartford Courant found the game straightforward to play and visually appealing, but performance could be slow. MicroTimes praised the game's characters for their humor, writing that they felt like "real people with their own individual characteristics". Initially dismissing the game as a "real dust collector", Bengt-Ake Olofsson of Tekno wrote that he found the charm of navigating routes and climbing rock faces, but felt the game was slow and the animations of the characters was awkward.
