= Playing With Pyramids =

Playing With Pyramids is a 2002 book published by Looney Labs.

== Contents ==
Playing With Pyramids is a book in which a collection features rules for 12 diverse abstract games using Icehouse pieces, ranging from logic and dexterity challenges to roll‑and‑move play, many created by fans and expanded online.

== Reviews ==
- Pyramid
- Abstract Games #13
