= Martian Chess =

Abstract strategy game

Martian chess
- Designers: Andrew Looney
- Publishers: Looney Labs
- Publication: 1999; 27 years ago
- Years active: 1999–present
- Genres: Tabletop game; Abstract strategy game
- Systems: Icehouse
- Players: 2 or 4
- Skills: Strategy, tactics
- Materials required: Icehouse pieces; chessboard
- Released in: Icehouse: The Martian Chess Set (1999); 3HOUSE (2007); Pyramid Primer No. 1; Pyramid Arcade (2016)
- Website: Official website

Martian Chess is an abstract strategy game for two or four players invented by Andrew Looney in 1999. It is played with Icehouse pyramids on a chessboard. To play with a number of players other than two or four, a non-Euclidean surface can be tiled to produce a board of the required size, allowing up to six players.

In his review in Abstract Games Magazine, Kerry Handscomb stated:

The first thing to note about Martian Chess is that it is not a chess-type game at all. Instead, the objective is to accumulate points by capturing pieces.

Martian Chess is [...] an original game with novel tactics and strategy.

In 1996, Looney had invented Monochrome Chess, a similar two-player game that uses regular chess pieces where the half of the board determined who controlled a piece. While the king is not royal, the king and rook can castle.

== History ==
Martian Chess was one of four games in the Icehouse: The Martian Chess Set released by Looney Labs in 1999. The set was Looney Labs's first Icehouse release and first to showcase its potential as a game system. The other three games were IceTowers, IceTraders and Zarcana. In 2001, Icehouse: The Martian Chess Set won the Origins Award for Best Abstract Board Game of 2000. The rules to the game were reissued in 3HOUSE booklet in 2007, again by 2013 in Pyramid Primer No. 1 and in 2016 as a part of Pyramid Arcade boxed set.

== Rules ==
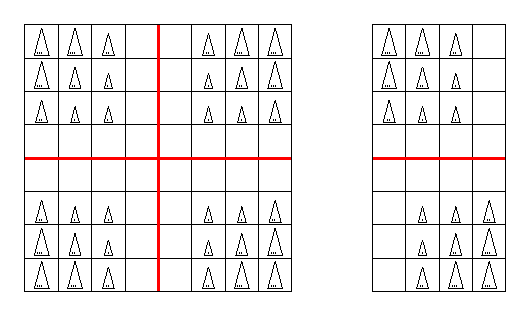
Four-player and two-player starting setups

=== Initial setup ===
Each player starts with nine pieces: three small (pawns), three medium (drones), and three large (queens). The color of the pieces is irrelevant to the gameplay. A mix of colors is recommended.

Players initially place their pieces in the corners of the board as shown. In a two-player game, only a half-board is used. The players decide who moves first. Play turns alternate, and pass to the left after each move.

=== Movement and capturing ===
The red lines in the diagrams indicate notional canals which divide the board into territories, or quadrant. At any given time a player controls only those pieces that are in their territory.

The pieces move as follows:

- Pawns: one space diagonally in any direction. (Unlike chess pawns, they may move backwards.)
- Drones: one or two spaces horizontally or vertically, without jumping. (Like chess rooks, but with limited range.)
- Queens: any distance horizontally, vertically, or diagonally, without jumping. (The same as chess queens.)

As in chess, a square may contain no more than one piece, and a piece is captured when an enemy piece lands on the square it occupies. The capturing player removes the piece and puts it aside for later scoring.

In the two-player game, a player may not immediately reverse an opponent's last move (i.e. may not move the piece across the canal back to its departure square, on the next turn).

=== End of game and scoring ===
The game ends when one player runs out of pieces (i.e., their territory becomes empty). Players then compute their scores by adding up the point values of the pieces they captured: queen = 3, drone = 2, pawn = 1. The player or team with the highest total wins the game.

In the four-player game, the players form two teams, with teammates in opposite corners. Teammates play for a combined score. Aside from strategic differences, play is unaffected; it is legal (and sometimes good strategy) to capture your teammate's pieces.

== Strategy ==
Capturing with a queen often allows the opponent to immediately recapture, leading to a back-and-forth battle until one player runs out of pieces in the line(s) of capture. This is more common in two-player games, since other players may interfere in the four-player version. The net point difference is usually minor with two players, but can give the players involved a significant lead over the others in a four-player game.

Moving a pawn or drone into enemy territory can be a good move for several reasons, it can:

- prevent an opponent from capturing the piece from you
- ensure the availability of a piece to capture from an opponent
- block an attack from an enemy queen or drone

== See also ==
- Icehouse pieces
- Looney Labs
