= The Space Under the Window =

1997 interactive fiction game by Andrew Plotkin

The Space Under the Window is a 1997 interactive fiction game by Andrew Plotkin. The game is part of a collaborative art piece, also entitled The Space Under the Window, by Kristin Looney – each piece had to have this title, but was otherwise unconstrained.

This game uses an entirely different structure than that of traditional IF, veering away from score-based puzzles and one set goal. At the beginning, a short descriptive scene is displayed. Instead of entering commands, the player selects one of the words from the text, and the scene is altered - often subtly, for example, an addition of a few words or a shift in atmosphere. There are multiple paths along the narrative, and several endings ranging in mood.

The Space Under the Window was a finalist in the 1997 XYZZY Awards for Best Use of Medium and Best Writing. It has inspired parodies such as The Chicken Under The Window by Lucian P. Smith, at ChickenComp 1998.
