= Monica Gesue =

American writer and illustrator

- Occupations: Writer and illustrator

Monica Gesue is an American writer and illustrator best known for her work with Theresa Duncan on the 1995 video game Chop Suey.

== Illustrated works ==
- Chop Suey (1995)
- The Amazing Days of Abby Hayes: Every Cloud Has a Silver Lining (2000)
- The Amazing Days of Abby Hayes: The Declaration of Independence (2000)
- Astrology Rules!: Every Girl's Dream Guide to Her Stars (2001)
- The Amazing Days of Abby Hayes: Have Wheels, Will Travel (2001)
- The Amazing Days of Abby Hayes: The Pen Is Mightier than the Sword (2001)
- The Amazing Days of Abby Hayes: Look Before You Leap (2001)
- The Amazing Days of Abby Hayes: Two Heads Are Better than One (2002)
- The Amazing Days of Abby Hayes: Everything Under the Sun (2003)
- The Amazing Days of Abby Hayes: Too Close for Comfort (2003)
- DIY Girl (2003)
- The Amazing Days of Abby Hayes: Good Things Come in Small Packages (2004)
- A Good Sport (2013)
