= Behind the Wall of Sleep =

Behind the Wall of Sleep may refer to:

- Behind the Wall of Sleep (EP), a 1994 EP by Macabre
- "Behind the Wall of Sleep" (The Smithereens song), 1986
- "Behind the Wall of Sleep", a song from Black Sabbath's 1970 album Black Sabbath

== See also ==
- Beyond the Wall of Sleep (disambiguation)
