= Cosmic Coasters =

Board game

- Designers: Andrew Looney
- Publishers: Looney Labs
- Players: 2-4
- Setup time: 1-2 minutes
- Playing time: 10 minutes
- Chance: Medium
- Skills: Strategic thought

Cosmic Coasters is a board game designed by Andrew Looney and published by Looney Labs. In 2002, Cosmic Coasters won the Origins Award for Best Abstract Board Game of 2001.

The game is played on custom bar coasters bearing the image of a Galilean moon on one side and a rules summary on the other. The coasters are designed for use as actual coasters as well as game boards, and the game does not use anything unlikely to be in a bar (such as dice).

== Gameplay ==
Each coaster represents a space colony with four "factories", four "control points" and one "teleporter". Each player takes seven distinctive counters - for example, coins of the same denomination - and places them on their coaster.

Players take turns to move. Each turn, they may Teleport, Build, or Move.

Teleport
So long as a player is the only player to control (have a counter on) two or more of the control points on a coaster, they may teleport a counter from that coaster's teleporter onto another coaster, or out of the game. If they teleport onto another counter, that counter is destroyed.
Build
So long as a player controls the two control points adjacent to an empty factory, and they have spare counters, they may put one of their spare counters on that factory.
Move
The player may move one of their counters to an adjacent space. If the space is occupied, attacker and defender play one round of "Rock, Paper, Scissors" to determine the outcome:
- Attacker wins - The defender is removed and the attacker moves into the space.
- Tie - The defender is removed but the attacker does not move into the space.
- Defender wins - The defender is not removed and the attacker does not move into the space. The turn is wasted.

Each player has a special power, depending on their coaster. The first player to teleport a counter back onto their own coaster wins.

== Reviews ==
- Pyramid
