= Cathay de Grande =

Nightclub and Chinese restaurant in Hollywood, Los Angeles

Coordinates: 34°6′0″N 118°19′30″W

- Address: 1600 Argyle Ave. Los Angeles; USA

Construction
- Opened: 1973
- Closed: 1985

The Cathay de Grande was a Chinese restaurant and later a Hollywood nightclub of the same name that featured mostly punk rock bands but also other styles of underground/alternative rock in the 1980s.

== History ==
Under the ownership of Jack Chen, the Cathay de Grande restaurant and its underground basement nightclub opened in December 1973, serving Mandarin cuisine. By 1980, new owner Michael Brennan had taken over, serving Thai food and booking punk and New Wave bands such as the Raybeats, Angry Samoans, the Flesh Eaters, and the Gun Club.

== Notable acts ==
Red Hot Chili Peppers performed their very first show under that band name at the Cathay after going by the name Tony Flow and the Miraculously Majestic Masters of Mayhem for their two previous performances at another Hollywood club. They would play the Cathay a few times during their first tour in 1983 and once in 1984.

Other bands who frequently played the Cathay included The Minutemen, Bad Religion, Tex and the Horseheads, Geza X and the Mommymen, Dr. Know, The WILD, Entropy, along with regulars from Orange County Social Distortion, T.S.O.L., The Vandals, Agent Orange. and Love Canal. The Knitters played their first gig at the Cathay.

Starting around August 1981, Top Jimmy & The Rhythm Pigs had a residency playing "Blue Mondays" every Monday night.

The Replacements and Butthole Surfers were among the national touring bands who came through the venue.

== Closure and legacy ==
Due to ongoing problems with neighbors, intervention by the local police, and legal problems related to business conflicts, proprietor Michael Brennan closed the Cathay de Grande in 1985. It was one of the last remaining punk venues at the time of its closure. Violent Psychosis, The Mentors with El Duce, and Circle Jerks performed the venue's farewell show. Shortly before, Danny "Dobbs" Wilson, a booker at the Cathay de Grande, started Raji's a block to the north on Hollywood Boulevard.

The nightclub space later became home to the more upscale China Club.

In the song "The Desperation's Gone" from the NOFX album So Long And Thanks For All The Shoes, Fat Mike sings "Cathay de, I miss your smell."

In 2014, a nightclub called The Argyle opened at the location. That venue has since closed.
