= Beyond the Wall of Sleep (disambiguation) =

Beyond the Wall of Sleep is a short story by H.P. Lovecraft.

Beyond the Wall of Sleep may also refer to:

- Beyond the Wall of Sleep (collection), a collection of writings by Lovecraft
- Beyond the Wall of Sleep (album), a 2014 album by Christian Muenzner
- "Beyond the Wall of Sleep", a song by Sentenced from the 1993 album North from Here

== See also ==
- Behind the Wall of Sleep (disambiguation)
- Beyond the Wall (disambiguation)
