= Zombie Fluxx =

2007 card game

Zombie Fluxx is a 2007 card game published by Looney Labs.

== Gameplay ==
Zombie Fluxx is a version of Fluxx where the player has weapons and is able to kill things.

== Reception ==
The game was reviewed in the online second volume of Pyramid.

Zombie Fluxx won the 2007 Origins Award for Traditional Card Game of the Year.
