= Aquarius (game) =

- Players: 2–5
- Setup time: 2 minutes
- Playing time: 20–30 minutes
- Chance: Some
- Age range: First Edition: 5 and up Second Edition: 6 and up, with special "preschooler" rules for ages 3-6
- Skills: Strategy

Aquarius is a card game created by Andrew Looney and published by Looney Labs. The game play has some similarity to the game of dominoes. The card design and feel of the game is influenced by the Hippie movement and the art of Peter Max. The game has been released in two editions. The First Edition deck contained 5 Goal cards, 15 Action cards and 40 Element cards. The current Second Edition deck has 5 Goal cards, 18 Action cards, 55 Element cards and 1 "Wild" card.

== Rules and gameplay ==
Each player is dealt a hand of three cards, plus one of five Goal cards, depicting one of the five elements; Earth, Air, Fire, Water or Space (called "Ether" in the First Edition). Then one card is placed face up on the table to start the layout. The player with the longest hair goes first. The objective is to connect seven cards with your goal element. The goal cards are kept secret during the game play, so you must bluff and block the other players in order to win.

On your turn, you draw a card, then play a card next to one of the other cards in the layout in a standard grid-style format. You can only play a card if one or more elements on the new card touches the matching element on adjacent (not diagonal) cards.

The Element cards have one, two or four of the five elements displayed on them. In the First Edition game, the elements were laid out only in vertical or horizontal blocks. The Second Edition added 15 new two-Element cards with the blocks aligned diagonally (corner-to-corner).

Other cards in the deck allow you to swap Goals, or alter the layout in some way. These cards are known as "Action Cards". In the First Edition Game, there were 3 each of 5 different types of Action Cards:

- Trade Goals: This card allows you to switch Goal cards with the player of your choice.
- Shuffle Goals: This card allows you to gather up all of the goal cards, including those not in play, and deal a new one to each player.
- Trade Hands: This card allows you to swap hands with the player of your choice.
- Zap A Card: Select a card in play on the table, pick it up and place it in your hand. (When you use this card you are allowed to have 4 cards in your hand rather than the customary 3.)
- Move A Card: Select a card in play on the table and move it to a new legal location.

In the Second Edition, Shuffle Goals has been replaced by two new Action types (again, 3 of each in the deck):

- Rotate Goals: Players pass their Goal cards one player over in the direction chosen by the player playing the card.
- Shuffle Hands: The player playing the card gathers all the cards in the players' hands, shuffles them and redeals them evenly, starting with themselves.

Also in the Second Edition, special simplified "Preschooler" variant rules have been included at three levels of play:

- Elemental Connections: for ages 3–4; no Goal or Action cards used; last player to legally play a card wins.
- Basic Aquarius: for ages 5–6; no Action Cards used; play otherwise regular with suggested rule that anyone under age 7 need only match as many Element cards as their age.
- Single-Action/Reduced-Action Aquarius: for ages 6 and up; use only one type of Action card to start (Trade Goals is suggested); once players are familiar with that Action, future games gradually add additional Actions until all Action cards are in play.

== Expansions ==
Looney Labs has produced only one promo card for Aquarius, the Wild card. It behaves like a single panel card of all five elements at once. The Wild card was originally only available as part of the now out-of-print Nanoblanks expansion for Nanofictionary. The Second Edition game includes one Wild card in the regular set.

== Variants ==
Looney Labs has also licensed the Aquarius format to Covenant Communications, Inc. to produce a Mormon-themed version of the game called Search, Ponder & Play! Based on the First Edition of Aquarius, the five Elements in the regular game have been replaced with 5 photos representing Mormon concepts: the Old Testament, the New Testament, the Pearl of Great Price, Doctrine & Covenants, and the Book of Mormon. In addition, the 5 actions have been renamed (in order listed above) Swap, Stir, Shake, Fetch & Flip. The only major change to gameplay is the inclusion of a score pad and rules instructing the players to keep score through multiple rounds until someone wins with one of each of the five victory elements. The game is available through both Looney Labs' online store and through Covenant Communications' own site.
