= Chrononauts (game) =

Card game

The Card Game of Time Travel!
- Designers: Andrew Looney
- Publishers: Looney Labs
- Publication: 2000
- Years active: 2000–present
- Genres: sci fi
- Languages: en
- Players: 1–6
- Setup time: 5 minutes
- Playing time: 20–45 minutes
- Chance: Moderate
- Age range: 11 and up
- Skills: Strategy, collecting
- Media type: cards
- Website: Official website

Chrononauts is a family of card games that simulates popular fictional ideas about how time travellers might alter history, drawing on sources like Back to the Future and the short stories collection Travels Through Time. The game was designed by Andrew Looney and is published by Looney Labs. The original game and a variant each won the Origins Award for Best Traditional Card Game.

== History ==
The game was designed by Andrew Looney of Looney Labs in 2000. In 2001, Chrononauts won the Origins Award for Best Traditional Card Game of 2000 and Parents' Choice Silver Honors 2001 Games.

The game's first expansion, Lost Identities was released in 2001. In 2004, Looney Labs released Early American Chrononauts (EAC), a prequel version of Chrononauts, and introduced "Gadgets," a new card type.

The game's second edition was published in 2009. The Gore Years expansion set was issued that year also. Released on September 11, 2010, Back to the Future: The Card Game variant re-implemented the system to match the movies. This variant won 2011 Origins Award for Best Traditional Card Game. In 2013, EAC was reprinted.

A second expansion set The Rest of Row E Expansion was released in 2024.

== Gameplay ==
Chrononauts is played with a specially designed set of 136 (in the Third Printing) or 140 cards (in version 1.4). There are 32 Timeline cards that form the game board (with four tiers of eight cards), plus ID and Mission cards describe goals for the players, and 80-84 Chrononauts cards providing Artifacts, Actions, Gadgets, Inverters, Patches, and Timewarps, making up the deck from which players draw. Gadgets were added with the Early American Chrononauts variant and grant special actions.

The 32 timeline cards represent significant events in (real) history of two types: Linchpins and Ripple Points. Players use Inverters to directly change the Linchpin events, changing to the alternative event on the reverse side of the timeline card. Changing a Linchpin also turns over one or more Ripple Point cards, exposing paradoxes. Player can use a Patch to resolve the paradox. The timeline mechanic with linchpins and ripple points was patented by Looney in 2002.

The game can be won in one of three ways:

1. Return Home: The timeline can be altered so that certain events happen as described on a player's ID card and involves 2 patches and one linchpin.
2. Complete the Mission: Each player has a Mission card detailing a set of Artifacts that can be retrieved through time travel. If a player collects all three artifacts that meet the mission conditions by the end of their turn, the player gets paid off by a rich eccentric and is able to retire.
3. Become a Time Enforcer: Each time a player plays a Patch, he/she immediately draws an extra card. A player whose hand contains 10 or more cards at the end of his/her turn gets recruited to protect the timeline.

If there are ever 13 or more unpatched paradoxes on the timeline, then the universe is destroyed and all players lose.

The game comes with two other game rules, Solonauts (a solitaire version) and Artifaxx (a Fluxx-like variant). The Chrononauts and EAC timelines can be interconnected to create a third game, ÜberChrononauts, which requires players to satisfy all three winning conditions, although not simultaneously, to win the game. The original Über rules were found in the EAC set on a card, with updated rules on Wunderland.com.

=== Back to the Future ===
Back to the Future: The Card Game (BttF) comes with 100 cards of which there are 24 Timeline cards, 10 ID cards and the rest game cards. The game cards consist of items, time machines, doubleback, action and power action cards. Similar to Chrononauts, BttF lays out the timeline cards on the table to make a board with each era in the movies group together. Each player randomly gets an ID card which gives goals, or timeline changes need to make sure that future character exists. To lock in the goal and win, the player must go back in time and stop Doc Brown from inventing time travel. The license for this game expired in 2012 and it is no longer being produced.

== Sets ==
Chrononauts

- Original timeline (1865 – 1999)
  - 1st edition (2000) time travel themed card game designed by Andrew Looney (136 cards)
  - 2nd printing (2002) included minor changes to several cards (136 cards)
  - 3rd printing (2004) removed some duplicated cards, added two Artifacts and two Gadgets (136 cards)
  - Version 1.4 (2009) included a new box, an updated rule sheet, edits to support ÜberChrononauts, and a four additional cards (140 cards)
  - Version 1.5 (2013) made minor changes to the box (140 cards)
  - Version 1.6 (2024) taller box to accommodate expansions (140 cards)
- Early American Chrononauts timeline (1770 – 1916)
  - 1st edition (2004) a prequel using the same game mechanics and introduces Gadgets, a new card type to affect gameplay (136 cards)
  - Version 1.1 (2013) new box style and added four Gold Watch cards for use in ÜberChrononauts along with an updated rule sheet (140 cards)
- Expansion packs
  - Lost Identities (2001) a set of 13 new IDs and one new Mission ("The Most Toys") for Chrononauts (14 cards). Most of the new IDs were created by fans of the game via a submission contest held on Looney Labs' website.
  - The Gore Years (2009) expands timeline from 2000 to 2008 and adds several IDs and patches (11 cards). Reprinted in 2018 with new packaging.
  - Missing Artifacts (2022) a set of nine new Artifacts and six new Missions, along with two new Gadgets and a new Action (18 cards) for Chrononauts or Early American Chrononauts.
  - The Rest of Row E (2023) expands the timeline from 2008 to 2022 and adds four IDs and one patch (10 cards).
- Promo cards
  - Beatles Reunion Album (2001) included with Fluxx Blanxx and later added to Chrononauts Version 1.4
  - Jade Statue of Tirade (2001) later added to Chrononauts third printing
  - German Chocolate Cake (2002) later added to Chrononauts third printing
  - Really Fast Time Machine (2004) later added to Chrononauts third printing
  - Teeny Tiny Time Machine (2004) later added to Chrononauts third printing
  - Carl Sagan's Joint (2004) for Chrononauts or Early American Chrononauts
  - Mating Pair of Pterodactyls (2004) Chrononauts or Early American Chrononauts
  - Gold Watch (2005) for ÜberChrononauts, later added to Early American Chrononauts Version 1.1
  - Live Woolly Mammoth (2013) for Chrononauts or Early American Chrononauts, included in Mammoth Fun Pack
  - Martha Washington's Great Cake (2014) for Early American Chrononauts, included in Fruitcake Fun Pack
  - Stonehenge 3-Pack (2022) for Chrononauts or Early American Chrononauts

Themed versions

- Back to the Future: The Card Game (2010) art by Derek Ring, won 2011 Origins Award for Best Traditional Card Game (100 cards)
  - Pizza Hydrator promo card on a postcard
- Star Trek Chrono-Trek (2019) art by Derek Ring (172 cards)

== Reception ==
version	BGG average rating (as of July 23, 2021)
Chrononauts	6.194 (of 10)
EAC	6.601
Lost Identities	6.727
The Gore Years	6.538
Back to the Future	5.807
Star Trek Chrono-Trek	6.504

The reviews of Chrononauts lean towards the positive. Gamers at BoardGameGeek.com gave the game an average rating of 6.23 (out of 10) as of March 22, 2016. Out of the Box columnist Kenneth Hite wrote:

And I do love all that, but the game itself needs more of the first part and less of the 'scavenger hunt through time' aspect that unfortunately dominates game play — the various victory conditions are mechanically unbalanced, leading to a de-emphasis of the time changing mechanic that is Looney's best idea for this game.

Spotlight on Games' 1001 Nights of Gaming review sub-site gave the game a personal rating of 6 as it has some well designed ID goals while others are "poorly integrated" and considered the draw-discard turn and wait to be "hardly edifying".

The cards do have a lot of nice thematic information however and the design of the various events and alternate realities must have been a labor of love. It's just too bad that the same kind of ingenuity wasn't put into the game play. As a two-player game this works somewhat, but tends to be better with more as otherwise it can degenerate into long sequences of simply reversing the other's move.

At Board Game Quest, Tony Mastrangeli found that "Explaining the linchpin/ripple point mechanic takes some work" and "There aren't many time travel games out there for some reason, but Chrononauts is probably one of my favorites. It's easy to learn, plays quickly, very portable and really inexpensive." Mastrangeli gave it 3 or 5 stars, calling it "A fun card game that has a great theme and is on the meatier side of the filler game category".

Reviewing version 1.4 with "The Gore Years" expansion, Jonathan H. Liu of GeekDad said, "If you like the idea of time travel, Chrononauts is a fun way to play with it". Liu doesn't recommend the Artifaxx variant rule set except for younger players. Also reviewing the game with the Gore expansion, Meople's Magazine rated the game over all a 7. Brian Thomas Clements reviewed "The Gore Years" expansion by itself at Gamerati. He had mostly praise for the new timeline except for an out of step patch card regarding Sarah Palin's rise to the national stage. Clements stated, "...Chrononauts: The Gore Years is a great addition to Chrononauts. It continues the historical trends of the previous game smoothly and logically (mostly), and can be easily integrated into the original game and ÜberChrononauts as well." He expects future expansions.

Early American version's average rating at Board Game Geek.com is 6.63 as of March 22, 2016. Spotlight on Games' 1001 Nights of Gaming review sub-site gave EAC a personal rating of 6 and indicated a problem with the new gadget card: "This is not so much a problem in the runaway leader sense as collecting three artifacts still seems the easiest way to win, but it can mean that this player's turn starts to become very complicated and long, increasing downtime for others." Brad Weier posted a comped playtest review of the EAC version at RPG.net in which he considered its style to be "Classy & Well Done" (4) and its substance to be "Meaty" (4). He also summarized, "Like all of Looney Labs card games, EAC combines simple rules and fairly chaotic play into a fun and humorous package."

Back to the Future got a positive review from Jonathan H. Liu of GeekDad in which he states, "Personally, I'm a fan of a lot of the Looney Labs games, and this one has a similar feel so I enjoyed it." Liu considered that the game is weak with 2 players.

List of awards and nominations
Version	Award	Category	Result
Chrononauts (first edition)	Origins Award 2000	Best Traditional Card Game	Won
Chrononauts (first edition)	Parents' Choice Spring 2001	Games	Silver Honors
Back to the Future	Origins Award 2011	Best Traditional Card Game	Won

== Reviews ==
- Pyramid
