= Are You a Werewolf? =

Card game

Are you a Werewolf?
- Players: 5 or more; recommended, 10 or more
- Setup time: < 5 minutes
- Playing time: 5–30 minutes per round
- Chance: Low
- Age range: 5+
- Skills: Strategic thought Team play Roleplay

Are You a Werewolf?, or simply Werewolf, is a party game from Looney Labs. Its gameplay is derived from the game Mafia.

The game does not require special equipment; a deck of playing cards can also be used; any regular playing cards can be used, though Looney Labs does have a specialized deck for sale.

== Gameplay ==
The game starts with the Moderator handing each player a card. Players play out the role given to them by the card:

- Villager: All but three players will be villagers. Villagers have no special role in the game.
- Werewolf: Two players will be werewolves.
- Seer: One player will be the seer.

Until a player is eliminated, players are not to reveal their identity as printed on the card. Players may lie about what's on their card. When a player is killed, their card is revealed.

The game starts at night. All players close their eyes (often also bending their heads forwards) and make noise, usually clapping hands or slapping thighs to cover any unintentional noises that could disclose information. The moderator summons their werewolves awake, and asks them to make a selection of a villager to die. They then close their eyes, and the Seer is summoned to make a selection of a player to determine if s/he is a werewolf. The moderator will gesture with a thumbs-up for yes and thumbs-down for no.

After the first night has ended, the moderator describes a calamity as having befallen their town. Many narrators choose to ham it up, especially during pick-up games at game conventions.

Night may be accompanied by players tapping gently to mask sounds made by gesturing.

After the night, the day portion begins with the unfortunate demise of a villager, and debate about who in the group is a werewolf. The day ends when a simple majority of players select another player to be eliminated. Play then repeats unless a victory condition is met.

According to some rules, the role of dead players should not be revealed; according to others, if doctor dies, nobody should know that.

== Victory conditions ==
A game ends in one of two ways:

- Werewolves win if there is a one-to-one ratio of werewolves and villagers.
- Villagers win if they manage to kill both werewolves.

== Psychology of the game ==
The game displays many of the problems with mob mentality. With rare exceptions, villagers will end up killing at least one - and, more likely, several - villagers rather than the werewolves. Recriminations and accusations without cause are bandied about, and on occasion players are killed for the most trivial of reasons.

== Reviews ==
- Pyramid
- Rue Morgue #59
