= Glenn Drover's Empires: The Age of Discovery =

Glenn Drover's Empires: The Age of Discovery is the first of the Glenn Drover's Empires board games, created in 2007 by Glenn Drover.

== Age of Empires III: The Age of Discovery ==
Age of Empires III: The Age of Discovery
- Designers: Glenn Drover
- Illustrators: Paul E. Niemayer
- Publishers: Tropical Games, Eagle Games
- Publication: 2007-05-14 (AOE3 edition)
- Players: 5

The first game in the series is based on the video game Age of Empires III, and was originally titled Age of Empires III: The Age of Discovery before being renamed to Glenn Drover's Empires: The Age of Discovery in 2011 following the loss of the naming rights to the Age of Empires series. It was originally published in 2007 by Tropical Games, and is currently distributed by Drover's own publishing company, Eagle Games. The game may be played by up to five players, though pieces for a sixth player were available in limited supply, and are included in the Builders Expansion, released in 2011 along with the renaming of the series.

=== Gameplay ===
Like the video game, each player takes on the role of a major European power attempting to discover the Americas - according to the game's manual, the five player colors represent England, France, Spain, Portugal, and Holland (the identity of the sixth nation for the limited-release sixth player pieces were not stated, though the Builders Expansion, which also adds a sixth player, has Italy as the identity of the sixth player). Though the nations are otherwise undifferentiated in the base game, the Builders Expansion adds National Advantages for each nation, which allows players certain special privileges that apply over the course of the game.

The Americas are divided into nine regions, each of which being associated with a particular trade good (there are also two trade goods not associated with any region). At the start of the game, only one of the nine regions are discovered, and discovery tiles are placed face-down in each of the eight other regions.

Each player begins with a small supply of money as well as colonists. The game is played over eight turns, with the first three turns referred to as "Age I", the next three as "Age II", and the final two turns as "Age III". At the start of each turn, players must place their colonists in any number of event boxes, taking turns until every player has placed their colonists. Afterwards, each event box is resolved in a prescribed order. The turn ends with each player collecting resources.

Events are resolved in the following order:

- Initiative, which alters the order in which players place their colonists in later turns as well as awarding a small amount of money.
- Colonist Dock, which moves colonists played there to regions of the board that already have been discovered.
- Trade Goods, which earn the player trade goods. Trade goods may also be earned if a player is the first to have three colonists in a region, or by the effects of capital buildings. Trade goods provide a fixed income for each player, awarded at the end of each turn, by arranging them in sets. Sets may be freely rearranged to optimize the amount of money earned.
- Merchant Shipping, which allows players to earn merchant ships if they have the most colonists there. Merchant ships count as "wild cards" for the purposes of set arrangement with trade goods, though no set may use more than one merchant ship.
- Capital Building, which allows players to purchase capital buildings. Five capital buildings are available for purchase each turn, and capital buildings are divided by age, with each capital building being only purchasable in their corresponding age. Capital buildings may either grant a one-time benefit or a lasting benefit.
- Discovery, which allows players to discover new regions. When players attempt to discover new regions, players must commit a number of colonists to the discovery of an area. Should the number of colonists exceed the defense value of the region (represented by Native American symbols), the region is considered discovered, and the player may place one colonist in the newly discovered region. Should the discovery fail, however, any colonists committed to the discovery are lost. Discovery of regions award the player a certain amount of money. Once all nine regions of the board are discovered, players may continue to assign colonists to Discovery, except that a separate Discovery Card deck is used. Cards in the Discovery Card deck represent regions outside of the Americas that have been discovered, but no colonists are assigned there should a discovery attempt succeed. Players may only make one discovery attempt per turn.
- Specialists, which allow a player to use a specialist for the following turn. Specialists are colonists which give extra benefits when assigned to specific tasks - for example, a captain, when assigned to Discovery, counts as two colonists, while a soldier may be deployed to defend colonies. There are four types of specialists, and only five specialists (one of each, plus one additional one) may be trained at any given turn (though the second specialist of a particular type requires an additional monetary cost). The Builders Expansion adds a fifth type of specialist to the game.
- Warfare, which allows players to attack opposing colonists that have been placed on the board. Players may either declare small-scale battles against another player in any one region, which is free, or declare a full-scale war against another player, which costs money but applies for every region where both players have colonists. When battling in a region, each soldier in a colony eliminates one opposing colonist.

With the exception of colonists that are sent to the Colonist Dock or are on Discovery, colonists are returned to a player's supply at the end of the turn.

At the end of the each age, players earn victory points based on the number of colonists in each region. For each region, the player with the most colonists is awarded six points, while the player with the second most is awarded two points. If two players tie for the most, both players are awarded two points. If more players tie for the most, or players tie for the second most, all tied players do not receive any points. At the end of the game, points are also awarded for the player's final-turn income, discovery tiles and discovery cards earned by the player over the course of the game, as well as for certain capital buildings which award points. Players playing with the Builders Expansion may also choose to purchase victory points for money at the end of each age. The player with the most victory points wins.

=== Reception ===
The Age of Empires III board game won the Origins Award for Historical Board Game of the Year of 2007.

Reviews:

- Rebel Times #14

== Glenn Drover's Empires: Builder Expansion ==
Glenn Drover's Empires: Builder Expansion
- Designers: Glenn Drover
- Illustrators: Sean Brown, Paul Niemeyer
- Publishers: Eagle-Gryphon Games
- Publication: 2011
- Players: 2-6

It is an Age of Empires III: The Age of Discovery expansion. Changes include the addition of Builder specialist type, 20 new capital buildings, a rules sheet with the new Builder Rules, Capital Buildings, and even special rules for a historical start (Each Nation has a special ability and one or two Capital Buildings to start the game); incorporation of Mint and Overpopulation, expand the game to support 6 players with complete set of purple colonists.

== Glenn Drover's Empires: Age of Discovery ==
Glenn Drover's Empires: Age of Discovery
- Designers: Glenn Drover
- Illustrators: Cyril Van Der Haegen
- Publishers: Eagle-Gryphon Games
- Publication: 2015
- Players: 2-6

It is a redesign of Empires: Builder Expansion following the loss of the naming rights to the Age of Empires series. The game included Empires: Builder Expansion along with its capital buildings.

Upgrade pack version also exists for owners of Age of Empires III: The Age of Discovery and Glenn Drover's Empires: Builder Expansion. Metal coins edition includes GDE:AOD, 100 metal replicas of gold and silver doubloons, free Ottoman Board, 4 Capital Buildings. Deluxe Edition BUNDLE includes GDE:AOD and 3 Player Expansions (Denmark, Prussia and Ottoman Boards & Pieces), World Map Variant Tiles (17 Trade Goods - 4 Types and 10 Capitals, 4 Bonus Capital Buildings, 3 Double-sided Player Reference Guides, 1 Additional 50 page (double-sided) Score Pad, 100 Metal Coins instead of Plastic Coins.

Deluxe editions of the game include Plague Promo Capital Buildings cards (Age 1 Plague Building, Age 2 Plague Building, Age 3 Plague Building).

=== Development ===
The game was started out as a Kickstarter funding campaign. The board game was published after receiving $207,936 from 1527 pledges, with lifetime funding reaching the 24 Stretch Goals (up to 210K Ottoman Empire player board) at $241,958. The $250K goal item (EAOD World Variant map), which fell short of the funding goal, is included with Deluxe Edition of the board game.

== Glenn Drover's Empires: The Age of Discovery - Bonus Capital Buildings ==
Glenn Drover's Empires: The Age of Discovery - Bonus Capital Buildings
- Designers: Glenn Drover
- Illustrators: Cyril Van Der Haegen
- Publishers: Eagle-Gryphon Games
- Publication: 2015
- Players: 2-6

It is an expansion of Glenn Drover's Empires: The Age of Discovery with four new Capital Buildings:

- Conquest of the Aztec Empire - Age I
- Spice Trade - Age II
- Colony in India - Age III
- Independence - Age III
