= Nanofictionary =

2002 storytelling card game

- Cover of 1st edition (2002) with art by Alison Frane
- Designers: Andy Looney
- Illustrators: Alison Frane
- Publishers: Looney Labs
- Publication: 1.0: 2002; 2.0:2013; 3.0: 2017
- Genres: Storytelling card game

Nanofictionary, subtitled "The card game of telling tiny stories", is a storytelling card game published by Looney Labs in 2002 in which the players create very short stories using idea cards.

== Description ==
=== The deck of cards ===
There are 110 cards in the deck that are divided into five types: Characters, Settings, Problems, Resolutions, and Actions. Each card has a black & white line drawing and a word or short phrase.

=== Gameplay ===
Each game is divided into three phases: Writing, Storytelling, and Awards.

==== Writing ====
The object of this phase is to create a very short story that contains four required elements: Character, Setting, Problem, and Resolution. Each player is dealt five cards.

All the players simultaneously draw a card and then have two options, also completed simultaneously:

1. Play a card face up in front of them.
  1. If it is a Character, Setting, Problem, or Resolution card: Each player can have multiple Characters displayed at the same time but only one Setting, Problem, or Resolution card face up — if a new card is played, it replaces the older card if one of that type has already been played.
  2. If it is an Action card, the player follows the described Action immediately. This might be to steal cards from other players, dig into the discard pile, etc.
2. Each player also has the option of discarding all cards in their hand and drawing five new cards, which completes their turn.

When every player has done one of the actions listed above, the turn is over, and another turn immediately starts.

Once a player has cards with all four required elements and has constructed a simple a story, the player declares that their story is finished, and will get bonus points for finishing early. Turns continue until all the other players are finished.

==== Storytelling ====
Each player in turn recites their story. Cedric Chin used the following example: "In the Ice Cream Parlor on the Moon, there was a terrible problem: the serving robot had malfunctioned! He was flinging ice cream everywhere! So they called for a repairman, and in came the Dude Who Always Says 'Dude!' The Dude took one look and said, 'Dude It's easy! All you need is Duct Tape!'"

Even though the player must have all four elements of the story face up in front of them, they do not have to use every card in the story. They are also free to add small details not mentioned in the cards, but the major characters and plot should conform to the cards they have played.

==== Awards ====
Each player is given a Grand Prize card and a Runner-Up card. Each player then awards each card to their two favorite stories, not counting their own. If there are people present who listened but did not play, they can also participate as a juror and award one point to their favorite story.

=== Victory conditions ===
The winning player is the one with the most points that were gained from award cards, juror points and points for ending the Writing phase quickly.

== Publication history ==
In 2002, Andy Looney created Nanofictionary, which was released by his company Looney Labs in 2002. The company released a second edition PDF in 2013, and a third edition with a 100-card deck in 2017. In 2018, the company released Nanofictionary Blanks, a deck of blank cards for creating custom story seeds.

== Reception ==
Writing for Pyramid, Brad Weier thought the game's strongest feature was "how little winning matters. Most players realize that telling entertaining and funny stories is far more important. Players can even vie for telling the worst story, since strategy matters so little. The humorous suggestions on the cards and the surreal way they connect provide great inspiration for the creative."

Cedric Cin, writing for Ogre Cave, compared this game to Once Upon a Time (Atlas Games, 1993) and found that Atlas' game "with its story elements focusing solely on fantasy tales, was easier to create stories with. Such a focus, however, obviously limits the players to a limited genre. Nanofictionary has enough absurdity to be less familiar." Cin felt the only issue with the game was the scoring system, which was "more complicated than it should be." Cin compared it to other, more cutthroat storytelling games and concluded, "If you have players who want a 'gentle' storytelling game, Nanofictionary is it."

Eric Mortensen reviewed Nanofictionary 3.0 (2018) and warned that competitive players will be disappointed, writing, "If you are only focused on trying to win the game, Nanofictionary is not going to be a very satisfying experience for you. The best way to approach Nanofictionary is to look at it as something you play to have fun with your friends and family. You will get the most enjoyment out of the game if you and the players are just looking for a good time telling funny/enjoyable stories." Mortensen's issue with the game was that, only having 100 cards to use as story seeds, it tended to lose creative steam after 30 minutes. Despite this, Mortensen concluded, "While Nanofictionary can get a little repetitive at times, it is a fun creative storytelling game that will be quite enjoyable with the right groups."

In the 2010 book Libraries Got Game: Aligned Learning Through Modern Board Games, Brian Mayer commented, "Nanofictionary provides a fluid environment within which students can put into practice many of the fundamental ELA [English Language Arts] skills they are developing in the classroom. The game's mechanics are reflective of the flexible information environments that are becoming more prevalent in today's world." Mayer concluded, "By using games such as Nanofictionary educators have access to tools that can marry their curriculum with meaningful examples of these contemporary environments."
