= Icebreaker (video game) =

1995 video game

- Developer: Magnet Interactive Studios
- Publishers: Panasonic; Fox Interactive (Windows)
- Designer: Andrew Looney
- Programmer: Andrew Looney
- Platforms: 3DO Interactive Multiplayer; Macintosh; Microsoft Windows
- Release: 3DO: NA: 1995; Windows: NA: 31 October 1995
- Genre: Action-strategy
- Mode: Single-player

Icebreaker is a 1995 strategy/action video game developed by Magnet Interactive Studios for the 3DO Interactive Multiplayer console. Despite the critical acclaim, the game did not sell well (mostly because of 3DO's failure on the 32-bit video game market). Later, the game was also ported to Macintosh and Windows, where it found a similar fate.

Despite the name, ice appears only in a fraction of the game's levels, and cannot be broken by any means. The game was so named because it was thought that its combination of simple objectives, intense action, and intellectually challenging design would make it appeal equally to casual gamers, hardcore gamers, and even non-gamers, and thus serve as a social icebreaker.

Icebreaker 2 was created but never released and, until recently, the only existing copy was in a custom built arcade style machine at creator Andrew Looney's house. Andrew Looney's Icebreaker 2 was made available for the 3DO by Older Games on August 3, 2007. By December 2007, Older Games had been purchased and is no longer selling the game. The game has a "peppy" soundtrack of simple electronic music.

== Gameplay ==
3DO Interactive Multiplayer version screenshot.

The player controls a sliding white pyramid (called a "Dudemeyer") on an isometric/diametric projection level. The goal is to eliminate all other pyramids (called "dudes"), starting with the stationary pyramids which line the field, and then the mobile pyramids (called "seekers") which move towards the white pyramid. Each kind of pyramid has its own weakness and specific way to be destroyed.

The game consists of 150 levels. A demo version was created which contains five representative levels from various parts of the game.

Features present in the game include:

- White Pyramid – The unit controlled by the player, which can move in eight directions and shoot fireballs from its point.
- Blue Pyramid – Stationary pyramids. They shatter when touched by the white pyramid.
- Red Pyramid – Stationary pyramids. When shot with a fireball, they vaporize. If the player's white pyramid touches a red pyramid, it "dies".
- Green Pyramid – Stationary pyramids. Cannot be destroyed by the white pyramid, only by seekers.

- Red, green and blue pyramids change into each other over the course of the game, with early levels being an exception as they "teach" the concepts of the pyramid types separately. Every few seconds, a randomly selected pyramid shifts color. The new color is dependent on the pyramid's old color; the shifts go from red to blue to green to red.

- Purple Pyramid – Stationary pyramids. When shot with a fireball, they turn into a pit.
- Concrete Pyramid – These are gray in color, and take a total of 10 fireballs to destroy.
- Rainbow Pyramid – When touched by the white pyramid or shot with a fireball, they turn into either a Red, Green, Blue, Purple, or Seeker pyramid. If they turn into a Red or Seeker Pyramid, they will immediately be destroyed.
- Seekers – Mobile pyramids which consistently move towards the white pyramid. Touching one is death. They can be destroyed with fireball shots, and in some cases by luring them into hazards, but will respawn the same instant that they are destroyed unless all immobile pyramids on the field have been wiped out. Seeker types are differentiated by color (yellow, pink, light blue, light green, green, light purple, mottled, and orange), speed, AI, and "death" animation. In addition, while most seekers are destroyed with one shot, mottled seekers (called "zombies") take 3 shots to destroy, and orange seekers (called "meanies") split into halves and then quarters when shot, changing both speed and AI with each split. Though AI varies among types, all seekers move in a straight line towards the white pyramid until they encounter an object. The differences are in how the seeker acts when it encounters an object; depending on AI, it will either run into it, slowly work its way around it, or hide behind it until the white pyramid comes near.
- Hazards – Pits, pools of lava, and carnivorous green slime appear as board hazards; they also destroy certain seekers.

== Development ==
The game was developed by Magnet Interactive Studios, a company based in Georgetown.

== Reception ==
Reception

Review scores
Publication	Score	
Publication	3DO	PC
AllGame	N/A	4/5
Electronic Gaming Monthly	4.5/10, 4/10, 4/10, 4/10	N/A
GameSpot	N/A	4.3/10
Next Generation	3/5	3/5
PC Gamer (US)	N/A	55%
3DO Magazine	4/5	N/A
Dimension 3	75%	N/A
Fusion	5/5	N/A
MacHome	N/A	3/5
Power Play	N/A	23%
Ultimate Future Games	29%	N/A
VideoGames	8/10	N/A

Icebreaker garnered a mixed reception from critics. GamePro's Miss Demeanor gave the 3DO version a generally positive review, assessing that "Part puzzler, part shooter, Ice Breaker refreshes both genres. Clunky controls limit the fun, but hundreds of levels offer depth and variety". Next Generation reviewed the 3DO version of the game, and stated that "even though the gameplay quickly gets repetitive, once you get the hang of it, it's sort of compulsive in an odd way, and still worth a look". The four reviewers of Electronic Gaming Monthly stated that the game concept is unique but boring to play, and that the game's graphics fail to demonstrate the full capabilities of the 3DO.

Reviewing the Windows version, a Next Generation critic commented that "for a simple little puzzle game, Icebreaker has a lot to offer." He elaborated that the variety of pyramids and other obstacles, the 150 levels, and the level builder combine to make a game with a deep and addictive challenge in spite of its simple and easy-to-learn concept.
