= Chop Suey (video game) =

1995 point-and-click video game

- Developer: Magnet Interactive Studios
- Publisher: Magnet Interactive Studios
- Designers: Theresa Duncan; Monica Gesue
- Composer: Brendan Canty
- Platforms: Macintosh, Windows
- Release: October 4, 1995
- Genre: point-and-click adventure game
- Mode: Single-player

Chop Suey is a point-and-click adventure game developed and published by Magnet Interactive Studios for the Macintosh in 1995. It was developed by Theresa Duncan and Monica Gesue to be a story disc for girls. Art is by Monica Gesue with additional art by Ian Svenonius, music and sound is by Brendan Canty, and narration is by author David Sedaris.

== Gameplay ==
The game is presented as a colorful interactive storybook, intended for girls aged 7–12. Two little girls explore the small town of Cortland, Ohio. The player clicks on the map of the town to explore buildings, houses and roads. Whenever everything in an area has been examined, the cursor changes to a moon, and a pointing finger appears on the screen to lead to another location. The locations are narrated by David Sedaris of National Public Radio.

== Plot ==
The girls, Lily and June Bugg, eat too much chop suey at the Ping Ping Palace, then daydream while staring at the clouds which turn into different shapes. While exploring the town, they can meet the black dog Mud Pup, and visit their favorite aunt's bedroom and try on her clothes and makeup where items tell of her past life as a Rockette on Broadway. After this, the girls pretend they are angels and fly to New York. Another location is the room of Aunt Vera's son Dooner, where the girls can look at graffiti on the walls, his diary, and magazines and records. They can also go on a picnic with Aunt Vera and her boyfriend Ned. Other locations include a Bingo Hall, the fortune teller Madame Mystery, a carnival where the player can play various games, and the Big Top where the girls can see various attractions.

== Development ==
Monica Lynn Gesue explained: “I dreamt up the idea for Chop Suey, and I went to Theresa. We went to lunch at Dean & DeLuca, and she wrote up the proposal and pitched it. She was the most confident person in the world. She had the brains, the charisma to get it made." She added "After hearing David Sedaris (then a part-time housecleaner) on local public radio, Duncan tracked him down asking him to narrate the Chop Suey script".

Duncan and Gesue said "We looked at a lot of kids' products. There wasn't anything that had the sort of strong story or character development or the kind of luminous, beautiful art you find in truly good children's books. And most of the interactivity is very predictable. And we wanted to do something that would encourage girls to look at software. Most of the CD-ROM market has been boy-oriented -- all that blow-'em-up, blood-and-guts, linear stuff. But hey, men make all the software." They consider the game "somewhat autobiographical", and added "we wanted it to look handmade". The game, along with Smarty, takes place in a small Midwestern town, and was based on Harriet the Spy due to giving young girls "a sense of inquisitiveness and wonder".

== Reception ==
World Village (Gamer's Zone) gave the game a rating of 100%, writing "The magical fantasy world of two little girls, Lily and June Bugg, comes to life in Chop Suey, a creative multimedia masterpiece developed by Magnet Interactive Studio. This hip interactive storybook provides a refreshing look at the curiosity and imagination of kids of all ages. You won't find another CD-ROM like it! Hats off to software developers Theresa Duncan and Monica Gesue, for providing a software title that will truly inspire girls AND boys to be more creative and aware of the music and colors that surround their lives". Dave Colker of the Los Angeles Times said, according to an LA Weekly article: "Smartypants’ is far and away the best disk ever for young girls ... except for her earlier CD-ROM ‘Chop Suey,’ which is even better." Craig Stoltz of the Washington Post reviewed the game in 1995, writing "This is a breakthrough title that instantly reveals what's missing from nearly every other CD-ROM 'storybook': A real, original story. Chop Suey has at its core a vivid tale written just for this project...Bottom line: As a title with an original, creative work at its core, it hits an industry high mark. And it's one of the best CD-ROMs for girls we've seen". He wrote in 1996 that "Theresa Duncan's first CD-ROM, an edgy daydream called Chop Suey, remains one of the finest stories-on-CD ever produced." Joe Brown of The Washington Post said "Like the best children's books, the antic and anarchic product dissolves the boundaries between kid and grown-up tastes...When released this summer, Suey will likely seduce grown-ups and even, maybe, cynical teens."

Entertainment Weekly named Chop Suey as its CD-ROM of the year for 1995. AllThingsD described it as "an award-winning video game for girls, but without all the dopey princess stuff and with a ton of sophistication", adding "it was pure imagination". It concluded "While the CD-ROM business proved to be a bridge technology and “Chop Suey” did not endure the onslaught of the Web, after seeing it, I have never forgotten it. And it was one of the key products that made me love covering the interactive space so very much." The blurb for the session On the Work of Theresa Duncan deemed the work "experimental".

The game was included in a collection of education software that was donated to The National Museum of Play in Rochester, New York. "The Game Design Reader: A Rules of Play Anthology" argues that three games of Theresa Duncan (Chop Suey, Smarty, and Zero Zero), "offer a digital version of Harriet's 'Town'". XDell wrote "Chop Suey (co-written by Monica Gesue), combined storytelling with exploration. Gameplay was similar to such popular 1980s interactive fiction as Adventure (the original adventure game), and Leather Goddesses of Phobos, but with graphics (by Gesue), narration (by David Sedaris), and a different audience in mind."

=== Retrospective reception ===
Critics have retrospectively praised Chop Suey and remarked that the game featured personally resonant and impactful subject matter. Several viewed the game in the context of the girls' video games trend, and considered it subverted the gender stereotypes in the games of its era. Amy Rose Spiegel of The Cut wrote that Duncan had written a "truer story about what might matter to girls" through creating a more personal title focused on "human oddities" and familiar elements of everyday life. Jenn Frank of Vice praised the wistfulness and "wry flourishes" of its writing and the liveliness of Gesue's artwork, whilst stating it was "strangely static" and featured little to do. Racquel Gonzales of The Strong National Museum of Play praised Chop Suey for its immersive depiction of community and its nonlinear and exploratory design, writing that it "demonstrates ways we can experience and showcase a community by centering the lives of the inhabitants" and "celebrates children hanging out and making their own spaces for imagination".

== External links (to be included in article) ==
- Chapter dedicated to Chop Suey in the book From Barbie to Mortal Kombat: Gender and Computer Games
