= Behind the Walls =

Behind the Walls may refer to:

- Behind the Walls, the first special episode of Prison Break
- Derrière les murs, the first French live-action feature to be shot in 3D
- "Behind the Walls", a song on The N.W.A Legacy, Vol. 2
- Behind the Walls (film), a 2008 French film
- Behind the Walls, a 2018 American film, written and directed by The Kondelik Brothers
- Behind the Walls: A Guide for Families and Friends of Texas Prison Inmates, a book by Jorge Antonio Renaud
- Behind the Walls (sculpture), a 2018 sculpture by Jaume Plensa
