= Andy Looney =

American game designer and programmer (born 1963)

Andrew J. Looney
- Born: November 5, 1963 (age 62)
- Occupation: Game designer
- Employer: Looney Labs
- Known for: Game designing; Eagle Scout
- Title: Chief creative officer
- Spouse: Kristin (Wunderlich)
- Website: wunderland.com

Andrew J. Looney (born November 5, 1963) is a game designer and computer programmer. He is also a photographer, a cartoonist, a video-blogger, and a marijuana-legalization advocate.

Andrew and Kristin Looney together founded the games company Looney Labs, where Andrew is the chief creative officer. Looney Labs has published most of his game designs, such as Fluxx, Chrononauts, and the Icehouse game system. His other game designs include Aquarius, Nanofictionary, IceTowers, Treehouse, and Martian Coasters.

== Early life and education ==
Andy Looney's mother encouraged her children to play board games. Looney recalled "she knew that playing a board game was a great way to keep a group of kids occupied, entertained, and even educated ... even before we could read, she was teaching us games like Sorry, Moustrap, and Booby-Trap." Looney's father worked for NASA, and Looney started playing computer games in his father's office at an early age, using his father's mainframe access to play text adventures and an ASCII-based Star Trek game. When Looney's father built a home computer, Looney used it to write primitive computer games.

Looney joined the Boy Scouts and became an Eagle Scout. He entered the University of Maryland at College Park in 1981 as a freshman with an undecided major between English and computer science. He eventually selected computer science, thinking that he could get a job in computer programming and pursue a free-lance writing career in his spare time.

== Game designer ==
When Looney started at NASA's Goddard Space Flight Center as a software programmer in 1986, he met his future wife, Kristin Wunderlich, a computer engineer designing computer chips.

Pursuing his dream to become a freelance write, Looney wrote "The Empty City", a science-fiction short story. Wanting a game in the story but feeling a card game was too boring, he created a fictional game, Icehouse, that used pyramids. Readers wanted to learn how to play the game, and Looney responded by co-creating (with John Cooper and Kristin) actual rules, then plastic pyramid pieces to play Icehouse. The pieces were made from resin in his apartment, which upset the landlord due to the smell. This led them to launch their own game company, Icehouse Games. After several years, Looney shut down Icehouse Games, Inc.

Looney and Kristin launched Looney Laboratories in 1996 as a part-time home based design company. Andrew soon designed the Fluxx card game. He then went on to a brief career as a game programmer at Magnet Interactive Studios, where he created that company's only entry to the market, Icebreaker. Aquarius was Andy's and Labs' next game, launched in 1998. In 2002, a few years after Kristin went full-time with their company, Andy followed.

== Patents & awards ==
Andy has three U.S. patents and five Origins Awards.

Looney holds patents on the game mechanics for:

- Icehouse – U.S. Patent 4,936,585 - Method of manipulating and interpreting playing pieces
  - https://patents.google.com/patent/US4936585A
- IceTowers – U.S. Patent 6,352,262 - Method of conducting simultaneous gameplay using stackable game pieces
  - https://patents.google.com/patent/US6352262B1
- Chrononauts – U.S. Patent 6,474,650 - Method of simulation time travel in a card game
  - https://patents.google.com/patent/US6474650B1

Looney has won the following game design awards:

- 1999 – Mensa Mind Games: Mensa Select Award for Fluxx
- 2000 – Origins Award: Best Abstract Board Game for Icehouse: The Martian Chess Set
- Chrononauts
  - 2000 – Origins Award: Best Traditional Card Game
  - 2001 – Parents Choice Silver Honors
- 2001 – Origins Award: Best Abstract Board Game for Cosmic Coasters
- 2003 – Parents Choice Silver Honors Nanofictionary
- 2007 – Origins Award: Best Board Game or Expansion of the Year for Treehouse
- 2008 – Origins Award: Best Traditional Card Game of the Year for Zombie Fluxx
- Fall 2013 – Parents' Choice Recommended Seal category Games for Fluxx: The Board Game
- Spring 2014 – Parents' Choice FunStuff Award for Loonacy

== Works ==
- Aquarius
- Chrononauts
  - Early American Chrononauts
- Cosmic Coasters
- Fluxx
  - EcoFluxx
  - Family Fluxx
  - Zombie Fluxx
  - Monty Python Fluxx
  - Martian Fluxx
  - Stoner Fluxx
  - Star Fluxx
  - Cartoon Network Fluxx
  - Regular Show Fluxx
  - Adventure Time Fluxx
  - Holiday Fluxx
  - Cthulhu Fluxx
  - Pirate Fluxx
  - Oz Fluxx
  - Monster Fluxx
- Icebreaker
- Icehouse and other games played with the Icehouse pieces:
  - IceTowers
  - Martian Chess
  - Treehouse
  - Zark City
- Nanofictionary
- Proton
- Q*Turn
