= Beyond the Wall: Stories Behind the Vietnam Wall =

1995 video game

- Developer: Magnet Interactive Studios
- Publisher: Fox Interactive
- Platforms: Windows; Macintosh
- Release: October 1995
- Genre: Educational

Beyond the Wall: Stories Behind the Vietnam Wall is a 1995 video game from Magnet Interactive Studios.

== Summary ==
The CD contains the names of the 58,196 American soldiers who died or were missing in action in the Vietnam War. It is narrated by Adrian Cronauer, the Armed Forces Radio disc jockey Robin Williams portrayed in the film Good Morning, Vietnam.

== Development ==
The Vietnam Veterans Memorial Fund helped with the game's development. The project cost more than $500,000 to make

== Reception ==
Reception

Review scores
Publication	Score
Entertainment Weekly	A+
The Columbian	4/5

CNET said "A tribute to those who died in the Vietnam War, Beyond The Wall avoids discussing the controversy surrounding it or the protests back home. Nonetheless, it is a worthy tribute to the soldiers killed and to their memorial"

Entertainment Weekly said "Beyond the Wall deploys the standard point-and-click interface in a way that encourages contemplation and reflection rather than busy screen hopping. In so doing, it comes very close to a live experience, something I never expected a CD-ROM to be capable of"

MacHome Journal said "And in its own small way, like the memorial itself, Beyond the Wall is a tribute to those who suffered through Vietnam".

The game won New Media magazine’s top “Best of Show” 1996 Invision award.
