= Icehouse pieces =

Pyramid shaped gaming pieces

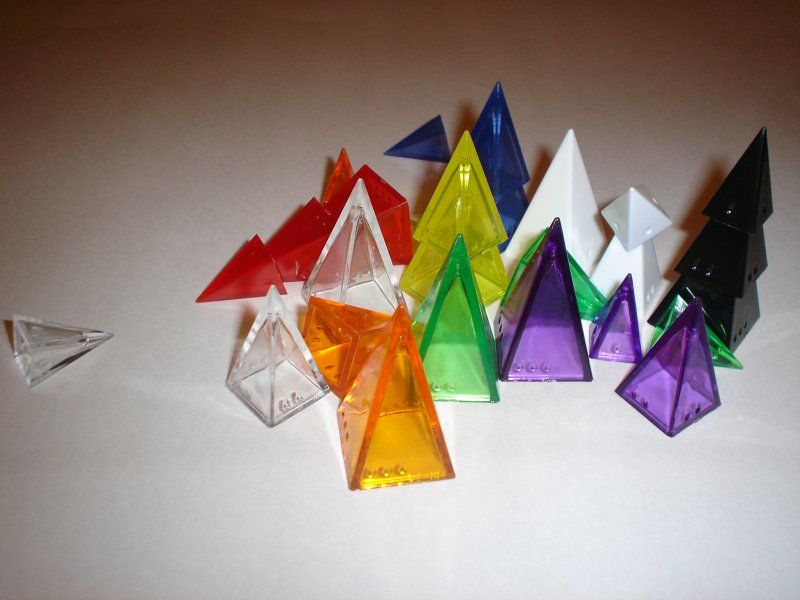
- Various Icehouse pieces
- Other names: Icehouse pyramids; Treehouse Pyramids; Looney Pyramids (official)
- Manufacturers: Grand Prix International
- Designers: John Cooper; Andrew Looney
- Publishers: Looney Labs
- Publication: 1989; 37 years ago
- Years active: 1987–present
- Genres: Game system
- Website: icehousegames.com

Icehouse pieces, or Icehouse Pyramids, Treehouse pieces, Treehouse Pyramids and officially Looney Pyramids, are nestable and stackable pyramid-shaped gaming pieces and a game system. The game system was invented by Andrew Looney and John Cooper in 1987, originally for use in the game of Icehouse.

== History ==
Andrew Looney in 1987 penned a sci-fi short story, "The Empty City", that included a game called Icehouse, an ancient Martian game. Readers requested to learn how to play the game. Thus actual rules were invented for Icehouse by Andrew Looney, Kristin Wunderlich (then future wife of Looney) and John Cooper, then plastic pyramid pieces were made to play the game. The first commercially available set were solid non-stackable pyramids released in 1989 with only 100 sets made. The pieces were made from resin in his apartment, which upset the landlord. After several years, Looney shut down Icehouse Games, Inc. and soon started another gaming company, Looney Laboratories, in 1996.

Additional games beyond Icehouse were created including Martian Chess, Zendo, and Homeworlds. Looney then created the IceTowers game which used stacking pyramids leading to a change in the pyramid pieces' specification for stacking. The four games were released as a part of Icehouse: The Martian Chess Set, which was the first Icehouse pyramid system release by Looney Labs. In 2001, Icehouse: The Martian Chess Set won the Origins Award for Best Abstract Board Game of 2000. Icehouse was recognized as a game system in the game design textbook Rules of Play by Katie Salen and Eric Zimmerman.

By June 21, 2002, Icehouse pieces were being sold in tubes containing a stash, or 15 pyramids of a single color, with nine colors available. Labs then released the book Playing With Pyramids, which contained a dozen games by the Looneys, Cooper, Kory Heath and Jacob Davenport.

In 2004, the Zendo boxed set won Best Abstract Board Game of 2003, In 2005 the set won the Mensa Select Game Award. While in 2007, Treehouse won the Origins Award for Best Board Game of 2006.

Looney Labs relaunched the Icehouse pieces as "Looney Pyramids" with new packaging with its IceDice set in June 2011 followed by Pink Hijinks in December 2012. By 2013, the IcehouseGames.org website listed 400 games playable with icehouse pyramids.

Original prototype under the name of Pyramid Throwdown in 2015, Pyramid Arcade was launched as a Kickstarter campaign on April 5, 2016. The new boxed pyramid set was funded in under 12 hours. Racking up $150 thousand total, the set shipped to supporters in fall 2016. Looney Labs put their Pyramid Quartet, Nomids, Ice Duo, Martian Chess and Homeworlds, together up on Kickstarter in February 2020, which was funded in three hours.

== Description ==
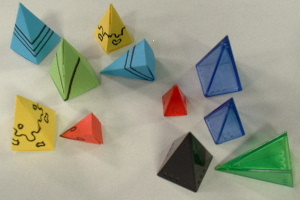
Icehouse pieces in paper and plastic

The pieces are four-sided pyramids that can nest and stack with pipping from 1 to 3 at the base. A group of three pyramids, one of each size, is called a "trio." Each "stash" or set of Icehouse pieces consists of five trios, or fifteen pyramids (variously called pieces, pyramids, or minions) of the same color and five of each three sizes: five large 3-point pyramids (called "queens" in some games), five medium 2-point pyramids (sometimes called "drones"), and five small 1-point pyramids (or "pawns"). The stacked and nested feature is not used in the original Icehouse game, but is taken advantage of in some of the other Icehouse-based games listed below.

Icehouse pieces were, for many years, sold as tubes containing one stash of durable crystal-look plastic pieces in one of ten available colors (though cyan was only available through their promotional program or as part of the Ice Towers set). There was also a less expensive starter set called Origami Icehouse (later called Paper Icehouse), made of cardstock in four colors, which one punched out and folded into the pyramid shapes. In 2006, Looney Labs began selling Icehouse pieces as Treehouse sets, which are multicolored sets of 15 pyramids: five colors, each color having one each of the three sizes. Looney Labs has also sold boxed sets for Zendo and IceTowers; the latter contained cyan pieces. The Icehouse website also has instructions for making your own pieces. Looney Labs has licensed Crystal Caste to make regulation-sized Icehouse pieces out of semiprecious stone. Beginning with its Looney Pyramids relaunch set, IceDice, the sets are packaged in pyramid shaped nylon zipper bag until Pyramid Arcade.

== Releases ==
Set	pieces	games	released
=== IceHouse Games ===
Icehouse (The Original Black Box)	standard color stash	Icehouse	1989
Paper Icehouse ("Origami" Icehouse)	standard color stash	Icehouse	1991
Paper Icehouse ("Origami" Icehouse)	Neon stash	Icehouse	1991
Xyloid Icehouse	wood standard color stash	Icehouse	1992
=== Looney Labs stack-able ===
The Martian Chess Set (MCS)	2 standard color stash in plastic box	Martian Chess, IceTowers, IceTraders & Zarcana; Origins Award for Best Abstract Board Game of 2000	1999
Black Ice expansion	black and clear pyramids and a Martian chessboard bandana in hemp drawstring bag	None, coupon for future rule book (3HOUSE)	2000
Giant Cardboard Pyramids			2001
Icehouse Pieces monochrome stash tubes	one color stash	none	2001
Playing with Pyramids booklet (PwP)	none	IceTowers, Thin Ice, Zendo, Martian Backgammon, Volcano, Martian Chess, RAMbots, Pikemen, Zagami, Homeworlds, Gnostica, and the original Icehouse	2001
Zendo boxed set	2 standard color stashes, 60 glass stones (green, white, black)	Zendo (w/16 starter rule cards) & ICE-7 other games reference cards	2003
IceTowers boxed set	2 alternate colors stashes & The Empty City book	IceTowers & ICE-7 reference cards	2003
Icehouse Pieces monochrome stash tubes	gray stash	none	2006
Volcano Caps	5 smalls grays	none	2006
=== Treehouse ===
Treehouse Rainbow	one rainbow stash, a custom die	Treehouse	2006
Treehouse Xeno	one xeno stash, a custom die	Treehouse	2006
3HOUSE booklet (3H)	none	Black Ice, Martian Chess, Binary Homeworlds	2007
Pink Treehouse	1 pink stash	Treehouse	2008
=== Looney Pyramids ===
IceDice	2 rainbow stashes, two custom dice	IceDice, Launchpad 23	June 2011
Treehouse (second edition)	one rainbow stash, a six-sided die and a custom die, a little fabric board	Treehouse, Pharaoh	September 2011
Rainbow Stash box	one rainbow stash	none	
Xeno Stash box	one xeno stash	none	
Pink Hijinks	three pink trios, 3×3 grid and a custom die	Pink Hijinks	December 2012
Pyramid Primer #1 booklet (PP1)	none	13 games: Black ICE, Caldera, Homeworlds, IceDice, Icehouse, IceTowers, Launchpad 23, Martian Chess, Martian Coasters, Pharaoh, Treehouse, World War 5, Zark City	
Pyramid Arcade (PA)	90 pyramids: 10 colors (rainbow & xeno) 3 trio each; 8 mini gameboards & 3 large boards; cards: Zark City (5 suited square deck), Twin Win cards, Pyramid Arcade cards; 9 six-sided dice: 3 standard, 3 lightning, 3 others; a drawstring bag, a turn token	22 games: Black Ice, Color Wheel, Give or Take, Hijinks, Homeworlds, Ice Dice, Ice Towers, Launchpad 23, Looney Ludo, Lunar Invaders, Martian Chess, Petal Battle, Petri Dish, Pharaoh, Powerhouse, Pyramid-Sham-Bo, Twin Win, Treehouse, Verticality, Volcano, World War 5, Zark City	November 3, 2016
Nomids (PQ) (Note: Pyramid Quartet)	a trio each of all ten colors	Nomids	2020
Ice Duo (PQ)	2 trios each of red, yellow, cyan, purple, and green, and two custom dice	Ice Dice, Twin Win	2020
Martian Chess (PQ)	6 trios of martian red or chrome silver	Martian Chess	2020
Homeworlds (PQ)	3 trios each of the standard colors	Homeworlds	2020
Jinxx (PQ)	3 trios each of clear, white, grey and black	Jinxx	May 3, 2024

- standard colors: red, blue, green, yellow
- Neon colors: purple, orange, lime green, and hot pink
- alternate colors: cyan, clear, white, purple
- original monochrome stash tubes colors: red, yellow, blue, green, purple, orange, black, white, clear
- rainbow colors: red, dark blue, green, yellow, opaque black (standard plus black)
- xeno colors: orange, purple, cyan, clear, white

== Games ==
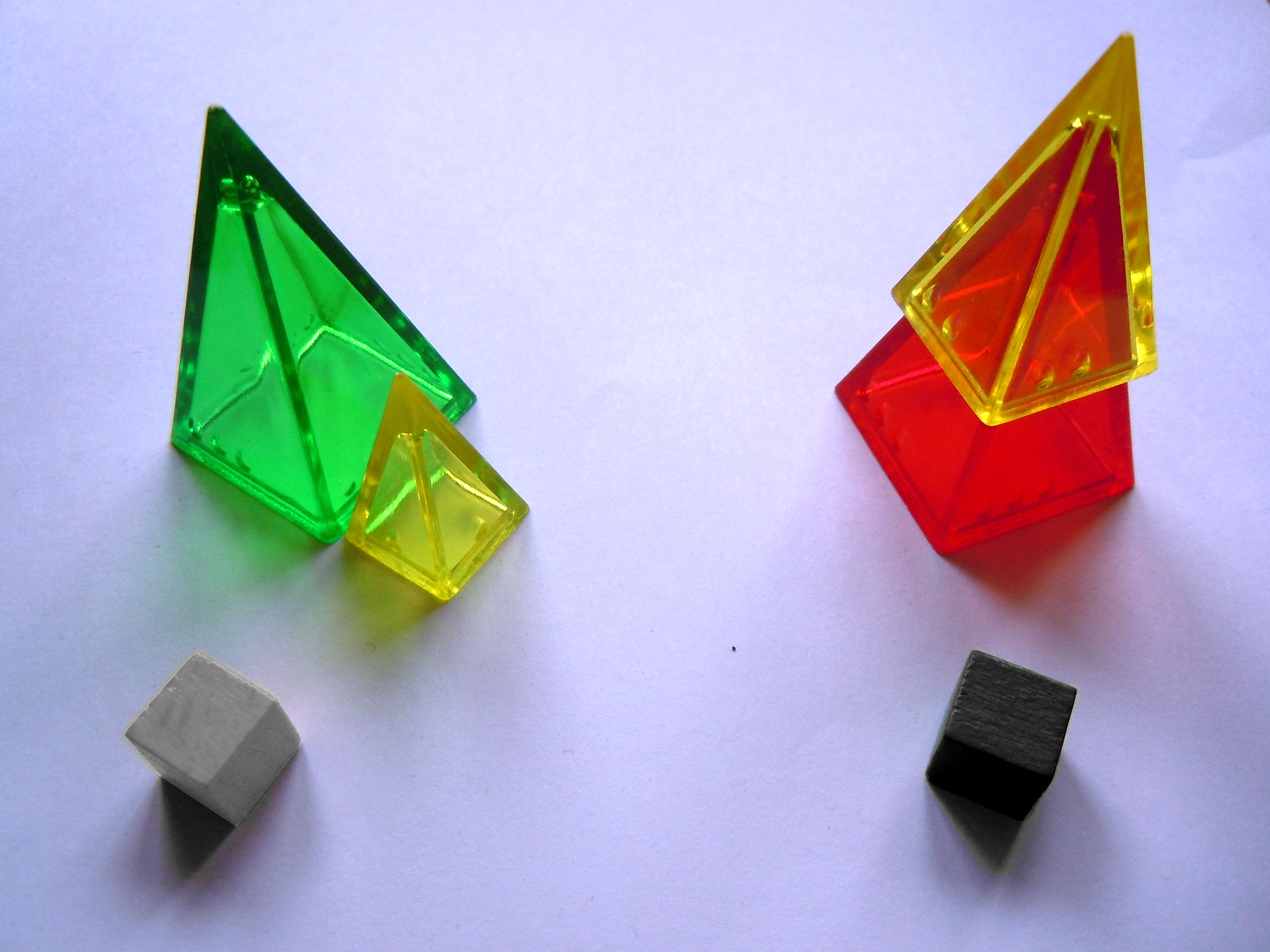
Icehouse pieces being used to play Zendo

As a game system, Icehouse pieces can be used to play many different abstract strategy games. Most games need at least two colors, and some require other readily available equipment such as glass stones or a checkerboard.

Game	Year	Publication	Designer(s)	description/note
Icehouse	1989	PwP, PP1	Andrew Looney and John Cooper	
Martian Chess	1995	MCS, PwP, 3H, PP1, PA, PQ	Andrew Looney	
Zarcana	1996	MCS	John Cooper	an early form of Gnostica
Pikemen	1997	PwP	Jacob Davenport	
Thin Ice	1997	PwP	Jacob Davenport	
IceTowers	1999	MCS, PwP, PP1, PA	Andrew Looney	a stacking game
IceTraders	1999	MCS	John Cooper	an early version of Homeworlds
Volcano	2000	PwP, PA	Kristin Looney	
Zagami	2000	PwP	Kory Heath	
Gnostica	2001	PwP	John Cooper, Kory Heath, Kristin Matherly, Jacob Davenport	
Homeworlds	2001	PwP, PP1, PA, PQ	John Cooper	a 4X conquest and abstract space battle/exploration game
Martian Backgammon	2001	PwP	Kristin Looney	
RAMbots	2001	PwP	Kory Heath	
Zendo	2001	PwP	Kory Heath	Origins Award: Best Abstract Board Game of 2003
Binary Homeworlds	2004	3H	John Cooper	variant of Homeworlds
Martian Coasters (later Looney Ludo)	2006	PP1, PA	Andrew Looney	
Treehouse	2006	Treehouse, PP1, PA	Andrew Looney	a matching game; Origins Award for Best Board Game of 2006
Black ICE	2007	3H, PP1, PA	Andrew Looney	
Twin Win	2007	PA, PQ	Andrew Looney	First published on Andrew Looney's website
World War 5	2008	PP1, PA	Andrew Looney	
Zark City	2008	PP1, PA	Andrew Looney	Inspired by Zarcana and Gnostica
Pharaoh	2010	PP1, Treehouse 2nd Edition, PA	Andrew Looney	
Caldera	2011	PP1	Kristin Looney	variant of Volcano
IceDice	2011	PP1, IceDice, PA, PQ	Andrew Looney	
Launchpad 23	2011	PP1, IceDice, PA	Andrew Looney	collecting game
Pink Hijinks (later Hijinks)	December 2012	Pink Hijinks, PA	Andrew Looney	"king of the hill" strategy
Color Wheel	November 3, 2016	PA	Andrew Looney	
Give or Take	November 3, 2016	PA	Andrew Looney	
Lunar Invaders	November 3, 2016	PA	Andrew Looney	variant of Cosmic Coasters
Petal Battle	November 3, 2016	PA	Andrew Looney	
Petri Dish	November 3, 2016	PA	Andrew Looney	
Powerhouse	November 3, 2016	PA	Andrew Looney	
Pyramid-Sham-Bo	November 3, 2016	PA	Andrew Looney	
Verticality	November 3, 2016	PA	Andrew Looney	
Nomids	2020	PQ	Andrew Looney	
Jinxx	2024	PQ	Andrew Looney	loosely based on Hijinks
