= Jeremy Blake =

American painter (1971–2007)

- Born: October 4, 1971; Fort Sill, Oklahoma, U.S.
- Died: July 17, 2007 (aged 35); New York City, U.S.
- Education: The School of the Art Institute of Chicago (BFA) California Institute of the Arts (MFA)
- Occupations: Digital artist, painter
- Partner: Theresa Duncan
- Website: https://www.jeremyblakeestate.com/

Jeremy Blake (October 4, 1971 – July 17, 2007) was an American digital artist and painter. His work included projected DVD installations, Type C prints, and collaborative film projects.

== Education and career ==
Blake graduated from the School of the Art Institute of Chicago with a B.F.A. in 1993 and the California Institute of the Arts with an M.F.A. in 1995.

Still from Blake's Winchester Redux, a five-minute digital video with sound, continuous loop (2004)

His work was selected for the Whitney Biennial in 2000, 2002 and 2004. His "Winchester" series, inspired by the story of Sarah Winchester and the Winchester Mystery House, was shown at the San Francisco Museum of Modern Art in 2005. He also was selected to participate in the Renaissance Society group exhibition, "All the Pretty Corpses", in 2005.

Blake also created the painted abstract interlude sequences for Paul Thomas Anderson's fourth film Punch-Drunk Love, and contributed images and video for Beck's album Sea Change. Blake was also involved in creating and commissioning a soundtrack album called The Forty Million Dollar Beatnik with Neil Landstrumm and Mike Fellows in 2000 on Scandinavia Records and Pork Salad Press to accompany an L.A. drawings/script show by Blake of the same title.

His work is held in the collections of the Museum of Modern Art and the San Francisco Museum of Modern Art.

== Personal life ==
Blake was the boyfriend of filmmaker, cultural critic and video game designer Theresa Duncan. In February 2007, the couple moved from Los Angeles to New York City, and resided in the East Village. He was also the son of Anne Schwartz Delibert and the brother of Adrienne Morningstar Delibert.

=== Death ===
On July 10, 2007, Blake found Duncan dead in their apartment, the result of an apparent suicide. On July 17, 2007, Blake was reported missing off New York's Rockaway Beach in Queens. According to press reports, a woman had called 911 to report that she saw a man walking out into the ocean. Blake's clothes and wallet were reportedly found along with a suicide note that referred to Duncan. On July 22, 2007, Blake's body was found by a fisherman in the waters off Sea Girt, New Jersey. Blake's cause of death was presumed to be suicide by drowning.

According to statements by acquaintances of the couple that have appeared in published reports (including an article in the January 2008 Vanity Fair), Blake said that he and Duncan were being followed and harassed by Scientologists prior to his disappearance. Blake also included his allegations of harassment by Scientologists and others in a 27-page "chronicle" he prepared for a lawsuit he planned to file.

The Law & Order episode "Bogeyman" in season 18 is loosely based on the deaths of Duncan and Blake. In the episode, the body of the character paralleling Theresa Duncan has forensic evidence that calls into question her suicide, while the Jeremy Blake parallel character survives his suicide attempt. A legal case against him is disrupted by the cult group Systemotics, resulting in a near mistrial followed by a plea accepted after the ADA implies both he and the judge are connected to Systemotics.

The nightclub Bungalow 8, which operated in New York City from 2001 to 2009, was named for Blake's 1998 video work.

David Berman, a frontman of the band Silver Jews, wrote a song called "My Pillow is the Threshold" for Blake after Duncan's suicide.
