= Theresa Duncan =

American video game designer (1966–2007)

- Born: Theresa Lee Duncan; October 26, 1966; Lapeer, Michigan, U.S.
- Died: July 10, 2007 (aged 40); New York City, U.S.
- Occupations: Video game designer, blogger, filmmaker, critic
- Partner: Jeremy Blake

Theresa Duncan (October 26, 1966 – July 10, 2007) was an American video game designer, blogger, filmmaker and critic. By the late 1990s, she was recognized as one of the most critically acclaimed game designers for young girls.

== Career ==
Duncan created three influential CD-ROM computer games for young girls in the second half of the 1990s: Chop Suey, Smarty, and Zero Zero. These games were designed as alternatives to her traditionally male-oriented field where the few "girls' games" created embodied a "model of boy-catching self-fulfillment". Duncan spoke out against market-tested girls' games characterized by an "earnest blandness" and a "perfunctory feminism [like] slapping the pink bow on Pac-Man".

All three games created by Duncan are story-based and revolve around search and discovery. 1995's Chop Suey is an interactive storybook, where two young girls explore the town of Cortland, Ohio. Smarty (1996) tells the story of the titular young girl's visit to her Aunt Olive for the summer—there she hosts a spelling radio show, explores small-town life, and visits a mysterious dime store. Released in 1997, Zero Zero follows a young girl named Pinkee in fin de siècle Paris who hops from rooftop to rooftop, explores the catacombs, and experiences the city.

Chop Suey was co-created with Monica Gesue and narrated by then-unknown author David Sedaris. Gesue strived to design a "colorful, warm, and bright" game that contrasted with the way "a lot of computer graphics at the time were really icky". For Smarty and Zero Zero, Duncan collaborated with her partner Jeremy Blake. Smarty maintained Chop Suey's "warm, handmade, and folk-inspired" look, but was also "less messy, and more idyllic, with more carefully rendered perspective with "loose and painterly" backgrounds. Blake created more than 3,000 drawings for the game. Zero Zero was "a period piece, and Blake used thick, crooked lines that sometimes seemed to suggest a woodcut drawing". At the time, she sought out David Sedaris after hearing him on local public radio. Duncan tracked Sedaris down and asked him to narrate the script for the game.

Duncan spoke frequently of a proposed game for older girls called Apocalipstick. She described it as something that "moves like Doom", and "involves survivors of a cataclysmic destructive event who find the few films that remain, which happen to be solely swanky thirties Thin Man-style flicks...[and attempt to recreate] life based on the Stork Club and Fortuny and the weapons of glamour".

In 2000, Duncan created The History of Glamour, a digitally animated hour-long video. Writing for Salon, Matthew Debord described the work as "a merciless satire of New York's incestuous '90s cultural moment: fashion, art, celebrity and various downtown style tribes converge and are shredded for our delectation". In the same article, Duncan noted that the work is influenced by the play Love, Loss, and What I Wore by Nora and Delia Ephron. The History of Glamour was included in the 2000 Whitney Biennial.

Duncan also published frequently. She wrote articles for publications like Artforum, Slate, Feed Magazine, and Bald Ego, and published her own blog called The Wit of the Staircase. At her blog, Duncan listed her interests as "film, philology, Vietnam War memorabilia, rare and discontinued perfume, book collecting, philately, card and coin tricks, futurism, Napoleon Bonaparte, the history of electricity."

=== Legacy ===
Duncan's CD-ROMs are widely celebrated. Chop Suey has the broadest reputation. Upon its release, Entertainment Weekly named it 1995's "CD-ROM of the Year" and it was generally praised by reviewers. In recent years, it has been celebrated as a significant work of the CD-ROM boom. Kara Swisher wrote in 2007, "While the CD-ROM business proved to be a bridge technology and Chop Suey did not endure the onslaught of the Web, after seeing it, I have never forgotten it". In 2012 in Motherboard, video games critic Jenn Frank called Chop Suey "timeless", and celebrated its bravery in representing "the criminally underrepresented: that is, the wild imagination of some girl aged 7 to 12".

Because her games were designed on CD-ROMs to be played on operating systems that are "no longer possible to install on modern computers", the games were for many years inaccessible to most people. In 2015, Rhizome, a nonprofit that focuses on new media art, restored Duncan's games by making the "original, unaltered" games playable in a web browser with fundraising assistance via Kickstarter. In 2023, ScummVM announced support for Chop Suey as part of their effort to support Macromedia Director games.

== Personal life ==
Theresa Lee Duncan was born in Lapeer, Michigan, to Donnie and Mary Duncan. She lived with partner Jeremy Blake in New York during the nineties while working for an interactive agency, and in Los Angeles until 2007, after which Duncan and Blake moved back to Manhattan.

=== Death ===
Duncan was found dead in the East Village, Manhattan apartment she shared with Blake on July 10, 2007. The official cause of death was suicide. Blake is believed to have died by suicide a week later, having been seen by an anonymous 911 caller walking into the Atlantic Ocean near Rockaway Beach, Queens. According to friends of the couple, Duncan and Blake believed that they were being followed and harassed by Scientologists up to the point of their deaths. After her death, two posts appeared on her web log (presumably written prior to her death). On New Year's Eve in 2007, she published her last blog post, titled "New Beginning", which quoted T. S. Eliot's poem East Coker.

The circumstances of Duncan's death led to much media attention, including major articles in Vanity Fair and New York magazine.

The Law & Order episode "Bogeyman" in season 18 is loosely based on the deaths of Duncan and Blake. In the episode, the body of the character paralleling Theresa Duncan has forensic evidence that calls into question her suicide, while the Jeremy Blake parallel character survives his suicide attempt. A legal case against him is disrupted by the cult group, resulting in a near mistrial followed by a plea accepted after the ADA implies both he and the judge are connected to the cult.

Baron von Luxxury's 2012 album The Last Seduction features several songs about Duncan and Blake, who were his friends.
