= Magnet Interactive Studios =

Software development company

- Company type: Software development
- Founded: 1989
- Founder: Greg Johnson, Basel Dalloul

Magnet Interactive Studios was a software development company based in Georgetown. Founded in 1989 by designer Greg Johnson as a print and 3D design firm and later joined by businessman Basel Dalloul, the company saw a short-lived software and video game business in the mid-1990s as a subsidiary of the Magnet Interactive Group holding company. The studio was shut down in 1996 after demand dropped due to the advent of the Internet, firing its employees. Only Magnet Interactive Communications, a web development company and separate subsidiary, remained operational.

The company had five divisions, action and role-playing video games, business applications, edutainment and children's games, interactive story and strategy, and the advanced products group. Among the video games developed by the studio are Beyond the Wall: Stories Behind the Vietnam Wall (1995), Icebreaker (1995), a strategy and action game, and Chop Suey (1995), a point-and-click adventure. They were developing a space video game called Bluestar, planned for release in November 1995, and Hellraiser: Virtual Hell, a game based on the Hellraiser franchise planned for release in early 1996, but they were both cancelled upon the studio's shutdown.

== History ==
The company was created in 1989 as a print and 3D design firm, and soon switched to developing interactive media. In February 1994, The company changed its name from Magnet Design and Communications to Magnet Interactive Studios. By June 1995, the company employed 212 people and had 300 PC and Mac computers, including an SGI Challenge. At the time, Johnson was chief technical officer and senior creative director, and Dalloul the chairman and CEO. The company was seen as unusual for making numerous games in many different genres at once, rather than focusing on one segment of the business, as well as being largely funded by family money from its founders. While Dalloul planned for the company to become the United States' largest software developer, around 1997, the company scaled back its software ambitions, citing a drop in demand due to the Internet, reducing the company to 90 employees and pivoting to web development.

== Games developed ==
Year	Title	Platform(s)	Publisher
1995	Beyond the Wall: Stories Behind the Vietnam Wall	Windows; Macintosh	Fox Interactive
1995	Icebreaker	Windows; 3DO	Fox Interactive
1995	Chop Suey	Windows; Macintosh	Magnet Interactive Studios
