= Treehouse (game) =

Board game

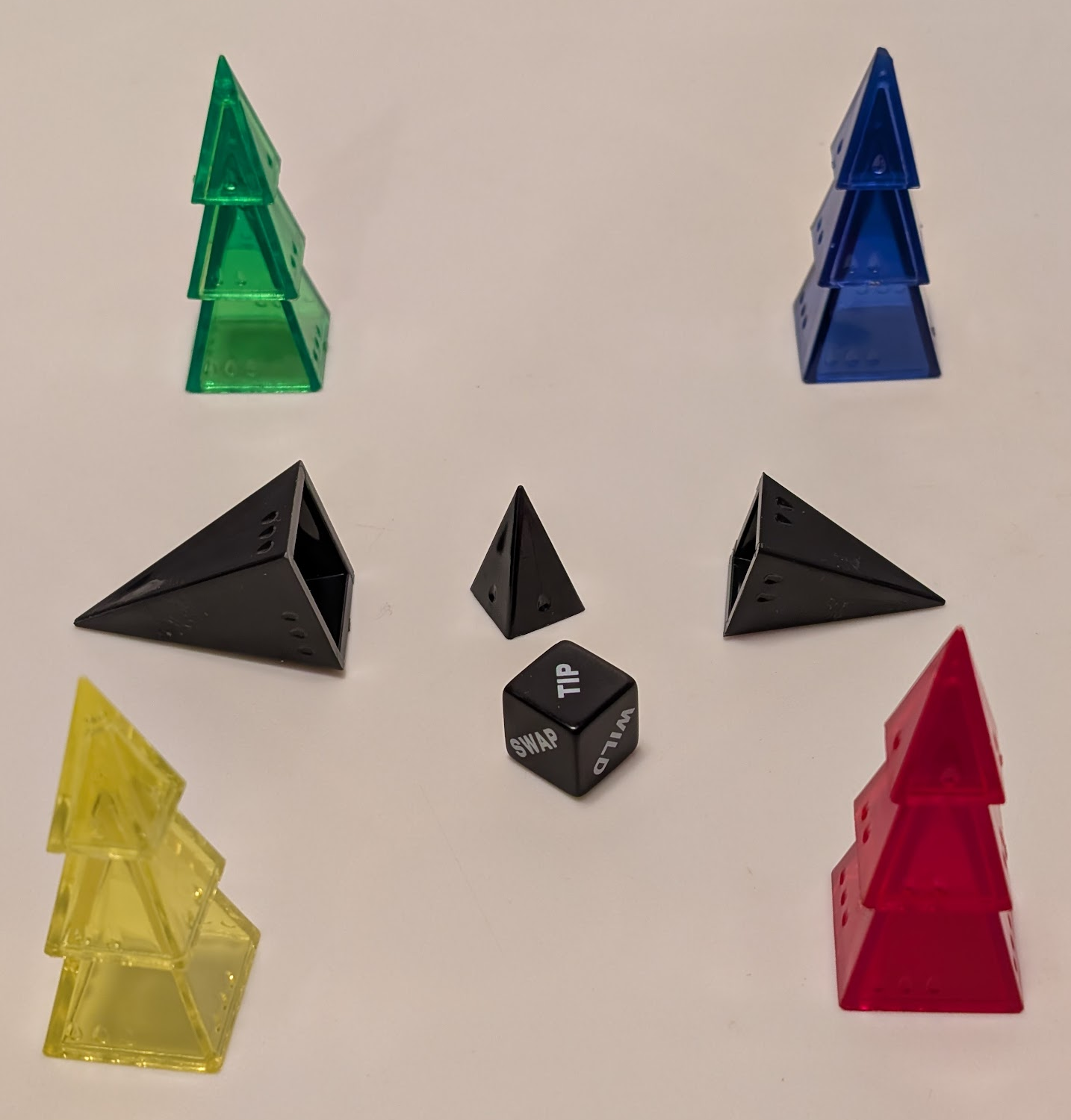
- Opening position of a 4-player game
- Designers: Andy Looney
- Publishers: Looney Labs
- Players: 2–4
- Setup time: < 5 minutes
- Playing time: 5–10 minutes
- Chance: High
- Age range: All ages
- Skills: Pattern recognition

Treehouse is an abstract game published by Looney Labs in 2006 in which players attempt to move their pieces to match the configuration of the central pyramids that are shared by all players.

== Description ==
=== Components ===
The game pieces are five sets of three pyramids graduated in size from small to large. One set is an opaque color, called "the House"; the other four sets are different clear colors. A special six-sided die with the words TIP, SWAP, DIG, AIM, HOP, and WILD is the only other game component.

=== Gameplay ===
The opaque set of pyramids is placed in the center of the table with the small one pointing straight up, while the medium and large pyramids are placed on opposite side of the small piece, both pointing away from it. Each player selects one of the other sets of pyramids, and stacks them from largest to smallest in the "Tree" formation.

The object of the game is for each player to maneuver their pieces so that they match the configuration of the House. The pyramids will always be in a line, and will either point up, or along the line to the left or right.

The first player rolls the die and must follow its command word only on their own trio:

- Tip: Knock over any upright piece or stack, either to the right or to the left. A stack them comes apart, its pieces all pointing in the direction they were tipped.
- Swap: Swap the locations of any two pieces, retaining each piece's orientation. The exception to this is that if one of the pieces enters a stack, and was not vertical before the move, it becomes vertical.
- Hop: Any upright piece can hop and land anywhere along the line, even between the other two pieces, remaining upright. If it lands on another piece, it causes a stack to form with the hopping piece on top.
- Dig: Any sideways piece tunnels down and either comes back upright anywhere along the line (including between the other two pieces or in its own spot.) If it comes up under another piece, that piece is reoriented to point up and is stacked on top of the tunneling piece.
- Aim: Reorient any piece, aiming it left, right or up.
- Wild: Choose any of the five commands and apply it to the player's trio or to the House.

If the player cannot legally follow the die's command on their own trio, they must apply the command to the House. If this is also not possible, the player rolls again.

The first player to match the House's current configuration is the winner.

== Publication history ==
In 1989, Andy Looney, his future wife Kristin Wunderlich, and John Cooper invented a game called Icehouse that used small stackable pyramids. Looney created many more games that used these sets of the pyramids, including Treehouse in 2006. The game was marketed in two color variants: Rainbow (opaque black, and clear blue, red, green, yellow) and Xeno (opaque white, and clear purple, cyan, orange, clear).

== Reception ==
Matthew Pook, writing for Pyramid, noted the brevity of the game, writing, "Like the best Looney Labs titles, Treehouse is both incredibly short and simple to play. Indeed, a game should not last more than five to 10 minutes, and upon our first play with just two players, the game lasted barely two minutes." Pook concluded, "Treehouse is mind-bogglingly easy to both learn and play, and easy to expand upon."

Jeff Provine called Treehouse a mix of skill and luck, writing "Logic is key, but social skills can become important as more players means room for ganging up on others. Even with all the skill in the world, the game comes down to luck since a roll of the die determines the game." Provine concluded that the game was a great gift "for those who enjoy deep thinking as well as the thrill of chance."

== Awards ==
Treehouse won the Origins Award for "Best Boardgame of 2006".
