= Looney Labs =

American game company

Looney Labs, Inc.
- Company type: Privately held corporation
- Industry: Gaming
- Predecessor: IceHouse Games, Inc.
- Founded: July 24, 1996 in College Park, Maryland
- Founders: Andrew Looney; Kristin Looney
- Headquarters: The Sterling Building, College Park, Maryland, United States
- Key people: Kristin Looney (CEO); Andrew Looney (CCO); Alison Frane (Head Factotum)
- Products: card games, Icehouse sets
- Brands: Fluxx; Looney Pyramids; Fully Baked Ideas
- Revenue: $1 million (2012)
- Owners: Andrew Looney; Kristin Looney
- Number of employees: 7 (2012)
- Website: looneylabs.com

Looney Labs, Inc. is a small game company based in College Park, Maryland, United States. It is named after its founders, Andrew Looney and Kristin Looney, and is best known for creating the Fluxx line of card games. The company has three U.S. patents and eight Origins Awards.

The company's games are distributed by ACD Distribution, Alliance Game Distributors and GTS for the U.S. hobby game market, Lion Rampant for Canada and Publisher Services, Inc. for U.S. mass market and book trade and the international market.

== Icehouse Games: predecessor company ==
Andrew and Kristin Looney previously entered game design and manufacturing with Icehouse Games which was started to manufacture pieces for the formerly fictional IceHouse game in 1989. In 1996, Looney shut down Icehouse Games, Inc. as the cost to create Icehouse pyramid molds would cost $12,000 and to focus on designing a card game.

== History ==
=== Home based ===
Andrew Looney soon designed the Fluxx card game. Looney Laboratories was launched in 1996 as a part-time home based design company soon adding a nearby storage unit as a warehouse. Fluxx was licensed out to Iron Crown Enterprises to publish. At the 1998 Origins International Game Expo and Fair in Columbus, Ohio, Looney launched its Aquarius card game. Proton and Q-Turn were design in 1998–1999. Alison Frane started working at Looney Labs with Fluxx using her artistic abilities. The company's November 1999 weekly web zine officially launched its Mad Lab Rabbit fan demo program.

Iron Crown went into bankruptcy thus the Looney triggered the license provision allowing the rights to revert to the company. Lab then decided to publish Fluxx in house instead of finding another publisher. Kristin Looney by 2000 quit her job to work full-time. By 2000, the company re-released Icehouse as Icehouse: The Martian Chess Set, released Chrononauts and a new printing of Fluxx (version 2.1). Icehouse sold poorly in stores while selling briskly on the company's website.

In summer 2001, ACMS, later renamed Print Mail Communications (PMC), took over from the storage unit as warehousing and distribution company. In 2001, IceHouse and Chrononauts both won Origins Awards 2000 while Looney Labs published Cosmic Coasters, Fluxx Blanxx, and Chrononauts: Lost Identities. Icehouse pieces were released as monochrome stash tubes in 2001.

Andrew Looney became full-time by 2002. Labs released in 2002 Nanofictionary, Are You a Werewolf? and a new Fluxx primary version. In 2003, the company expanded the Fluxx line with its first themed variant and a licensed German language version.

Looney Labs found in 2004 that an unaware Covenant Communications had published a rip-off of their game, Aquarius, as Search, Ponder, and Play! in 2003, for which Labs reached a licensing deal with Covenant. In 2004, the Zendo icehouse set won Best Abstract Board Game of 2003. while in 2005 the set won the Mensa Select Game Award.

=== Apartment based ===
Company offices moved to Janet's Attic, an attic apartment in their friends' house several blocks away in early 2005. By October 2005, EcoFluxx was in play testing while Just Desserts was in prototype, or beta stage.

Robin Vinopal joined the company in early 2006 becoming Chief Operating Officer, Treasurer, and member of the Board of Directors. In 2006, Lab revamped their Icehouse sets to the Treehouse main set plus two color schemes and also released Martian Coasters. With the 2007 publishing of Zombie Fluxx the first new type of card, Creeper, is introduced. Also in 2007, the Mad Rabbits fan/demo program was shut down.

With Frane's purchase of a house, Pepperland, in 2008, the company moved into its basement apartment. Product wise that year, Labs released edition 4 Fluxx and worked with Toy Vault to release Monty Python Fluxx. The company began using a standard two-part box instead of to-fit tuck box for a consistent look and shelving ease.

In 2009, Looney Labs published one new card game, Are You the Traitor?, another Fluxx variant, new editions of its two other card games and a few expansion sets while starting to use a postcard promo card for marketing. The company on July 1, 2009 started distributing through Publisher Services, Inc. for international accounts, and to the book trade. On November 13, 2009, Labs launched its Full Baked Ideas imprint with a new edition of Stoner Fluxx and expectations for a drinking variant of Fluxx.

The Back to the Future: The Card Game was released in 2010 along with two Fluxx re-releases in the new box format. Two new Fluxx variants debuted in 2011 that saw the IceHouse pyramids re-released with a new lead game set, IceDice. The company's fan/demo club was restarted in 2011.

The company on January 5, 2012 reduced the number of distribution companies that they ship through to ACD Distribution and Alliance Game Distributors for the US hobby game market, Lion Rampant for Canada and Publisher Services, Inc. for U.S. mass market and book trade and the international market. ACD and Alliance would also make their supporting material available via subscription.

On August 1, 2012, Looney Labs got a simplified less expensive general market version with redesigned packaging of Fluxx into Target stores. On February 7, 2013, Labs released the 2.0 edition of Nanofictionary as a print on demand product.

=== Office based ===
In August 2013, the company moved from Pepperland basement to the top floor of The Sterling Building, an actual office complex. In May 2015, Labs changed its fulfillment company from PMC to Excel. Lab added in mid-2015 GTS as another distributor.

Loonacy was released in March 2014 and won the Parents' Choice FunStuff Award Spring 2014 Games. While two other Loonacy versions were released in the next two following years.

In 2017, Looney Labs had multiple releases with three Fully Baked Ideas summer releases of variants of existing games, a revived Nanofictionary version, a few variants of Fluxx including Chemistry Fluxx and Zendo. In December 2017, the company reissued Zendo game separate from the Looney pyramids line for the first time.

Graphic artist Mary Engelbreit was signed to a licensing deal in February 2018 with Looney Labs' for versions of Fluxx and Loonacy games to be released in the third quarter 2018. Two second quarter games were also scheduled, a new Fluxx set and Get the MacGuffin card game.

== Games ==
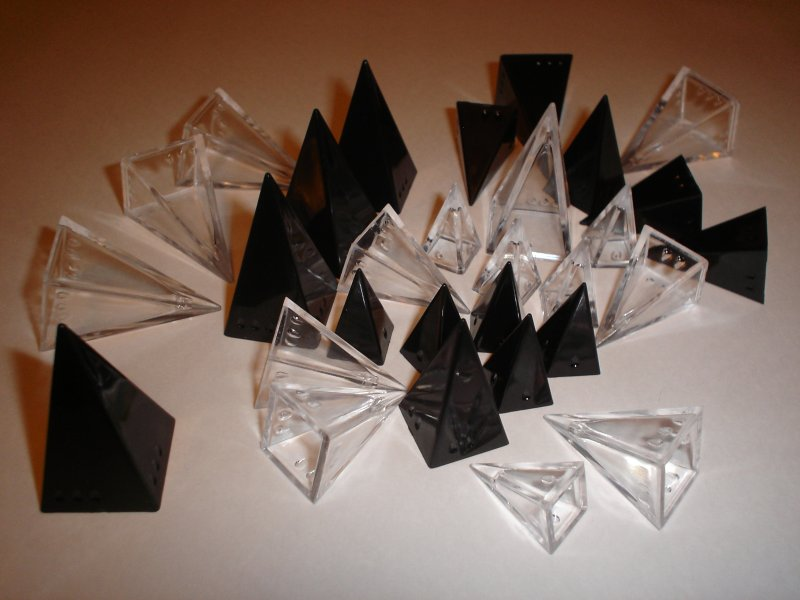
A completed game of Icehouse

- Fluxx (1996) designed by Andrew Looney, whose rules and goals change as the result of its players' actions, Mensa Select Game Award 1999
  - Eco-Fluxx (October 2005)
  - Oz Fluxx
  - Zombie Fluxx (2007) 2008 Origins Award for Traditional Card Game of the Year
  - Fluxx: The Board Game (2013) Parents' Choice Recommended Seal Fall 2013 Games
- Aquarius
  - 1st edition (1998)
  - 2nd edition (2009)
  - Seven Dragons (2011) Aquarius variant with art from Larry Elmore
- Proton (1998)
- Q-Turn (1999)
- Icehouse pieces (see for additional releases)
  - The Martian Chess Set (1999) Origins Award for Best Abstract Board Game 2000
  - monochrome stash tubes (2001)
  - Treehouse (2006) 2007 Origins Award for Board Game or Expansion of the Year
  - Looney Pyramids (June 2011)
- Chrononauts (see for additional releases)
  - 1st edition (2000) time travel themed card game designed by Andrew Looney, Parents' Choice Silver Honors 2001 Games, Origins Award for Best Traditional Card Game 2000
  - Early American Chrononauts (2004)
  - Back to the Future: The Card Game variant (by September 11, 2010) art by Derek Ring, won 2011 Origins Award for Best Traditional Card Game
  - Star Trek Chrono-Trek (August 1, 2019)
- Cosmic Coasters (2001) Origins Award: best abstract strategy board game 2001
- Nanofictionary
  - 1.0 edition (2002) Parents Choice Silver Honors 2003
  - 2.0 edition (February 7, 2013) print on demand product via DriveThruCards.com
  - 3.0 edition (August 17, 2017)
  - Nanofictionary Blanks (August 2018) pack of blank cards
- Are You a Werewolf? (2002)
  - Are You a Werewolf? Deluxe edition (2012)
- Are You the Traitor? (July 10, 2009) deception party game designed by Andrew Looney, won Origins Award for 2009 Best New Children's, Family, or Party Game
- Choose One (October 2013)
- Loonacy: The Maniacal Matching Card Game (March 2014) 100 double image cards from the Fluxx sets; Parents' Choice FunStuff Award Spring 2014 Games
  - Retro (October 2, 2015)
  - Uglydoll (April 16, 2016) licensed characters(September 6, 2018)
  - Mary Engelbreit (September 6, 2018) art by Mary Engelbreit
- Just Desserts
  - Beta edition (2005)
  - First edition (April 10, 2015)
  - Better with Bacon expansion (January 26, 2017) 10 new cards, 6 dessert, 4 bacon-related customers
- Mad Libs: The Game (March 31, 2016) variant of the Penguin Young Readers word game and book series
- Zendo (December 2017) 2nd edition
  - Zendo Rules Expansion #1 (August 2018) 10-card set has 5 difficult, 3 medium and 1 easy secret rules that make up to 45 different rules.
- Get the MacGuffin (April 5, 2018)
  - Plan C expansion (announced)
- Time Breaker (February 28, 2019)

=== Fully Baked Ideas ===
Fully Baked Ideas is Looney Labs's mature publishing imprint.

- Stoner Fluxx 2nd Edition (November 13, 2009) with 5% of proceeds going to end marijuana prohibition groups; 100 cards
- Drinking Fluxx (July 24, 2017)
- Adult Mad Libs: The Game (June 22, 2017)
- Stoner Loonacy (May 25, 2017) uses images from Stoner Fluxx for this version of the company's matching game
