= List of games with concealed rules =

Games with concealed rules are games where the rules are intentionally concealed from new players, either because their discovery is part of the game itself, or because the game is a hoax and the rules do not exist. In fiction, the counterpart of the first category are games that supposedly do have a rule set, but that rule set is not disclosed.

== Actual games ==
=== Discovery games ===
- Eleusis: A card game in which one player secretly decides on a rule which determines which cards may be played on top of each other. The other players then use deductive logic to work out the secret rule.
- Game Changer: A game show in which the rules and objectives change from episode to episode.
- Haggle: A party game in which the gamemaster divides a set of cards and a subset of the full rules among players and allows them to trade for other cards and rules.
- Mao: A shedding-type card game where the winner of a round adds a concealed rule of their choice to all subsequent rounds.
- Paranoia: A tabletop role-playing game in which the rules are considered "classified". Only the gamemaster has full knowledge of the rules, while other players must deduce them by trial and error as they proceed through the game. (The game acknowledges that players may read the gamemaster section, but demonstrating knowledge of the rules is considered treasonous, and the gamemaster may also make arbitrary changes.)
- Penultima: A chess variant in which the spectators make secret rules governing how the pieces move and capture. The two players are unaware of the rules and must discover them by inductive reasoning.
- Psychiatrist: In variants of this game, players who do not know the concealed rules ask the other players personal questions and try to infer the rules from the answers and from the fact that players who know the concealed rules occasionally shout "Psychiatrist!" and switch seats.
- Scissors: A party game in which a pair of scissors is passed between players, with the passer declaring that they are being passed "open" or "closed" based on an individual and secret rule. The other players must use observation to deduce the rule each player uses to make the declaration.
- Whose Triangle Is It?: A party game in which one player points to three people or objects, forming an imaginary triangle, and then asks "Whose triangle is it?" The triangle belongs to the first person to speak after the triangle is drawn, but this rule is not told to new players, and the game is for new players to figure out what the rule is.
- Zendo: A game in which one player creates a rule for structures to follow and the other players try to discover the rule by building structures

=== Hoax or joke games ===
- 52 Pickup: A card game in which dealer scatters the cards on the floor and non-dealer must pick them up.
- Mornington Crescent: Originally a round in the BBC Radio 4 comedy panel game I'm Sorry I Haven't A Clue. The game consists of each panelist in turn announcing a landmark or street, most often a tube station on the London Underground system. The apparent aim is to be the first to announce "Mornington Crescent", a station on the Northern Line. Despite appearances, however, there are no rules to the game, and both the naming of stations and the specification of "rules" are based on stream-of-consciousness association and improvisation.

== Games in works of fiction ==
=== Games with undisclosed rules ===
- 43-Man Squamish: Mad magazine published an article outlining a college sport designed to be unplayable. The sport features a pentagonal field, silly-sounding terms and a dummy on each team.
- Calvinball: In the comic strip Calvin & Hobbes, Calvinball is a game regularly played by the main characters. The only consistent rule of Calvinball is that "Calvinball may never be played with the same rules twice".
- Double Fanucci: Featured in the computer game Zork Zero, Double Fanucci has mind-bogglingly complex "rules". Legal play can depend on things like the phase of the Moon and the ancestry of the players.

=== Hoax games ===
- Numberwang: A recurring "game show" on the sketch series That Mitchell and Webb Look. Similar to Mornington Crescent above, the "contestants" call out random numbers in an attempt to score a "Numberwang", though the responses are scripted and there are no actual rules to winning a "Numberwang".
- Fizzbin: In the Star Trek episode "A Piece of the Action", James T. Kirk created this game while he and Commander Spock were being held prisoner. They "taught" the game to the guards, improvising the rules until their captors were sufficiently distracted, then overpowered them and escaped.
- Cups: In the Friends episode "The One on the Last Night", Chandler invents the card game Cups, making up the result of each card turn in an attempt to give Joey money after he refuses a handout.

== See also ==
- List of fictional games
