= Zendo (disambiguation) =

Zendo may refer to:

- Zendō, a Japanese meditation hall
- Zendo (game), a game of inductive logic
- Shandao (a.k.a. Zendō), an influential Buddhist writer in the 7th Century
