= 1000 Blank White Cards =

Party game

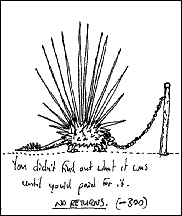
- A sample card in the typical 3 by 2.5 inches (7.6 cm × 6.4 cm) US format.
- Years active: 1996 to present
- Genres: Party game Card game Nomic
- Players: Variable
- Setup time: Variable
- Playing time: Variable
- Chance: Variable
- Skills: Cartooning, Irony

1000 Blank White Cards is a party card game played with cards in which the deck is created as part of the game. Though it has been played by adults in organized groups worldwide, 1000 Blank White Cards is also described as well-suited for children in Hoyle's Rules of Games. Since any game rules are contained on the cards (rather than existing as all-encompassing rules or in a rulebook), 1000 Blank White Cards can be considered a sort of nomic. It can be played by any number of players and provides the opportunity for card creation and gameplay outside the scope of a single sitting. Creating new cards during the game, dealing with previous cards' effects, is allowed, and rule modification is encouraged as an integral part of gameplay.

== Game ==
The game consists of whatever the players define it as by creating and playing things. There are no initial rules, and while there may be conventions among certain groups of players, it is in the spirit of the game to spite and denounce these conventions, as well as to adhere to them religiously.

For many typical players, though, the game may be split into three logical parts: the deck creation, the play itself, and the epilogue.

=== Deck creation ===
A deck of cards consists of any number of cards, generally of a uniform size and of rigid enough paper stock that they may be reused. Some may bear artwork, writing or other game-relevant content created during past games, with a reasonable stock of cards that are blank at the start of gameplay. Some time may be taken to create cards before gameplay commences, although card creation may be more dynamic if no advance preparation is made, and it is suggested that the game be simply sprung upon a group of players, who may or may not have any idea what they are being caught up in. If the game has been played before, all past cards can be used in gameplay unless the game specifies otherwise, but perhaps not until the game has allowed them into play.

A typical group's conventions for deck creation follow:

Though cards are created at all times throughout the game (except the epilogue), it is necessary to start with at least some cards pre-made. Despite the name of the game, a deck of 80 to 150 cards is usual, depending on the desired duration of the game, and of these approximately half will be created before the start of play. If a group doesn't already possess a partial deck they may choose to start with fewer cards and to create most of the deck during play.

Whether or not the group possesses a deck already (from previous games), they will usually want to add a few more cards, so the first phase of the game involves each player creating six or seven new cards to add to the deck. See structure of a card below.

When the deck is ready, all of the cards (including blanks) are shuffled together and each player is dealt five cards. The remainder of the deck is placed in the centre of the table.

=== Play ===
The rules of game are determined as the game is played. There exists no fixed order of play or limit to the length or scope of the game. Such parameters may be set within the game but are of course subject to alteration.

One sample convention suggests the following:

Play proceeds clockwise beginning with the player on the dealer's left. On each player's turn, he/she draws a card from the central deck and then plays a card from his/her hand. Cards can be played to any player (including the person playing the card), or to the table (so that it affects everyone). Cards with lasting effects, such as awarding points or changing the game's rules, are kept on the table to remind players of those effects. Cards with no lasting effects, or cards that have been nullified, are placed in a discard pile.

Blank cards can be made into playable cards at any time simply by drawing on them (see structure of a card).

Play continues until there are no cards left in the central deck and no one can play (if they have no cards that can be played in the current situation). The "winner" is the player with the highest score of total points at the end of the game, though in some games points don't actually matter.

=== Epilogue ===
Since the cards created in any game may be used as the beginning of a deck for a future game, many players like to reduce the deck to a collection of their favourites. The epilogue is simply an opportunity for the players to collectively decide which cards to keep and which to discard (or set aside as not-for-play).

Many players believe that having their own cards favoured during the epilogue is the true "victory" of 1000 Blank White Cards, although the game's creator has never discarded or destroyed a card unless that action was specified within the scope of the game. Retaining and replaying those cards which seem at the moment less than perfect can help reduce a certain stagnation and tendency to over-think that can otherwise overtake the game's momentum.

One group of players in Boston (not the long-dispersed Harvard cadre) have introduced the idea of the "Suck Box":

We don't like to destroy cards, even if they suck, so we have a notecard box called The Suck Box. If a player feels a card is boring and useless to gameplay, they will nominate it for admission to The Suck Box. All players present then vote (sometimes lobbying for their cases), and the card either goes into The Suck Box or gets to remain in the primary deck. Ironically, when The Suck Box was introduced, one player created a card for the express purpose of adding it to The Suck Box. However, the rest of us felt that it was too amusing a card and had to remain in the deck.

== Structure of a card ==
At its simplest, a card is just that: a physical card, which may or may not have undergone any modifications. Its role in the game is both as itself and as whatever information it carries, which can be changed, erased or amended. The cards used vary widely in size, from the original 1 1/2-by-3 1/2-inch (3.8 cm × 8.9 cm) Vis-Ed brand flash cards, to half or full index cards, to simply sheets of A7 sized paper. Cards may be created with any marking medium and need not conform to any conventions of size or content unless specified within the scope of the game. Cards have been made of a wide range of substances, and modifying the shape or composition of a card is entirely acceptable: the original Vis-Ed box still contains a card, created by Plan 9 From Bell Labs developer Mycroftiv, to which a tablet of zinc has been affixed with adhesive tape; the card reads "Eat This!... In a few minutes, the ZINC will be entering your system." Many cards have been created which demanded their own modification, destruction or duplication, and many have been created which display nothing but a picture or text bearing no explicit significance whatsoever. Some have been eaten, burned, or cut and folded into other shapes.

The game does tend to fall into structural conventions, of which the following is a good example:

A card consists (usually) of a title, a picture and a description of its effect. The title should uniquely identify the card. The picture can be as simple as a stick figure, or as complex as the player likes. The description, or rule, is the part that affects the game. It can award or deny points, cause a player to miss a turn, change the direction of play, or do anything the player can think of. The rules written on cards in play make up the majority of the game's total ruleset.

In practice, these conventions can generate rather monotonous decks of one panel cartoons bearing point values, rules or both. As conceived, the game is far broader, as it is not inherently limited in length or scope, is radically self-modifying, and can contain references to, or actual instances of, other games or activities. The game can also encode algorithms (trivially functioning as a Turing machine), store real-world data, and hold or refer to non-card objects.

== History ==
The game was originally created late in 1995 by Nathan McQuillen of Madison, Wisconsin. He was inspired by seeing a product at a local coffeehouse: a box of 1000 Vis-Ed brand blank white flash cards. He introduced "The game of 1000 blank white cards" a few days later into a mixed group including students, improvisational theatre members and club kids. Initial play sessions were frequent and high energy, but a fire consumed the regular venue shortly after the game's introduction. The game physically survived but with the loss of their regular meeting place the majority of the original players fell out of contact with one another, and soon most had moved on to other cities.

The game started to spread as a meme through various social networks, mostly collegiate, in the late 1990s. Aaron Mandel, a former Madison resident, brought the game to Harvard University and started an active playgroup which changed the size of the cards to the more standard half-index dimensions (2 1/2 by 3 1/2 inches [6.4 cm × 8.9 cm]). Boston players Dave Packer and Stewart King created the first web content representing the game. Their graduation served to further spread the game to the west coast and onto the web. Subsequently, an article in GAMES Magazine and inclusion in the 2001 revision of Hoyle's Rules of Games established the game as an independent part of gaming culture. Various celebrities have also contributed cards to the game, including musicians Ben Folds and Jonatha Brooke, and cartoonist Bill Plympton.

The game's inventor and its original players have frequently expressed amusement at the spread of a game they regarded mostly as a brilliant but highly idiosyncratic bit of conceptual humor which provided them with an excuse to draw goofy cartoons.

== See also ==
- Calvinball
- Discordianism
- Fluxx
- Mao (game)
- Nomic
