= Shotgunning =

Drinking technique

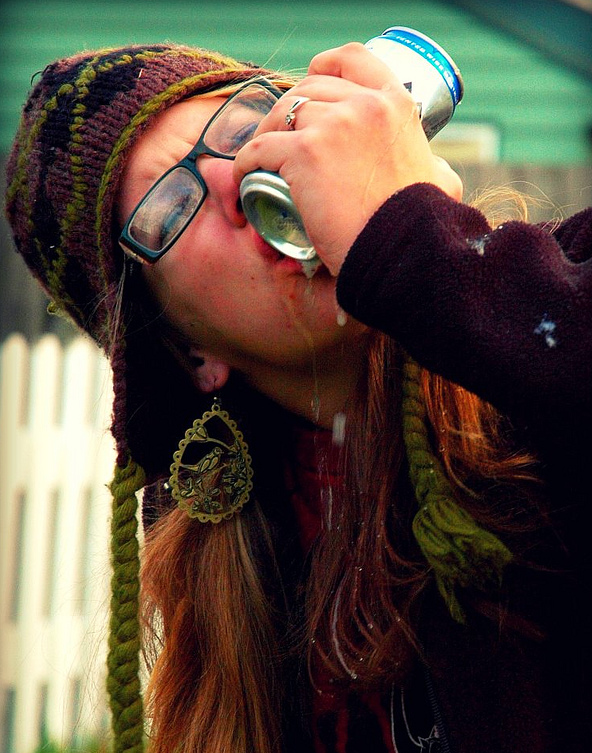
A woman shotgunning a can of beer

Shotgunning is a means of consuming a beverage, especially beer, very quickly by punching a hole in the side of the can, near the bottom, placing the mouth over the hole, and pulling the tab to open the top. The beverage quickly drains, and is quickly consumed.

Shotgunning is normally done as a competition. The participants wait until all the others are ready before the countdown begins. Once the countdown is finished, the participants get under way and the first one to finish consuming the beverage is the winner.

== Technique ==
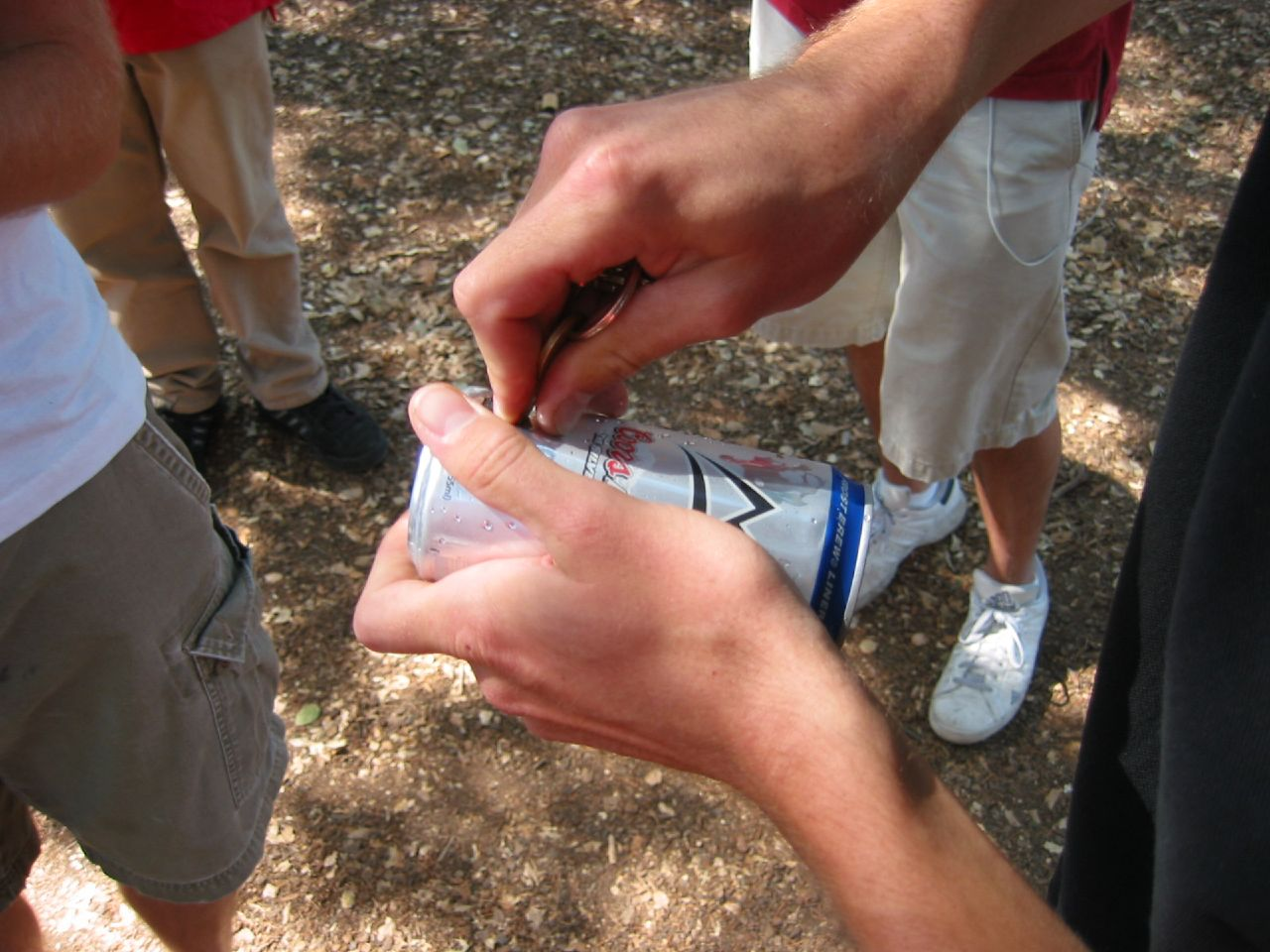
Punching a hole in a can with a key

To shotgun a beverage, a small hole is punched in the side of the can, close to the bottom. In order to prevent the liquid from spilling out while the cut is made, the can is held horizontally and the hole is made resulting in an air pocket. The hole can be made with any sharp object—typically a key, bottle opener, pen, knife, or tooth. The drinker then places their mouth over the hole while rotating the can straight up. When the can’s tab is pulled, the liquid will quickly drain through the hole into the drinker’s mouth. This occurs because the hole allows air to enter the can, balancing the internal pressure and enabling the liquid to flow rapidly without resistance from carbonation or a vacuum.

== See also ==
- Beer bong – Drinking device composed of a funnel and attached tube
- Binge drinking – Form of excessive alcohol intake
- Drinking culture – Aspect of human behavior
- Keg stand – Drinking game
