= Bartok (card game) =

Australian card game

- Type: Shedding-type
- Players: 2+ (best 6)
- Skills: Tactics, Deduction
- Cards: 52
- Deck: French
- Rank (high→low): A K Q J 10 9 8 7 6 5 4 3 2 (modifiable)
- Play: Clockwise and Counter-clockwise
- Playing time: 20 min (variable)
- Chance: Medium

Related games
- Crazy Eights; Mao

The game of Bartok, also known by a number of other names, such as Wartoke, Warthog, Bartog, Bentok, Last One Standing or Bong 98, is a card game popular in Australia where the winner of each round invents a new rule which must be obeyed for the remainder of the game. It belongs to the "shedding" or Eights family of card games, whereby each player tries to rid themselves of all of their cards. The game progresses through a series of rounds with a new rule being added in each round, thus making the game increasingly complex as it progresses. These newly introduced rules may modify any existing rules.

== Gameplay ==
The game of Bartok consists of several rounds of play. The winner of each round creates a new rule which remains in play for future rounds of the game.

The players sit in a circle and the cards are placed face down in the center and mixed. Each player then picks up either five or seven cards, by agreement. A single card is then flipped to face up to start the discard pile. The rest of the face down cards form the draw pile. Any player may then play on that card, providing such a play is legal. One of the players to the left or right of that person then plays, to determine the direction of play. It is also possible to use a dealer, who deals the cards to each player in the usual manner. In this case, play follows to the left of the dealer.

In the first round, a player may discard a card face up on the discard pile which has either the same suit or face value of the top card of the discard pile. At that point, play moves on to the next player. Plays must be made in a timely manner or face a penalty. If a player cannot or does not wish to make a legal play, they instead pick up a card from the draw pile, and this also ends their turn. In some games, if a player has just drawn a card to end their turn which could have legally been played, they may jump in with that card before the next player has played.

A round ends when any player has no cards left. That player is declared the winner of the round and is permitted to create a new rule for the next round. If a player has only one card left, they must say "Bartok" or receive a penalty. This applies even if a player gets down to one card by non-standard means, such as trading hands with someone else. If the draw pile runs out before a round ends, all but the top card of the discard pile is flipped over to form the new draw pile. The game usually ends when several rules combine to make continued play impossible.

The game has no overall winner or ending condition, only a series of winners of each round.

=== Creating new rules ===
New rules are introduced to Bartok by the winner of each round, making the game more complex as it progresses. The creator must tell the other players what this rule is. Rules cannot be specific to particular players (such as "skip Bill every turn") and cannot remove or alter a rule introduced in a previous round, unless that is the wish of every player. Additionally, if there is a unanimous veto, that is, every player bar the creator vetoes a new rule, then the rule is not used and the creator must think of another. Commonly, there is a time out rule, whereby if players need clarification during a round of a newly introduced rule, they may call time out and discuss it.

Almost all rules are of the form "if (trigger) then (consequence)", for example "If a 7 is played, reverse the direction of play." Common triggers include the ranks, faces and colours of played cards (and how those values relate to the current top card), and changes between suits and parities (odd to even, even to odd), but they may also be triggered by non-card events such as speaking (or failing to speak) a certain word when playing a card. Consequences are often simply "this card may not be played", but may alternatively include the drawing of extra cards, the swapping of cards between players' hands, and alterations to the turn sequence. Bartok can be made into a drinking game if the consequence of a play is that a player must take a drink.

Many rules can be made cumulative. For example, "If a 7 is played, the next player picks up two cards and forfeits their turn or plays another 7. If they play another 7, the player after them picks up 4 cards and forfeits their turn or plays another 7, etc." Generally, it is desirable to have the more complex rules on a rarer trigger so that the players are not overly taxed by any one rule. The very best rules are creative, playable and fun.

=== Penalties ===
A penalty of one card is awarded for a number of illegal actions in Bartok. Anyone may award penalties in Bartok, although only one penalty may be awarded to a player for any given action, so if two people simultaneously accuse player X of the same action, only one of the penalties holds. Penalties do not end a player's turn. For example, if awarded a Too Slow penalty the player must still either play or pick up. Below is a typical list of penalties.

- Question: For a player who asks a question or started to ask a question. It does not matter if the question is relevant to the game or not. Sometimes this penalty may be dealt to an observer not playing the game - thus immediately involving them in the game.
- Incorrect Play: For a player who plays illegally during their turn.
- Out of Turn: For a player who plays when it is not their turn.
- Too Slow: For a player who does not play in a timely manner. This penalty can be issued multiple times during one turn if the player is extraordinarily slow. As a rough guide, leave about 3 seconds between each Too Slow issued.
- Failure to say "Bartok": For a player who has only one card left but has not said "Bartok". In many circles, these are issued very quickly after the player reaches one card, since they should say "Bartok" directly after playing their last card. If a player wins the round without saying "Bartok" and without being caught, they still win the round. The penalty is not awarded retroactively.
- False Accusation: For a player who accuses another player of a penalty incorrectly.

== Mao ==
As with other combination shedding and guessing games such as Mao, the rules can become quite complex. The similarity between Mao and Bartok is such that the two games are sometimes referred to by the other's name. The principal difference is that in Mao, a substantial set of rules is maintained between games, whereas in Bartok, this is only true of the minimal initial set of rules. Further, in those variants of Mao where rules are added between rounds, those rules are usually added silently and must be deduced by other players, whereas in Bartok the new rules are told to everyone. This allows the rules of Bartok to be substantially more technical than the rules of Mao, since the details of the rules can be discussed.

== See also ==
- Uno (card game)
- Asshole (card game)
- Kings (card game)
- Nomic
- List of games with concealed rules
