= 2003 Origins Award winners =

The following are the winners of the 29th annual Origins Award, held in 2003:

Category	Winner	Company
Game of the Year	Indy HeroClix	WizKids Games
Abstract Board Game	Zendo	Looney Labs
Board Game Expansion	Zombies 3: Mallwalkers	Twilight Creations
Card Game Expansion	Game of Thrones: Ice & Fire Expansion	Fantasy Flight Games
Fantasy Miniatures Rules	Warmachine	Privateer Press
Fantasy Miniatures Series	Warmachine	Privateer Press
Fiction, Long	Book of Final Flesh	Eden Studios
Fiction, Short	Podo and the Magic Shield	WizKids Games
Fiction, Graphic	Everybody Loves Gilly	Dork Storm
Periodical	Dragon magazine	Paizo Publishing
Book Design	Redhurst Academy of Magic	Human Head
Card Design	Bang!	Mayfair Games
Board Design	A Game of Thrones	Fantasy Flight Games
Historical Board Game	Attack!	Eagle Games
Historical Miniatures Rules	El Cid	Warhammer Historical
Historical Miniatures Series	28mm Ancient Celts	Renegade Miniatures
Miniatures Accessories or Terrain	Aurora Class Drop Ship	WizKids Games
Play-by-Mail	Starweb	Flying Buffalo
Role-Playing Game Adventure	Black Sails over Freeport	Green Ronin Publishing
Role-Playing Game	Angel	Eden Studios
Role-Playing Game Supplement	Redhurst Academy of Magic	Human Head
Sci-Fi Miniatures Rules	Shadowrun Duels	WizKids Games
Sci-Fi Miniatures Series	Mechwarrior Liao Incursion	WizKids Games
TCG	.hack//enemy	Decipher
Traditional Board	A Game of Thrones	Fantasy Flight Games
Traditional Card Game	Bang!	Mayfair Games
Gamers' Choice Awards
Board Game	A Game of Thrones	Fantasy Flight Games
Card Game	Munchkin Fu	Steve Jackson Games
Role-Playing Game	Savage Worlds	Pinnacle
Miniatures	WarMachine	Privateer Press
Periodical	Knights of the Dinner Table	Kenzer & Company
Play-by-Mail	Middle-Earth Play-By-Mail	Game Systems, Inc.
Game Aid	Bag o’ Zombies	Twilight Creations
Electronic	Pyramid Online	Steve Jackson Games
Historical	Settlers of the Stone Age	Mayfair Games

== Hall of Fame inductees ==
- Larry Bond
- Bob Charrette
- Ed Greenwood
- Reiner Knizia
- Klaus Teuber
- Loren Wiseman

== Hall of Fame Game inductees ==
- Squad Leader
- Warhammer 40K
