= Baseball (drinking game) =

Drinking game

Drinking Game
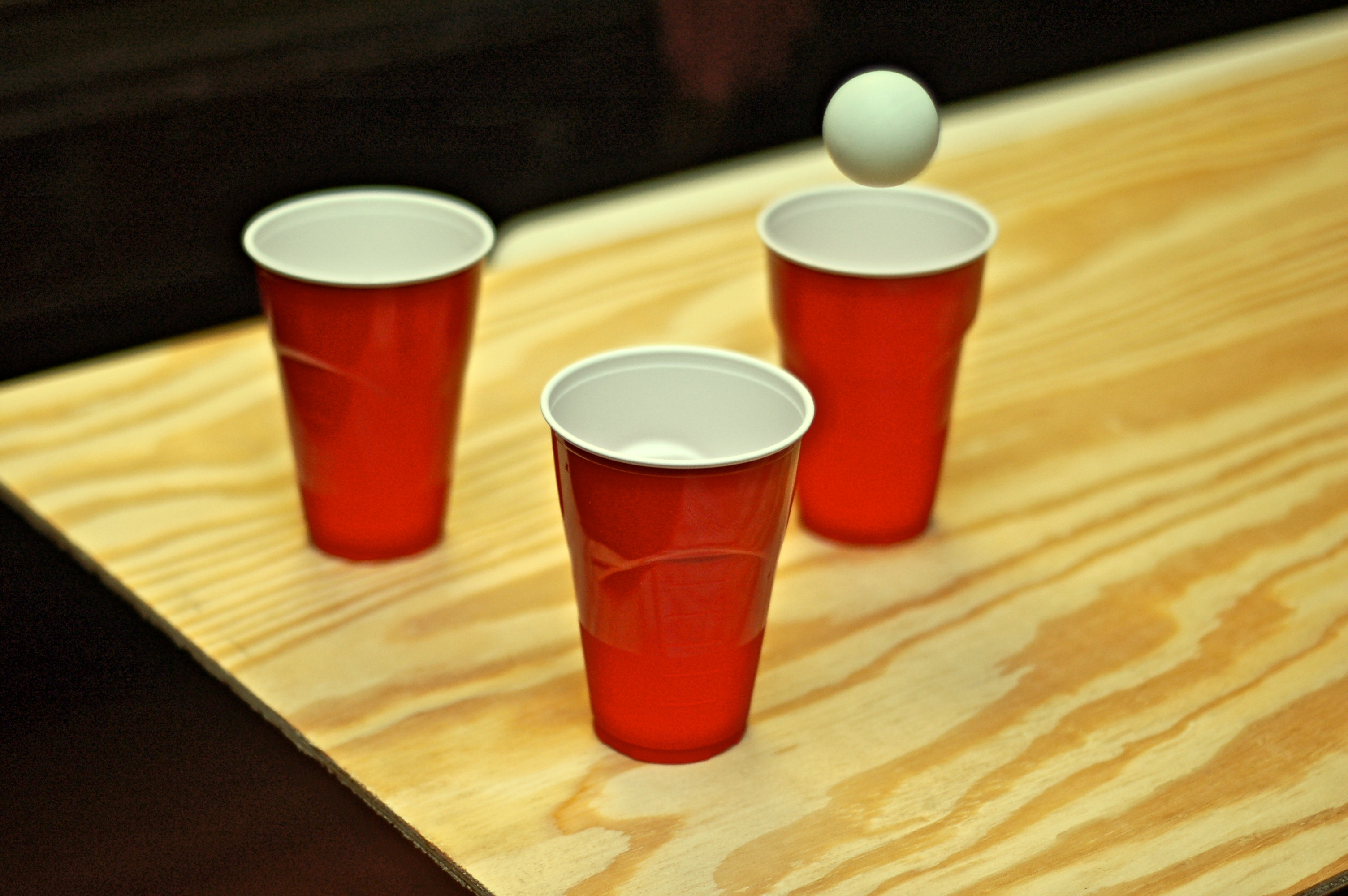
- Players: Typically two teams of even numbers
- Setup time: 2 minutes
- Playing time: 1-2 hours or less
- Chance: Easy
- Skills: Aiming, flipping cups, chugging, catching

Baseball is an American drinking game in which players shoot a quarter or another coin across a table with the intent of landing the ball in one of several cups of beer on the other end. Gameplay combines elements of beer pong and flip cup. The game typically consists of two teams of even numbers, one on each side of a table, and four cups set up on each side. The cups are lined up in a straight line representing the bases with the last cup at the edge of the table.

When a ball lands in a cup, the defending team must consume all of the beer inside that cup and all the cups below it, e.g. if the third cup is hit (a triple), the third, second and first cup are consumed. The cups are filled according to their position on the table. The cup closest to the opposing team is 1/4 full, the second cup is 1/2 full, the third cup is 3/4 full and the final cup nearest the edge is full. It is also common to have a glass of water with the purpose of cleaning the ball between throws. After consumption the cup is refilled to the appropriate level and placed back on the table.

The game consists of nine innings in which each team gets to "bat." if a ball is thrown and does not hit or land in a cup this is an out. Each team gets three outs per inning. The team with the greatest score after nine innings is considered the winner. Variation: the game can be played using "little league" rules in which the game is over after six innings. Variation: if a ball is thrown and hits a cup it may be caught by "fielders" prior to touching the table or floor for an out.

== Setup ==
Fourteen cups are needed, seven for each team, four representing the bases, then three on each side of the table representing bases for baserunners. The four cups representing the bases are lined up in a straight line with the last cup at the edge of the table. The cups for flip cup are placed near the center of the table so that judging who won the flip cup can be done easily.

=== Teams ===
Baseball is usually played with two teams of even numbers, though it can be played by an odd number so long as the relative drinking/playing strengths are even. Each team begins with two captains who pick their team in an alternating fashion. The captain who picks second then chooses whether to be home (shoot second) or away (shoot first.)

=== Playing field ===
The game is typically played on either a ping pong table or a folding banquet table. In general, this will be a plywood board cut to proper size, sometimes painted with sports, school, or fraternity symbols and given a liquid-proof coating.

=== Equipment ===
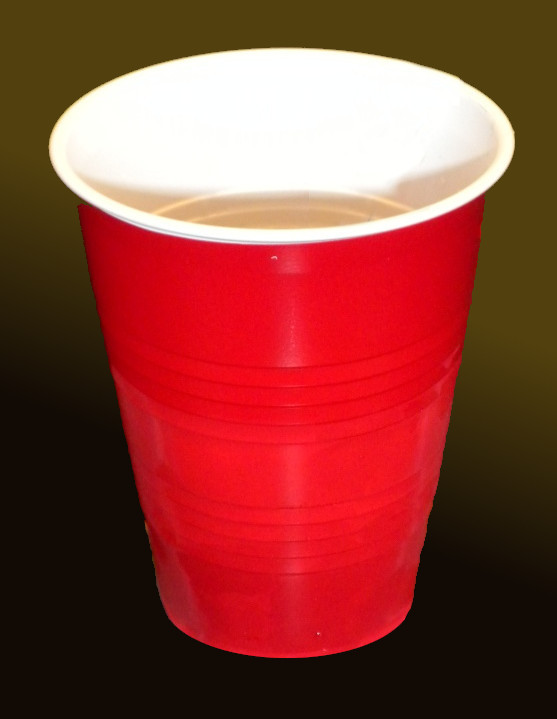
Disposable red plastic cup with ridge lines

The most common cups used are 16-ounce disposable plastic cups with ridge-lines which can be used precisely to measure the amount of beer to be poured into the cup. 38 mm or 40 mm table tennis (ping pong) balls are typically used for game play.

=== Alcohol ===
Usually an inexpensive light beer is used because of the large quantities of beer which may be consumed during the course of several games. You may or may not get belligerently drunk from playing baseball, and it usually devolves into a contact sport by the 7th inning stretch.

== Game play ==
Game play proceeds much like a game of beer pong. The team that is up shoots the ball until they accumulate three outs, via getting 3 strikes (by missing the cups), being caught out (which can occur when a ball bounces off a cup and the opposing team catches it), or being thrown out stealing. At this point the other team begins to shoot. After nine innings the score is calculated and the team with more runs wins.

=== At bat ===
Four cups are arranged so that the farthest cup is touching the far edge of the table. The cups are arranged vertically and touching so that each cup is one cup's diameter closer to the person "at bat." The cups are filled with beer so that the "single cup" (being the cup closest to the batter) is filled 1/4 of the way. The "double cup" is filled to half. The "triple cup" is filled to 3/4, and the "home run cup" is filled all the way.

If a player lands the ball in a cup the opposing team must consume that cup and all cups below it, e.g. the second cup is hit (a double) so the second and first cup are consumed. The cups are refilled to the appropriate line and placed back in formation.

Each player gets three attempts (strikes) to get a hit (make the ball in one of those cups). A miss (hitting a cup without an opposing team member catching it) is considered a strike. The opposing team can field the batter out by catching a foul ball (as described above). If the player misses all the cups during any shot in the at bat it is considered an out.

If a person shoots out of order just like in baseball if caught the shooter is not out but the person that was skipped is out.

=== Base running ===
When a player makes a cup they are said to be on base. Three cups must be set up as bases: The "first base" cup must be filled 1/2 of the way full; the "second base" cup is to be filled 3/4 full; the "third base" cup is full. A designated "catcher" from the fielding team must also have a cup that is filled to 1/3. A base runner advances to the base corresponding to his at bat. A single puts him on first base, a double onto second base, etc. There are two ways to advance a runner: the runner can advance by the at bat player hitting the ball (which moves him the corresponding number of bases) or by stealing.

=== Base stealing ===
This means they are now playing flip cup against a person from the other team, a catcher. If the person on base wishes to advance (steal) they begin to play single cup flip cup. If the person on base wins they advance, if they lose they are thrown out, and are off the bases and an out is recorded. The person attempting to steal must not try to steal until the opposing team has set and refilled their cups, an attempt to steal before this is done is considered void and must be sent back to the original base. If the catcher lifts up their cup before the base runner lifts up their cup this is a balk and the base runner advances one base.

=== Defending ===
If a player throws a ball that hits a cup and the opposing team catches it, it is an out. Should a player throw an airball (the ball touches no cups), it is considered an out. The person catching must rotate by inning and no one can catch a second time until everyone has caught once. All catches must be made using the players off-hand (the hand that glove would be worn on during a real game of baseball). All catches must be made cleanly without trapping the ball against the body or letting the ball hit the floor.

=== Man Lodge Rules ===
An alternate set of rules (known as "Man Lodge Rules") exists to make the game higher scoring, feel more similar to actual baseball, and make home runs more rewarding. In Man Lodge rules the gameplay is similar except:

1. Missing all cups but still hitting the table is counted as a strike, as opposed to an out
2. Bouncing the ball off a cup is treated as a foul ball, and if caught in the air is an out, if not it is counted as a strike (similar to actual baseball)
3. Missing the table entirely ALWAYS constitutes an out, whether or not the defense catches it
4. Each cup is filled halfway, once a cup is made you pull that cup and drink its contents, with the exception of a home run, in the event of a home run all remaining cups are consumed, and all cups are replaced.
5. If a player makes a "base" cup a player is currently drinking (similar to a "death cup" in beer pong) that is considered a "Grand Slam" - drink remaining cups and count 4 runs scored
6. All players on the defending team are active. A single defender is in the middle and, in the case of a foul ball, must hit the ball up after the ball bounces off a cup for a teammate to catch for it to be an out. If a defender catches the ball before it is hit up by the middle player, or they fail to catch it, then it is simply a foul ball.

=== Hoover Rules ===
An alternate set of rules (known as "Hoover Rules") exists to make the game more challenging for more experienced players.

1. Any member of the team can catch the ball for an out with either or both hands.
2. The 'Home-run' cup is placed on an island at the back of the table away from the other three cups.
3. There is only one 'steal' cup which acts as a steal for the leading base runner. If the base-runner is stealing home, then the player stealing must flip the cup successfully twice, while the defender must only flip the cup once to throw the runner out. Additionally, any member from the opposing team may 'throw' the stealing player out. In this rule variation, there is no designated 'catcher'.
