= Mao (card game) =

Card game

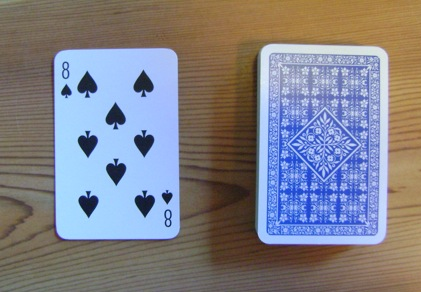
- Alternative names: Mau
- Type: Shedding-type
- Players: 3+ (best with 5–8)
- Skills: Invention, induction, memory
- Cards: 52
- Deck: Standard 52-card deck
- Rank (high→low): N/A
- Play: Clockwise; Counter-clockwise
- Playing time: 5 minutes upwards per round
- Chance: Variable

Related games
- Switch

Mao (or Mau) is a card game of the shedding family. The aim is to get rid of all of the cards in hand without breaking certain unspoken rules which tend to vary by venue. The game is from a subset of the Stops family and is similar in structure to the card game Uno or Crazy Eights.

The game forbids its players from explaining the rules, and new players are often informed that "the only rule you may be told is this one". The ultimate goal of the game is to be the first player to get rid of all the cards in their hand. Specifics are discovered through trial and error. A player who breaks a rule is penalized by being given an additional card from the deck. The person giving the penalty must state what the incorrect action was, without explaining the rule that was broken.

There are many variants of Mao in existence. While beginners sometimes assume that the dealer (sometimes called the "Chairman", the "Mao" or the "Grand Master") and other experienced players are simply making up possibly inconsistent rules (as in the games Mornington Crescent or Fizbin), the rules of Mao are consistent within each game and can be followed correctly.

== History ==
Mao is most likely descended from the German game Mau Mau. It may have influenced the game Eleusis, which was published in Martin Gardner's column in Scientific American in June 1959. Both of these games share similar principles of inductive reasoning.

Other inductive games in which not all players know the rules include Penultima and Zendo; however, the secret rules in those games are made up at the start of play and disclosed at the end of each round, and the scope and subject matter of Eleusis, Penultima or Zendo rules may be more explicit and closely circumscribed.

Mao's name and rules are a reference to Chairman Mao Zedong's rule over China. The rules not being explained are an allusion to the laws in China at the time being in constant flux, leading to many people being arrested for laws they did not know existed.

== Rules ==
Part of the traditional experience of Mao is a new player being forced to learn some or all of the rules of the game through observation and trial and error. Thus new players are not presented with a list of rules, as part of the game is to discover the rules through gameplay.

The exact set of rules divulged to new players varies between groups of players: some groups will say "the only rule I can tell you is this one", others will reveal the goal of eliminating cards, and some might outline the basic rules and, in most cases, no rules are revealed at all. However much information is revealed, the players will explain that they are not allowed to reveal any more, and that the new player must deduce the full rules during play.

Mao rules can vary widely between different groups with no individual set of rules being canonical.

=== Rules of play ===
Each player is dealt an initial hand of the same number of cards; the exact number of cards dealt varies, but is generally either three or seven. The size of the deck also varies; it is good to have approximately one 52-card deck for every two or three players, but extra cards are not important to gameplay. Two or more combined decks is common; matching card backs is not important. Once the cards are dealt, the remaining cards are placed face down in a stack in the middle of the table, and the top card from the stack is turned over and placed next to it. The dealer may then say "this game of Mao has officially begun", "the game of Mao begins now", "Mao is a game of rules" or a variant thereof. Play commences with the player to the left of the dealer and proceeds clockwise. Many variants penalize players for touching or looking at their cards before the game begins, or before the dealer looks at their own cards.

A player may play any card from their hand matching the value or the suit of the top card currently face-up on the table. The card played must be placed on top of this card, and the next player will have to play a card that matches the new one. If the player has no cards they can play, they must instead draw a new card from the top of the stack and, in some variants, say something such as "pass", "penalty card" or knock on the table to indicate inability to play a card.

Rules vary widely between variants. Some common rules include:

- A face value reverses the order of play (commonly eight, sometimes two).
- Aces cause the next player to skip their turn.
- Jacks are wild, allowing any player to call out a new suit when a jack is played.
- Spade cards must be named when played (e.g., playing an ace of spades requires the player to say "ace of spades").
- A seven forces the next player to draw a penalty card and requires the person who played it to announce "have a nice day". If the next player also plays a seven, they announce "have a very nice day" and the player after that draws two penalty cards. The number of "very"s and penalty cards can increase as long as sevens can be played.

=== Variant rules ===
As might be expected in a game where the rules are unknown to many of the players, a wide variety of rulesets have developed.

The rules are typically changed between games, either at the beginning or with each successive game. Many times, this is simply that the winner of the last game is allowed to construct their own rule. This new rule is made known to the dealer or not, depending on the game, though in many varieties it is required for the dealer to know the rule in order to confirm its use and to enforce it. Often the winner of the last game is also made the new dealer.

In another variant, players abandon all normal rules and have each player make up a rule of their own at the very beginning of the game. This variant is known as "Dutch Mao", or "The People's Democratic Dictatorship", and probably several other names. It has no restrictions on what cards to play (other than those made by the players) and can get very confusing when rules conflict.

=== Speaking ===
Many of the rules of Mao involve speech. Mostly this means that the right thing must be said at the right time. Saying the wrong thing, or speaking at the wrong time, will usually incur a penalty.

No talking
In most variants of Mao, no unnecessary speech is allowed, and one may only speak when required to do so by the rules. For example, if one plays a 6 of spades (with the declaring spades rule active), one is required to say "six of spades" and will be penalized for not doing so. But if one says, "six of spades, I didn't forget this time" one will be penalized for the additional unnecessary speech. A different but common way to say this is "excessive verbosity".
Point of order
Any player (or, in some variations, only the dealer) may at any time announce "point of order", which is a signal for all players to put down their cards while discussion takes place.
Thank you
It may be required to thank the dealer for each penalty card. Usually a player is given a reasonable amount of time to say "thank you" before being penalized. Failure to say "thank you" after a penalty card will usually result in another penalty card. One "thank you" will usually cover for all occurrences where it was required.
Last card
Some variants require the player to announce when they have only one card left in their hand. This can be with the statement of "last card", "zin", "one card left" or "Mao" itself (similar to Uno). If a player fails to announce their last card, they receive a penalty card. In some versions, they continue to receive penalty cards until they announce their last card. At this point, because it is not their last card anymore, they are given three additional penalty cards in quick succession for "lying, cheating, theft".
End game
Upon playing their last card, a player must call out "Mao", "game over" or some other similar phrase to win. Should a player forget to say "Mao", or call it incorrectly, they are penalized. Stacking penalties at this point can cause much grief to a player who has gleefully placed their last card down and proclaimed "Mao", only to discover that they have broken some rule.
Swearing
Many variants prohibit swearing, whereas other variants consider swearing to be an exception to the prohibition on excessive verbosity.
Playing a king
In some variants, playing a king requires the player to say "hail to the chairman" (alluding to Chairman Mao) or "all hail the chief", and playing a queen requires the player to say "hail to the chairwoman", "hail the chairman's wife", "all hail the chair lady", or "all hail her Mighty Majesty the Queen of Spades". Then the other players are sometimes required to say "all hail". In other variants, playing a king requires the player to say "The king has entered the building." When the next player plays a card, they must say "The king has left the building."
"Have a nice day"
Some versions of the game will require a player to tell the next player "have a nice day" upon playing a seven. For instance, if the next person was John, the player would say "have a nice day John". Not doing so would result in a penalty card.
Special card names
In some variants, specific cards are given a name that is to be said instead of the real name of the card. For example, upon playing the nine of diamonds or a joker, a player might say "that's the badger!" Failure to say this would result in a penalty card.

=== Points of order ===
Any player (or, in some variations, only the dealer) may at any time announce "point of order" (could also be "court of law", "point of information", "point of interest", "pevis", or "coffee break"), which is a signal for all players to put down their cards, while discussion takes place. A common abbreviation is "P of O". This time period basically is an intermission to game play and often comes with its own set of rules. Some versions penalize for abbreviating "point of order" to "P of O", which often confuses new players into thinking only the dealer or chairman is permitted to call a point of order. Most versions penalize players for touching their cards (including failing to put them down in a timely manner) during a point of order.

The objective of a point of order is to clarify uncertain aspects of gameplay: particularly to allow disputes over penalties to be resolved. A point of order may also be used to accommodate out-of-game necessities such as eating, shuffling the discard pile to form a new draw pile, etc. Some variants may impose restrictions or penalties on a player's activities during a point of order:

- Players have to talk in the third person.
- Players are not allowed to say the phrase "point of order" during a point of order (this can usually be circumvented by saying abbreviations such as: "point of O", "P of order", "P of O", "point order", "POO", "P-Vo", "Piffo", etc. and often has to be to actually call a penalty that would otherwise have the phrase "point of order" in it).

The point of order ends when any player (or, depending on local rules, only the dealer, or only the player that called point of order) announces "end point of order", "point taken", "point of disorder", or "pick your cards up", at which point the cards are picked back up and play resumes.

=== Penalties ===
The normal penalty for any offence in Mao is one card per offence, though as previously stated, offences are consecutively applied, making some offences harsher than others.

There is usually a time limit of approximately 5 to 10 seconds for each turn. If exceeded, the player gets a penalty card for delay of game or late play and either loses their turn or gets another penalty every five seconds thereafter to either comply with any violated rules, or play a card. Ruthless players who are familiar with the rules sometimes exploit this rule to confuse new players who are unfamiliar with game mechanics that change the order of play: for example, players might look expectantly at a particular player other than the one whose turn it is as if waiting for them to play, then penalizing that player for playing out of turn if they actually played, then immediately penalizing the player whose turn it actually is for delay of game.

For each penalty, unless the rules have been changed appropriately, the penalty card is given with the declaration of the rule violated.

In most cases, when a penalty is called, one card is given to the offender. If the call was incorrect, the caller of a penalty can be given the card back with a reason of "bad call" or "frivolous card-giving".

=== Adding rules ===
In many variants an additional rule is silently and secretly added to the game with each round. It is customary for a player (often the winner of the previous round, sometimes the next person to deal) to add one new rule to the game. In a game with only one round, players who have gotten rid of all their cards may make a rule for those still in the game. Sometimes a new rule is explained to one other player (sometimes the dealer, sometimes a runner-up winner of the round), both to ensure consistency of the rule and consistency of its enforcement. Any new rules are allowed, but it must not be biased towards a player.

There may also be additional rules that are already in effect at the beginning of the game, just to get things moving, and these rules may be known to all players, or perhaps only to the dealer. After many rounds, many new rules will accumulate. Naturally, only the person who created the rule will initially know what it is. The rules will vary from group to group, and from game to game, but most rules fall under one of the following four categories.

- When an event occurs, a player must perform an action (such as speaking a phrase or knocking on the table)
- When an event occurs, something about the game changes
- An action must always, or must never, be performed by players (such as holding cards in the left hand, or straightening the pile)
- Something fundamental about the gameplay changes (e.g. all kings are treated as if they were jacks for all game purposes)

The triggering events in the example above can be anything. They might include playing a specific card (the ace of spades) or a specific type of card (any red three), but triggering conditions can become as complicated as their creator wishes, such as when someone plays the fourth card of the same suit or playing an odd-numbered card on top of an even-numbered card.

To create a rule, one could pick a triggering condition, and then an action and/or game effect. The spirit of the rule is generally something in good fun; while rules that unfairly sway the game in favor of one player or to the detriment of one specific player are quite easy to concoct ("Every time James plays a ten, he gets a penalty of ten cards"), they are also generally frowned upon as unsportsmanlike. Rarely do rules have a penalty of more than one card, but certain rules have a large penalty attached to them, usually the result of a cumulative rule.

== See also ==
- Bartok, in which new rules are announced to all players when they are added
- Nomic, a game in which all rules are subject to change
- Calvinball, a fictitious game in which the rules change each time
- List of games with concealed rules
