= Ship, captain, and crew =

Dice drinking game

Ship, Captain and Crew
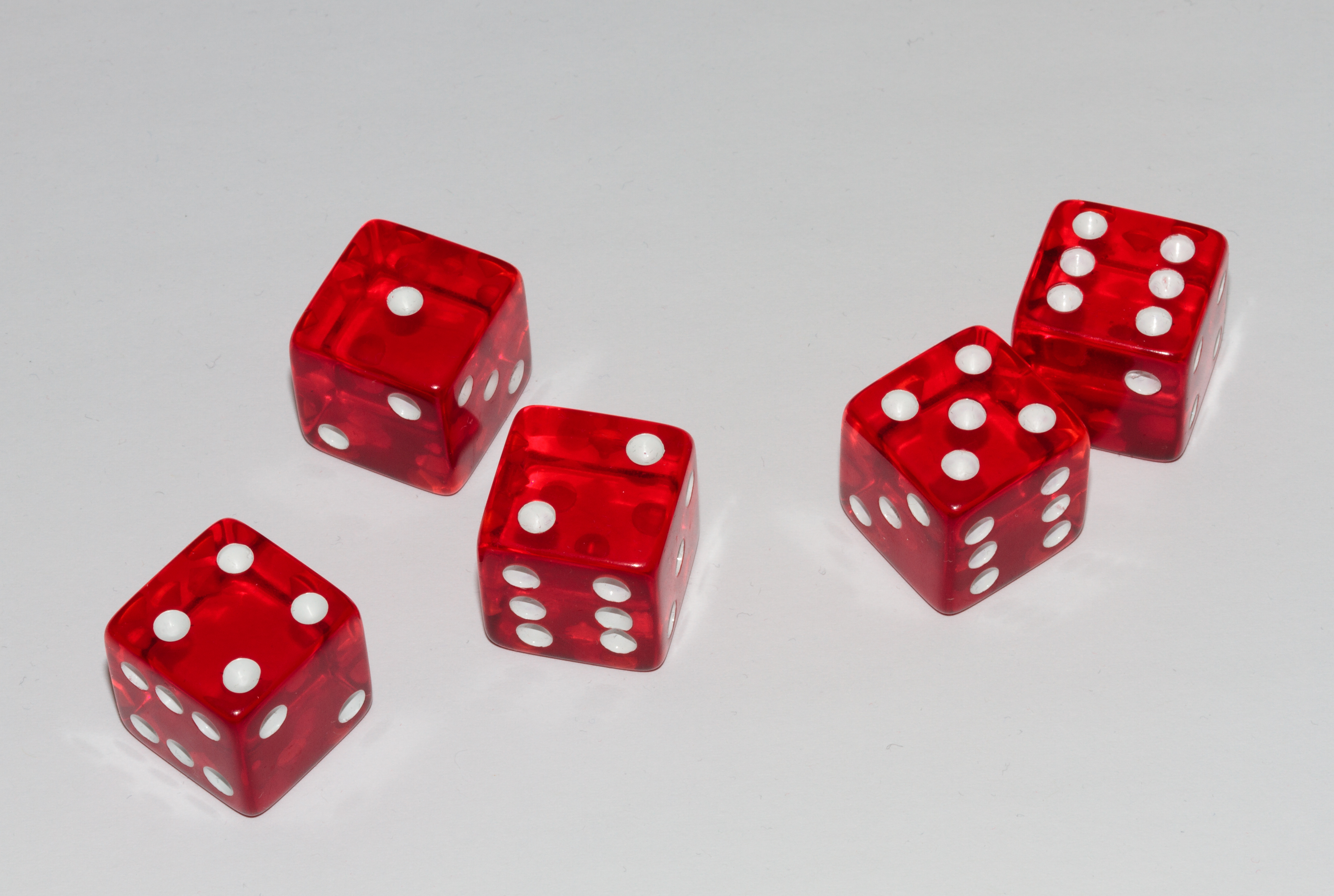
- A completed turn, showing a ship (six), captain (five) and crew (four), with a cargo worth three points (two+one)
- Genres: Drinking
- Players: 2+
- Playing time: <15 min./round

Ship, Captain, and Crew (also referred to as Cap'n, Bos'n, Mate; Ship of Fools; Clickety Clack; 6-5-4 or Destroyer) is a drinking game played with five dice. The game can be played with as few as two people but is usually played in a group of five or more. The object of the game is to roll a six (the "ship"), a five ("captain"), and a four ("crew") with three dice, and get the highest score with the other two dice ("the ship's cargo"). In other versions, a four is the "mate" and the remaining dice are the crew.

Alternatively, the game may be played for antes placed in a pot. Any amount can be predetermined for ante to the pot for each round with winner taking all or the pot going forward in the case of a tie.

== Rules ==
Each player starts their turn by rolling five dice. They are attempting to roll a six, five and four in descending order, and whenever the number they require is rolled, they "bank" it by setting it aside.

For example, if the first roll of the dice shows six, four, three, three, and one, the player banks the six but must reroll the four because there is no five yet. If their second roll is a six, five, four, and one, they may bank the five and four together, and now they have a full "crew" for their ship.

Each player has only three rolls, and after their third they score their turn. If they have a crewed ship then they score the "cargo" - the total of the other two dice. If they do not have a crewed ship, they score nothing.

The winner is the player at the end of a round who has the highest score. If the winner of the round scores with a ship, captain, crew on the first roll, that sets the pace for the other players: ship, captain, crew + 6 in one shake is what to beat. One shake to best the previous player.

When beginning the next round, play begins with the player to the right (counterclockwise) of the first player in the previous round. Alternatively, the player who won the last round starts the next round.

== Traditions ==
The last person to throw the dice in a round is "the hammer." The current winning score is "the point." It is common to hear a player who is not keeping up ask, "What's the point and who's the hammer?"

A two is the lowest score and is called a "minimum." Double sixes, or scoring a twelve, is often referred to as a "midnight", most likely because 12 o'clock at night on a non-military clock is known as midnight. Sixes have also been known to be called boxcars.

It is possible to play this game for money, either by anteing or by playing for a set value per point.

When played as a drinking game, at the end of the round everyone except for the winner must drink. Alternatively, the winner may roll dice to determine how many drinks the losers must consume.
