= Boat race (game) =

Drinking game

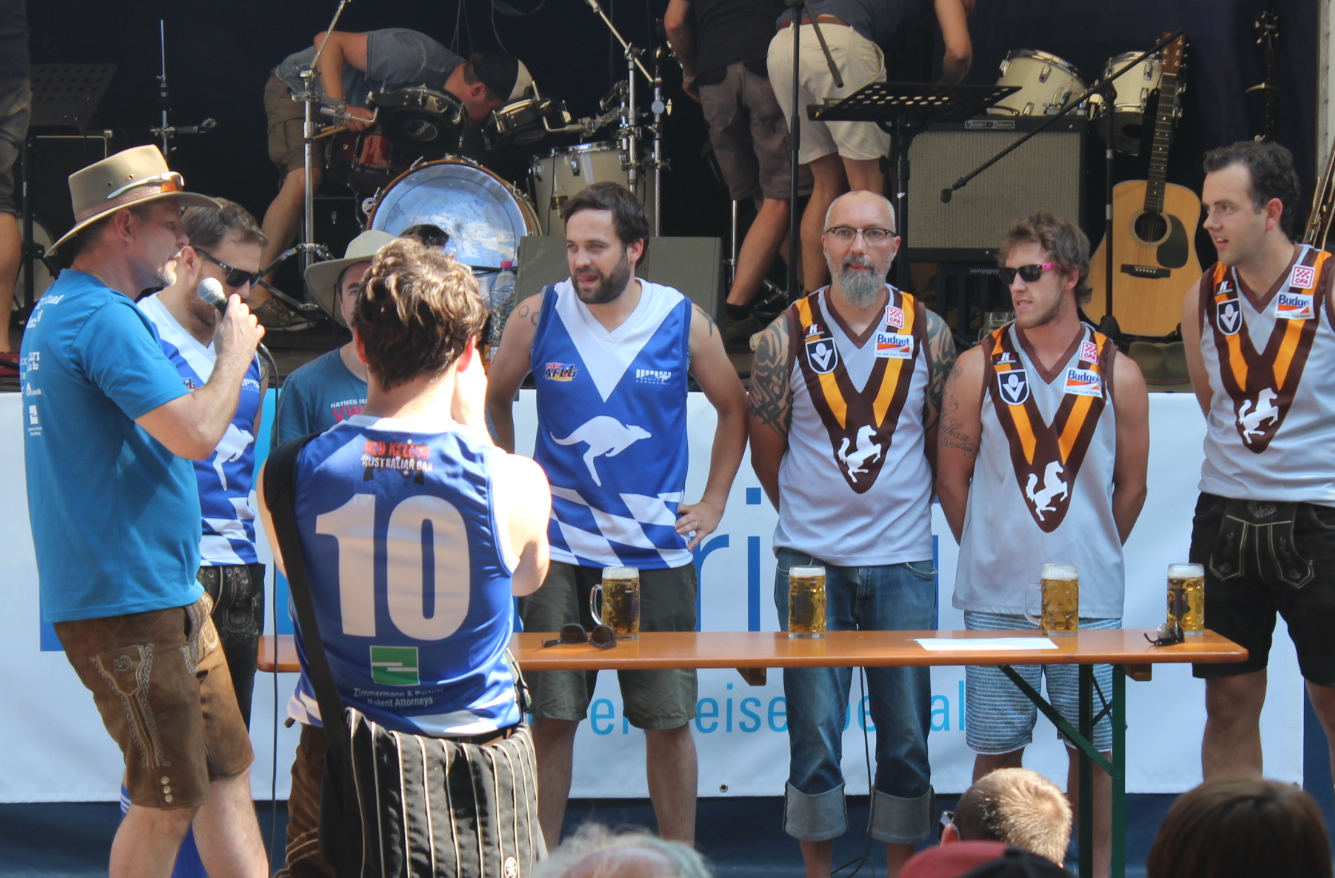
A boat race between the Australian rules football teams the Munich Kangaroos and the Pasing Hawks, at the OzFest 2015 Munich, Germany

A boat race is a drinking game where teams, usually of equal numbers, race to finish their drinks in sequence.

One theory on the name is that it is acronym for "beer on a table", an alternative explanation may come from the Australian term for drinking a full beer in one continuous motion i.e. "to skull" or "skulling" and that term's homonym in the single crewed rowing race "sculling" & hence a boat race.

The Concise Macquarie Dictionary has this entry for boatrace

Colloq: A competition between teams of beer drinkers to see which team can drink its beer the fastest; a drinking competition.

Common rules include those regulating the number and gender of drinkers, the vessels from which the liquid must be consumed and punishments for spilling. The game appeared in the 2006 Broken Lizard movie, Beerfest.

A race begins with all competitors placing their drinks on a mutual table. When a referee begins the race, the first drinker on each team is allowed to pick up their drink and begin drinking. Once a beverage is consumed, the drinker must invert the empty vessel on their head. This is done to ensure no cheating occurs. The next team mate cannot touch their own drink until this has occurred. Empty vessels must be kept on the competitors' heads until the race is over.

The game is a long-established tradition amongst many Australian amateur Rugby Union leagues. Players receiving points for their on field performance then become the participants for the boat race after, but may sub out for injury. The game is played in Germany as a team version of Bierjunge (lit. 'beer boy').

== See also ==
- Beer floating
