= Ali Spagnola =

American comedian & singer-songwriter

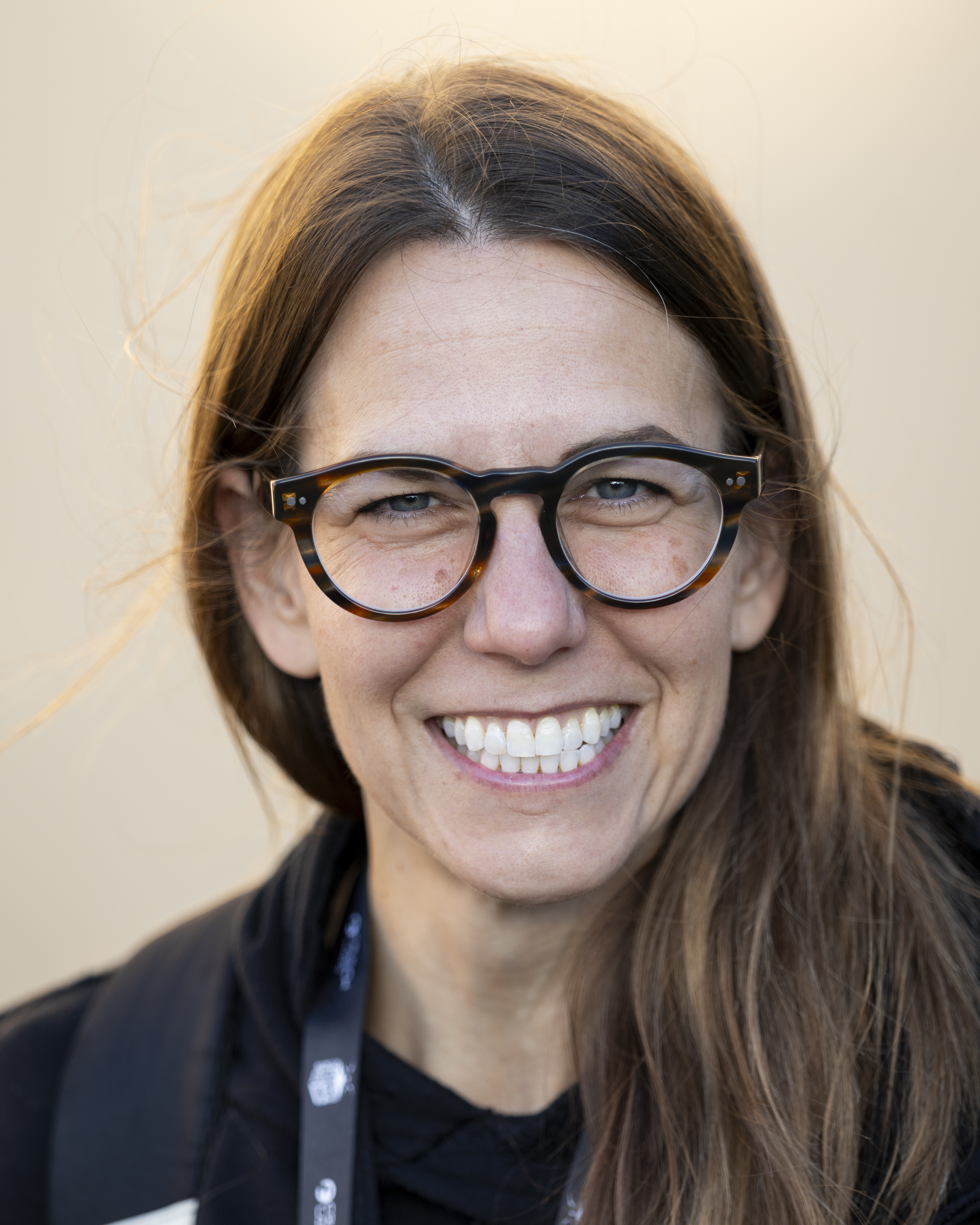
- Spagnola in 2026
- Born: December 18, 1984 (age 41); Pittsburgh, Pennsylvania, United States
- Occupations: Musician and YouTuber
- Notable work: Ali Spagnola's Power Hour Drinking Game
- Website: alispagnola.com

Alicia Dawn Spagnola, also known as Ali Spagnola (born December 18, 1984), is an American musician and YouTuber. She created a Power Hour Drinking Game Album that contains 60 one-minute songs. She also created several of the ringtones shipped on multiple Android phones. Her YouTube channel has over 2,000,000 subscribers, and mainly features videos of her creating some form of art, whether it be mixed-media, music, visual, or film. Spagnola also makes videos on the social media platform TikTok.

== Early life ==
Spagnola was born in a town outside of Pittsburgh, Pennsylvania. She began studying dance, jazz, ballet, and piano at a young age. She was a percussionist in her school band, subsequently picking up the guitar and taking voice lessons. Spagnola went to Carnegie Mellon University to study art. After school, she became an animator and then lead artist at a video game company in Pittsburgh, notably creating graphics and animations for the score board on the Toy Story Mania! game at Walt Disney World. During that same time, Spagnola also held a job as sound designer for Android, composing UI sounds, alarms and ringtones. Her songs such as "Radiation" and "Robots for Everyone" were shipped as default ringtones for Android devices such as the Nexus One, Motorola Droid, Nexus S, Galaxy Nexus and Nexus 4.

== Career ==
=== Free Paintings ===
In 2008, Spagnola started a project called Free Paintings. She takes requests online via email about what she should paint. She fills requests whenever she can creating a 12x12", bright, pop art, acrylic painting. She then mails the painting to the requester for free. Requests are filled on a first come first served basis. The wait list is reported to be over 1,300 people long. She has completed 2,517 paintings for the project and still continues to create one square foot of art a day.

=== Music ===
Spagnola has released four self-published albums. Some of these songs have been featured on MTV's The Real World and Oxygen's Bad Girls Club. In December 2012, Huffington Post included her performance of "HuffPost Weird News" on their "End Of The World Playlist".

==== The Power Hour Drinking Game ====
In college, Spagnola began playing "drinking game concerts" by taking the idea of a "power hour" - drinking 60 shots of beer in an hour - and mixing it with a live show. She wrote 60 one-minute drinking songs and performed them live while people drank along with every song. Spagnola later recorded the songs to create The Power Hour Album. She also designed, developed and manufactured her new Shot Glass USB, a shot glass with a removable USB drive that holds The Power Hour Album.

In 2010, Steve Roose, who markets a DVD game named "Power Hour", registered a trademark of the same name and soon after began sending cease-and-desist orders to Ali Spagnola. Spagnola announced her intentions to fight the claims, and an intellectual-property professor from the University of Pittsburgh has stated that "if 'Power Hour' is a generic description of 'a drinking game that involves drinking a shot of alcohol each minute for an hour,' then Mr. Roose can't have any trademark rights at all."

In December 2012, the Roose trademark was invalidated.

== Discography ==
- Ali Spagnola (2007)
- Free of Style (2007)
- The Ego (2010)
- The Power Hour Album (2011)
