= The Game (mind game) =

Mental thought-suppression game

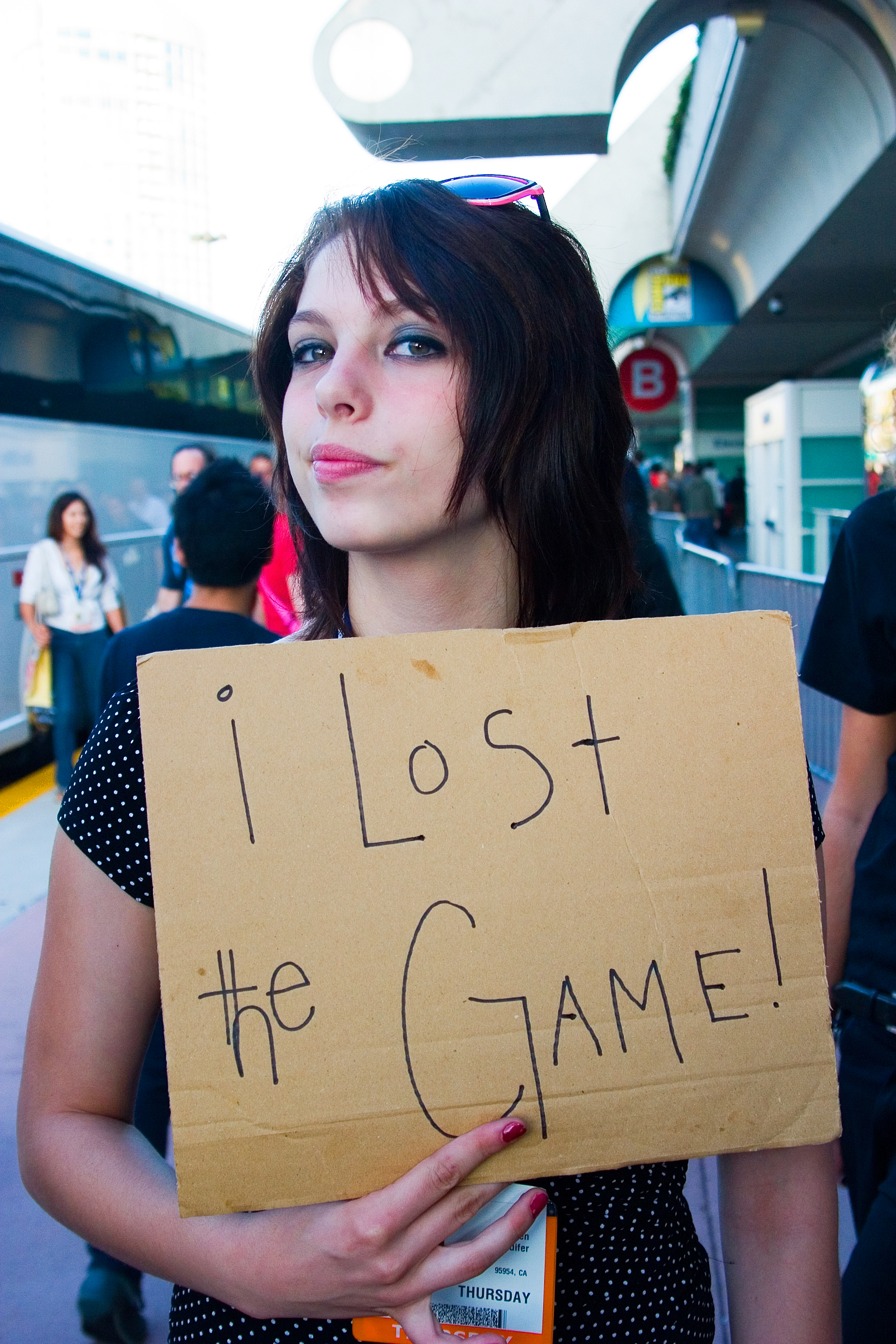
A player announces her loss of The Game at San Diego Comic-Con in July 2008.

The Game is a mind game in which the objective is to avoid thinking about The Game itself. Thinking about The Game constitutes a loss, which must be announced each time it occurs. It is impossible to win most versions of The Game. Depending on the variation, it is held all over the world, or all those who are aware of the game, are playing it at all times. Tactics have been developed to increase the number of people who are aware of The Game, and thereby increase the number of losses.

== Origin ==
The origins of The Game are uncertain. The most common hypothesis is that The Game derives from another mental game, Finchley Central. While the original version of Finchley Central involves taking turns to name stations, in 1976, members of the Cambridge University Science Fiction Society (CUSFS) developed a variant wherein the first person to think of the titular station loses. The game in this form demonstrates ironic processing, in which attempts to suppress or avoid certain thoughts make those thoughts more common or persistent than they would be at random.

How this became simplified into The Game is unknown; one hypothesis is that once it spread outside the Greater London area, among people who are less familiar with London stations, it morphed into its self-referential form. The creators of "LoseTheGame.net", a website which aims to catalogue information relating to the phenomenon, have received messages from multiple former members of the CUSFS commenting on the similarity between the Finchley Central variant and the modern Game. The first known reference to The Game is a blog post from 2002 – the author states that they "found out about it online about 6 months ago".

The Game is most commonly spread through the internet, such as via Facebook or Twitter, or by word of mouth.

== Gameplay ==
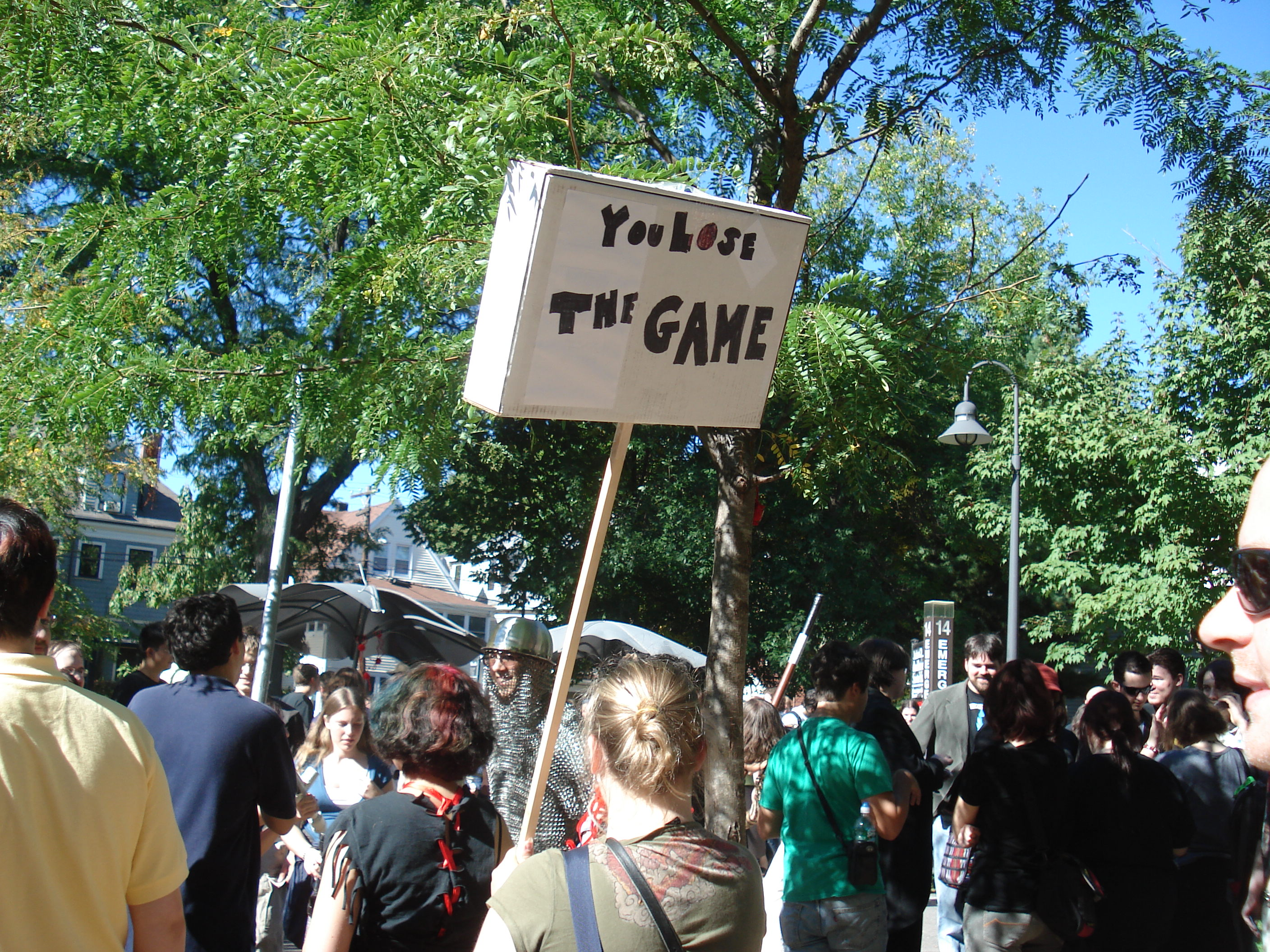
A woman holding up a sign reading "You Lose The Game"

There are three commonly reported rules to The Game:

1. Everyone in the world is playing The Game. (This is alternatively expressed as, "Everybody in the world who knows about The Game is playing The Game" or "You are always playing The Game.") A person cannot refuse to play The Game; it does not require consent to play and one can never stop playing.
2. Whenever one thinks about The Game, one loses.
3. Losses must be announced. This can be verbally, with a phrase such as "I just lost The Game", or in any other way: for example, via Facebook or other social media.

The definition of "thinking about The Game" is not always clear. If one discusses The Game without realizing that they have lost, this may or may not constitute a loss. If someone says "What is The Game?" before understanding the rules, whether they have lost is up for interpretation. According to some interpretations, one does not lose when someone else announces their loss, although the second rule implies that one loses regardless of what made them think about The Game. After a player has announced a loss, or after one thinks of The Game, some variants allow for a grace period between three seconds to thirty minutes to forget about the game, during which the player cannot lose the game again.

=== Strategies ===
Strategies focus on making others lose The Game. Common methods include saying "The Game" out loud often "You just lost the game" or writing about The Game on a hidden note, in graffiti in public places, or on banknotes.

Associations may be made with The Game, especially over time, so that one thing inadvertently causes one to lose. Some players enjoy thinking of elaborate pranks that will cause others to lose the game.

Other strategies involve merchandise: T-shirts, buttons, mugs, posters, and bumper stickers have been created to advertise The Game. The Game is also spread via social media websites such as Facebook and Twitter.

=== Possible endings ===
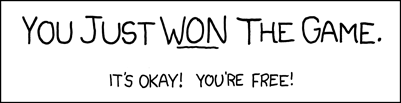
xkcd 391

The common rules do not define a point at which The Game ends. However, some players state that The Game ends when the prime minister of the United Kingdom announces on television that "The Game is up." The March 3, 2008 edition of the webcomic xkcd declares its reader the winner of the game, and therefore free from the game's "mindvirus".

== Reception ==
The Game has been described as challenging and fun to play, as well as pointless, childish, and infuriating. In some Internet forums, such as Something Awful and GameSpy, and in several schools, The Game has been banned.

The 2009 Time 100 poll was manipulated by users of 4chan, forming an acrostic for "marblecake also the game" out of the top 21 people's names.

== See also ==
- The Button (Reddit) – Experimental meta-game on Reddit
- Catch-22 (logic) – Situation in which one cannot avoid a problem because of contradictory constraints
- Finchley Central (game) – Improvisational comedy game
- Finite and Infinite Games – 1986 book by James P. Carse
- In-joke – Humour only specific people understand
- Information hazard – Risk caused by disseminating information
- Meme – Cultural idea that spreads through imitation
- Mornington Crescent (game) – Improvisational comedy game
- Paradox – Logically self-contradictory statement
