= Manifold (magazine) =

- Discipline: Mathematics
- Language: English

Publication details
- History: 1968-1980
- Publisher: University of Warwick

Standard abbreviations
- ISO 4: Manifold

Manifold was a mathematical magazine published at the University of Warwick. It was established in 1968. Its philosophy was "It is possible to be serious about mathematics, without being solemn." Its best known editor was the mathematician Ian Stewart who edited the magazine in the late 1960s.

A 1969 edition of the magazine mentioned a game called "Finchley Central", which became the basis for the game of Mornington Crescent as popularised by the BBC Radio 4 panel game I'm Sorry I Haven't a Clue.

In 1983 the magazine was reincarnated as 2-Manifold.
