= 21 (drinking game) =

Drinking game

21, Bagram, or Twenty Plus One is a drinking game. The game progresses by counting up from 1 to 21, with the player who calls "21" suffering a drinking penalty before the next round starts. The loser may add 1 new rule to the game, and starts the new round. The game was invented at the Swan and 3 cygnets in Durham City in 1997 by Alan Smith, Ian Crosby, Stuart Lockey, Kieran Walker, Paul Nicholson, Brian Griffen, Gavin Southwell, Mark Thompson, Stephen Rickaby and Andrew Barras

== Rules ==
Players are arranged in a circle, facing inwards. The game begins with one player calling the direction of play by saying, "I propose a game of XXXX! To my left..." or "To my right..." followed by a sequential series of numbers beginning with one. Variations exist for the proposal of the game depending on personal rules; this is due to some variants calling for any person who says the number "21" to drink. For example:

- "I propose a game of 21!"
- "I propose a game of 20...22!"
- "I propose a game of twenty plus one!"
- "I propose a game of the unspeakable number!"

As the game progresses, each player in turn must recite one to four numbers, counting in sequence from where the previous player left off:

- Saying one number (e.g. "one") passes the game to the next player in the circle in the initial direction.
- Saying two numbers (e.g. "one, two") passes to the next player, but reverses direction.
- Saying three numbers (e.g. "one, two, three") passes in the initial direction, but skips a player.
- Saying four numbers (e.g. "one, two, three, four") reverses direction and skips a player.

If a player makes a mistake, then they suffer a small to moderate drinking penalty (e.g. 2 fingers of drink) and then restart the game from 1. Mistakes include:

- Hesitating to continue the game.
- Calling the wrong number.
- Calling a number out of turn.
- Breaching any original or instated rule.

Assuming there are no mistakes, the game will continue in sequence up to 21. The player who calls 21 suffers a heavy drinking penalty (e.g. finishing their drink), creates a new rule, then restarts the game from 1.

== Additional rules ==
Variations on the standard rules include:

- Prohibiting three players calling single numbers in a row.
- "Doubling a double" – prohibits saying two numbers after two numbers.
- "Tripling a triple" – prohibits either saying three numbers after three numbers, or after 2 sets of three numbers.
- "Reversing into a hole" – prohibits saying two numbers after three numbers.
- Prohibiting calling out a series of numbers that sum to 21 (e.g. "6, 7, 8" or "10, 11")

Examples of new rules that could be instated by a player forced to call 21:

- Swapping two numbers around (e.g. 3 and 13 are switched)
- Replacing a number with a humorous phrase (e.g. replacing 5 with "skin" – causing the sequence 1, 2, 3, "foreskin")
- Instating an underlying set of rules (e.g. left hand drinking)
- Thumb master – the last player to place their thumb on the table following the thumb master must drink.
- Head master – as with thumb master, but replacing the thumb with the head
- Pose master – the last player to strike a pose following the pose master must drink.

It is also commonplace to declare (either at the start of the game or as an additional rule) that the game be played according to the so-called "International Drinking Rules". These are a body of generally accepted but not entirely uniform rules that players understand to apply to all drinking activity and include rules for example, that drinkers must keep their little finger up whilst drinking, only drink with their left hand and, in some circles, that using the word "drink" be prohibited and replaced with words such as "consume" or "imbibe".

== Example ==
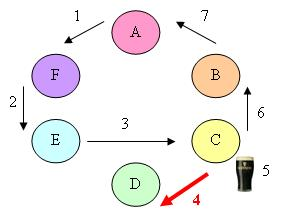
The events of the example game.

Andy, Bill, Cath, Dan, Ed and Fran are sitting with Andy at 12 o'clock, and the other players arranged clockwise in alphabetical order:

1. Andy: I propose a game of 21! To my left: 1, 2. {play called to the left, but reversed immediately → Fran}
2. Fran: 3. {→ Ed}
3. Ed: 4, 5, 6 {skips Dan → Cath}
4. Cath: 7, 8 {Cath violates the additional rule "reversing into a hole"! She is penalised 2 fingers of drink.
5. Cath drinks
6. Cath: I propose a game of 21! To my right: 1. {→ Bill}
7. Bill: 2. {→ Andy}

The game ultimately finishes when all the numbers have been replaced, by rule changes instigated by the person who drinks on 21.

== Variations ==
- Using Roman numerals. Replacing the Roman numerals with other humorous or explicit phrases can make the game more interesting (e.g. replace I with "No", V with "Daddy" and X with "Don't touch me!")
- The Ed Balls version of Roman numerals. In this game you replace I with "Ed", V with "Balls" and X with "Ed Balls"
- Using the binary number system.
- Replacing numbers with themed sets of phrases.

Rules for these variants are widely varied.

== See also ==
- List of drinking games
