= Pub golf =

Drinking game

- Genres: drinking game
- Players: 2+
- Setup time: 1-2 hours (course planning)
- Playing time: 2+ hours (depending on group size and focus)
- Age range: 18+/21+
- Skills: endurance, alcohol tolerance

Pub golf or bar golf is a pub crawl and drinking game involving a selection of either nine or eighteen pubs or bars, creating a "course" to be played by two or more people. Each pub or bar is regarded as a hole on a golf course, with a pre-agreed number of swallows per assigned drink for that "hole", making up a par number.

== Rules ==
Like the game of golf, pub golf has the standard 9 or 18 different "holes", wherein each bar is considered a "hole". The bars to be visited during the game are predetermined and numbered. Prior to playing the game, a par number, representing how many sips it should take to complete the drink assigned. The drinks assigned to the different "holes" (pubs) tend to vary, with a reasonable par number for the assigned drink. A simple shot, for example, would be given a par one.

If the number of sips is the same as the par number, then that participant receives a par score for that hole, whereas the score will be higher or lower if the number of sips is higher or lower than par, respectively. The goal, like in golf, is to end the game with the lowest score.

There are many different variations of pub golf played, and some games add hazards to the course. For example, holes can be assigned as having a water hazard, which would mean that the toilet cannot be used while playing that hole, or else a penalty stroke is given.

Often the individual who comes last in pub golf is expected to do a forfeit. One of the most popular forfeits is the person that finishes in last place has to go in their pub golf costume to a public place, such as universities or a place of work.

== See also ==
- List of public house topics
