= Power hour =

Drinking game

Drinking Game
- Other names: 21 for 21
- Players: Any number
- Setup time: Varies
- Playing time: 60 minutes
- Chance: None

Power hour or 21 for 21 is a drinking game where players must consume a specified number of alcohol shots within one hour. Variants include drinking one shot of beer every minute for an hour, or 60 shots of beer within one hour. In the United States, a power hour event is often associated with a person's 21st birthday when they reach the legal drinking age. A Century Club or Centurion is an alternative to a power hour which involves consuming 100 shots of beer in 100 minutes.

== Consequences ==
Players often have difficulty completing the specified number of drinks as the rate of consumption raises their blood alcohol content to high levels. The rate of alcohol consumption makes the players highly intoxicated within a short period of time, potentially resulting in alcohol poisoning with the risk of coma or death.

== Trademark controversy ==
In 2010, Power Hour LLC, run by Steve Roose who markets a DVD game named "Power Hour", registered a trademark of the same name. Soon after, the company began sending cease-and-desist orders to Ali Spagnola, a musician who had released an album also titled Power Hour. Spagnola announced her intentions to fight the claims, and an intellectual-property professor from the University of Pittsburgh stated that "if 'Power Hour' is a generic description of 'a drinking game that involves drinking a shot of alcohol each minute for an hour,' then Power Hour LLC can't have any trademark rights at all." In December 2012, courts ruled in Spagnola's favor.
