= Nomic =

1982 game by Peter Suber

Nomic is a game created in 1982 by philosopher Peter Suber in which players submit and democratically vote on changes to the rules over time. Suber used the game to suggest that in any system where rule-changes are possible, a situation may arise in which the resulting laws are contradictory or insufficient to determine what is legal.

== Etymology ==
The name Nomic derives from the Greek for "law", νόμος (nomos), because it models (and exposes conceptual questions about) legal systems and the problems of legal interpretation.

== Gameplay ==
All aspects of Nomic are variable; the players can vote to change the rules to whatever sort of game they want to play. Peter Suber's original ruleset is one of the most commonly used, and was first published in Douglas Hofstadter's "Metamagical Themas" column in the June 1982 edition of Scientific American. Hofstadter discussed Suber's book The Paradox of Self-Amendment, in which Suber defined the game thus:

Nomic is a game in which changing the rules is a move. In that respect it differs from almost every other game. The primary activity of Nomic is proposing changes in the rules, debating the wisdom of changing them in that way, voting on the changes, deciding what can and cannot be done afterwards, and doing it. Even this core of the game, of course, can be changed.

— Peter Suber, The Paradox of Self-Amendment

Under Peter Suber's original ruleset, gameplay occurs in clockwise order, with each player taking a turn. In that turn, they propose a change in rules that all the other players vote on, and then roll a die to determine the number of points they add to their score. Each player has one vote, and if the rule change received a majority of votes, it comes into effect at the end of their turn. Any rule can be changed with varying degrees of difficulty, including the core rules of the game itself, and the rule that requires players to obey the rules. As such, the gameplay may quickly change. Players often add new subgames into the rules with new ways to gain points. The game can be played face-to-face with as many written notes as are required, or through any of a number of Internet media (usually an archived mailing list or Internet forum).

Under Suber's initial ruleset, rules are either mutable or immutable. Immutable rules take precedence over mutable ones, and must be changed into mutable rules (called transmuting) before they can be modified or removed.

While the victory condition in Suber's initial ruleset is the accumulation of 100 points by the roll of dice, he once said that "this rule is deliberately boring so that players will quickly amend it to please themselves." Any rule in the game, including the rules specifying the criteria for winning and even the rule that rules must be obeyed, can be changed.

=== Online ===
Nomic has been played online, where all proposals and rules can be shared in web pages or email archives for ease of reference. One implementation of the game, Agora, has been running since 1993. One problem with Nomics is that over time the ruleset can grow too large and complex that the players do not fully understand it. This is one reason why many Nomics consist of a small group of dedicated players, because ruleset complexity often discourages players from joining. One currently active game, BlogNomic, gets around this problem by dividing the game into "dynasties"; every time someone wins, a new dynasty begins, and all the rules except the core rules of the game are repealed. This keeps the game relatively simple and accessible. Nomicron (resumed in April 2026 after a 15-year hiatus) is similar in that it has rounds–when a player wins a round, a convention is started to plan for the next round. A game of Nomic on Reddit, nommit (now defunct), used a similar mechanism modeled on Nomicron's system.

Another facet of Nomic is the way in which the implementation of the rules affects the way the game of Nomic itself works. ThermodyNomic, for example, had a ruleset in which rule changes were carefully considered before implementation, and rules were rarely introduced which provide loopholes for the players to exploit. B Nomic, by contrast, was once described by one of its players as "the equivalent of throwing logical hand grenades".

== Variants ==
Many variants of Nomic exist, all based on Peter Suber's original rules. Most games are played with some variation on the original ruleset. Some have themes, begin with a single rule, or begin with a dictator instead of a democratic process to validate rules. Others combine Nomic with an existing game —such as Monopoly or chess, or, in one paradoxical attempt, the humorous improvisational game Mornington Crescent. Even more unusual variants include a ruleset in which the rules are hidden from players' view, and a game which, instead of allowing voting on rules, splits into two sub-games, one with the rule, and one without it.

In a computerized Nomic, the rules are interpreted by a computer, rather than by humans. This implies that the rules should be written in a language that a computer can understand, typically some sort of programming language or Game Description Language. Nomyx is such an implementation.

== See also ==
- 1000 Blank White Cards
- 21 (drinking game)
- Baba Is You
- Bartok (game)
- Calvinball
- Fluxx
- Kings (drinking game)
- Mao (card game)
