= Mornington Crescent (game) =

Improvisational comedy game

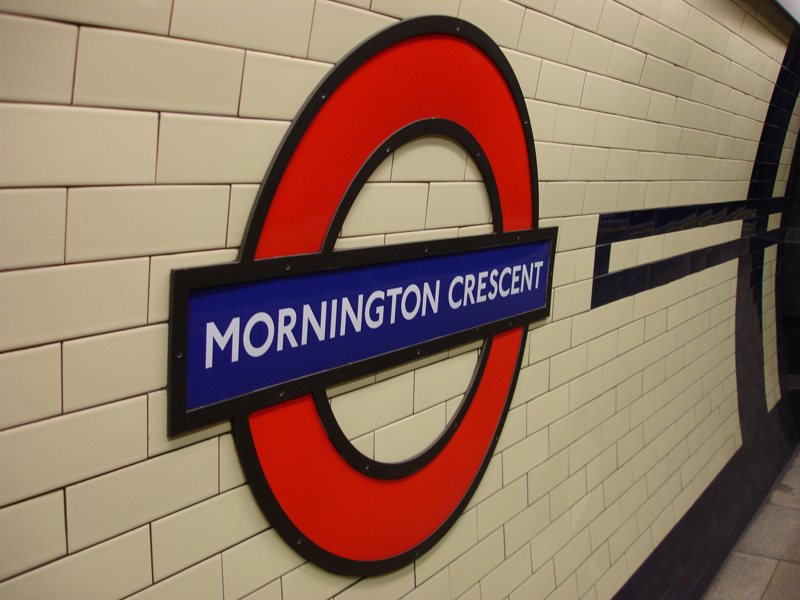
An enamel sign at Mornington Crescent station, the game's namesake

Mornington Crescent is an improvisational comedy game featured in the BBC Radio 4 comedy panel show I'm Sorry I Haven't a Clue (ISIHAC), a series that satirises panel games. An earlier game, Finchley Central, is remarkably similar.

The gameplay consists of each panellist in turn announcing a landmark or street, most often a London Underground station. The ostensible aim is to be the first to announce "Mornington Crescent", a station on the Northern line. Interspersed with the turns is humorous discussion amongst the panellists and host regarding the rules and legality of each move, as well as the strategy the panellists are using. However, as all of these rules and strategies are fictional, the actual aim of the game is to entertain the other participants and listeners by inventing and discussing them.

== Origins ==
=== Finchley Central ===
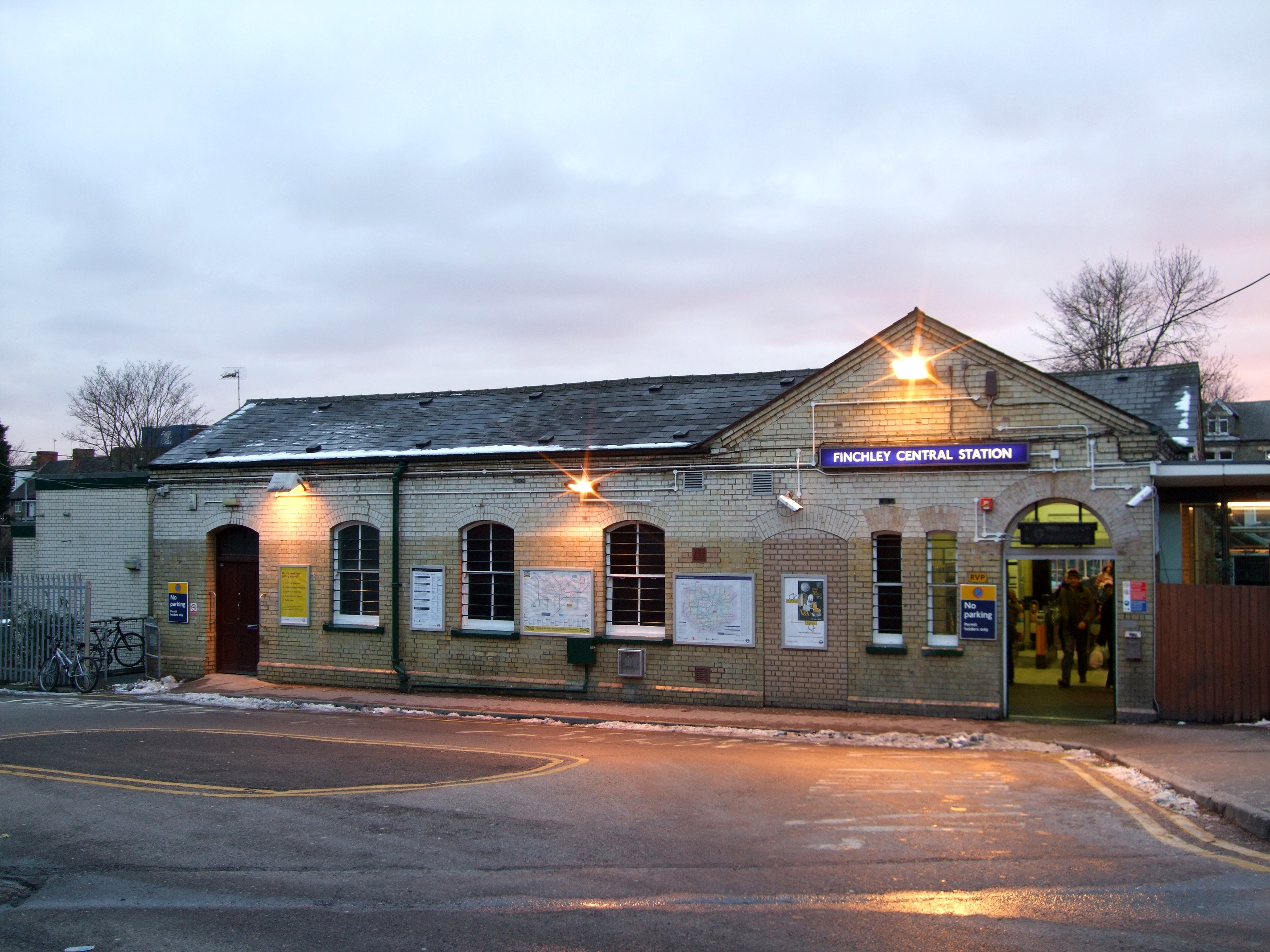
Finchley Central tube station on the Northern line

A similar game called Finchley Central was described in the Spring 1969 issue of the mathematics magazine Manifold, edited by Ian Stewart and John Jaworski at the University of Warwick. It is a humorous game in which two players take turns naming stations in the London Underground. The first person to name Finchley Central is the winner, with humour coming from the fact that there is nothing stopping either player from naming the station at any time. Mathematics professor Jonathan Partington compares Finchley Central to the concept of polite refusal, describing the reciprocity and the game's solutions to be isomorphic as he somewhat facetiously notes:

An opening move of "Finchley Central" is too much of a cheat, and you might wish to start with, say, Liverpool Street, when, assuming that your opponent isn't rude enough to reply with Finchley Central, leaves you with a mate on your second move (though you probably would prefer to stall by playing, say, Bank, in the hopes of a more spectacular win later).

Possibly inspired by The New Vaudeville Band's song "Finchley Central" ("Finchley Central / is two-and-sixpence / from Golders Green on the Northern Line..."), the game was first described by the mathematicians Anatole Beck and David Fowler in the Spring 1969 issue of Manifold magazine (A Pandora's Box of Non-games page 32). Beck and Fowler note,

It is clear that the 'best' time to say Finchley Central is exactly before your opponent does. Failing that it is good that he should be considering it. You could, of course, say 'Finchley Central' on your second turn. In that case, your opponent puffs on his cigarette and says, 'Well… Shame on you.'

A 1976 variant where the first person to think of Finchley Central station loses has been suggested as a possible origin for The Game.

Douglas Hofstadter later referred to this article in his 1985 book Metamagical Themas.

=== Mornington Crescent ===
Mornington Crescent first appeared in the opening episode of the sixth series of BBC Radio 4's comedy panel show I'm Sorry I Haven't a Clue, broadcast on 22 August 1978. Mornington Crescent seems to have made no appearance before 1978, although five episodes transmitted in 1974–1975 have been lost. It was played in every surviving episode of the sixth series. It has been played ever since, but not in every episode.

The origins of the game are not clear. One claim is that it was invented by Geoffrey Perkins, who stated in an interview that Mornington Crescent was created as a non-game. Barry Cryer, a panellist on the programme from 1972 until shortly before his death in 2022, said that Geoffrey Perkins did not invent the game, and that it had been around since the 1960s. According to longtime host Humphrey Lyttelton, the game was invented to vex a series producer who was unpopular with the panellists. One day, the team members were drinking, when they heard him coming. "Quick," said one, "let's invent a game with rules he'll never understand."

== Gameplay on I'm Sorry I Haven't a Clue ==
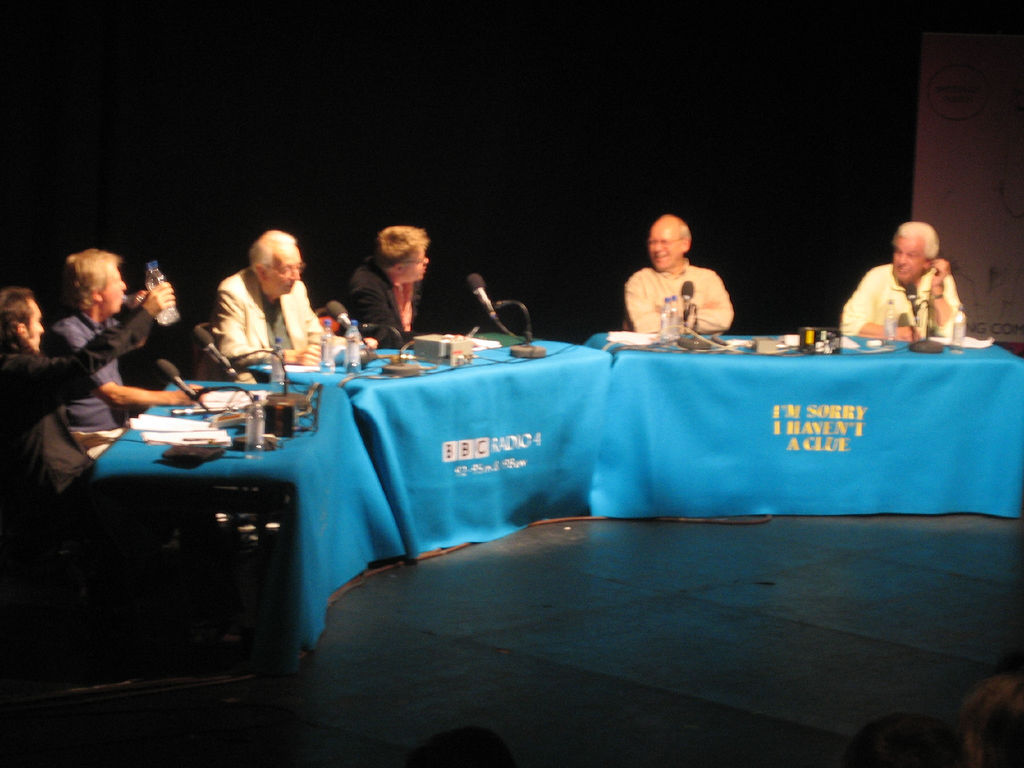
Panellists taking part at a BBC Radio recording of I'm Sorry I Haven't a Clue

Mornington Crescent gameplay involves announcing random place names in London, usually a station on the Underground system, for humorous effect.

The objective of Mornington Crescent is to give the appearance of a game with complex and long-winded rules and strategies in order to parody games in which such systems have evolved. The apparent rules are fictional, and the game's appeal to audiences lies in the ability of players to create an entertaining illusion of competitive and strategic gameplay.

Humorous variations to the rules have been introduced to games. Lyttelton would typically describe special rules to apply to a given session, such as "Trumpington's Variations" or "Tudor Court Rules", so that almost every episode of I'm Sorry I Haven't a Clue featuring Mornington Crescent introduced an ostensible variant. In one of them, first introduced in North Yorkshire, a player whose movement is blocked is considered to be "in Nidd" and is forced to remain in place for the next three moves. This tends to block the other players, putting them into Nidd as well and causing a roadblock. In one episode, every player ended up in Nidd and the rule had to be suspended so that the round could continue.

Over time, the destinations named by the panellists expanded beyond the London Underground, in accordance with various regional expansions of the game. ISIHAC is recorded around the United Kingdom, and the game is occasionally modified accordingly. There have been versions in Slough and Leeds, as well as one in Scotland played during the Edinburgh Festival Fringe and a 2016 recording in Glasgow (where the name was changed to "Morningside Crescent"). Another variation called "Morganstown Crescent" is played at recordings in Wales. In one episode, recorded in Luton, panellists named locations as far afield as the Place de l'Étoile in Paris, Nevsky Prospect in Saint Petersburg, and Pennsylvania Avenue in Washington, D.C., but a move to Luton High Street was ruled invalid for being too remote. In other episodes, an attempt was made to expand the territory to Manhattan (via Heathrow Airport and John F. Kennedy International Airport) but there was some disagreement as to whether or not the New York City Subway was suited to the game. References have been made in various episodes of ISIHAC to international versions of the game, including "Mornington Croissant" (based on the Paris Metro) and "Mornington Peninsula" (an Australian variant). At least one full game of Mornington Croissant was played on air.

A regular feature that introduces Mornington Crescent is a letters section which begins with the host's comments (e.g. "I notice from the sheer weight of this week's postbag, we've received a little over no letters" or "I see from the number of letters raining down on us this week that the Scrabble factory has exploded again"). The selected letter each week is invariably from "A Mrs. Trellis of North Wales", who usually mistakes the host for another Radio 4 presenter or media personality.

== Further popularity ==
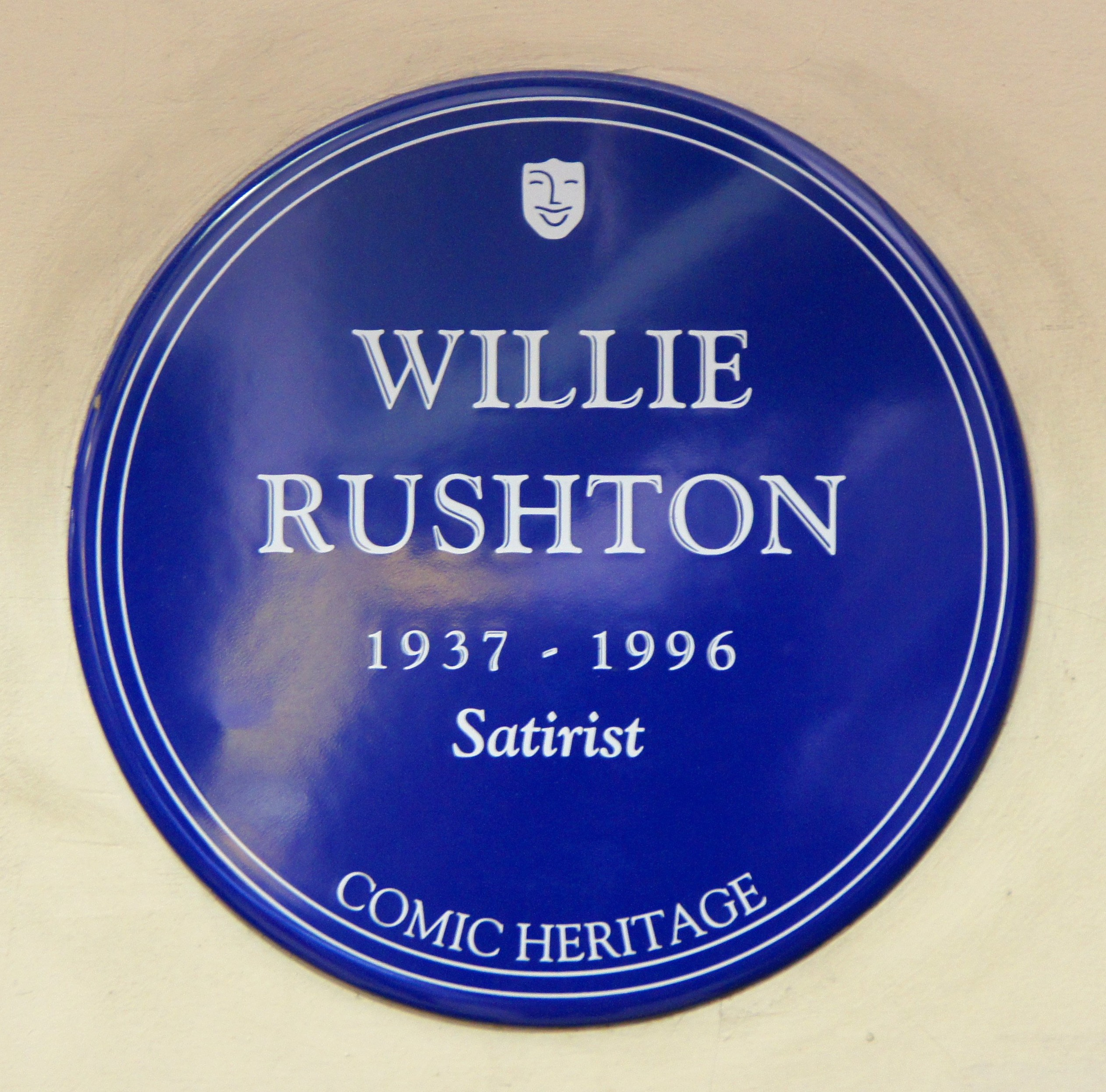
A blue plaque commemorating Willie Rushton in Mornington Crescent station

Finchley Central and Mornington Crescent have been played as a play-by-mail pastime, and in the 1980s were played by post in a number of play-by-mail magazines. One format involved a series of elimination rounds, with everyone except the winner of the current round going forward onto the next.

A computer version of the game for the BBC Micro was included in the April 1985 edition of The Micro User magazine. Due to space restrictions, the rules for the game were not published but were promised for the next month's edition, along with an explanation by a member of the Society for the Support of Mornington Crescent, Dr. Richard Taylor-Fischel. Unfortunately, in that edition on the Letters page, p. 121, he took umbrage at the modifications to the game that had been necessary to produce a computer program and consequently withdrew his collaboration, using the name Dr. R. T. Fischel PhD and bar.

Online versions of the game have been played on Usenet, web forums, and the London Underground itself. A Mornington Crescent Facebook application has also been produced.

When Mornington Crescent station itself was reopened in 1998 after six years of closure for lift repairs, London Transport invited the ISIHAC team to perform an opening ceremony. A memorial blue plaque to Willie Rushton, one of the show's longest-serving panelists, was installed at the station in 2002.

== Spin-offs and publications ==
At Christmas 1984, Radio 4 broadcast Everyman's Guide to Mornington Crescent, a "two-part documentary" on the history of the game and its rules, presented by Raymond Baxter. At the end of part one, it was announced that part two had been postponed due to "scheduling difficulties".

Another documentary was broadcast on Christmas Eve 2005. It was named In Search of Mornington Crescent, and narrated by Andrew Marr. This has since also been released on a BBC Audiobook CD.

Two books of rules and history have been published, The Little Book of Mornington Crescent (2001; ISBN 0-7528-1864-3), by Graeme Garden, Tim Brooke-Taylor, Barry Cryer and Humphrey Lyttelton, and Stovold's Mornington Crescent Almanac (2001; ISBN 0-7528-4815-1), by Graeme Garden.

== See also ==
- The Button (Reddit)
- Calvinball
- Catch-22 (logic)
- Finite and Infinite Games
- Guyball, from the sitcom Green Wing
- In-joke
- Infohazard
- List of games with concealed rules
- The Game (mind game)
- Meme
- Nomic
- Numberwang, from the television show That Mitchell and Webb Look
- Paradox
- Zendo (game)
- Tegwar, from the novel Bang the Drum Slowly and its film adaptation
