= Penultima =

Chess variant derivation game played on a chess board

Penultima is a game of inductive logic, played on a chess board. It was invented by Michael Greene and Adam Chalcraft in Cambridge in 1994. The game is derived from the chess variant Ultima (otherwise known as Baroque chess), a different chess variant with all pieces replaced by fairy pieces with their own mechanics. Penultima is played with a standard chess board and pieces, each piece having different movement and capture rules from standard chess. In a manner similar to the game Mao, which was a popular game in Cambridge at that time, the rules for each piece vary from game to game, and are initially kept secret from the players. Penultima is similar in style to Eleusis, Zendo and Mao. The name of the game is a pun on "penultimate" and "Ultima".

== Rules ==
Several Spectators create secret rules which govern how the pieces move and two Players attempt to discover these rules. The game is traditionally played with chess pieces but may be played with any sufficiently distinct components, such as coins or Icehouse pieces.

Before the game starts, the Spectators decide between themselves which pieces they will write rules for. The secret rule for a piece may for example control the way that piece moves, captures, or is captured, and may cause it to affect other pieces on the board. A piece may be given an invoke command which causes it to affect other pieces on the board without moving. When the secret rule for a piece is written, the Spectator also gives it a new name for the duration of the game. These names, and the existence of any invoke commands, are announced to the players at the start of the game. During the game the spectators may privately discuss how their rules interact.

On their turn, a Player attempts to move or invoke one of their pieces, and the Spectator for that piece declares whether the action is legal or illegal. If it is legal, the movement or invocation is done, then that Player's turn ends and play passes to the other Player. If it is illegal, the piece is returned to its position at the start of the turn. In the original game, play then passes to the other Player; in other variants the original Player continues making attempts until he succeeds in making a legal move or invoke. If the player is in "check", they can repeatedly attempt moves until able to get out of check.

As in standard chess, the winning player is the one who forces his or her opponent's king (or equivalent piece) into checkmate. At the end of the game, the Spectators reveal their rules.

More recently, the game has taken on a more freeform structure - it can be any chess-like game where the rules are hidden from the players and where moves can be attempted until a legal move is found, at which point it is played. To accommodate the rules being able to be heavily divergent from the original rules of chess, sometimes additional forms of information gathering can be provided to the player. Once such option would be to allow each player to ask a yes/no question of the judges every set number of moves.

== See also ==
- Fairy chess piece
