= Keg stand =

Drinking game

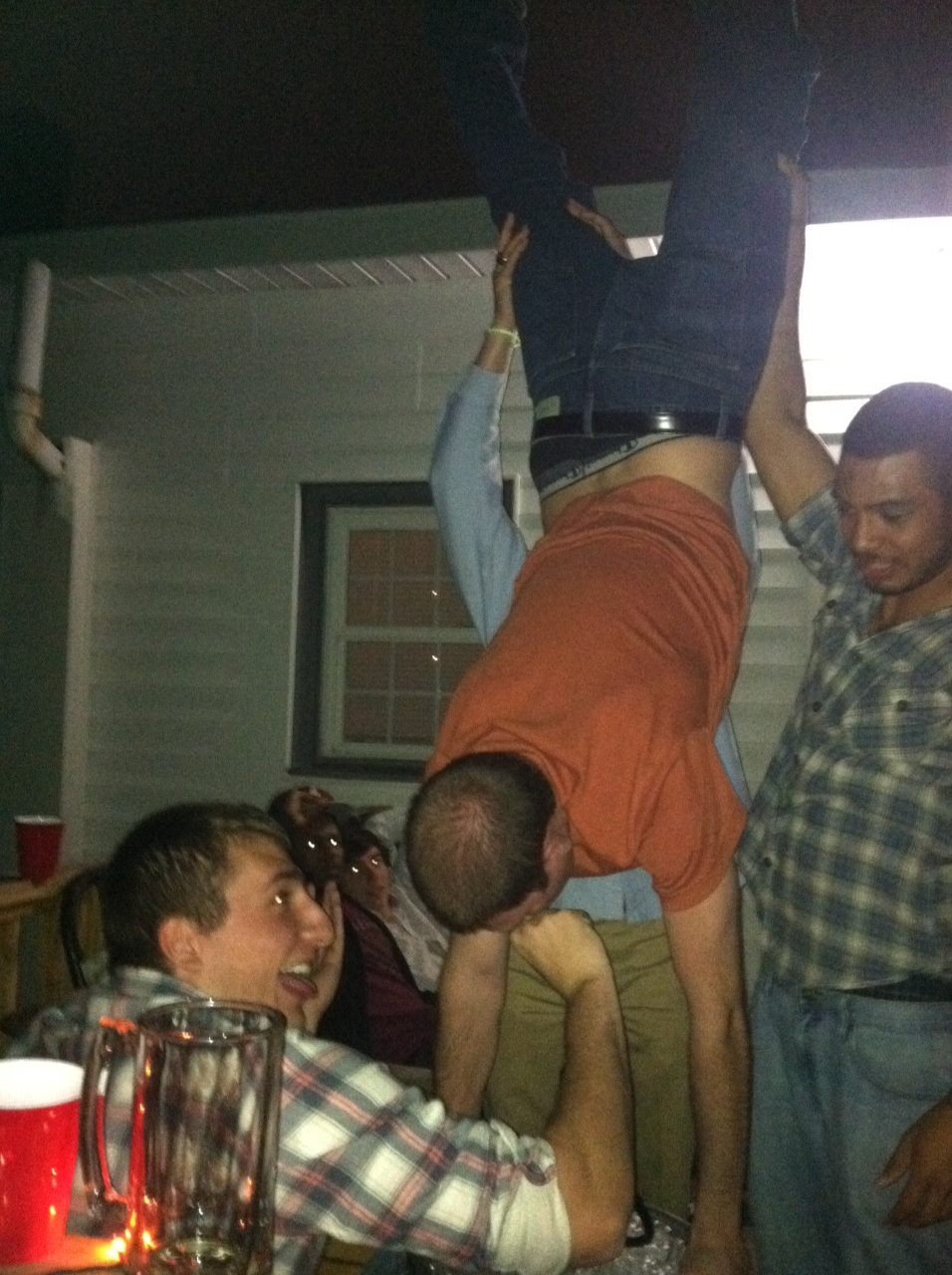
A keg stand in Raleigh, North Carolina, in 2012

A keg stand is a drinking activity where the participant does a handstand on a keg of beer and attempts to drink as much as possible at once or to drink for as long as possible. Other people will help to hold up the drinker's legs, and will hold the keg tap in the stander's mouth, as the stander will have both hands occupied with the handstand.

== Origin ==
The origin of the keg stand is unclear, but it is a staple in American college culture, especially in fraternities and jamborees. They are frequently featured in popular media depicting fraternity or sorority events.

== Potential hazards ==
Naturally, keg stands exhibit the same risks as performing a regular handstand, which may increase in severity due to the alcoholic side effects of the beer itself.

Drinking a large amount of beer, especially during a single sitting, may cause alcohol poisoning or overdose. Side effects include dizziness, nausea, increased blood alcohol concentration, and potentially permanent damage to the brain, liver, and other organs.

In September 2002, Seth Korona, a student at Indiana University, was killed after falling and hitting his head on a door frame after doing a keg stand. His friends, believing he was hungover, ignored him until he was transported to the hospital and died shortly after.
