= Redhurst Academy of Magic Student Handbook =

Tabletop role-playing game supplement

Redhurst Academy of Magic Student Handbook is a 2003 role-playing game supplement published by Human Head Studios for the d20 System.

== Contents ==
Redhurst Academy of Magic Student Handbook details the Redhurst Academy of Magic, and features d20 System rules, including new spells, feats, prestige classes, monsters, and magic items.

== Reception ==
Redhurst Academy of Magic Student Handbook won the 2003 Origins Awards for Best Book Design and Best Role-Playing Game Supplement.

Redhurst Academy of Magic Student Handbook won the 2004 Silver ENnie Awards for Best Cartography, Best Graphic Design and Layout, and Best Campaign Setting.

== Reviews ==
- Pyramid
- Fictional Reality #14
