= Eleusis (card game) =

Inductive logic card game

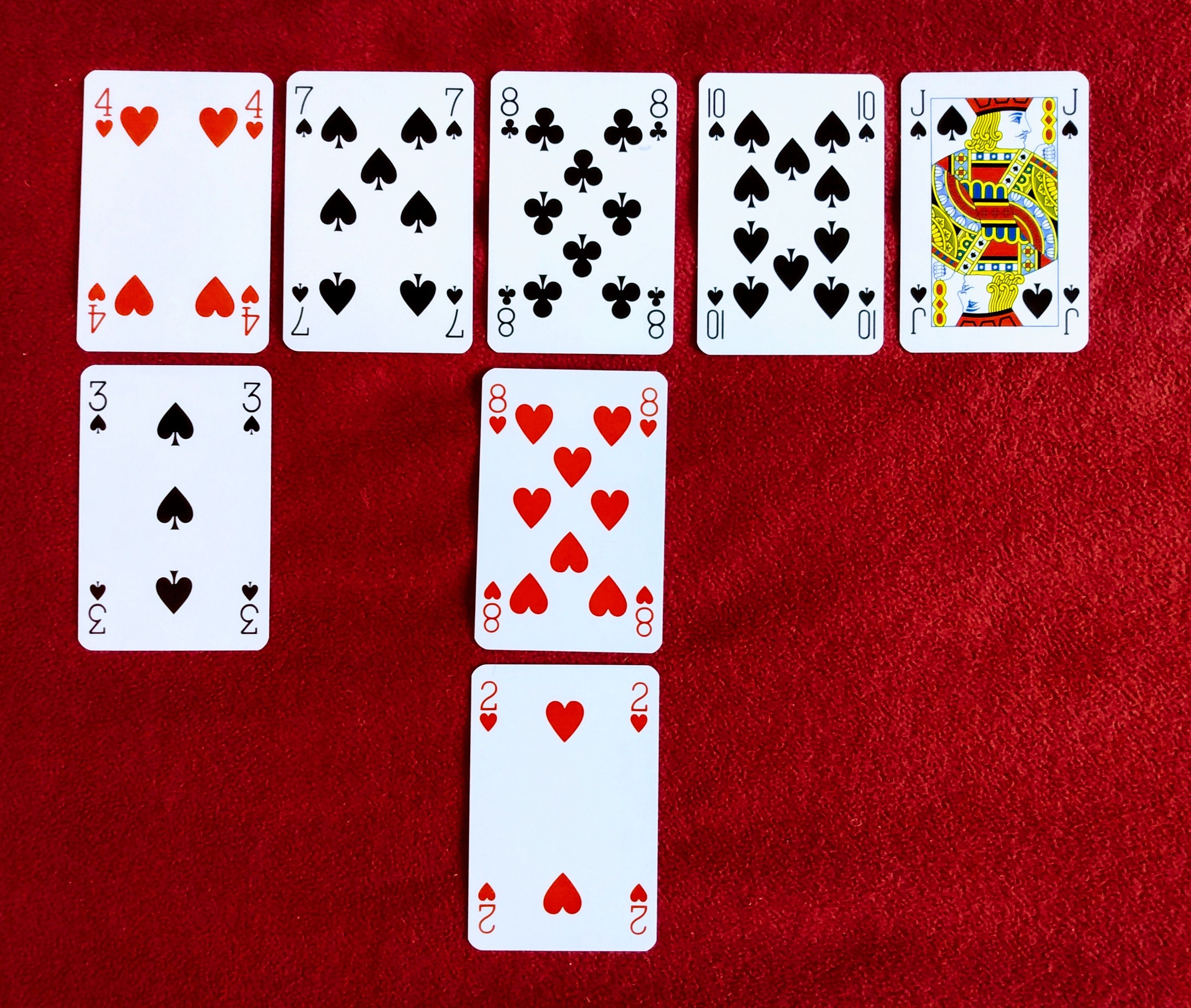
- A game in progress: the top row is a sequence of valid plays, the cards below are past, invalid plays. (The game began with a 4 of hearts, followed by an invalid play of the 3 of spades, then a valid play of the 7 of spades.)
- Type: Inductive logic
- Players: 3–8 (best with 4 or 5)
- Skills: Invention, induction
- Cards: Single Deck of 52 or Double Deck of 104
- Deck: French-suited
- Playing time: 60 minutes upwards
- Chance: Low

Related games
- Mao

Eleusis is a shedding-type card game where one player chooses a secret rule to determine which cards can be played on top of others, and the other players attempt to determine the rule using inductive logic.

The game was invented by Robert Abbott in 1956, and was first published by Martin Gardner in his Mathematical Games column in Scientific American magazine in June 1959. A revised version appeared in Gardner's July 1977 column.

Eleusis is sometimes considered an analogy to the problems of scientific method. It can be compared with the card game Mao, which also has secret rules that can be learned inductively. The games of Penultima and commercially produced Zendo also feature players attempting to discover inductively a secret rule or rules thought of by a "Master" or "spectators" who declare plays legal or illegal on the basis of the rules.

== Rules ==
The game is played by creating a row of cards in sequence. At the start of the game the dealer (known as "God") invents a secret constraint for how these cards must progress: for example, "each card played must be higher than the last, unless the last card was a face card, in which case any numeral card may be played".

Two decks of cards are shuffled and 14 cards dealt to each player except the dealer. One card is dealt face-up to start the row and a random player chosen to start.

On a player's turn they must add one or more cards from their hand to the row, in sequence. The dealer judges this play: if the entire play fits the dealer's rule, the cards are left in place as part of the row. Otherwise, they are removed from the row and "sidelined", as to be put below the card that they attempted to follow, and the player is dealt a number of penalty cards equal to twice the number of cards they attempted to play that turn. If the play had multiple cards and only some were incorrect, the entire play is declared invalid, without the dealer specifying the invalid cards.

One player may elect to be a "prophet". A player who believes they have worked out the rule may request to become one at the end of their turn, if there is not already a prophet among the players, by placing a black marker on the card they just played. The prophet puts down their hand and skips their turns during their time as prophet. The prophet takes on the role of judging valid and invalid moves; if the dealer catches them making a mistake, the prophet is overthrown and receives five penalty cards (with the player who made the play receiving no penalty cards for that turn, if the play was invalid). An overthrown prophet takes their hand back up, takes all black markers off the row, and becomes a regular player again.

If at any time a player thinks they cannot play a legitimate card, they may declare a "no play", and show their hand to everybody. If the dealer confirms that no cards in that hand can be played, the player discards the hand and draws a new hand four cards smaller. If the player's call was incorrect, the dealer plays the correct card for them and gives the player five penalty cards.

A white marker is placed on each tenth card played, and a black marker on each tenth card after a prophet's marker. After the fourth black or white marker is placed, any invalid plays result in that player being eliminated from the game, and their hand remains intact for scoring. If both white and black markers are present, the black markers take precedence.

A round ends when a player empties their hand, or when all players (excluding the prophet, if any) have been eliminated. Players score 1 point for each card in the hand of the player with most cards (this number is the high count), minus the number of cards in their own hand. If a player has an empty hand they gain a further 4 points. If there is a prophet at the end of the game, they receive an additional 1 point for each card in the row following their first black marker, and 2 points for each sidelined card following that marker. The dealer's score equals the highest score of any player, unless there was an active prophet. If there was an active prophet, count the cards (right and wrong) played up to and including the card with the prophet marker and double this number. Dealer's score is the smaller of the highest player score (including the prophet) and the doubled card total. The winner is determined by the total of all rounds, and if the game ended before all players have had a chance to deal, every player who has never dealt get 10 more points in compensation.

== Scoring Examples ==
See the rules section for scoring details.

Example Round 1 (No prophet)
Player	Remaining Cards	Round Score
1	10	0
2	8	2
3	5	5
4	0	14
God (Dealer)	N/A	14

Player 1 has the most cards remaining and gets no points. Player 2 has 2 fewer cards than P1 so they get 2 points. Player 3 gets 5 points. Player 4 gets 10 plus 4 additional points for shedding all their cards. The dealer's score equals the highest player score so they also get 14 points.

Example Round 2 (Has prophet)
Player	Remaining Cards	Round Score
1	10	0
2 (Prophet)	8	23
3	5	5
4	0	14
God (Dealer)	N/A	22

This round ended with player 2 as a prophet. Player 1 has the most cards remaining and gets no points. Player 3 gets 5 points. Player 4 gets 14 points. Player 2 gets 2 points from their card count; they also correctly chose 5 valid cards and 8 invalid cards after they became prophet so they get an additional 21 points ($5+2*8$).

Player 2 became a prophet after the 11th card was played and placed the first black marker on that card. The dealer's score equals the lesser of 23 and 22 ($2*11$) (highest player score & doubled card count up to and including first black marker) so the dealer gets 22.

== Eleusis Express ==
In 2006, John Golden developed a streamlined version of the game, intended to assist elementary school teachers in explaining the scientific method to students. It has the following differences:

- The game starts with 12 cards in each player's hand, not 14.
- The game has no prophet, instead allowing players to openly guess the rule whenever they make a valid play.
- A "no play" hand results in a 1 card penalty if incorrect, or a redrawing of a hand one card smaller if correct.
- The game is played until a player empties their hand or makes a correct guess: at that point, each player scores 12 minus the number of cards left in their hand, with a 6-point bonus for correctly guessing the rule and a 3-point bonus for emptying one's hand. The dealer scores the same as the highest-scoring player.

Abbott himself considered the variant a "great game", and referred to it as "Eleusis Express".
