= Flip cup =

Drinking game

Flip Cup
Drinking Game
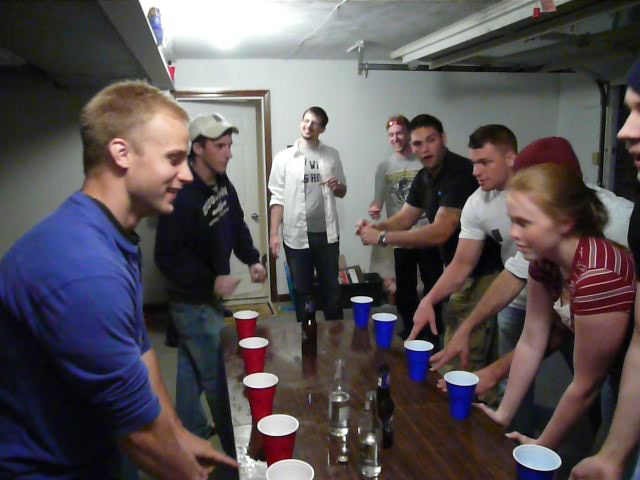
- A game of flip cup about to begin (2007)
- Players: 4+
- Setup time: 2–3 minutes
- Playing time: As long as teams choose
- Chance: Easy
- Skills: Cup-flipping, Beer-chugging

Flip cup is a team-based drinking game where players must, in turn, drain a plastic cup of beer and then "flip" the cup so that it lands face-down on the table. If the cup falls off the table, any player can return said cup to the playing field. Several flip cup tournaments have been held in the United States.

A 2017 survey by the American Addiction Centers found flip cup to be the most quickly intoxicating drinking game played by those surveyed, with participants being able to reach a theoretical blood alcohol content of 0.08, the legal driving limit, within 20 minutes of play.

== Gameplay ==
An animation of the Flip Cup action

Two teams of an equal number of players stand on opposite sides of a table, facing one another. The players directly facing are opponents. In front of each teammate is a disposable plastic cup filled with a set amount of beer. Generally, the first line inside a disposable cup is used as a marker.

At the start, it is customary for the initiating players to make a toast, after which the first member of each team drinks the entirety of their beverage. When finished, the cup is placed open side up at the edge of the table, and the player who drank it attempts to flip the cup, by flicking or lifting the bottom of the cup until it flips and lands face down on the table, If a cup is knocked over in the chain whilst moving to the next cup the player must go back and re-flip. The player may not use two hands, or blow on the cup to guide it to flip over. If the player is unsuccessful on the first try, the cup is reset and re-flipped. Only after the first teammate is done flipping successfully can the next person proceed. Additionally, subsequent players may not touch or manipulate their cup until the previous player has successfully flipped their cup. Whichever team finishes drinking and flipping all its cups first wins.
