= Zendo (game) =

Inductive logic game

The Game of Inductive Logic
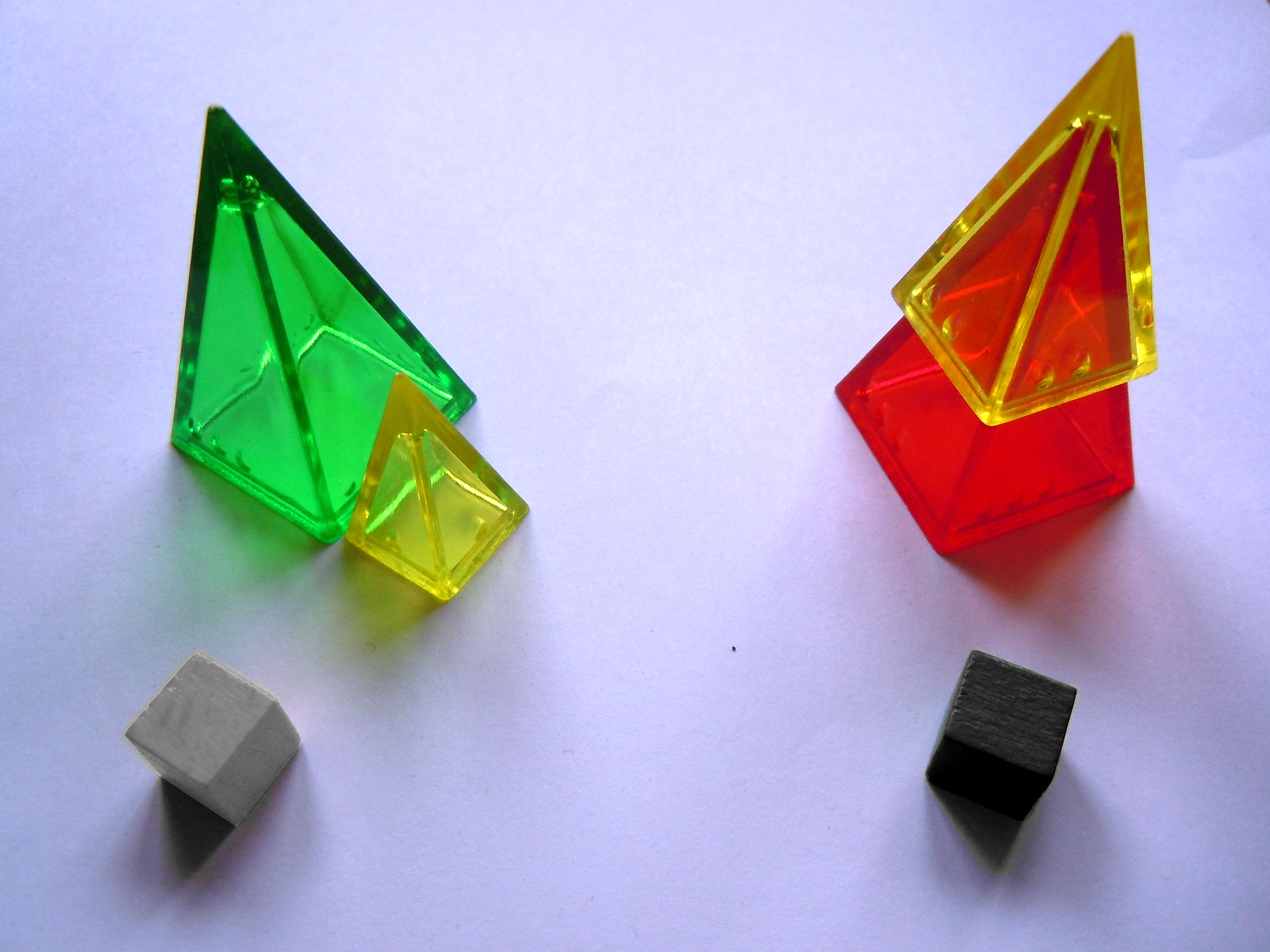
- The beginning of a game of Zendo. According to the marker stones, the koan on the left follows the Master's rule, but the one on the right does not.
- Designers: Kory Heath
- Publishers: Looney Labs
- Publication: December 31, 1999; 26 years ago
- Genres: Mind sport
- Players: 2–6
- Setup time: < 5 minutes
- Playing time: 15–60 minutes
- Chance: Low
- Skills: Inductive reasoning, Pattern recognition
- Materials required: Icehouse pieces for the first edition or custom plastic blocks for later editions; rule cards; black, white, and green stones
- Ages: 12 and up
- Website: Designer publisher

Zendo is a game of inductive logic designed by Kory Heath in which one player (the "Master") creates a rule for structures ("koans") to follow, and the other players (the "Students") try to discover it by building and studying various koans which follow or break the rule. The first student to correctly state the rule wins.

Zendo can be compared to the card game Eleusis and the chess variant Penultima in which players attempt to discover inductively a secret rule thought of by one or more players (called "God" or "Nature" in Eleusis and "Spectators" in Penultima) who declare plays legal or illegal on the basis of their rules. It can also be compared to Petals Around the Rose, a similar inductive reasoning puzzle where the "secret rule" is always the same.

The game can be played with any set of colorful playing pieces, and has been sold with a set of 60 Icehouse pyramids in red, yellow, green, and blue, 60 glass stones and a small deck of cards containing simple rules for beginners. The Icehouse pieces were replaced in the second edition with blocks, single size pyramids and wedges. Origami pyramids are a common choice of playing piece.

== History ==
The rules were published in 2001 after more than a year of playtests and changes. In 2004, the Zendo boxed set won Best Abstract Board Game of 2003 at the Origins Awards. In 2005, the set won the Mensa Select Game Award. Zendo is also published in Looney Labs' Playing with Pyramids, a book of rules and strategies for a dozen popular games playable with Icehouse pieces.

In December 2017, the company reissued Zendo game separate from the Looney pyramids line for the first time. The Icehouse pyramids were replaced by blocks, single size pyramids and wedges. Buddhist terminology were also removed from the instructions. In August 2018, Zendo Rules Expansion #1 was released, adding 10 rule cards to the game.

== Gameplay ==
Within Zendo, most players are known as Students, who will build structures of pieces known as koans. Before play, one player (known as the Master) will invent a secret Rule, such as "a koan has the Buddha-nature if and only if it contains one or more green pieces". The Master then builds two koans - one which follows the rule and one which does not. These are marked with a white and black stone respectively.

Students then take turns to build koans. After building a koan, a student may call either "Master" or "Mondo":

- Master: The Master determines whether that Student's koan follows or breaks the Rule (also stylized as: "possesses or lacks the Buddha-nature", in fitting with the game's philosophical theme) and marks it with a white or black stone accordingly.
- Mondo: Each Student guesses whether the koan follows or breaks the rule, by holding a black or white stone in their hand. The Master marks whether the koan follows the rule, and stones are revealed simultaneously: Students who guessed correctly are awarded a Guessing Stone.

At the end of their turn, a Student may spend Guessing Stones to guess the Master's Rule. If the guess is wrong, the Master may build and mark a new koan (which either fits the Master's Rule but not the Student's guess, or vice versa) to prove this. The first student to correctly state the rule wins that round and becomes the new Master.

== Philosophy of play ==
Zendo encourages inductive reasoning and scientific thinking due to the nature of the guessing process. Players are encouraged to think critically while playing the game.

Although it is possible to 'win' Zendo by correctly stating a rule, there are no losers. Every player benefits from observing and following play. Furthermore, Masters may 'win' as well, by choosing a challenging, yet simple Rule.

== Koan attributes ==
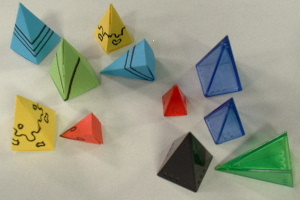
A selection of commercially-made plastic Icehouse pieces, and home-made paper pyramids

Pieces tend to be objects with multiple discrete distinguishing attributes; for example, Icehouse pieces, folded paper pyramids or Lego blocks. Using these, it is possible to create many different parts inside a koan. A partial list of koan attributes is below.

1. Size of pieces
2. Shape of pieces
3. Color of pieces
4. Number of pieces
5. Relative orientation ("pointing at another piece/parallel to another piece") of pieces
6. Groundedness (pieces supported entirely by other pieces are not "grounded") of pieces

== Awards ==
- Zendo won the 2003 Origins Award for "Abstract Board Game".
- Zendo was named one of the 2005 Mensa Select games by American Mensa.

== Reviews ==
- Family Games: The 100 Best
