= Astika (beer) =

Bulgarian beer brand

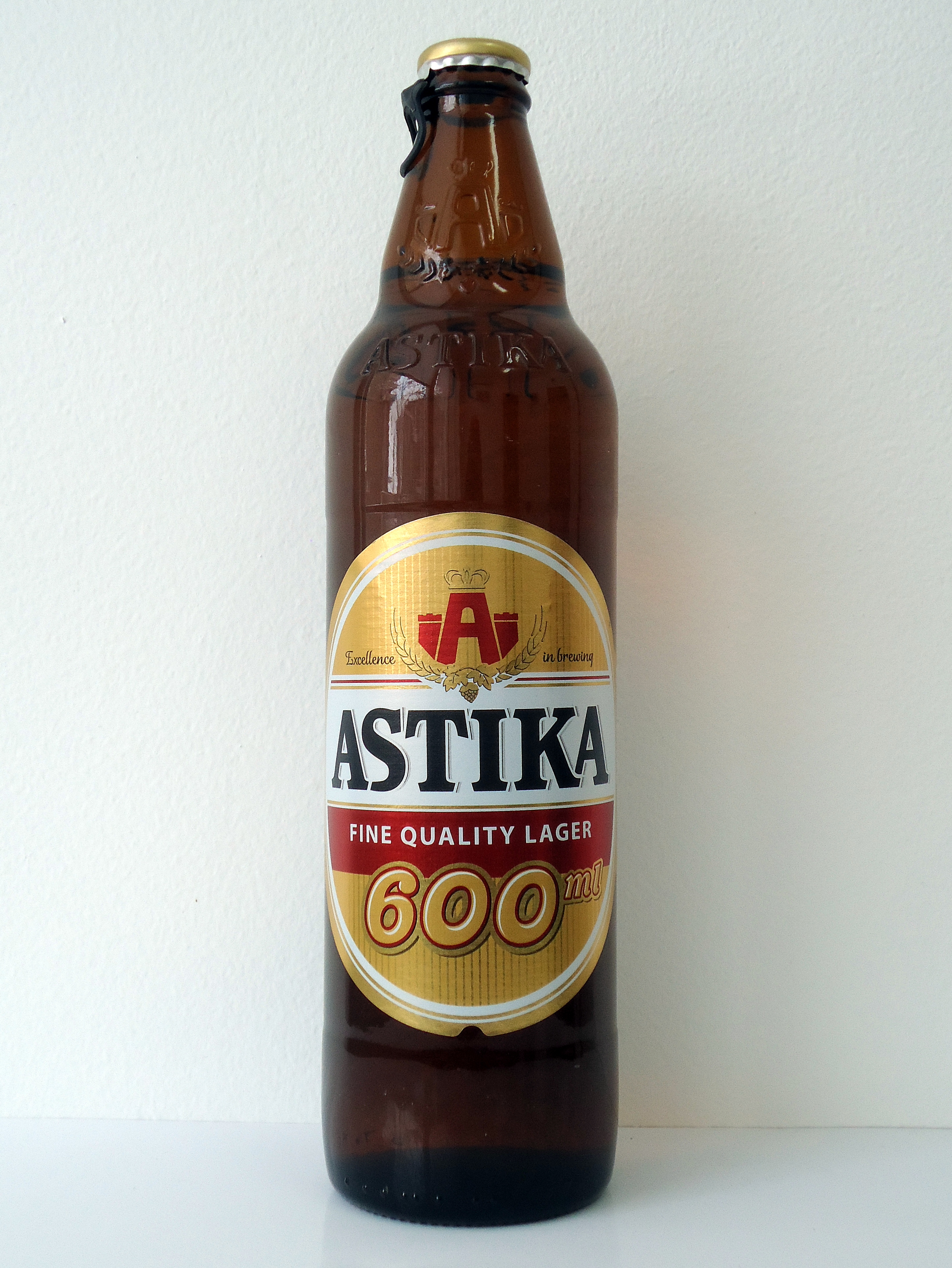

Astika is a Bulgarian beer brand made in the city of Haskovo (Bulgarian: Астика). The Astika Brewery was established in 1980, and in 1995 was bought by Kamenitza, itself currently owned by Molson Coors. It has two brands – Astika Light (originally Astika Lux) and Astika Dark (5.6%, sold in winter). As of 2012, Astika is sold in 600 ml bottles, with a pull-off top, as well as 500ml cans as of 2017 that are priced at 1.05 лв Bulgarian lev
