= World Series of Beer Pong =

International beer pong competition

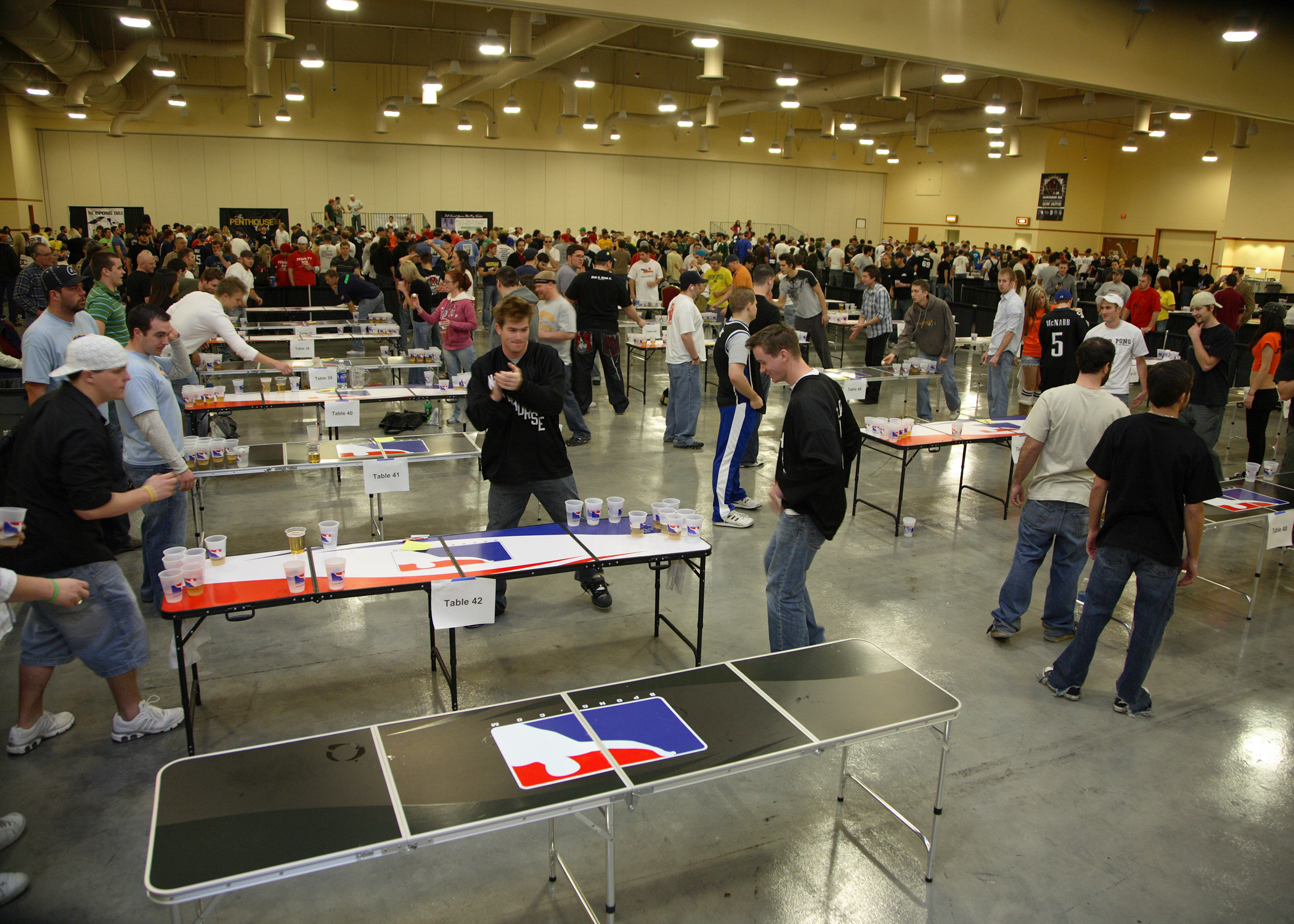
Players compete in Day 2 Preliminary rounds at The World Series of Beer Pong III, Jan 1-5, 2008, South Point Casino, Las Vegas, NV.

The World Series of Beer Pong (WSOBP) is the largest beer pong tournament in the world in number of participants and cash prizes offered. It has been held in the Las Vegas area since January 2006.

== History ==
=== WSOBP I ===
WSOBP I, originally known only as “The World Series of Beer Pong”, was held at the Oasis Hotel and Casino in Mesquite, NV from January 2 through January 6, 2006. Approximately 80 teams from the United States and Canada competed for the $10,000 grand prize.

The two teammates met while competing as athletes at the University of Michigan. Nick Velissaris was a member of the school's varsity wrestling team, while Jason Coben was a diver on the school's varsity swimming and diving team. Jason won the 2003 NCAA Championship in Platform Diving.

- Winners - Team France
- 2nd - Slippery Fetus

=== WSOBP II ===
The World Series of Beer Pong II, or WSOBP II, was again held at the Oasis Hotel and Casino in Mesquite, NV, from January 1 through January 5, 2007. The grand prize was doubled from the previous year to $20,000. The increased prize, along with increased public awareness of the event, helped draw 246 teams. The grand prize was won by Antonio “Tone” Vassilatos and Aniello “Neil” Guerriero of “We Own Your Face”. This team had competed in WSOBP I, going undefeated during the preliminary rounds, but dropping out early in the finals.

A documentary entitled “Last Cup: Road to the World Series of Beer Pong” was produced leading up to and at the event. The film focused on four characters and their preparations of WSOBP II: Jamie “The Champ” Clouser, Scott “Iceman” Reck, Sean Foster, and one of the eventual tournament winners, Antonio “Tone” Vassilatos. The documentary premiered at Cinevegas 2008.

- Winners - We own Your Face
- 2nd - PWNTrain

=== WSOBP III ===
The World Series of Beer Pong III, or WSOBP III, was the first World Series of Beer Pong to be held within the limits of Las Vegas, NV. The tournament was held at the South Point Hotel and Casino from January 1 through January 5, 2008. 296 teams competed for a $50,000 grand prize. The event was won by Jeremy Hughes and Mike Orr of the team “Chauffeuring the Fat Kid”. The final match proved to be high drama, as Chauffeuring the Fat Kid was forced to sink four consecutive cups to stay alive. They were able to do this, forcing overtime, and were able to defeat their opponents from Albany, NY - Chris Baker and Mike Hulse of “The Iron Wizard Coalition”, for the title.

- Winners - Chauffeuring the Fat Kid
- 2nd - The Iron Wizard Coalition

=== WSOBP IV ===
The World Series of Beer Pong IV was held January 1 through 5, 2009 at the Flamingo Hotel and Casino on the Las Vegas Strip. The tournament paid out a $50,000 grand prize, and was sponsored by Pabst Blue Ribbon.

The final match was announced by veteran UFC announcer Bruce Buffer

- Winners - Smashing Time
- 2nd - Getcha Popcorn Ready

=== WSOBP V ===
In 2010 The World Series of Beer Pong again broke its size record, with a field of 483 teams, including international competitors hailing from as far as Ireland and Japan. The event saw an unprecedented level of media and celebrity attention, with crews on hand to cover the event from Maxim, G4 and the Jay Leno Show. Bruce Buffer again returned to announce the final game, and DJ Whoo Kid, celebrity DJ to 50 Cent's G-Unit, was signed to DJ the event.

- Winners - Smashing Time
- 2nd - Since Sliced Bread

=== WSOBP VI ===
This year's event in 2011 – the largest in WSOBP history – drew 507 teams from 48 U.S. states, six Canadian provinces and nine countries, as well as more than a thousand spectators. Some players were skilled winners of the more than 200 Satellite™ Tournaments; others simply paid the entry fee, and played for the fun and camaraderie. All had a chance at the prize money with a guaranteed 12 games over two days and the chance to advance to the finals on day three. In addition to the main competition, several side events were held at The Flamingo and O’Sheas Casino, including East vs. West, Singles, Ladies, International and Co-Ed tournaments, with prize money totaling $65,000.

- Winners - Standing Ovation
- 2nd - Unstoppable Since Inception

=== WSOBP VII ===
This year's event drew 480 teams from 48 U.S. states and 14 countries, as well as more than a thousand spectators who received free samples from event sponsors NüVo Condoms and Twang Beer Salt. Some players were skilled winners of the more than 200 satellite qualifiers; others simply paid the entry fee to enjoy the fun, camaraderie and sportsmanship. All had a chance at the prize money with a guaranteed 12 games over two days and the chance to advance to the finals on day three. In addition to the main competition, several side events were held, including East vs. West, Men's and Women's Singles, Co-Ed, International and Random Draw tournaments, with prize money totalling $65,000.

- Winners - Seek N Destroy
- 2nd - Boozingear.com Presents ‘Who is Bobby Williams'

=== WSOBP VIII ===
WSOBP VIII was held at The Flamingo Las Vegas Casino and Hotel on January 1–5, 2013. There was a $50,000 Grand Prize and a $5,000 costume prize.

- Winner: Drinkin Smokin Straight West Coastin
- 2nd Place: Smashing Time

=== WSOBP IX ===
- Winner: Jurrasic Pong
- 2nd Place: Blitzkrieg

=== WSOBP X ===
- Winner: Pity The Fool
- 2nd Place: Wetback Wasted

=== WSOBP XI ===
- Winner: History in the Making
- 2nd Place: Blitzkrieg

=== WSOBP XII ===
- Winner: Blitzkrieg
- 2nd Place: White Girl Wasted

=== WSOBP XIII ===
- Winner: Warren Sebbane
- 2nd Place: Brewtality

=== WSOBP XIV ===
- Winner: Troop Unchained
- 2nd Place: Ultra Instinct

=== Format ===
WSOBP IV was structured as a three-day event, with tournament matches scheduled for January 2, 3, and 4. The first two days are preliminary rounds, with each team playing 6 games per day, for a total of 12 games. The 128 highest ranked teams from preliminaries qualified for finals on day 3. The final day filtered the 128 teams down to 64 teams who were then entered into a double-elimination bracket for the championships. Smashing time won this event making them 2X champs.

=== Equipment ===
All games at the WSOBP and all WSOBP Satellite Tournaments are played using 8Ft. Beer Pong Tables, 16 oz. cups, and 40mm 3-star Beer Pong balls, all manufactured and sold by BPONG.COM.

=== Rules ===
According to BPONG.COM, The World Series of Beer Pong official rules were designed with three purposes in mind:

1. Fairness to all players
2. Efficiency in running a maximum number of games simultaneously
3. Minimization of possible disputes between participants.

== Satellite Tournaments ==
While entrance to the WSOBP can be purchased, many teams gain entrance to the World Series of Beer Pong by winning a WSOBP Satellite Tournament. WSOBP Satellite Tournaments are smaller regional tournaments held by local bars and Beer Pong leagues that offer entrance into the WSOBP as the grand prize. These events are operated in accordance with WSOBP standard rules, and use the official equipment (cups, balls, and tables) of the World Series of Beer Pong.

== See also ==
- Marathon du Médoc
- List of drinking games
- Long-distance race involving alcohol
