= Bruce Buffer =

American announcer (born 1957)

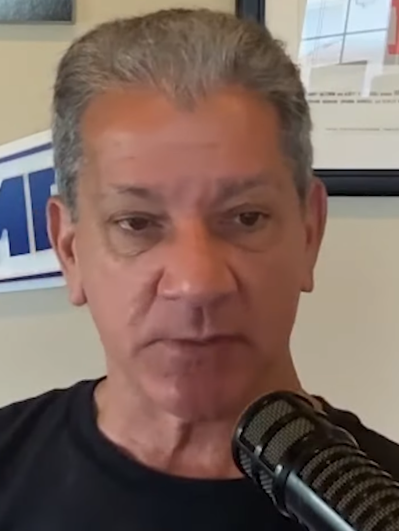
- Bruce Buffer in 2023
- Born: May 21, 1957 (age 69); West Tulsa, Oklahoma, U.S.
- Other name: Veteran voice of the Octagon
- Occupation: UFC Announcer
- Years active: 1996–present
- Known for: Octagon announcer for UFC events
- Height: 5 ft 11 in (1.80 m)
- Title: 2nd degree black belt in Tang Soo Do green belt in Judo
- Relatives: Michael Buffer (half-brother)
- Website: BruceBuffer.com

Bruce Anthony Buffer (born May 21, 1957) is an American professional mixed martial arts ring announcer and the official octagon announcer for the Ultimate Fighting Championship (UFC) events, introduced on broadcasts as the "Veteran Voice of the Octagon". Buffer's catchphrase is "It's time!", which he announces before the main event of a UFC card. He is the half-brother of boxing and professional wrestling ring announcer Michael Buffer, and is the president and CEO of their company, The Buffer Partnership. Buffer holds a black belt in Tang Soo Do and has fought as a kickboxer.

Buffer was inducted into the International Sports Hall of Fame in 2024.

== Early life and martial arts background ==
Buffer first ventured into martial arts when he was thirteen years old and living in Philadelphia, Pennsylvania, studying judo and achieving the rank of green belt. He moved to Malibu, California, with his family at the age of fifteen and befriended two of the students of Chuck Norris, who introduced him to Tang Soo Do, in which he holds a second degree black belt. He began kickboxing in his twenties, but was forced to give up the sport at 32 after suffering his second concussion.

== UFC announcing ==
In 1996, Buffer announced the preliminary fight on UFC 8, and later hosted all fights at UFC 10. In 1997 he appeared as himself on the Season 3 Episode 24 of the Friends sitcom, "The One with the Ultimate Fighting Champion". At the stage he convinced UFC owner Bob Meyrowitz to hire him as the full-time ring announcer, starting with UFC 13.

Buffer uses catch phrases in his UFC announcing, and also has a signature move called the "Buffer 180", in which he motions directly across the Octagon before quickly spinning 180° and pointing to the corner being introduced. Buffer performs 45° and 90° turns before most "Buffer 180s", but reserves the "Buffer 180" for main events and co-main events. At UFC 100, after months of encouragement from Joe Rogan, Buffer performed a "Buffer 360" during his introduction of Frank Mir vs. Brock Lesnar. He also performed the "Buffer Bow" exclusively for Randy Couture and Anderson Silva, bending down as a knight would to a king in the accolade.

== Notable appearances outside UFC ==
Buffer has announced many other MMA promotions internationally including K-1 events and also the 2008 Joel Casamayor vs. Michael Katsidis boxing event on HBO. He also announces for the biannual ADCC (Abu Dhabi Combat Club) submission wrestling tournament.

Buffer is a world-rated poker player on the professional circuit. He has appeared on NSUS Group's World Series of Poker Main Event show playing World Champion Chris Moneymaker at the televised table in 2007 and in 2005 made the Final Table of the World Poker Tour in the Season 3 Invitational at the Commerce Casino, where he placed 6th. He appeared on an MMA versus poker pro match during the sixth season of the NBC show Poker After Dark along with Strikeforce Fighter Dan Henderson and UFC Fighter Randy Couture. Buffer outlasted them as well as pros Erick Lindgren and Patrik Antonius to finish second, losing in heads-up play to Howard Lederer. At the World Series of Poker 2010 main event final table, he was given the honor of starting the final table with the poker phrase "Shuffle up and deal!" As of September 2010, the Luxor Las Vegas has named their poker room after Buffer.

In 2007 he appeared on the HBO comedy-drama series Entourage, in the episode entitled "Gotcha!", announcing an exhibition fight for Chuck Liddell's charity. On March 20, 2012, he was featured on the Comedy Central show Tosh.0. In 2012, Buffer made a cameo appearance as himself in Here Comes the Boom, starring Kevin James, Salma Hayek, Henry Winkler and Joe Rogan. He appeared as the UFC ring announcer, introducing the bout between James's character, Scott Voss, and UFC fighter Ken Dietrich, played by Krzysztof Soszynski. Buffer appeared as himself in the 2015 film Hot Tub Time Machine 2. He also appeared as one of the fight fans alongside his brother Michael in the 2018 mystery comedy film Holmes & Watson.

He is also the official announcer for the World Series of Beer Pong.

He was featured as an announcer pack in the multiplayer online battle arena game Smite and class-based first person shooter game Paladins both published by Hi-Rez Studios. He is also an unlockable player character in the fighting game EA Sports UFC 3.

He provided announcing for the UFC-inspired song "It's Time" by American and Dutch DJs Steve Aoki and Laidback Luke.

In October 2019 the gaming developer Relax Gaming released a new video slot machine with Buffer called "It's Time". The slot was developed with Buffer and the same company had earlier made a slot game with his older brother, Michael Buffer.

In the 13th episode of Hell's Kitchen season 19, Buffer made an appearance during the episode's challenge.

Buffer is the official announcer for the PlayStation 5 exclusive videogame Destruction AllStars, which was developed by Lucid Games and released in February 2021.

On September 13, 2021, Buffer announced for ESPN's Monday Night Football matchup, where the Las Vegas Raiders hosted the Baltimore Ravens at Allegiant Stadium.

In July 2022, Buffer appeared in the stand-up comedy special "Infamous" as he introduced comedian Andrew Schulz.

In fall of 2022, Buffer appeared in ads for Canadian mortgage brokerage Dominion Lending Centres.

In November 2023, Buffer appeared in the Las Vegas Grand Prix of the 2023 Formula One World Championship and made a meme moment while introducing the Red Bull Racing driver Sergio Perez.

On June 8, 2026, Buffer introduced the starting lineup for MLB's Athletics, prior to the first game of their "Las Vegas Series" against the Milwaukee Brewers, planned to preview their (widely controversial) move to the region by 2028.

On July 19 2026, Buffer was the official announcer for the 2026 FIFA World Cup Final.

== Personal life ==
In 1989, Buffer was introduced to his half-brother, Michael Buffer, when their birth father contacted Michael after seeing him on television. In the mid-1990s, Bruce became Michael's agent/manager. The pair later formed a company, The Buffer Partnership TBP, and expanded their business via licensing and appearances.
