= Kastenlauf =

Drinking game

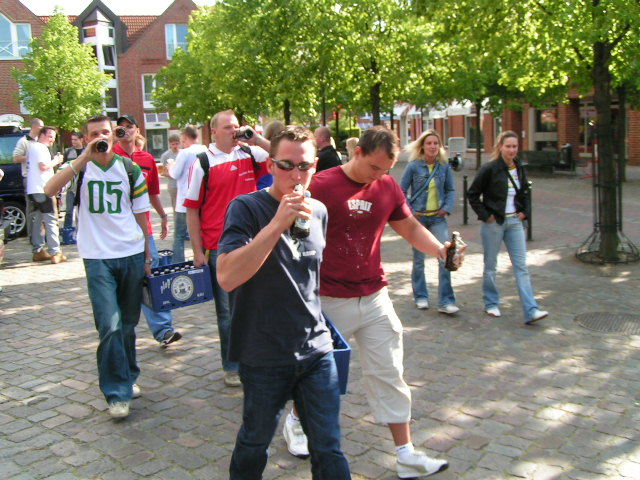
Kastenlauf participants in Harrislee

Kastenlauf (literally beer crate-running), or Bier-Rallye, is a drinking game that is played in Austria, Germany and Switzerland. It is a race among teams that consist of at least two people carrying a crate of beer, the contents of which must be consumed prior to crossing the finish line. The first team to cross the finish line after consuming all their beer is considered the winner. The teams are usually also required to retain all their bottle caps, as an anti-littering measure.

The route generally varies from 5 to 12 kilometres (3.1 to 7.5 mi) in length.

In Munich, kastenlauf events have been organized since 1982. Kastenlaufs are also common among young people while en route to a beer festival, especially on its first day. As no application was submitted for the Harassenlauf in 2010, the canton of Baselland and the municipality of Münchenstein declared the event illegal. As the initiators and fans called for participation on internet forums and social media, the police responded with a large contingent. Around 400 police officers confronted around 200 Harassenlauf runners. Apart from minor provocations and skirmishes, the confrontation between the law enforcement officers and the mostly young participants was peaceful.
