= Beer mile world championship =

Defunct annual beer mile competition

- Date: December 17, 2016
- Location: Austin, Texas
- Event type: beer mile
- Distance: mile
- Established: 2014
- Course records: 4:47:13 by Lewis Kent

The Beer Mile World Championship is an annual beer mile competition to determine a champion in the running of a beer mile.

From 2014 to 2016, Flotrack, a running-focused media company, hosted a championship in Austin, Texas, but stopped after the third edition of the event. In 2015, a competing world championship known as the Beer Mile World Classic was held in San Francisco. The World Classic has been held in different cities around the world each year ever since.

== Race Details ==
The event originated in Downtown Austin at the Austin American Statesman headquarters. Originally scheduled for Yellow Jacket Stadium in Austin, community leaders grew concerned, and the venue for the first race was moved to Circuit of the Americas, where a makeshift quarter mile oval on the pit straight was formed for the inaugural race. In 2014, the winners of the men's and women's elite fields received $5,000.

In 2015 and 2016, the event was held in Downtown Austin.

== History ==
=== 2014 ===
In 2014, the inaugural Beer Mile World Championship was held in Austin, Texas. The men's race was won by Canadian Corey Gallagher with a time of 5:00.23. In the women's race, American Beth Herndon set a new world record with a time of 6:17.8.

=== 2015 ===
The 2015 race featured a loaded field including defending champion Corey Gallagher, Lewis Kent, and Jim Finlayson. Australian Josh Harris became the second man to break the 5 minute barrier. The record lasted less than 12 hours, as later on, Lewis Kent of Canada narrowly edged Gallagher by 2 seconds with a time of 4:55.78. On August 12, the last four world record holders competed against each other for the first time. Canadian Jim Finlayson, another former world record holder, finished third. In the women's field, American Erin O'Mara lowered the women's world record to 6:07.

The records set at the 2015 race are the subject of controversy, as the course used was allegedly too short, inaccurately measured, and the chug zone, at nearly 20 meters, was longer than the current standard. The long chug zone allowed athletes to cover more ground walking through the zone, effectively shortening the race.

Also in 2015, the first Beer Mile World Classic was held in San Francisco. It included an international team competition, in which James Nielsen was disqualified for excessive spillage. Nielsen's disqualification was the deciding factor in the Canadian men's victory, turning the 10–11 American victory into a 10–11 Canadian win. The American women won the Queens cup, with Caitlin Judd, Chris Kimbrough and Lindsay Harper taking the top 3 spots. The 2nd Annual FloTrack Beer Mile World Championship was held in Austin, Texas on December 1, 2015. Kent set a new world record with a time of 4:47.17 and Gallagher finished with a time of 4:48.62.

=== 2016 ===
On July 31, 2016, at the World Beer Mile Classic in London, Canadian Corey Bellemore broke the world record with a time of 4:34.35. Dale Clutterbuck finished second, breaking the European record with a time of 4:47:39 and Lewis Kent finished fourth in 5:11. Canada won the men's team champion, and the North American women beat the European English team for the Queen's cup. The women's race was won by Erin O'Mara, with the British and European record going to Polly Keen of England.

=== 2017 ===
The third annual World Beer Mile Classic was held again in London in 2017, with the American men winning the first three positions to take home the Kingston Cup. All three American men were current or former American record holders, with Chris Robertson winning over Dale Clutterbuck. Garrett Cullen earned the silver, and Brandon Shirk earned the bronze for the second straight year. Bryony Pearce was the winner, after Allison Grace Morgan and Laura Riche were disqualified, making England the winner of the Queens Cup.

On October 28, 2017, Corey Bellemore broke his own record in San Francisco with a time of 4:33.6 The event had the largest crowd for a beer mile with an estimated attendance of 6200. Bellemore's performance likely would have been faster, but he had to move out to lane 3 each lap due to soccer benches in the first 2 lanes.

=== 2018 ===
Dale Clutterbuck was the official winner with a time of 4:50. Three runners were disqualified, including the previous year's winner Corey Bellemore, after race officials measured the remaining liquid in the cans and bottles of the 20 competitors. According to Patrick Butler of Beermile.com, four US fl oz (120 ml) is the maximum amount allowed left over. Bellemore was disqualified for one-half US fl oz (15 ml) more than the permitted amount.

=== 2023 ===
On July 1, 2023, Shelby Houlihan, a professional middle-distance runner who was given a 4-year ban by the Athletics Integrity Unit in 2021, returned to racing in her first Beer Mile World Classic. She became the first woman to finish in under 6 minutes, running 5:43.81. Houlihan currently holds the American record in the 1500m, which she set in 2019.
