= Beer mile =

Race combining running and speed drinking

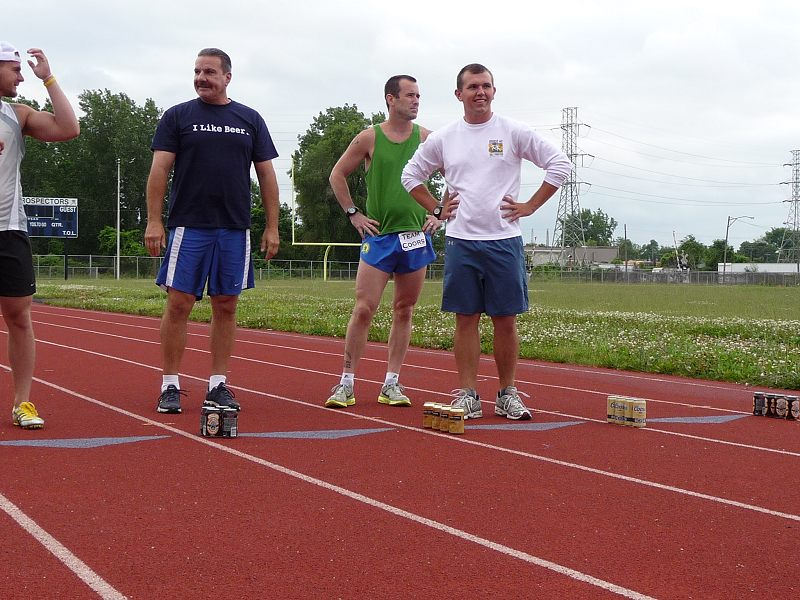
Beer mile competitors at the starting line

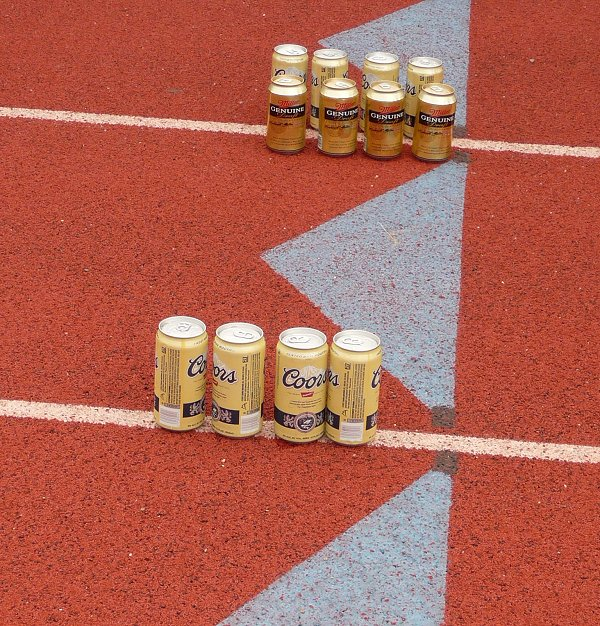
Competitors drink one can of beer before each of four laps of the 400 m track

A beer mile is a 1-mile (1.6 km) drinking race combining running and speed drinking. Typically, the race takes place on a standard 400-metre or 1/4-mile running track. The race begins at the 1-mile starting line with the consumption of a 12-US-fluid-ounce (355 ml) beer, followed by a full lap around the track. The next three laps continue in a similar manner: another 12-ounce beer is consumed before commencing the running of each lap. Following the completion of the fourth running lap (and four beers), a competitor has finished the race.

In North America, 12 US ounces of beer are consumed from a can or bottle before every lap. A set of rules has been defined and published by BeerMile.com.

The world record holder is Canadian Corey Bellemore with a time of 4:27 set in Lisbon in 2025. He set the record two previous times by running 4:33.6 in San Francisco in 2017 and when he ran 4:28.1 to win his third world title on October 23, 2021.

Shelby Houlihan broke the women's beer mile record in 2023 with a time of 5:43.81, becoming the first woman to break six minutes.

== History ==
In 1997, Seanna Robinson, a resident of Toronto, set the female beer mile record at an event held in Hamilton, Ontario. Her time of 6:42.0 stood as the women's world record until 2014, when Chris Kimbrough, a 44-year-old mother of six, ran the beer mile in 6:28.6.

James Nielsen was the first participant to break the five-minute barrier in 2014. Since then, the record has been lowered a handful of times by runners from all over the world.

In 2014, the inaugural Beer Mile World Championship was held in Austin, Texas. The men's race was won by Canadian Corey Gallagher with a time of 5:00.23. In the women's race, American Beth Herndon set a new world record with a time of 6:17.8.

== International races ==
Beyond the Beer Mile World Championship's original run in Austin, a rival Beer Mile World Classic launched in San Francisco in 2015 and has since rotated among cities on multiple continents, including London (twice), Manchester, Leuven, and Berlin.At the 2016 London edition, Dale Clutterbuck set a European record of 4:47.39, and England's Polly Keen set a European women's record, while Canada and the North American women's team took the team titles over British and European entrants.By 2018, national teams from the United States, Canada, the United Kingdom, Sweden, and Australia were competing for country titles at the World Classic. In Britain, national newspapers have reported on domestic athletes training specifically for the Beer Mile Classic. In Norway, national broadcaster NRK1 aired a segment in October 2020 following two Norwegian competitors to the World Classic in Berlin; a Norwegian national beer-mile championship was subsequently established.

== Defunct race series ==
Two national race series emerged and quickly folded, the Brew Mile and the National Beer Mile. By the end of 2016, neither race series was solvent, with the National Beer Mile closing operations under dubious circumstances.

== Other races involving alcohol ==
=== Kastenlauf ===
Kastenlauf (short for "Bierkastenlauf", literally "beer crate running"), Kistenlauf, Bierlauf, Bierkastenrennen (literally crate-running, beer crate-running, or equivalents), Bier-Rallye, or Bierathlon, is a drinking sport in the German-speaking countries Austria, Germany and Switzerland. It is a race among two-member teams carrying a crate of beer (equaling 10 liters), all of which must be consumed by each team prior to crossing the finish line. The route can be anywhere from 5 to 20 kilometres (3 to 12 mi) long.

=== Marathon du Médoc ===
The Marathon du Médoc, held in Bordeaux every September, is a marathon through the vineyards of Médoc during which competitors sample 23 different wines as they go. It has been described as "the world's longest, booziest, race" as well as the "world's most idiotic marathon".

== See also ==
- Beer pong
