= Marathon du Médoc =

French novelty marathon

Coordinates: 45.1999°N 0.7488°W

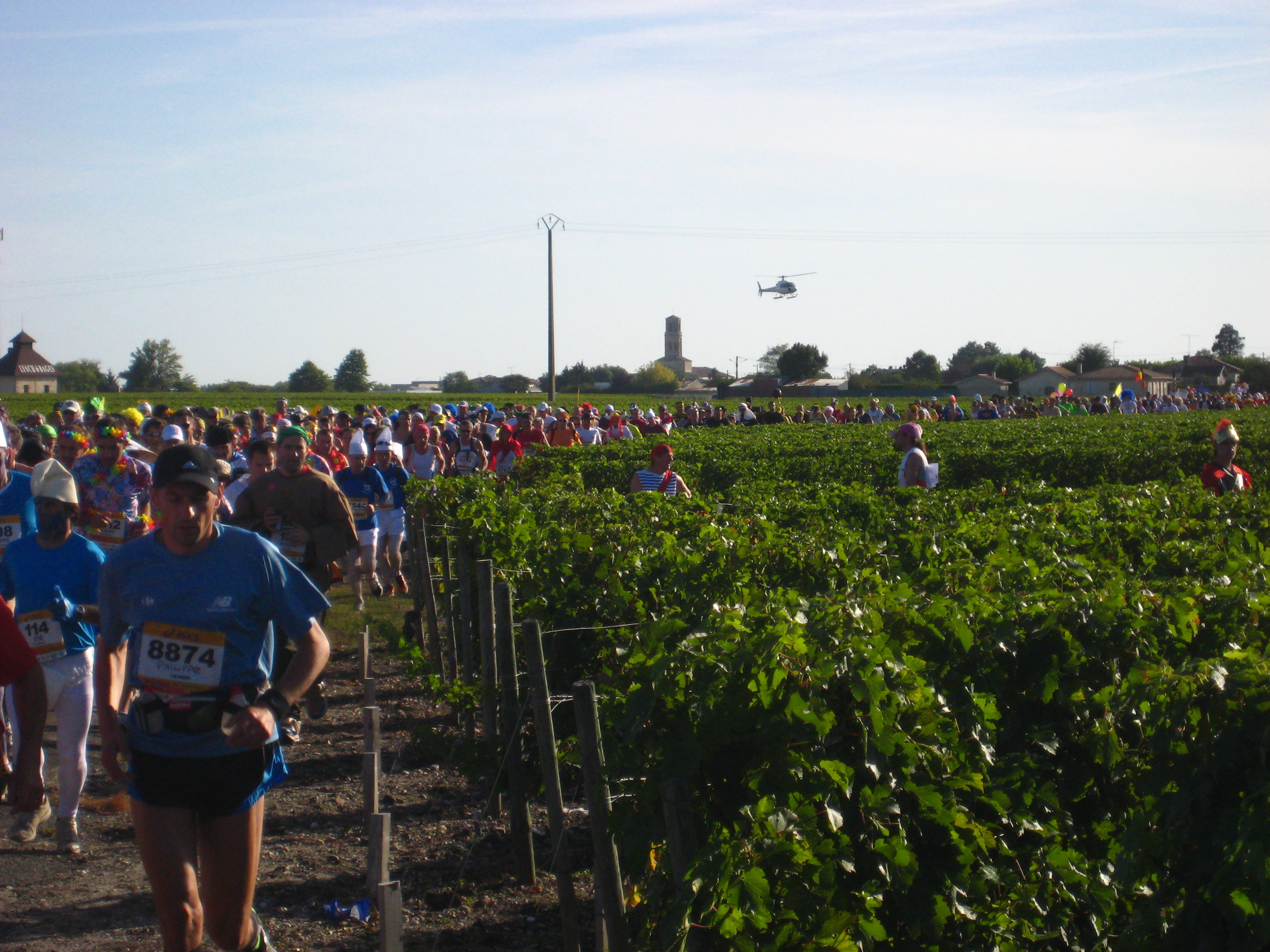
Marathon du Medoc runners

The Marathon du Médoc is a French marathon race, created in 1985, held every year in September through the vineyards of the Médoc in the Gironde. It is considered "the longest Marathon in the world" because the race is interspersed with several activities: musical breaks with 50 orchestras scattered around the course, 23 wine tasting stops, oyster tasting at the 38th kilometer, and steak at the 39th kilometer.

The Marathon du Médoc attracts around 8,500 participants, representing more than 50 nations, as well as many spectators. The marathon is organised by a volunteer association, with 2,800 volunteers.

A similar event is the Marathon des premières côtes de Blaye.

== Course ==
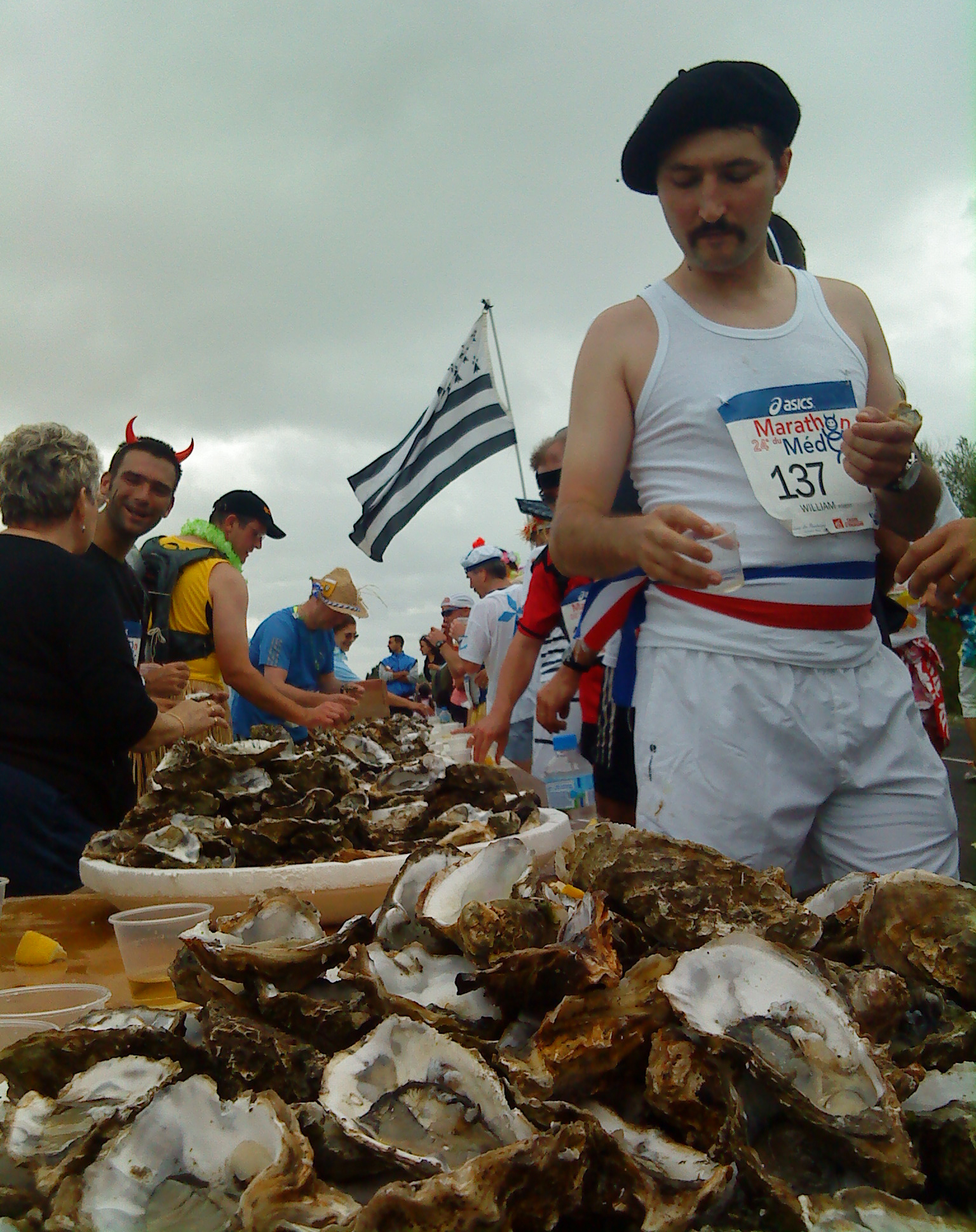
The oyster tasting stop at the 38th kilometer

The circuit crosses the vineyards and chateaux of Pauillac, Saint-Julien, Saint-Estèphe, Médoc and Haut-Médoc, beginning and ending in Pauillac. The marathon, known internationally, is famous for its festive atmosphere. 90% of marathon runners run in costume.

The course is officially 42.195 km long with the course record set by Sacha Lotov in 1992 (2'19’20”) and the women's record set by Josiane Llado in 1999 (2'38’34”).

== See also ==
- List of marathon races in Europe
- Long-distance race involving alcohol
- World Series of Beer Pong
