= Pull-off bottle cap =

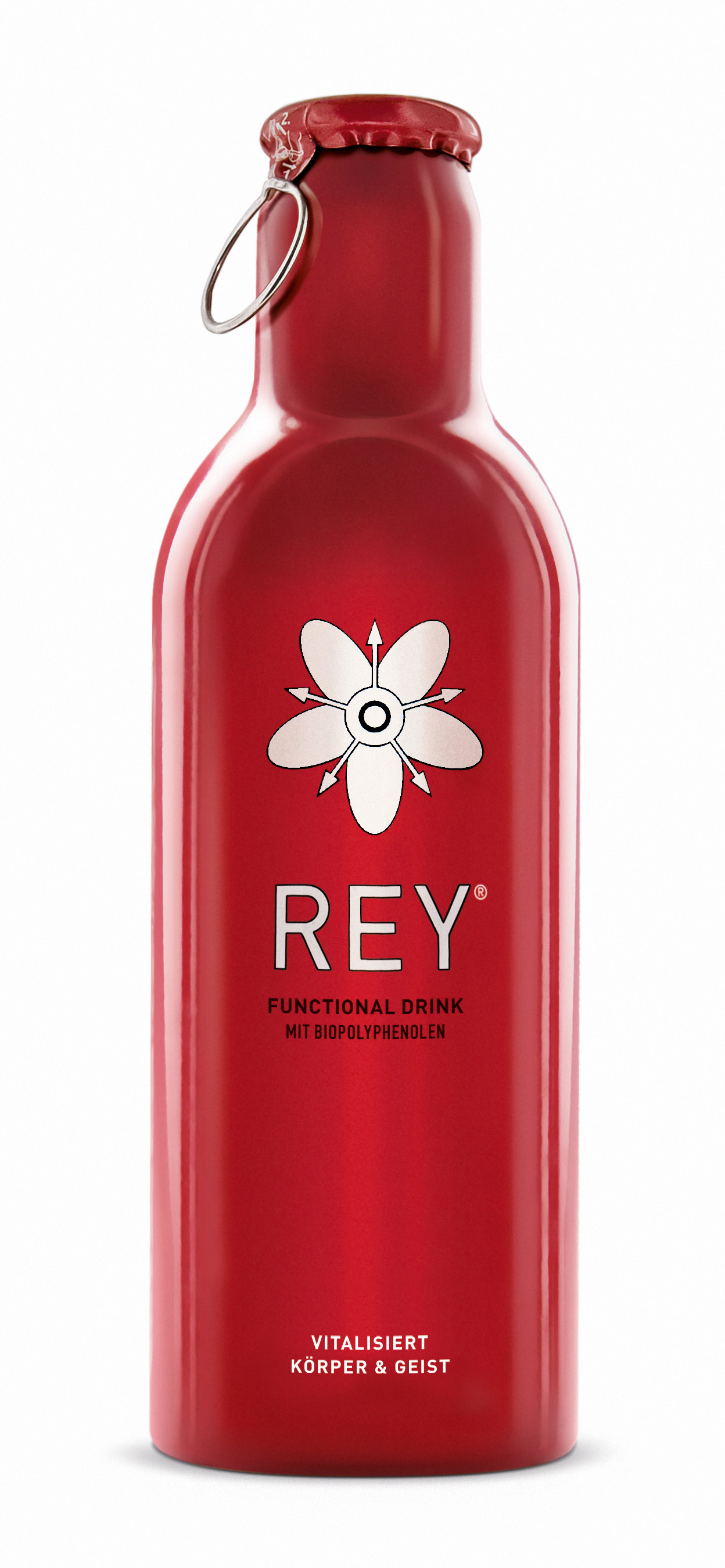
RingCrown closure on REY Functional Drink.

The pull-off bottle cap (also known as RingCrown, RipCap or Ring-pull closure or pull off caps) is a bottle closure that can be opened without any tools. It has a ring that can be pulled in order to detach the cap from the bottle. The cap splits along scores in the cap, therefore loosens and can be removed from the bottle. Drink companies use ring pull caps to differentiate themselves from competitors.

== History ==
ALKA, the predecessor of the modern ring-pull caps, was introduced during the 1930s. ALKA had a seal made of natural cork. It became popular in Nordic countries and Mediterranean countries as an easy-to-open cap. ALKA was made of aluminium and had a tab or twin tabs that were pulled to remove the cap. There was no scoring on an ALKA cap. Production of the ALKA cap took place on the bottling line.

== Patent ==
In 1974 AB Wicanders Korkfabriker of Sweden patented the MaxiCap. The MaxiCap was produced from 1979 at Wicanders’ factory in Hämeenlinna Finland, now known has Finn-Korkki Oy. A MaxiCap is an aluminium closure with scoring and a tab to pull. They were easier to use than the ALKA and pre-manufactured outside of the bottling plant. This allowed for increased production speeds on the bottling line.

Soon after the MaxiCap came the RingCrown closure. Invented in the early 1980s it was originally called MaxiCrown and later became known as RingCrown. The RingCrown is easier to use than its predecessors because it has an attached ring rather than a static pull off tab.

== Gallery ==
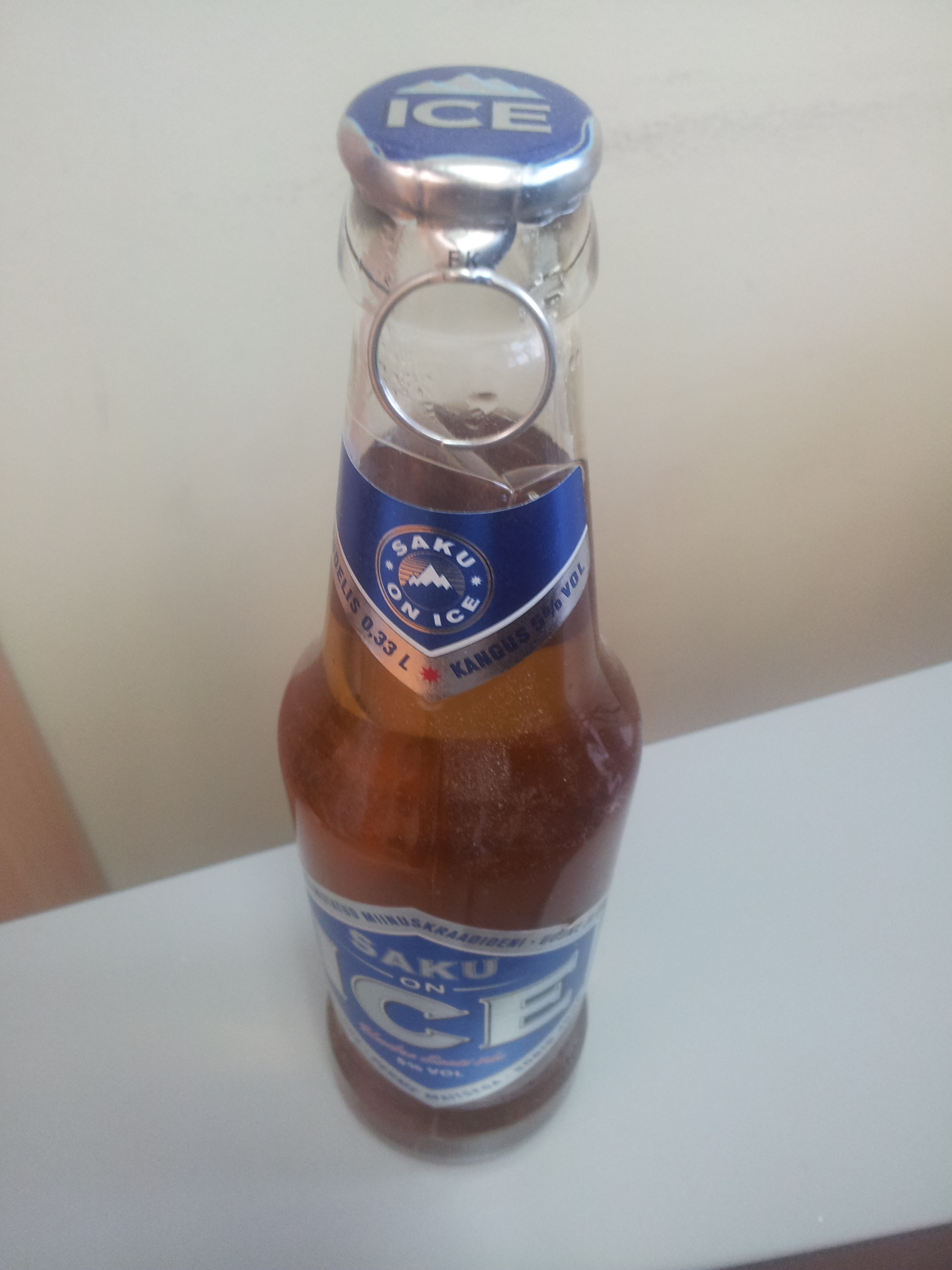
RingCrown closure on a beer bottle.

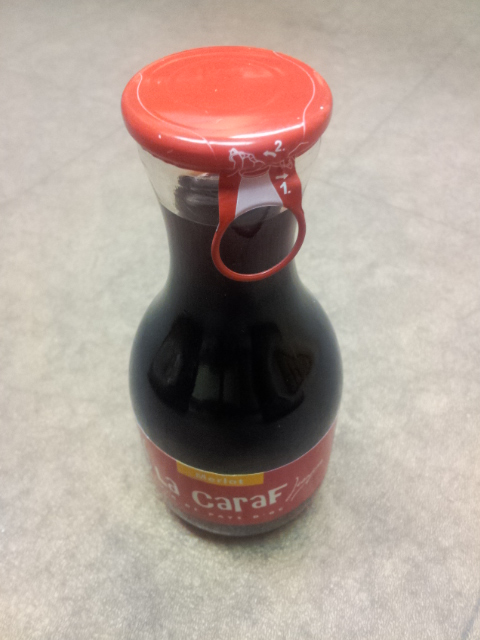
RipCap closure on a wine bottle.

== See also ==
- Codd-neck bottle
