= Bottle cap =

Closure that seals the top of a bottle

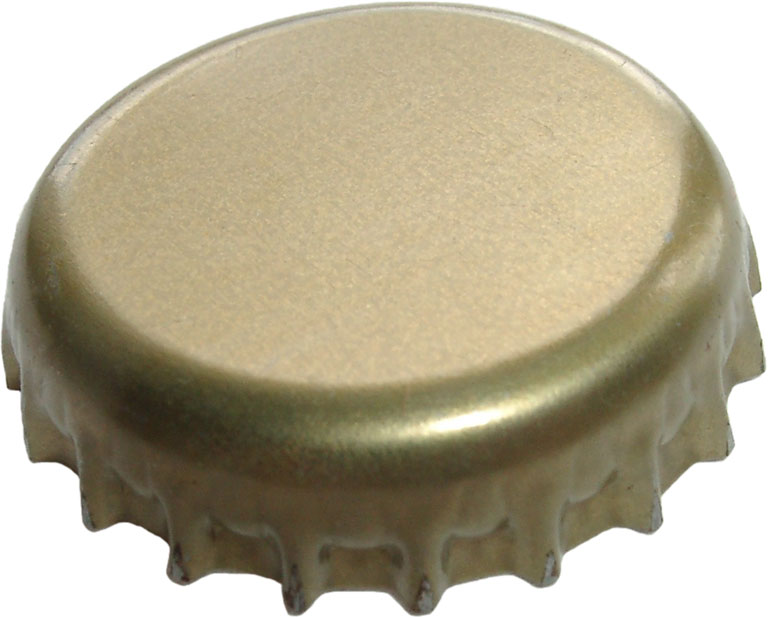
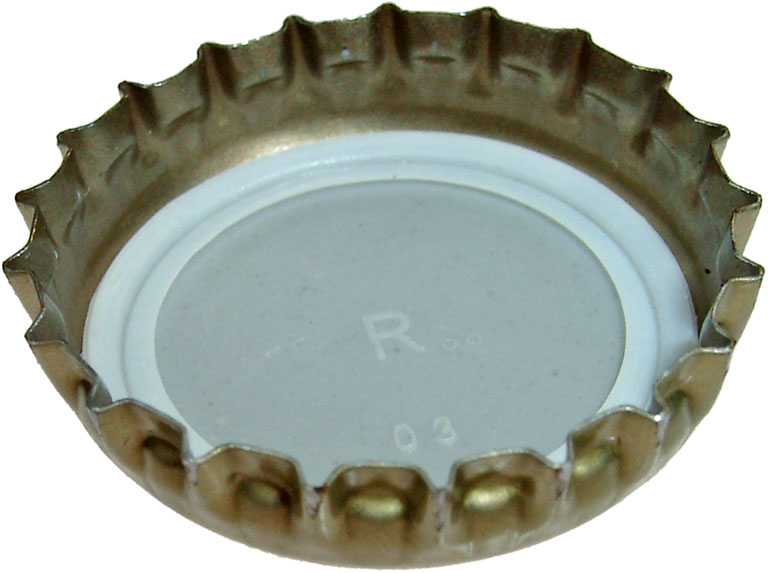
A generic 21-tooth crown cork bottle cap

A bottle cap or bottle top is a common closure for the top opening of a bottle. A cap is sometimes colorfully decorated with the logo of the brand of contents. Metal caps with plastic backing are used for glass bottles, sometimes wrapped in decorative foil. Metal caps are usually either steel or aluminum, and of the crown cork type. Flip-top caps (like flapper closures) preceded such caps.

Plastic caps are used for plastic bottles, functioning as screw caps, or plastic caps may have a pour spout rather than being detachable. Plastic caps are commonly made from polyethylene or polypropylene, and caps for plastic bottles are often made of a different type of plastic from the bottle.

A cork stopper is another type of closure for the top of a bottle.

== Types ==
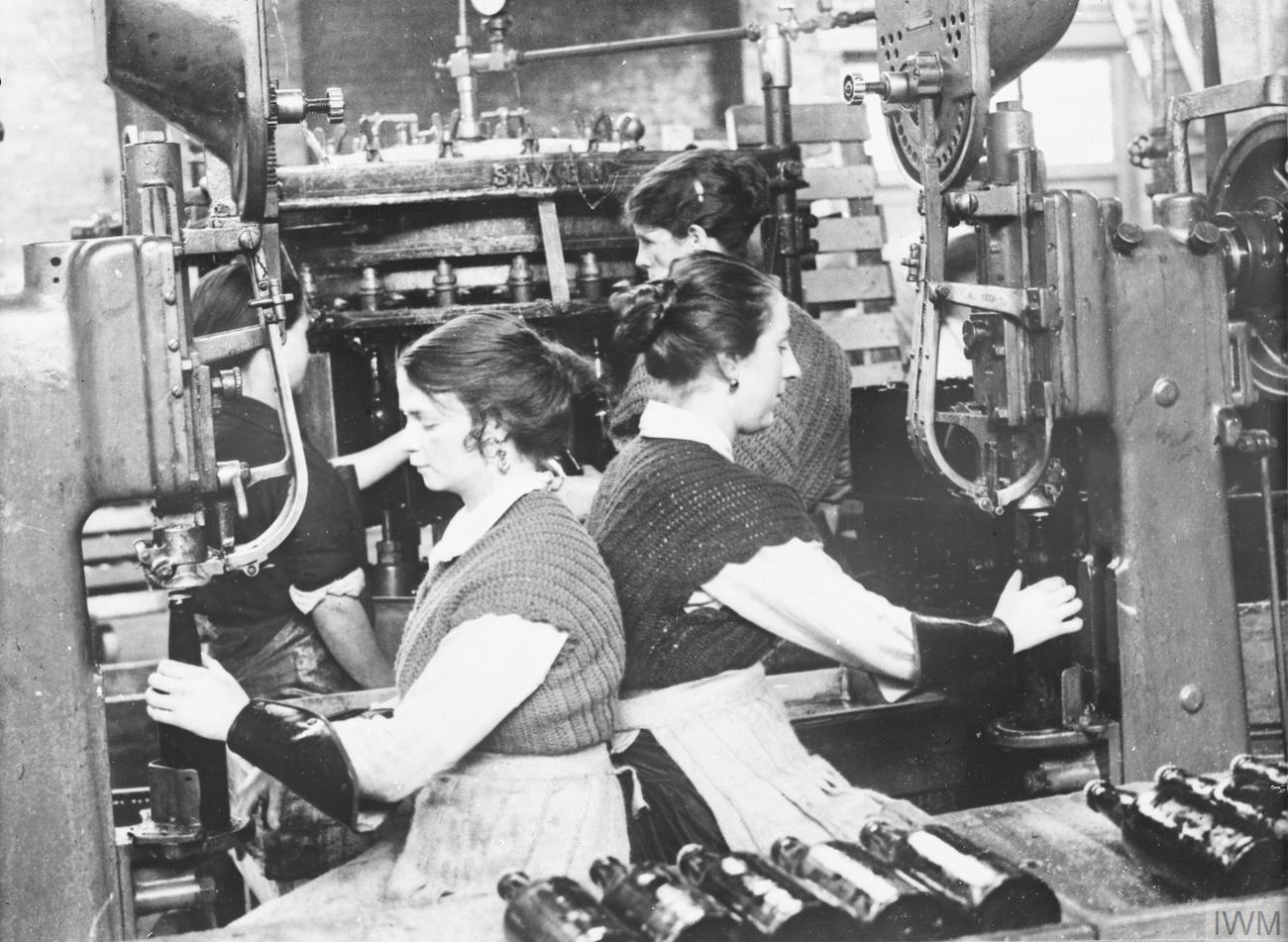
Workers in an English brewery applying crown corks to bottles (1918)

Caps were originally designed to be pressed over and around the top of a glass bottle to grab a small flange on the bottleneck.

=== Crown cork ===
The crown cork was patented by William Painter on February 2, 1892 (U.S. Patent 468,258). It had 24 teeth and a cork seal with a paper backing to prevent contact between the contents and the cork. The current version has 21 teeth. To open these bottles, a bottle opener is generally used.

The height of the crown cap was reduced and specified in the German standard DIN 6099 in the 1960s. This also defined the "twist-off" crown cap, now used in the United States, Canada, and Australia. This cap is pressed around screw threads instead of a flange and can be removed by twisting the cap by hand, eliminating the need for an opener.

=== Flip-top ===
The "flip-top", "swing-top" or "Grolsch" style consists of a plastic or ceramic stopper held in place by a set of wires. Prior to the invention of the crown cork, this was the dominant method of sealing bottles that contained carbonated liquid.

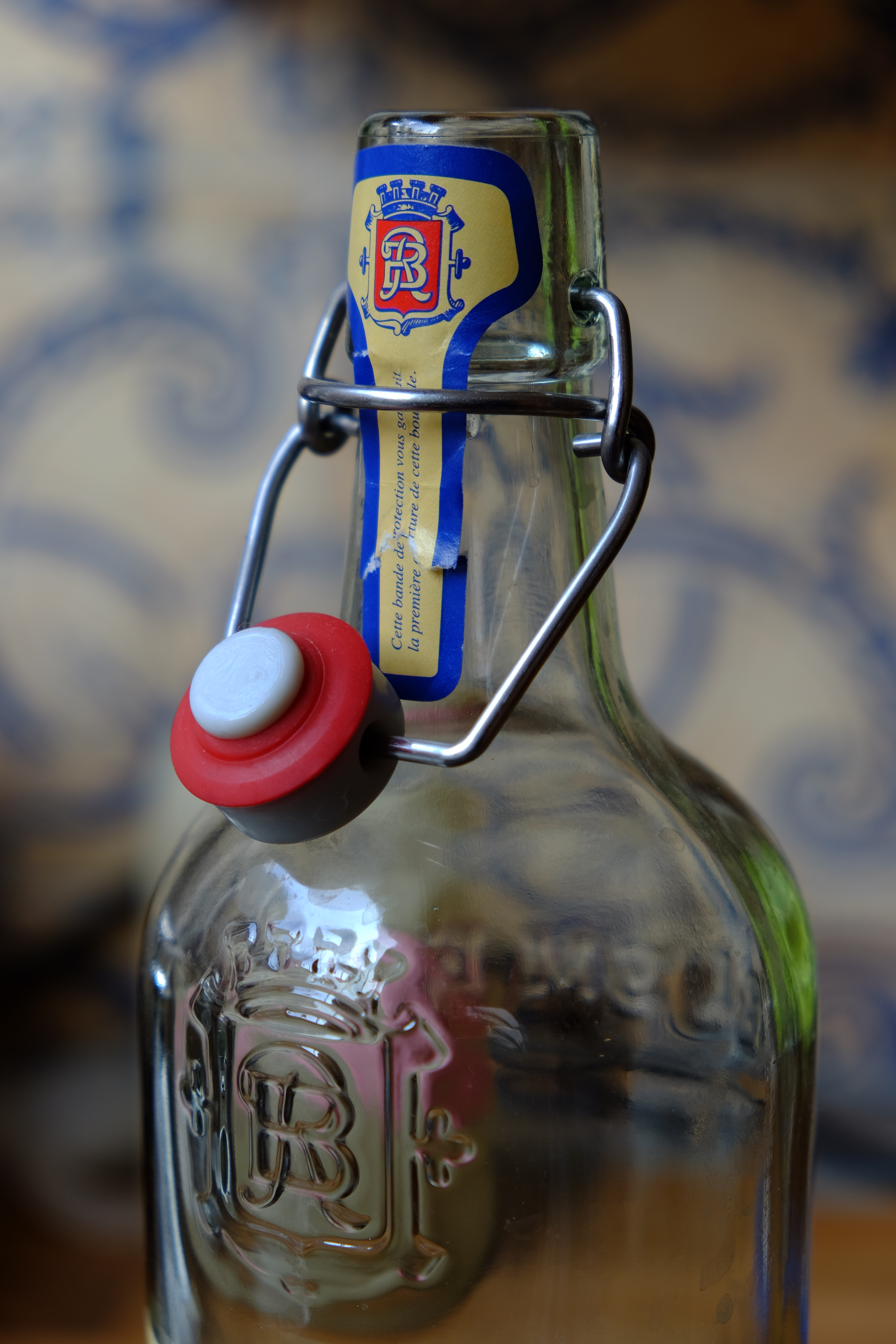
An opened "flip-top" bottle

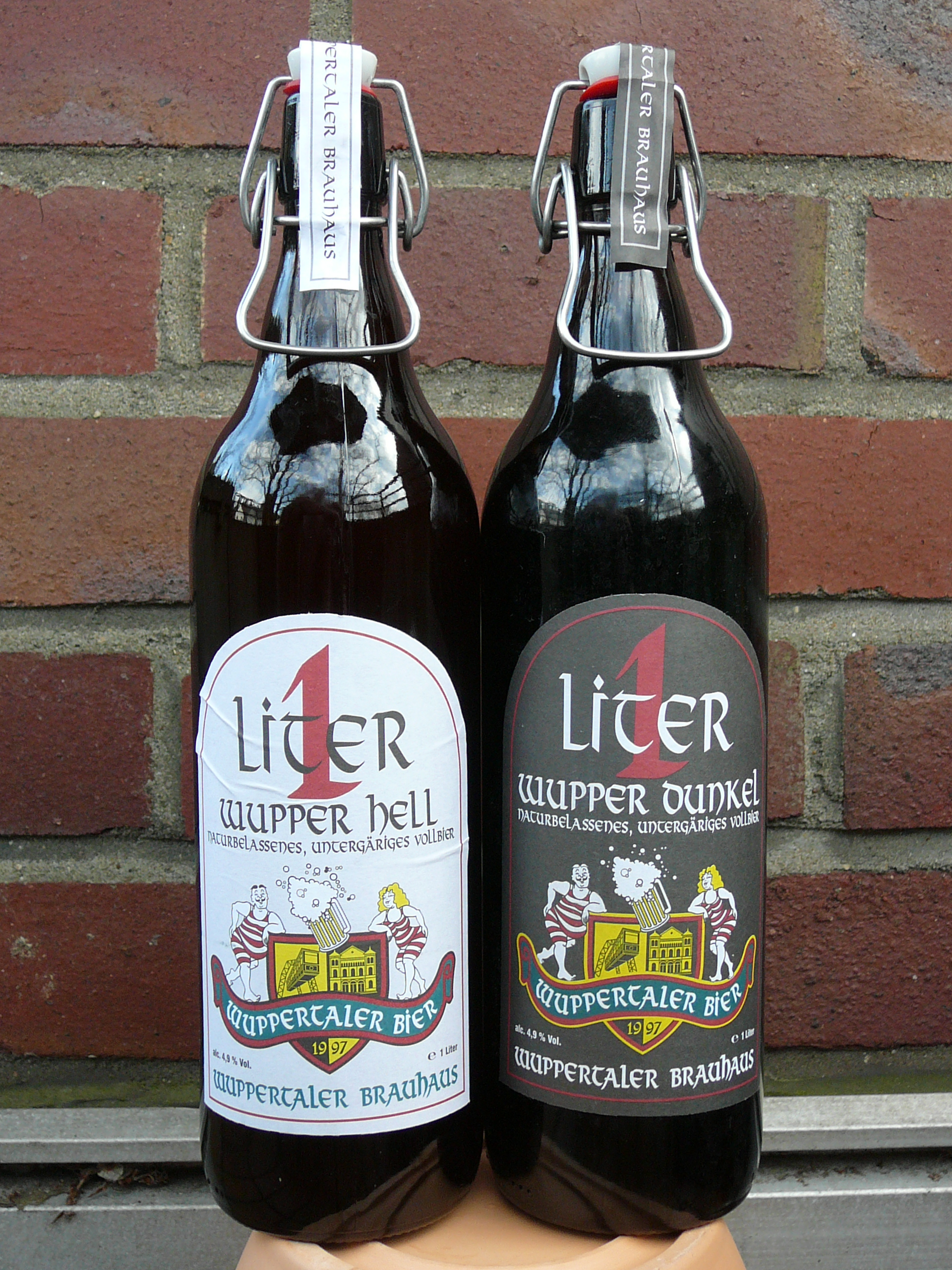
A pair of bottles with flip-top closures

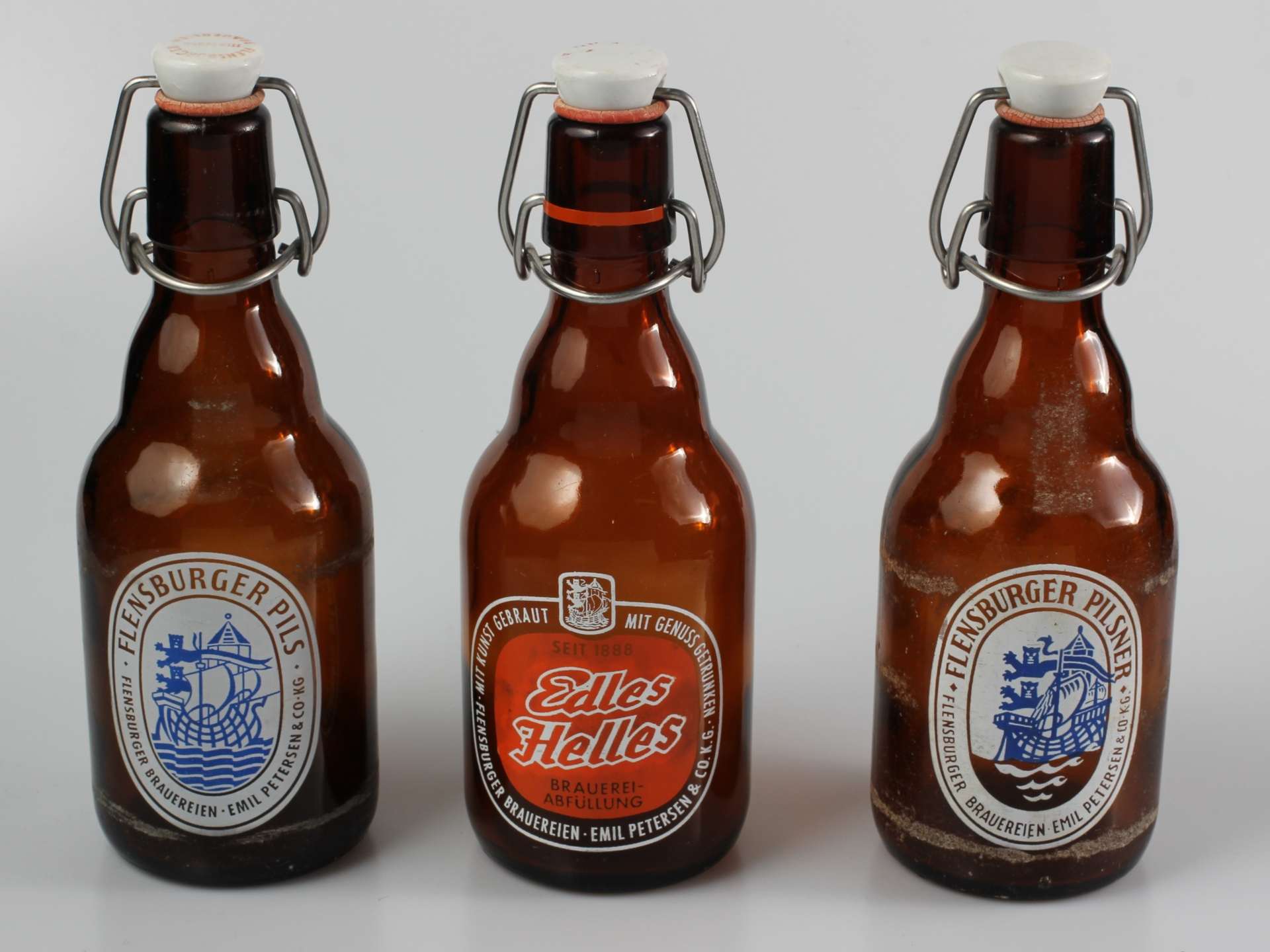

=== Other types ===
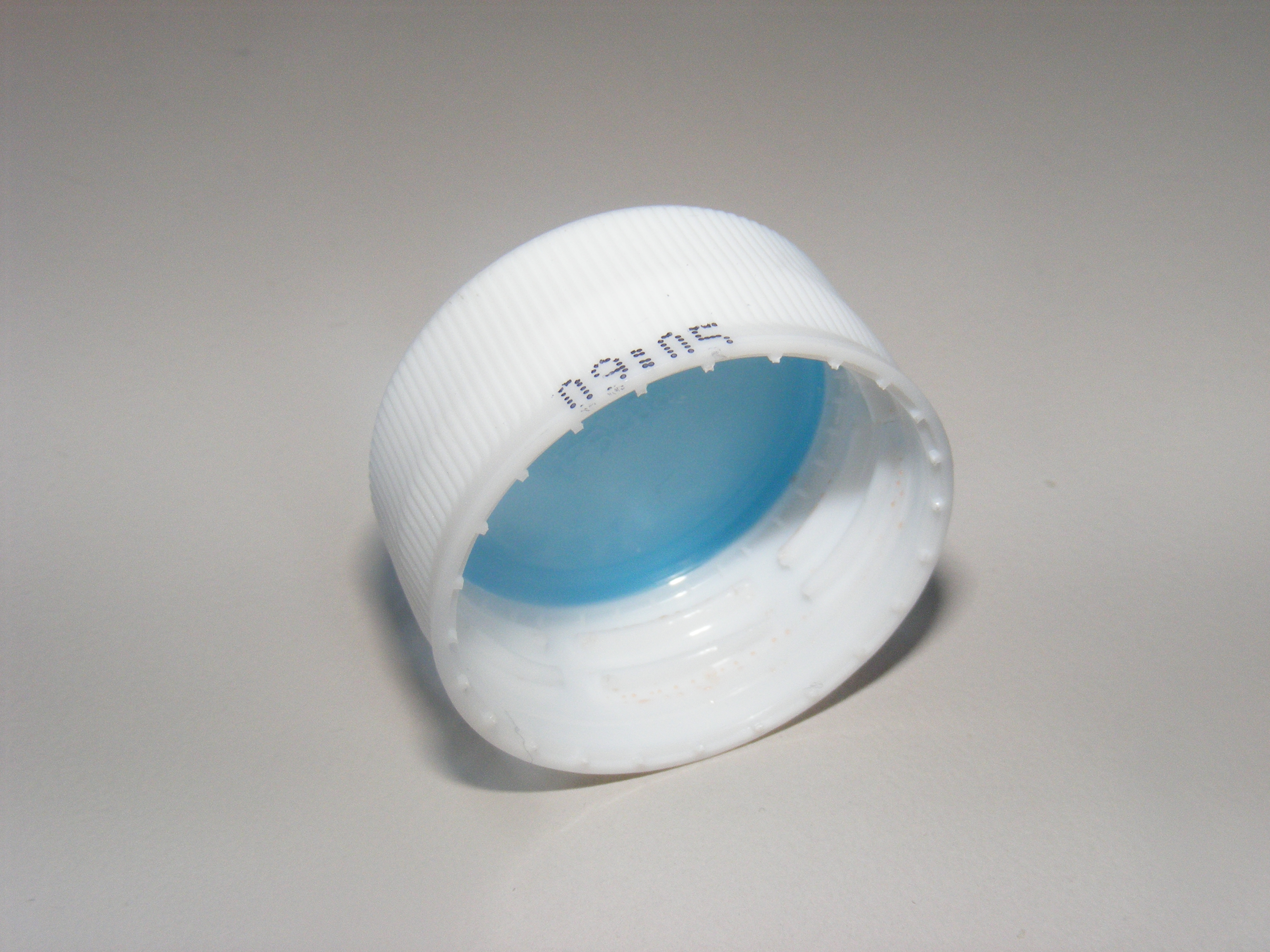
Plastic bottle screw cap used to seal a plastic bottle.

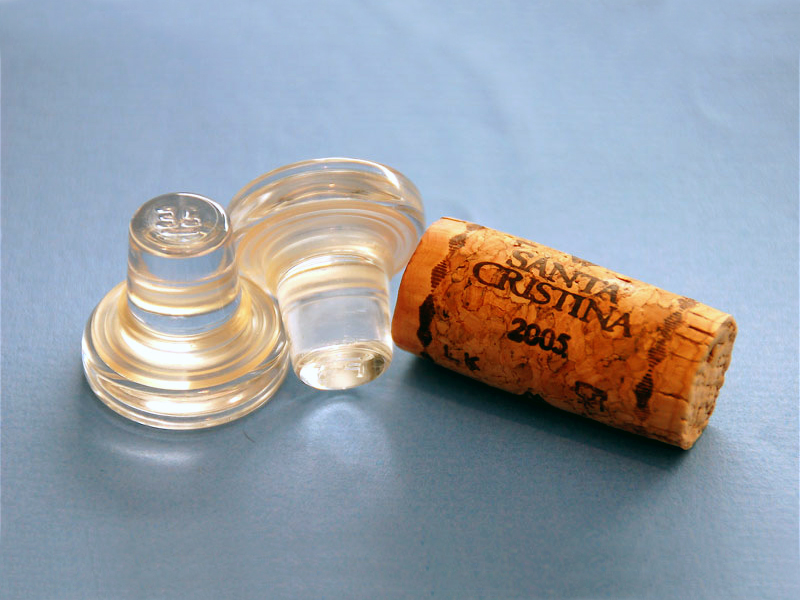
Glass stoppers for wine bottles and a cork stopper.

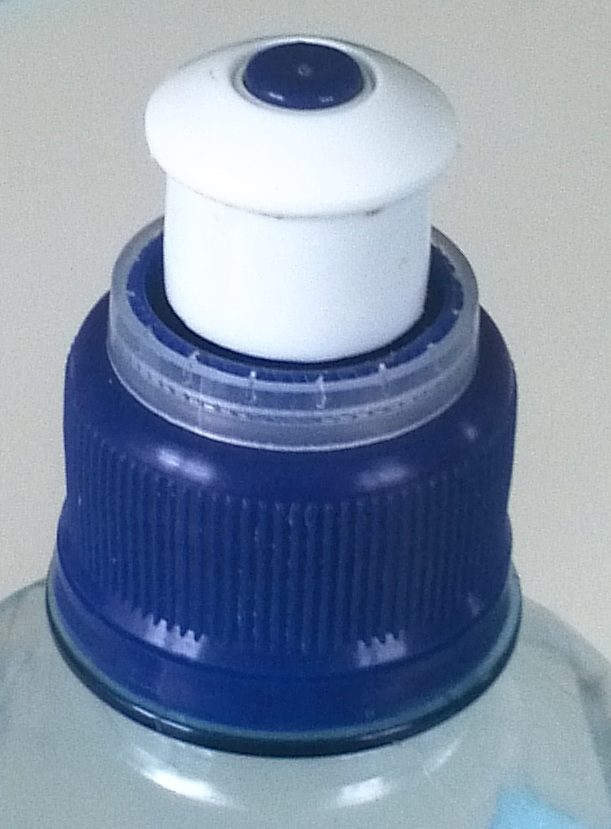
A "sports cap" made of plastic, as seen on many water bottles, here seen in closed configuration.

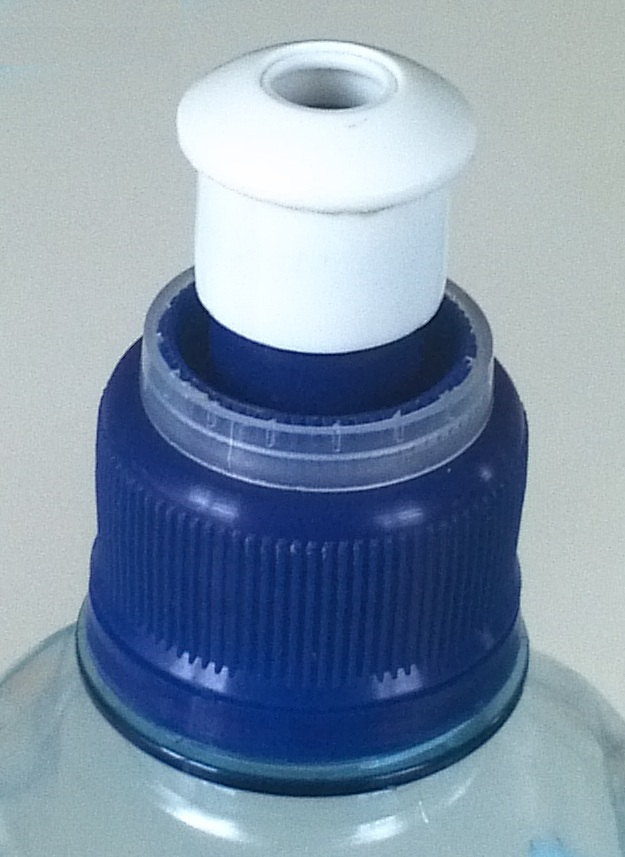
Same sports cap in open mode, allowing the liquid to pass around the central blue piece.

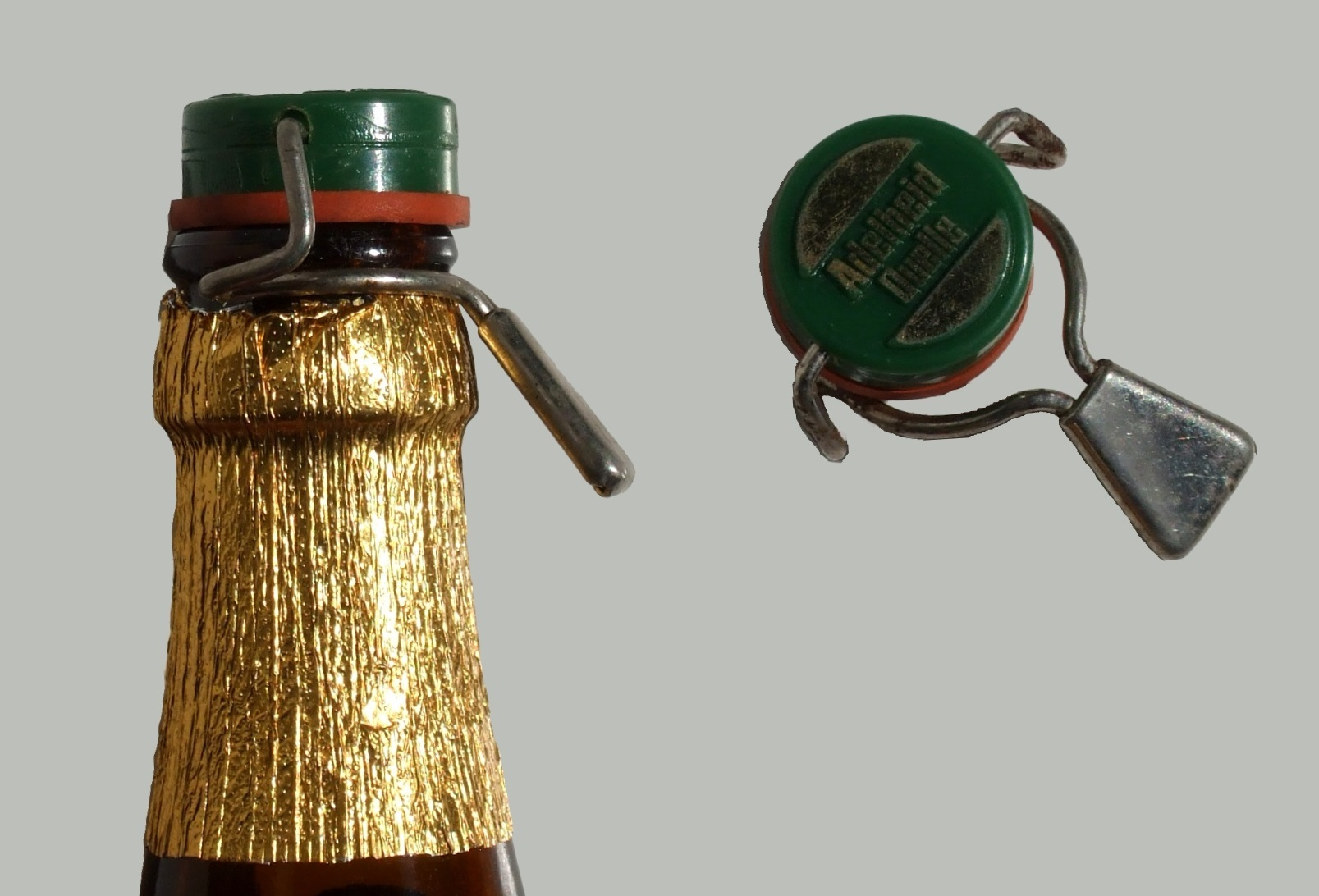
Bottle closer.

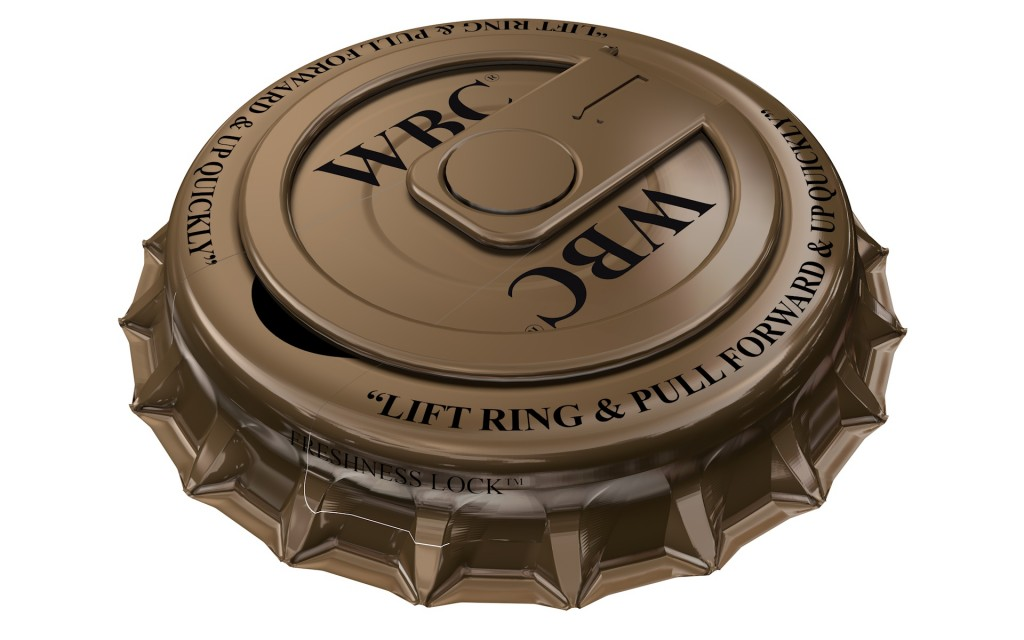
Easy Pull Bottle Cap

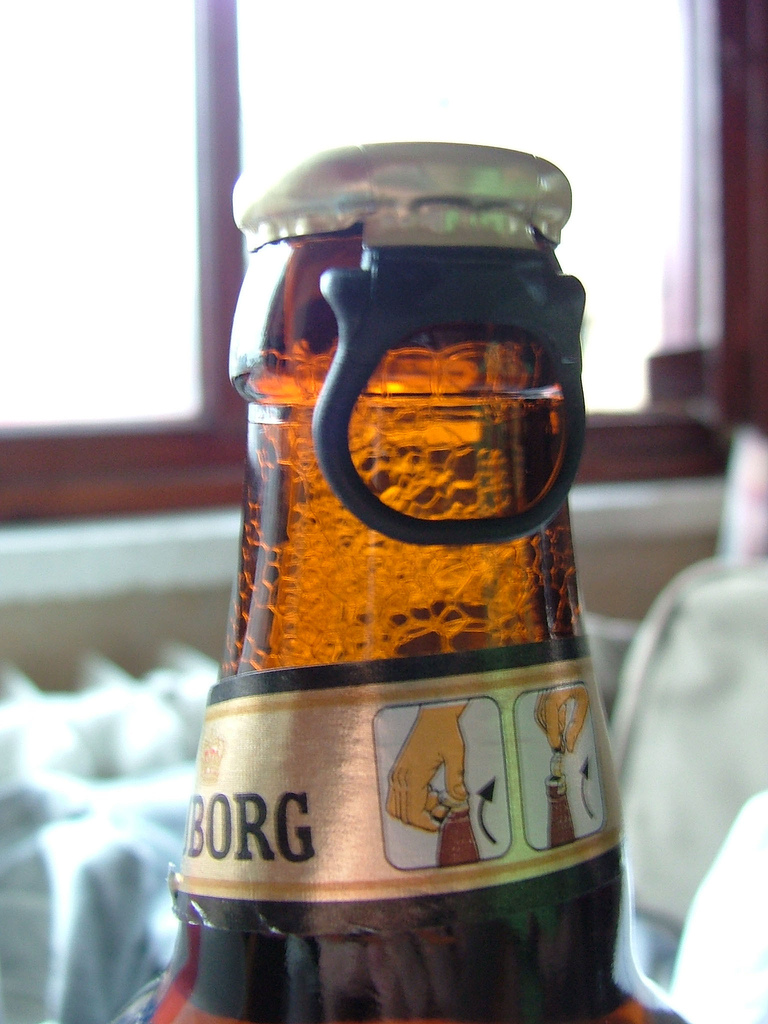
Pull-off bottle cap.

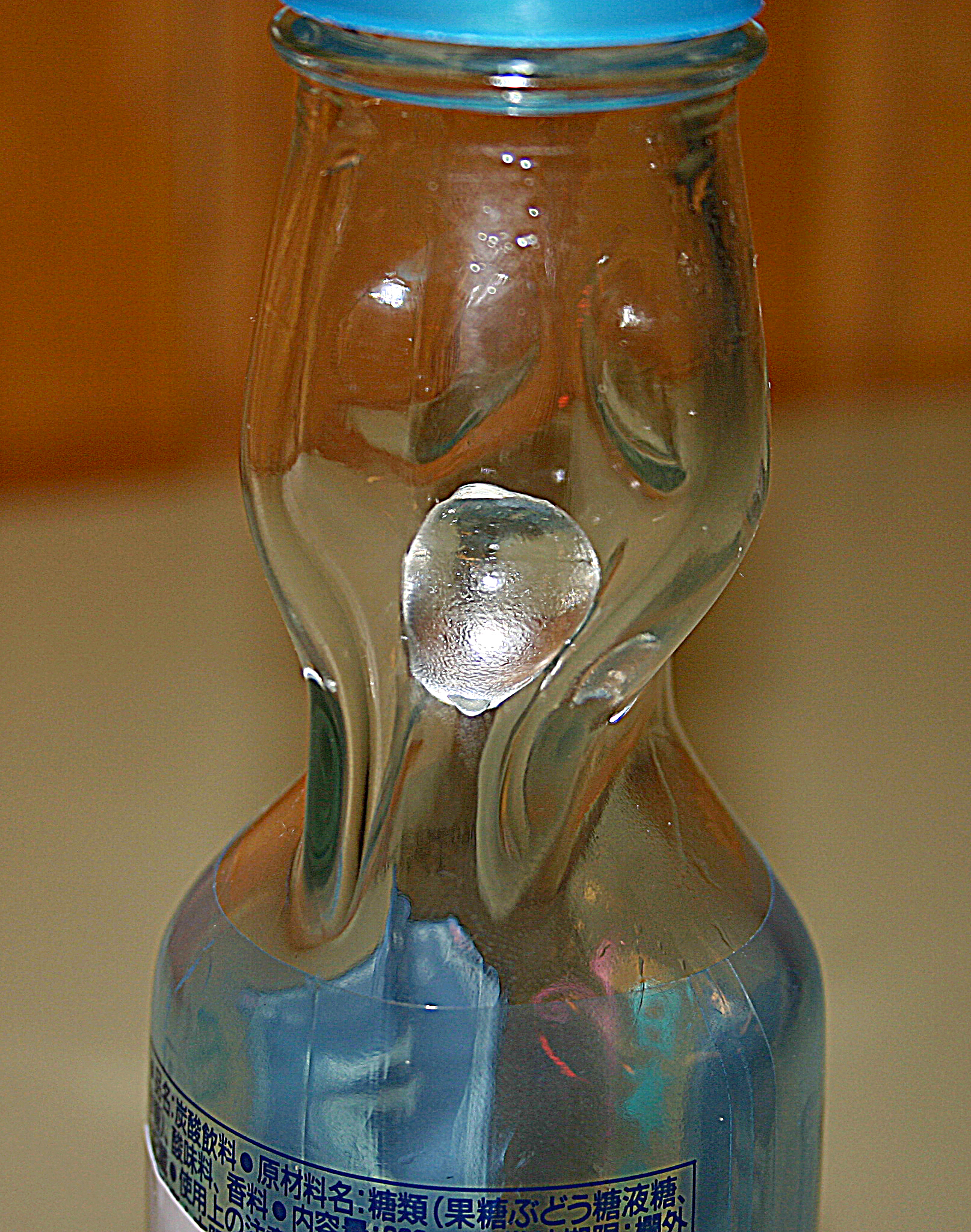
A Codd-neck bottle of Ramune, with the glass marble stopper inside its chamber after the bottle was opened

Smart bottle cap with function, inclued display water temperature and APP connect with smart phone.

=== Screw cap ===
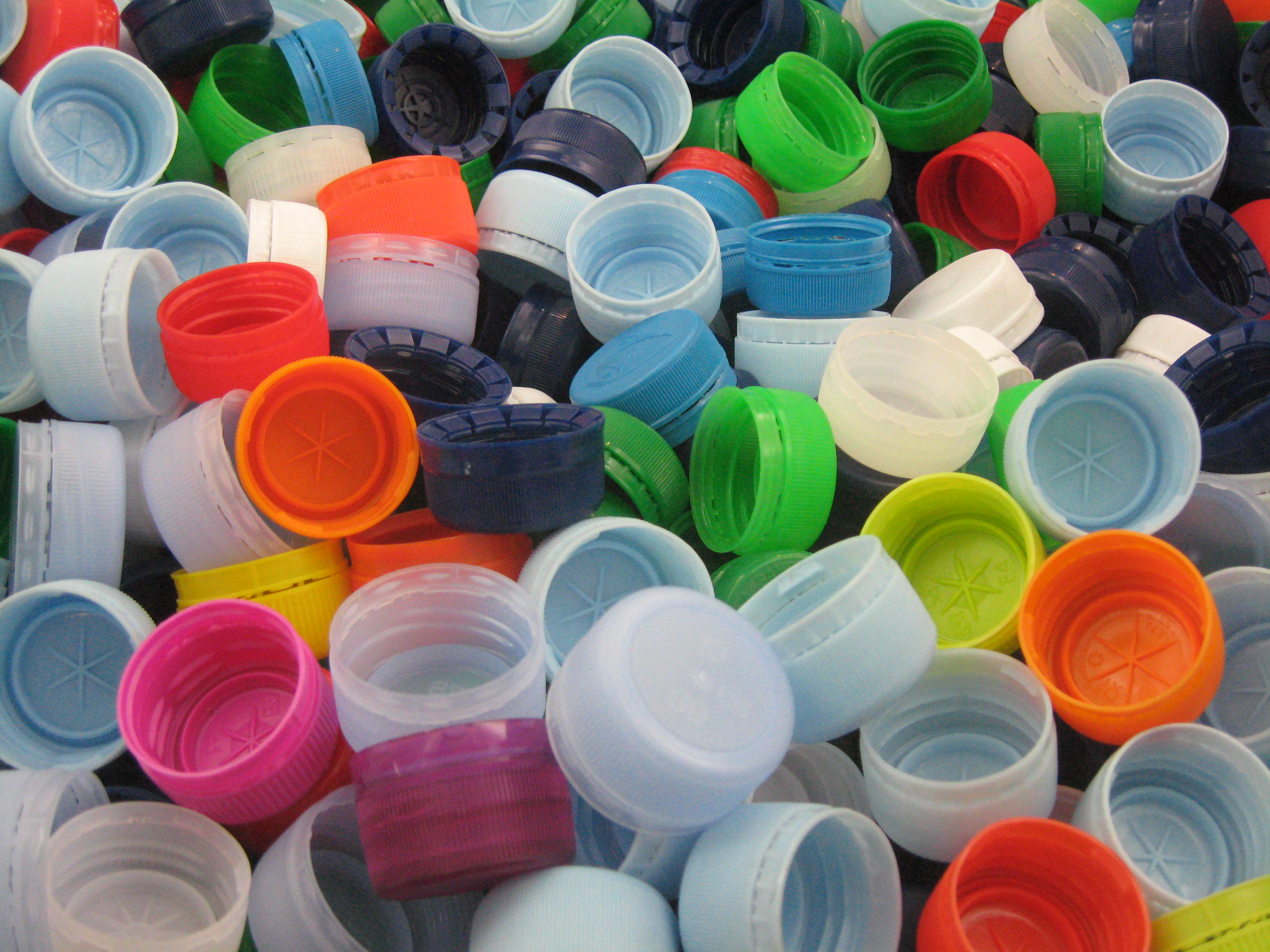
Plastic screw caps for bottles

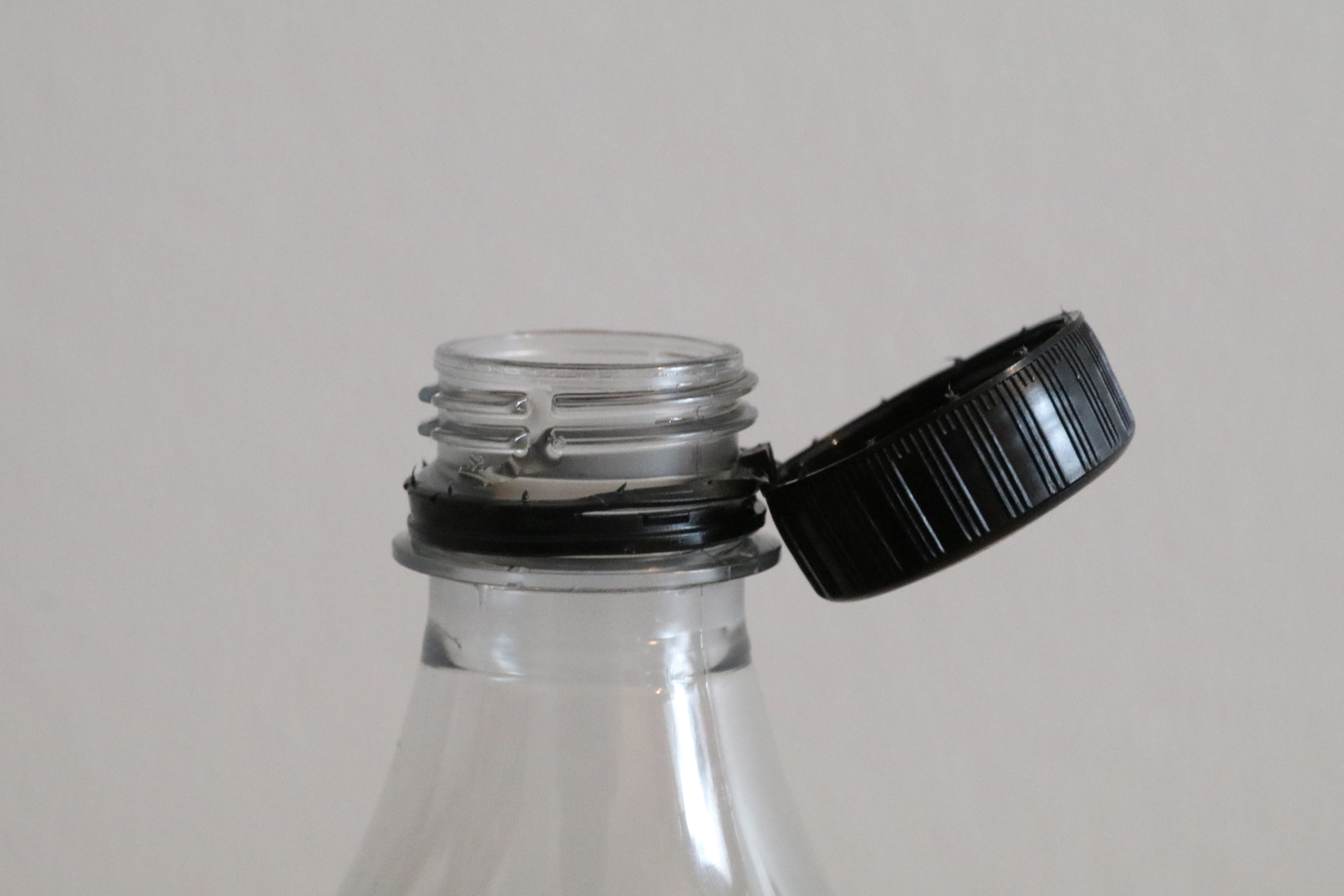
Tethered cap that remains attached to the bottle

Screw on closures are the most common bottle caps. They are easy to apply by a wide variety of automated equipment, or they can be applied by hand. The application torque of closures, however, must be controlled in order for the closures to perform properly in the field. Closures must be applied tight enough to maintain a seal and to resist closure back-off, but must not be applied so tightly that the end user cannot remove the closure. They are often found on top of beers, such as Coors or Bud Light.

Screw caps were originally an internal thread design. A glass bottle/jar with an internal screw-thread immediately below a gasket-seat, having a beveled seat, was patented by Hyman (Himan) Frank of the William Frank & Sons, Inc. of Pittsburgh, PA. He was awarded patent US 130208 A on August 6, 1872.

==== Tethered caps ====
In the European Union, the 2021 EU directive on "tethered caps" demands that screw caps of PET beverage bottles under 3 litres (including composite containers, i.e. carton) will have to be affixed to the bottles starting July 2024 in order to reduce waste and improve recycling.

== Closure lining materials ==
=== Plastisol ===
Plastisol is the standard lining material used in metal closures for vacuum packing glass bottles and jars. Plastisol is a flow-in compound, usually a dispersion of PVC resins in plasticizers. It forms a solid, self-bonding, sealing gasket in the closures. Plastisol liners are used in metal twist-off and metal continuous thread screw caps for use on hot-pack food products where the preservation of a vacuum is essential.

=== Pressure-sensitive liners (PS 22) ===
Styrene foam material coated on the down-facing side with torque-activated adhesive. Pressure-sensitive inner seals adhere to plastic or glass bottles with normal application torque. Pressures sensitive liners are supplied pressed into closures and adhere to the bottle finish when the closure is applied. Pressure-sensitive liners stick to the container because one side is coated with pockets of adhesive. When the closure is applied to the container, the pockets of adhesive rupture between the closure and finish of bottle or jar. The pressure-sensitive liners then stick to the bottle or jar and remain in place when the closure is removed. No extra equipment is required. The closures are supplied with a standard liner as a backing. This material needs a dry land area on the bottle and therefore is suitable only for use with dry products such as vitamins, foods and pharmaceuticals.

=== Polyseal cone liners ===
Molded in Low-Density Polyethylene, Polyseal cone liners form to the inside of the bottleneck providing a leakproof seal which guards against back-off and product evaporation. Excellent for use with acid products and essential oils, these closures are recommended for use on glass bottles only.

=== Linerless designs – land seal (crab’s claw) ===
A popular general purpose linerless sealing mechanism which can be used on most all bottles. The design typically features a 0.045” molded inner flange which when applied with normal application torque compresses to approximately one-half of its thickness while sealing against the bottle lip. The liner creates a watertight seal with a bottle having a minimum 0.065” wide sealing surface which is free of nicks, burrs or irregularities. This style linerless mechanism is available in popular dispensing caps and has the advantage of being simpler & cheaper to manufacture.

== Promotional use ==
Soda companies particularly use caps for promotion. A message is printed on the inside of the cap and people with the right message may win a prize. Since the bottle must be purchased to determine the message and win, people usually purchase more of the drink to increase their chances of winning. Some companies print interesting facts, riddles or games on the inside of caps.

A long-running promotion by the Coca-Cola company was the MyCokeRewards program started in 2006, whereby an alphanumeric code printed on the inside of the cap could be entered on Coca-Cola's website in return for points.

== Collecting ==
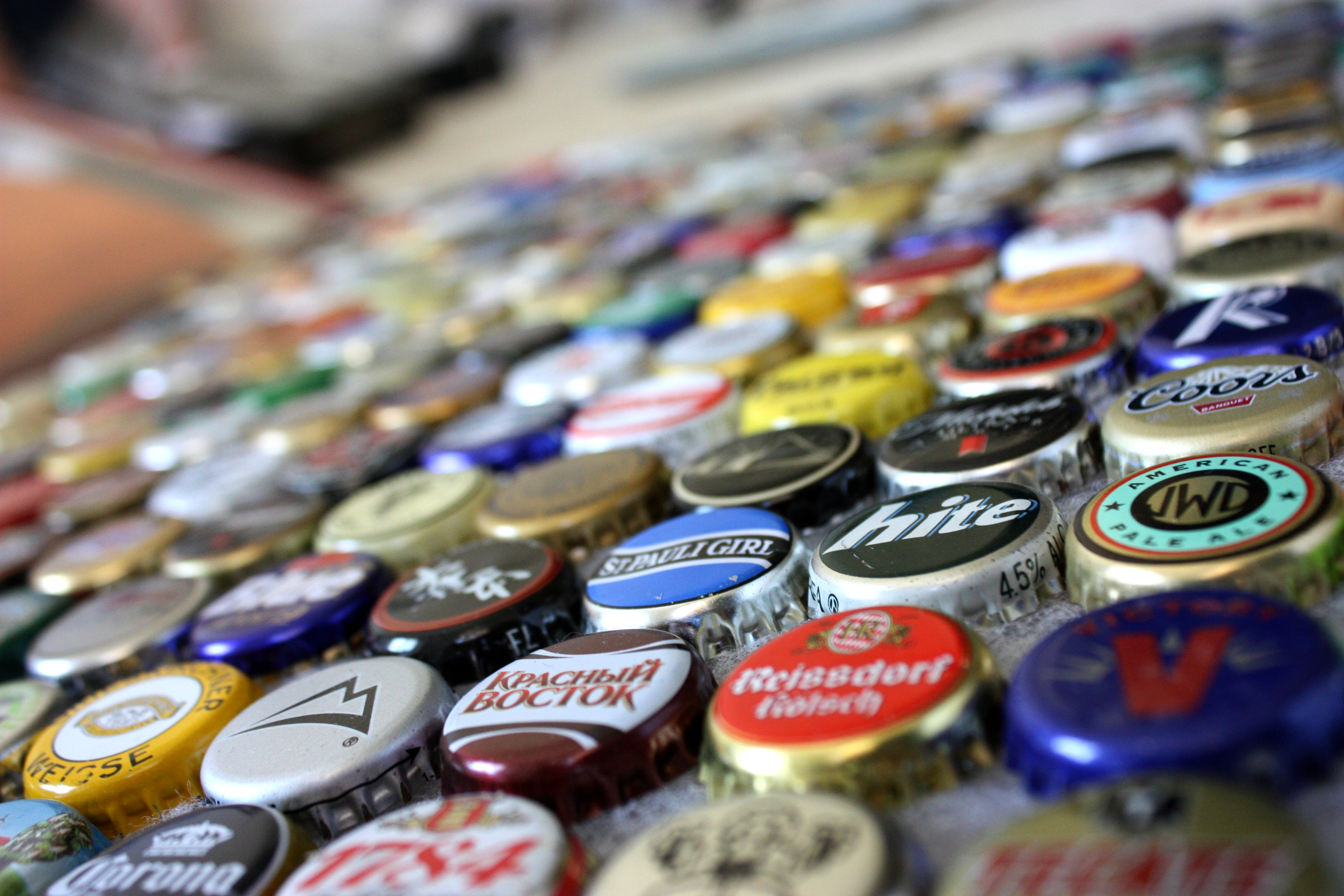
Crown caps displayed next to each other.

Bottle cap collecting is the hobby of collecting metallic crown caps or other bottle caps. The hobby may or may not include drinking beverages that have been sealed with crown caps. Opening bottles with traditional openers may damage the crown caps, thus some collectors use automatic bottle openers to avoid any substantial damage to the crown caps.

Poul Høegh Poulsen is the Guinness record holder for the largest collection in the world with over 101,700 bottle caps. However, according to another source, the largest collection is hold by Günter Offermann, who has total of 202,600 caps as of 2013. There is also a record for longest line of bottle caps, which is 87,575 bottle caps.

== In popular culture ==
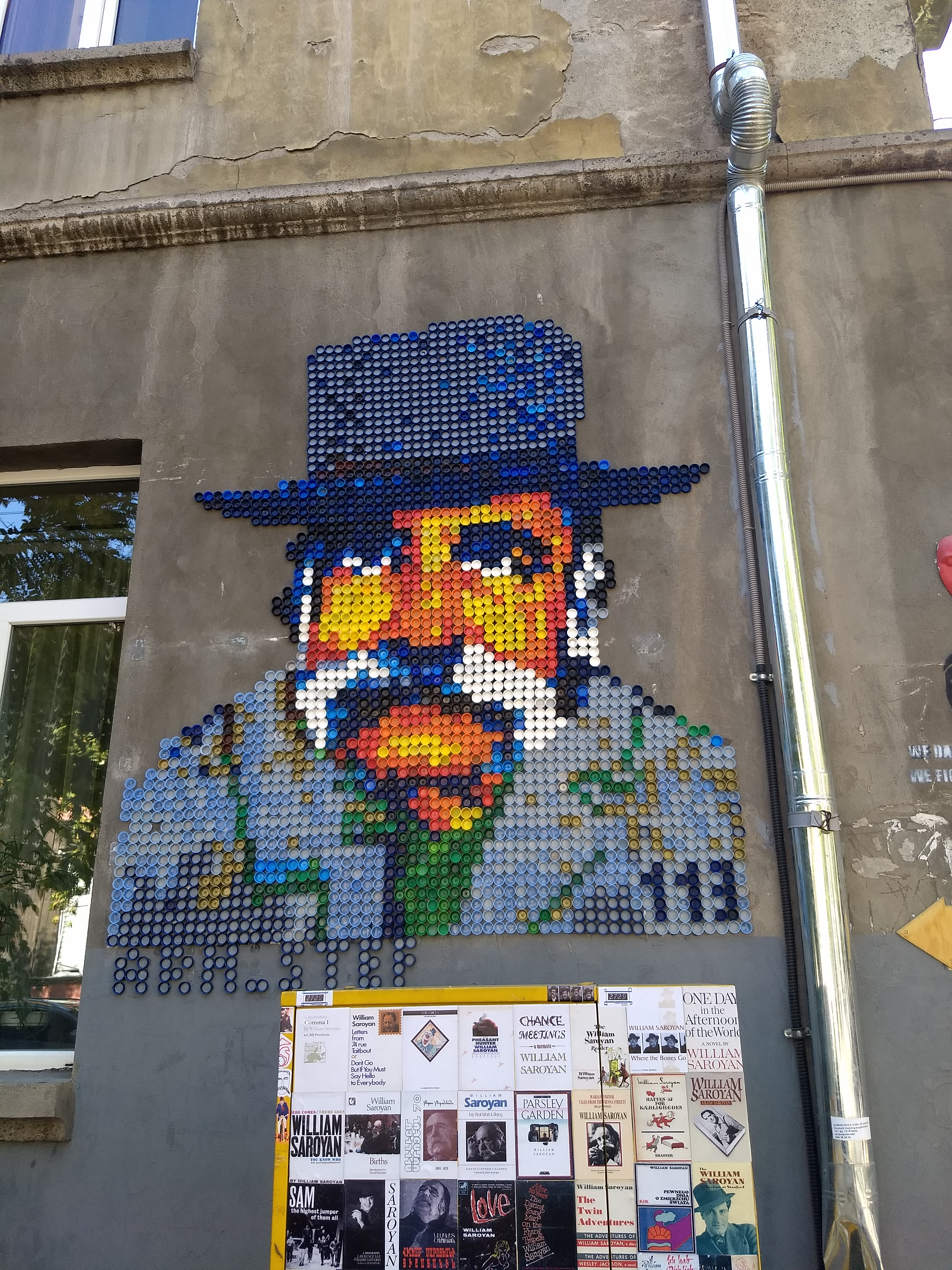
A portrait of William Saroyan made of plastic bottle caps in Yerevan, Armenia

One of the more prominent uses of the conventional metal bottle cap in popular culture is its use in the Fallout series of video games. In the series' post-apocalyptic world, bottle caps, usually shortened simply to "caps", have been widely adopted as a de facto currency. Although official currencies are used by some of the more developed factions, caps are essentially a universal medium of trade across the wasteland, to the point that the discovery of a working bottle cap press threatens to destabilize the economy.

== See also ==
- Beverage can
- Bottle Tops
- Closure (container)
- GPI standards for container finishes which include bottle caps
- Tamper resistant and tamper-evident
