= As d'Or =

Games award

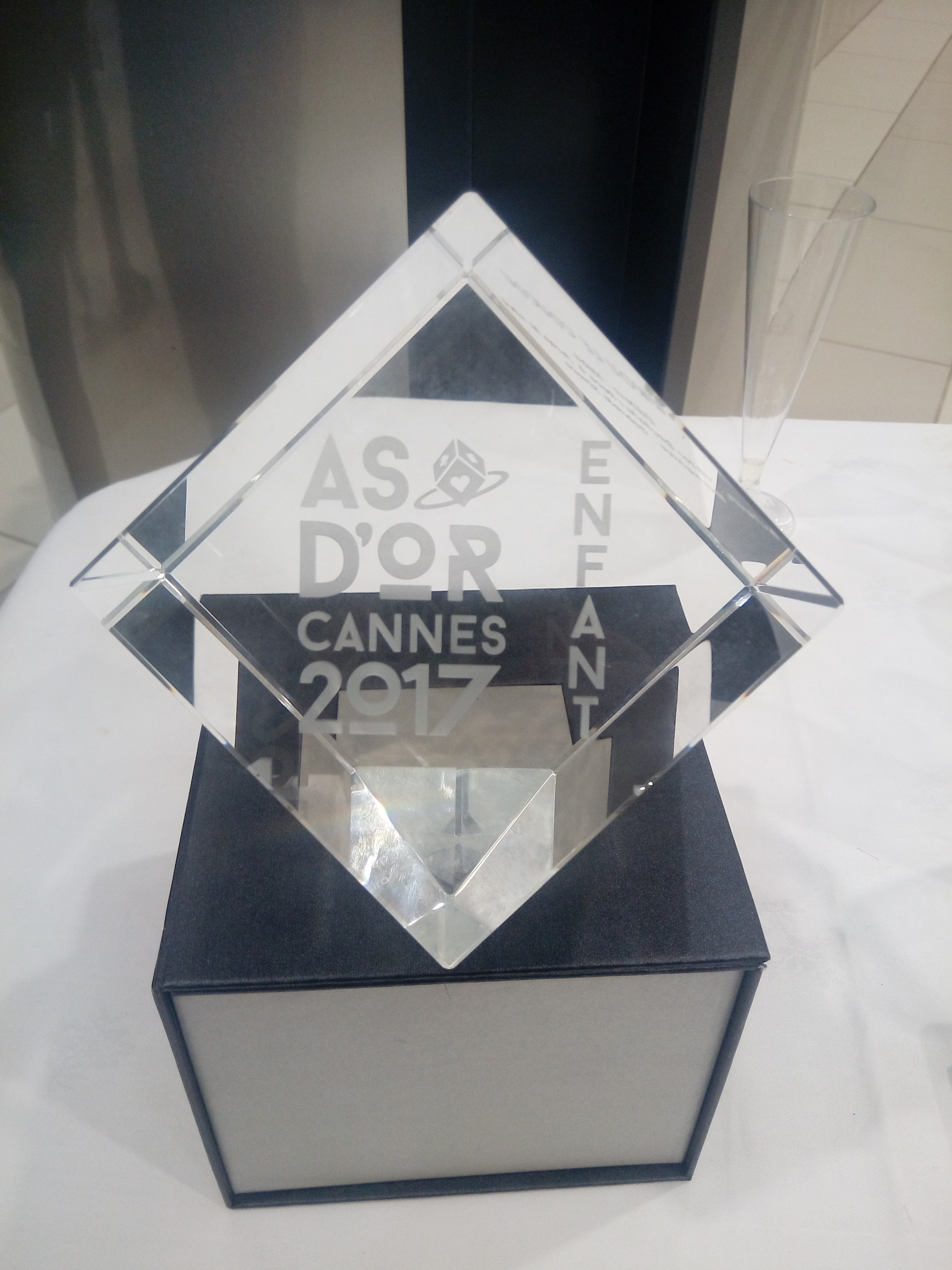
As d'Or

The As d'Or (Golden Ace) is a games award given out by a jury at the Festival International des Jeux in Cannes, France.

The awards were established in 1988 "to highlight the best games offered at the Festival and help festival-goers and the public in their gaming choices". From 1989 to 2003, a jury of journalists allotted "Golden Aces" by category to games presented by their editors. A special prize, the Super As d'Or, was allotted to the best game from any category.

In 2003, the process was modified to give more autonomy to the jury. A single As d'Or was awarded, and 10 nominees were announced.

In 2005, the award merged with the Jeu de l'Année. It was decided that the combined award should be named after the year of awarding rather than year of publication, so the first combined award was the 2005 As d'Or Jeu de l'Année with awards in three categories: public/family games, experts, and children. In 2012, the As d'Or Prix du Jury was added. The 2020 edition took place Thursday, February 20 and the nominees were presented at the end of January.

In 2022, a new category "Initié" (connoisseur) was created.

== Super As d'Or ==
Year	Game	Designer(s)	Publisher
1988	Supergang	Gérard Mathieu & Gérard Delfanti	Ludodélire
1989	Abalone	Michel Lalet & Laurent Lévi	Abalone
1990	Toutankhamon	Stefanie Rohner & Christian Wolf	Jumbo
1992	Quarto (board game)	Blaise Muller	Gigamic
1993	S.O.S. Plombier	Link Group International	Habourdin International
1994	Pusher	Werner Falkhof	Peri Spiele / Theta
1995	Condottière	Dominique Ehrhard	Eurogames
1996	Magic : l'Assemblée	Richard Garfield	Wizards of the Coast / Hasbro
1997	Gang of Four	Lee F. Yih	Dargaud / Asmodée / Days of Wonder
1998	Zatre	Manfred Schüling	Peri Spiele / Amigo / Gigamic
1999	La Route des Epices	Victor Lucas	Sentosphère
2000	Kahuna	Günter Cornett	KOSMOS / Tilsit
2001	Blokus	Bernard Tavitian	Sekkoïa / Winning Moves
2002	Bakari (game)	Virginia Charves	Tactic

== As d'Or ==
Year	Game	Designer(s)	Publisher
2003	Alhambra	Dirk Henn	Queen Games
2004-2005	Les Aventuriers du Rail	Alan R. Moon	Days of Wonder

== L'As d'Or Jeu de l'Année ==
L'As d'Or Jeu de l'Année combined in 2005 the L'As d'Or and the Jeu de l'Année into a single set of awards, presented in four categories.

=== As d'Or Jeu de l'Année (Grand Public) ===
Year	Game	Designer(s)	Publisher
2006	Time's Up!	Peter Sarrett	Repos Production
2007	Du Balai !	Bruno Cathala & Serge Laget	Asmodée
2008	Marrakech	Dominique Ehrhard	Gigamic
2009	Dixit	Jean-Louis Roubira	Libellud
2010	Identik (renamed Duplik)	William P. Jacobson & Amanda A. Kohout	Asmodée
2011	Skull and Roses	Hervé Marly	Lui-même
2012	Takenoko	Antoine Bauza	Matagot / Bombyx
2013	Andor	Michael Menzel	KOSMOS / Iello
2014	Concept	Alain Rivollet / Gaëtan Beaujannot	Repos Production
2015	Colt Express	Christophe Raimbault	Ludonaute
2016	Mysterium	Oleg Sidorenko & Oleksandr Nevskiy	Libellud
2017	Unlock!	Cyril Demaegd, Thomas Cauët, & Alice Carroll	Space Cowboys
2018	Azul	Michael Kiesling	Plan B Games
2019	The Mind	Wolfgang Warsch	Nürnberger-Spielkarten-Verlag
2020	Oriflamme	Adrien Hesling & Axel Hesling	Studio H
2021	MicroMacro: Crime City	Johannes Sich	Blackrock Games
2022	7 Wonders: Architects	Antoine Bauza	Repos Production
2023	Akropolis	Jules Messaud	Gigamic
2024	Trio	Kaya Miyano	Cocktail Games
2025	Odin	Yohan Goh, Hope S. Hwang and Gary Kim	Helvetiq
2026	Toy Battle	Paolo Mori & Alessandro Zucchini	Repos Production

=== As d'Or Grand Prix (Expert) ===
Year	Game	Designer(s)	Publisher
2012	Olympos	Philippe Keyaerts	Ystari Games
2013	Myrmes	Yoann Levet	Ystari Games
2014	Bruxelles 1893	Étienne Espreman	Pearl Games
2015	Five Tribes: The Djinns of Naqala	Bruno Cathala	Days of Wonder
2016	Pandémie Legacy	Matt Leacock & Rob Daviau	Z-Man Games / Filosofia
2017	Scythe	Jamey Stegmaier	Stonemaier Games
2018	Terraforming Mars	Jacob Fryxelius	FryxGames
2019	Detective	Ignacy Trzewiczek	Iello
2020	Res Arcana	Thomas Lehmann	Sand Castle Games
2021	The Crew	Thomas Sing	KOSMOS
2022	Dune: Imperium	Paul Dennen	Dire Wolf
2023	Ark Nova	Mathias Wigge	Capstone Games
2024	La Famiglia: The Great Mafia War	Maximilian Maria Thiel	Capstone Games
2025	Kutna Hora	Ondřej Bystroň, Petr Čáslava and Pavel Jarosch	Czech Games Edition & iello
2026	Civolution	Stefan Feld	Grail Games

=== As d'Or Jeu de l'Année Enfant (Children's Games) ===
Year	Game	Designer(s)	Publisher
2006	Splash attack	Thierry Chapeau	Gigamic
2007	La Nuit des magiciens	Jens-Peter Schliemann & Kirsten Becker	Drei Magier Spiele
2008	Les Chevaliers de la Tour	Christian Tiggemann	Haba
2009	Château Roquefort	Jens-Peter Schliemann & Bernhard Weber	Zoch
2010	Cache Moutons (reissued by Libellund in 2013 as Vite ! Cachons-nous !)	Frédéric Moyersoen	Zoch / Gigamic / Libellud
2011	SOS Octopus	Oliver Igelhaut	Filosofia
2012	Rik le Géant	Marco Teubner	Haba
2013	Tino Topini	Karin Hetling	Ravensburger
2014	Riff Raff	Christoph Cantzler	Zoch / Gigamic
2015	La Chasse aux Gigamons	Karim Aouidad & Johann Roussel	Elemon Games
2016	Maître Renard	Frédéric Vuagnat	Superlude
2017	Kikou le Coucou	Josep Maria Allué & Viktor Bautista i Roca	Haba
2018	Nom d'un renard !	Marisa Peña, Shanon Lyon, & Colt Tipton-Johnson	Game Factory
2019	Mr. Wolf	Marie Fort & Wilfried Fort	Blue Orange
2020	Attrape Rêves	Laurent Escoffier & David Franck	Space Cow
2021	Dragomino	Bruno Cathala, Marie Fort, Wilfried Fort	Blue Orange
2022	Bubble Stories	Matthew Dunstan	Blue Orange
2023	Flashback: Zombie Kidz	Marc-Antoine Doyon, Baptiste Derrez	Scorpion Masqué
2024	Mon Puzzle Aventure - Dragon	Antonin Boccarra, Romaric Galonnier	Game Flow
2025	Operation Noisette	Jerome Soleil and Emilie Soleil	Auzou
2026	L'île des Mookies	Florian Sirieix	Scorpion Masqué

=== As d'Or Jeu de l’année Initié (connoisseur) ===
New category created in 2022.

Year	Game	Designer(s)	Publisher
2022	Living Forest	Aske Christiansen	Ludonaute
2023	Challengers!	Markus Slawitscheck, Johannes Krenner	Z-Man Games
2024	Faraway	Johannes Goupy, Corentin Lebrat	Catch Up Games
2025	Behind	Cédric Millet	KYF Éditions
2026	Zenith	Grégory Grard, Mathieu Roussel	PlayPunk

=== As d'Or Prix du Jury ===
Year	Game	Designer(s)	Publisher
2008	Princes of Florence	Wolfgang Kramer, Richard Ulrich, Jens Christopher Ulrich	Ravensburger
2009	Agricola	Uwe Rosenberg	Lookout Games / Ystari Games
2010	Small World	Philippe Keyaerts	Days of Wonder
2011	7 Wonders	Antoine Bauza	Repos Production
2012	Sherlock Holmes détective conseil	Gary Grady, Suzanne Goldberg & Raymond Edwards	Ystari Games
2013	X-Wing Miniatures Game	Jay Little	FFG / Edge
2014	Les Bâtisseurs - Moyen-Âge	Frédéric Henry	Bombyx
2015	Loony Quest	Laurent Escoffier & David Franck	Libellud

== See also ==
- Gen Con
- Hellana Games - Festival of Games and History
- Lucca Comics & Games
- Origins Game Fair
- Spiel
- UK GamesExpo
