= Arno Steinwender =

Austrian board game designer and teacher (born 1976)

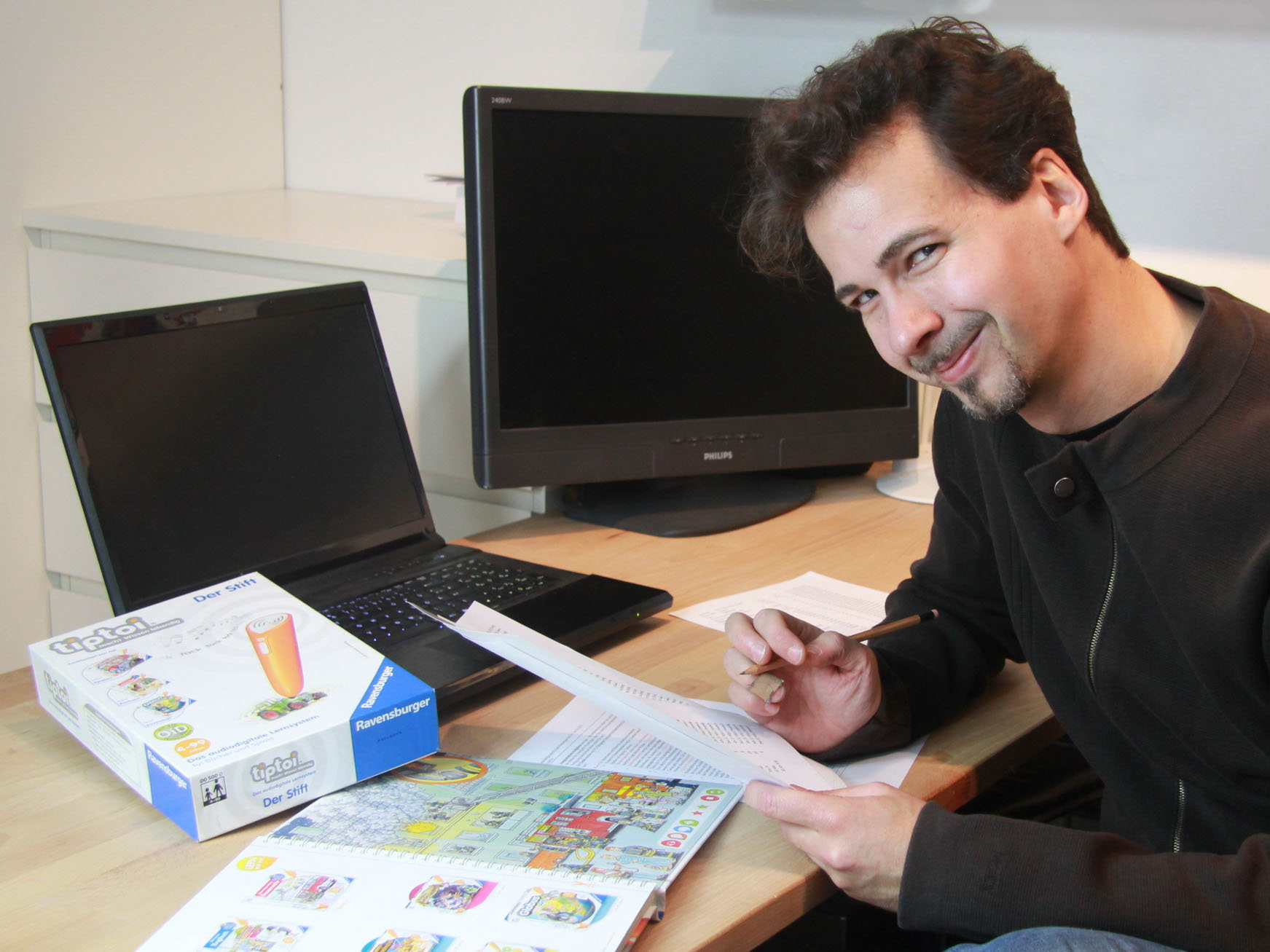
Arno Steinwender (2012)

Arno Steinwender (born 16 November 1976) is an Austrian board game designer and teacher. In his free time he develops board games, for which he has won several awards.

== Career ==
After graduating from the University of Vienna Steinwender began working as a teacher of mathematics and physics in school Komenský. He created the website spieletest.at, which is now one of the largest information portals about games in the German speaking world. His first game, Venga-Venga!, was released by the publishing house Selecta Spielzeug. Steinwender creates about twenty game prototypes a year and is one of the most popular Austrian board game designers. He has interviews in newspapers and television broadcasts. He accepts contract work and one of his clients is the Austrian public transport organisation Wiener Linien.

== Notable games ==
- 2003: Venga-Venga! (publishing house Selecta, co-author Ronald Hofstätter; award Spiel der Spiele: Hitgame for children 2004 (Austria))
- 2004: Zappelfische (publishing house Ravensburger, co-author Ronald Hofstätter)
- 2005: Kleiner Eisbär, auf in die Sonne! (publishing house Schmidt Spiele, co-author Christoph Puhl)
- 2005: Pssst! (publishing house Piatnik, co-author Christoph Puhl)
- 2006: Sternenschweif - Sprung in die Nacht (publishing house Kosmos, co-author Christoph Puhl)
- 2006: Sheepworld - Schäfchen zählen (publishing house Ravensburger, co-author Andrea Steinhauser)
- 2007: Seesternparty (publishing house Noris-Spiele, co-author Wilfried Lepuschitz)
- 2007: Wurmsalat (publishing house Noris-Spiele, co-author Andrea Steinhauser)
- 2007: Chut! Le petit dort (publishing house Piatnik, co-author Christoph Puhl)
- 2007: Zug fährt ab! (publishing house Noris-Spiele, co-author Andrea Steinhauser)
- 2008: Deukalion (publishing house Hasbro, co-author Wilfried Lepuschitz)
- 2008: Europa-Wissen (publishing house Noris-Spiele, co-author Christoph Puhl)
- 2008: Winnie the Poo - Kubuś w Stumilowym Lesie (publishing house Trefl, co-author Ronald Hofstätter, Christoph Puhl)
- 2009: Europa-Wissen Deutschland (publishing house Noris, co-author Christoph Puhl)
- 2009: Scooby Doo Help! (publishing house: Trefl, co-author Ronald Hofstätter, Christoph Puhl)
- 2010: Take it or leave it (publishing house Schmidt Spiele, co-author Christoph Puhl)
- 2011: Tohuwabohu – Berühmt berüchtigt (publishing house Ravensburger, co-authors Wilfried Lepuschitz, Ronald Hofstätter, Laura Di Centa)
- 2011: Tohuwabohu – Einfach tierisch (publishing house Ravensburger, co-authors Wilfried Lepuschitz, Ronald Hofstätter, Laura Di Centa)
- 2011: Wolf im Schafspelz (publishing house Huch! & friends, co-author Wilfried Lepuschitz)
- 2011: Bahnbau Spiel B63 (co-author Ronald Hofstätter; for Wiener Linien, produced by White Castle Games)
- 2011: Bremer Stadtmusikanten (publishing house Coppenrath Verlag, co-author Wilfried Lepuschitz)
- 2012: Make'n'Break Party (publishing house Ravensburger, co-author Wilfried Lepuschitz)
- 2012: Ratespaß auf Reisen (publishing house Ravensburger, co-author Ronald Hofstätter)
- 2012: Barbar und die Abenteuer von Badou – Das Kartenspiel (publishing house Huch! & friends, co-author Wilfried Lepuschitz)
- 2012: Take it or leave it (publishing house Gamewright Games, co-author Christoph Puhl; awarded with the Major Fun Award, Tillywig Brain Child Award and Parents' Choice Silver Honor ((USA))
- 2012: Daj gryza! (publishing house Trefl, co-author Ronald Hofstätter)
- 2013: Professor Tempus (publishing house Gigamic, Vertrieb: Asmodee, co-author Wilfried Lepuschitz)
- 2014: Ganz Wien - mit Ubahn, Bus und Bim (for Wiener Linien, produced by White Castle Games)
- 2014: Tom Turbo - Jagd auf Fritz Fantom (publishing house Piatnik, co-author Christoph Puhl; based on the TV series of the same name)
- 2015: SOLOmino (publishing house Amigo, co-author Wilfried Lepuschitz)
- 2015: Das Expedition Natur Spiel (publishing house moses., co-author Christoph Puhl)
- 2015: Mount Pingo (publishing house Huch! & friends, co-author Christoph Puhl)
- 2015: Wo ist bitte Umtata? (publishing house moses.)
- 2016: Bataille de Polochons (publishing house Megableu, co-author Thomas Daum)
- 2016: Fish Day (publishing house Zvezda)
- 2017: Emoji Twist! (publishing house Ravensburger)
- 2017: Das Spiel mit dem Essen (publishing house Piatnik)
- 2017: Smart10 (publishing house Martinex, co-author Christoph Reiser; awarded Best Adult Game at the Årets vuxenspel 2017 (Sweden))
- 2017: Das Rotkäppchen Duell (publishing house Carletto, co-author Christoph Reiser)
- 2018: #nosecrets (publishing house: moses., co-author: Markus Slawitscheck)
- 2018: (Come on) Let´s Quiz again (publishing house: moses.)
- 2018: Matschbirne (publishing house: Goliath Toys)
- 2018: Das Maß aller Dinge (publishing house: Gamefactory, co-author: Christoph Puhl)
- 2019: Quiz it! (publishing house: Rudy Games)
- 2020: Starlink (publishing house: Blue Orange Games, co-author: Markus Slawitscheck)
- 2020: CloudAge (publishing houses: dlp games, Nanox Games, Capstone Games, Co-author: Alexander Pfister)
- 2021: QUIZscape (publishing house: moses.)
- 2021: Smart 10 Family (publishing house: Piatnik, co-author: Christoph Reiser)
- 2022: Activity Chaos (publishing house: Piatnik, co-author: Wilfried Lepuschitz)
- 2022: Die magischen Schlüssel (#오키도키 원정대, Magic Keys, Clefs Magiques) (publishing house: Happy Baobab, Blackrock Games, Game Factory, co-author: Markus Slawitscheck); awarded Kinderspiel des Jahres 2024
- 2023: Wortwerk (publishing house: moses.)
- 2024: Arbolito (publishing house: Lifestyle Games)
- 2024: Scope (publishing house: Martinex, co-author: Paul Schulz))
- 2024: Desítka Olympijské hry (publishing house: Mindok, co-author: Christoph Reiser))
- 2025: Nichts als die Wahrheit (publishing house: Huch!, co-author: Paul Schulz))
- 2025: Criss Cross Categories (publishing house: Moses., co-author: Ara Karapetyan))
- 2025: Quiz Challenge Europa (publishing house: HABA, co-author: Paul Schulz))
- 2025: Smart 10 – Red Light Edition (publishing house: Martinex, co-author: Christoph Reiser))
- 2025: Bei dir piept’s wohl! (publishing house: EMF, co-author: Wilfried Lepuschitz))
- 2025: Smart 10 – Spotlight (publishing house: Piatnik, co-author: Christoph Reiser)
- 2025: Blitzwisser (Verlag: Game Factory)
- 2025: Nichts als die Wahrheit (publishing house: Huch!, co-author: Paul Schulz)
- 2026: What´s Next?! (publishing house: Abacus Spiele, co-author: Ralf zur Linde)
- 2026: Flaming Facts (publishing house: Huch!)
- 2026: Smart 10 - Lord of the Rings (publishing house: Piatnik, co-author: Christoph Reiser)
- 2026: Stereo Rätsel (publishing house: Topp-Kreativ, co-author: Ralf zur Linde)
- 2026: Die Insel der unsichtbaren Tiere (publishing house: Drei Magier, co-author: Markus Slawitscheck)
