= Blue Orange (disambiguation) =

Blue Orange is a French board-game company.

Blue Orange may also refer to:

- Blue/Orange, an English play
  - Blue/Orange (film), a 2005 English film based on the play
- Blue Oranges, a 2009 Bollywood film
- BlueOrange Bank, now BluOr Bank AS, a Latvian bank
- Blue Orange Games, a Californian board-game company
- Blue Orange Theatre, a theater in Birmingham, England

== See also ==
- Blue (disambiguation)
- Orange (disambiguation)
- Orange and Blue (disambiguation)
- Tintin and the Blue Oranges, a 1964 French film
