= Switch 16 =

Children's board game

- 2001 edition
- Years active: 7 and up
- Genres: Dice rolling
- Players: 2–4
- Playing time: 20 minutes
- Chance: Yes
- Skills: Simple addition

Switch 16 is a children's board game published by Tomy in 2001.

== Description ==
Switch 16 is a card-shedding game using dice designed for 2–4 players of ages 7 and up.

=== Components ===
The game comes with

- A plastic centerpiece that holds four stacks of cards, with a felt-lined central dish for throwing the dice
- Five normal six-sided dice and one special six-sided die
- Four stacks of cards numbered 1 to 16
- Rule sheet

=== Set-up ===
Each player receives a stack of cards ordered from 1 to 16 with the "1" card on top. These are placed face-up in the card holder in front of the player.

=== Gameplay ===
Each player in turn rolls three six-sided dice and a special die.

- The special die has various instructions on it that must be followed immediately. For example, the active player may have to swap their stack of cards with another player.
- Once actions from the special die have been resolved, the active player then looks at the three regular dice. If any of the dice match the top card in the player's stack (a "1" at the start of the game), then the player discards that card. If either of the other two dice have the number of the next card now revealed, the player also discards that card. If the third and last die has the number of the next revealed card, that card can also be discarded.
- If the active player succeeded in discarding at least one card, they now have a choice—to voluntarily pass the dice to the next player, or to try another roll of the dice. If the player chooses to roll again and fails to discard at least one card, the player must take back all of the cards discarded during their turn, and pass the dice to the next player.
- If the active player did not succeed in discarding at least one card on their first roll, play passes to the next player.

As the active player's top card increases in value, the player can use more dice per roll — four dice when the top card is 5 through 8, and five dice when the top card is 9 through 12.

=== Victory conditions ===
The player to first shed all of their cards wins the game.

== Publication history ==
Switch 16 was designed by Anthony Vadasz, and published by Tomy in 2001. It has since been published by Goliath P.V., Piatnik and Pressman Toy Corporation under three different names: Switch, Switch 16 and Roll Over 16.

== Reception ==
On the Austrian game review site Spieltest, although Arno Steinwender called the game "brisk", he found himself bored since the game has very little player interaction. He liked the padded surface of the dice pit, but thought that throwing the dice was more fun than the actual game. He rated the game 2 out of 4 for long-term playability, 0 out of 4 for the rulebook, 3 out of 4 for the components, and an overall rating of 5 out of 10. He concluded, "If you like gambling like dice poker, this is the place for you!"
