= Alexandre Egorov =

Russian painter and Haiku poet

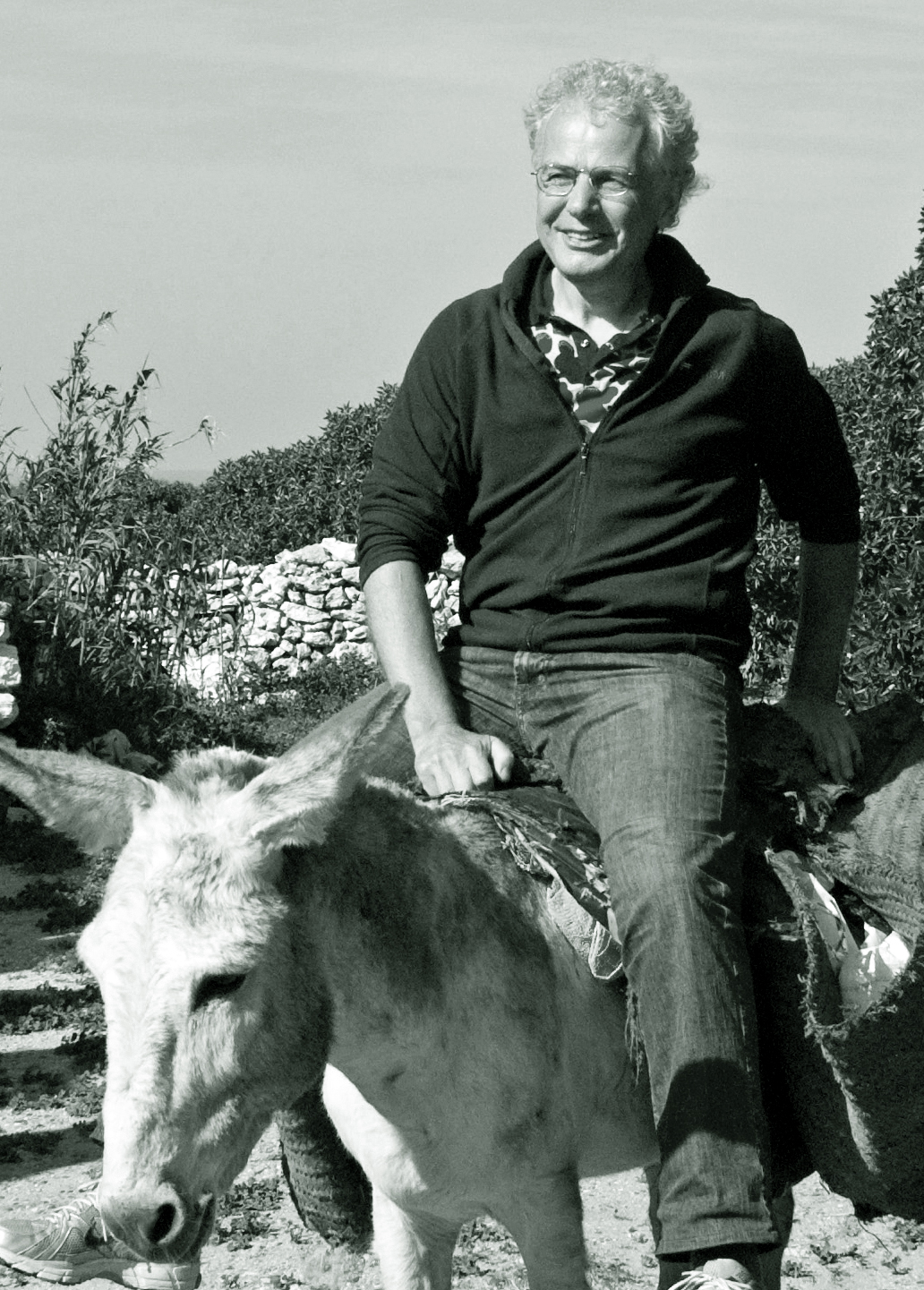
Alexandre Egorov in 2013

Alexandre Egorov (Russian: Алекса́ндр Егоров; born 31 December 1954, Saint Petersburg, Russia) is a Russian painter and Haiku poet.

== Early life ==
Egorov was educated as a painter by Art Studio of Lev Ovchinnikov and as graphic artist by Imperial Academy of Arts in St. Petersburg. In St. Petersburg he worked as an animated artist in the Studio of popular science films. Egorov was the first who designed Russian Tarot Cards, which was printed by Piatnik in Vienna in 1992.

The origin of his artistic creation goes back to the Silver Age, to the Russian cosmists of the 19th and the 20th century. The essence of their art comes from the understanding, that the inner world of a human being is of cosmic nature, has a cosmic meaning and implies cosmic responsibility. His artistic world is based on the work of Malevich, of Kandinsky and of the cosmists' movement. The experience that we are all one presents an artist with a challenge to witness this condition and to create something that unites contradictions and reflects the harmony of the world. He creates a fairy tale about a timeless world, without conflicts between good and bad - a story expressing the desire for excellence. For deeper understanding in 1998 he became a Dzogchen practician, lineage of (Namkhai Norbu Rinpoche).

== Paintings ==
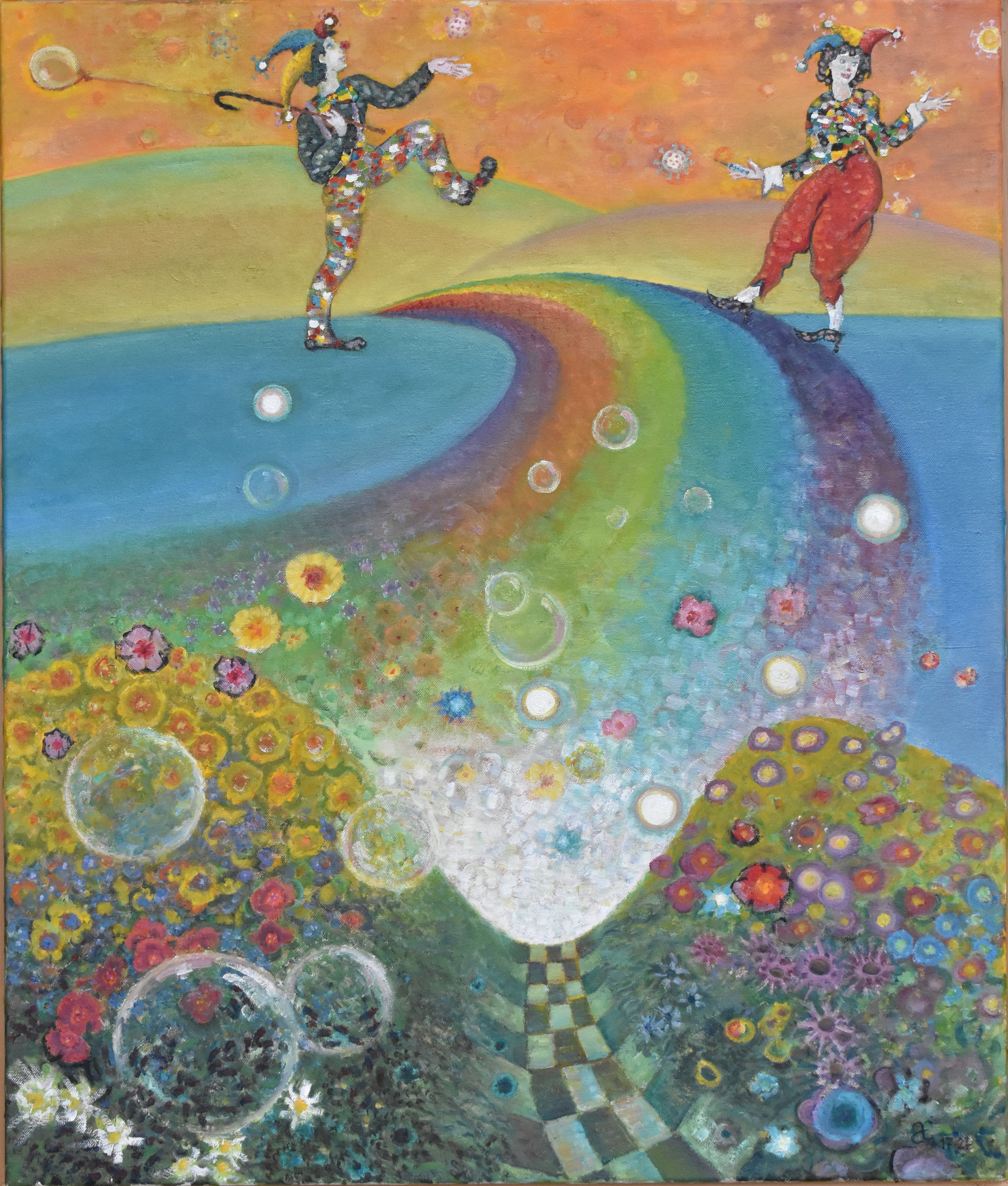
Clowns with a syringe, 2017-2021, oil on canvas, 82 x 68

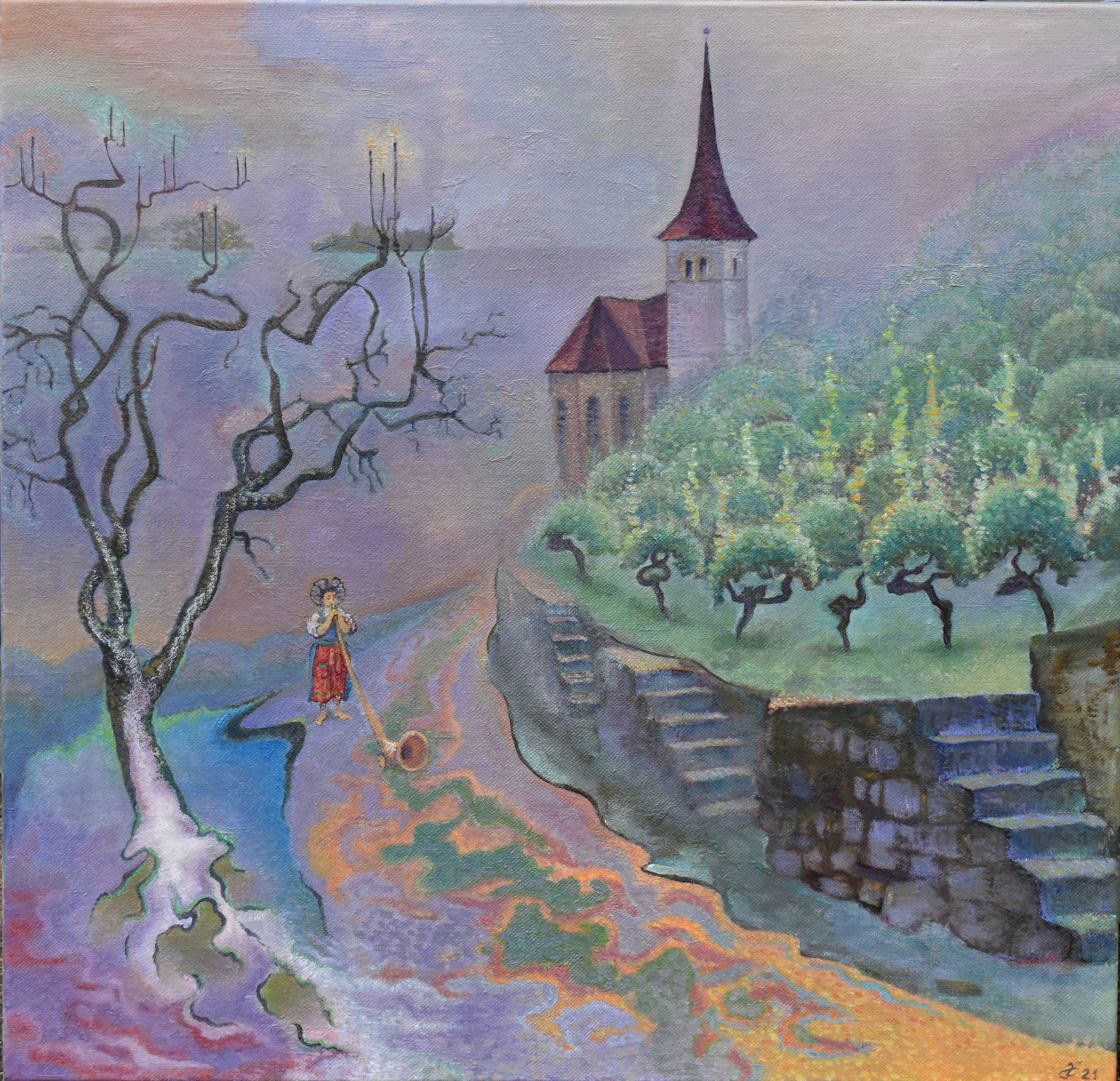
Alphorn In Ligerz, 2021, oil on canvas, 88 x 91

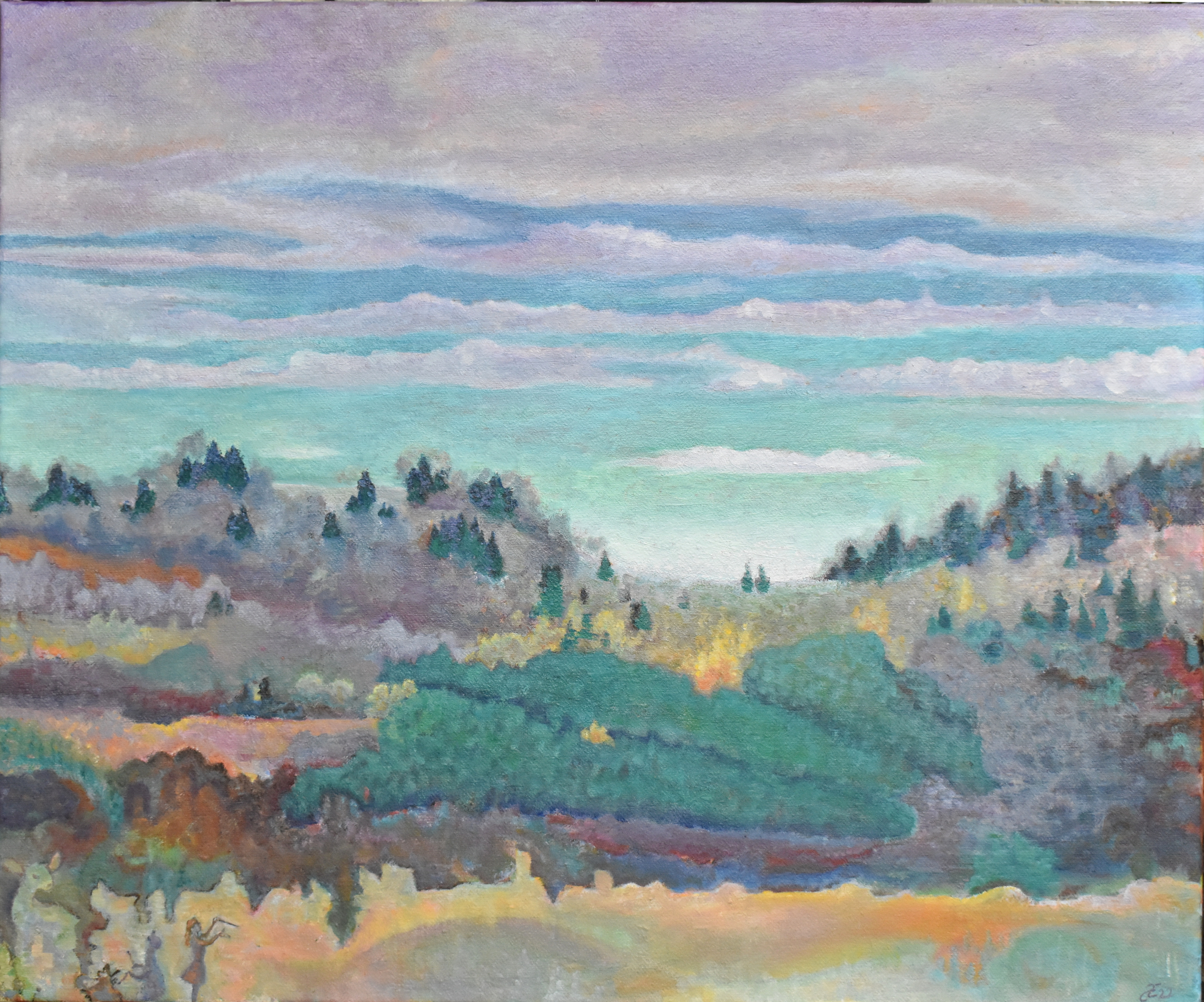
Melody of the Hills, 2022, oil on canvas, 78 x 94

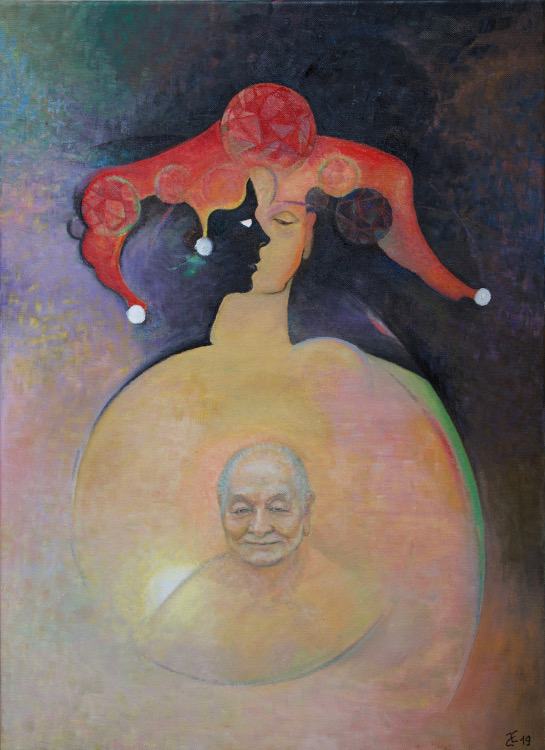
Fool's Dream, 2019, oil on canvas, 110 x 80

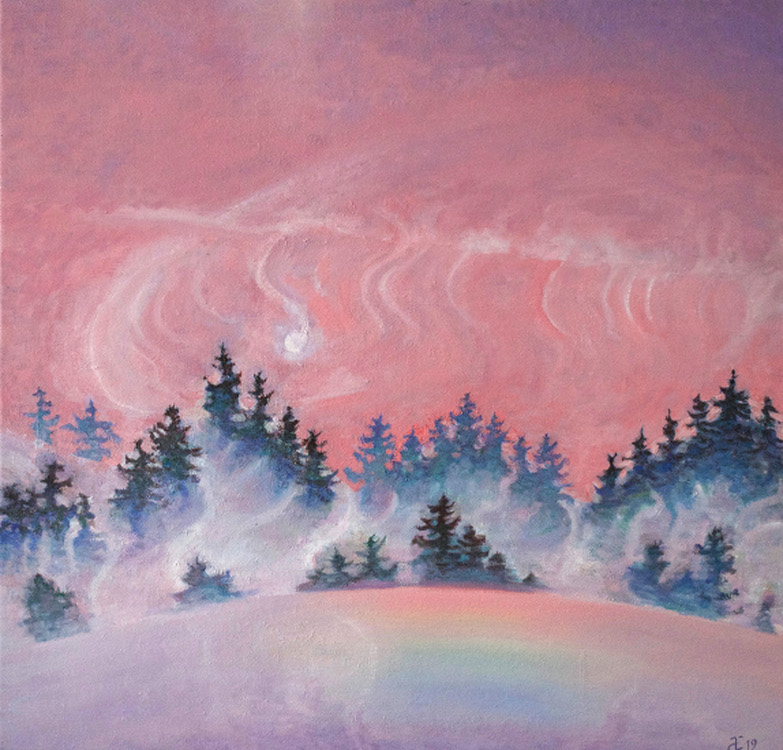
The Song of the Bee, 2019, oil on canvas, 75 x 78

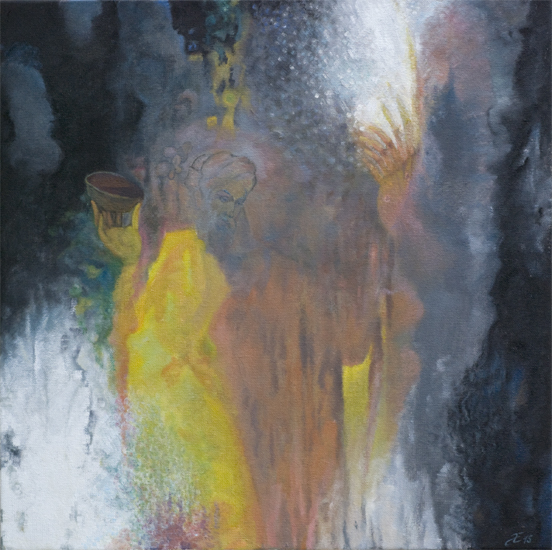
Omar Khayyam, 2015, oil on canvas, 80 x 80

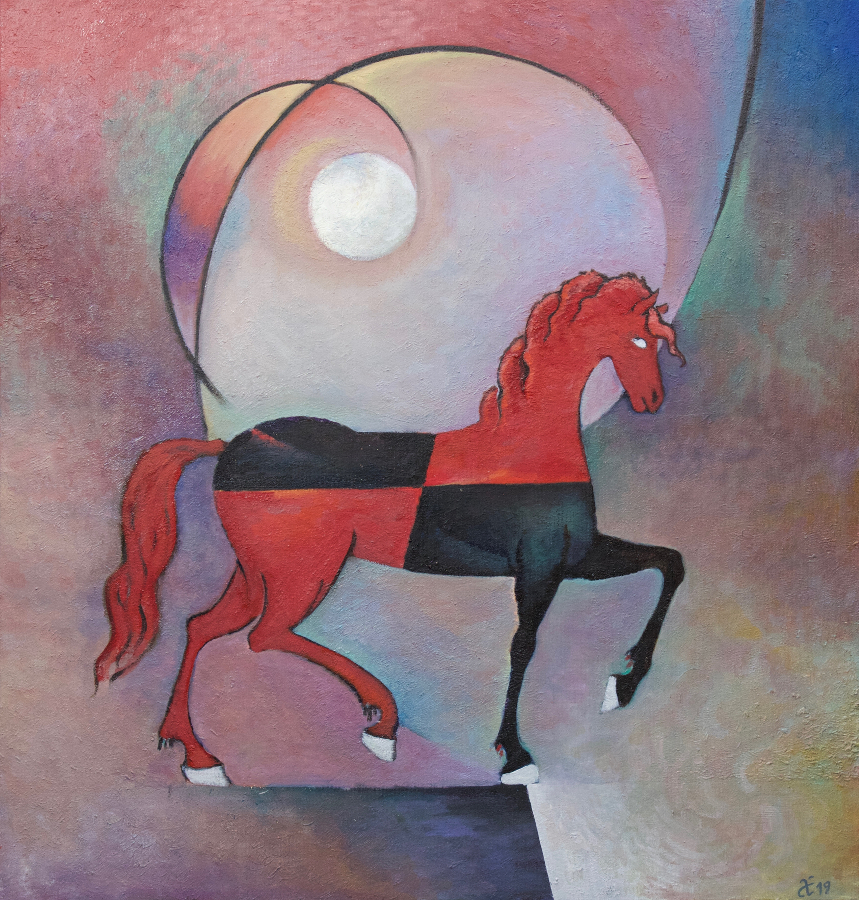
Fool's Horse, 2019, oil on canvas, 81 x 78

== Tarot Decks by Egorov ==
- Egorov Tarot Cards (Ferd.Piatnik & Söhne, Vienna) - 1992
- Virgin Tarot Cards (Collection of Stuart R. Kaplan, Stamford) - 1993
- Rambles into Arkansas Tarot (Collection of Stuart R. Kaplan, Stamford) - 1993
- Russian Historical Tarot Cards (Ferd. Piatnik & Söhne, Wien) - 1994
- Fairy Tale Tarot Cards (Ferd. Piatnik & Söhne, Wien) - 1995
- Duo Zikr Playing Cards (Private collection, St.Petersburg) - 1999
- Alexander Egorov Tarot Cards (Collection of Stuart R. Kaplan, Stamford) - 2001
