= Orange and Blue =

Orange and Blue may refer to:

- Orange and Blue (album), a 1994 jazz album by Al Di Meola
- "The Orange and Blue", a fight song of the Florida Gators
- Orange and Blue, a horse race held at Balmoral Park, Illinois

== See also ==
- Blue (disambiguation)
- Blue Orange (disambiguation)
- Orange (disambiguation)
- Orange–blue coalition, a type of coalition in Belgian politics
