= Wer Hat Mehr? =

Wer Hat Mehr? (also called Where's Bob's Hat?) is a card game published in 1990 by Piatnik.

== Contents ==
Wer Hat Mehr? is a game in which 64 colorfully illustrated playing cards are included.

== Reception ==
Philip Murphy reviewed Wer Hat Mehr? for Games International magazine, and gave it a rating of 7 out of 10, and stated that "The game is cleverly designed so that it cannot be played with normal playing cards without combining two decks and defacing half of one of them."
