= Rettet Die Umwelt =

Card game

Rettet Die Umwelt is a card game published in 1990 by Piatnik.

== Contents ==
Rettet Die Umwelt is a game in which each player must clean up their own ecosystem, while stopping other players from cleaning theirs.

== Reception ==
Jonathan Turner reviewed Rettet Die Umwelt for Games International magazine, and gave it a rating of 4 out of 10, and stated that "it is extremely heartening to see a game concerned with environmental issues on the market, especially one as well presented as this – the cards are beautifully, and thoroughly, illustrated – but because of its faults, I am still waiting for a game in which the environment is cleaned up in a realistic way."
