= Jeu de l'année =

The Jeu de l'année (French for Game of the Year) was a French games award, given by the Association de Promotion et d'Evaluation des Jeux in October to outstanding parlour games

- published during the previous year
- published in the French language
- available in sufficiently many stores

In 2005 the Jeu de l'année merged with the As d'Or. The 2020 edition took place on Thursday, February 20 and the nominees were announced at the end of January.

== Previous awards ==
=== 2004 ===
Winner

- Squad Seven - Roberto Fraga, TF1 Games/Fox Mind Games

Finalists

- Crazy Circus - Dominique Ehrhard, Fox Mind Games
- Queen's Necklace (Le Collier de la Reine) - Bruno Cathala and Bruno Faidutti
- Gobblet - Thierry Denoual, Gigamic
- Composio - Jean Fin, TF1 Games
- Serengeti - Michael Schacht
- Mare Nostrum - Serge Laget, Eurogames

=== 2003 ===
Winner

- War of the Sheep (La Guerre des Moutons) - Philippe des Pallières, Asmodée

Finalists

- Evo - Philippe Keyaerts, Eurogames
- Werewolf (Les Loups-Garous de Thiercelieux) - Philippe des Pallières and Hervé Marly, Lui-Même
- Medina - Stefan Dorra, Hans im Glück
- San Marco - Alan R. Moon and Aaron Weissblum, Ravensburger
- Mexica - Michael Kiesling and Wolfgang Kramer, Ravensburger

== See also ==
- Spiel des Jahres
