= Vipap Videm Krško =

Slovenian paper manufacturer

VIPAP VIDEM KRŠKO d.d.
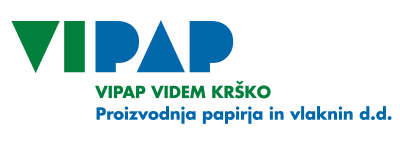

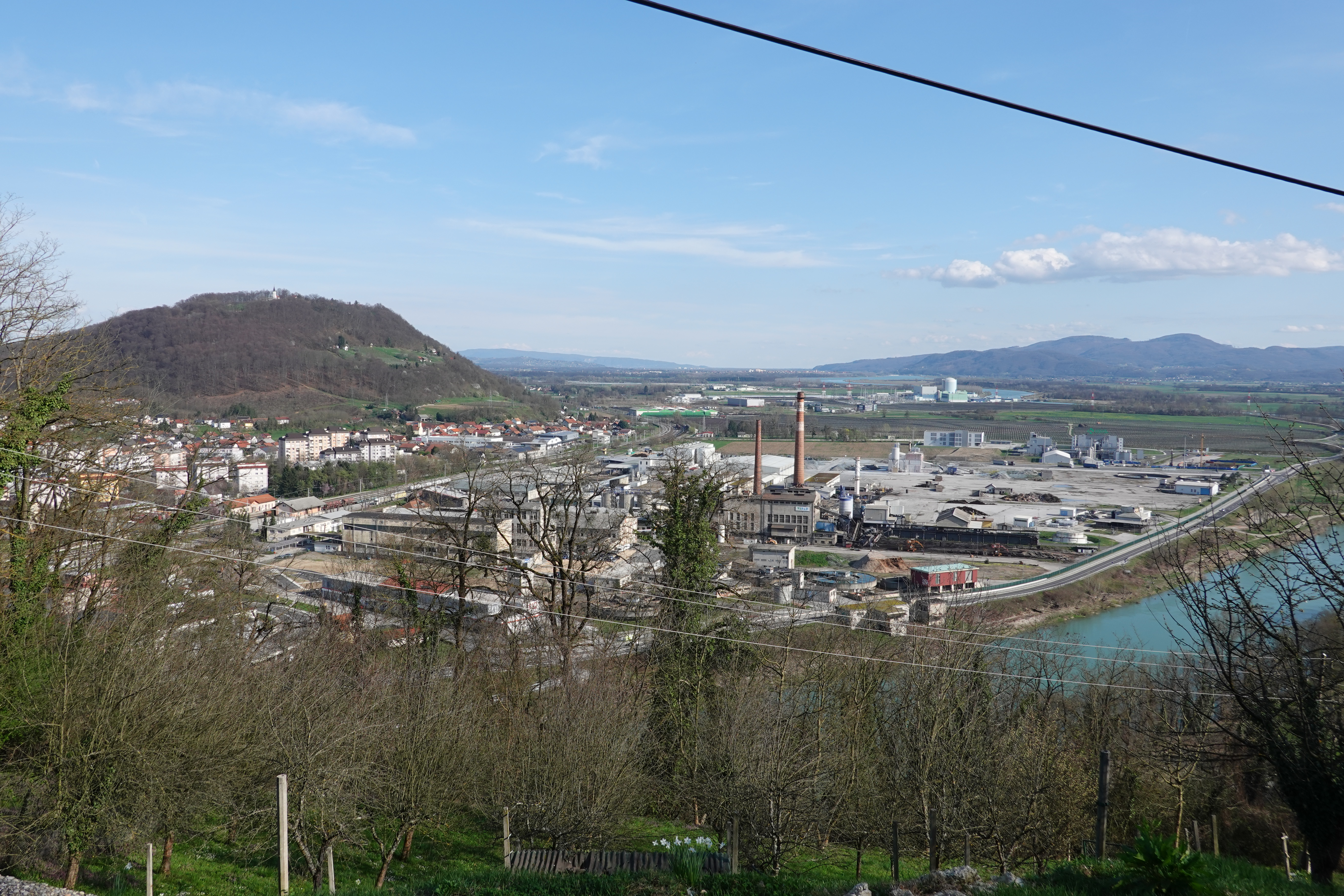
- Industry: Paper and packaging
- Founded: 1939
- Founder: Fran Bonač
- Headquarters: Krško, Slovenia
- Key people: Petr Domin (CEO)
- Number of employees: 350 (2019)
- Website: www.vipap.si

Vipap Videm Krško is the largest paper producer in Slovenia and also one of the largest suppliers of newsprint and magazine paper in Central and South-eastern Europe. Its production exceeds 200,000 tons of paper every year. In addition to newsprint, magazine paper and leaflets, the company focuses on the production of packaging paper as well. Vipap Videm Krško also wholly owns Levas Krško, a company producing wooden pallets for the transport of goods.

Until 2019, the Czech Republic, through the Ministry of Finance, was the owner of the paper mill located in the town of Krško in south-eastern Slovenia. Then the company was bought for CZK 250,000,000 by the Czech investment firm RIDG, which announced plans to restructure production and invest in the modernization of Vipap Videm Krško.

== History ==
The foundation for Vipap Videm Krško was laid in 1939 by Fran Bonač, who built a pulp mill in the small village of Videm near the Slovenian town of Krško. It was an expansion of an already existing enterprise, because Bonač's father owned a cardboard factory in Ljubljana, which Fran took over from him in 1909. In 1937, the family business expanded to Zagreb (currently Croatia) followed by Krško. Bonač found this location interesting for the resources needed for paper production - good railway connections, enough water and wood supplies.

Bonač had the paper mill project prepared by engineer Fritsch, who already had experience in operating a pulp and paper factory not only in Drvar (currently Bosnia and Herzegovina), but also elsewhere in the then Kingdom of Yugoslavia. He came to Krško from Radeč, where he worked as a chief engineer at Piatnik's paper and cardboard factory. Fritsch was joined by the young foreman Jože Kolšek, who Fritsch praised for his diligence and talent. The main technologists Pokorny and Bachtig moved to Krško as well, as did Fritsch from Drvar.

The new paper mill employed 180 locals in 1939, but World War II soon cause a discontinuation in production. It was restored in 1946. By 1975, the number of production lines had grown to four, and in 1976 a new pulp production was launched.

The number of employees grew to 3,000 in the '80s. At that time the whole company was closely connected with the village life. A football club Celulozar was named after it, the swimming club had the same name and the workers founded a local music band. The company produced 122,000 tons of pulp and 130,000 tons of paper per year. However, after the break-up of Yugoslavia, the decline began. Among other things, due to the fact that the paper mill suddenly had to face foreign competition. Later, parts of the paper mill's assets were sold.

The Czech participation in the Vipap Videm Krško paper mill dates back to 1996, when the company was bought by the Ostrava company ICEC. At the time, it was one of the largest Czech investments abroad. Two years later, when ICEC was over-indebted, the company belonged to IPB bank, where it served as collateral for loans.

After the bankruptcy of IPB in 2000, the shares of Vipap Videm Krško were transferred to ČSOB. After arbitration disputes, it finally transferred them to the Czech Consolidation Agency in 2007, from which it was acquired in 2008 by the Czech Ministry of Finance.

Between 1997 and 2015, the company invested more than €150 million in modernizing technological processes and reducing the impact of production on the environment. The volume of pulp and paper production in this period reached 440,000 tons per year.

Within a few following years, the Czech Republic tried to sell the loss-making paper mill several times, unsuccessfully. It did not succeed until 2019, when the Czech investment firm RIDG, formed by a consortium of Portiva, the IPDC Group, the Investment Club and KRPA Holding, took over the company for approximately CZK 250,000,000. The Czech Republic received about CZK 60,000,000 and the remaining approximately CZK 190,000,000 went to the account of two Slovenian and one Austrian banks in exchange for receivables from Vipap Videm Krško in the amount of CZK 1,250,000,000 which RIDG bought.

== Present ==
The current production of the Vipap Videm Krško paper mill reaches approximately 200,000 tons of paper per year. The company employs over 350 people and its operating profit before tax and interest (EBITDA) in 2019 reached €7,000,000.

In 2020, the company started a restructuring, in which the share of newsprint and magazine paper in production is to fall from the current 90% to 50% within three years. The company will focus more on the production of food packaging paper. The segment of paper bags, carrier bags or laminated paper (to which Vipap supplies the basic raw material) is also on the rise. The new technologies, in which the company wants to invest €10,000,000, are also intended to ensure that packaging paper is fully recyclable and durable.
