= Gobblet =

- Players: 2
- Setup time: < 5 minutes
- Playing time: < 20 minutes
- Chance: None
- Age range: 7 and up
- Skills: Strategic thought, Memory

Gobblet is a board game for two players designed by Thierry Denoual and published in 2001 by Gigamic and Blue Orange Games. Gobblet was a finalist for the 2004 Jeu de l'année.

The game is played on a 4×4 board. Each player has 12 pieces of the same colour but different sizes. Players take turns to place a piece on the board or move their piece that already is on the board. Bigger pieces can be placed so that they cover smaller ones. A player wins by placing four pieces of the same colour in a horizontal, vertical, or diagonal row.

In 2003, Gigamic and Blue Orange Games released Gobblet Junior, a version of the game for younger players, which is played on a 3×3 board.

In 2009, Blue Orange Games published revisioned editions: Gobblet X4 and Gobblet Gobblers to replace Gobblet and Gobblet Jr. accordingly.
