= Scan (card game) =

Card game published in 1987

Scan is a card game published in 1987 in North America by Parker Brothers that had been developed in Europe by Piatnik as Indiscretion.

== Contents ==
Scan (or Indiscretion) is a game in which a deck of playing cards has been modified so that the reverse of each card displays its suit. The deck of cards comes with the rules to two games: "Bonus-Malus" and "Rubbish Heap". Piatnik's version, Indiscretion also comes with ten extra games that were the winners of a game design competition.

== Publication history ==
In 1987, the German game designer Alexander Randolph designed a deck of cards with the suits visible on the reverse of the cards, and created rules for two card games. The Austrian games company Piatnik published the deck and the two games under the title Indiscretion in English- and German-language editions. Included with the game was the announcement of a competition for game ideas that used this deck, with the winner to receive $10,000.

Parker Brothers simultaneously published Randolph's card deck in North America under the title Scan.

Piatnik published a second German edition of Indiscretion in 1988 that included ten winning games from the previous year's competition. These ten new games were not included in the edition sold in the UK, and Games International received permission to publish five of them.

== Reception ==
Brian Walker reviewed Indiscretion for Games International, and gave it 4 stars out of 5, calling this "A first class game to go with a first class idea."

The Hungarian website Tarsasjatekok warned that although the game was easy to learn, "we recommend this game is only for ages 10 and up — gameplay relies heavily on alliances."

== Reviews ==
- Best Games of 1988 in Games #94

== Other recognition ==
Copies of Indiscretion are held in several German museums, including the Bavarian Games Archive (object 21.01.01.02), and the Alexander Randolph Schaudepot Collection at the Nuremberg State Museum.
