= Living Forest (board game) =

2021 game designed by Aske Christiansen

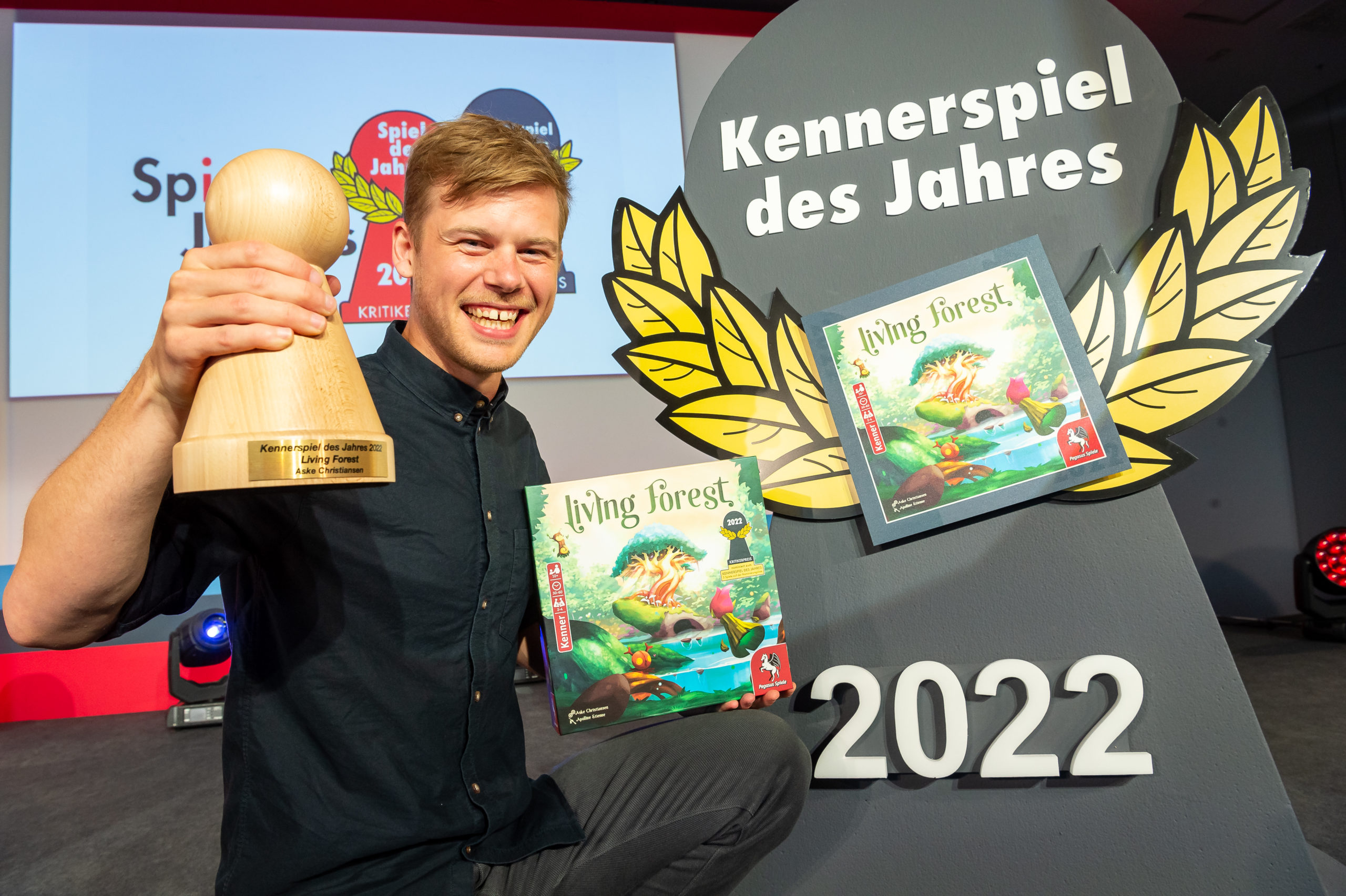
- Aske Christiansen
- Designers: Aske Christiansen
- Illustrators: Apolline Etienne
- Publication: 2021
- Players: 2-4
- Playing time: 40 minutes
- Website: www.ludonaute.fr/portfolio/living-forest/

Living Forest is a 2021 board game designed by Aske Christiansen and published by Ludonaute. It is a deck-building, tile placement game. Players aim to rescue forest trees from Onibi, a fictitious beast. Upon its release, Living Forest received positive reviews and won awards, including the 2022 Kennerspiel des Jahres and the As d'Or awards.

== Gameplay ==
Players act as Spirits of Nature to defend trees from being burnt by Onibi. Each turn is split into three phases, the guardian animal phase, the action phase, and attacks by Onibi. In the guardian phase, players draw guardian animal cards to form help lines using a push-your-luck mechanism. The action phase is split into actions that players may perform depending on the symbols on their help line, including gaining fragment tiles, attracting guardian animals, extinguishing a fire, moving on the Circle of Spirits board, or placing a protective tree. However, the strengths of the actions vary depending on symbols on guardian animal cards. For example, players may only extinguish fires for which they have fire symbols. After the action phase, the players have to take penalty cards to their own discard pile, a tree is attacked, and guardian animals are altered. Once a player reaches one of the game thresholds, including planting 12 trees, extinguishing 12 fires or gaining 12 flower symbols, the player ending the game wins.

== Reception ==
Living Forest received positive reviews. Matt Thrower from GamesRadar complimented the engagement, replayability, component quality, and dynamism, and the combination of mechanics, including deck-building, push-your-luck, and tile placement. However, he was critical of its scalability, especially for the lack of movement actions for two players, unbalanced victory conditions, and complexity, stating that it was "a bit lightweight for the hobby crowd seeking board games for adults" but also had "a few too many bells and whistles for mainstream success".

Chad Wilkinson from Tabletop Gaming recommended the game, and praised the mixture of mechanisms, replayability, player interaction, and component quality, but critiqued the setup time.

The game received numerous awards, including the 2022 Kennerspiel des Jahres. The jury praised the interaction, engagement, and replayability, stating that "[there] are three key factors to the thrill and attraction of 'Living Forest': the exciting race to twelve points, the risky gamble of when to stop revealing cards and the high level of interaction with your opponents. The three different victory conditions are especially motivating, ensuring a high level of replayability and a different dynamic to each new game". Living Forest also received the 2022 As d'Or Insider award.
