= Gumshoe: The Hard-Boiled Detective in the Thirties =

1985 tabletop game

Gumshoe: The Hard-Boiled Detective in the Thirties is a 1985 tabletop game published by Sleuth Publications.

== Gameplay ==
Gumshoe: The Hard-Boiled Detective in the Thirties is a game in which the players are operatives of the Continental Detective Agency in the foggy streets of 1930s San Francisco. Set across a fictional week, each game day opens with a new mystery drawn from corrupt cops, jazz-club murders, vanished heirs, and frame-ups with red herrings. Each morning, players decide their next move across the city's labyrinthine geography, consulting numbered clues, poring over fingerprint reports, newspaper clippings, autopsy results, and phone directories. Branching clues can spiral into car chases or stakeouts, and everything consumes precious in-game time tracked on a daily pad. While inner-city travel takes no time, reaching the foggy outskirts costs hours, demanding forethought and tactical movement. There is no scoring system—only intuition and judgment. Players must decide when it is time to attempt to solve a case, guided by an optional question book that sometimes slips in spoilers.

== Publication history ==
Shannon Appelcline stated that Sleuth Publications had previously published Sherlock Holmes: Consulting Detective, which "won the SdJ (Game of the Year) award in Germany in 1985 - the same year that Sleuth published Gumshoe (1985), which took the game's ideas to San Francisco in the 1930s."

== Reception ==
Peter England reviewed Gumshoe for Adventurer magazine and stated that "To conclude, although Gumshoe was designed to be played by several people, it makes an excellent solo game. The game is a brilliant concept, and outdoes any solo games that I have previously played. Sleuth are definitely onto a good thing with this one; the contents are well-produced, and there is so much in the box that you really get value for money. It is well-designed and very playable, and most cases can keep you occupied for hours. Gumshoe manages to capture all the thrills and adventure of 1930's America, and even rises above their previous amazing game, Consulting Detective. So when it arrives in the shops and you want something to keep you occupied for a long time, and is value for money, rush out and buy Gumshoe..."

J. Michael Caparula reviewed Gumshoe: The Hard-Boiled Detective in the Thirties for Different Worlds magazine and stated that "If you're an armchair detective that loves the Hammett thrillers, if you've just finished your umpteenth viewing of The Maltese Falcon, here at last is a game for you."

== Reviews ==
- 1985 Games 100 in Games
- 1986 Games 100 in Games
