= Medina (board game) =

Medina is a board game designed by Stefan Dorra and published by Hans im Glück and Rio Grande Games in 2001. In the game, three or four players compete to be the most influential developer of Medina, a desert city near the Atlas Mountains in 1822. Variations of the game allow 2 or 5 players. The game was nominated for the 2001 Deutscher Spiele Preis and the 2003 Jeu de l'année, but won neither prize.

== Game play ==
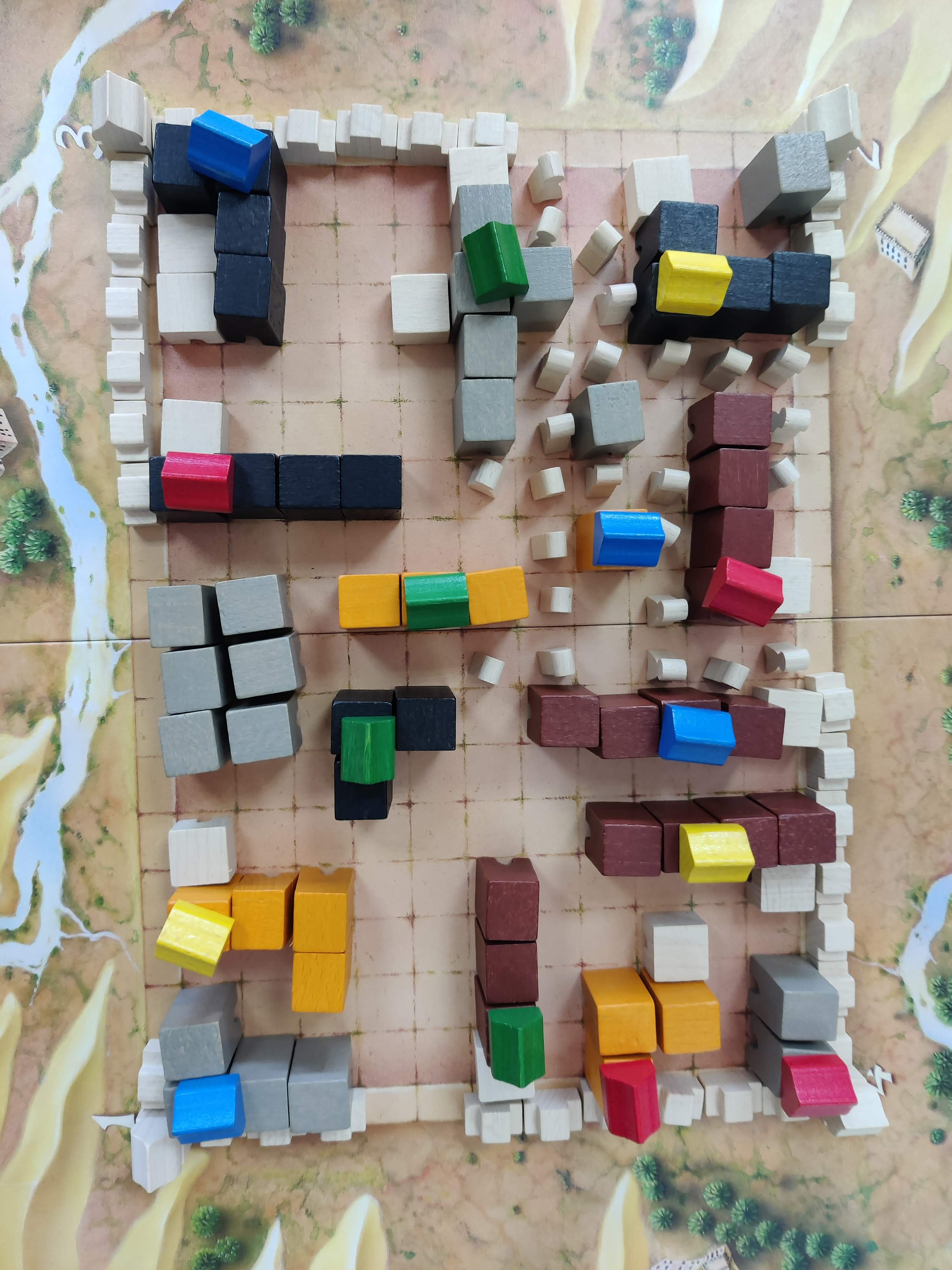
Finished game

The gameboard is a 16 by 11 grid of squares representing the city. Each edge is lined by rectangles where the wall of the city is to be built and each corner is labelled with one of the numbers one through four. In a four-player game, each player receives 5 building pieces in each of four colors, 3 stable pieces, 6 inhabitant pieces, 8 wall pieces, and 4 dome pieces. Only the dome pieces correspond to the proprietary color of the player. At each turn, players place two pieces on the board; the game ends when no player can make a legal play, at which time the player with the most points is declared the winner.

Building places may be placed on any open space on the board. However, if a building already exists on the board, other pieces of that color must be attached, unless a player has claimed that building as their own by topping it with their dome. Distinct buildings cannot be built such that they touch each other in any way. Each player scores one point for each building piece in each of their buildings and a bonus of one to four points for having the largest building in any given color. Players can have only one building in each color.

Stables may be added to any building on the board including a building already topped by dome. Stables count for scoring as if they were a building section in all ways, including determining the largest building in a color.

The first inhabitant may be placed anywhere on the board. Thereafter, inhabitants must be built in a continuous line with no branches or loops. A player scores one point for each inhabitant bordering a building they have claimed.

The wall sections may be placed in wall spaces in a straight, uninterrupted line originating from any corner. Each wall section touching a building earns the owner of that building one point. Furthermore, the last player to touch a sequence of wall pieces with one of their buildings earns a number of points equal to the value of the corner that the wall originates.

Players may only pass if they have no legal moves, meaning that moves benefiting other players must be made if no other legal moves exist. The score is tallied at the end, meaning that intermediate ownership of wall bonuses or building size bonuses have no bearing on the final score.
