= San Marco (board game) =

- The box cover of San Marco
- Designers: Alan R. Moon; Aaron Weissblum
- Publishers: Ravensburger
- Players: 3 to 4
- Age range: 10 and up

San Marco is a 2001 designer board game by Alan R. Moon and Aaron Weissblum. The game is set in Venice, and the title comes from the name of one of the city's districts. There are six districts across which players vie for influence. The games uses area control and card drafting as game mechanics. The game is divided into passages, which are then broken down into turns. Players can place and move both aristocrats and bridges, and score points for areas in which they have influence.

== Awards and rankings ==
- Winner, Meeples' Choice Award 2001
- Winner, International Gamers Award 2002 for "Best multiplayer strategy game"
- 7th Place, Deutscher Spiele Preis, 2001
- Finalist, Jeu de l'année awards, 2003
