= The Mansion Murders =

The Mansion Murders is a 1983 supplement for Sherlock Holmes: Consulting Detective published by Sleuth Publications.

== Gameplay ==
The Mansion Murders includes five additional mysteries for Sherlock Holmes Consulting Detective.

== Reception ==
Nic Grecas reviewed Sherlock Holmes: Consulting Detective for White Dwarf #55, giving it an overall rating of 9 out of 10, and stated that "Mansion Murders gives you a further five cases to solve - all of which are of the same infuriating baffling standard as those in CD".

William A. Barton reviewed The Mansion Murders in Space Gamer No. 71. Barton commented that "The Mansion Murders upholds SHCD's reputation as the best of the Sherlockian/mystery games currently on the market. After these cases, I can hardly wait for the next set."

== Reviews ==
- Jeux & Stratégie #40 (as "Meurtres à Carlton House")
- Analog Science Fiction and Fact
