= Peri Spiele =

Austrian board game publisher

Peri Spiele was an Austrian board game, card game and playing card manufacturer based in Scharnstein in Upper Austria.

== History ==
The firm was founded in 1959 by Erich Perner. Later his son Wolfgang Perner became managing director. In 1984, a branch office was established in Switzerland in Goldach as PPG Perner Publishing Group. In 1995, Peri employed a total of 73 people. In February 1996, Peri had to file for bankruptcy and, in the same year, Wolfgang Perner founded Perner Produktions and so was able to continue with the brand of Peri Spiele. In 2004, the 28-man firm of Perner Produktions finally went into bankruptcy.

== Games ==
Several games were candidates for the coveted Spiel des Jahres awards:

- 1991: Invers by Kris Burm
- 1993: Zatre by Manfred Schüling
- 1993: Pusher by Werner Falkhof

Two games received the French award of the Super Golden Ace:

- 1994: Pusher by Werner Falkhof
- 1998: Zatre by Manfred Schüling

Special games:

- Kennen sie Traxenbichl? ("Do You Know Traxenbichl", a place name quiz named after a place near Scharnstein)
- DKT – Das kaufmännische Talent
- Triomino
- Rummy (Rummikub)
