= Pylos (board game) =

Pylos (UK: /ˈpaɪlɒs/, US: /ˈpaɪloʊs/, or sometimes /ˈpɪlɒs/) is a board game invented by David G. Royffe and published by Gigamic. Royffe first conceived the game in 1964 using his family’s snooker balls. He took his idea to the 1994 Essen game fair in Germany. At that time, the game was called Elevation, but this was changed to Pyraos when it was published by Gigamic, and later to Pylos.

== Gameplay ==
Each player starts off with 15 balls. Players take turns taking pieces from their reserve pile, and placing them on a 4x4 game board made up of 16 indentations. When four pieces are placed next to each other in a square, one piece can be put on top of the square. If the square is completed with all the same color, the player of that color may take one or two of their own pieces from the board (one or two that are not supporting anything) and put it back into their reserve pile. At the end of the game, the game board should have 4 levels. The first level with 16 pieces, the second level with 9 pieces, the third level with 4 pieces, and the fourth level with 1 piece. A player wins if they put the last piece on the 4th level, or if the other player runs out of pieces to play.

== Variations ==
A children’s version of the game is played in the same way but excludes the rule where a player can recover their pieces.

== Gallery ==
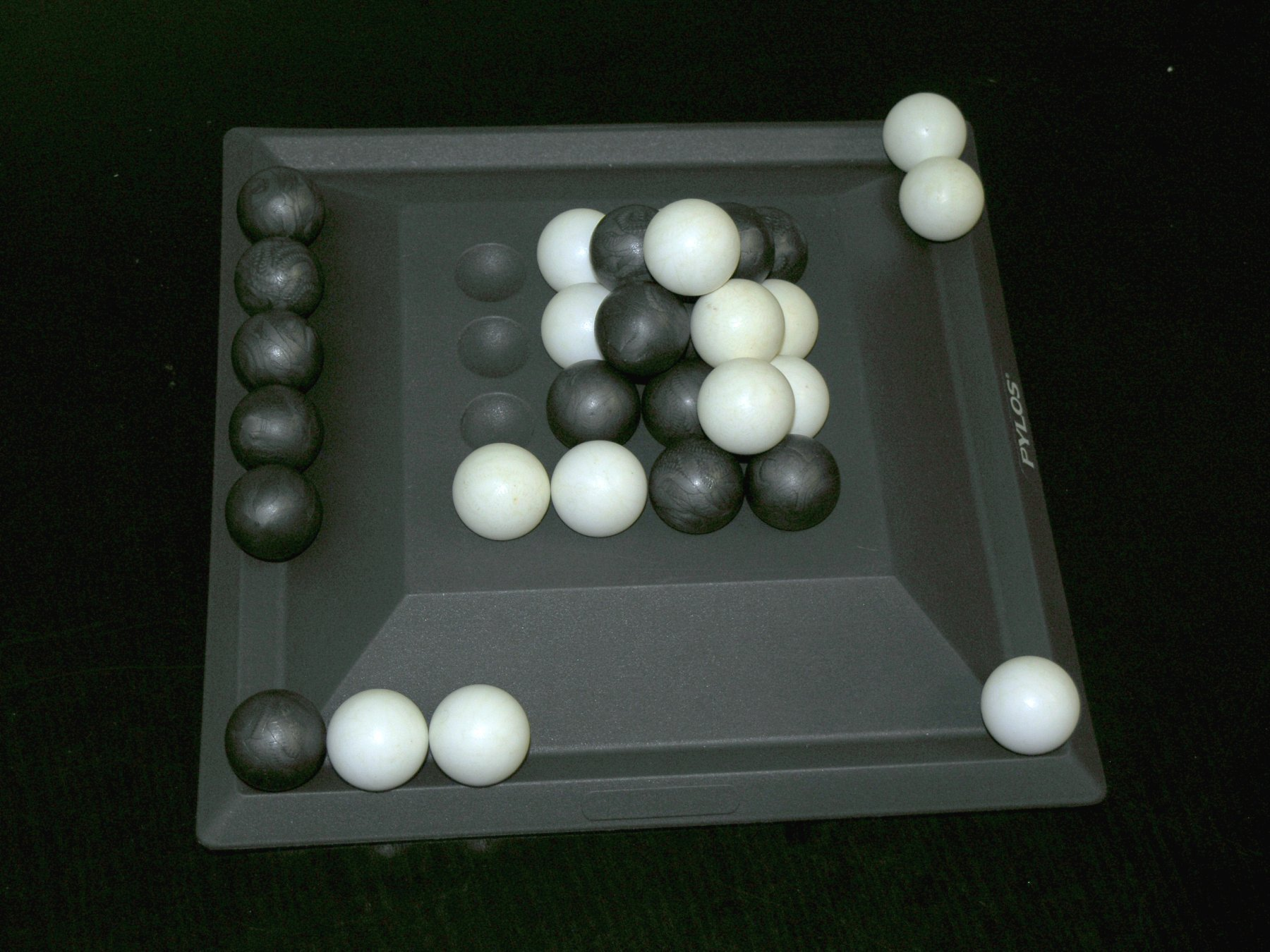
Pylos

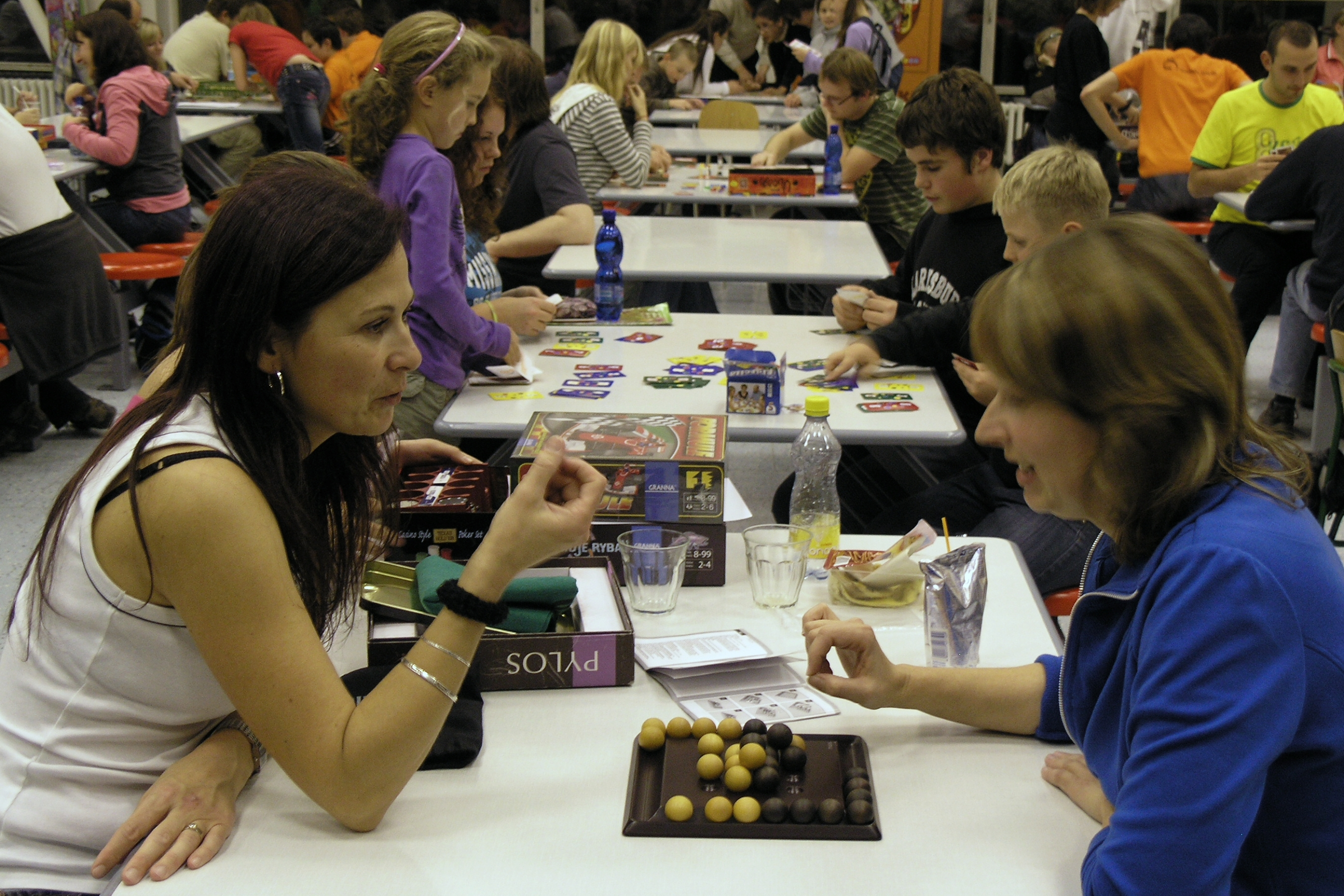
GOADA 2009 - Pylos 082-1

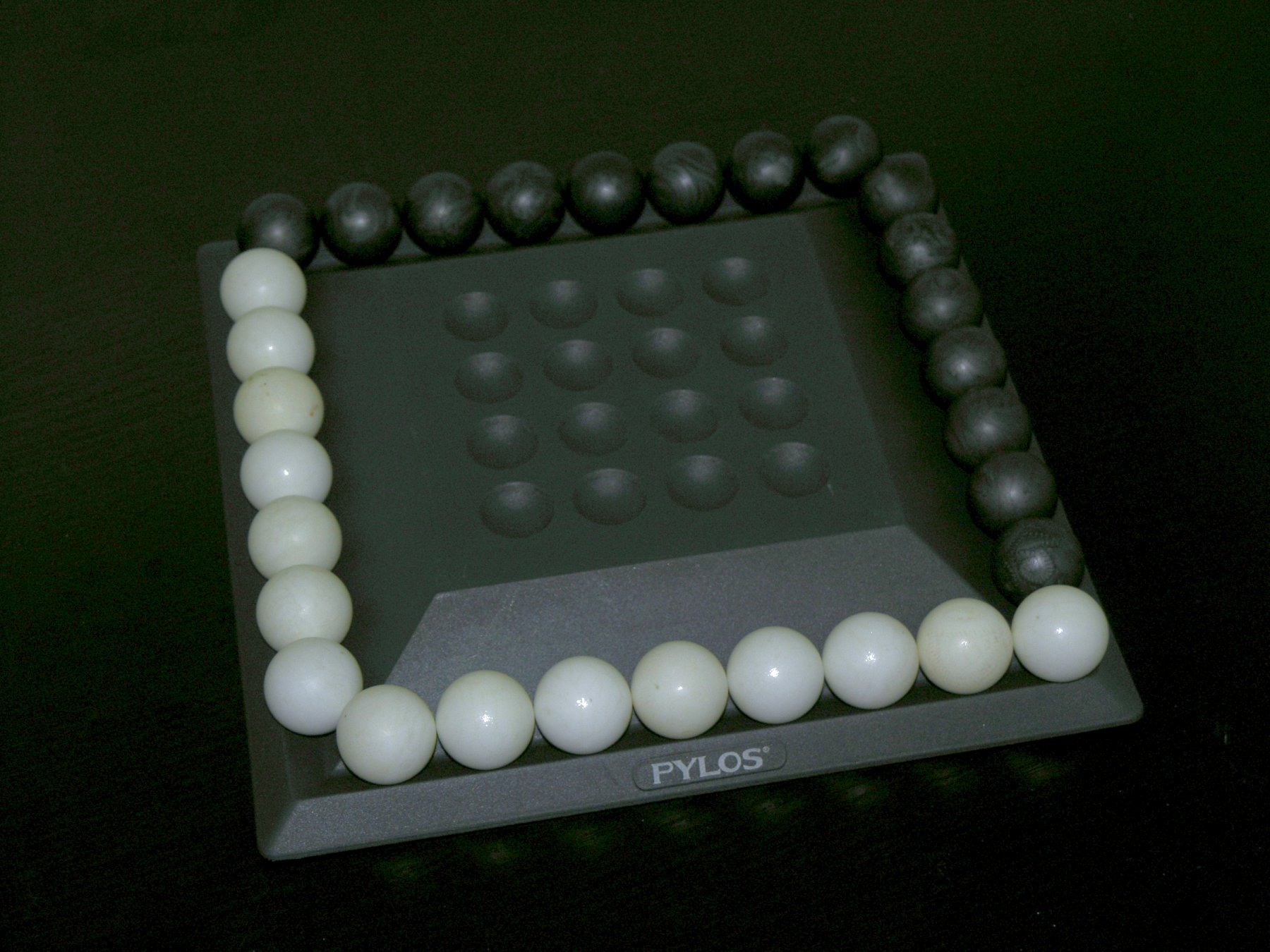
Pylos 1
