= Ferdinand Piatnik =

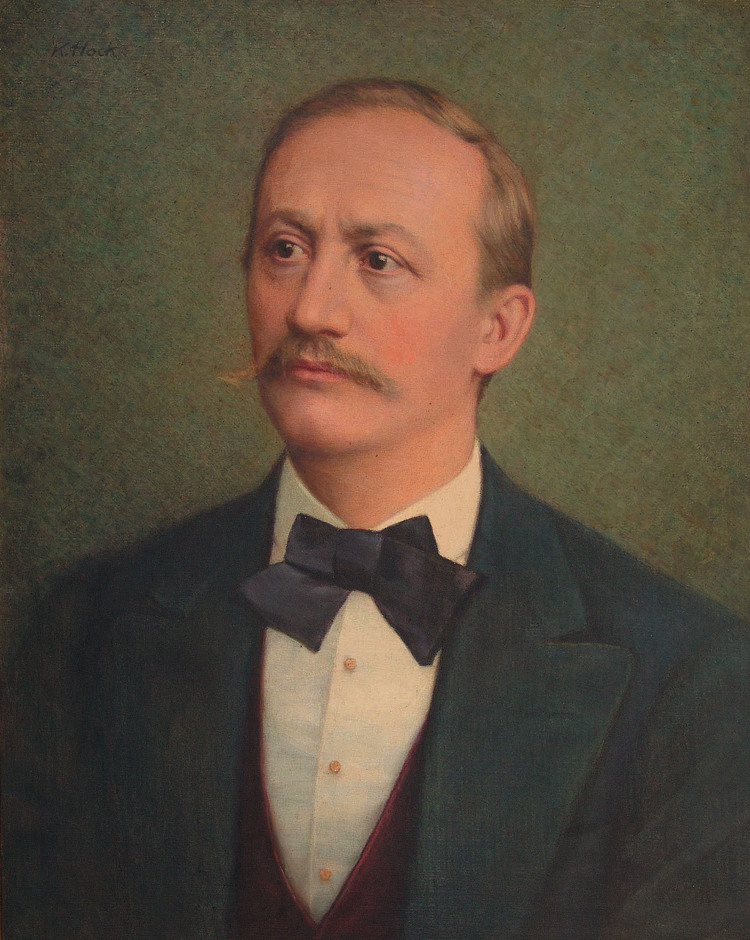
- Born: 14 October 1819; Buda, Austria-Hungary
- Died: 20 July 1885 (aged 65); Bad Vöslau, Austria-Hungary
- Citizenship: Austro-Hungarian
- Occupation: card painter
- Known for: founder of Piatnik & Söhne
- Spouses: Josefa Hohninger, Johanna Grech
- Children: Ferdinand; Adolf; Rudolf Paul
- Parents: Ferdinand Ignaz Piatnik (father); Josefa Reuchnecker (mother)

Ferdinand Piatnik (14 October 1819 – 20 July 1885) was an Austrian card painter, manufacturer, business magnate, philanthropist and the founder of Piatnik & Söhne.

== Life ==
Born at Buda, Kingdom of Hungary (now Budapest, Hungary), he was educated in Pozsony (now Bratislava, Slovakia). He bought an Austrian card company from Anton Moser in 1843 and made it to one of the most successful game manufacturing companies in the world. He later married the widow of Anton Moser. After his three sons – Ferdinand, Adolf and Rudolf Paul – entered the company in 1882 it was renamed Ferdinand Piatnik & Söhne.

He died in Bad Vöslau.
