= The Queen's Park Affair =

1984 role-playing supplement

The Queen's Park Affair is a supplement published by Sleuth Publications in 1984 for the detective game Sherlock Holmes: Consulting Detective, itself based on the Sherlock Holmes detective stories by Arthur Conan Doyle.

== Description ==
The Queen's Park Affair is a large-scale scenario in which the players have four days to investigate the mysterious disappearance of sports reporter Franklin Kearney in Victorian London.

The supplement comes with a booklet containing an introduction to the game and the basics of the investigation, as well as a detailed map of Queen's Park, a newspaper archive, a tracking folder, a pad of schedule sheets, a puzzle booklet, and an envelope containing several clues to start the game that include letters, newspaper cuttings, business cards, ticket stubs and receipts.

Unlike the original game, which had one mystery to be solved immediately, The Queen's Park Affair takes place over five days in 1888.

The original release did not contain a solution — players mailed in their own solutions, and the person judged to have solved the case most like Sherlock Holmes received a prize of $10,000. After the contest ended on 15 January 1985, subsequent printings contained the solution.

== Reception ==
In Issue 74 of Space Gamer, Caroline Chase reviewed the edition containing the detective contest, and was not pleased about the promotional aspect and the lack of a definitive solution, saying, "Queen's Park Affair is different from previous SHCD adventures – no solution to the crime is given! Rather, this supplement has been sold as a competition – the person who solved the crime 'in the manner most like Holmes' wins $5,000. Pretty nifty as a promotional gimmick, but it left me feeling that this was a bit of a ripoff."

In Issue 47 of the French magazine Jeux & Stratégie, Alain Ledoux liked all of the printed extras, and commented "we should always first look at the material provided, because, as with each volume of Consulting Detective, these extras deserve a detour." Ledoux noted that "The rules remain the same as for Consulting Detective with some modifications regarding the passage of time and simplified travel for this investigation."

In Issue 12 of the UK magazine Games International, Kevin W. Jacklin warned that this supplement was a step above the original game in complexity and commented, "I would not recommend The Queen’s Park Affair to the novice (I replay it from time to time and still make the same mistakes!)."

== Reviews ==
- Casus Belli #41
- Game News #10 (Dec., 1985)
