= La Famiglia: The Great Mafia War =

German historical board game

La Famiglia
The Great Mafia War
- Designers: Maximilian Maria Thiel
- Publishers: Boardgame Atelier
- Players: 4
- Website: boardgameatelier.de/en/games/la-famiglia

La Famiglia: The Great Mafia War is a German board game designed by Maximilian Maria Thiel, and published by Boardgame Atelier, which has described it as "a conflict game set against the backdrop of a mafia feud in Sicily".

The game is based upon the mafia wars in Sicily in the 1980s, being specifically inspired by the battle waged by the Corleonesi in which they asserted their control over Cosa Nostra, resulting in the death of over 1,000 people between 1981 and 1983. During this war the clan, led by Salvatore Riina, killed the heads of rival clans, usually via death squads who gunned down their victims on motorbikes with Kalashnikovs. The game was subject to controversy after it began distribution in Italy in 2025 when the sister of the murdered anti-mafia judge Giovanni Falcone, Maria Falcone, spoke out against it.

== Gameplay ==
In La Famiglia, up to four players represent the heads of various mob families in Sicily's mafia Cosa Nostra. They move pieces around a map of Sicily, competing against each other to take control of the island and dominate as many of its regions as they can. This is done through varuous actions such as setting up drug labs, using car bombs, murdering each others' 'soldati', and forging alliances. Players can use speedboats to move quickly around the island. Individuals in the game are represented using abstract blocks rather than figures.

== Responses ==
La Famiglia won the As d'Or award in 2024.

=== Italian mafia controversy ===
In late 2024 or early 2025, the game was translated into Italian and began distributing to online retail sites in Italy. In January 2025, Maria Falcone, the sister of the murdered anti-mafia judge Giovanni Falcone who had been ordered to be killed via car bomb alongside Paolo Borsellino by Sicilian Mafia boss Totò Riina, responded to the game's distribution. She said to the Corriere della Sera newspaper, "I don’t understand how it is possible that someone thought of this game, which plays with the feelings of those who have lost their lives serving the state. The mafia has only created death in Sicily and Italy. A game like this offends the memory of all those who contributed to freeing this land [of organised crime]." Echoing this, Forza Italia politician Alessandro De Leo wrote to Sicily's president Renato Schifani that "This product not only offends the dignity of Sicilians but devalues the daily commitment of millions of citizens who fight for legality and justice in our region." He also put forward that it turned "car bombs into simple elements in a game", and thus called for a ban on sales of the game in the region.

Responding to the criticism, Thiel, who had lived in Italy at about the time of the Falcone and Borsellino murders in 1992, wrote that he was "very sorry if anyone feels hurt or offended by this game. This was not our intention. In this game, only mobsters kill each other. So I don’t see the problem – apart from the theme, which for some seems to be a trigger. In addition, the game is deliberately kept very abstract [blocks instead of figures] so that these murders are not made conscious in the game." He wrote further that Falcone and Borsellino were killed 10 years after the mafia feud ended, and that their murders and the murders of others by the mafia had "nothing to do with the internal mafia war depicted in the game."
