= Matagot =

Mythical creature from southern French oral tradition

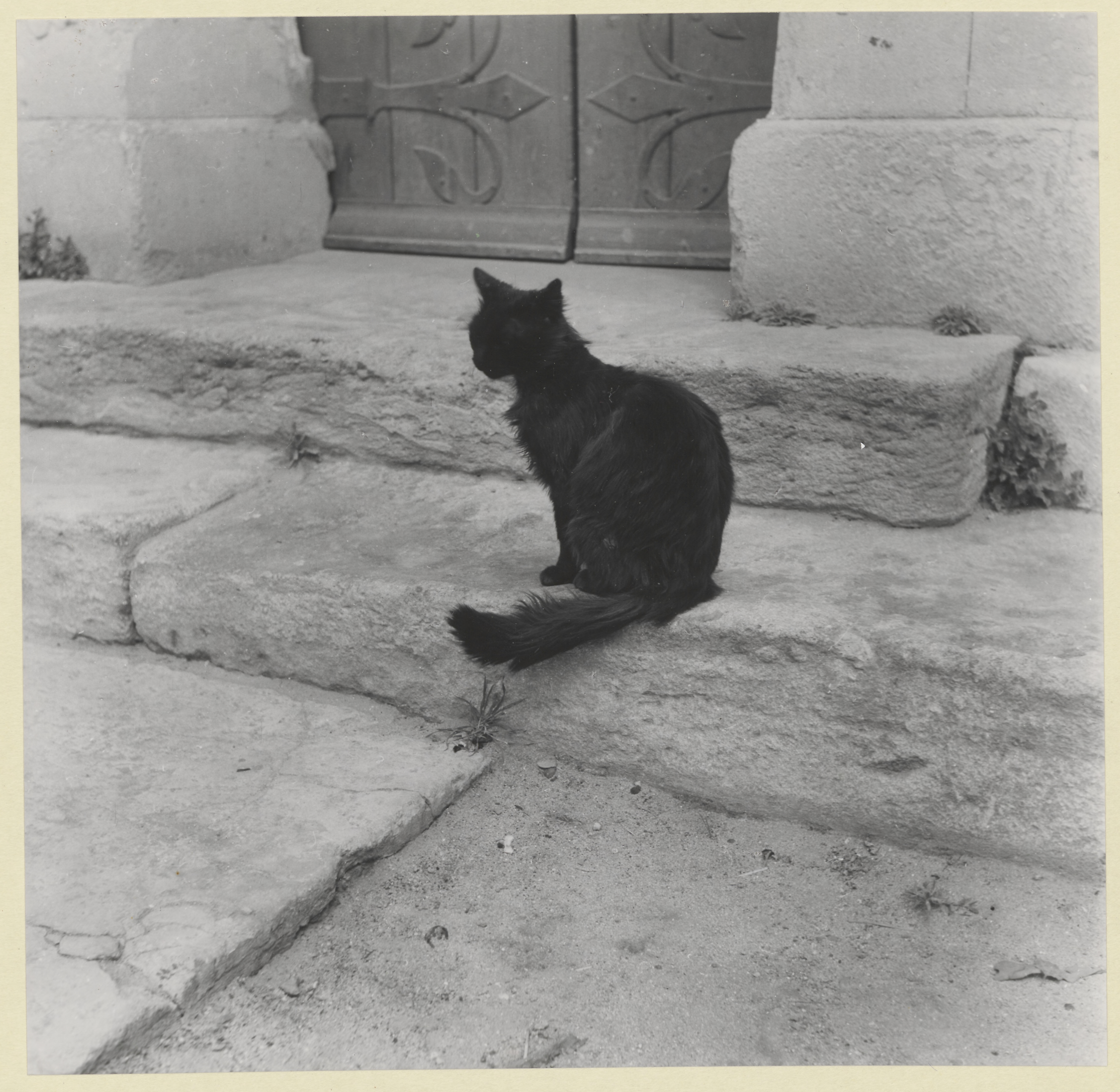
- A matagot does not look any different from a regular black cat

Origin
- Country: France

A Matagot is a spirit in French folklore that tends to take the form of a black cat. The name "Matagot" comes from the Spanish mater (to kill) and gothos (goths).

== Description and folklore ==
Matagots are generally evil, but some may prove helpful, like the "magician cat" said to bring wealth into a home if it is well fed. Traditionally, a wealth-bringing matagot must be lured with a fresh, plump chicken, then carried home by its new owner without the human looking back. If the cat is given the first mouthful of food and drink at every meal and otherwise treated well, it will bring the human good fortune. A matagot is said to be able to serve up to nine masters at once. In Gascony traditions, you must not keep the matagot all your life: if the owner is dying, they will suffer a long agony, as long as they don't free the matagot.

A matagot looks like a regular black cat, so it is considered good faith to treat black cats well.

The cat from Dick Whittington and His Cat has been described as a matagot, as she brought Whittington great fortune.

== Popular culture ==
Matagot is also the name of an independent French board game publisher best known for Takenoko and Captain Sonar. The company frequently makes use of black cats in their branding.

In Fantastic Beasts: The Crimes of Grindelwald the matagot is a hairless, black, cat-like creature with the ability to multiply at will.

== See also ==
- Cash coins in feng shui
- Sailors' superstitions
- Touch piece
