= Orange–blue coalition =

An orange–blue coalition (French: Coalition orange-bleue Dutch: Oranje-blauw coalitie) is a type of governing coalition in Belgian politics that brings together Liberal parties (MR and OpenVLD, who traditionally use the color blue) and Christian democratic/humanist political parties (cdH and CD&V, who traditionally use the color orange). These coalitions are also termed Blue–Roman (French: Bleue-romaine, Dutch: Rooms-blauw), corresponding to the colors of the liberal parties, and the Roman of the Roman Catholic Church for the Christian Democrats.

== History ==
While the term originated after the 2007 Belgian federal election to designate the proposed federal coalition between christian democrats and liberals, several Belgian government coalitions correspond with this definition. In fact, the first coalition government in Belgian history following the Belgian Revolution were composed of Catholics and Liberals. This coalition was known in the 19th century as the Unionist coalition, as it represented a union of the Catholics and Liberals against the Netherlands. From the 1860s onward, Belgium had majority governments consisting of either the Liberal Party or the Catholic Party.

It wasn't until the Interwar period that the Catholic-Liberal coalition formed a coalition government together again. At the time, it was the only viable majority coalition to prevent the Belgian Labour Party from forming government. Between World War II and the 1980s, government coalitions alternated between those formed by the Orange-Blue coalition, and those formed by the Parti Socialiste/Socialistische Partij Anders.

Since the end of the 1980s, these types of coalitions are almost never seen in Belgian politics. An exception occurred before the 2019 Belgian federal election, when the Michel II Government used the coalition prior to the election.

=== Federal Government ===
- 1831 : de Gerlache (Catholiques-Libéraux)
- 1831 : Lebeau I (Catholiques-Libéraux)
- 1831–1832 : de Muelenaere (Catholiques-Libéraux)
- 1832–1834 : Goblet (Catholiques-Libéraux)
- 1834–1840 : de Theux I (Catholiques-Libéraux)
- 1841–1845 : Nothomb (Catholiques-Libéraux)
- 1845–1846 : Van de Weyer (Catholiques-Libéraux)
- 1855–1857 : De Decker (Catholiques-Parti libéral)
- 1921–1925 : Theunis I (Parti catholique-Parti libéral)
- 1927–1931 : Jaspar II (Parti catholique-Parti libéral)
- 1931–1932 : Renkin (Parti catholique-Parti libéral)
- 1932–1934 : de Broqueville III (Parti catholique-Parti libéral)
- 1934–1935 : Theunis II (Parti catholique-Parti libéral)
- 1939 : Pierlot II (Parti catholique-Parti libéral)
- 1949–1950 : Gaston Eyskens I (CVP-PSC-Parti libéral)
- 1958–1960 : Gaston Eyskens III (CVP-PSC-Parti libéral)
- 1960–1961 : Gaston Eyskens III (remanié) (CVP-PSC-Parti libéral)
- 1966–1968 : Vanden Boeynants I (CVP-PSC-PLP-PVV)
- 1974 : Tindemans I (PSC-CVP-PLP-PVV)
- 1977 : Tindemans III (PSC-CVP-PLP-PVV)
- 1981–1985 : Martens V (PSC-CVP-PRL-PVV)
- 1985–1987 : Martens VI (PSC-CVP-PRL-PVV)
- 1987–1988 : Martens VII (PSC-CVP-PRL-PVV)
- 2018– : Michel II (MR-CD&V-Open Vld)

=== Flemish Government ===
- 1985–1988 : Geens II (CVP-PVV)
- 1988 : Geens III (CVP-PVV)

=== Walloon Government ===
- 1985–1988 : Wathelet (PSC-PRL)
- 2017–2019 : Borsus (MR-cdH)

=== German Community Government ===
- 1986–1990 : Maraite I (CSP-PFF)

== See also ==
- 2007–08 Belgian government formation
- Verhofstadt III Government
- 2007 Belgian federal election
- Federal Government of Belgium
- 2010–2011 Belgian government formation
- Second Merkel cabinet, an equivalent coalition government in (Germany)
