= Quarto (board game) =

Two-player board game

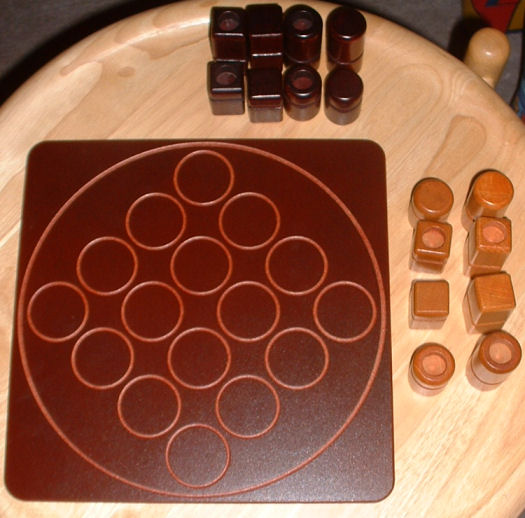
Quarto board at start of game

Quarto is a board game for two players invented by Swiss mathematician Blaise Muller. It is published and copyrighted by Gigamic.

The game is played on a 4×4 board. There are 16 unique pieces to play with, each of which is either:

- tall or short;
- red or blue (or a different pair of colors, e.g. light- or dark-stained wood);
- square or circular; and
- hollow-top or solid-top.

Players take turns choosing a piece which the other player must then place on the board. A player wins by placing a piece on the board which forms a horizontal, vertical, or diagonal row of four pieces, all of which have a common attribute (all short, all circular, etc.). A variant rule included in many editions gives a second way to win by placing four matching pieces in a 2×2 square.

Quarto is distinctive in that there is only one set of common pieces, rather than a set for one player and a different set for the other. It is therefore an impartial game.

== Analysis ==
In 1998 Luc Goossens solved the game (i.e., showed what must occur if both players play perfectly) via computer and found neither player can force a win. He also determined that the earliest winning move (in case the opponent did not play perfectly) can be made when placing the fifth piece and choosing a sixth. The solve was corroborated again in 2026.

== Awards ==
- Dé d’Or des Créateurs de Jeux 1989 – Paris, France
- Oscar du Jouet – Toy Oscar 1992 – Paris, France
- Jouet de l'année – Game of the Year 1992 – Brussels
- Super As d'Or Festival International des Jeux – Super Golden Ace 1992 – Cannes, France
- Toy Award 1992 – Benelux
- Spiel des Jahres – Game of the Year 1993 nominee – Germany
- Gioco Dell'anno – Game of the Year 1993 – Italy
- Speelgoed Vant Jaar – Game of the year 1993 – Netherlands
- Mensa Select Top 5 Best Games 1993 – US
- Parent's Choice Gold Award 1993 – US
- Best Bet of the Canadian Toy Testing Council 1994 – Canada
- Prix d'Excellence des Consommateurs – Consumer's Toy Award 1994 – Quebec, Canada
- Games Magazine "Games 100 Selection" 1995 – US
- Games Magazine "Games 100 Selection" 1996 – US
- Games Magazine "Games 100 Selection" 1997 – US
- Game of the Year 2004 – Finland
- Parent's Choice Top 25 games in 25 years 2004 – US
