= Blue Orange Games =

American board game company

- Company type: Private
- Industry: Board game publishing
- Founded: 1999
- Founders: Thierry Denoual; Julien Mayot
- Headquarters: San Francisco, California, United States
- Products: Board games
- Website: www.blueorangegames.com

Blue Orange Games is a board game company based in San Francisco, California. They have been publishing and promoting award-winning games for over 18 years. The company was founded in 1999 by Thierry Denoual and Juilen Mayot. The company is known to use recyclable materials in its games. It has won numerous awards.

== History ==
The first Blue Orange Game to be designed was Gobblet. The creators were hit with a flash of inspiration for the game while in a coffee shop in California. This game was an instant success all over the US and helped build up the company. A San Francisco Chronicle review prompted the game to sell out locally. Co-founder Mayot took a three-month road trip across the country, covering 22,000 miles and visiting 500 stores with a jeep packed with 1,000 Gobblet games. The trip and the subsequent 10,000 games sale marked the official start of the business.

The name Blue Orange Games comes from a poem by Paul Eluard titled The Earth is Blue Like an Orange. The company is known for its tree planting campaign and commitment to environmental responsibility. The games are typically made out of wood, tin, resin and recycled or recyclable materials. Blue Orange Games released the best-selling game, Spot It!, in 2010, and it has since maintained its position in the top 100 of the toys & games category on Amazon.com. Spot it! is now available in many different editions and has a Major League Baseball license and a National Hockey League license.

Part of the company's philosophy is a belief in the social and developmental benefits of playing offline games instead of spending time engaged with electronic devices.

== Blue Orange groups ==
Blue Orange has 3 main divisions:

- Blue Orange Edition (France), the engineering/consulting firm of the group. Three project managers of Blue Orange Edition "look for the playful pearls of tomorrow". They are connected with the authors of games around the world and test more than 1,000 games a year.
- Blue Orange Games (United States), the distributor of Blue Orange's games in the United States, Canada, Australia and New Zealand.
- Blue Orange Europe (France), which approves, validates and distributes Blue Orange's games in the rest of the world.

Blue Orange's games are sold on 5 continents and in 59 different countries.

== Products ==
Blue Orange Games products include:

- Gobblet
- Gobblet Gobblers
- Pengoloo
- Tell Tale
- Fastrack
- Double Shutter
- Yamslam
- Go Go Gelatos
- Bluff You
- Bendomino
- Dr. Eureka
- Zimmbos
- Dr. Microbe
- Brix
- Photosynthesis
- Kingdomino
- Fantastic Park
- Vikings on Board
- Bao Bab
- Sushi Draft
- Battle Sheep
