= Photosynthesis (board game) =

Nature-themed strategy board game

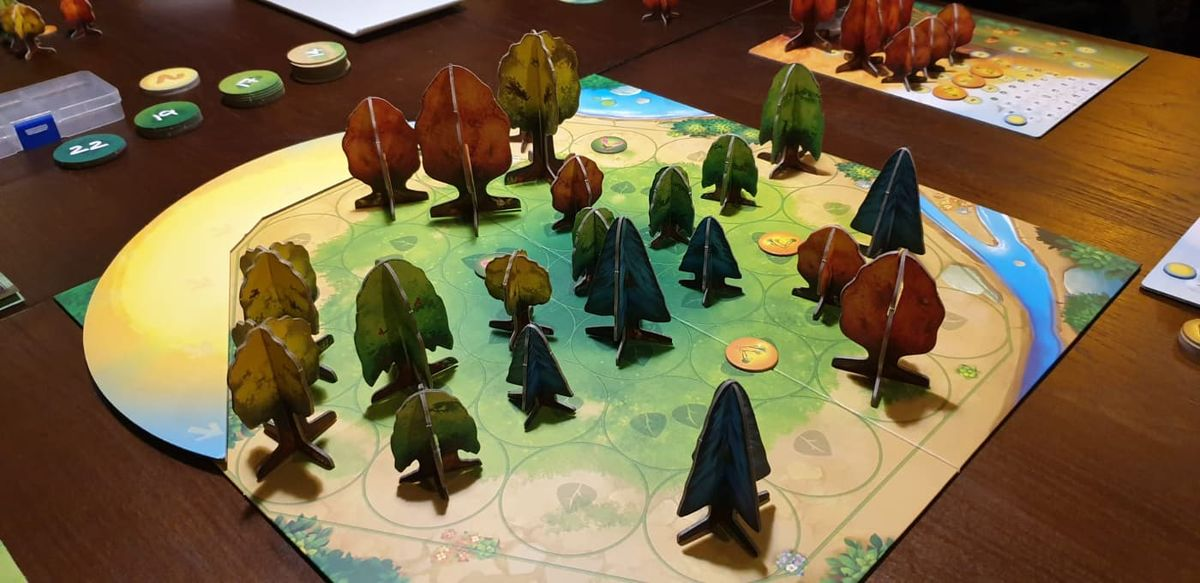
- Designers: Hjalmar Hach
- Illustrators: Sabrina Miramon
- Publishers: Blue Orange
- Publication: 2017; 9 years ago
- Players: 2 to 4
- Playing time: 45 minutes
- Age range: 8+
- Website: Official website

Photosynthesis is a strategy board game designed by Hjalmar Hach and published by Blue Orange in 2017.

== Gameplay ==
There are four differently-coloured player boards (blue, green, orange, and yellow) with similarly-coloured trees of three different sizes (small, medium, and large) and seed tokens. Each player takes a board of one colour, the tokens and trees of that colour, a light token used to track that player's light collection on their board, and a round marker. The player board has spaces for 4 seedlings, 4 small trees, 3 medium trees, and 2 large trees.

A collective game board is placed centrally and paired with a crescent-shaped board that represents the sun, a number of coin-shaped tokens represent victory points, and a token represents the starting player. Setup is completed once each player places the light token on the zero marker of their game board and two trees on the outer edge of the central game board. The game then proceeds in rounds, each with two phases.

In the Photosynthesis Phase, the sun rotates around the outer edge of the central board each turn, casting light on a row of spaces (indicated by arrows on the sun board). Trees in that row collect light (1 unit for small trees, 2 units for medium trees, and 3 units for large trees); this is adjusted by subtracting units as a result of trees occurring earlier in the row casting shadows. The light accumulated from this process is recorded on the player board with the light token. It represents the currency of the game.

In the Life Cycle Phase, the accumulated light is spent on growing trees, the cost of which is indicated on the associated spaces on the player board. Paying the cost allows the player to move the object to the ready area of their game board, which indicates further costs to pay in order to move the object to the central game board. A player may also cut down a large tree on the central board for a cost of 4 light to obtain a victory point token with a value dependent on its placement on the board. Trees closer to the centre of the board earn a greater number of points.

Play continues until the sun has made 3 or 4 full rotations about the central board (determined at the beginning of the game). Players then tally the value of their victory point tokens, and the winner is the player with the greatest tally.

== Expansion ==
The expansion set Photosynthesis: Under the Moonlight was released in 2020. It contained three modules (Great Elder Tree, Moon and Forest Animals, and Moonstones) that could be used as an independent game or integrated with the original game. It added a crescent-shaped board to represent the moon, rotated about the main game board in the opposite direction of the sun board. This enables players to collect moon rays that are used by a chosen animal; each animal performs a specific action, such as a hedgehog that plants additional seeds, or a fox that moves seeds or steals them from other players.

== Analysis ==
Players must consider a number of factors to determine when to harvest their trees. Only large trees may be harvested, and these collect the greatest number of light and cast the greatest shadow on other trees, thus reducing the opponent's collection of light and the opportunity for their trees to grow.

== Reception ==
In a review for Meeple Mountain, David McMillan stated that Photosynthesis is "just a beautiful game" with unique mechanics. Regarding a player's strategy, he said that "you can always count on someone else screwing it all up".

Matt Thrower, in a review for T3, said that Photosynthesis is an "easy-to-learn, great-looking game" but that it can be "dry and deterministic". Tony Mastrangeli stated that the game "plays well at all player counts" in a review for Board Game Quest. He also stated that the expansion set Photosynthesis: Under the Moonlight detracted from the game and worsened gameplay, though it did have a few interesting additions.

== Awards ==
Photosynthesis was one of five recipients of the 2018 Mensa Select award.
