= Sherlock Holmes: Consulting Detective (gamebook) =

1981 board game game book

- Original edition, 1982
- Publishers: Sleuth Publications
- Publication: 1982
- Genres: Deduction

Sherlock Holmes: Consulting Detective is a game of reasoning and deduction published by Sleuth Publications in 1982 that is based on the Sherlock Holmes body of works by Sir Arthur Conan Doyle. Multiple expansions and reprints of the game have since been released in many languages. The game won both a Charles S. Roberts Award and Spiel des Jahres.

== Description ==
Sherlock Holmes: Consulting Detective is a game of deduction for 1 to 6 players. Each player, taking on the role of one of Sherlock Holmes' Baker Street Irregulars, tries to solve mysteries in the absence of Holmes, who is otherwise engaged. The players are given a brief introduction, and gather clues from various locations, trying to solve the mystery by visiting as few locations as possible.

=== Gameplay ===
In a general introduction, Holmes tells the players that there are several reliable sources of information: St Barts Morgue, Scotland Yard Criminology Laboratory, Scotland Yard, Public Records Office, Somerset House, the Old Bailey, the Inns of Court, Raven & Rat Inn, Parsons Toy Shoppe (owned by an informer), the offices of The Times and The Police Gazette, several clubs, and the Central Carriage Stables. A map of Victorian London, and a clue-filled reproduction of The Times are also included to help with cases.

An introduction to the mystery is then read, which includes descriptions of the scene of the crime and several people connected with the crime. The players then decide where to look for further clues. The London Directory booklet lists which locale to visit to speak to a particular person. Each location reveals one or more clues about the case (as found in the Clue Book). After visiting one or more locations, a player may feel that enough clues have been found to identify all of the details of the case.

In order to ascertain whether the player has discovered the correct solution, the player must answer several questions from the Quiz Book. The player earns points for each correct answer, but loses points for each location that was visited. If playing competitively, the highest score wins the game. If playing solitaire or cooperatively, the player or players can compare their score to Sherlock Holmes' score.

=== Scenarios ===
The original game contains ten scenarios:

- The Case of the Murdered Munitions Magnate
- The Case of the Mystified Murderess
- The Case of the Lionized Lions
- The Case of the Cryptic Corpse
- The Case of the Mummy's Curse
- The Case of the Banker's Quietus
- The Thames Murders
- The Case of the Tin Soldier
- The Case of the Solicitous Solicitor
- The Case of the Pilfered Paintings

== Publication history ==
Sherlock Holmes: Consulting Detective was released by Sleuth Publications in 1982 as a boxed set containing three booklets (London Directory, Case Book and Quiz Book), a map of London, and a clue-filled reproduction of The Times. A deluxe edition containing all of the above was packaged in a leatherette binder. The game rapidly became a bestseller with over 500,000 sales. The game was licensed to various publishers around the world, including Ben Sanders Co. (U.K.), KOSMOS (German), Futami Shobo Publishing Co. (Japanese), Jeux Descartes (French), International Team (Italian), Äventyrsspel (Swedish), Edge Entertainment (Spanish), Kaissa Chess & Games (Greek), CrowD Games (Russian), Angry Lion Games (Korean), Galápagos Jogos (Portuguese), Rawstone (Chinese), and Lord of Boards (Ukrainian).

Sleuth released a number of expansion packs containing new mysteries including The Mansion Murders (1983, containing five adventures), The Queen's Park Affair (1984, one adventure over three days), and "Adventures by Gaslight" (1986, one adventure over five days). West End Adventures (1990, containing six adventures) was a stand-alone expansion. Other scenarios, like "Sherlock Holmes & the Baby" (1986) were printed in specialty publications.

Sleuth used the same game system to produce Gumshoe: The Hard-Boiled Detective in the Thirties in 1985.

Starting in 2016, Space Cowboys published a series of standalone Sherlock Holmes: Consulting Detective games that include revised versions of older cases.

=== Video game adaptations ===
ICOM Simulations adapted the game into the Sherlock Holmes: Consulting Detective video game in 1991. Two sequels followed: Sherlock Holmes: Consulting Detective Vol. II (1992) and Sherlock Holmes: Consulting Detective Vol. III (1993).

== Reception ==
In Issue 25 of Abyss, Dave Nalle called this "a remarkable game and worth looking for." Nalle noted "The detail worked out for the game and the complex ideas being it are excellent. It is fun to play, easy to learn, and actually involves careful thought and gives a good feeling for the ideas behind the Holmes stories." However, Nalle questioned the limited lifespan of the game, since there were only ten scenarios, and also pointed out that "if you take an unorthodox route to solving a case and it is not covered by the clue book, you lose out." Nalle also didn't like the complete absence of player interaction. Despite this, Nalle concluded, "On the whole, this is an excellent game and I can recommend it with few reservations."

In Issue 53 of the British wargaming magazine Perfidious Albion, Geoffrey Barnard called this " a rather interesting work", but pointed out that the end of the game was somewhat challenging for a solitaire player, noting "you will find that [Sherlock's] estimated number of clue points is suspiciously low. Yes he could solve the case, no he could not always have ensured (except by hindsight) that his was the only solution." Despite this, Barnard concluded, "I found the game both innovative and interesting. After you have made your play you can always sit back and read all the clues to see what you missed for good or ill. It can be played solitaire and has excellent atmosphere. I recommend it to one and all."

In the May 1984 edition of Imagine (Issue 14), Dave Durant gave a positive review, stating "the game runs well and offers a different form of mental exercise to doing the crossword. A welcome change in the face of gaming."

In the August 1983 edition of White Dwarf (Issue 44), Charles Vasey commented, "The success of Consulting Detective reminds me of the success of Call of Cthulhu both being fixed in an era that appears less amenable to fantasy than it has proved to be." A year later, in Issue 55, Nic Grecas gave it an excellent overall rating of 9 out of 10, and stated that "I like this game very much and urge you not to be put off by the high price - it's worth every penny!"

In the December 1983 issue of Isaac Asimov's Science Fiction Magazine, Dana Lombardy recommended this as "one of the best games introduced in 1982."

In the November–December 1984 edition of Space Gamer (Issue 71), William A. Barton gave high marks for this game, saying, "the Sherlock Holmes Consulting Detective Game is the best mystery game I've ever had the privilege to be stumped by. After acing most games of Clue or 221B Baker Street with no sweat, it's a refreshing feeling. The folks at Sleuth Publications are to be commended for the effort they put into this game [...] As both a confirmed Sherlockian and a dedicated gamer, I can't recommend this game highly enough. Unless you simply hate mysteries - buy it! Definitely not elementary."

Games included this game in its "1982 Top 100 Games", calling it "the most ingenious and realistic detective game ever devised, and it can be played solitaire, cooperatively, or competitively." Games repeated the accolade in 1986, saying, "The 10 cases supplied are detailed and atmospheric, giving you the uncanny feeling of actually living in a Holmes story."

In Issue 31 of the French games magazine Casus Belli, Roger Wenk reviewed Sherlock Holmes: Detective Conseil, the French translation by Jeux Descartes, and called it "truly a unique game ... Ultra-researched, it is a real 'must' regarding the Victorian era and the work of Conan Doyle." Wenk noted, "for once, the reader really has a chance. There are no inaccessible clues, nor last-minute revelations likely to distort the investigator's reasoning." Wenk concluded, "if you want to best enjoy your Consulting Detective games, play in collaboration with a few friends (several minds are better than one), prepare plenty of tea and light your pipe before closing your eyes. Can't you hear the cabs in the street? In a few moments, Sherlock Holmes will open the door and declare: 'Get up, Watson, the game's afoot.'

In Issue 25 of the French games magazine Jeux & Stratégie, Guy Konopnicki commented, "Consulting Detective can be either an individual exercise or a race to find the solution, a family police war for winter evenings." Konopnicki concluded, "it has the merit of being as close as possible to the work of Conan Doyle. Not only are most of the cases taken from it, but the reader of the adventures of Sherlock Holmes is a privileged player: to win, it is preferable to be totally imbued with the spirit of the hero. In this sense, it is also a cultural game." In Issue 36, Benjamin Hannuna reviewed Sherlock Holmes: Detective Conseil, the French translation by Jeux Descartes, and noted the game's simplicity, writing, "The rules (eight pages) are simple, quickly learned, and require no special preparation. You can start playing immediately... A case can be solved, with several players, in barely half a day. Alone, the player can play several times, without time constraints." Hannuna noted that the only problem with the game was the wait for further cases to be published once the first ten scenarios had been solved. Hannuna concluded by giving the game a rating of 10 out of 10 for presentation, 8 out of 10 for clarity of rules, and the top rating of 3 hearts for loving the game "passionately".

In the January 1990 edition of Games International (Issue 12), Kevin Jacklin called it "The best of all the Sherlock Holmes games." He commented that "Although it is possible to play the game competitively (and extremely well solo), it is best enjoyed when players discuss amongst themselves the merits of visiting various clue points one at a time. The enjoyment comes from seeing if one can unscramble a case, not merely from scoring points."

In a retrospective review of Sherlock Holmes: Consulting Detective in Black Gate, Bob Byrne said "Overall, it looks good, it definitely has a Holmes feel and it works solo. I’d give it three pipes on a scale of five."

== Reviews ==
- Analog Science Fiction and Fact

== Awards ==
- At the 1983 Origins Awards, Sherlock Holmes: Consulting Detective was awarded the Charles S. Roberts Award for "Best Fantasy Boardgame of 1982". Critic Dana Lombardy explained, "While not technically a 'fantasy' game, it was thought so highly of as to be voted onto the final awards ballot in the category because it features a fictional character."
- The game was declared the winner of the 1985 Spiel des Jahres.

== Other recognition ==
A copy of Sherlock Holmes: Consulting Detective is held in the collection of the Strong National Museum of Play (object 104.888).
