= Gigamic =

French board game publisher

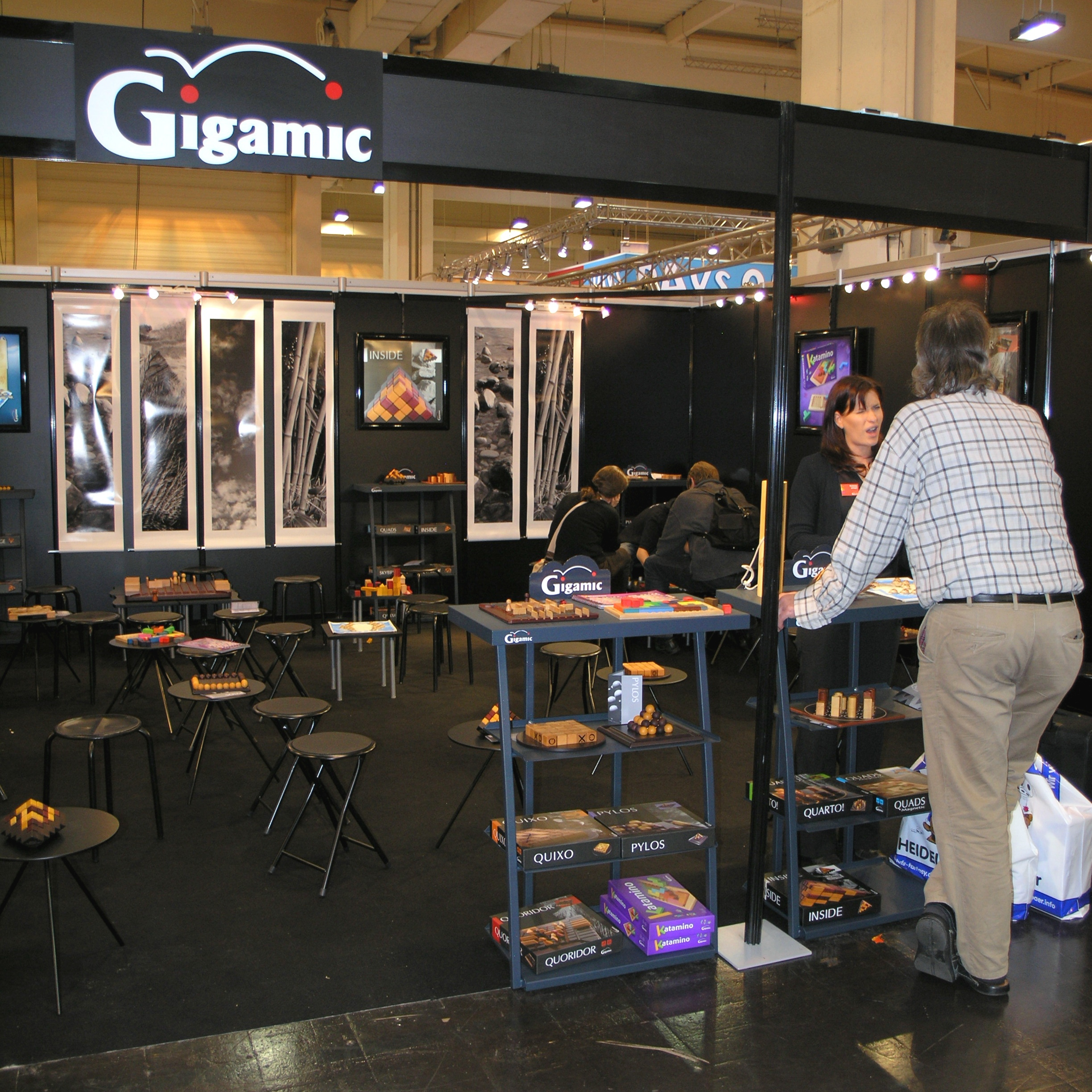
Gigamic on Essen Spiel 2008

Gigamic is a French publisher and distributor of games started up by three brothers. Gigamic started in 1991 by three of six brothers named Stéphane Gires, Ludovic Gires and Jean-Christophe Gires. Since 2001, Gigamic has operated a distribution center in France.

== Games ==
The company produces games and brain teasers for all ages. Gigamic has around 400 board game references adapted to all. Gigamic games have been produced in over 30 languages and 45 countries. Gigamic games have won a number of awards all over the world and several are considered as classics. Some of their games include:

- Quarto
- Quoridor
- Quixo
- Squadro
- Pylos
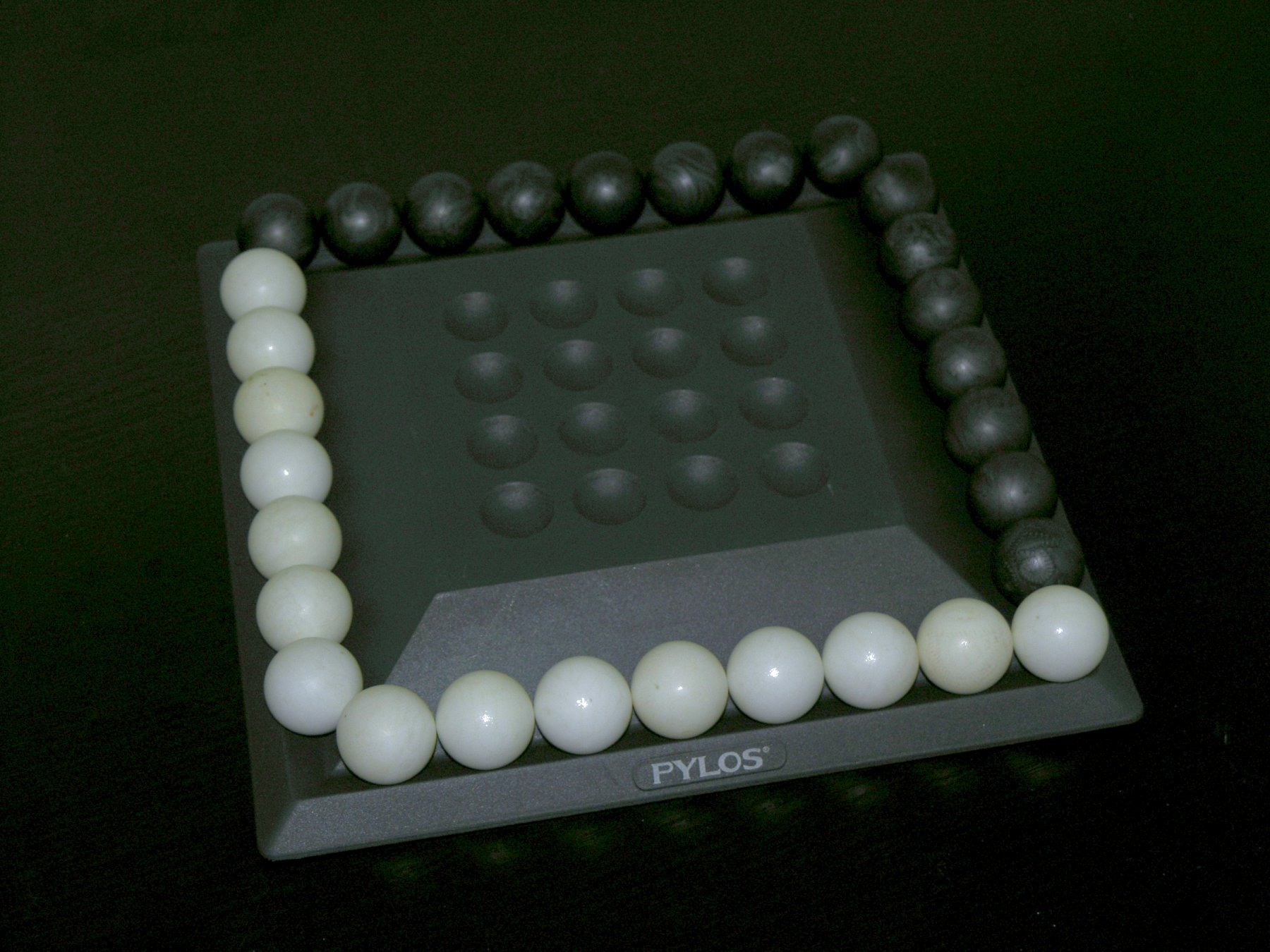
  Pylos 1
- Quantik
- Katamino
- KLASK
