= Piatnik =

Austrian playing card and board games manufacturing company

Wiener Spielkartenfabrik Ferd. Piatnik & Söhne
- Company type: GmbH & Co KG
- Industry: Playing card manufacturer
- Founded: 1824
- Headquarters: Vienna, Austria
- Revenue: €27 million (2010)
- Number of employees: 200
- Website: piatnik.com

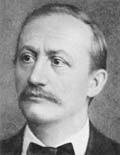
Ferdinand Piatnik ran the cardmakers from 1842

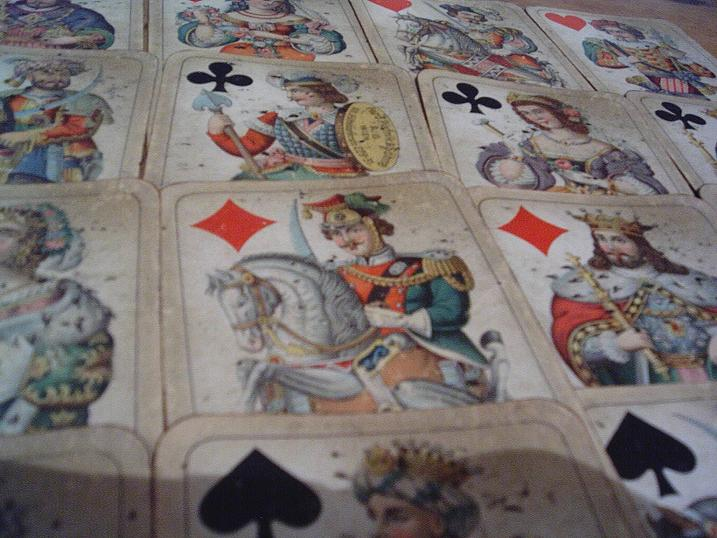
Tarock card set by Piatnik & Söhne

Wiener Spielkartenfabrik Ferd. Piatnik & Söhne, commonly referred to as Piatnik, is an Austrian playing card and board game manufacturing company based in Vienna.

== History ==
The company was founded in 1824 by the card manufacturer Anton Moser (1784–1842) in Vienna's 7th district. Upon his death, his professional colleague the Hungarian-born Ferdinand Piatnik (1819–1885) took over in 1843, marrying Moser's widow a few years later. Piatnik's three sons joined the ranks in 1882 adding their names to their father's company name.

Ferdinand died in 1885, leaving the successful business to his sons and his widow. In 1891, a new factory building was built on Hütteldorfer Straße in the 14th district. In 1896, the firm of Piatnik Nándor és Fiai was founded as a sister company. Piatnik continued to expand and in 1899 bought the playing card manufacturer, Ritter & Cie in Prague. As early as 1923 Piatnik received an 'irrevocable' national award and thus the right to use the Austrian coat of arms in its business in perpetuity. In 1939, the Viennese parent company was incorporated into the family limited partnership Wiener Spielkartenfabrik Ferd. Piatnik & Sons.

After the war, multi-colour offset printing was introduced in 1951. In 1956, the playing card factory expanded its range to include board games, and puzzles have also been produced since 1966.

Piatnik Wien has since established itself as a major business, having sold 25 million packs of cards (including Tarot, Tarock, Bridge, Préférence, Schnapsen, Double German and French packs), one million puzzles and one million board games (such as Activity, Tick Tack Bumm, Abalone, Pass the Pigs and Scrabble) in over 72 countries. The firm offers more than 200 social and family games and 1,000 play card pack variants.

In 1962, the factory premises in Vienna were expanded to include several reinforced concrete halls, and again in 1985.

In 1990, Activity was released, an entertainment game for children and adults that has been translated into five languages. Meanwhile, 15 different variants of the successful party game have appeared. Thanks to the ProSieben game show, Extreme Activity, this variant is now also available for purchase as a game.

The first subsidiary was founded in 1989, Piatnik of America. It was followed by subsidiaries in Germany, Czech Republic and Hungary.

Today Ferdinand G. Piatnik (4th) and Dieter Strehl run the business and the next generation is already in training. The company has around 200 employees worldwide, around 150 in Vienna. According to the company, around 10,000 board games, 100,000 playing card packs and 4,000 puzzles are sold in over 60 countries around the world every day.

In 1997 in Vienna, Penzing (14th district) the Ferdinand-Piatnik-Weg was named after the founder of the company.

In 2010 over 2 million games, 1 million puzzles and 25 million game packages were produced in Vienna. The turnover was 27 million euros.

Today, with sales subsidiaries in Germany, the Czech Republic, Hungary and the US, Piatnik is Austria's largest game publisher and a leading provider of games in Europe. The traditional Viennese company is represented in 72 countries with board games, playing cards and puzzles.

== See also ==
- List of game manufacturers
