= List of game manufacturers =

This list includes publishers (not manufacturers, contrary to title, see external links) of card games, board games, miniatures games, wargames, role-playing games, and collectible card games, and companies which sell accessories for use in those games. Not included in this list are companies that simply resell products of other companies, although many of the companies listed here do have online stores that sell their own products.

== 0–9 ==
- 1i Productions – board games
- 3W – wargames and wargaming magazines

== A ==
- Ad Astra Games – wargames
- Agents of Gaming – wargames
- Agglo – magnetic travel games
- Alea – part of Ravensburger
- Alderac Entertainment Group – collector card games, role-playing games
- Alternative Armies – wargames
- Amarillo Design Bureau Inc. – space war games and miniatures
- Amigo Spiele – board games
- APBA – sports, board, and computer games
- Apex Publications – role-playing games
- Arc Dream Publishing – role-playing games
- Archaia Studios Press – role-playing games
- Art Meets Matter – board games and game design concepts
- Asmodée Éditions – board games; formerly called Siroz
- Atlas Games – collectible card games, card games, and role-playing games
- Australian Design Group – wargames
- Avalanche Press – historical boardgames and historical d20 modules
- Avalon Hill – board games; part of Wizards of the Coast

== B ==
- Bandai – collector card games
- Bards and Sages – role-playing games
- Battleline Publications – wargames
- Bethesda Softworks – role-playing/freeroam games; Fallout series and Elder Scrolls series
- Biohazard Games – role-playing games
- Black Industries – role-playing accessories
- Blacksburg Tactical Research Center – role-playing games
- Blue Devil Games - role-playing games, games of strategy
- British Isles Traveller Support – role-playing accessories
- Buffalo Games – board games, jig saw puzzles
- Bully Pulpit Games - indie role-playing games

== C ==
- Cactus Game Design – Bible-themed board and card games
- Cakebread & Walton – role-playing games
- Cartamundi – board games, playing cards and cards for games
- Catalyst Game Labs – wargames and role-playing games
- Chaosium – role-playing games
- Cheapass Games – cheaply produced board games and card games
- Clash of Arms – Art of War magazine and miniatures rules
- Clementoni - educational board games
- Columbia Games – historical and miniatures games, board games
- Conflict Games – wargames
- CoolMiniOrNot – miniatures games, board games, card games
- Cosmic Wimpout – dice games
- Crafty Games – role-playing games
- Cranium, Inc. – board games and card games
- Crown and Andrews – board games, educational games, wooden puzzles, Rubiks puzzles, and jigsaw puzzles
- Cubicle 7 Entertainment – role-playing and card games
- Czech Games Edition – board games

== D ==
- Days of Wonder – board games
- Decipher, Inc. – trading card games, role-playing games
- Decision Games – board games
- Descartes Editeur – board games
- Destination Games – dice games
- Different Worlds – role-playing games and accessories
- Dragon – gaming magazine
- Dream Pod 9 – miniatures and role-playing games
- Dwarfstar Games – wargames

== E ==
- Eagle Games – board and card games
- Eden Studios, Inc. – card, role-playing, and computer games
- Eos Press – role-playing and card games
- Eurogames – board games
- Evil Hat Productions – role-playing games
- Exile Games Studio – role-playing games

== F ==
- Fantasy Flight Games – board games, d20 System supplements and role-playing games
- Fantasy Games Unlimited – role-playing games and accessories
- Fantasy Productions – role-playing games
- FASA Corporation – role-playing games, tabletop war games (out of business; see WizKids and Fanpro)
- Fleer – collector card games accessories
- Flying Buffalo – board, role playing, and play-by-mail games
- Fretter's – board games
- FSpace Publications – role-playing games
- Forge World – resin miniature wargames

== G ==
- Galileo Games - role-playing games
- The Game Crafter – card games, board games, game pieces, game accessories
- Game Designers' Workshop – wargames and role-playing games (out of business; see Far Future Enterprises)
- Game Research/Design – wargames
- The Gamers – wargames, board games
- Games Research Inc – board wargames
- Games Workshop – miniature games and board games
- Gibsons Games – board games
- GiftTRAP – board games
- Gigamic – board games
- GMT Games – board, card, and role-playing games
- Goodman Games – role-playing games
- Great White Games – collector card games and card games
- Green Knight Publishing – role-playing games
- Green Ronin Publishing – role-playing accessories
- Grenadier Miniatures – miniatures and board games
- Grimoire Games – role-playing games
- Guardians of Order – role-playing games
- Guidon Games – board games and wargames

== H ==
- Hero Time – board games, cardgames and toys
- Habermaaß GmbH – board games
- Hans im Glück – board games
- Harebrained Schemes – miniatures, boardgames
- Hasbro – board and card games
- Hero Games – role-playing games and accessories
- Hidden City Games – collector card games
- Hobby Japan – wargames
- Holistic Design – role-playing and computer games
- Humanhead Studios – role-playing games and accessories
- Hyperion Entertainment – board games

== I ==
- Iron Crown Enterprises – role-playing games
- Issaries, Inc. – role-playing games
- Italeri – miniatures

== J ==
- J. W. Spear & Sons – board games
- Jaques of London – board games
- Jedko Games – wargames
- Jeux Descartes – role-playing games
- JKLM Games – board games
- John Wallis – board games
- Judges Guild – role-playing accessories

== K ==
- Kenzer & Company – miniatures and role-playing games
- Kosmos – board games
- Kobold Press – role-playing games

== L ==
- Last Unicorn Games – role-playing games and miniatures
- Lego – building blocks
- Looney Labs – card and board games
- Late for the Sky Production Company – property trading board games
- Lookout Games - board games and card games
- Lumpley Games - role-playing games and game supplements

== M ==
- Magpie Games - role-playing games
- Majora – board, card and other games (several educational), books, puzzles and toys (several educational)
- Margaret Weis Productions, Ltd – role-playing games
- Matrix Games – wargames
- Mattel – board and card games
- Mayfair Games – board and role-playing games
- McFarlane Toys – miniatures
- McLoughlin Brothers – board games
- Mego Corporation – board and card games, action-figure type toys; now defunct
- Melbourne House – wargames
- Merillian – board games
- Metagaming Concepts – board and role-playing games
- Milton Bradley Company (Hasbro Company) – board games
- Mind Storm Labs – role-playing games
- Misfit Studios – role-playing games
- MJM Australia – board games
- Modiphius Entertainment – role-playing games, boardgames, miniature wargames and card games.
- Mongoose Publishing – role-playing games and accessories, miniatures games
- Monte Cook – role-playing accessories
- Morning – board and card games
- Multi-Man Publishing – wargames

== N ==
- Naipes Heraclio Fournier – card games
- National Entertainment Collectibles Association – action figures
- Necromancer Games – role-playing accessories
- Neogames – role-playing games
- Nightfall Games – role-playing games
- Nikoli – board games
- Nintendo – began as a card game manufacturer

== O ==
- Operational Studies Group – wargames
- Osprey Publishing – role-playing accessories
- Out of the Box Publishing – board and card games
- Outset Media – board and card games

== P ==
- Pacesetter Ltd – role-playing games and board games (defunct)
- Pagan Publishing – role-playing accessories
- Paizo Publishing – role-playing games and accessories
- Palladium Books – role-playing games
- Paradigm Concepts – role-playing accessories
- Pariah Press – role-playing games
- Parker Brothers – board games
- Partizan Press – role-playing games
- Patch Products – board and card games
- Pelgrane Press – role-playing games
- Phage Press – role-playing games
- Piatnik & Söhne – card games
- Pinnacle Entertainment Group – role-playing and collector card games
- Piquet – wargames
- Point Zero Games – card games
- Precedence Entertainment – collector card games
- Precis Intermedia – role-playing and miniatures games
- Pressman Toy Corp. -board games
- Price Stern Sloan – card games
- Privateer Press – miniatures and role-playing games

== Q ==
- Q-workshop – game accessories
- Queen Games – board games

== R ==
- R. Talsorian Games – role-playing games
- R&R Games - board games and toys
- Ral Partha – miniatures, accessories, paints, miniature rules, and board games.
- Ravensburger
- Reaper Miniatures
- Reindeer Games – role-playing games
- Replay Publishing – sports board games
- Rio Grande Games – board games
- Ronin Arts – role-playing games
- RoseArt – board games
- Roxley – board games

== S ==
- Sabertooth Games – collector card games
- Score – collector card games
- Selchow & Righter – family board games
- Set Enterprises – card games
- Simulations Publications, Inc. (SPI) – wargames and role-playing games
- Skirmisher Publishing – miniatures and role-playing accessories
- Sovereign Press, Inc – role-playing accessories
- Spica Publishing – role-playing game supplements
- Steve Jackson Games – board, card, and role-playing games
- Strat-O-Matic – board games
- Strategic Studies Group – collectible card games
- Sword & Sorcery Studios – role-playing games and accessories

== T ==
- Takara – role-playing games
- Target Games – role-playing games
- Task Force Games – board games and wargames
- TDC Games – board games and jigsaw puzzles
- TerrorBull Games – satirical and educational board and card games
- Testor Corporation – miniatures accessories
- ThinkFun – educational games, brainteasers and card games (formerly; Binary Arts Corp.)
- THQ – role-playing games
- Tilsit Editions – board games
- Tomy – board and card games
- Toy Vault, Inc. – licensed board and card games
- Tri Tac Games – role-playing games miniatures micro games
- Troll Lord Games – role-playing accessories
- TSR, Inc. – role-playing and board games; part of Hasbro
- Tuff Stuff – collector card games
- Tuonela Productions Ltd – board games

== U ==
- Überplay – board and card games
- Ungame – board and card games
- Upper Deck Entertainment – collectible card games
- United States Playing Card Company – cards

== V ==
- Vajra Enterprises – role-playing games
- Victory Games – role-playing games

== W ==
- Waddingtons – board and card games
- Wargames Factory – hard plastic miniatures
- Wargames Foundry – miniatures
- Wargames Research Group – miniatures games
- West End Games – role-playing accessories
- White Wolf Publishing – role-playing games
- Wicked Dead Brewing Company – role-playing games
- Wizards of the Coast – collectible card games and role-playing games; now part of Hasbro
- WizKids – miniatures games and board games
- Woodland Scenics – miniatures accessories
- Wyrd Miniatures – miniatures and board games

== Y ==
- Yaquinto Publications – wargames

== Z ==
- Z-Man Games – board, card, and role-playing games

== See also ==
- List of role-playing game publishers
- Lists of video game companies
- Outline of games
