= The Art of Peace (disambiguation) =

The Art of Peace is a selection from works of Morihei Ueshiba, published in 1997.

The Art of Peace, or variation, may also refer to:

- Diplomacy, the art opposite of the art of war
- Art of Peace Award, an award for an artist selected by the President's Peace Commission of St. Mary's University, San Antonio, Texas, US
- The Art of Peace, a martial arts philosophy of Morihei Ueshiba
- The Art of Peace: An Illustrated Biography on Prince Iyesato Tokugawa, a 2019 biography of Tokugawa Iesato by Stan S. Katz
- The Art of Peace, the autobiography of Sir David Khalili, published 2023
- Songs for Tibet: The Art of Peace, a 2008 album
- The Arts of Peace, a statue in Washington, D.C., US

== See also ==
- The Essential Arts of Peace, a fictional sutra from the Japanese manga comic book Qwan
- Piece of art
- Diplomacy (disambiguation)
- The Art of War (disambiguation)
- The War of Art (disambiguation)
- Peace (disambiguation)
- Art (disambiguation)
