= Diplomacy (disambiguation) =

Diplomacy is the art and practice of conducting negotiations between representatives of states.

Diplomacy also may refer to:

== Arts and entertainment ==
- Diplomacy (Kissinger book), a 1994 book by Henry Kissinger
- Diplomacy (Moreno Pino book), a 1996 book by Ismael Moreno Pino
- Diplomatie (play), 2011 play by Cyril Gély

=== Films ===
- Diplomacy (1916 film), 1916 silent film by Sidney Olcott
- Diplomacy (1926 film), 1926 American silent film by Marshall Neilan
- Diplomacy (2014 film), 2014 Franco-German film by Volker Schlöndorff, based on the 2011 play

=== Games ===
- Diplomacy (game), a World War I themed strategic board game by Allan B. Calhamer
  - Diplomacy (1984 video game)
  - Diplomacy (2005 video game)
  - Avalon Hill's Diplomacy, a turn-based computer strategy game
- Diplomacy, second "micro-expansion" to the PC strategy game Sins of a Solar Empire

== See also ==
- Category:Types of diplomacy
- Category:Diplomacy
