= The Game of Diplomacy =

1979 book

- Author: Richard Sharp
- Publisher: Arthur Barker
- Publication date: 1979
- Publication place: UK
- Pages: 192
- ISBN: 0213166763
- OCLC: 6355974

The Game of Diplomacy is a book about the board game Diplomacy written by British author Richard Sharp (died March 7, 2003) and published in 1978. It describes fundamentals of play, tactics, and strategies for success in the game.

== Diplomacy ==
The board game Diplomacy was first published in 1959, and by the mid-1970s, had become quite popular for a wargame, supposedly a favorite of John F. Kennedy, Henry Kissinger, and Walter Cronkite. In 1980, game designer Jon Freeman called it "Probably the most famous wargame in existence."

== Description ==
In the mid-1970s, Richard Sharp was the author of several books about games, including Winning Rugby (1968), Best Games People Play (1976), The Book of Games (1977) and Competitive Bidding (1980). But Sharp was also a top-ranked Diplomacy player who also edited Dolchstoß, a popular "dippy zine" of the time and the flagship publication of Great Britain's National Games Club (NGC).

Sharp wrote The Game of Diplomacy to explain the game and try to expand its audience. The 192-page hardcover book was published by Weidenfeld & Nicolson's imprint Arthur Barker Inc. in 1978. The book is divided into 13 chapters:

Chapter 1: "Fundamentals": The basic rules of the game

- A basic introduction of the game rules, and objectives of the game.
- Making alliances and unexpectedly breaking alliances ("backstabbing"). Sharp noted that to win, "you must behave like a complete 'cad'."

Chapter 2: "The Smyler with the Knyf under the Cloak"

- Recognizing the various types of players is vital.
- During negotiation, always lie about the reasons for the moves but not about the moves themselves.
- Play every game as a fresh start, rather than bringing grievances from a previous game to the new game.
- Think about the long-term value of possible alliances. Sharp suggests the following:

To Ally With:	England	France	Germany	Italy	Austria	Turkey	Russia
England	—	No	Yes	No	No	Perhaps	Yes
France	No	—	Yes	No	No	No	No
Germany	No	No	—	Yes	Yes	Yes	No
Italy	Perhaps	Yes	Yes	—	Yes	No	Yes
Austria	No	No	Yes	Yes	—	No	Yes
Turkey	Yes	No	Yes	No	No	—	Yes
Russia	Yes	No	No	No	No	Yes	—

Chapter 3: More about tactics

- Regarding the inevitable betrayal, Sharp counsels the player to always set up a backstab during the preceding negotiations.
- A player should never betray an ally unless the player is completely sure that the victim cannot possibly recover from the betrayal.
- What to do if "lines of stalemate" occur, with an alliance of half the players on one side, and the other players on the other side.

Chapter 4: England

- Surrounded by the sea makes it difficult for England to be invaded but also difficult for England to invade anywhere else.
- The majority of England's defeats are caused by French fleets sneaking into the unguarded rear.
- England could reach 14 supply centres but then will be unable to proceed further with any degree of ease.

Chapter 5: Germany

- Sharp favours Germany to win by becoming allies with everyone and then letting them all tear each other up.

Chapter 6: Russia

- Russia is a favourite to win because of naval ports in both the north and the south, and the ability to switch to either of these fronts should the other bog down.

Chapter 7: Turkey

- Sharp confessed to never having won as Turkey, and believed that Turkey's game will always be confined to the southeast part of the board, confined by Russia to the north and Italy to the east.

Chapter 8: Austria

- Although admitting that Austria was often eliminated from most games very early, he believed that there were strategies ("The Hedgehog" and "Anschluss") that would give Austria a good chance of success.

Chapter 9: Italy

- Sharp admits that Italy does not have a good chance of winning the game, and suggested that the player attempts to achieve second place.

Chapter 10: France

- Like Germany, France is a powerhouse, and is always in a good position to take two supply centres almost immediately.
- For France to do well, it must be at war with England.
- France's main problem is over-confidence.

Chapter 11: An Introduction to Postal Diplomacy

- A short history of how the play by mail (PBM) game developed, and how it differs from a "face to face" game.

Chapter 12: Vive la Difference

- Methods to shorten the game, especially for PBM games, including predetermined conditional retreats.
- More tactics
- Unethical but legal stratagems for PBM games
- How to deal with poor players

Chapter 13: Variants

- Thirty variants of the game, including: using more than seven players; an expanded map; and hidden movement.

== Reception ==
In Issue 36 of the British wargaming magazine Perfidious Albion, Charles Vasey thought the first chapter on fundamentals was not basic enough. "More illustrations, examples and notes would have made this chapter of value to the novice." However, Vasey complimented Sharp for his explanations of tactics and negotiating in the next chapters, writing, "A new player will be well prepared by these chapters. He will be tactically much stronger and he will be mentally equipped to take his first betrayal ... He will definitely find much of interest in the seven chapters on each of the countries." Vasey thought Sharp's discussion of the differences between the board game and play-by-mail "both illuminating and amusing." Vasey concluded, "Well worth purchasing for the novice who is prepared to overcome the first chapter, valuable for its tactical insight for the experienced gamer, and worth checking out for the veteran to read to his friends. ... Written in an amusing and entertaining style, it was a pleasure to review."

In Issue 22 of the British game magazine Diplomacy World, Mark Berch called this book "a delight to read. Sharp's writing style is smooth, concise, witty and literate ... I have never seen anywhere the 'feel' of the game and hobby so well recounted." Berch found the second chapter regarding the techniques and psychology of negotiation "the most fascinating part of the book, and is masterfully written." However, Berch found Sharp's discussion of stalemate lines "disappointing", and disagreed with Sharp's advice for playing several of the countries, calling the chapter on Turkey "a fiasco." Berch concluded, "This is not, appearances to the contrary, a comprehensive text on Diplomacy. Instead, it is Diplomacy as Richard Sharp thinks it ought to be played." Despite this, Berch ended with a positive recommendation, writing, "Almost regardless of your level of competence, you will improve your play and your enjoyment of the game. And no one will be immune to the sheer pleasure of reading such a well written book."

In Issue 3 of Bull's Run (February 1984), Richard Gee felt that too many people used the strategies expounded in Sharp's book, commenting, "Sharp's exposition is biased towards some countries [Germany and France] and unnaturally indifferent to others with the result that those two countries have received undeserved attention to the detriment of the remainder." Gee pointed out in the five years after the publication of Sharp's book, "the effect is that Diplomacy in the United Kingdom has become unbalanced, as more and more people play the Sharp way." Gee backed this up with statistics of hundreds of published game results, noting that before the publication of The Game of Diplomacy, Russia won the most times, but was closely followed by all other countries with the exception of Italy. Four years after the book's publication, France and Germany, favourites of Sharp, joined Russia in the top tier of winners, while all other countries now lagged far behind.
