= TribeNet =

Play-by-mail fantasy game

- Publishers: TribeNet
- Years active: 1985 to present
- Genres: play-by-mail
- Languages: English
- Playing time: no limit
- Materials required: Instructions, order sheets, turn results, paper, pencil
- Media type: email
- Website: https://tribenet.com.au/

TribeNet is an open-ended, medieval fantasy, play-by-email (PBEM) game. It was first published in the mid-1980s in Australia as a hand-moderated play-by-mail (PBM) game. After multiple gamemaster changes in the 1990s, Peter Rzechorzek took over as gamemaster in 1997, at which point the game transitioned from postal mail to email. Since its inception, the game expanded from the initial continent available for gameplay, adding additional continents such as Cyberia and Pelagoria.

The game is set in a context similar to Europe's Bronze or Iron Age where players assume the role of Chief of a Clan of people. There are no preset character types and players can choose how to gameplay their Clans in a manner of their choosing with tasks such as mining or exploring.

== History and development ==
In the mid-1980s, TribeNet launched as a PBM game in Australia, hand-moderated by Jeff Perkins, drawing players from the Diplomacy and wargaming clubs of some of its major cities. Various people rotated through as gamemaster until 1997 when Peter Rzechorzek assumed the role. Eventually, the game shifted to a play-by-email (PBEM) version. In 2004, the game had 95 players. In 2013 a new version of the game was launched.

The first continent in 1985 was Pi, designed by Perkins, who introduced another continent within the next few years. All new players then started on the second continent. In 2004, a third continent was launched. In 2005, a five-island set was added under the name Pelagoria. Additional continents added include Anneland, Groland, Cyberia, and Tresmania.

== Gameplay ==
TribeNet occurs in a context similar to western Europe's Bronze or Iron Age. Players run their Clans which can accomplish various tasks such as mining or exploring. Gameplay focuses on "strategic thinking and positioning, tactical planning, political alliance and military and economic development". There are no character types and players may gameplay their Clan in a manner of their liking, whether focused toward combat, exploration, or other. Development of Villages enables more refined skills such as distilling, apiarism, and others. The game also allows players to delve into areas including politics, economics and research.

Rzechorzek states that the game combines aspects of multiple games including Advanced Dungeons & Dragons, Civilization, Diplomacy, and Risk. Diplomacy is an important part of the game, and players have the option of interacting through social media.

== See also ==
- List of play-by-mail games

== Bibliography ==
- Murphy, Ian (August 2019). "Endless Variety of Special Hexes: A Brief Article From a Non-Traditional Player" (PDF). Suspense and Decision. No. 18. playbymail.net. pp. 20–21.
- "Newsdesk PBM: Tribal Games" (PDF). Flagship. No. 106. Feb–Mar 2004. p. 4.
- "Newsdesk Turn Based: Tribal" (PDF). Flagship. No. 114. June–July 2005. p. 6.
- Rzechorzek, Peter (2021). "TribeNet: History". TribeNet.
- Rzechorzek, Peter (August 2019). "TribeNet: Looking For New Players!" (PDF). Suspense and Decision. No. 18. playbymail.net. pp. 38–39.
- Stanifer, Chris (August 2016). "TribeNet PBeM: A Rose Amongst Weeds" (PDF). Suspense and Decision. No. 13. playbymail.net. pp. 20–21.
- "TribeNet: FAQs". TribeNet. 2021.
