= Imaginiff =

Board game

- Publishers: Buffalo Games, Inc.
- Players: 3–8
- Setup time: 1–5 minutes
- Playing time: 40–60 minutes
- Chance: Medium
- Age range: 10 & up
- Skills: Counting, Probability, Social skills

Imaginiff is a party-type board game.

== Versions ==
- Imaginiff (The Original)
- Imaginiff Revised Edition
- Imaginiff the Card Game

== Object ==
The winner is the first to get their token all the way around the board to the center.

== Setup ==
If there are 8 players, everyone will put their name in the spaces on the outer part of the board. If there are less than 8, the name of someone else that everybody knows should be in the blank spaces. Then the grey token is placed on any name on the outside of the board. (It can not be placed on the challenge space.) The number cards are separated from the question cards. The number cards (numbered one to six) of the same color are given to the player whose token matches that color. Then the question cards are placed in a pile or in the box provided.

== Rules ==
The player that goes first rolls the die and moves the grey token that many spaces around the outside spaces, clockwise or counterclockwise. If the grey token lands on a name, that name becomes the subject of the card. The player then picks a question card and reads it out loud, inserting the subject into the blank space. A card usually says something like "Imaginiff _____ was ... Which would they be [or do]?" and lists six numbered choices. They then place the card down for everyone to see. Now, all players look through their number cards and pick the number card that corresponds to the answer they want. When all players have placed down a card, everyone flips theirs over. To move a player's token, they need to have picked the most popular answer. All players that have the most popular answer move 1 space, except the person who rolled the dice, who moves 2 if they picked the most popular answer.

If two or more answers are tied, all players that picked either answer move forward. For example, if 3 players picked number 2, another 3 players picked 5, and 2 other people picked 4, everyone who picked 2 or 5 moves forward.

In the event that 2 or more players get their tokens to the center at the same time, a tiebreaker round is played. All players who are not in the center remove their tokens from the board. However, they still play by choosing the card with the most popular answer. The tied players continue playing as usual by rolling the die and moving the grey token, and any tied player who fails to come up with the most popular answer must remove their token from the board, but may continue playing by putting down cards for the most popular answer. If all the tied players fail to come up with the most popular answer, or they tie for the most popular answer, no one is eliminated. When only one player is left with their token in the center, they win.
