= Games Research =

Games Research may refer to:

- Games Research Inc, a boardgame publisher in the 60s and 70s, the publisher of Diplomacy
- Game Research/Design, a board wargame publisher formed in 1985, the publisher of the Europa series
