= Chickapig =

Strategy board game

- Designers: Brian Calhoun and Dave Matthews
- Publishers: Buffalo Games
- Publication: 2016
- Genres: strategy board game
- Players: 2–4
- Setup time: 1-5 minutes
- Playing time: 30-60 minutes
- Website: https://chickapig.com

Chickapig is a strategy board game created by Brian Calhoun in partnership with musician Dave Matthews, and published by Buffalo Games. The game follows chicken-pig hybrids as they attempt to cross the board while avoiding their opponents. Chickapig debuted as the top-selling new game on Amazon.com in 2017. The Virginia Institute of Autism has adopted the game as a learning tool for teaching social skills.

== Concept ==
Each player is in charge of a flock of six Chickapigs. The goal is for each player to move their Chickapigs across the board to pass through the goal on the other side of the board. Simultaneously, the players attempt to derail their opponents' Chickapigs using hay bales, the cow, and cow poop.

== Gameplay ==
At the start of each turn, the players roll a die to see how many moves they can make in a straight line, either forward, backward, or sideways. Once the turn starts, they cannot stop until encountering another Chickapig, a hay bale, the cow (and cow fence), the perimeter of the game board, or the sides of the goals. The Chickapig stops in the space adjacent to whichever object it has encountered. One move is counted every time the Chickapig moves to encounter an object.

Players can move their own color Chickapigs. A player cannot move a Chickapig inside another player's goal.

== Critical reception ==
Chickapig won Best Board Game at the 2019 National Parenting Product Awards.

The game was also a finalist for a Toy Association Specialty Toy of the Year award.

== Distribution ==
In March 2019, Target Corporation launched Chickapig in its stores, including a children's book and a plush doll. The game is also available in Barnes & Noble, Walmart, and independent game stores across the United States.
