= War on Terror (game) =

Strategic board game

- The War on Terror box Box design (edition 1)
- Designers: Andy Tompkins & Andrew Sheerin
- Illustrators: Tom Morgan-Jones
- Publishers: TerrorBull Games
- Players: 2–6
- Setup time: 10–15 minutes
- Playing time: 120+ minutes (player dependent)
- Chance: low to medium
- Age range: 14+
- Skills: Strategy, diplomacy, Machiavellianism

War on Terror, The Boardgame is a satirical, strategic board game, produced and published in 2006 by TerrorBull Games. War on Terror was originally conceived in 2003 by Andy Tompkins and Andrew Sheerin, two friends based in Cambridge, England. The initial inspiration for the game came from the imminent Invasion of Iraq but, as a whole, was intended as a commentary of the wider war on terror. In 2005, Sheerin and Tompkins founded TerrorBull Games and gathered enough financial support from a mixture of friends and acquaintances to put War on Terror into production.

Widespread notoriety has meant the game has had a colourful and, at times, troubled history. Its initial release was met with a barrage of criticism, particularly from the tabloid press. Other businesses refused to be associated with the game and it was also banned from a number of industry fairs around the world. The British police even confiscated a single copy. More recently, however, opinion has turned around and War on Terror is now praised by various highly respected institutions and individuals, among them Amnesty International and John Pilger.

The gameplay has been likened to a cross between Risk, Diplomacy, Monopoly and Settlers of Catan. Like a number of war board games, the basic goal is to dominate the entire world (or "liberate" in the parlance of the game itself). However, the scope of War on Terror stretches to cover all aspects of war-time politics, not just battlefield tactics. The creators of War on Terror have correspondingly claimed it is the most realistic war simulation board game around.

== Concept ==
War on Terror, The Boardgame can be described as a Risk-like war board game inspired by modern-day geopolitics. In terms of board game style, it is a mixture of both European and American approaches – utilising elements of chance and chaos as well as strategy and player interactions.

Starting with a tiny presence on the map, each player takes on the role of a budding empire, intent on "liberating" (dominating) countries and continents, controlling oil production and building cities to win the game. An empire controls a region when it has a development there: a village, a town or a city. To expand, an empire can build developments at the border of its current empire if the regions there are unoccupied. Much of the time this will involve some fighting. There are two primary ways to interfere with other empires: fighting wars against them or funding terrorist units in the hope of making them attack your opponent. The game play is essentially card-driven – including the aforementioned warring and terrorist attack. Players obtain two such cards every turn. Additional cards can also be bought using money, which is obtained from oil. Oil is randomly spread out across the map and varies from game to game. An important issue is that when terrorists are no longer dormant and leave the training camp, they act outside the control of the empire which initially funded them, and can turn on that empire if triggered by an opposing empire or the terrorist player. An in-game twist is that defeated players are not out of the game – they become the "terrorist" players, and can still influence the result and perhaps even win. It is also possible to join the terrorist side voluntarily. An important aspect of the game centres around diplomacy and off-board negotiations and dealings. A 'secret message pad' is provided to this end and sees heavy use in a typical game.

An iconic part of the game is the "Axis of Evil": a spinner in the centre of the board which determines which player is "evil" – that player must then wear the Evil balaclava and gets two terrorist cards per turn. Other empires also have a financial incentive to fight wars against the evil empire.

The "Evil Balaclava" itself has developed a life outside of and independent of the game – something the designers encourage with the Gallery of Evil.

== Digital ==
On 25 November 2011, despite previously claiming the task was impossible, TerrorBull Games released their first video game, an iOS version of War on Terror on the Apple iTunes Store. There was initial speculation that it might get banned, but as of May 2014 the game was still available. However, as of June 2020 the game is now unavailable.

== Reception ==
=== Business ===
Several major game and toy fairs, as well as several retailers, refused to stock this product. The justification in all cases is some variation on the claim that the topic is highly inflammatory and may be offensive to some.

=== Police ===
In August 2008, a copy of the game was seized by the British Kent Police because the balaclava included in the box "could be used to conceal someone's identity or could be used in the course of a criminal act".

=== Media ===
==== The IT Crowd ====
War on Terror formed part of Roy and Moss's office set dressing since series 2 of the British sitcom The IT Crowd (on top of the shelves behind Moss's desk). Roy and Moss are seen playing the game briefly in series 2. The show's creator, Graham Linehan, is a keen gamer and an open supporter of War on Terror.

==== Games Britannia ====
In December 2009, TerrorBull Games were featured on the BBC series Games Britannia, presented by historian Benjamin Woolley. Woolley paid especial attention to War on Terror, noting that while it continued a certain historical tradition – going back to ancient times – of games that attempt to interpret the world around them, War on Terror was different in using satire to examine its chosen themes.

=== Politics ===
Before the game was even released, it had created enough of a stir to warrant a response from the members of the British Parliament. The Conservative MP for South Cambridgeshire, Andrew Lansley, commented, "this board game is in very bad taste and it appears as though somebody has gone too far". Jim Paice, Conservative MP for South East Cambridgeshire, meanwhile claimed he "[didn't] like the sound of it".

=== Art ===
War on Terror formed part of the 'Embedded Art' exhibition at the Berlin Academy of Arts in January 2009. The exhibition looked at the effects of wartime and security on art. The creators of War on Terror and the illustrator were invited to the gallery to take part in a live, interactive game during the gallery's annual open night.

=== Education ===
War on Terror is used by some educators around the world as a tool for broaching and examining the often complex issues contained within. (Note: Nick Megoran, a lecturer in geopolitics at Newcastle University in England, is one of a number of teachers that support the game as a teaching aid. Megoran praised it highly when reviewing it for New Internationalist in August 2007, awarding it the maximum '5 stars' rating. He is also quoted as saying the game is "a cleverly crafted satire that can be used by educators to provoke students to think critically about one of the most important issues of our time") War on Terror has been used in the following disciplines: geography, geopolitics, international relations and politics.

Amnesty International has stocked War on Terror in their catalogue under the banner of 'educational' for two years, while publications like the New Internationalist and The Guardian have emphasised the game's educational potential.

Journalist and documentary maker John Pilger has also shown his support and enthusiasm for the game, labeling it "extraordinary".

During 2010, the publishers of War on Terror started speaking publicly in higher education circles about the game and the role that games have to play in politics and activism; this appears to be an area in which they are gaining increasing recognition.

In February 2011, War on Terror appeared on its first major syllabus. The game formed part of a core module in "Political Simulation and Gaming" run by Richard Barbrook, at the University of Westminster.

In 2020, War on Terror was put on display at IWM North as a part of the contemporary conflict collection.

== Awards ==
2007

- "Top Ten Historical Board Games of 2007" in the annual Origins Awards.

2012

- The iOS app of War on Terror placed 3rd in the best board game category of the "2011 Best Apps Ever Awards".

== Reviews ==
- Pyramid
