= MJM =

MJM may refer to:

- Mbuji Mayi Airport, Democratic Republic of the Congo
- MJM Entertainment Group, an American media production and promotion company
- MJM International, a company set up by British businesswoman Michelle Mone
- Medebur language of New Guinea (ISO 639-3 code: mjm)
- MJM Australia, importer and former manufacturer of games
- MJM Music PL, Polish record label
- Michael Jackson's Moonwalker, 1990 video game
