= Majora =

Majora may refer to:

- Majora (toy company), a Portuguese toy manufacturer
- The Legend of Zelda: Majora's Mask a video game from the Nintendo's Legend of Zelda series
  - Majora (The Legend of Zelda) the entity that possesses the eponymous mask in the game
