= The Art of War (disambiguation) =

The Art of War is a highly influential ancient Chinese military treatise attributed to Sun Tzu.

The Art of War may also refer to:

== General topics ==
- Warfare, the art of war
- Military art, war art; art with a military subject matter, regardless of its style or medium
- military treatise, a treatise on the art of war
- martial arts, combat arts, fighting arts, war arts

== Literature ==
- The Art of War: Five Years in Formula One
- The Art of War (comics), a 2012 graphic novel by Kelly Roman and Michael DeWeese
- The Art of War, a 2016 novel by Stephen Coonts

=== Military treatises ===
- Sun Bin's Art of War, a Chinese text by an alleged descendant of Sun Tzu
- The Art of War (Machiavelli book), a 1521 book by Niccolò Machiavelli
- L'Art de la Guerre, a manuscript by Jacques François de Chastenet de Puységur, published in 1748 by his son
- The Methods of the Sima or The Art of War, a military treatise by Sima Rangju
- Summary of the Art of War, a 19th-century treatise by Baron Antoine-Henri Jomini
- The Art of War, a compilation of 20th-century writings on warfare by Mao Zedong

== Music ==
- The Art of War (Bone Thugs-n-Harmony album) (1997)
- The Art of War (Sabaton album)
- The Art of War (EP), an EP by Vader
- "The Art of War", a song from the score of the film Battleship
- "Art of War", a song by We the Kings from the 2013 album Somewhere Somehow
- "The Art of War", a song from the 2007 video game Team Fortress 2

== Other uses ==
- The Arts of War, two statues in Washington, D.C.
- The Art of War (film), a 2000 action film starring Wesley Snipes
- Art of War Fighting Championship, a mixed martial arts organization based in Beijing, China
- Cossacks: Art of War, a 2001 real-time strategy computer game
- The Art of War, a 2008 board game set in the fictional universe the Legend of the Five Rings
- "The Art of War", an episode of Exosquad
- TV's The Art of War, a 1987 South Korean sitcom starring Seo In-seok and Jang Yong

== See also ==
- The Ancient Art of War, a 1984–1993 series of computer games by Evryware released
- The Operational Art of War, a series of computer wargames
- The War of Art (disambiguation)
- War (disambiguation)
- Art (disambiguation)
