= Carnage Gaming Convention =

- Status: Active, in-person for 2021
- Genre: Multi-Genre Gaming Convention
- Venue: Killington Grand Resort
- Location: Killington, Vermont
- Country: United States
- Inaugurated: 1998
- Attendance: ~1000 attendees
- Organizer: Carnage Gaming
- Website: http://www.carnagecon.com/

Carnage is a multi-genre table-top gaming convention based in the Upper Valley of Vermont / New Hampshire. It typically covers all genres of tabletop gaming, like board games, role-playing games, CCGs, LARPs and historical and fantasy miniatures.

Carnage was featured on WCAX's The :30 on November 1, 2011.

== History ==
First held in 1998 in West Lebanon, Carnage grew from the motivation "to give New England gamers a place where they could come, be themselves, enjoy their games and have fun." After its inaugural year in New Hampshire, Carnage based itself on the Vermont side of the Upper Valley, moving to Brownsville, VT in 1999 and then to Fairlee in 2003. In 2012, the organizers announced Carnage 2013 would be held at the Killington Grand Hotel. Carnage was once again on the move in 2019 with the organizers deciding to move the convention to the Mt Snow Resort in Dover, Vermont for the 2020 interaction. This move would allow the convention to continue to expand and locate it more centrally in New England. The COVID 19 pandemic postponed the planned move with the 2020 edition of Carnage being held instead as a virtual event; the change in venue will instead occur in 2021 for the 24th year of the convention.

=== Past conventions ===
- Carnage at the Crossroads, November 6–8, 1998, Radisson Inn, West Lebanon, NH
- Carnage on the Mountain 2, November 5–7, 1999, Ascutney Mountain Resort, Brownsville, VT
- Carnage on the Mountain 3, November 3–5, 2000, Ascutney Mountain Resort, Brownsville, VT
- Carnage on the Mountain 4, November 2–4, 2001, Ascutney Mountain Resort, Brownsville, VT
- Carnage on the Mountain 5, November 1–3, 2002, Ascutney Mountain Resort, Brownsville, VT
- Carnage by the Lake 6, October 24–26, 2003, Lake Morey Resort, Fairlee, VT
- Camp Carnage 7, November 5–7, 2004, Lake Morey Resort, Fairlee, VT
- Carnage 8: Signs Point to Carnage, November 11–13, 2005, Lake Morey Resort, Fairlee, VT
- Carnage 9 From Outer Space, November 10–12, 2006, Lake Morey Resort, Fairlee, VT
- Carnage, We’re Hangin’ 10, November 2–4, 2007, Lake Morey Resort, Fairlee, VT
- This Is Carnage: We Go to 11!, November 7–9, 2008, Lake Morey Resort, Fairlee, VT
- Carnage 12: Nothing But Carnage, November 6–8, 2009, Lake Morey Resort, Fairlee, VT
- Carnage the 13th, November 5–7, 2010, Lake Morey Resort, Fairlee, VT
- Carnage in Wonderland 14: Down the Rabbit Hole, November 4–6, 2011, Lake Morey Resort, Fairlee, VT - Host of 2011 North American Diplomacy Championships (DipCon)
- Carnage Noir 15, November 2–4, 2012, Lake Morey Resort, Fairlee, VT focused on a film noir/pulp fiction theme.
- Carnage on the Mountain 16, November 8–10, 2013, Killington Grand Hotel in Killington, Vermont
- A Fistful of Carnage, November 7–9, 2014, Killington Grand Hotel in Killington, Vermont
- Carnage in the Lost World, November 6–8, 2015, Killington Grand Hotel in Killington, Vermont
- Carnage Royale, November 4–6, 2016, Killington Grand Hotel in Killington, Vermont
- Carnage XX, November 3–5, 2017, Killington Grand Hotel in Killington, Vermont
- Carnage 21: A Space Odyssey, November 2-4, 2018, Killington Grand Hotel in Killington, Vermont
- Carnage 22 was held at the Killington Grand Hotel in Killington, Vermont, November 1–3, 2019. The theme for 2019 was an homage to Joseph Heller's novel Catch-22.
- Carnage 23 was held as a virtual convention due to the COVID 19 pandemic November 7-8, 2020.
- Carnage 24: Lost in the Carnage Triangle was held at the Mount Snow Resort in Dover, Vermont, November 5-7, 2021.
- Carnage 25: Silver Jubilee was held at the Mount Snow Resort in Dover, Vermont, November 4-6, 2022.
- Carnage 26, was held at the Killington Grand Hotel in Killington, Vermont, October 27-29, 2023
- Carnage 27, was held at the Killington Grand Hotel in Killington, Vermont, November 1-3, 2024
- Carnage 28, was held at the Killington Grand Hotel in Killington, Vermont, October 24-26, 2025
- Carnage 29, will be held at the Killington Grand Hotel in Killington, Vermont, October 16-18, 2026

Previous themes have included: the wild west, horror, B-movie sci-fi, heavy metal (a la Spinal Tap), surf, Alice in Wonderland and summer camp.

== Events ==
Carnage accepts submissions from GMs, or game masters, volunteering to host sessions of games across the tabletop genres. Typical fare includes board games of the Eurogame and Amerigame varieties, collectible card games like Magic: the Gathering and Legend of the 5 Rings, boffer and dialogue-driven LARPs, miniatures in fantastic and historical milieux, and role-playing games, including ongoing campaigns in living worlds and standalone adventures. Recently Carnage has started including learn-to events such as introduction classes and miniature painting and game creation seminars.

Carnage also offers a number of non-gaming events such are "sip'n paints", needle felting and a steam punk fashion show.

Other notable events at Carnage have included the Carnage Accords, an annual Diplomacy tournament; a computer-assisted game trade known as a "math trade"; the Centuries of Conflict umbrella theme for many historical miniatures; dramatic readings and panels held by convention guests; and most recently at Carnage Noir, a geek pub quiz sponsored by Gygax magazine.

In 2022 Carnage is slated to be the host convention for the Diplomacy World Championships (World DipCon).

== Guests ==
Carnage has hosted a number of guests of honor from the gaming industry and literary communities. Past game-related guests have included: James Carpio, Ann Dupuis, Walter Hunt, Tracy Hurley, Steffan O'Sullivan, Jeff Talanian, Brad Younie, and members of Steve Jackson Games' Men In Black demo team. In 2019 Carnage welcomed David Phipps, creator of Pulp Alley, a skirmish level miniatures game.

Authors have included C. J. Henderson, Howard Coffin and Lisa Comstock.

Artist Don Higgins has made several appearances.
