= Flibbix =

Board game

Flibbix is a dynamic board game by Merillian for two to five players, in which players build their own game board using magnetic game board tiles, check off custom rules on a "Make your own Rules" sheet, and then play.

Because the game board and rules can be changed before and during each game, players have a large number of board game designs and rule set options that significantly affect how their game will play. The tiles are reusable and the game comes with multiple rule sheets, so it is possible to play the game repeatedly, each time with a different game board and different set of rules. Players can choose to use all, or just some, of the included cards, so game play can be further customized by the players' choice of cards.

== Contents ==
Flibbix comes with 45 magnetic game board tiles, 40 cards, five game pieces, 50 double-sided rule sheets, one six-sided die, one pencil, quickstart sheet, and a game guide.

== Building a Game Board ==
Flibbix tiles have embedded magnets which allow them to connect in almost any design or order that the players choose. Each tile has sides with positive and negative polarity (the red and green sides of each tile), so that players are given a visual indicator of how tiles should connect to each other. Each tile is double sided and there is frequently a significance between the pairing of each side of a specific tile. For example, an "Extra Turn" tile has "Lose a Turn" on the opposite side. "Move Ahead 5" has "Go Back 5" on the opposite side. A "Right Turn" changes to "Left Turn" on the opposite side.

Because game board tiles can be connected in almost any order, players can build game boards that vary the look and play of each game dramatically. A game board can be in the shape of a letter, a straight line, or zig zag. In addition to changing the aesthetic look of a game board, building the game board allows players to significantly alter the way the game plays. For example, if a "Jump to Green Space" tile is placed in the middle of the game, and a "Green Space" tile is placed at the end of the game path, landing on "Jump to Green" would be advantageous to the player who lands on that tile. On the other hand, if the "Green Space" tile were placed at the beginning of the game board, players would try to avoid landing on the "Jump to Green" tile. Likewise, if players choose to populate their board game exclusively with tiles that send players back in the game, or cause players to lose turns, game-play will be different from if they chose to also use tiles which move players ahead, or give players extra turns.

The most basic method of creating a game board is for players to collaborate and build a game board together. However, there are other building methods including "Draw a Tile" and "Roll a Tile" that make game board creation more competitive and/or more random in nature. Some of these are specified in the Game Guide which comes with the game, but players could also devise their own method of building a game board using the game's tiles.Flibbix Game Guide. Merillian. May 2008. pp. 11–12.

== Making Board Game Rules ==
Before playing, players choose rules on a "Make your own Rules" sheet, included with the game. Many of the rules are check-off options which affect game play elements such as which player goes first, or whether an exact roll is required to land on the "Finish" tile. Players can also define what happens when someone lands on "Custom Tile" or draws a "Custom Card." When a player lands on a "Custom Tile" during play, they must perform the action specified on the "Custom Tile" section of the "Make your own Rules" sheet. This can be a directly game-related action such as "Move Back 5" or a more socially-focused action, such as "Sing a song as off key as possible and get an extra turn."

Rules are generally created by, or at least agreed to, by all players before playing the game. However, if a player draws the "Break a Rule" card during the game, they are allowed to change one game rule on the rule sheet.

== Playing the Game ==
The goal of the game is to be the first person to progress through the game path and get to the "Finish" tile. Players roll the die on their turn, and move the number of spaces that they rolled. However, their move may be modified by a card/tile that they have already drawn or landed on, a card or tile drawn/landed on by another player, by landing on the same space as another player, by their custom rules, or by the tile that their roll specifies they land on. Players perform the "action" on a tile when they land on it, and follow the rules defined on their rule sheet.

However, during game play, the game board is dynamic and may change in a number of ways. If a player lands on a "Tile Swap" tile, that player can choose to swap the location of any two unoccupied tiles on the board, with the exception of the "Start" or "Finish" tiles. In doing so, players can try to change the game board to their advantage by moving a tile ahead of them that they wish to land on, or moving a tile in front of another player that they wish the other player to land on. If a player lands on a "Tile Flip" tile, they may choose to flip over any tile on the game board that is unoccupied, as long as it doesn't interrupt the path of the game (such as by turning over a turn tile to break the game path). In doing so, a player can turn over a "Lose a Turn" to expose "Extra Turn," for example, and try to increase their chance of gaining an extra turn instead of losing a turn. Cards that players draw can affect the game board as well. For example, a "Swap & Flip Start & Finish" card tells users to swap the "Start and Finish" tiles. After this, game play suddenly goes backwards and the player who was last is now leading the game. [Flibbix How to Play Sheet]. Merillian. May 2008.

== Game Cards ==
Flibbix game cards are drawn whenever a player lands on a "Draw Card" tile. The "Make your own Rules" sheet can also specify that users draw a card when they roll a special number, such as one. Cards are designated in three categories:

- "Play Now" must be played immediately
- "Play Next Turn" must be played on the player's next turn
- "Play Whenever" can be played at any time the player chooses.

A Flibbix card can:

- Modify a user's turn (such as a "Fast Lane" card that doubles a player's roll)
- Change the player's position on the board (such as "Switch with Opponent" or "Move Back 5")
- Change the game board (such as "Tile Flip" which allows a player to flip over a tile)
- Offer safety or protection from a card, tile, or rule
- Be a social card which encourages players to interact with each other in some way

== Game Scale and Style ==
Because the game can be customized by players, the game focus and play style varies dramatically depending on the rules, cards, and tiles chosen. A short game board could be created that uses no cards, and has simple rules, for a simple Roll-and-Move style game. This could be played by young children. Conversely, with complex rules and a more elaborate board and cards, the game could be customized to be more entertaining or challenging for adults. Game cards and tiles include elements from a number of game categories such as Party or Family Games ("Three of a Kind," "Number Favorites," or "Rhyme Master" cards), Games of Physical Skill ("Human Spinner" card), and Strategy (game board building and modification choices).

== Awards ==
- Seal of Approval Award from The National Parenting Center
- NAPPA Gold Award from Dominion Parenting Media
- Parents' Choice Silver Honor Award Winner from Parents' Choice
- Mom's Best Award from the Mom's Best Network
- 2008 Preferred Choice Award and listed as a finalist for Toy of the Year by Creative Child Magazine
- TDmonthly Innovations 2008 Award from Toy Directory Monthly Magazine
- Listed as one of the Top 10 Games at American International Toy Fair '08 Game Zone

== Flibbix Puzzler ==
Merillian also released an iPhone-optimized web game titled "Flibbix Puzzler" with artwork based on the Flibbix board game. Game play is very different from the Flibbix board game, but is titled similarly since it uses Flibbix board game illustrations as elements of the web game.
