= Bookchase =

Board game

- Designers: Tony Davis
- Publishers: Art Meets Matter
- Publication: 2007
- Players: 2–6
- Setup time: 5 minutes
- Playing time: from 10 minutes to about 2 hours
- Chance: Medium (dice rolling, card drawing, luck)
- Age range: 5 upwards
- Skills: General knowledge, popular culture, simple knowledge; such as guessing, awareness of popular books and strategy social skills negotiation

Bookchase is a 2007 board game published by Art Meets Matter. Players compete to acquire six small books for their bookshelf. They do this by partly by answering multiple-choice questions, partly by visiting special spaces on the board: The Bookshop, The Book Corner, The Library and also by chance events triggered by the turn of an Award or Sentence card.

Each player takes turns moving round the board until one player has acquired six books: one of each of six categories. Once the player has a book shelf with six books they head for the centre space and if they arrive with book shelf intact they win. The game's designer Tony Davis describes the game as having "elements of Trivial Pursuit and Monopoly".

The board game was first launched and played at The Hay Festival of Literature in 2007. It was later republished as The Great Penguin Bookchase.

== Equipment ==
Each player is represented by a small coloured bookshelf. This is moved around the board according to the roll of two dice. Each bookshelf can accommodate up to six small books. Each book is colour-coded to represent a category of books: Sci-fi and Fantasy, Crime and Thrillers, Poetry and Plays, Children and Fun, Travel and Adventure, Classics and Modern.

Items in the standard edition are:

- The board
- 6 different coloured bookshelves
- 36 books - six of each category colour
- A set of small labels (or Dust jackets) - optional for use on the small books
- 1200 multiple-choice question cards
- 42 Award & Sentence cards
- 2 dice
- Rules

== Variations in play ==
Depending on type, age and skill level of players a number of variations of play are possible. The game is designed to allow player customisation and the creation of house rules. Variations include: Kids, Dash, Expert, and Collector.
