= The Ungame =

Non-competitive conversation board game

- A recent version of The Ungame, featuring the main board, cards, pieces, and one die
- Designers: Rhea Zakich
- Publishers: Talicor
- Publication: 1973; 53 years ago
- Genres: Board game
- Players: 2-6
- Playing time: 25+ minutes
- Chance: High
- Age range: 5+

The Ungame is a non-competitive conversation board game created by Rhea Zakich in 1972 and published in 1973. In the game, players move around the board with the aid of a die and answer questions about themselves on cards, while the other players must listen and respond only when prompted.

== Gameplay ==
The board is laid out as an endless loop of spaces with no finish line. To begin the game, a deck of question cards is chosen between two options, lighthearted or serious. It is shuffled and placed face-down on the board. Each player in turn rolls a die, moves their marker along the path according to the number rolled, and follows the instructions corresponding to the three types of destination. These spaces correspond to:

- Drawing the top card from the deck and answering the question on it,
- Asking a question to another player or commenting on something they said earlier,
- Obeying movement directions if they apply to the player, such as: "if you feel "Stressed Out", go to Sinking Ship".

Players must remain silent except when taking their turn or answering a question put to them. The game ends at the players' discretion, typically once an agreed-upon time limit has been reached, and has no winner or loser.

== History ==
In 1970, Rhea Zakich, a mother from Garden Grove, California who had grown up during the Great Depression in an emotionally distant family, developed polyps on her vocal cords, forcing her not to speak for three months before her recovery. During her illness, her children and husband stopped talking to her, and she regretted not engaging with them emotionally when she had been able to talk.

As a remedy, she wrote down questions that she wanted her family to ask her on paper cards, later turning the cards into a makeshift game by adding a hand-drawn board and using pieces from a copy of Monopoly. As well as the cards with more personal questions, she added more fun questions such as, "what's your favorite colour?" Initially, she arranged the deck so that she would get the questions she wanted to answer. However, one of her sons shuffled the deck.

Upon their first playthrough, her husband revealed for the first time how frightened her illness made him; her son, a bright student, expressed how he hated the constant pressure to perform well in school; the other son talked about how his peers' teasing made him feel. They let their neighbors borrow the game and she began to make copies before writing to game manufacturers and educational supply companies in an attempt to publish the game. She was declined by all the companies she contacted, who cited its non-competitivity and claimed that people didn't talk about their emotions.

In 1972, a boy from Zakich's neighbourhood found a half-finished copy of the game in the trash, that she had made an error with; his parents approached her, willing to remortgage their house to put the game into production. They founded The Ungame Company, and Zakich, who had recovered her voice, gave talks about the game at schools and then notified local toy shops that people would be searching to buy the game afterwards. The company gained the rights to the game's catchphrase, "tell it like it is".

There were two attempts to adapt the game into a television game show, both of which failed. One succeeded in the creation of a pilot episode, however it included the host pointing out wrong answers, which made Zakich "sick". The other proposed show involved a life-sized game board with giant foam rubber dice.

By 1985, The Ungame had over one million sales. By 1986, many out-dated expressions for the time such as "hang-ups" and "do your own thing" were changed for more up-to-date terms. As of 2025, more than four million copies have been sold.

== Variations ==
The Ungame has a number of variations and expansions available. Many of these were available in 1987.

=== Full size board versions ===
- The Ungame
- The Ungame Catholic Version

=== Pocket versions ===
These include cards only in a smaller travel sized box.

- All Ages
- Kids
- Families
- Teens
- Couples
- Christian
- Seniors
- 20-Somethings

== Reception ==
The Lewiston Journal called The Ungame "Personal Pursuit", comparing it to the trivia board game Trivial Pursuit. In 1987, The Afro-American touted the game as a remedy to "the shredding of the family in Black America", and saw the game as a solution to violent toys and video games, as well as to the depiction of violence against women in media.

== See also ==
- Conversation games
