= Allan B. Calhamer =

Board game designer (1931–2013)

- Born: Allan Brian Calhamer; December 7, 1931; Hinsdale, Illinois, US
- Died: February 25, 2013 (aged 81); La Grange, Illinois, US
- Education: Harvard University
- Occupations: Game Designer, mail carrier, researcher
- Known for: inventing the board game Diplomacy
- Spouse: Hilda
- Children: 2

Allan Brian Calhamer (December 7, 1931 – February 25, 2013) was an American board game designer, best known for his game Diplomacy.

== Career ==
Calhamer speculated that his original inspiration for Diplomacy was an article in Life magazine about the Congress of Vienna he read in 1945 at age 13. Gordon Leavitt, a childhood friend of Calhamer's recounted how, when they were boys in La Grange Park, Illinois, he and Calhamer "discovered in the attic a geography book that showed a map of Europe before World War I with the Austro-Hungarian Empire and the old boundaries." Calhamer received his bachelor's degree from Harvard University in 1953, then began at Harvard Law School. Reading The Origins of the World War by professor Sidney Bradshaw Fay, whose class he attended, finally galvanized Calhamer. In 1954, while still enrolled, he developed a game of strategy and alliances that put seven players in control of the major powers of the pre-World War I era. He quit law school after one year, and Sylvania's Applied Research Laboratory in Waltham, Massachusetts hired him as a systems analyst. He also worked as tour guide for the Statue of Liberty during this period.

In 1959, Calhamer published his game as Diplomacy and printed 500 copies. After selling all of them in six months, he licensed the game to a publisher, with Games Research releasing its first edition in 1961. Over the years, Diplomacy has been published in North America by Games Research, Avalon Hill, Hasbro, and Renegade Game Studios, and has been published in several different languages in other nations by various publishers. Calhamer's original face-to-face board game has also been played by mail since 1963. More recently, there are internet Diplomacy games, games run through email or online with or without a human game master. Calhamer later invented two other games, but neither achieved anything like the success of Diplomacy.

Calhamer wrote a book, Calhamer on Diplomacy: The Boardgame "Diplomacy" and Diplomatic History, but the game did not provide him with a living. In the 1990s he retired from working as a mail carrier and lived his last years in La Grange Park.

Calhamer also published a game of four-dimensional exploration, called "Hyper-Space." The instructions are at the Internet Archive.

== Legacy ==
Calhamer died of heart and kidney failure on February 25, 2013, at Adventist-La Grange Memorial Hospital in La Grange, Illinois. Mike Webb, vice president of marketing and data services for Alliance Game Distributors, said in a posthumous interview, "In many ways, the hobby-game industry as we know it owes its existence to Allan Calhamer" thanks to Diplomacy's numerous gameplay innovations, specifically the ability to negotiate and deceive other players.

== Personal life ==
Calhamer met his future wife, Hilda Morales, in New York. The couple were married 45 years and had two daughters together, Tatiana and Selenne.

== Articles written by Calhamer ==
- Military Intelligence (1960)
- On Strengthening the hand of Austria-Hungary (1960)
- The Tactics of Diplomacy (1961)
- A Dozen Years of Diplomacy (1966)
- On the Play of Postal Diplomacy by Allan Calhamer (1966)
- The Invention of Diplomacy (1974)
- Across the Whole Board (1974)
- Objectives Other Than Winning (1974)
- Introduction to Diplomacy (1975)
- The Coast of Moscow
