= The War of Art =

The War of Art (a word play on The Art of War) may refer to:

- The War of Art (book), 2002 book by Steven Pressfield
- The War of Art (American Head Charge album), 2001 album by metal band American Head Charge
- The War of Art (Badawi album), 2022 album by electronic artist Badawi
- "The War of Art" (The Simpsons), 2014 episode of The Simpsons

== See also ==
- War art, art featuring warfare
- The Art of War (disambiguation)
