= JKLM Games =

Board game publisher

JKLM Games was a board game publishing company based in the United Kingdom. The company was placed into voluntary liquidation on March 10, 2010.

== Published games ==
As of 2008, JKLM games has published:

- 1860: Railways on the Isle of Wight, an 18XX game designed by Mike Hutton
- Celtic Quest designed by Nigel Buckle
- City and Guilds designed by Steve Kingsbury
- Constellation designed by Hans van Halteren
- Dwarves designed by Markus Welbourne
- Fruit Bandits designed by Ian Vincent
- Junkyard Races designed by John Yianni
- Kings Progress designed by Steve Kingsbury
- Media Mogul designed by Richard Huzzey
- Kogge designed by Andreas Steding
- On the Underground designed by Sebastian Bleasdale, co-published with Rio Grande Games
- Third World Debt designed by Dave Thorby
- Tulipmania designed by Scott Nicholson
- Whisky Race designed by Andreas Steding
- Presidential Election designed by Richard Huzzey
