= Diplomacy (1984 video game) =

- Developer: Avalon Hill
- Publisher: Avalon Hill
- Release: 1984
- Genre: Strategy

Diplomacy is a 1984 video game based on a classical board game Diplomacy. It falls in the category of a turn-based, strategy, war game. It was programed by Tony Smith (also co-designer), with Alexander Martin (also co-designer) and Nicole Baikaloff doing the graphics.

== Publication ==
Avalon Hill released a computer game version of Diplomacy in 1984 for the IBM PC.

== Reception ==
Family Computing (November 1984) praised how the computer does the bookkeeping for the player, in an advantage over the board game.

PC Magazine (Feb 19, 1985) found the game easier and more fun to play than the board game and that the game moves faster.

Robert Alonso for Electronic Games (March 1985) considered it an improvement over the board game, and commented that its "excellence and potential longevity is sure to please any strategy game lover."

In 1990 Computer Gaming World gave the game four out of five stars, stating that despite the weak computer opponents the presence of the board game's mechanics was sufficient for a favorable recommendation. In 1993 the magazine gave it three stars.
