= Diplomacy World =

- Editor: Doug Kent
- Categories: Board Gaming, 20th Century Europe
- Frequency: Quarterly
- First issue: January 1974
- Final issue: ongoing
- Country: United States
- Website: Diplomacy World

Diplomacy World is a quarterly publication fanzine about the play of the board game Diplomacy. It was first published in 1973 starting with issue #1 of DW which was edited by Walter W. Buchanan and published in January 1974. All of the back issue of DW are available on the DW website. DW is considered the flagship zine of the Diplomacy hobby.

It was an extension of Buchanan's Hoosier Archives which have been archived (along with many other Diplomacy zines or Dipzines) in the popular culture section of the Bowling Green State University by Jamie McQuinn.

DW is the oldest continuously published commentary (e.g. non-playing) Diplomacy zine. Currently, it has over 170 issues published and is published quarterly online on January 1, April 1, July 1 and October 1. The current managing editor is Doug Kent since the death of former editor and co-editor Jim Burgess.

After DW issue #96 the zine is only published on the web and is no longer a postal zine.

== Issue contents ==
Each issue contains anywhere from 50-75 pages of original articles on the play of the game of Diplomacy as well as its variants (a variant is game of Diplomacy where the rules or map or both have been changed.) DW also features columns about various conventions where people gather to play the game, known as "face-to-face" (ftf) play. Every issue has an interview with a well known hobby member, an editorial, a letter column and an advice column. DW often publishes rule or map variants of Diplomacy as well as designer's and historical notes as well as strategy and tactics articles on the variant as well as other variants.

== See also ==
- Diplomacy (the game)
