= Art Meets Matter =

Art Meets Matter is a design collective exploring the relationship between cultural iconography and objects and materials.

Created by Royal College of Art graduate Tony Davis the company has explored iconic sources as diverse at the London Underground Diagram or Tube map, London's A-Z Map and the original book cover designs of Penguin Paperbacks from the 1930s. They have also pioneered a philosophy of eco-friendly design and recycling.

One of their major design projects was to link the iconography and original design of the Penguin Books from the 1930s to prosaic objects like mugs and deckchairs. Art Meets Matter explores the relationship between use and context. For example, they create a utilitarian object like a deckchair which visually references an original Penguin Book but is also relevant to the use of the object when reading.

They are also publisher of Bookchase, the book-based board game.
