= Wargames Factory =

American manufacturer of miniature wargaming pieces

Wargames Factory, LLC
- Company type: Limited liability company (LLC)
- Industry: Miniature wargaming manufacturer
- Founded: 2007
- Headquarters: 7224 North 63rd Street, Longmont, Colorado, United States
- Key people: George Sivy

Wargames Factory was an American plastic miniature manufacturer that opened in 2007. It specialized in highly detailed, multi-part models in hard plastic for wargaming. Wargames Factory produced models mostly in the 28 millimetres (1.1 in) range, but did other scales as well. It was unique in the way it chose the subject of its miniatures, using what it called the Liberty and Union League to produce models submitted by consumers.

== Production process ==
The company used a "direct to digital" approach which did not use an original physical sculpt. This was unlike many other plastic wargames figure manufacturers who sculpted the figure at three times the eventual size (called three-ups), then digitally scanned and reduced them for production. In the design process the company used the software Freeform from Sensible (which in 2012 was bought by Geomagic).

== History ==
Wargames Factory was established as a Limited Liability Company in 2007, managed by Anthony Reidy. The company entered partnership with the plastic injection molding company Ghost Studio. In 2010 the company was taken over by its partner with George Sivy as new manager. The Massachusetts-based LLC was dissolved on April 19, 2011 as the business moved to Colorado.

2012 saw the company taking on manufacturing projects for several miniature wargaming companies. They produce models for InMediaRes Productions' imprint Catalyst Game Labs boardgame Leviathan's, first released on GenCon in 2011. They also produce lines of miniatures for DreamForge-Games and Scarab Miniatures. In January 2016 Warlord Games announced that they had "entered into partnership with Wargames Factory to exclusively distribute their plastic wargames kits worldwide."

== Liberty and Union League ==
The name Liberty and Union League was taken from the protests of the early American colonists and the raising of liberty poles.

Ideas are submitted by customers and then wait for approval by the Wargames Factory staff. Once the idea is approved as being viable it is listed on the Liberty and Union League, and on the Wargames Factory message boards on the company's website.

After its listing, people are then able to pre-order sprues of that idea for a miniature. The pre-orders are to gauge the interest in a sprue idea, and once they reach a thousand the models are put into production.

== Current miniature ranges ==
=== Might of Rome (28mm) ===
- Ancient German Warband
- Ancient German Cavalry
- Caesar's Legions - Late Republican Roman Legionaries
- Celt Cavalry - Gallic or Briton Barbarian Cavalry
- Celt Chariots - Gallic or Briton Barbarian Chariots
- Celt Warbands - Gallic or Briton Barbarian Warriors
- EIR Cavalry - Early Imperial Roman Auxiliary Cavalry
- Numidians - North African Warriors

=== War of Empires (28mm) ===
- British Firing Line - Colonial British Infantry
- Zulu Warriors - Zulu Warriors

=== Alien Suns (Sci-fi) (28mm) ===
- Shock Troop Greatcoats - eighteen multi-part sci-fi troopers
- Shock Troop Heavy Weapons- 3 x heavy weapons & crews

=== Dark Futures (Sci-fi/Fantasy) (28mm) ===
- Zombies! - Multi-part Zombies (male)
- Zombie Vixens - Multi-part Zombies (female)
- Apocalypse Survivors:Men - Multi-part Living Humans with weapons (male)
- Apocalypse Survivors:Women - Multi-part Living Humans with weapons (female)

=== Hammer of the Gods (Dark Ages Britain & Northern Europe) (28mm) ===
- Saxon Fyrd - Unarmoured Saxon warriors
- Saxon Thegns - Armoured Saxon warriors
- Viking Bondi - Unarmoured Viking warriors
- Viking Huscarls - Armoured Viking warriors

=== Horse & Musket (Gunpowder Warfare) (28mm) ===
- War of Spanish Succession Artillery
- War of Spanish Succession Cavalry
- War of Spanish Succession Infantry
- American War of Independence - British Infantry
- American War of Independence - Continental Infantry
- American War of Independence - Colonial Militia
- American War of Independence - Woodland Indians

=== Legacy of the Greeks (Ancient Greece & Persia) (28mm) ===
- Amazon Warriors
- Heavy Armour Greek Hoplites
- Persian Cavalry
- Persian Infantry

=== Rising Sun (16th Century Japan) (28mm) ===
- Ashigaru Missile Troops - Infantry armed with bows and arquebus (fire-arms)
- Ashigaru Yari Troops - Infantry armed with spears
- Samurai Warriors - Samurai warriors (on foot)
- Samurai Cavalry - Samurai warriors (mounted)

=== World War Two (1939-1945) (28mm & 15mm) ===
- WW2 German Infantry (Late War) - 28mm
- WW2 US Infantry (Late War) - 28mm
- WW2 German Infantry Company - 15mm (1/100 scale)- contains 84 figures
- WW2 Red Army (Soviet Infantry Platoon) - 28mm
- WW2 American Rifle Company- 15mm (1/100 scale)- contains 92 figures

=== Myths & Legends (Fantasy) (28mm) ===
- Orc Warriors
- Skeleton Warriors

== Old Soldier Recycling Program ==
In the past Wargames Factory ran a plastic sprue recycling program in which environmentally conscious wargamers could send in their unused plastic sprues for recycling. The factory could then melt these down and use them in new frames of miniatures. As an incentive for participation in the program, the company entered the names of the participants into a raffle to win Wargames Factory products. This program has since been discontinued and no longer recycles old sprues, however Wargames Factory encourages wargamers to recycle their old sprues locally.
