= Merillian =

American board game company

Merillian is a US company that makes board games, including the build-a-board game set Flibbix and the Flibbix Puzzler iPhone-optimized web game. It is located in the Puget Sound near Seattle in Duvall, Washington and was founded in 2006 by CEO Jason Ivan.

== Published games ==
- Flibbix (2008): Flibbix is a build-a-board game set in which players can build their own board game using magnetic game board tiles, choose their own rules on a "Make your own Rules" sheet, and then play. Unlike many board games, the Flibbix game board and rules are not fixed. Every time the game is played, the game board and rules are different, so the game will play differently. Also unlike many board games, the game board and rules are dynamic and can be changed during the game. Changes are caused by players landing on special tiles, or drawing special cards, which allow them to move tiles, flip them over, or change rules on the rule sheet.
- Flibbix Puzzler (2008): Flibbix Puzzler is an iPhone optimized web game in which players try to clear a screen of squares by selecting like-colored groups of squares and then clicking again to remove the group. The game is titled similarly to the Flibbix Board Game even though game play is significantly different, because game squares contain artwork based on the board game's illustrations.

== Press & Awards ==
- Flibbix awarded Seal of Approval from The National Parenting Center
- Flibbix awarded Parents' Choice Silver Honor Award from Parents' Choice
- Flibbix awarded NAPPA Gold Award from Dominion Parenting Media
- Flibbix given Mom's Best Award from the Mom's Best Network
- Flibbix given TDmonthly Innovations 2008 Award from Toy Directory Monthly Magazine
- Flibbix wins 2008 Preferred Choice Award and listed as a finalist for Toy of the Year by Creative Child Magazine
- Flibbix Listed as one of the Top 10 Games at American International Toy Fair '08 Game Zone
- Flibbix featured by Washington Post

== Meaning of the Name ==
The name "Merillian" comes from the words "Million," "Merry," and "Millennium." Together, it means "Lots of fun for a really long time."
