= Agglo =

Hong Kong toy supplier

- Industry: Toys and games
- Founded: 1969
- Defunct: 2022
- Headquarters: Hong Kong, China
- Number of employees: 26 - 50 People
- Website: www.hktdc.com/sourcing/hk_company_directory.htm?companyid=1X03F4G8&locale=en

Agglo Corporation Limited was a private Hong Kong–based toy supplier founded in 1969. The company sourced toys ranging from low-price bulk products to large vehicle play sets. In its later years, the company made inroads into STEM educational toys. Along with sourcing products, Agglo designed products in-house and developed packaging specific to customer needs. In August 2022, the founder and CEO died. Agglo Corporation ceased operations shortly after.

They were a donor to The Toy Bank charity.

In 2003, sidewalk chalk manufactured by Agglo was subject to a recall due to its high lead level.
