= FSpace Publications =

Game company

- Company type: Sole proprietorship
- Industry: Role-playing game publisher
- Founded: 1991
- Headquarters: Lower Hutt, New Zealand
- Key people: Martin Rait, Aaron Barlow, Gary Ammundsen, Stephen Pritchard, Andrew Russell, Robert Bettelheim, Philip Warnes
- Products: FSpaceRPG, FED RPG
- Website: https://www.fspacerpg.com/

FSpace Publications is a role-playing game publisher founded in 1991. The company is an active publisher of science fiction role-playing products.

== History ==
FSpace Publications was originally established in New Zealand in 1991, originally publishing under the name Future Systems. It was an active part of New Zealand game publishing.

A series revolving around their game The Federation Science Fiction Roleplaying Game was published in the New Zealand gaming magazine Generals, Dragon and Dice, ISSN 1170-5787. Due to playtesters often referring to the game as "FED Space", the developers shortened the title to FSpace in 1994.

In 1995, FSpace Publications published the fanzine,The Meshan Saga, alongside the science-fiction role-playing game, Traveller. The final issue was completed in 1999. Copies of The Meshan Saga were previously housed with the National Archives in Wellington, New Zealand. This includes both physical copies and digital PDFs on CD-ROM, under ISSN 1174-8710. They are currently held in the Alexander Turnbull Library. In 2001, co-founder Martin Rait, began work on a small set of commercial books to be published by FSpace Publications for the Meshan Sector. In late 2002, the project was put on hold, while some minor work continued.

FSpace Publications released many of its Traveller supplements as repackaged generic science fiction role-playing game supplements, under the Far Encounters and Far Frontiers brands. They have since released a World War II naval war game called SeaLion Supremacy along with a 3D miniature line.

The team worked under contract to Jolly Roger Games to produce board game maps for Orcs at the Gates and Chopping Maul.

FSpace Publications have begun to release free materials on the Internet Archive, including copies of 'The Meshan Saga'

== Products ==
=== Role-playing games ===
- FSpaceRPG - A hard science fiction roleplaying game. First edition came out in 1995 and made its debut at the KapCon 1995 convention in Wellington.
- FED RPG - Repackaged version of the simpler development version of the game used prior to its revamp and rebrand

=== War games ===
- SeaLion Supremacy - A tabletop World War Two naval game, written by Philip Warnes.

=== Role-playing Game supplements ===
- Far Encounters - Travelleresque hard science fiction roleplaying game starships and adventures.
- Far Frontiers - Travelleresque hard science fiction roleplaying game world supplements.
