= Avalon Hill's Diplomacy =

1999 strategy video game

- Developer: Meyer/Glass Interactive
- Publisher: Hasbro Interactive
- Platform: Windows
- Release: NA: November 16, 1999
- Genre: Strategy
- Modes: Single-player, Multiplayer

Avalon Hill's Diplomacy is a strategy video game developed by Meyer/Glass Interactive and published by Hasbro Interactive under the MicroProse brand name in 1999. It is based on Avalon Hill's strategic board game Diplomacy.

== Reception ==
Reception

Aggregate score
Aggregator	Score
GameRankings	46%

Review scores
Publication	Score
AllGame	4.5/5
CNET Gamecenter	3/10
Computer Games Strategy Plus	1.5/5
Computer Gaming World	1.5/5
GameSpot	4/10
GameStar	41%
IGN	6.6/10
PC Accelerator	3/10
PC Zone	62%

The game received unfavorable reviews according to the review aggregation website GameRankings.
