= TerrorBull Games =

- Founded: October 2005; 19 years ago
- Founders: Andrew Sheerin; Andy Tompkins
- Headquarters: Cambridge, United Kingdom
- Website: www.terrorbull.co.uk

TerrorBull Games is an independent games studio based in Cambridge, UK. TerrorBull Games was founded in October 2005 by Andrew Sheerin and Andy Tompkins in order to self-publish their first board game, War on Terror. According to their own blog, TerrorBull approached several existing publishers with the game and found themselves "laughed out of the room". Starting their own game design and publishing company appeared to be the only path Sheerin and Tompkins could take.

== Releases ==
War on Terror, the boardgame (2006)

TerrorBull Games' mission statement says it intends to "grapple with the nasty things in life through the medium of the board game". Indeed, their first release, War on Terror, generated a large amount of controversy and opposition, with several UK Members of Parliament offering their (negative) opinion at the time. Opponents claimed that a board game is not a suitable platform for dealing with such issues.

Crunch, the game for utter bankers (2009)

Released in 2009, Crunch is a card game based on the credit crunch in which you play as the CEO of a bank. The aim is not to have the richest bank, but to have the biggest retirement fund. This is achieved by embezzling (hiding assets), or by playing bonus or event cards.

The Hen Commandments (2015)

Released with the help of a successful Kickstarter campaign, The Hen Commandments is a linguistic party game for 3-8 players (although the publishers claim they have played with entire classrooms) in which players work collaboratively to create a new religion based on the worship of a holy chicken who issues the eponymous commandments through a series of card decks containing words and phrases that fit together to make a dynamically-generated commandment. These commandments are always grammatically correct, though often absurd and inappropriate in content. The core game mechanic lies in players arguing over the true meaning behind these nonsensical proclamations.

== Games for Others ==
TerrorBull Games is regularly commissioned by charities and educational establishments to create persuasive games in the form of campaign games, educational games, classroom simulations and event games. A list of clients on the publisher's website cites Greenpeace, Amnesty International, SOAS (School for Oriental and African Studies), CAFOD (Catholic Agency for Overseas Development), Headway and the BFI (British Film Institute)

== Cultural impact ==
In the second part of Games Britannia, a three-part BBC documentary series on the history of games in Britain, aired in December 2009, TerrorBull Games were praised for their use of merging satire with gameplay. Presenter and historian, Benjamin Woolley, stated this was "unlike anything that had gone before" and suggested that TerrorBull Games could well be the future of the British board game industry, which has otherwise all but deteriorated.

In 2009, War on Terror was exhibited in the Berlin Kunstakademie as part of the Embedded Art exhibition.

TerrorBull's work can be found in the permanent collections of the following museums: The Imperial War Museum, The V&A Museum of Childhood, The Peace Museum (Bradford), The Bodleian Library (John Johnson collection of culturally valuable printed ephemera)

== Academic references ==
TerrorBull's work is frequently referenced in academic papers and books, as well as forming part of various university syllabuses in the UK. Most notably among these references are perhaps those found in the publications of games ethicist, Miguel Sicart, who states in Play Matters that Metakettle is "one of the most interesting political games ever made" (p.74).
