= The Art of War (comic book) =

2012 graphic novel

Publication information
- Publisher: Harper Perennial
- Format: Graphic novel
- Main character: Kelly Roman

Creative team
- Written by: Kelly Roman
- Penciller: Michael DeWeese
- Inker: Michael DeWeese
- Editor: Will Hinton

Collected editions
- The Art of War: A Graphic Novel: ISBN 978-0062103949

The Art of War is a graphic novel written and storyboarded by Kelly Roman with art by Michael DeWeese. The book was published as a paperback original by Harper Perennial on July 31, 2012. The graphic novel adapts Sun Tzu's original The Art of War into a science fiction story that follows an ex-soldier who works in a militarized financial world dominated by the Chinese government.

== Publication history ==
Author Kelly Roman was inspired to adapt The Art of War after "he sensed a growing national anxiety about China's hegemonic rise, and I wanted to transform the ancient text into something that explored this anxiety." He references the formation of China's first sovereign foreign wealth fund, the China Investment Corporation, in 2007 and the fund's subsequent $3 billion investment in the American private equity firm Blackstone as key events in The Art of War's genesis.

== Synopsis ==
The protagonist, Kelly Roman, served time in military prison for accidentally maiming the woman in his battalion that he was in love with. After being freed, Roman discovers his hometown in shambles and learns from his father that his brother Shane died while working for a company called Trench. Kelly travels to New York City to investigate and gets a job at Trench working for Shane's old boss, the brilliant and ruthless Sun Tzu, who manages China's investments around the world.

The United States invests all that remains of Medicare and Social Security with Trench in a last-ditch effort to avoid bankruptcy, and Sun Tzu uses Roman to help compete with a company called Vespoid that manages the investments of India and the Vatican Bank. A battle over a highly valuable and dangerous new technology ensues: a start up company called Controlled Black Hole Technologies has pioneered the use of industrial black holes. Vespoid and Trench augment their heavily armed investment bankers with myriad forms of drone technology and biotechnology to acquire the coveted black hole tech.

All the while, Roman keeps an illustrated diary in which he writes down all of Sun Tzu's teachings (The Art of War). Roman rises through the ranks of Trench and ultimately wins the opportunity to avenge his brother, redeem himself for disfiguring the woman he loves, and save the United States from bankruptcy—but at tremendous personal cost.

== Chinatown blood event ==
In May 2011, Kelly Roman and Michael Deweese staged a publicity stunt in New York's Chinatown during which they had their blood extracted in public and stamped on the covers of chapter samples which they handed out for free to comic book fans.

== Art exhibition ==
Beginning on July 31, 2012, White Box, an art gallery in New York City, launched a week-long exhibition of all the original artwork for The Art of War—over 230 pieces. The event was sponsored by Societe Perrier. Women's Wear Daily reported on vandalism that occurred at White Box on the night of the opening. White Box Artistic Director Juan Puntes told WWD that he had not seen similar violence after an opening since the 1970s and attributed it to the politically charged nature of the graphic novel and its images.

== Reception ==
Reviews of The Art of War have been mostly positive. Critics praised it for its strong characters, visual intensity and experimentation, and social commentary on the modern financial industry and China-US relations, while others criticized it for being too dark and violent. Prominent reviewers drew comparisons to Philip K. Dick, William Gibson and Jean-Luc Godard.

The San Francisco Chronicle described the book as "a melodrama of chiaroscuro, with red surging onto Michael DeWeese's virtuosic twist on the heavy metal palette when blood is shed ... the novel has the feel of a ballet or an opera."

The Austin Chronicle urged readers to "imagine the sort of thing William Gibson, on steroids, might write if he'd been bitten by a radioactive E. O. Wilson".

Kirkus Reviews called it "an epic dystopian story of brotherly love and corporate greed".

Comic Book Resources wrote "The Art of War is strongly recommended."
