= Diplomacy (2005 video game) =

2005 video game

- Developer: Paradox Development Studio
- Publishers: WW: Paradox Interactive; SWE: PAN Vision
- Platform: Microsoft Windows
- Release: NA: October 4, 2005; EU: December 9, 2005
- Genre: Turn-based strategy
- Modes: Single-player, multiplayer

Diplomacy is a turn-based strategy video game based on Avalon Hill's board game of the same name, developed by Paradox Development Studio and published by Paradox Interactive for Microsoft Windows in 2005.

== Reception ==
Reception

Aggregate score
Aggregator	Score
Metacritic	58/100

Review scores
Publication	Score
1Up.com	D−
4Players	64%
Computer Games Magazine	2/5 stars
Computer Gaming World	1/5 stars
Eurogamer	4/10
Gamekult	3/10
GameSpot	5.1/10
GameSpy	0.5/5 stars
GameZone	8.5/10
IGN	5/10
Jeuxvideo.com	12/20
PC Gamer (US)	80%

The game received "mixed" reviews according to the review aggregation website Metacritic.
