= MJM Australia =

Australian importer of physical games

- Founder: Maurice and Viviane Levy
- Headquarters: Cheltenham, Victoria, Australia

MJM Australia is an Australian importer and wholesaler of games, jigsaws, playing cards, wooden toys, board games, traditional games and puzzles. It was originally a publisher of original games and Australian editions of overseas wargames.
