= Majora (toy company) =

Portuguese toy company

Majora (Majora - Mário J. Oliveira & Irmão, Lda) is a Portuguese toy manufacturer based in Porto. It has its own museum, with toys more than 70 years old.

== History ==
Majora was founded in 1939 by Mário J. Oliveira. In 1967 today's factory in Porto was built. In that same year, mass production by Majora started improving and increasing in quantity.

The company produced various types of toys, in particular board games.

The former Majora company went bankrupt in early 2013, when the factory closed and the brands and museum were sold to Montepio. In January 2014, it was refounded by The Edge Group for €600,000. In November 2022, Concentra acquired Majora from The Edge Group, for the sum of €800,000.

== Products ==
Majora makes over 300 types of toys today and more than 1 million toys per year. It exports to various countries in Europe.

== See also ==
- List of companies of Portugal
