= Games Research Inc =

Board game publisher from Boston, United States

Game Research Inc
- Company type: Private
- Industry: Board games
- Founded: 1959
- Fate: Acquired by Avalon Hill
- Headquarters: Boston, Massachusetts, United States

Games Research, Inc., was an American board game publisher in the 1960s and 1970s based in Boston. Among the games it published are Convention! (1960), Diplomacy (1961 and again in 1971 with a revised rulebook), What's That on My Head? (1963), and Insight (1967).

After Allan B. Calhamer had unsuccessfully tried to get board game companies to publish Diplomacy, Calhamer used his own funds to make 500 copies of it in 1959 to sell. Games Research purchased the rights to Diplomacy in 1960. Games Research was acquired by Avalon Hill.

== History ==
Games Research was a Boston-based company founded as a partnership in 1959. Articles published in 1963 and 1970 said John R. Moot was the company's president. The company's five partners were Moot, who had two Harvard University graduate degrees and was the CEO of the manufacturing company Cornwall Corp.; John T. Noonan Jr., who edited the National Law Forum and was an instructor at Notre Dame University; John Mansfield, a Harvard Law School professor; Hartley Rogers Jr., an MIT math professor; and Nathaniel Young Jr., a Boston lawyer. Each man had another full-time job. Four of them were Harvard alumni while one was a Yale alumnus. Games Research accepted game applications from inventors and Moot was responsible for reviewing them; when he considered a game to be a potential success, he made phone calls to his partners to try out the game together.

The New York Times said in 1963 that Games Research "markets and sells games of a somewhat intellectual cast", while Time called it an "uncompromisingly eggheaded game-maker" that same year. Popular Science said in 1965 that Games Research was a games company that "turns out challenging diversions". Games Research was acquired by Avalon Hill.

== Games ==
Games Research released Convention, its first game, in 1960. Created by Homer D. Babbidge Jr., the Undersecretary of Health, Education, and Welfare in President Dwight D. Eisenhower's administration, Convention was set in a political convention and tasked players with the goal of securing more than 50% of the delegates to become President of the United States. Between two and seven players can compete in Convention.

Diplomacy is a board game created by Allan B. Calhamer in 1954. Calhamer had sought unsuccessfully to have multiple board game publishers including Parker Brothers accept Diplomacy, after which he used his own money to create 500 copies of the game in 1959. He mailed copies of Diplomacy to customers, charging $6.95 for each one. Between three and seven people play the game. The game is set in Europe in 1914 with players acting as different countries' delegates who attempt to take over Europe. Games Research licensed Diplomacy in 1960 and released it in 1961. Diplomacy initially did not sell many copies. John Boardman, who enjoyed playing the game, found it challenging to find other people to play the game with. To remedy this, he made a science-fiction fanzine ad asking for people to play the game by mail with him. He played a Diplomacy game by mail in August 1963 in the inaugural Diplomacy fanzine Graustark. Four years later, 32 zines were organizing Diplomacy games by mail, which led to Games Research's beginning to advertise postal Diplomacy Games. The company inserted the zine editors' names and addresses with its copies of Diplomacy. Diplomacy had "steadily mounting" sales in 1972. In 1973, owing to its reputation as "a classic in the adult game field", Diplomacy had annual sales of 15,000 with a cost of $8.95 per game even though Games Research did not spend money to advertise it. Diplomacy was believed to be Henry Kissinger's favorite game and included John F. Kennedy and Walter Cronkite among its enthusiast players.

In December 1963, the company released What's That on My Head?, a game played by at most six people. Every player puts on a "crownlike card holder" as a headpiece. A competing player places three cards into the card holder. The cards each bear a different single letter and are unknown to the person donning the card holder. Players ask each other questions from a set of cards containing questions. Three example questions are: "Is there any letter that is more plentiful than any other? If so, on how many heads does it appear?", "What is the greatest number of cards you see of the same letter?", and "How many letters have two and only two cards showing?" A player wins when they are able to correctly guess all of the letters of the cards on their head. Games Research created a variant of What's That on My Head? where the number of cards placed on a person's head is not restricted to three. Players are required to also say how many cards they have.

The company released a game called Insight in 1967 in which players assess the personalities of themselves and the other players by choosing among the different card options. Four example cards are: "Which one of these scenes appeals to your romantic nature?", "Spend $25,000 on yourself in one of these luxury areas", "You are snowbound in a mountain cabin. To pass the time, make one selection from the following list of reading materials", and "Could you find inner peace in one of these 12 settings?" The Gazette's Jane Martin wrote, "The game guarantees to stimulate conversation and perhaps a little friendly discord as players compare insights."
