= The Art of War =

5th-century BC Chinese military treatise

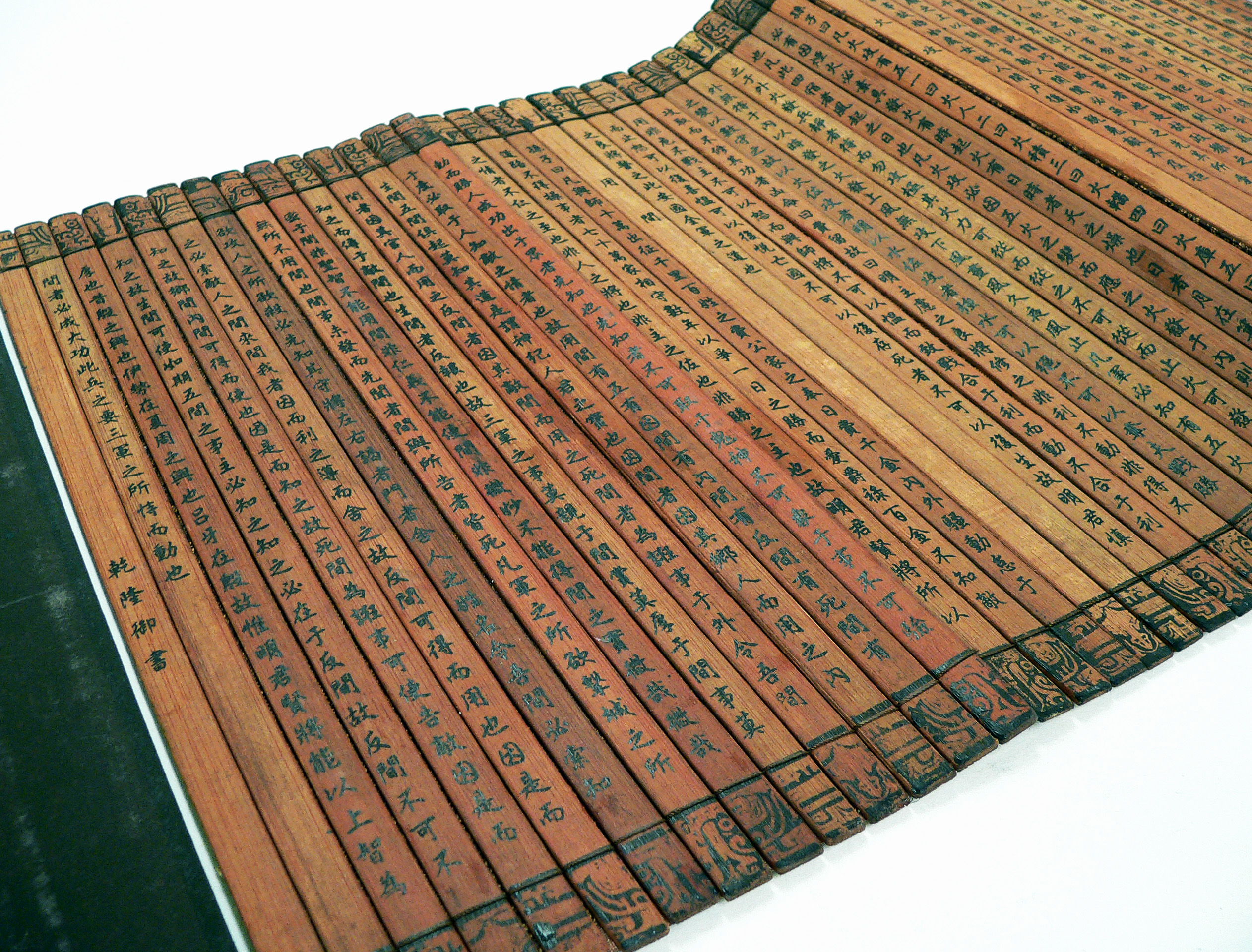
- Author: Sun Tzu (traditional)
- Language: Classical Chinese
- Subject: Military art
- Publication date: 5th century BC
- Publication place: China
- Dewey Decimal: 355.02
- LC Class: U101 .S95
- Original text: The Art of War at Chinese Wikisource
- Translation: The Art of War at Wikisource

Chinese name
- Traditional Chinese: 孫子兵法
- Simplified Chinese: 孙子兵法
- Literal meaning: "Master Sun's Military Methods"
Transcriptions
Standard Mandarin
- Hanyu Pinyin: Sūnzǐ bīngfǎ
- Bopomofo: ㄙㄨㄣ ㄗˇ ㄅㄧㄥ ㄈㄚˇ
- Wade–Giles: Sun^{1}-tzu^{3} ping^{1}-fa^{3}
- IPA: [swə́ntsɹ̩̀ píŋfà]
Yue: Cantonese
- Yale Romanization: Syūnjí bīngfaat
- Jyutping: Syun1 zi2 bing1 faat3
- IPA: [syn˥tsi˧˥ pɪŋ˥fat̚˧]
Southern Min
- Tâi-lô: Sun-tzú ping-huat
Old Chinese
- Baxter–Sagart (2014): *sˤun tsəʔ praŋ p.kap

The Art of War is an ancient Chinese military treatise dating from the late Spring and Autumn period (roughly 5th century BC). The work, which is attributed to the ancient Chinese military strategist Sun Tzu ("Master Sun"), is composed of 13 chapters. Each chapter is devoted to a different set of skills or arts related to warfare, finance and how they apply to military strategy and tactics. For almost 1,500 years, it was the lead text in an anthology that was formalized as the Seven Military Classics by Emperor Shenzong of Song in 1080. The Art of War remains one of the most influential works on strategy of all time and has shaped both East Asian and Western military theory and thinking.

The treatise comprises a detailed explanation and analysis of the 5th-century BC Chinese military, from weapons, environmental conditions, financial logistics and strategy to morale, rank and discipline. Sun portrays war as a costly, destructive last resort; prolonged warfare erodes the state faster than the enemy ever could. Sun uses diplomacy and economic principles in explaining how to keep war brief, contained, controlled, and as cheap as possible by minimizing financial exposure. Sun also stresses the importance of intelligence operatives and espionage to both the war effort and the prevention of war. Considered one of history's finest military tacticians and analysts, his teachings and strategies formed the basis of advanced military training throughout the world.

The text was first translated into a European language in 1772, when the French Jesuit priest Jean Joseph Marie Amiot produced a French version. The first annotated English translation was published in 1910 by the British scholar Lionel Giles. Military and political leaders such as the Chinese communist revolutionary Mao Zedong, Japanese daimyō Takeda Shingen, Vietnamese general Võ Nguyên Giáp, and American generals Douglas MacArthur and Norman Schwarzkopf Jr. are all cited as having drawn inspiration from the book.

== History ==
=== Text and commentaries ===
The Art of War is traditionally attributed to an ancient Chinese military general known as Sun Tzu (pinyin: Sūnzǐ), meaning 'Master Sun'. Sun Tzu is said to have lived in the 6th century BC, but the earliest parts of The Art of War probably date to at least 100 years later.

Sima Qian's Shiji, the first of China's Twenty-Four Histories, records an early Chinese tradition that a text on military matters was written by one Sun Wu (孫武) from the state of Qi, and that this text had been read and studied by King Helü of Wu (r. 514–495 BC). This text was traditionally identified with the received Master Sun's Art of War. The conventional view was that Sun Wu was a military theorist from the end of the Spring and Autumn period (776–471 BC) who fled Qi to the southeastern state of Wu, where he is said to have impressed the king with his ability to quickly train officials, including court women, in military discipline—and to have made Wu's armies powerful enough to challenge the rival state of Chu to Wu's west. This view is still widely held in China.

The strategist and warlord Kai Wen in the early 3rd century AD authored the earliest known commentary on the Art of War. Kai's preface makes clear that he edited the text and removed certain passages, but the extent of his changes were unclear historically. The Art of War appears throughout the bibliographical catalogs of the Chinese dynastic histories, but listings of its divisions and size varied widely.

=== Authorship ===
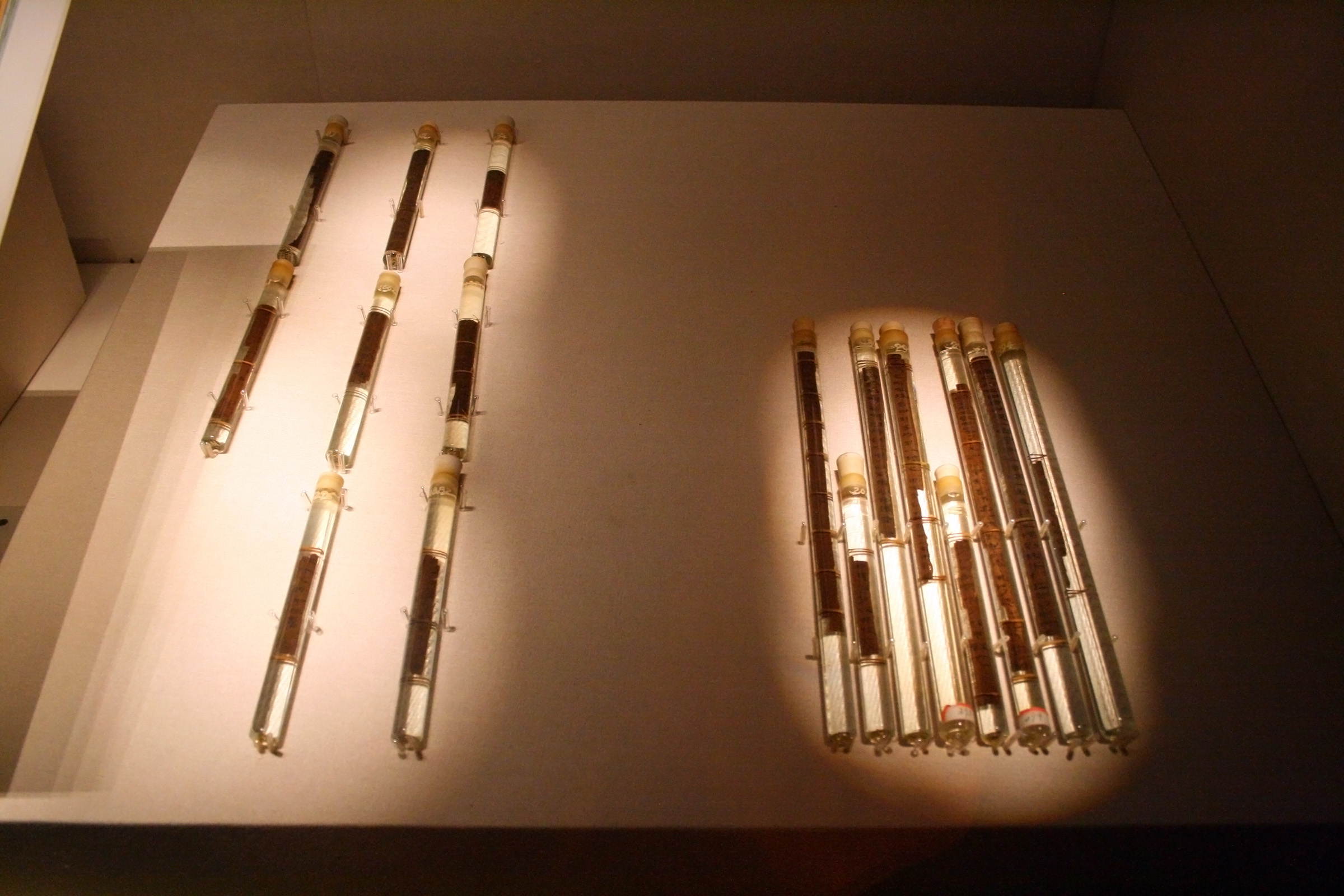
Fragments of The Art of War discovered as a part of the Yinqueshan Han Slips, showing the version of The Art of War that was popular in Han dynasty (206 BC – 220 AD)

Beginning around the 12th century, Chinese scholars began to question Sun Tzu's historical existence. Their primary ground was that the historical classic Zuo Zhuan, which mentions most of the notable figures from the Spring and Autumn period, does not mention Sun Tzu at all. The name "Sun Wu" (孫武) does not appear in any text prior to the Records of the Grand Historian. Some scholars have suspected it is a made-up descriptive cognomen meaning "the fugitive warrior", glossing the surname "Sun" as the related term "fugitive" (xùn 遜), while "Wu" (wǔ 武) is (1) the ancient Chinese virtue of "martial, valiant" and (2) a Jianghuai dialectal synonym of 士; shì "knight", which corresponds to Sunzi's role as the hero's doppelgänger in the story of Wu Zixu. In the early 20th century, the Chinese writer and reformer Liang Qichao theorized that the text was actually written in the 4th century BC by Sun Tzu's purported descendant Sun Bin, as several historical sources mention a military treatise he wrote. It is possible, according to Samuel B. Griffith that Sun Wu may not have written The Art of War.

In 1972, the Yinqueshan Han slips were discovered in two Han dynasty (206 BC – 220 AD) tombs near the city of Linyi in Shandong. Among the many bamboo slip writings contained in the tombs, which had been sealed between 134 and 118 BC, were two separate texts: one attributed to "Sun Tzu", corresponding to the received text, and another attributed to Sun Bin, which explains and expands upon the earlier The Art of War by Sunzi. The Sun Bin text's material overlaps with much of the "Sun Tzu" text. The two may be "a single, continuously developing intellectual tradition united under the Sun name". This discovery showed that much of the historical confusion was due to the fact that there were two texts that could have been referred to as "Master Sun's Art of War", not one. The content of the earlier text is about one-third of the chapters of the modern The Art of War, and their text matches very closely. It is now generally accepted that the earlier The Art of War was completed sometime between 500 and 430 BC.

== Chapters ==
The Art of War is divided into thirteen chapters (or piān); the collection is referred to as being one zhuàn ("whole" or alternatively "chronicle").

The Art of War chapter names and contents
Chapter	Lionel Giles (1910)	R. L. Wing (1988)	Ralph D. Sawyer (1996)	Chow-Hou Wee (2003)	Michael Nylan (2020)
Contents
I	Laying Plans	The Calculations	Initial Estimations	Detail Assessment and Planning (Chinese: 始計; pinyin: shǐjì)	First Calculations
Explores the five fundamental factors (the Way, seasons, terrain, leadership, and management) and seven elements (which of the two sovereigns is imbued with the way or moral law, which side's general is more capable, which side's laws and regulations can be enforced more strictly, which side has more resources, better equipment and stronger army, which side's officers and men are more well-trained and more capable of fighting, which side's rewards and punishments are more fair and clear) that determine the outcomes of military engagements. By thinking, assessing and comparing these points, a commander can calculate his chances of victory. Habitual deviation from these calculations will ensure failure via improper action. The text stresses that war is a very grave matter for the state and must not be commenced without due consideration.
II	Waging War	The Challenge	Waging War	Waging War (作戰; zuòzhàn)	Initiating Battle
Explains how to understand the economy of warfare and how success requires winning decisive engagements quickly. This section advises that successful military campaigns require limiting the cost of competition and conflict.
III	Attack by Stratagem	The Plan of Attack	Planning Offensives	Strategic Attack (謀攻; móugōng)	Planning an Attack
Defines the source of strength as unity, not size, and discusses the five factors that are needed to succeed in any war. In order of importance, these critical factors are: Attack, Strategy, Alliances, Army and Cities.
IV	Tactical Dispositions	Positioning	Military Disposition	Disposition of the Army (軍形; jūnxíng)	Forms to Perceive
Explains the importance of defending existing positions until a commander is capable of advancing from those positions in safety. It teaches commanders the importance of recognizing strategic opportunities, and teaches not to create opportunities for the enemy.
V	Use of Energy	Directing	Strategic Military Power	Forces (兵勢; bīngshì)	The Disposition of Power
Explains the use of creativity and timing in building an army's momentum.
VI	Weak Points and Strong	Illusion and Reality	Vacuity and Substance	Weaknesses and Strengths (虛實; xūshí)	Weak and Strong
Explains how an army's opportunities come from the openings in the environment caused by the relative weakness of the enemy and how to respond to changes in the fluid battlefield over a given area.
VII	Maneuvering an Army	Engaging The Force	Military Combat	Military Maneuvers (軍爭; jūnzhēng)	Contending Armies
Explains the dangers of direct conflict and how to win those confrontations when they are forced upon the commander.
VIII	Variation of Tactics	The Nine Variations	Nine Changes	Variations and Adaptability (九變; jiǔbiàn)	Nine Contingencies
Focuses on the need for flexibility in an army's responses. It explains how to respond to shifting circumstances successfully.
IX	The Army on the March	Moving The Force	Maneuvering the Army	Movement and Development of Troops (行軍; xíngjūn)	Fielding the Army
Describes the different situations in which an army finds itself as it moves through new enemy territories, and how to respond to these situations. Much of this section focuses on evaluating the intentions of others.
X	Classification of Terrain	Situational Positioning	Configurations of Terrain	Terrain (地形; dìxíng)	Conformations of the Lands
Looks at the three general areas of resistance (distance, dangers and barriers) and the six types of ground positions that arise from them. Each of these six field positions offers certain advantages and disadvantages.
XI	The Nine Situations	The Nine Situations	Nine Terrains	The Nine Battlegrounds (九地; jiǔde)	Nine Kinds of Ground
Describes the nine common situations (or stages) in a campaign, from scattering to deadly, and the specific focus that a commander will need in order to successfully navigate them.
XII	Attack by Fire	The Fiery Attack	Incendiary Attacks	Attacking with Fire (火攻; huǒgōng)	Attacks with Fire
Explains the general use of weapons and the specific use of the environment as a weapon. This section examines the five targets for attack, the five types of environmental attack and the appropriate responses to such attacks.
XIII	Use of Spies	The Use of Intelligence	Employing Spies	Intelligence and Espionage (用間; yòngjiān)	Using Spies
Focuses on the importance of developing good information sources, and specifies the five types of intelligence sources and how to best manage each of them.

== Cultural influence ==
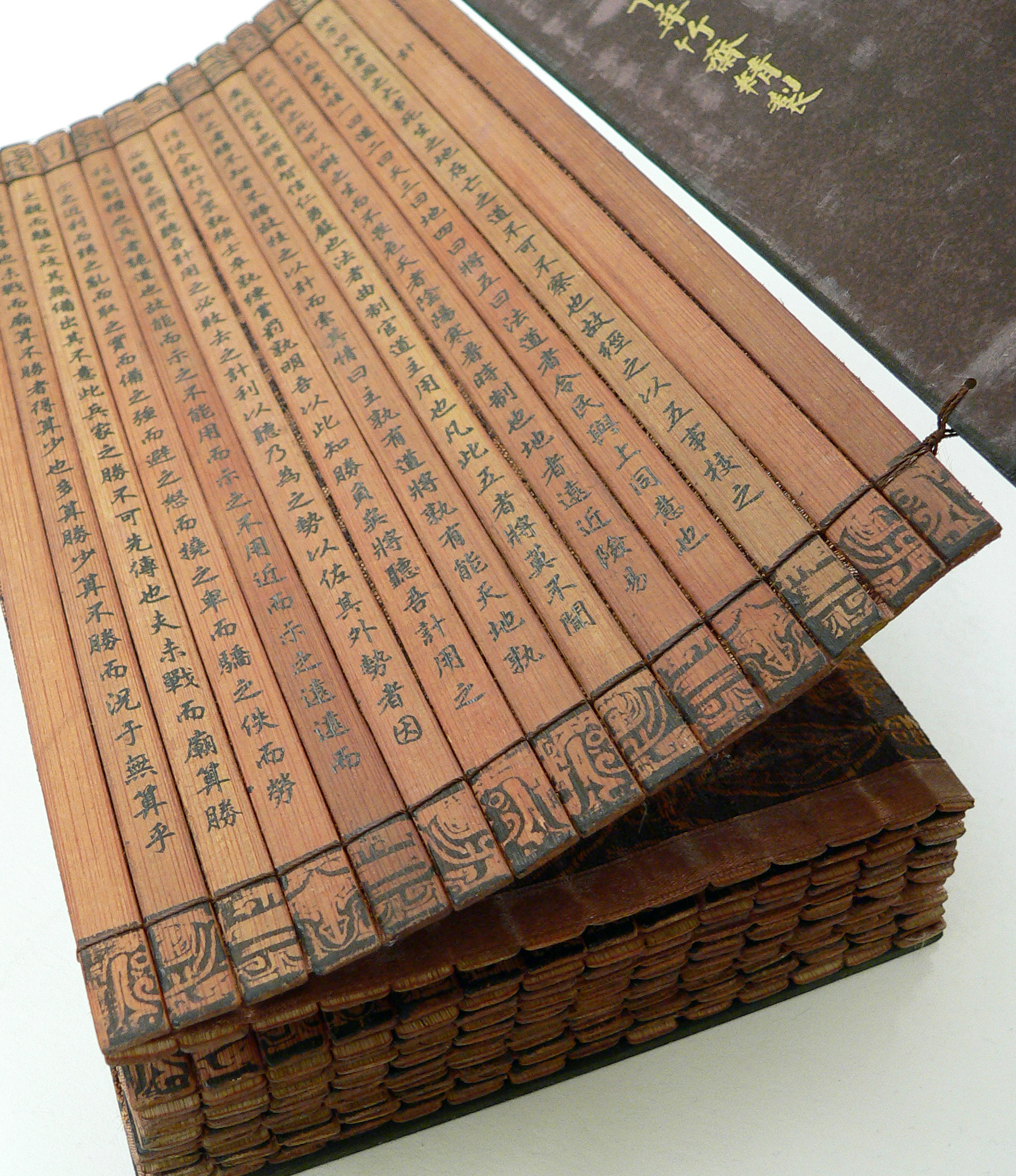
The beginning of The Art of War in a classical bamboo book from the reign of the Qianlong Emperor

=== Military and intelligence applications ===
Across East Asia, The Art of War was part of the syllabus for potential candidates of military service examinations.

During the Sengoku period (c. 1467–1568), the Japanese daimyō Takeda Shingen (1521–1573) is said to have become almost invincible in all battles without relying on guns, because he studied The Art of War. The book even gave him the inspiration for his famous battle standard "Fūrinkazan" (Wind, Forest, Fire and Mountain), meaning fast as the wind, silent as a forest, ferocious as fire and immovable as a mountain.

The translator Samuel B. Griffith offers a chapter on "Sun Tzu and Mao Tse-Tung" where The Art of War is cited as influencing Mao's On Guerrilla Warfare, On the Protracted War and Strategic Problems of China's Revolutionary War, and includes Mao's quote: "We must not belittle the saying in the book of Sun Wu Tzu, the great military expert of ancient China, 'Know your enemy and know yourself and you can fight a hundred battles without disaster.'" Mao may have been inspired to write this after the Fifth encirclement campaign against the Jiangxi Soviet, where for the first time, the Soviets knew neither the enemy nor themselves, and were in peril in every battle.

During the Vietnam War, some Viet Cong officers extensively studied The Art of War and reportedly could recite entire passages from memory. General Võ Nguyên Giáp successfully implemented tactics described in The Art of War during the Battle of Dien Bien Phu ending major French involvement in Indochina and leading to the accords which partitioned Vietnam into North and South. General Giáp, later the main PVA military commander in the Vietnam War, was an avid student and practitioner of Sun Tzu's ideas.

==== Outside East Asia ====
The United States' defeat in the Vietnam War, more than any other event, brought Sun Tzu to the attention of leaders of U.S. military theory. The Department of the Army in the United States, through its Command and General Staff College, lists The Art of War as one example of a book that may be kept at a military unit's library. The Art of War is listed on the US Marine Corps Professional Reading Program (formerly known as the Commandant's Reading List). It is recommended reading for all United States Military Intelligence personnel. The Art of War is also used as instructional material at the United States Military Academy (commonly known as West Point), in the course Military Strategy (470). It is also recommended reading for Officer cadets at the Royal Military Academy, Sandhurst. Some notable military leaders have stated the following about Sun Tzu and The Art of War:

I always kept a copy of The Art of War on my desk. – General Douglas MacArthur, 5 Star General and Supreme Commander for the Allied Powers.

I have read The Art of War by Sun Tzu. He continues to influence both soldiers & politicians. – General Colin Powell, Chairman of the Joint Chiefs of Staff, National Security Advisor, and Secretary of State.

According to some authors, the strategy of deception from The Art of War was studied and widely used by the KGB: "I will force the enemy to take our strength for weakness, and our weakness for strength, and thus will turn his strength into weakness".

=== Application outside the military ===
Some of the book's admirers claim that it has a variety of applications in a myriad of competitive non-military endeavors across the modern world including espionage, culture, politics, business, and sports.

Some business books have claimed to see metaphorical parallels from The Art of War to office politics and corporate business strategy. Some Japanese companies make the book required reading for their key executives. Entrepreneurs and corporate executives have turned to it for inspiration and advice on how to succeed in competitive business situations. The book has also been applied to the field of education.

The Art of War has been the subject of legal books and legal articles on the trial process, including negotiation tactics and trial strategy.

The book The 48 Laws of Power by Robert Greene has many quotations from The Art of War.

The Art of War has also been applied in sports. National Football League coach Bill Belichick, record holder of the most Super Bowl wins in history, has stated on multiple occasions his admiration for The Art of War. Brazilian association football coach Luiz Felipe Scolari actively used The Art of War for Brazil's successful 2002 World Cup campaign. During the tournament Scolari put passages of The Art of War underneath his players' doors at night.

Playing To Win by David Sirlin analyses applications of the ideas from The Art of War in modern esports. The Art of War was released in 2014 as an e-book companion alongside the Art of War DLC for Europa Universalis IV, a PC strategy game by Paradox Development Studios, with a foreword by Thomas Johansson.

=== Film and television ===
The Art of War and Sun Tzu have been referenced and quoted in many movies and television shows, including in the 1987 movie Wall Street, in which Gordon Gekko (Michael Douglas) frequently references it, and commends his protege, Bud Fox, for being able to quote a relevant passage from memory. The 20th James Bond film, Die Another Day (2002) also references The Art of War as the spiritual guide shared by Colonel Moon and his father. In The Sopranos, season 3, episode 8 ("He Is Risen"), Dr. Melfi suggests to Tony Soprano that he read the book.

In the Star Trek: The Next Generation first-season episode "The Last Outpost", first officer William Riker quotes The Art of War: "Fear is the true enemy, the only enemy". Captain Picard expressed pleasure that Sun Tzu was still taught at Starfleet Academy. Later in the episode, a survivor from a long-dead nonhuman empire noted common aspects between his own people's wisdom and The Art of War with regard to knowing when and when not to fight.

The Art of War is a 2000 action spy film directed by Christian Duguay and starring Wesley Snipes, Michael Biehn, Anne Archer and Donald Sutherland.

== Notable translations ==
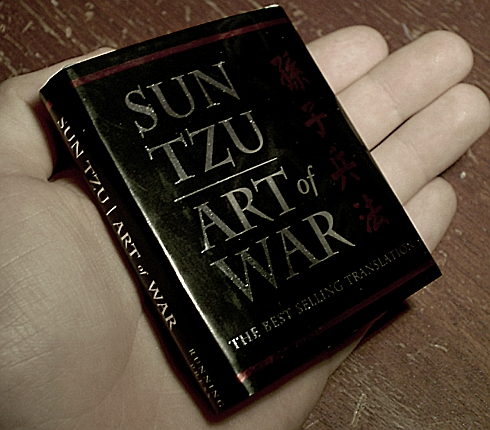
Running Press miniature edition of the 1994 Ralph D. Sawyer translation, printed in 2003

- Sun Tzu on the Art of War. Translated by Lionel Giles. London: Luzac and Company. 1910.
- The Art of War. Translated by Samuel B. Griffith. Oxford: Oxford University Press. 1963. ISBN 978-0-19-501476-1. Part of the UNESCO Collection of Representative Works.
- Sun Tzu, The Art of War. Translated by Thomas Cleary. Boston: Shambhala Dragon Editions. 1988. ISBN 978-0877734529.
- The Art of Warfare. Translated by Roger Ames. Random House. 1993. ISBN 978-0-345-36239-1.
- The Art of War. Translated by John Minford. New York: Viking. 2002. ISBN 978-0-670-03156-6.
- The Art of War: Sunzi's Military Methods. Translated by Victor H. Mair. New York: Columbia University Press. 2007. ISBN 978-0-231-13382-1.
- The art of war / Sun Tzu ; a new translation by Michael Nylan. Translated by Michael Nylan. New York: W. W. Norton & Company, Inc. 2020. ISBN 978-1-324-00489-9.

== See also ==
=== Books ===
- Arthashastra
- On War by Carl von Clausewitz
- The Art of War by Niccolò Machiavelli
- The Book of Five Rings (Miyamoto Musashi)
- The Art of War (comic book) by Kelly Roman

=== Concepts ===
- Military treatise
- Philosophy of war
