= Buffalo Games =

Board game publishing company

Buffalo Games, Inc.
- Type: Private
- Industry: Toys and games
- Founded: 1986
- Founder: Paul A. Dedrick; Eden Scott Dedrick
- Headquarters: Buffalo, New York, USA
- Products: Jigsaw puzzles, board games, children's games
- Revenue: unknown
- Operating income: unknown
- Net income: unknown
- Number of employees: 50–100
- Website: buffalogames.com

Buffalo Games is an American company that specializes in board games and puzzles, headquartered in Buffalo, New York. Founded in 1986, Buffalo Games continues to develop its products, with most manufacturing taking place in the United States. Buffalo's product line has often included popular artists and licenses such as Disney, Pixar, Star Wars, Peanuts, The Muppets, Looney Tunes, The Simpsons, NFL, Coca-Cola, Harley-Davidson, NASCAR, M. C. Escher, Vincent van Gogh, and Norman Rockwell.

== History ==
Buffalo Games was founded in 1986 as a family-run business. The initial product line consisted of several board games, and one puzzle, referred to as The World's Most Difficult Puzzle. The initial revenue from their product line came from their sales and marketing to bulk mail catalogs and department store gift sections. The company began mass manufacturing of games and puzzles in 1996.

On September 19, 2018, Mason Wells, a Midwest-based private equity firm, along with Nagendra Raina, Chief Executive Officer of Buffalo Games, and other members of the management team, acquired the business from the founders, Paul and Eden Dedrick. Financial terms of the transaction were not disclosed.

== Products ==
Buffalo Games designs and produces puzzles and puzzle accessories, as well as party-style board games. Its jigsaw puzzle line has included licensed artwork and images, including Pokémon, Disney, Pixar, Star Wars, National Geographic, Avatar, Cocomelon, Marvel and Charles Wysocki.
