= Diplomacy (game) =

Strategic board game

- Designers: Allan B. Calhamer
- Publishers: Wizards of the Coast
- Publication: 1959; 67 years ago
- Genres: Strategy game; Board game; Wargame
- Players: 2–7
- Setup time: 5–10 minutes
- Playing time: 4–12 hours
- Chance: None
- Skills: Tactics; Strategy; Psychology; Negotiation

Diplomacy is a strategic board game created by Allan B. Calhamer in 1954 and released commercially in the United States in 1959. Its main distinctions from most board wargames are its negotiation phases (players spend much of their time forming and betraying alliances with other players and forming beneficial strategies) and the absence of dice and other game elements that produce random effects. Set in Europe in the years leading to the First World War, Diplomacy is designed to be played by seven players, but can be played with as few as two, each controlling the armed forces of a major European power (or, with fewer players, multiple powers). Each player aims to move their few starting units and defeat those of others to win possession of a majority of strategic cities and provinces marked as "supply centers" on the map; these supply centers allow players who control them to produce more units. Following each round of player negotiations, each player can issue attack and support orders, which are then executed during the movement phase. A player takes control of a province when the number of provinces that are given orders to support the attacking province exceeds the number of provinces given orders to support the defending province.

Diplomacy was the first commercially published game to be played by mail (PBM); only chess, which is in the public domain, saw significant postal play earlier. Diplomacy was also the first commercially published game to generate an active hobby scene with amateur fanzines; only science-fiction, fantasy and comics fandom saw fanzines earlier. Competitive face-to-face Diplomacy tournaments have been held since the 1970s. Play of Diplomacy by e-mail (PBEM) has been widespread since the late 1980s.

Diplomacy has been published in the United States by Games Research, Avalon Hill, and Hasbro; the name is currently a registered trademark of Hasbro's Avalon Hill division. Diplomacy has also been licensed to various companies for publication in other countries. Diplomacy is also played on the Internet, adjudicated by a computer or a human gamemaster.

== History ==
The idea for Diplomacy arose from Allan B. Calhamer's study at Harvard of nineteenth-century European history under Sidney B. Fay and from his study of political geography. Calhamer also drew inspiration from the card game of Hearts, in which he observed that players were at an advantage when they teamed up against the leader, and from the game of chess, which inspired him to use a limited number of spaces and pieces.

The rough form of Diplomacy was created in 1954, and its details were developed through playtesting until the 1958 map and rules revisions. Calhamer paid for a 500-game print run of that version in 1959 after rejection by major companies. It has been published since then by Games Research (in 1961, then a 1971 edition with a revised rulebook), Avalon Hill (in 1976), by Hasbro's Avalon Hill division (in 1999), and now by Wizards of the Coast (in 2008) in the US, and licensed to other boardgame publishers for versions sold in other countries. Among these are Parker Brothers, Waddingtons Games, Gibsons Games, and Asmodée Editions.

The first copy of the first print run was sold by the Calhamer estate through auction in 2017.

== Basic setting and overview ==
The board is a map of 1901 Europe plus Turkey, Syria and North Africa. It is divided into fifty-six land regions and nineteen sea regions. Forty-two of the land regions are divided among the seven Great Powers of the game: Austria-Hungary, Great Britain, France, Germany, Italy, Russia, and Turkey. The remaining fourteen land regions are neutral at the start of the game.

Thirty-four of the land regions contain "supply centers", corresponding to major centers of government, industry or commerce (e.g., Vienna and Rome); twenty-two of these are located within the Great Powers and are referred to as "home" supply centers. The remaining twelve are located in the neutral provinces. The number of supply centers a player controls determines the total number of armies and fleets a player may have on the board, and as players gain and lose control of centers, they may build (raise) or must remove (disband) units correspondingly.

A Diplomacy board, showing the different land and sea territories, starting borders and the location of supply centers

The land provinces within the Great Powers which contain supply centers are generally named after a major city in the province (e.g. London and Moscow) while the other land provinces within the Great Powers are generally named after a region (e.g. Bohemia and Apulia). Neutral land provinces are generally named after countries (e.g. Serbia and Belgium).

All players other than Britain and Russia begin the game with two armies and one fleet; Britain starts with two fleets and one army, and Russia starts with two armies and two fleets, making it the only player to start the game with more than three units. Only one unit at a time may occupy a given map region. Balancing units to supply center counts is done after each game-year, which involves two seasons of play: Spring and Fall.

At the beginning of the game, the twelve neutral supply centers are typically captured within the first few moves. Further acquisition of supply centers becomes a zero sum dynamic with any gains in a player's resources coming at the expense of a rival.

== Historical accuracy ==
Although the game starts in 1901, the map generally reflects the political boundaries of Europe in 1914, just before the outbreak of the Great War. Bosnia is already annexed to the Austro-Hungarian Empire, and the Balkans reflect the results of the wars of 1912 and 1913 in the region.

On the other hand, Montenegro is shown as part of Austria-Hungary. Additionally, North Africa and Tunis start the game as neutral, despite these regions being part of the French colonial empire in 1914. Finland and Syria are both parts of Great Powers, as Finland was part of the Russian Empire, and Syria was part of the Ottoman Empire in 1914. Tunis is used rather than Tunisia on most boards. North Africa is a single province covering parts of Algeria and Morocco.

== Comparison with other war games ==
Diplomacy differs from the majority of war games because:

- Players do not take turns sequentially; instead all players secretly write down their moves after a negotiation period, then all moves are revealed and put into effect simultaneously.
- Social interaction and interpersonal skills make up an essential part of the play.
- The rules that simulate combat are strategic, abstract, and simple—not tactical, realistic, or complex—as this is a diplomatic simulation game, not a military one.
- Combat resolution contains no random elements –no dice are rolled or cards drawn.
- Each military unit has the same strength.
- It is especially well suited to postal play, which led to an active hobby of amateur publishing.
- Internet Diplomacy is one of the few early board games that is still played on the web.
- The game board is on the scale of an entire continent, rather than a single campaign theater.
- Land and sea power are almost equally significant, and a player's decision as to whether to raise an army or a fleet is highly significant.

== Gameplay ==
Diplomacy proceeds by seasons, beginning in the year 1901, with each year divided into two main seasons: the "Spring" and "Fall" (Autumn) moves. Each season is further divided into negotiation and movement phases, followed by "retreat" or "disband" adjustments and an end-of-the-year Winter phase of new builds or removals following the Fall adjustments.

=== Negotiation phase ===
In the negotiation phase, players discuss tactics and strategy, form alliances, and share intelligence or spread disinformation. Negotiations may be made public or kept private. Players are not bound to anything they say or promise, and no agreements are enforceable.

Communication and trust are core mechanics of the game; players must forge alliances with others and observe their actions to evaluate their trustworthiness. At the same time, they must convince others of their own trustworthiness while making plans to turn against their allies.

=== Movement phase ===
After the negotiation period, players write secret orders for each unit; these orders are revealed and executed simultaneously. A unit can move from its location to an adjacent space, support an adjacent unit to hold an area in the event of an attack, support another unit to attack a space into which it could move itself, or hold defensively. In addition, fleets may transport armies from one coast space to another when in a chain called a "convoy". Armies may only occupy land regions, and fleets occupy sea regions and the land regions that border named seas. Only one unit may occupy each region. If multiple units are ordered to move to the same region, only the unit with the most support moves there. If two or more units have the same highest support, a standoff occurs and no units ordered to that region move. A unit ordered to give support that is attacked has those orders canceled and is forced to hold, except in the case that support is being given to a unit invading the region from which the attack originated (in which case the unit that had been ordered to give support must retreat from, rather than hold, its position).

Certain spaces on the board have two coasts and here a player must specify which one they want their fleet to occupy. A fleet can only move to coasts and oceans that border the coast that it is on. For example, a fleet occupying the southern coast of Bulgaria cannot move into Romania or the Black Sea, but a fleet on the east coast could.

=== End-of-year and supply centers ===
After each Fall move, newly acquired supply centers become owned by the occupying player, and each power's supply center total is recalculated; players with fewer supply centers than units on the board must disband units, while players with more supply centers than units on the board are entitled to build units in their open (unoccupied) Home centers (supply centers controlled at the start of the game). Players who have lost all of their Home centers may not build new units, while players controlling no supply centers are eliminated from the game. If a player controls 18 or more (being more than half) of the 34 supply centers at the end of a year, they are the winner. Players who remain may also agree to a draw – around half of all games will end in a draw.

== Variants ==
Several boardgames based on Diplomacy have been commercially published. Additionally, many fans of the game have created hundreds of variants of their own, using altered rules on the standard map, standard rules on a different map, or both.

=== Rulebook provision for fewer than seven players ===
The rules allow for games with two to six players, closing parts of the standard board, but these are used only in casual play, and are not considered standard Diplomacy in tournament, postal, or most forms of online play. For example, if there are six players, everyone plays one country and Italy is not used; for five players, Italy and Germany are not used. The original rules did not include additional guidelines, but the Avalon Hill set included suggestions, such as individual players using multiple countries, and additions.

Another approach to solving the problem of fewer than seven players is the use of the Escalation Variant Rules by Edi Birsan:

1. Players start with no pieces on the board
2. Players put one piece down on the board in any province one at a time (starting with the youngest player)
3. After reaching the maximum number of pieces the players start the game with ownership of their starting provinces.
4. At the end of Fall 1901 with their adjustments players write down their three HOME centers for the rest of the game.

This is done without negotiations and may result in two players declaring the same province. However, in order to build there they still must own it and the province must be open. Players may choose any supply center as a HOME for example: EDI, DEN, ROM

It is suggested that for the number players the following starting pieces are used:

- Two – 12 units
- Three – 8 units
- Four − 6 units
- Five – 5 units
- Six – 4 units

It is also suggested that for games with 2–4 players that the 'Gunboat' rule applies which means that there are no discussions.

For 4 or 5 players, it is suggested that the 'Wilson' or 'Public Press' rule applies which means that all discussions must take place in the open at the table with no whispers or secret signals.

For 5 or 6 players, it is suggested that regular negotiation rules apply.

The following are the current official suggestions:

==== Alternative way to play ====
The following is an alternative way to play the game of Diplomacy when fewer than seven players are present.

Six Players
Eliminate Italy. Italian units hold in position and defend themselves, but don't support each other. Units belonging to any of the players can support them in their holding position. If Italian units are forced to retreat, they're disbanded.

Five Players
Eliminate Italy and Germany (as described for Italy above).

Four Players
One player plays Britain, and the other three play the following pairs: Austria/France, Germany/Turkey, and Italy/Russia.

Three Players
One player controls Britain/Germany/Austria; the second, Russia/Italy; and the third, France/Turkey. Or one player plays Britain/Austria; one plays France/Russia; one plays Germany/Turkey. In this version Italy is not played.

Three Players (alternative)
One person plays Russia while the other two control Britain/France/Germany and Austria/Italy/Turkey.

Two Players
This version can be played as a World War I simulation. One player controls Britain/France/Russia while the other plays Austria/Germany/Turkey. Italy is neutral and Italian territory can't be entered. The game begins in 1914. Before the Fall 1914 adjustments, flip a coin. Italy joins the winner of the toss in Spring 1915. The first player to control 24 supply centers wins. This is also a way for two new players to learn the rules.

In games for two, three, or four players, supply-center ownership is computed for each individual country, even though the same person plays more than one country. As with the regular rules, adjustments must be made by each country in accordance with its supply-center holdings.

=== Commercially published Diplomacy variants ===
There have been six commercially released variants of Diplomacy — Machiavelli, Kamakura, Colonial Diplomacy, Hundred, Ard-Rí and Classical. Imperial is a boardgame with enough similarities to be described as a Diplomacy variant by some.

==== Machiavelli ====
Machiavelli was published by Battleline Publications, later taken over by Avalon Hill. Set in Renaissance Italy, the board is controlled by the Republic of Florence, the Republic of Venice, the Duchy of Milan, the Kingdom of Naples, the Papacy, Valois France, Habsburg Austria, and the Ottoman Turks. The game introduces many rules changes such as money, bribery, three seasons per year, garrisons, and random events such as plague and famine. It features scenarios tailored for as few as four and as many as eight players.

==== Kamakura ====
Kamakura was published by West End Games in the early 1980s. Its setting is feudal Japan.

==== Colonial Diplomacy ====
Published by Avalon Hill in 1994. It is set in Asia in the late 19th century, and much of the board is controlled by various colonial powers: the United Kingdom, the Russian Empire, the Empire of Japan, The Netherlands, Ottoman Empire, China, and France. The game introduces three special features:

- The Trans-Siberian railroad extends across Russia from Moscow to Vladivostok. The railroad can be used by Russia to move armies anywhere along the railroad. The TSR may only be used by Russia. Russian armies are allowed to move through other Russian armies, but foreign armies can block the passage of armies on the TSR.
- The Suez Canal is the only way to move between the Red Sea and Mediterranean Sea. Use of the Suez Canal is controlled by whoever is in control of Egypt. The use of the Suez Canal increases in importance later in the game as expansion becomes both more important and more difficult.
- The ownership of Hong Kong counts as a supply center for any country except China.

This map was used as the basis of the Imperial Asia expansion map.

Colonial Diplomacy won in a tie the Origins Award for Best Pre-20th Century Board Game of 1995.

==== Hundred ====
Hundred is a map for three players by Andy D. Schwarz based on the Hundred Years' War created in 1996 and published by Stupendous Games in 2000.

==== Ard-Rí ====
Ard-Rí is a map by Stuart John Bernard based on pre-Christian Ireland (though it anachronistically includes Vikings), created in 1998, and published by Stupendous Games in 2000. Ard-Rí happens to also be the name of a hnefatafl variant played in Ancient Ireland.

==== Classical ====
Classical is a map by Andy D. Schwarz and Vincent Mous based on the ancient world after the death of Alexander the Great, created in 1998, and published by Stupendous Games in 2000.

==== Diplomacy of the Three Kingdoms ====
Based on the Three Kingdoms in Ancient China, it was created by Edi Birsan to introduce the basic ideas of the main game to a Chinese audience with a setting more close to their own historical experience. It was published by MJS Creations in 2008.

=== Diplomacy variants not commercially published ===
A wide range of other variants of Diplomacy have been created and played without being commercially published. These include settings such as the ancient and renaissance world. Some variants use new maps and rules, while others simply vary the original game, such as the Fleet Rome variant which replaces the starting Italian army in Rome with a fleet.

==== Youngstown ====
One of the most notable non-commercially published is the Youngstown variant which is an extension of the normal map, including Asia and colonies there. For example, in addition to the usual home centers, France starts with a fleet in Saigon (in Cochinchina). Three new Powers were added – India, China, and Japan - with powers without historical Asian colonies being given more home centers. The variant was named after the city of Youngstown, Ohio where the variant was invented.

== Tournaments ==
Diplomacy is played at a number of formal tournaments in many nations. Most face-to-face Diplomacy tournaments longer than one day are associated with either a Diplomacy-centered convention (such as DipCon or Dixiecon) or a large multi-game convention (such as the Origins Game Fair, World Boardgaming Championships, or the Carnage Gaming Convention). Some conventions are centered on the games and have a highly competitive atmosphere; others have more focus on meeting and socializing with other players from the postal or e-mail parts of the hobby.

=== Tournament play ===
In some tournaments, each game ends after a specified number of game-years, to ensure that all players can play in all rounds without limiting the tournament structure to one round per day. At other events, a game continues until a winner is determined or a draw is voted. Tournaments in Europe are generally played with a specific end year whereas tournaments in North America more often are played until someone wins or a draw is agreed.

=== Major championship tournaments ===
The World Diplomacy Convention (WDC or World DipCon) is held annually in different places in the world. The winner of WDC is considered to be the World Champion of Diplomacy. WDC was first held in 1988 in Birmingham, England, and was held at two-year intervals before becoming an annual event. WDC's site moves among four regions: North America, Europe, Australasia, and the rest of the world, with a requirement that successive WDC's are always held in different regions.

The North American Diplomacy Convention (DipCon) is held annually in different places in North America, to determine the North American Champion of Diplomacy. DipCon was first held in 1966 in Youngstown, Ohio. DipCon's site rotates among West, Central, and East regions.

The European Diplomacy Convention (Euro DipCon) is held annually in different places in Europe, to determine the European Champion of Diplomacy.

Over a dozen other countries hold face-to-face national championship tournaments.

=== Other major face-to-face tournaments ===
Many of the larger multi-game conventions, such as the World Boardgaming Championships, Gen Con, Origins, Carnage Gaming Convention, ManorCon, TempleCon, and Dragonflight also host Diplomacy tournaments. On occasion, WDC or DipCon will be held in conjunction with one of these conventions.

In addition, many of the larger local and regional clubs host tournaments on an annual basis and always encourage visitors from the local area as well as any travelers from around the globe.

=== Major play-by-email tournaments ===
The play-by-email field is constantly changing. There are numerous tournaments generally associated with different websites. As of 2008 there were no official events sanctioned by the manufacturer (Wizards/Avalon Hill). There have been and continue to be events with various sizes and self designated titles such as:

- World Masters – every two years in the Worldmasters E-mail Tournament composed of both team and individual events
- Diplomacy World Cup – modeled after a Soccer World Cup (players are in teams competing by countries), there have been two world cups so far and a third is under way. The first took place 2007-9 and was won by France, the second 2010-12 and was won by Ireland, and the third version started in January 2013.
- Winter Blitz – The 4th Annual Winter Blitz became open to join in 2011.

== Other ways to play ==
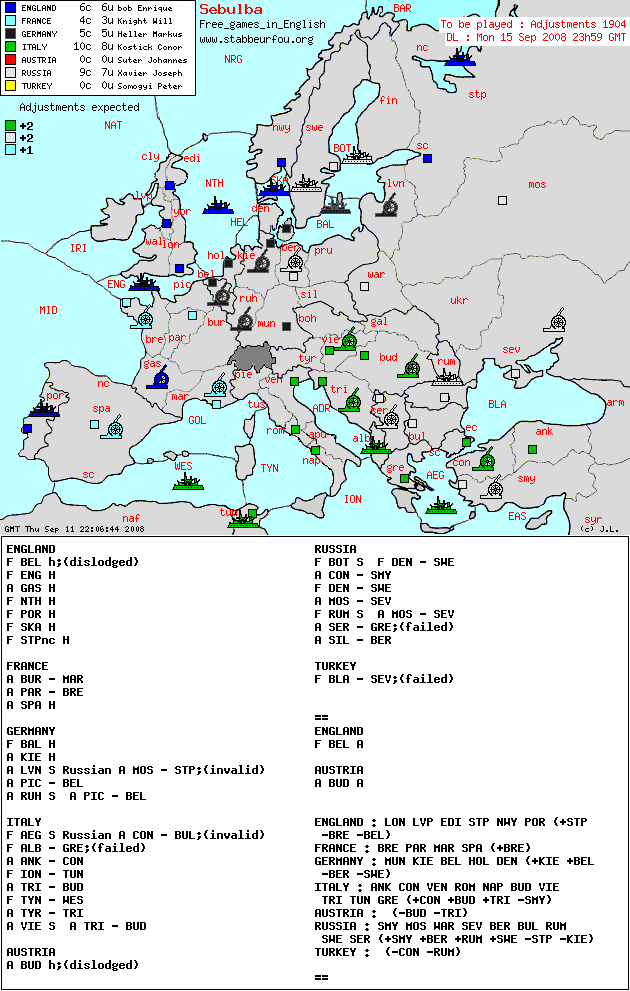
A map generated by the online Diplomacy game stabbeurfou

Despite the length of face-to-face Diplomacy games, there are people who organize and host games, and there are also various clubs that have annual tournaments and monthly club games.

To overcome the difficulty of assembling enough players for a sufficiently large block of time together, a play-by-mail game community has developed, either via Postal or Internet Diplomacy, using either humans to adjudicate the turns or automatic adjudicators. The current largest example of a dedicated online Diplomacy server with automatic adjudicators is Backstabbr, developed by Tile Games. Another Diplomacy website with ranked play and a modern interface is Atlas Diplomacy, developed by Atlas Digital Commerce.

=== Postal and email play ===
Since the 1960s, Diplomacy has been played by mail through fanzines. The play-by-mail (PBM) hobby was created in 1963 by Dr. John Boardman of New York City. He did so in carbon-copied typed flyers, recruiting players through his science fiction fanzine Knowable. His flyers became an ongoing publication under the Graustark title, and led directly to the formation of other zines. Dungeons & Dragons co-creator Gary Gygax was also a Diplomacy PBM player in the 1960s.

By May 1965 there were eight Diplomacy zines. By the end of 1967 there were dozens of zines in the US, and by 1970 their editors were holding gatherings. In 1969, Don Turnbull started the first UK-based Diplomacy zine, Albion. These were "affectionately" known as "Dippy zines". Prior to the 1980s, most had circulations of about 50 subscribers, but some had hundreds.

By 1972, both the US and UK hobbies were forming organizations. In the 1980s, there were over sixty zines, such as Diplomacy World and the like, in the main list of the North American Zine Poll, peaking at 72 zines in 1989; and there were nearly as many in the major Zine Poll of the British part of the hobby.

Competition was fierce, leading some Diplomacy PBM players to "go to great lengths to win". In the UK, this included, in a few cases, bribery, blackmail, and even forging mail from other players or the Gamemaster, as well as mail interference (for example altering a letter to ensure a missed deadline was marked in time by a forged postmark). According to reviewer Martin Croft, in the early 1980s,

Two players managed to get into trouble with the police ... [while] involved in complex negotiations about an attack on the gamer playing Britain. To avoid postal delays, one sent the other a telegram which read ATTACK ON LIVERPOOL CONFIRMED. Both spent some time explaining to the police that it was only a game.

In the 1990s and 2000s, the number of postal Diplomacy zines has reduced as new players instead joined the part of the hobby that plays over the internet via e-mail or on websites. In April 2010, Graustark itself ceased publication. As of 2026, there are still a few active postal zines published in the US, one each in Canada and Australia, and several in the UK and elsewhere. In order to reduce postage and printing costs, as well as for environmental reasons, several zines are distributed to subscribers via emailed links to the zine's web page when a new issue appears, or are emailed out as PDF files, for subscribers to read on screen or print out as they choose. A few zines maintain a dual existence as paper and digital publications. God Save The Zine regularly reviews all extant Diplomacy zines. The UK Diplomacy Archive also maintains a list of zines that are still publishing.

The first known electronic Diplomacy zine was Mad As Hell, distributed on Usenet in 1982. Diplomacy has been played through e-mail on the Internet since the 1983 debut of The Armchair Diplomat on Compuserve. The GEnie online service offered fully automated versions of Diplomacy and variants to subscribers.

=== Diplomacy computer games ===
Screenshot from the Paradox computer game

Avalon Hill released a computer game version of Diplomacy in 1984 for the IBM PC. Computer Gaming World in 1987 stated that its computer opponents "simply stay the appetite of zealous Diplomacy players until they can gather flesh and blood victims". The magazine in 1994 described it as "a flop".

Hasbro Interactive released a computer game version of Diplomacy (called Avalon Hill's Diplomacy) in 1999 under the MicroProse label, and developed by Meyer/Glass Interactive. A major fault, like with the Avalon Hill version, was that the computer AI was considered poor, one reviewer remarking "Gamers of any skill level will have no trouble whatsoever whaling on the computer at even the highest difficulty setting."

Paradox Interactive released a new computer version in 2005, which was given negative reviews, partly due to the odd grunts the game used to express the reactions of the AI players during the Movement phase. None of the computer games supported either text or voice chat, which limited the possibilities for complicated alliances. In 2011, artificial intelligence scholars noted that work on Diplomacy-focused AI has been carried out since mid-1980s, but so far this endeavour met "little success".

The first artificial-intelligence Diplomacy conquest was organized in 2015 as part of the International Computer Game Association. The first place in the contest was won by Dave de Jonge.

In November 2022, Meta Platforms announced that they had developed an AI to play Diplomacy online at a competitive level, ranking in the top 10% of players.

== Reception ==
In his 1977 book The Comprehensive Guide to Board Wargaming, Nick Palmer thought that despite "primitive" movement and combat rules, "the game has an extraordinary charm all its own, based on the fascinating interplay of alliances between the seven players". He concluded, "This can be strongly recommended to anyone interested in games of multi-player negotiation".

In the 1980 book The Complete Book of Wargames, game designer Jon Freeman called this game "Probably the most famous wargame in existence ... The double-dealing required attracts some people irresistibly and repels others just as strongly, but the interaction in Diplomacy is the model for all other 'power politics' games." Freeman only had two issues with the game: "the number of players required and the time it takes to play." Freeman gave the game an overall evaluation of "Excellent", concluding, "This is a classic game in every sense of the word."

Benjamin Monk, Jr. reviewed the Deluxe Version of Diplomacy in White Wolf #36 (1993), rating it a 2 out of 5 and stated that "My advice is this: buy regular edition Diplomacy now and start putting your spare change in a jar. By the time you've lost half your pieces, scratches your board, and lost your conference maps, you'll have enough to buy the deluxe. If you already own a regular edition copy, keep it. It'll do just fine."

The Wargamer reviewed the Hasbro re-release and concluded: "A word of warning: Diplomacy may become habit-forming and life-consuming. Indulge at your own risk."

In its catalog, Avalon Hill advertised Diplomacy as the favorite game of John F. Kennedy. Gyles Brandreth, in the UK magazine Games & Puzzles claimed Diplomacy was Henry Kissinger's favorite game. American broadcast journalist Walter Cronkite is reported to have been a fan of the game. Michael Portillo, British journalist, broadcaster, and former Member of Parliament and cabinet minister, is known to have played the game while studying at Harrow County School for Boys.

Diplomacy was inducted into the Academy of Adventure Gaming Arts and Design Adventure Hall of Fame in 1994.

Diplomacy was chosen for inclusion in the 2007 book Hobby Games: The 100 Best. Game designer Larry Harris explained: "I am convinced that Allan Calhamer's masterpiece should be part of every high school curriculum. Don't tell the kids, but it teaches history, geography, the art of political negotiation, and something else – some healthy critical skepticism. By the time you get into high school, you have a pretty good idea that not everyone always tells the truth. But a good game of Diplomacy helps you to understand how skillful some people can be at fooling you!"

=== Other reviews and commentary ===
- Games #2
- 1980 Games 100 in Games
- 1981 Games 100 in Games
- 1982 Games 100 in Games
- Jeux & Stratégie #6

== See also ==
- List of play-by-mail games
- Slobbovia
