= Celebrity (game) =

Party game

Celebrity (also known as Celebrities, The Hat Game, Lunchbox, Fish Bowl, Salad Bowl, or The Name Game) is a party game similar to Charades, where teams play against each other to guess as many celebrity names as possible before time runs out.

== Gameplay ==
One team is chosen to go first, and that team selects a player to give clues to the rest of their team. Play begins when the clue-giver picks a name out of the hat. From that moment, they have one minute to get their team to correctly guess as many celebrity names as possible before time runs.

The clue-giver can say anything they want as long as it is not any part of the celebrity's name or a direct reference to the name. For Dolly Parton, it is acceptable to say, "She has her own theme park in Tennessee", but not, "She has a themepark called 'Dollywood'." It is also illegal to give clues such as, "Her name begins with a 'D'." It is permissible to use other similar named people as clues. For example, "President Madison's wife's first name is the same as this person."

When the team guesses the celebrity name correctly, the clue-giver draws another name from the hat and continues until time is up or there are no more names in the hat. If an illegal clue is given, that name is set aside and another name is drawn from the hat.

When time is up, the current name is reinserted into the unguessed collection. This allows for a particularly difficult name to be guessed by several players on both sides. The team is awarded a point for every name they guessed correctly. They lose a point for every illegal clue that was given. Alternatively, if an illegal clue is given, the round ends immediately. At the end of the game, all clues will be gone, and you can simply add up cards held by each team to determine a winner.

The next team then picks a clue-giver and play continues until there are no more names in the hat. Teams must rotate the clue-giver each round until every member of the team has been given a chance.

=== Variant rules ===
- You can play the game in three rounds (and sometimes four), using the instructions above as round 1. After all of the names have been guessed in round 1, they are returned to the hat. The second round proceeds in the same manner except that the clue-giver is now limited to only one word. The word can be repeated many times, but only one word is allowed. In some versions of the game, sounds and hand & body gestures are not allowed this round, while in other versions, hand and body gestures are permitted. In the third round, the clue-giver cannot speak at all, but must suggest the name to their teammates using hand motions, gestures, and pantomiming, similar to the party game Charades. After all the names have been guessed in the third round, the team with the most points is declared the winner. In this version of the game it is important to remind the players to pay attention to the descriptions at all times. They need to learn about the named people in case they have to describe or guess it in the following round(s).
- Round 2 can be played with a two- or three-word limit.
- The game is often limited to a single round. Since this shortens game-time, more names are generally added to start.
- Some groups allow a player to "pass" on a celebrity, putting it aside and going on to the next celebrity. At the end of the round, the score is the number of correctly guessed celebrities minus the number passed, and the passed celebrities go back into the hat. This variant can be difficult for beginners, as they tend to give up and pass on a difficult looking celebrity too quickly.
- Another pass variant allows passing in the first round, but not the second or third rounds.
- A scoring variant is to not subtract a point for an illegal clue but to treat it like a pass.
- A variant of Celebrity is known as Forehead Detective. In this variant, each player must guess a celebrity on their adjacent person's forehead using only yes or no questions.
- Celebrity is sometimes called "The Name Game". In this variant, no personal names at all are permitted during rounds 1 and 2. (For instance, it would not be legal to clue "He was in a band with Paul, George, and Ringo" for the name "John Lennon," because Paul, George, and Ringo are all personal names. "He was in the Beatles" or "He grew up in Liverpool" would be fine, as only personal names are forbidden.) Additionally, there are no teams; all players sit in a circle, and each clue-giver only clues to one player at a time, with the pairs permuting after each round. Both the giver and the guesser receive a point for each correct guess in a thirty-second period.
- A variation called "Themed Celebrities" has each member use a common theme amongst their Celebrity names (i.e., starred in Steven Spielberg movies, redheads, etc.) This adds a theme-guessing component to the game. After a person completes a turn, he/she has the opportunity to guess what one of the themes is (You obviously cannot guess your own theme). If a theme is guessed correctly (as judged by the person who put that theme in), the guesser's team gets 5 points. You can only guess one theme per turn and you cannot discuss possible theme guesses during your turn. When it is not your turn, you may discuss possible theme guesses amongst your team (without giving away the theme that you put in). Some have also referred to this as the Hokey Pokey version, but it is more commonly referred to under the codename Ted.
- Another variant is if a team has no more names to guess in a given round they may use the time they have left and start off the next round.
- Another version, which was described as "the Name Game," is to play not as teams but individuals. In round 1 everyone reads to the next person: player A picks names and player B guesses them, then B picks and C guesses, then C picks and D guesses, until all players have done both. Then in round 2 everyone reads to the person 2 away: player A picks names and C guesses, then B picks and D guesses, etc. And so forth until you run out of names (usually about 4 of these rounds), not counting points from a round that was not complete because you ran out of names in the hat. Both reader and guesser get one point for each name successfully guessed.
- Another version, which was described as "Fish Bowl", includes a standard 3 rounds. Players are split into two teams. All players contribute 3–5 words containing common phrases, celebrities, or nouns. All word cards are added to a vessel resembling a fish bowl (hence the name). During a turn, one player from Team A takes one word card out of the bowl and engages in the rules of the round until a team member guesses the word. The player then draws another word, and continues until 30 seconds to 1 minute has elapsed. One Team B player follows Team A. A round continues until all words have been guessed. All words are returned to the fish bowl, and the next round beings. Round One consists of Catch Phrase (game), where players can use unlimited words to give clues (except words that rhyme). Round 2 follows the rules of Charades. Round 3 follows the words of password, where the clue giver can only give a one-word clue. Round 4 is an optional additional round where players repeat the rules of charades with a bed sheet covering their body.

== Commercial versions ==
Boxed commercial versions of the games have been sold under the names Time's Up!, Monikers, and Rabble.

== See also ==
- Catch Phrase (game)
