= Draw & Guess =

2021 video game

- Developer: Acureus
- Publisher: Acureus
- Engine: Unity
- Platforms: Microsoft Windows; macOS; Linux; Android; iOS
- Release: March 12th, 2021 (PC); December 15th, 2025 (iOS, Android)
- Genres: Party, Guessing game
- Mode: Multiplayer

Draw & Guess is a word-guessing drawing game, developed by the independent game studio Acureus, where players draw pictures for other players to guess. It was released for Microsoft Windows, Linux and macOS on March 21, 2021, later releasing on Android and iOS on December 15th 2025.

After its initial release in 2021, the game received a complete visual overhaul on February 22nd 2024.

== Gameplay ==
There are four modes in the game: Whisper, Stage, Robot, and Battle Royale.

Whisper is a 4-16 player mode where each player is given a subject in words and must express what it is by drawing it. When it was finished, it will be passed on the next player. The next player must guess what it is, and the word will be passed on the next player. At the end of each round, players will vote on whether the final word equals to the original word. The player who passed the vote will get a trophy.

Stage is a 2-16 player mode where one player is given a word and must express what it is by drawing it, while other players must try to guess it as quickly as possible.

Robot is a 1-16 player mode where players choose one of three words prompted by an in-game robot called GU-355 with varying difficulties. After drawing, GU-355 will grade the image based on a machine learning model built through user-submitted images in the Whisper and Stage game modes.

Battle Royale is a 8-63 player game mode that takes the model used in the Robot game mode, and scales it up to a battle royale format set in space fighting a giant virus-infected version of GU-355 where players draw the same prompt, and the lowest-match drawers are ejected from their space ships. Winning the game mode rewards an exclusive in-game skin for Tomoko.

== Reception ==
Chinese gaming website GamerSky rated the game 8.3 out of 10.

Kaisei Hanyu of AUTOMATON says that its popularity in China is likely because it is part of an already popular genre and has the perfect name to attract those who enjoy it.

Mio of IGN Japan says that there are not many parts where this work is particularly superior to other similar works.

Dustin Bailey of PCGamesN says that the game's popularity is predominantly focused in China, and its player counts drop off harshly outside of peak times in that region.

A press release in 2026 cited Draw & Guess approaching 5 million copies sold via Steam
