= Concept (board game) =

2013 board game

- Designers: Gaëtan Beaujannot, Alain Rivollet
- Illustrators: Éric Azagury, Cédric Chevalier
- Publishers: Repos Production
- Genres: Board game Party game Deduction game
- Players: 4-12
- Playing time: 40 minutes

Concept is a deduction party board game released in 2013. The game was designed by Alain Rivollet and Gaëtan Beaujannot and published by Repos Production. It has collected multiple awards and nominations including the Jeu de l'Année prize in Cannes in 2014.

Later, in 2018 the kids edition of the game Concept Kids: Animals was released tailored for children aged 4 and up.

== Rules ==
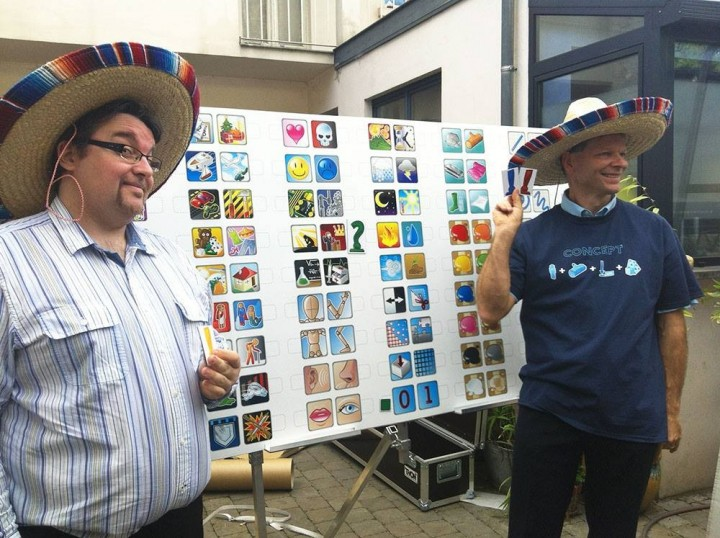
Gaëtan Beaujannot (left) and Alain Rivollet (right) presenting Concept in 2013.

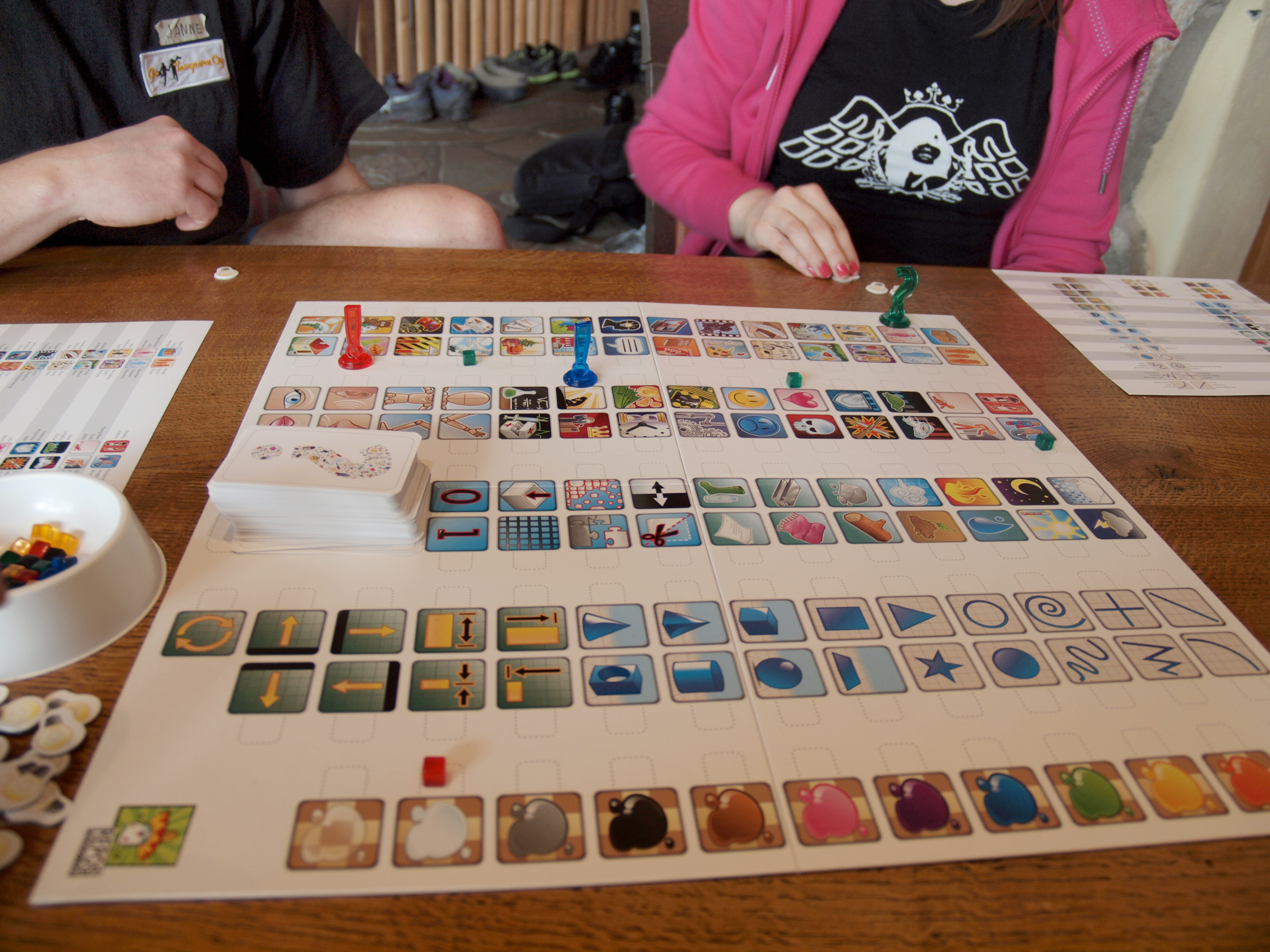
Concept during play.

Concept is a guessing game where players have to guess a concept, such as a word, a name, or a phrase. The players who know the target concept provide hints by marking its attributes and attributes of related concepts on the game board with different-coloured markers, while other players guess. Giving verbal hints is not allowed.

The official rules state that the game is played with teams of two players each. On each team's turn, they draw a card and choose a concept from there. Each card has three difficulty levels (blue, red and black) with three concepts each.

The team then places a green question mark on the picture illustrating the main category of the concept. They can then further specify the concept with green cubes defining the attributes of the concept and optionally also specify related concepts with red, blue, yellow and black exclamation points and accordingly coloured cubes.

The other teams then try to guess the concept. The player who guesses correctly gains one double VP (Victory Point) token while the team who chose the concept gain one single VP token each. The game then proceeds with the next team.

Once every double VP token has been used, the game ends. The player with the most VPs wins.

The game rules state that using teams is not mandatory, the game can also be played with each player playing against each other.

== Reception ==
The game received generally positive reviews with Board Game Quest suggesting that it provides "a good amount of fun in a very accessible game" and Board Games Land describing it as "a perfect alternative to Charades".

== Awards and nominations ==
- 2015 Vuoden Peli Party Game of the Year Nominee
- 2015 Gouden Ludo Nominee
- 2014 Tric Trac Nominee
- 2014 Spiel des Jahres Nominee
- 2014 Spiel der Spiele Hit mit Freunden Recommended
- 2014 Lys Grand Public Winner
- 2014 Lys Grand Public Finalist
- 2014 Juego del Año Finalist
- 2014 Hra roku Winner
- 2014 Hra roku Nominee
- 2014 Golden Geek Best Party Board Game Nominee
- 2014 As d'Or - Jeu de l'Année Winner
- 2014 As d'Or - Jeu de l'Année Nominee
- 2013 Meeples' Choice Nominee
- 2013 Golden Geek Best Party Board Game Nominee
