= Morphman =

1993 video game

- Developers: Dynamic Dimension Development, Inc.
- Publishers: Dynamic Dimension Development, Inc.
- Platform: Windows 3.x
- Release: 1993

Morphman is an interactive CGI movie released in 1993 by Dynamic Dimension Development, Inc. The game follows the titular Morphman, who must use shape-shifting technology to save its creator from a rogue faction that wants to use his research for evil. The gameplay has been compared to Dragon's Lair. It is the only game ever released by Dynamic Dimension Development.

== Reception ==
Joystick compared the protagonist to "Ronald McDonald on a diet of light hamburgers" and said "It's stupid and we like it". They considered the video to be "quite good quality". Computer Game Review said the locations have "an attractive, texture-mapped look" but criticized the look of the protagonist, lack of interactivity and compared the gameplay to a guessing game. A review in Hyper called it a "dull and somewhat pathetic attempt at a game". Computer Gaming World thought the game concept was interesting but felt like "there is little you can really do".
