= Taboo (game) =

1989 word guessing party game

The game of unspeakable fun
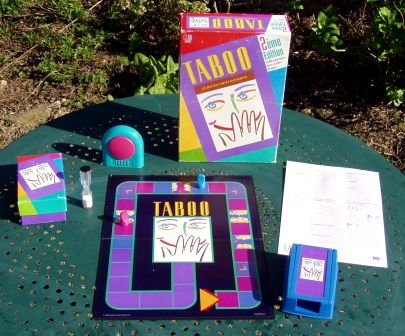
- Designers: Brian Hersch
- Illustrators: Andrea Uderzo
- Publishers: Hasbro
- Publication: 1989; 37 years ago
- Genres: Party game
- Players: 4-10
- Setup time: 1 minute
- Playing time: 20 - 60 minutes
- Age range: 12+
- Skills: verbal skills

Taboo is a word, guessing, and party game published by Parker Brothers in 1989 (subsequently purchased by Hasbro). The objective of the game is for a player to have their partners guess the word on the player's card without using the word itself or five additional words listed on the card.

The game is similar to Catch Phrase, also from Hasbro, in which a player tries to get their teammates to guess words using verbal clues.

From 2003, a TV game show adaptation ran on TNN, hosted by Chris Wylde.

== Equipment ==
- A large number of double sided cards. Early Taboo editions had pink lettering one side, and blue the other side. Later editions used a variety of colors for the cards on either side, such as pink, blue, green, purple, yellow, orange and red. The guess word is at the top of the card and five taboo words below. These words are not to be spoken by the clue-giver.
- Box to keep the cards in (1989 to 2000).
- Tray for holding cards.
- Timer (in the form of a one-minute hourglass).
- Buzzer or round squeaker. The 1989 edition has a turquoise electronic buzzer. The 1990, 1993 and 1994 editions have a pink squeaker. The 1999 and 2000 editions have a purple squeaker or electronic buzzer. 2003 edition has a red squeaker. The 2011 edition has a yellow and white electronic buzzer. 2013 edition has a purple squeaker. The 2016 edition has a purple buzzer. The 2023 edition has a yellow squeaker.
- Score pad and (pencil - mainly in early editions).
- Game board includes two tokens for moving around the board. The 1996, 2000 (UK & European), 2003 and 2010 editions only have the game board. The game board is the same design, and has same number of spaces, the only difference is colour. However, the 2000 edition is unique in its colour design and stands out against the other game boards.
- Game-changing die, this was used in the 2011 and 2013 editions only.

In 1990, Hasbro sold packs of additional words, but they are no longer in production.

Taboo Junior, the game for younger players, includes a purple squeaker.

== Rules ==
An even number of players from four to ten sit alternating around in a circle. Players take turns as the "giver", who attempts to prompt their teammates to guess as many keywords as possible in the allotted time. However, each card also has "taboo" (forbidden) words listed which may not be spoken. Should the giver say one, a "censor" on the opposing team hits the buzzer and the giver must move on to the next word. For example, the giver might have to get their team to deduce the word "baseball" without offering the words "sport", "game", "pastime", "hitter", "pitcher", or "baseball" itself as clues. The giver may not say a part of a "taboo" word. For example, using "base" in "baseball" is taboo. Nor may they use a form of a word. For example, if the word was "wedding" and the taboo words are "marriage", "bride", "groom", "nuptials", or "honeymoon", the words "marry" and "bridal" would not be allowed. The giver may only use speech to prompt their teammates. Gestures, sounds (e.g., barking), or drawings are not allowed. Singing is permitted, provided the singer is singing words rather than humming or whistling a tune. The giver's hints may not rhyme with a taboo word or be an abbreviation of a taboo word.

While the giver is prompting the teammates, they may make as many guesses as they want with no penalties for wrong guesses. Once the team correctly guesses the word exactly as written on the card, the giver moves on to the next word, trying to get as many words as possible in the allotted time. When time runs out, play passes to the next adjacent player of the other team. The playing team receives one point for correct guesses and one penalty point if "taboo" words are spoken.
