= Guessing =

Swift conclusion drawn from data directly at hand

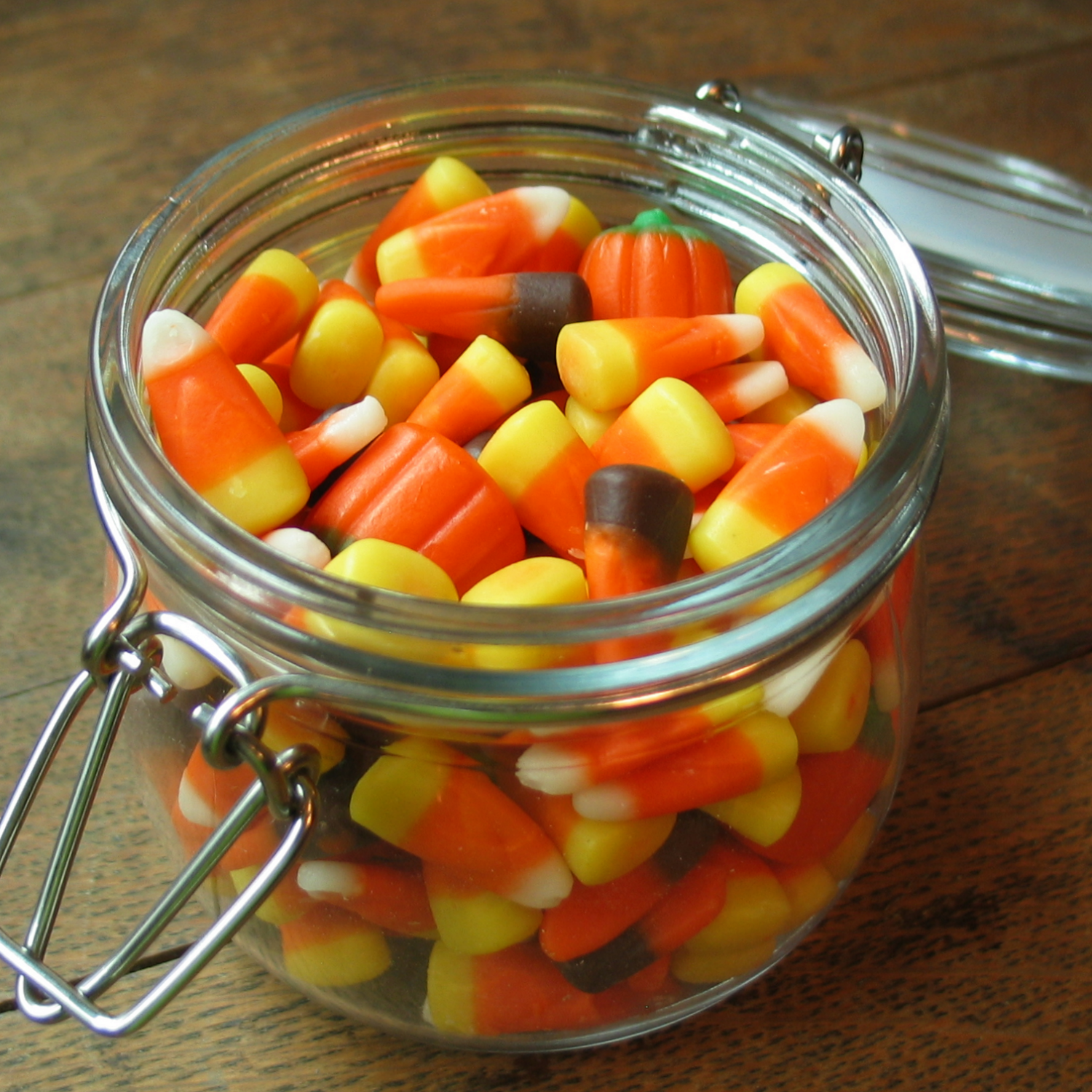
The exact number of candy pieces in this jar cannot be determined by looking at it, because not all of the pieces are visible. The amount must be guessed or estimated.

Guessing is the act of drawing a swift conclusion, called a guess, from data directly at hand, which is then held as probable or tentative, while the person making the guess (the guesser) admittedly lacks material for a greater degree of certainty.

A guess is an unstable answer, as it is "always putative, fallible, open to further revision and interpretation, and validated against the horizon of possible meanings by showing that one interpretation is more probable than another in light of what we already know". In many of its uses, "the meaning of guessing is assumed as implicitly understood", and the term is therefore often used without being meticulously defined.

Guessing may combine elements of deduction, induction, abduction, and the purely random selection of one choice from a set of given options. Guessing may also involve the intuition of the guesser, who may have a "gut feeling" about which answer is correct without necessarily being able to articulate a reason for having this feeling.

== Gradations ==
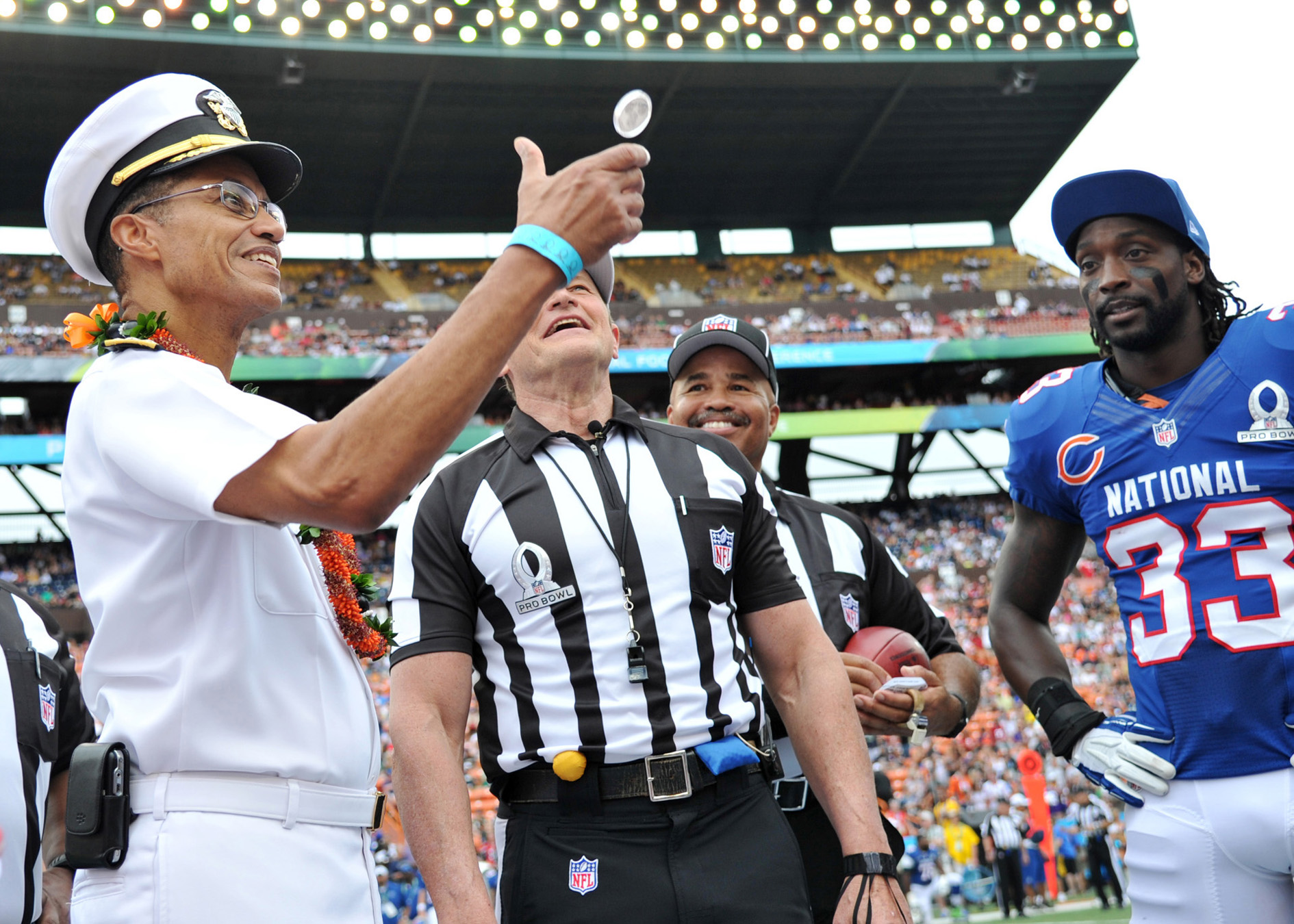
Calling a coin toss to determine which team will take the offense at a sporting event is a paradigm case of a guess that requires minimal consideration of forces influencing the outcome.

Philosopher Mark Tschaepe, who has written extensively on the scientific and epistemological role of guessing, has noted that there are often-overlooked "gradations" of guessing — that is, different kinds of guesses susceptible to different levels of confidence. Tschaepe defines guessing as "an initial, deliberate originary activity of imaginatively creating, selecting, or dismissing potential solutions to problems or answers to questions as a volitional response to those problems or questions when insufficient information is available to make merely a deduction and/or induction to the solution or answer". He objects to definitions that describe guessing as either forming a "random or insufficiently formed opinion", which Tschaepe deems too ambiguous to be helpful, or "to instantaneously happen upon an opinion without reasoning". Tschaepe notes that in the latter case, the guess might appear to occur without reasoning, when in fact a reasoning process may be occurring so quickly in the mind of the guesser that it does not register as a process. This reflects the observation made centuries before by Gottfried Wilhelm Leibniz, that "when I turn one way rather than another, it is often because of a series of tiny impressions of which I am not aware". Tschaepe quotes the description given by William Whewell, who says that this process "goes on so rapidly that we cannot trace it in its successive steps".

A guess that "is merely a hunch or is groundless... is arbitrary and of little consequence epistemologically". A guess made with no factual basis for its correctness may be called a wild guess. Jonathan Baron has said that "[t]he value of a wild guess is l/N + l/N - l/N = l/N", meaning that taking a true wild guess is no different from choosing an answer at random. Philosopher David Stove described this process as follows:

A paradigm case of guessing is, when captains toss a coin to start a cricket match, and one of them 'calls', say "heads". This cannot be a case of knowledge, scientific knowledge or any other, if it is a case of guessing. If the captain knows that the coin will fall heads, it is just logically impossible for him also to guess that it will. More than that, however: guessing, at least in such a paradigm case, does not even belong on what may be called the epistemic scale. That is, if the captain, when he calls "heads", is guessing, he is not, in virtue of that, believing, or inclining to think, or conjecturing, or anything of that sort, that the coin will fall heads. And in fact, of course, he normally is not doing any of these things when he guesses. He just calls. And this is guessing, whatever else is.

In such an instance, there not only is no reason for favoring "heads" or "tails", but everyone knows this to be the case. Tschaepe also addresses the guess made in a coin flip, contending that it merely represents an extremely limited case of guessing a random number. Tschaepe examines such guesses at greater length with the instance of guessing a number between 1 and 100, for which Tschaepe notes that the guesser "has to look for clues that are specific to what or whom is ordering them to guess, as well as possible past scenarios that involved guessing numbers", and once these are exhausted, "there comes a point very early in the process wherein no other clue to an answer exists". As an exemplary case of guessing that involves progressively more information from which to make a further guess, Tschaepe notes the game of Twenty Questions, which he describes as "similar to guessing a number that the other person is thinking, but unlike guessing a number as a singular action... allows for combining abductive reasoning with deductive and inductive reasoning".

An apparently unreasoned guess that turns out to be correct may be called a happy guess, or a lucky guess, and it has been argued that "a 'lucky guess' is a paradigm case of a belief that does not count as knowledge". Jane Austen, in Emma, has the titular character respond to a character calling a match that she made a "lucky guess" by saying that "a lucky guess is never merely luck. There is always some talent in it". As Tschaepe notes, William Whewell stated that certain scientific discoveries "are not improperly described as happy Guesses; and that Guesses, in these as in other instances, imply various suppositions made, of which some one turns out to be the right one".

By contrast, a guess made using prior knowledge to eliminate clearly wrong possibilities may be called an informed guess or an educated guess. Uninformed guesses can be distinguished from the kind of informed guesses that lead to the development of a scientific hypothesis. Tschaepe notes: "This process of guessing is distinct from that of a coin toss or picking a number." Daniel Wueste wrote: "When a decision must be made, the educated guess of the experts will be the best basis for a decision — an educated guess is better than an uneducated guess."

An estimate is one kind of educated guess, although often one that involves making a numerical determination, and using some knowledge of known or observable variables to determine the most likely number or range of numbers. Wild estimation is a matter of selecting one possible answer from a set with little or no reason. Another kind of guessing is conjecture, particularly as used in mathematics to refer to a conclusion or proposition which appears to be correct based on incomplete information, but for which no proof has been found.

== Uses ==
Tschaepe notes that "guessing has been indicated as an important part of scientific processes, especially with regard to hypothesis-generation". Regarding scientific hypothesis-generation, Tschaepe has stated that guessing is the initial, creative process involved in abductive reasoning wherein new ideas are first suggested. Following the work of Charles S. Peirce, guessing is "a combination of musing and logical analysis."

Science is done by making educated guesses about how the world works and then testing those guesses by doing experiments. Such an educated guess is called a hypothesis.

People learn to guess at an early age, and there are many guessing games played by children. In practice, children may find themselves in situations where "guessing is the only strategy they have available to them". In order to cope with these situations, children develop "(1) the ability to recognize situations in which guessing is the only reasonable strategy even though it provides no more than a gross estimate; (2) the ability to recognize that different levels of accuracy are possible and acceptable in different situations".

Certain kinds of exams, particularly those that involve multiple choice questions, attempt to penalize exam takers for guessing by giving a small negative score for each wrong answer, so that the average number of correct guesses will be offset by the combined penalty for the average number of incorrect guesses. In such a scenario, a guesser who can eliminate one or two wrong answers can gain overall by guessing from the remaining pool of answers.

According to Polanyi, guessing is the end result of a problem, observations of clues, and directedness toward solving the problem. Guessing is the action that brings about "a definite solution" (139). here is a definite process to guessing in Polanyi's account, although he does tend towards Whewell and Hempel in the comparison he makes between discovering hypotheses and Gestalt perception (144).

Guessing has been asserted to be necessary in literary theory, where "we have to guess the meaning of the text because the author's intention is beyond our reach". Because the reader can never put themselves in exactly the situation the author was in when the text was written, to construe the meaning of the text "is to make a guess".

=== Games ===
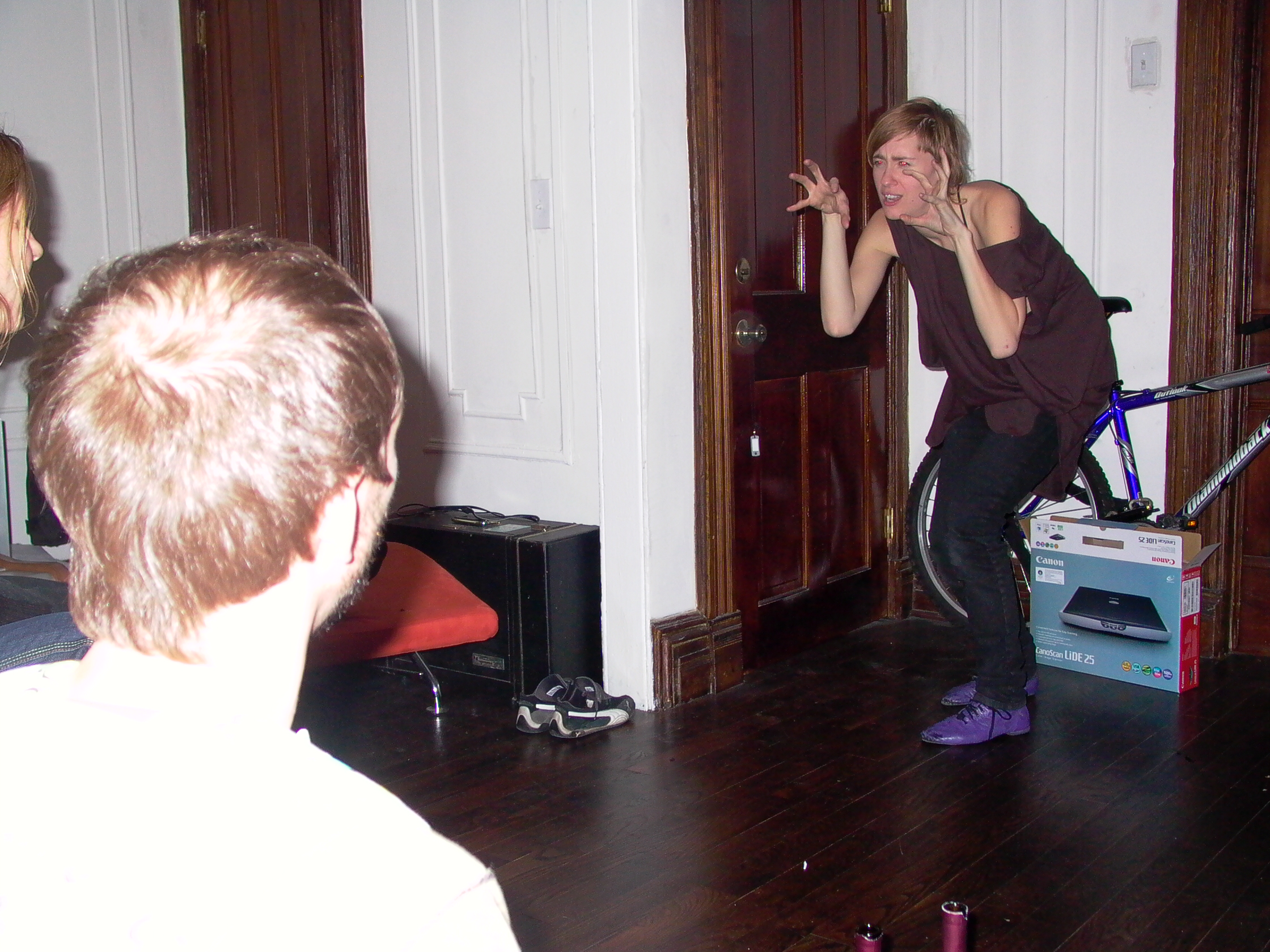
Game of Charades involves single person acting out a phrase, with the rest of the group guessing the phrase.

A guessing game is a game in which the object is to use guessing to discover some kind of information, such as a word, a phrase, a title, or the identity or location of an object. A guessing game has as its core a piece of information that one player knows, and the object is to coerce others into guessing that piece of information without actually divulging it in text or spoken word. Charades is probably the most well-known game of this type, and has spawned numerous commercial variants that involve differing rules on the type of communication to be given, such as Catch Phrase, Taboo, Pictionary, and similar. The genre also includes many game shows such as Win, Lose or Draw, Password and $25,000 Pyramid.

Many of the games are played co-operatively. In some games some player(s) know the answer, but cannot tell the other(s), instead they must help them to guess it. Guessing games are "readily adaptable for classroom use", as such a game "creates just enough tension to remain exciting, challenging, and competitive" for children, so long as the teacher designs effective rules "to eliminate unruly or unsportsmanship behavior". Children in therapy may initiate guessing games as a way to avoid talking about distressing issues, so some therapists prefer other kinds of games to facilitate communication.

Examples of guessing games include:

- 30 Seconds
- Battleship
- Botticelli
- Bulleribock
- Charades
- Hangman
- I spy
- Mastermind
- Name That Tune
- Pictionary
- Protmušis
- Taboo
- Time's Up!
- Twenty questions
- Ulam's game
- Guess Who?
- What's My Line?

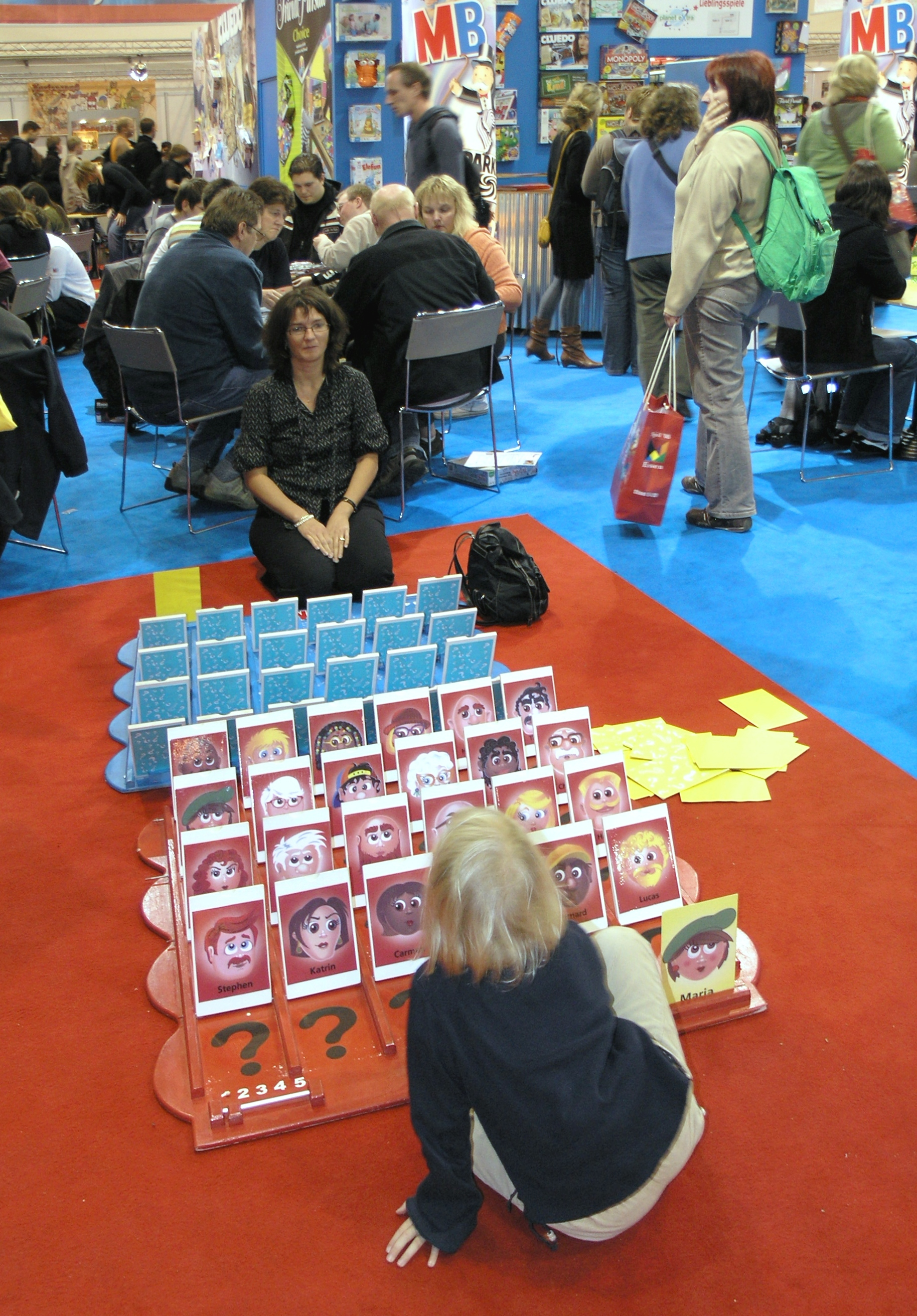
Two people playing Guess Who? board game at Spiel 2008

=== Software tests ===
In software testing, error guessing is a test method in which test cases used to find bugs in programs are established based on experience in prior testing. The scope of test cases usually rely on the software tester involved, who uses past experience and intuition to determine what situations commonly cause software failure, or may cause errors to appear. Typical errors include divide by zero, null pointers, or invalid parameters. Error guessing has no explicit rules for testing; test cases can be designed depending on the situation, either drawing from functional documents or when an unexpected/undocumented error is found while testing operations.

== Social impact ==
A study of guessing in social situations (for example, guessing someone's test score or potential salary) determined that there are situations where it is beneficial to intentionally either overguess (guess a higher amount) or underguess (guess a lower amount). The study noted that students who knew the score they had received on a test were happier when another person who did not know the score guessed a lower number; the lower guess gave the student the positive feeling of having exceeded expectations.

== See also ==
- Abductive reasoning
- Conjecture
- Error guessing
- List of Buddha games
- Syntax guessing
