= R&R Games =

Board game publisher

R&R Games, Inc.
- Type: Privately owned
- Industry: Entertainment, Games, Toys
- Founded: 1996
- Founder: Frank DiLorenzo; Edward Miller
- Headquarters: Tampa, Florida, U.S.
- Area served: International
- Key people: Frank DiLorenzo (Co-founder, President, CEO)
- Products: Board games, card games, toys
- Number of employees: -11 (as of Feb 2024) (2024)
- Website: rnrgames.com

R&R Games, Inc. is an international publisher and distributor of family entertainment products with a focus on original board games and toys. Since its formation in 1996 by Frank DiLorenzo & Edward Miller, they have published hundreds of games, and are best known for their casual, family oriented board games. Their bestselling games include Times Up!, Hanabi, and Rajas of the Ganges.

== Award-Winning Games ==
R&R Games has received many awards from notable board game reviewers including BoardGameGeek’s The Golden Geek, Mensa Select and The Dice Tower. Their most notable award-winning games include:

- Hanabi, Spiel Des Jahres Game of the Year Award
- Rajas of the Ganges, Spiel of Approval Award
- Time’s Up!, Mensa Select Winner and Golden Geek Award from BoardGameGeek
- Hide & Seek Safari Monkey II, Preferred Choice Award
- MiMiQ, NAPPA “Gold Award” Winner and “Laugh Out Loud” Award Winner
- Cup-A-Cup, Oppenheim Award Platinum
- Birds, Bugs and Beans, 2004 “Seal of Approval” from The National Parenting Center
- Slideways, “Figgie” Award for Most Innovative Game
- Mystic Paths, “Casual Game Recommended” by Casual Game Insider Report

== History and the Hidden Hunts ==
Frank DiLorenzo grew up playing board games with his five siblings. After losing his job as an engineer, he decided to go into board games. DiLorenzo began in 1996 with just a few games a year, beginning with Riddles & Riches. For the first few years in business, DiLorenzo indicated his company operated at a loss before it slowly broke even over time. It wasn't until 2000, four years post-Riddles & Riches, that it started turning a modest profit at 50,000 games a year. By 2008, he was selling over 75,000 games a year.

As a designer of treasure hunts, DiLorenzo wanted to imbue his games with the “mystique of hidden treasure adventure and excitement.” Riddles & Riches, an investigation and exploration pursuit experience themed as a treasure hunt, even included an actual treasure hunt within the game. Since then, many (if not all) of R&R’s games include a hidden treasure hunt within the game.

DiLorenzo has said that one of the primary puzzles revolves around what exactly what the letters in the term "R&R" represent. In many of his interviews, he’s suggested that treasures (including clues to the meaning of the company's name) have been hidden throughout many of their games through a process called Hidden Hunts. All of these Hidden Hunts provide prizes to the people who solve them. Being the first to solve a Hunt may merit a prize, cash or otherwise, and many of the Hunts have offered plenty of runner-up prizes as well. Hundreds of clues have already been found. R&R states that some Hidden Hunts still remain unsolved, including the meaning of R&R's name. More Hunts are released each year.
