= Takenoko (board game) =

2011 board game

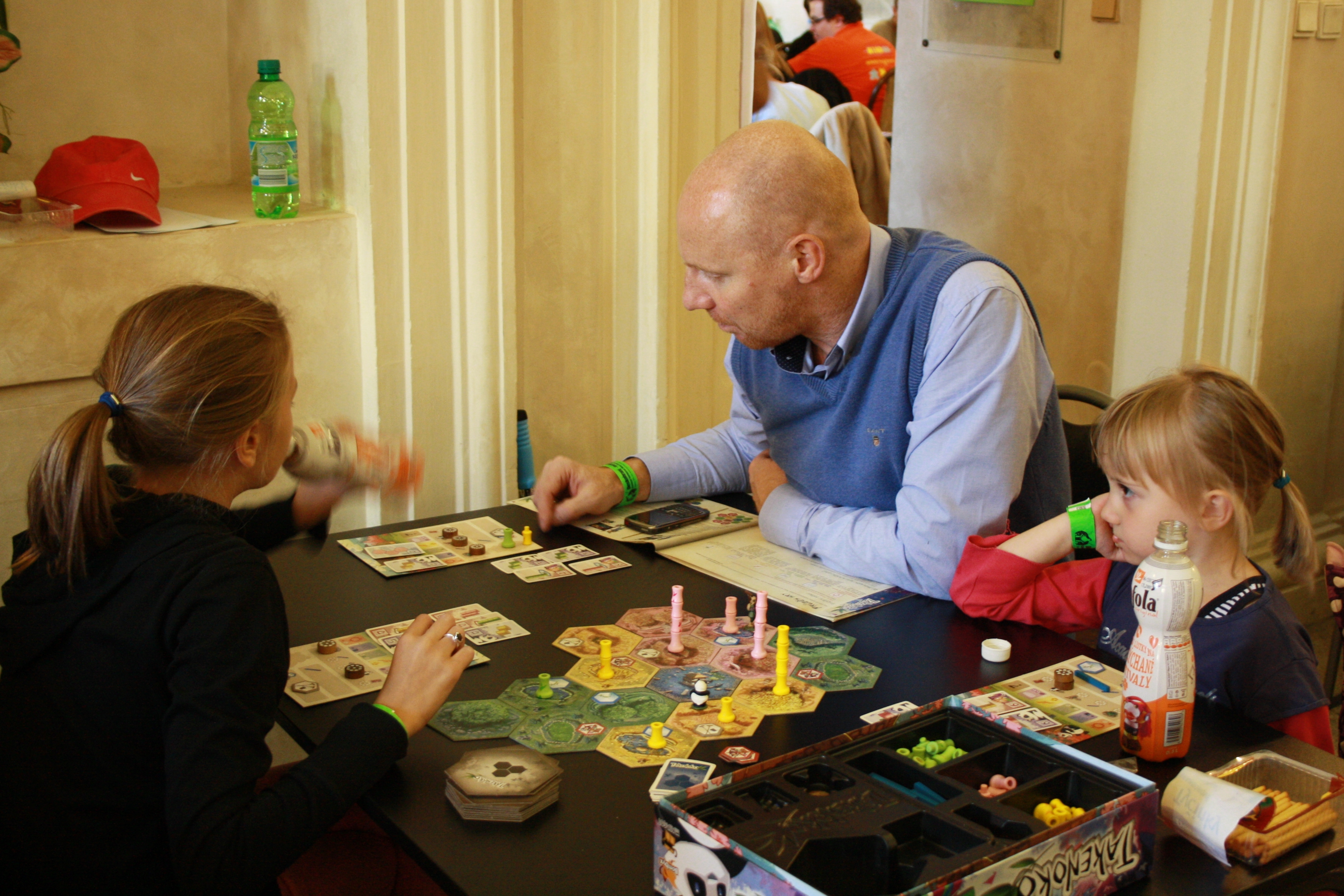
- A game of Takenoko in progress.
- Designers: Antoine Bauza
- Publishers: Bombyx; Matagot
- Players: 2–4
- Playing time: approx. 45 minutes

Takenoko (Japanese: タケノコ, which means bamboo shoot in katakana) is a board game created by Antoine Bauza and published by Bombyx and Matagot in 2011. Matagot also produced a Collector's Edition which features deluxe, over-sized pieces and game board.

== Premise and gameplay ==
Players control the gardener of the Japanese Emperor's bamboo garden, as well as its resident panda, a gift from the Emperor of China.

At the start of the game, the board consists only of the central pond of the bamboo garden - players take turns to plant new hexagonal bamboo plots (three colours green, yellow and pink), as well as to add irrigation and improvements to the plots, move the gardener to grow bamboo, and move the panda who eats the bamboo.

=== Turn structure ===
On each turn, players can choose between a number of different actions; laying a new plot on the garden, taking an irrigation channel from the stock, moving the gardener, moving the panda, or drawing a new objective card. On a regular turn, each player can pick any two of those actions.

However, there is also a die that determines the weather conditions for the round - sunny (pick three actions rather than two), rainy (choose a plot to grow more bamboo), storm (move the panda to any location), windy (can select same action twice) or cloudy (choose an improvement to place on a plot).

=== Objective cards ===
Players earn points by completing objective cards, which belong to one of three categories:

- Plot cards require a certain arrangement of coloured plots to be present on the garden. All plots must be irrigated in order to count.
- Gardener objective cards require certain colours of bamboo (sometimes with certain improvements) to be grown to various heights.
- Panda objectives require the panda to have eaten certain amounts of different colours of bamboo on that player's turns.

Players start the game with one objective card from each category, and can have up to a maximum of five in their hand. Cards have different point values, depending how difficult that particular objective is to complete (and sometimes the colours of plots or bamboo).

Plot and gardener objectives can be completed by either player; it is possible for a player to unknowingly complete an opponent's objectives through their placement of tiles, or movement of the gardener. However, panda objectives can only be completed by using the bamboo collected by that player.

The first player to reach a certain number of completed objectives (9 in a two-player game, 8 in a three-player game, 7 in a four-player game) receives a bonus Emperor card worth 2 points, and triggers the last round of the game.

== Expansion ==
The Takenoko: Chibis expansion adds a female panda and panda cubs to the game, as well as including new powerful bamboo plots and plot objectives.

== Awards ==
- As d'or Jeu de l'année (2012)
- Lys Grand Public (2012)
- Golden Geek Best Board Game Artwork/Presentation (2012)
- Games Magazine Best New Family Game (2013)
- Ludoteca Ideale Official Selection (2013)

== See also ==
- Hanabi (card game)
- 7 Wonders (board game)
- Terror in Meeple City
