= Ghost Stories (game) =

Fantasy board game

Ghost Stories is a fantasy-themed cooperative board game for 1-4 players designed by Antoine Bauza and published by Repos Production in 2008.

== Reception ==
Reviews:

- Rebel Times #14
- Shut Up & Sit Down
- Świat Gier Planszowych #9
- The Dice Tower
