= 7 Wonders (board game) =

2010 board game

- 2nd Edition (2020) box cover of 7 Wonders
- Designers: Antoine Bauza
- Publishers: Repos Production (Asmodee)
- Genres: Board Game
- Players: 2 to 7
- Setup time: 5 minutes
- Playing time: 30 minutes
- Chance: Medium
- Age range: 10+

7 Wonders is a board game created by Antoine Bauza in 2010 and originally published by Repos Production (part of Asmodee Group). Three decks of cards featuring images of historical civilizations, armed conflicts, and commercial activity are used in the card drafting game 7 Wonders. The game received critical success upon its release, and won numerous awards, including the inaugural Kennerspiel des Jahres connoisseurs' award in 2011.

== Gameplay ==
7 Wonders is a dedicated deck card game that features ancient civilizations. At the start of the game, each player randomly receives a gameboard called a "Wonder board". Each board depicts one of Antipater of Sidon's original Seven Wonders of the Ancient World. Players place cards representing various materials and structures around their Wonder boards. The boards are double-sided; the wonders on side A are generally easier to build, while those on side B grant more interesting benefits.

7 Wonders is played over three ages totalling 18 turns, known in the game as Ages I, II, and III, each using its own decks of cards. In each age, seven cards are randomly dealt to each player. The game uses a card-drafting mechanic in which, once per turn, each player selects a card to play from their hand, then passes the remaining cards (face-down) to the next player. This process is repeated until five out of the seven cards have been played. At this point, each player must choose to play one of their remaining two cards and discard the other.

Each age card represents a structure, and playing a card is referred to as building a structure. To build a structure, a player must first pay the construction cost, in coins or in one or more of the seven resource types, then lay it down by their Wonder board. A player lacking the resources available may pay their direct neighbors to use their resources, normally at two coins per resource, if available.

Some cards also belong to free construction chains. Cards played in previous ages can allow players to construct cards in ages 2 and 3 for free. For example, many of the science cards allow players to build several age 2 and 3 structures for free.

Instead of building a structure, a player may choose either to discard an Age card to earn three coins from the bank or to use the card to build a stage of their wonder. The Wonder boards have from two to four stages, shown at the bottom of the board. To build a wonder stage, a player must pay the resource cost listed on the stage, then put an age card underneath the wonder board in the appropriate place.

There are seven types of Age cards, representing different types of structures, which are determined by the color of their background:

1. Brown cards (raw materials) provide one or two of the four raw material resources used in the game (wood, ore, clay brick, and stone).
2. Grey cards (manufactured goods) provide one of the three manufactured goods used in the game (glass, papyrus, and textiles).
3. Red cards (military structures) contain "shield" symbols; these are added together to give a player's military strength, which is used in conflict resolution at the end of each age.
4. Blue cards (civic structures): all grant a fixed number of victory points.
5. Yellow cards (commercial structures) have several effects: they can grant coins, resources, and/or victory points or decrease the cost of buying resources from neighbors.
6. Green cards (scientific structures): each card has one of three symbols. Combinations of the symbols are worth victory points.
7. Purple cards (guilds) generally grant victory points based on the structures a player or their neighbors have built.

Brown and grey cards only appear in the Age I and II decks; purple cards only appear in the Age III deck.

At the end of each age, military conflicts are resolved between neighbors. This is done by comparing the number of shield symbols on the players' red cards, and awarding victory points accordingly. Once all three decks have been played, players tally their scores in all the different developed areas (civil, scientific, commercial, etc.). The player with the most victory points wins.

In the base game, there are seven means of obtaining victory points:

1. Military victories – one point for each victory (having the most shields) during the first age, 3 for the second age, and 5 for the third age. Each defeat makes a player lose 1 victory point regardless of the age.
2. Gold coins – one point for every 3 coins a player possesses at the end of the game.
3. Wonder stages – many of the wonder stages grant a fixed number of victory points.
4. Civic structures (blue cards) – each structure grants a fixed number of victory points.
5. Commercial structures (yellow cards) – Age III commercial structures grant victory points based on certain structures a player has built.
6. Guilds (purple cards) – the guilds provide several means of gaining victory points, most of which are based on the types of structure a player or their neighbors have built.
7. Scientific structures (green cards) – each green card has a symbol on it – tablet, compass, or gear. One card of a type grants one victory point, but two cards grant four; the number of points granted is equal to the number of symbols possessed squared. Additionally, each set of tablet, compass, and gear possessed is worth 7 points.

== Expansions ==
=== 7 Wonders: Leaders (2011) ===
This expansion introduces the white-backed leader cards, which can be recruited to aid a player's city. The 36 leader cards are based on real historical figures or legends: Amytis, Alexander, Archimedes, Aristotle, Bilkis, Caesar, Cleopatra, Croesus, Euclid, Hammurabi, Hannibal, Hatshepsut, Hiram, Hypatia, Imhotep, Justinian, Leonidas, Maecenas, Midas, Nebuchadnezzar, Nefertiti, Nero, Pericles, Phidias, Plato, Praxiteles, Ptolemy, Pythagoras, Ramesses, Sappho, Solomon, Tomyris, Varro, Vitruvius, Xenophon, and Zenobia. A brief biography of each leader is featured in the rulebook.

Playing with the Leaders expansion changes the game mechanic, as the second thing done in the game after choosing a Wonder board is to choose leaders. Four leader cards are dealt to each player, and the cards are drafted. At the start of each Age, players may recruit one leader, paying its coin cost and putting it into play. To compensate for this extra expense, with the Leaders expansion, players start with six coins instead of three. As with the Age cards, instead of recruiting a leader, a player may choose to discard the card to gain three coins or build a Wonder stage with it.

The leaders grant various abilities, including additional means of gaining victory points, resources, or coins, resource cost reductions, commerce benefits, additional shields, and scientific symbols. For example, the "Caesar" card grants two shields and "Midas" grants one extra victory point per three coins held at the end of the game.

The expansion comes with four additional guild cards and one extra Wonder board – the Colosseum of Rome, which grants abilities related to the new leader cards.

=== 7 Wonders: Cities (August 2012) ===
The Cities expansion introduces nine city cards (with a black background) to each of the Age card decks. The number of city cards that are shuffled into each age's deck is equal to the number of players. This means that each age now consists of seven play of cards.

The city cards can have quite an impact on gameplay, as many of them are more powerful but expensive versions of existing cards; for example, the Age III "Contingent" card provides five shields as opposed to the three provided by Age III red cards. The cards also introduce some new concepts such as diplomacy, which allows a player to avoid military conflict for one Age, and monetary loss, which forces the player's opponents to either pay coins to the bank or lose victory points if they cannot or will not pay.

The addition of city cards takes the total number of cards playable in each age to 56. This means that eight-player games – or team games with four teams of two – are possible. In the team game, partners are allowed to see each other's cards and discuss which ones to play, and the effect of diplomacy is modified.

The Cities expansion also contains three new guild cards, six leader cards (Aspasia, Berenice, Caligula, Darius, Diocletian, Semiramis), and two Wonder boards (the Hagia Sophia of Byzantium and Al Khazneh of Petra). Many of these new additions have abilities specific to city cards or to the new concepts introduced.

=== 7 Wonders: Wonder Pack (May 2013) ===
This expansion adds four Wonder boards: Abu Simbel, the Great Wall of China, Stonehenge, and Manneken Pis of Brussels (the hometown of the game's creators).

=== 7 Wonders: Babel (December 2014) ===
Babel consists of two expansions that can be added separately or together. The first expansion is Tower of Babel, in which players can choose to construct the tower. By discarding a card, players can place a tile on the tower that affects play (for example, taxing the construction of Wonders or granting a monetary bonus for building certain cards) until it is covered by a subsequent tile. Players score points for the number of tiles they play. The second expansion is Great Projects of Babel. A building of a certain color is put into play. Whenever a player plays a card of the same color, they may choose to pay a cost to participate in the building of the Great Project. If the project succeeds, all players who participated get a reward, and non-participants get nothing. If the project fails, participants get nothing and non-participants receive a penalty.

=== 7 Wonders: Leaders Anniversary Pack & Cities Anniversary Pack (2017) ===
These expansions add new Leaders cards and new Cities cards, with new effects. The new Leaders are prominent women of mythology and ancient history: Aganice, Agrippina, Arsinoe, Cornelia, Cynisca, Enheduanna, Eurypyle, Gorgo, Makeda, Nitocris, Octavia, Phryne, Roxana, Telesilla, and Theano.

=== 7 Wonders: Armada (October 2018) ===
Armada adds a naval board for each player and four ships: red, blue, yellow, and green. When playing a card of one of these colors, players may pay an additional cost to advance the corresponding ship along the board. Advancing each ship grants different bonuses: the red ship grants naval strength, which is compared to all players at the end of the Age, not just neighbors; the yellow ship grants money; the blue ship grants victory points; and the green ship allows players to discover islands, which grant extra bonuses.

=== 7 Wonders Second Edition (2020) ===
The second edition of 7 Wonders was released in 2020. The graphics, wonders in the base game, and cards cost and chains were slightly modified. Most notably in the base game, the Strategists' Guild was replaced by the Decorator's Guild, which grants 7 points if all of a player's wonder steps are built by the end of the game. Olympia and Babylon received the biggest changes in terms of abilities. Leaders, Cities, and Armada also received changes in the second edition in terms of graphics and abilities.

== Spin-offs ==
=== 7 Wonders: Duel (October 2015) ===
7 Wonders: Duel is a two player version of 7 Wonders, designed by Antoine Bauza and Bruno Cathala, in which players alternate drafting from an overlapping pyramid of cards. A version of the game for iOS and Android was released by Repos Digital in 2019. An Ars Technica review stated that "[the] game's three win conditions—civilian, scientific, and military—ensure that you're always juggling several plates, and the whole thing plays like a lightning-quick, board-less match of Civilization". The game also appeared on a The New York Times list, with the reviewers praising its multiple ways of victory, the game arc, complexity, replayability, and strategy, but was criticised for its difficult learning curve. Dicebreaker also considered it to be one of the best card drafting games. IGN considered it to be superior to the original, and was complimentary to the new draft system. In 2020, Repos Production released a print-and-play mini expansion, 7 Wonders Duel: Solo, the first solo boarding experience in the 7 Wonders series.

=== 7 Wonders: Duel – Pantheon (October 2016) ===
The expansion to 7 Wonders: Duel added new abilities to the game via a rotating pantheon of gods, as well as two new wonders.

=== 7 Wonders: Duel – Agora (January 2021) ===
Adds a Senate with new play mechanics based on new senator and "conspirator" cards. The expansion includes two new tokens and two new Wonders based on this while introducing a new "political victory".

=== 7 Wonders: Duel – promotional wonders ===
- Messe Essen (2015)
- Statue of Liberty (2016)
- Stonehenge (2017)
- Sagrada Familia (2018)

=== 7 Wonders: Architects (2021) ===
A whole new game based on multiple decks and wonders of different bits and pieces which the players construct. The publishers stated that it was more family-friendly than its predecessor but still deep enough for "gamers" to enjoy. The game was recommended for the 2022 Spiel des Jahres.

=== 7 Wonders: Architects – Medals (2024) ===
An expansion to 7 Wonders: Architects. First, this expansion includes two new wonders – Ur and Rome – to give players more choices for what to build.

Second, new science tokens exist that can be mixed with the original ones, tokens that give you the ability to, for example, keep military cards that you would normally discard or always have the cat ability available to you.

Finally, this expansion includes a new game element: medals.

=== The Lord of the Rings: Duel for Middle-earth (2024) ===
A whole new game re-implementing 7 Wonders Duel with a Lord of the Rings theme. The military track is replaced by a Quest of the ring track, and the research tokens are replaced by "race support" tokens. The game also adds a map on which players compete for control.

== Reception ==
7 Wonders has been cited as the most awarded board game in the world and has sold over 2 million copies across the world. The game is highly regarded, and has won more than 30 gaming awards, including the inaugural Kennerspiel des Jahres connoisseurs' award in June 2011. The game also won the Deutscher Spiele Preis, a well known award for board games decided by votes from shops, magazines and gaming clubs in Germany. It also won the International Gamers Award for the Best Multiplayer Strategy Game of 2011. The game has been cited by leading designers as one of the most influential board games of the last decade, with Polygon praising its originality. It was also the winner of the 2011 Vuoden Aikuistenpeli (Finland) for Adult game of the year.

== See also ==
- Takenoko (board game)
- Terror in Meeple City

| Preceded by none | Kennerspiel des Jahres; 2011 | Succeeded by Village |
