= Antoine Bauza =

French game designer

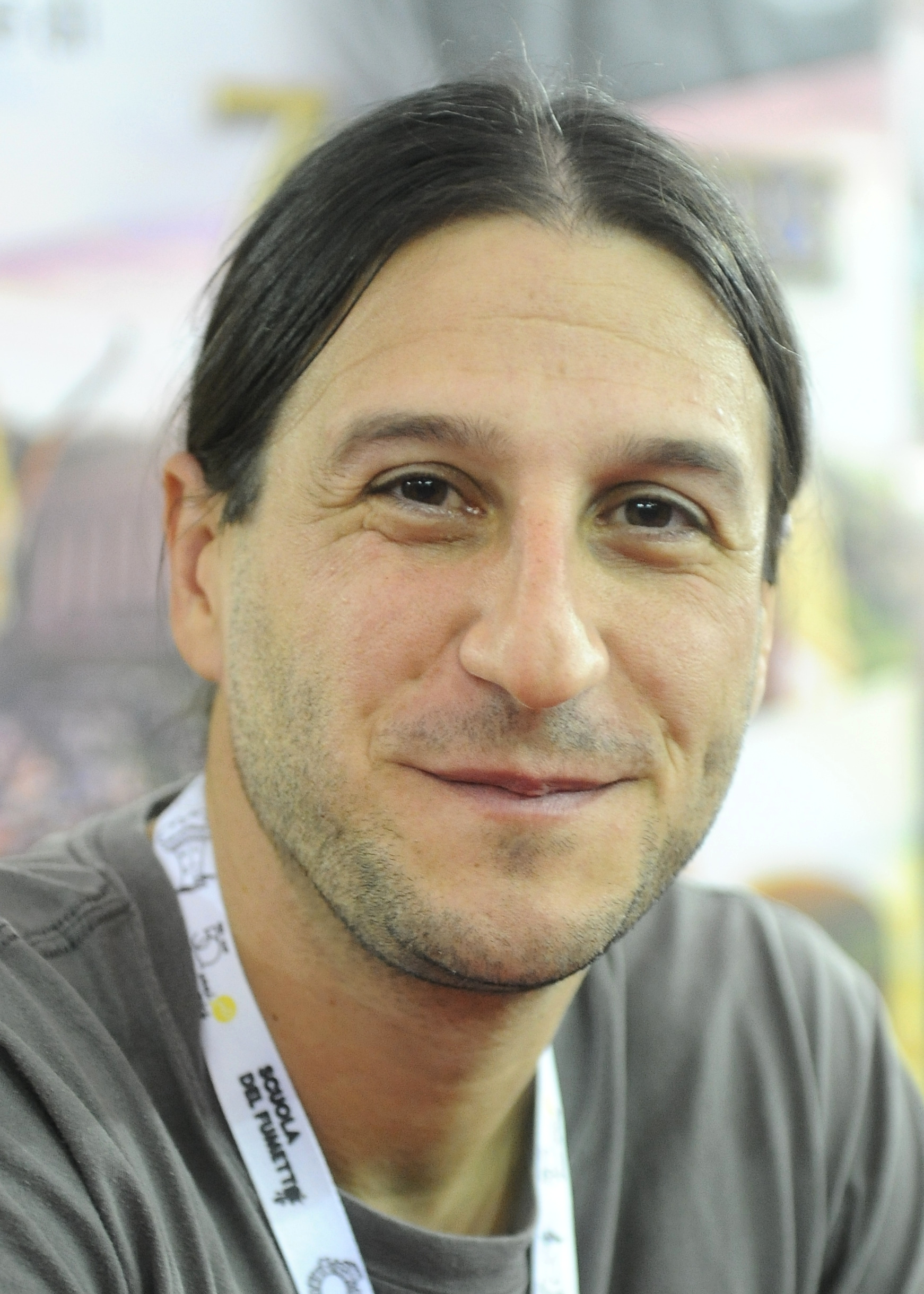
- Bauza at the Lucca Comics & Games convention in 2016.
- Occupation: game designer
- Years active: 2007–present
- Known for: Board game creation
- Notable work: Hanabi, 7 Wonders, Takenoko
- Awards: Kennerspiel des Jahres (7 Wonders, 2011), Spiel des Jahres (Hanabi, 2013)

Antoine Bauza (born 25 August 1978) is a French game designer. He designs board games, role-playing games and video games as well as being an author of children's books.

== Life and career ==
Bauza was born on 25 August 1978. As a teenager, he was very interested in role-playing games, and wanted to become a video game designer. However, Bauza decided not to pursue video games as a career because he did not want to move away to Shanghai or Montreal, where video game companies were hiring at the time. He instead decided to become a teacher. After reconnecting with friends who started to hold their own game nights, Bauza began making his first board game prototypes in 2003 during his free time while studying at the Institut Universitaire de Formation des Maîtres.

An avid board game player, Bauza decided to start making board games in 2007. In 2010, he began working on board games full-time.

In January 2025, his game 7 Wonders was incorporated as one of twenty-five games into the BoardGameGeek Hall of Fame

== Board games ==
- 7 Wonders
- 7 Wonders Duel
- Ali
- Bakong
- Chabyrinthe
- Dojo
- Dr. Shark
- Draftosaurus
- Ghost Stories
- Hanabi
- Hurry’Cup
- Last Bastion
- The Little Prince: Make Me a Planet
- Monster Chase!
- Mystery Express
- Namiji
- Pocket Rockets
- Pony Express
- Rockband Manager
- Samurai Spirit
- Takenoko
- Terror in Meeple City
- Tokaido
- Victorian Masterminds
- Welcome back to the dungeon
- Witty Pong

== Role-playing games ==
- Exil
- Final Frontier
- Little Wizards

== Video games ==
- Furry Tales
- World of Lovecraft

== Awards ==
- Meeples' Choice Award (2010) for 7 Wonders
- Deutscher Spiele Preis (2011) for 7 Wonders
- Kennerspiel des Jahres (2011) for 7 Wonders
- As d'or Jeu de l'année (2012) for Takenoko
- Spiel des Jahres (2013) for Hanabi
- Fairplay À la carte Award (2013) for Hanabi
