= Terror in Meeple City =

Board game

Terror in Meeple City (Formerly Rampage) is a board game created by Ludovic Maublanc & Antoine Bauza and published by Repos Production. The game play involves using physical actions and various wooden game pieces to knock over buildings represented by cardboard tiles and held up by meeple figures.

== Setting ==
The game's setting is Meeple City, represented by a physical game board on which are built several "buildings" constructed out of cardboard "floors" and held up by wooden meeple figures. The city is under attack by giant lizard-like monsters controlled by the players, whose goal is to demolish the buildings and eat the meeples which are knocked free by doing so.

== Gameplay ==
The monsters themselves, as well as the meeples and tokens representing vehicles, are constructed from wood and are heavier than typical game pieces. Various physical actions are executed by the players using these pieces in an attempt to demolish the city. These include dropping the wooden pieces onto the buildings or other players' figures, as well as launching a "breath attack" by physically blowing on the game board from the location of the monster.

== In popular culture ==
In April 2014, the game, played under its original name of Rampage, was featured on a live stream hosted by Wil Wheaton as part of an International TableTop Day event.

== Name change ==
The game was originally released in 2013 with the title Rampage and it shares many stylistic elements with the arcade game of the same name, despite not being a licensed product. In June 2014, Repos officially changed the name of the game to Terror in Meeple City.

== See also ==
- Hanabi (card game)
- 7 Wonders (board game)
- Takenoko (board game)
