= 30 Seconds (game) =

Board game

- Publishers: Calco Games; Woodland Games Limited (Ireland)
- Players: Min 3, max 16
- Playing time: 1 hour
- Chance: Medium
- Age range: 15 and up, though there is a junior version
- Skills: Dice rolling, General Knowledge/Trivia, Team play

30 Seconds is a charades-like fast-paced general knowledge board game, created by Calie Esterhuyse and first published in South Africa in 1998.

The game is played with two or more teams of at least two players. Each round one player picks a card and has 30 seconds to describe the five objects, people or places written on the card without revealing the card or saying any part of the name.

The aim is for their teammates to guess as many correct words on the card as they can within the time limit for the chance to move their team's token towards the finish line.

The 2400 words across 240 cards need to be regularly updated to remove aged references.

The game has international acclaim and has been translated into several other languages; and is now available for sale in the Netherlands, Germany, Australia, England, France, the USA and Ireland. The popularity has grown to create a junior version too.

== Objective ==
The overall objective of the game is for each team to be the first to move their token from start to finish around the board, along a track of 35 alternating blue and yellow squares with decorative general-knowledge-inspired pictures.

Teams advance by correctly identifying the words their teammate is describing each round.

== Gameplay ==
The players divide into teams. Each team selects a token and places it on the START square.

At the start of each round, the team throws a special 30 Seconds die to determine a handicap. The die has six sides with values of 0, 1 or 2. This handicap will be subtracted from the number of correct guesses during that turn to determine how many squares their token may advance, therefore 0 is preferable.

Now the team decides on a describer for the turn, while the rest of the team will be identifiers. All players must take their turn at being both describers and identifiers. The describer within a team must rotate with each turn.

The describer draws a card from the "OUT" side of the card box without looking at the words before the timer begins. Each card has a yellow side and a blue side and the player will read from the side that corresponds with the colour square their token is on. There are five words printed on each card side.

The opposing team then turns over the 30-second timer to begin the describing and guessing. The describer may describe the five words in any order and in any way they wish, including singing, humming and gesticulating. They may not say the actual words on the card (not including 'and' etc), words derived from the words on the card (fishing if the word is fish), say what letters it begins with, what it sounds like or rhymes with, use translations or point to anything.

The identifiers shout out their guesses as the describer is describing and it is the opposing team's responsibility to keep an eye on the timer and shout "stop" once it has run out.

Finally, the team determines how many squares they move forward by taking the number of correct answers and subtracting the handicap. If the handicap is higher than the correct guesses, the team does not move backwards.

The team returns their used card to the "IN" side of the card box and it is the next team's turn.

The first team to reach the FINISH square is the winner.

== Clues ==
Clues are generally short with a strong emphasis on synonyms and associations. For example, if the answer is "Gauteng" the clue might be as simple as, "The province in which Johannesburg is found".

The official rules regarding clues are restrictive and provision is made for penalties (moving backwards). In most circumstances house rules are more relaxed to increase the speed and enjoyment of the game.

== Invention ==
30 Seconds was created by Calie Esterhuyse but its origin seems to be collaborative.

In 1996, while on holiday in Gordon’s Bay, tennis player Marius Barnard came up with a game for the 20 people present. Each person had to write a name on a piece of paper and place it in a bowl. The papers were shuffled and guests were paired as partners. They were asked to pull a piece of paper and had 40 seconds to describe it to their teammate.

The game was played again a year later at a beach house at Great Brak River where Esterhuyse was present – and this sparked the idea of creating an exciting board game with a similar process.

‘We wrote down famous names on pieces of paper and each of us had to explain who the person was without mentioning the name. We enjoyed it so much that we played it again and again.’

Esterhuyse had already developed another game called Goldquest, which had been available since 1993. This experience helped him to develop 30 Seconds. It took an entire year to research the facts to include in the game.

The first name considered for 30 Seconds was "Rudi Nappy", which happened to be the name pulled out of the bowl by rugby player Schalk Burger at the party hosted at Great Brak River. It was also the name of an artist who created the placemats at the party. The name didn’t stick and just before it was ready to be released in 1998 it was changed to 30 Seconds.

Explaining that a game needs to be exceptional to succeed in the small South African game market, Esterhuyse said, ‘It also has to have an element of fun. South Africans like games that are uncomplicated and don’t take ages to explain. In Northern Europe and Scandinavia it is quite the opposite – complicated and strategic games are a big part of their culture.’

== Irish edition ==
The first Irish edition of 30 Seconds was launched in December 2010.

The idea for an Irish version of 30 Seconds occurred during a phone call between two Irish friends, Greg Dooley and Liam Ryan. Under the company name of Woodland Games, the pair, alongside the original inventor of the game, Calie Esterhuyse, carried out extensive market research before releasing the game in 2010. Dooley, a former teacher from Cork, is the de facto editor of the Irish edition, going through all 2,400 words to see what needs to be updated or localised. He believes that the popularity of the game comes from its broad appeal "across general knowledge, sports, politics, pop culture, celebrities".

Grassroots marketing on local radio and getting stocked by independent shops as well as Smyths and Toymaster’s saw the selling of 1,500 games in 2011 and gradually sales grew to 3,000 in year three and 5,000 by 2014. After five years 20,000 games had been sold and the company had ramped up its promotion and PR considerably.

In May 2020, during the first coronavirus lockdown, stock that was meant to last until October completely sold out in retailers across Ireland. More than 30,000 units sold in 2020.
