= Bulleribock =

Swedish guessing game

Bulleribock or bulleri bock is a Swedish children's guessing game for two people.

The game is played as follows: person A turns his back to person B, who taps both hands rhythmically on A's back while saying a rhythmic, rhymed chant: Bulleri, bulleri bock, hur många horn står opp? (lit. "Bulleri, bulleri billy goat, how many horns stand up?"). B then stops drumming, but keeps some of his fingertips on A's back. A then guesses how many fingers are pressed against his back. B responds with a chant corresponding to the right or the wrong answer, and the persons switch roles.

Bulleribock was described in Nordlander (1886), where a number of slightly different varieties of the chant from different parts of Sweden and Swedish-speaking Finland were attested. It is still a popular game among young children in Sweden.

== See also ==
- Two-point discrimination
