= Catch Phrase (game) =

Board game

Catchphrase
- Other names: Pass Word
- Designers: Craig Williamson
- Publishers: Hasbro
- Publication: 1994; 32 years ago
- Years active: 1994–?
- Genres: Party game
- Languages: English
- Players: 4–16
- Playing time: 30 minutes
- Age range: 12+
- Skills: Guessing

Catch Phrase is a word guessing party game commercially available from Hasbro.

The game is played one word at a time. Later, stand-alone electronic devices with built-in random lists of word phrases were made available.

== Game play ==
The game is played in two teams. The goal for each player is to get their team to say the word or word phrase displayed in the disc. One member of a team starts the timer and tries to get their team to guess the displayed word or phrase. A clue-giver can make any physical gesture, and can give almost any verbal clue, but may not say a word that rhymes with any of the words, give the first letter of a word, say the number of syllables, or say part of any word in the clue (e.g., "worry" for "worry wart"). When the team guesses correctly, the other team takes its turn. Play continues until the timer runs out. The team not holding the disc when time runs out scores a point. They also have one chance to guess the word or phrase, with team members allowed to confer; a correct answer earns a bonus point. The first team to score 7 points wins.

=== Dispute resolution ===
If the timer runs out during the passing of the game unit before being fully in possession of the hands of the receiver, the passer is deemed still holding the unit.

A "tie" judgement is awarded in favor of the receiver

If the passer or receiver challenges a point, the oldest player in the game who is not the passer or receiver resolves the dispute.

== Original version ==
The older version of the game contains discs with 72 words on each side. The word list is advanced by pressing a button on the right side of the disc apparatus. A timer beeps at an increasing rate before randomly buzzing, signalling the end of turn. A scoring sheet is provided.

== Electronic versions ==
A later version, also known as Electronic Catch Phrase, is an electronic game (a device similar in appearance to the original version) with integrated phrase list, timer, and scoring. The game unit has a LCD screen to display the words and buttons to start the timer, advance play, and assign points to teams. Teams must guess the entire phrase as displayed.

A second edition of the electronic game with a changed appearance has a backlit LCD screen and a visual score display rather than the auditory score system.

== Word list ==
The electronic's version's word list contains 10,000 words, which are categorized:

- "Everything" – all 10,000 words in the game
- "Tech/Inventions" – Anything that has been invented through the ages, from ancient history to modern times
- "History Buff" – History, politics, wars, civics, and things in the present that will become history
- "Entertainment" – Movies, music, books, actors, singers, authors, as well as fun activities
- "Sports/Games" – Sports and games of all sorts, leisure activities
- "Geography" – Places, both geographically and answers to the question "where?"; Also things that are usually found in a particular place or region
- "Transportation" – Methods of transport, as well as things seen while travelling
- "Around the House" – Household items
- "Food/Drink" – Foods and drinks, cooking terms, ingredients, restaurants, other food items
- "Plants/Animals" – Plants, animals, items made from plants or animals
- "Family" – A subset of the words appropriate for children, no adult themes or terms

== Variations ==
Advanced players and teams tend to forgo the game board. Instead, one person is assigned as the score keeper and tallies the points along the way.

=== Elimination Variation ===
A fast-paced variation for large groups is to have multiple teams and play elimination style. Players split up into teams of two and are arranged in a circle, with teammates facing each other.

- The team starting the round will pick a category and announce it to the group. Play starts as soon as the timer is started. The player must then get their teammate to correctly say the phrase by following the rules of normal play regarding clue-giving.
- If a team guesses the phrase correctly, the device is passed to the player to the left as quickly as possible, without restarting the timer, and no point is scored.
- If a team has the device when the buzzer sounds, the round is over and their team scores a point.
- An answer that has started before but ends after the buzzer sounds (buzzer beaters) will count as long as it is correct.
- If the buzzer sounds during a pass, neither team scores a point. A pass occurs from the time one team gets the phrase correct until the second team begins giving a clue.
- When a team scores a certain number of points they are eliminated from play, and play continues until only one team is left. The number of points required to eliminate a team from play can vary depending on the size of the group. For instance, larger groups may find that the game moves faster if they play single elimination.

Since teams are often passed the device with little time left they are forced to try to guess the phrase as quickly as possible as each point they earn moves them closer to elimination. This adds a frenetic pace to the game (especially when the timer starts ticking fast and you know you only have seconds left) and things can get exciting very quickly. To make things a little easier, each team may be allowed to skip one phrase per turn if they think it is too hard to describe in the time available. Each time the timer runs out, the team left holding the device can change the category if they so desire and must announce the new category to the group before starting the next round. The category cannot be changed once the timer has started.

It is considered good sportsmanship for the passing team to skip to the next phrase before passing the device as quickly as possible to the next team, and to start giving clues as soon as possible after receiving the device. If a player waits an unreasonable amount of time (decided by the group as a whole each time an infraction occurs) before passing the device, or before beginning to give clues after receiving the device, that player's team will receive a point and the round ends.

The game is similar to Taboo, also from Hasbro, in which a player tries to get their teammates to guess words without using the word in question or five related words.
