= Time's Up! (game) =

1999 board game

Time's Up
- Publishers: R&R Games, Inc.
- Publication: 2008
- Genres: Charades, Party
- Languages: English
- Players: 4 or more, played in teams
- Setup time: 2 minutes
- Playing time: 60 minutes
- Chance: Little
- Age range: 7 and up
- Skills: General knowledge, memory, acting
- Website: Official Site

Time's Up is a charades-based party game designed by Peter Sarrett, and published by R&R Games, Inc., a Tampa, Florida–based manufacturer of tabletop games and party games. The first edition of the game was published in 1999, with the most recent edition, Time's Up! Deluxe, published in 2008. It is a game for teams of two or more players, and is played in three rounds. Time's Up! is based on the classic parlour game known as Celebrity.

== Gameplay ==
The game is played using a set of 40 randomly chosen name cards, known as the Deck of Fame. The Deck of Fame is used throughout all three rounds of the game. Each team gets 30 seconds to guess as many names as possible, with one player giving clues to his teammates. Players use words, sound effects and charades as they give their clues, but speech becomes more restricted as the game progresses in rounds 2 and 3. On each team's turn, one member of the team is the Cluegiver and the rest are the Guessers.

- In round 1, the Cluegiver draws a name card and begins giving clues to his teammates (Guessers). Almost anything is allowed for cluegiving, but passing is not allowed. The Cluegiver can sing, hum, point, charade, give full descriptions of the person, etc. The round ends when all names have been guessed.
- In round 2, the Cluegiver may give only one word for each clue, which may be repeated as often as desired. Once the word is said, only non-verbal clues (sound effects, charades) may be given. Teammates get one guess only, and passing is allowed.
- In round 3, the Cluegiver may not use any words at all. Only sounds and charades may be used for each clue. Teammates get one guess only and passing is allowed.

For advanced play, there is an optional round 4 in Time's Up!, where the Guesser starts with their eyes closed while the Cluegiver freezes in a pose depicting their clue. Once frozen, the Guesser opens their eyes and must give one guess. The Cluegiver looks at the next card and repeats the process.

== Versions ==
Two expansions for Time's Up were published by R&R Games in 2001 and 2002, adding new cards. In 2008, Time's Up Deluxe was published, which combined the best cards from the base game and those two expansions with a number of new cards. Also in 2008, Time's Up: Title Recall was published. This version of the game challenges players to guess the titles of books, films, songs, etc., using the same basic rules.

== Reception ==
Time's Up has been named Best Party Game by the Chicago Tribune, San Francisco Chronicle, and Games magazine, and has won over 15 awards, including the Mensa Select award.

== Reviews ==
- Family Games: The 100 Best
