= Charades =

Word guessing game

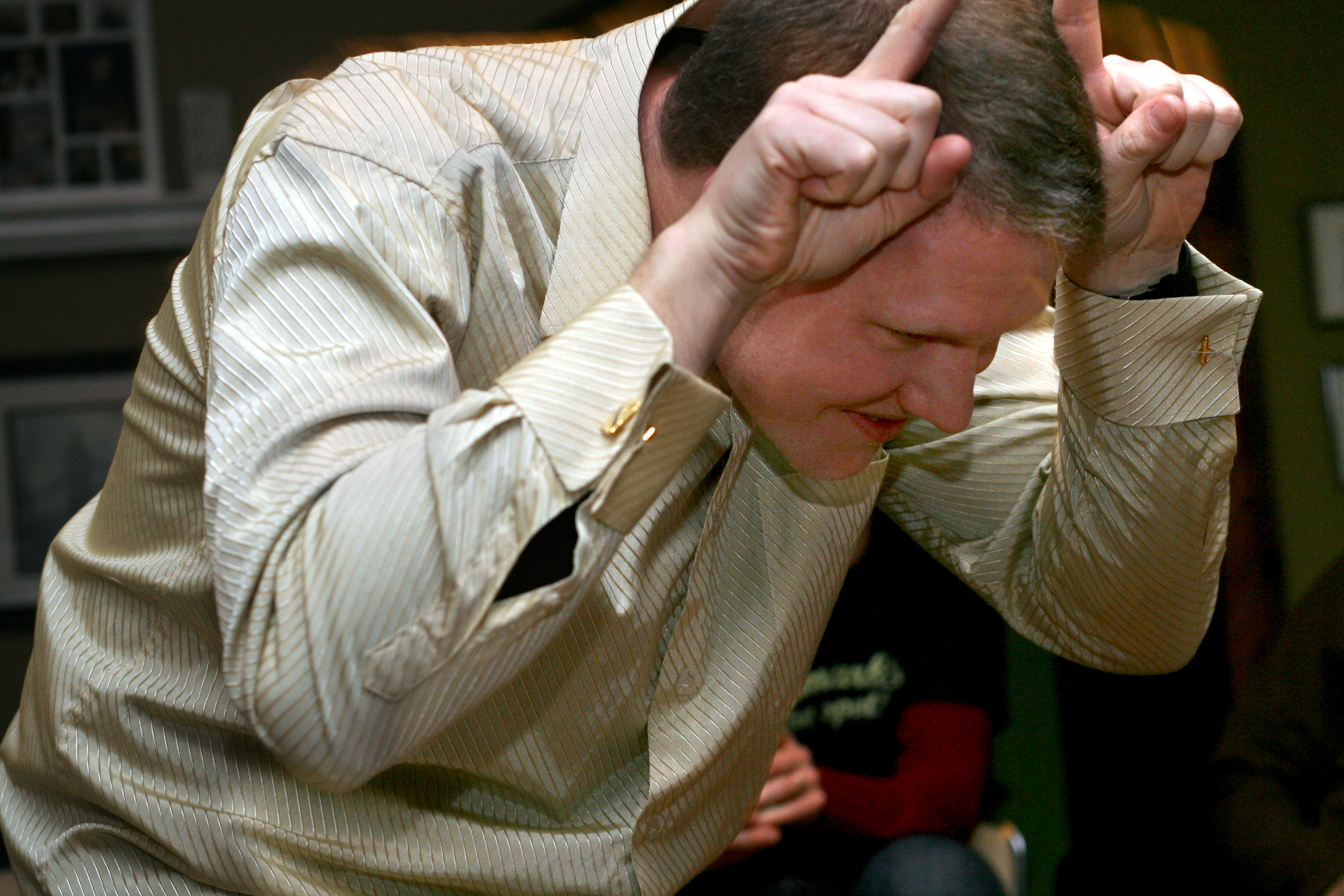
Man trying to act out a word in the game of charades

Charades (UK: /ʃəˈrɑːdz/, US: /ʃəˈreɪdz/) is a parlor or party word guessing game. Originally, the game was a dramatic form of literary charades: a single person would act out each syllable of a word or phrase in order, followed by the whole phrase together, while the rest of the group guessed. A variant was to have teams who acted scenes out together while the others guessed. Today, it is common to require the actors to mime their hints without using any spoken words, which requires some conventional gestures. Puns and visual puns were and remain common.

== History ==
=== Literary charades ===
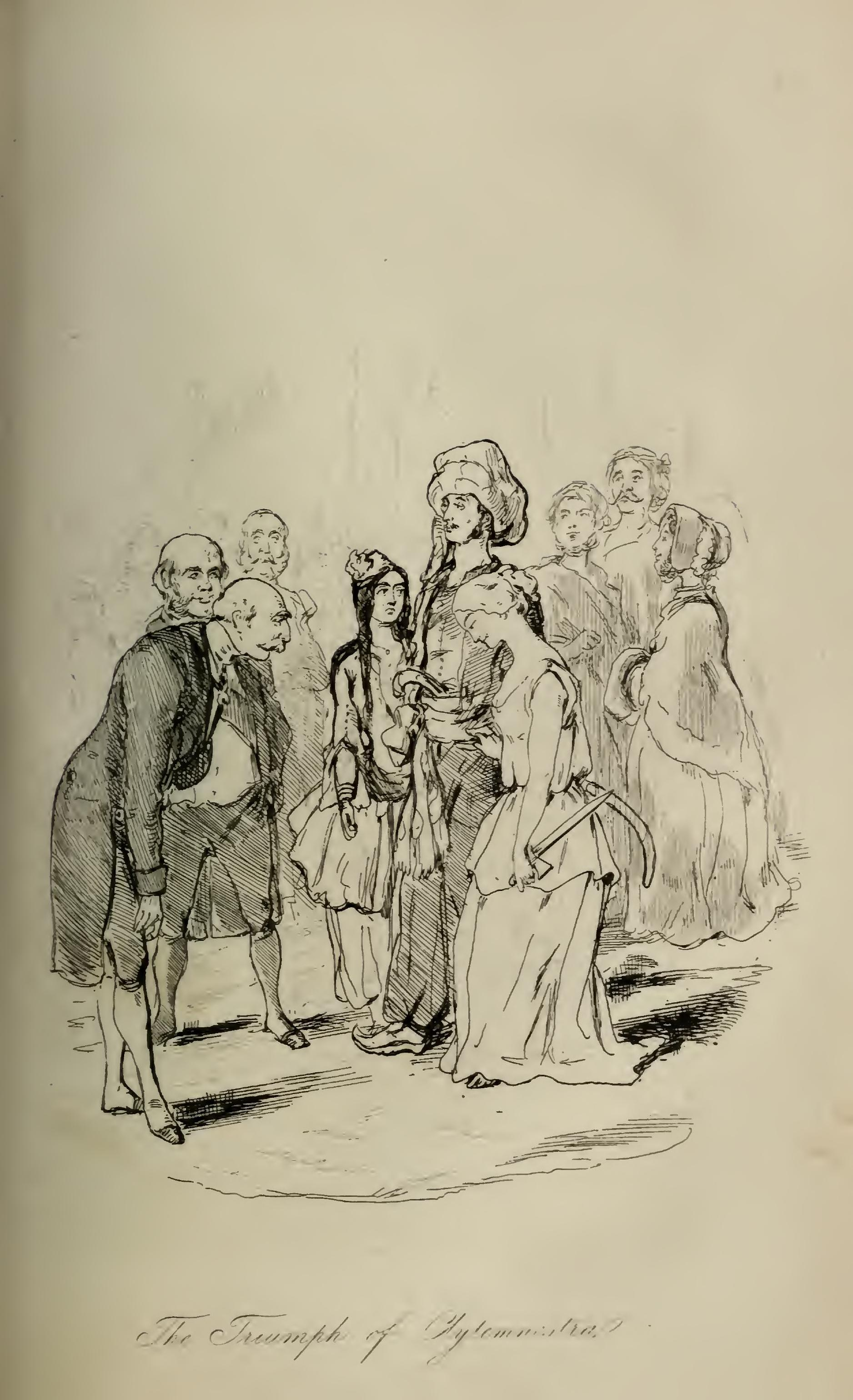
The Triumph of Clytemnestra

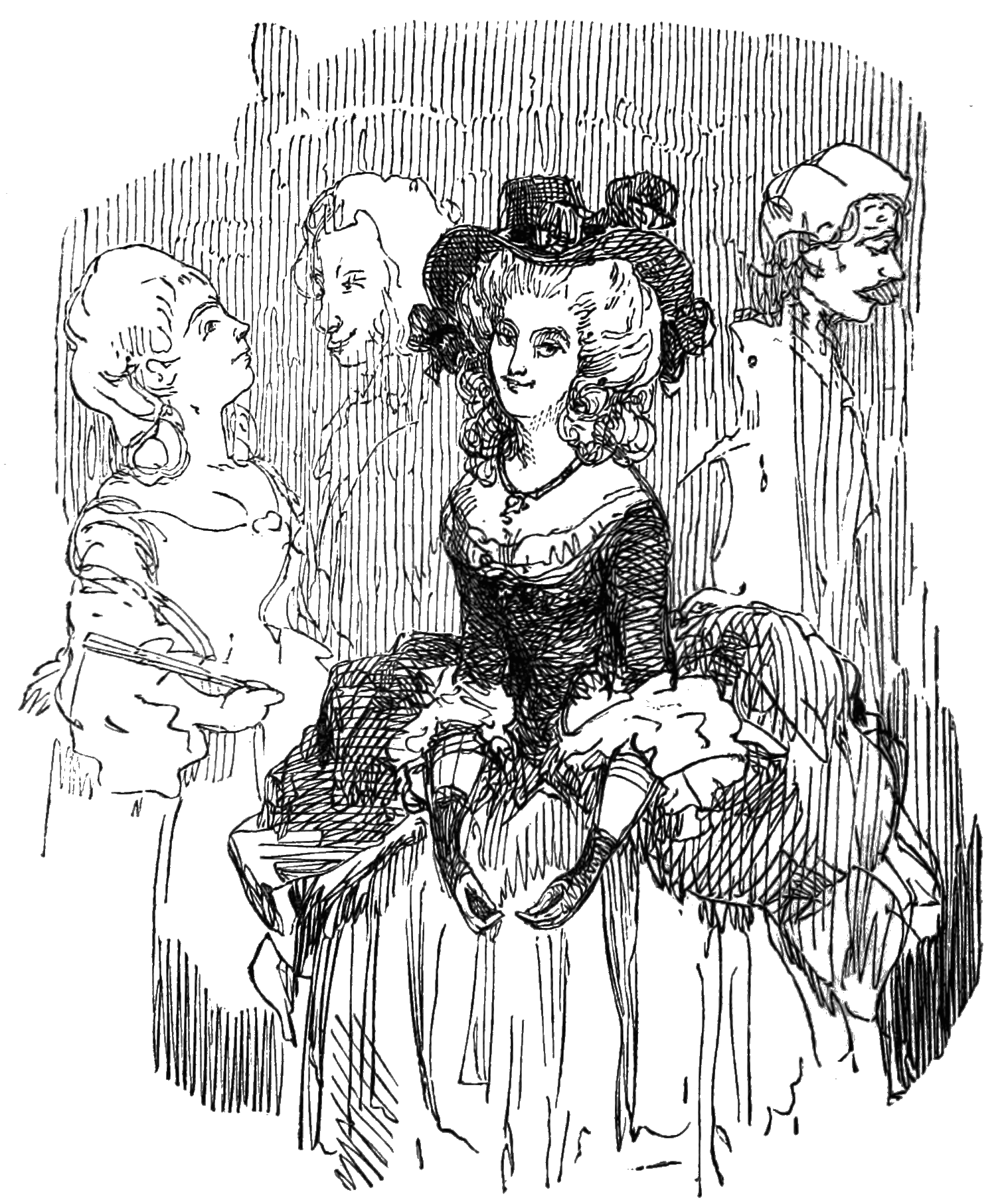
Becky as a Louis-Quatorze Philomela

A charade was a form of literary riddle popularized in France in the 18th century where each syllable of the answer was described enigmatically as a separate word before the word as a whole was similarly described. The term charade was borrowed into English from French in the second half of the eighteenth century, denoting a "kind of riddle in which each syllable of a word, or a complete word or phrase, is enigmatically described or dramatically represented".

Written forms of charade appeared in magazines and books, and on the folding fans of the Regency. The answers were sometimes printed on the reverse of the fan, suggesting that they were a flirting device, used by a young woman to tease her beau. One charade composed by Jane Austen goes as follows:

When my first is a task to a young girl of spirit,
And my second confines her to finish the piece,
How hard is her fate! but how great is her merit
If by taking my whole she effects her release!

The answer is "hem-lock".

William Mackworth Praed's poetic charades became famous.

Later examples omitted direct references to individual syllables, such as the following, said to be a favorite of Theodore Roosevelt:

I talk, but I do not speak my mind
I hear words, but I do not listen to thoughts
When I wake, all see me
When I sleep, all hear me
Many heads are on my shoulders
Many hands are at my feet
The strongest steel cannot break my visage
But the softest whisper can destroy me
The quietest whimper can be heard.

The answer is "an actor".

In the early 20th century, the 11th edition of the Encyclopædia Britannica offered these two prose charades as "perhaps as good as could be selected":

"My first, with the most rooted antipathy to a Frenchman, prides himself, whenever they meet, upon sticking close to his jacket; my second has many virtues, nor is its least that it gives its name to my first; my whole may I never catch!"

and

"My first is company; my second shuns company; my third collects company; and my whole amuses company."

with the answers being tartar and conundrum.

=== Acted charades ===
In the early 19th century, the French began performing "acting" or "acted charades"—with the written description replaced by dramatic performances as a parlor game—and this was brought over to Britain by the English aristocracy. Thus the term gradually became more popularly used to refer to acted charades, examples of which are described in William Thackeray's Vanity Fair and in Charlotte Brontë's Jane Eyre.

Thackeray snarked that charades were enjoyed for "enabling the many ladies amongst us who had beauty to display their charms, and the fewer number who had cleverness, to exhibit their wit". In his Vanity Fair, the height of Rebecca Sharp's social success is brought on by her performances of acting charades before the Prince Regent. The first scene—"first two syllables"—displays a Turkish lord dealing with a slaver and his odalisque before being garroted by the sultan's chief black eunuch; the second—"last two syllables"—finds a Turk, his consort, and his black slave praying at sunrise when an enormous Egyptian head enters and begins singing. The answer—Agamemnon—is then acted out by Becky's husband, while she makes her (first) appearance as Clytemnestra. After refreshments, another round begins, partially in pantomime: the first scene shows a household yawningly finishing a game of cribbage and preparing for bed; the second opens on the household bustling with activity as daybreak prompts bells ringing, arguments over receipts, collection of the chamber pots, calls for carriages, and greetings to new guests; the third closes with a ship's crew and passengers tossed about by a storm with strong winds. The answer—nightingale—is then (somewhat mistakenly) (Note: In Greek and Roman accounts of the story, it is Procne and not Philomela who becomes the nightingale. A mistaken etymology and Ovid's ambiguity on the point seem responsible for having confused the two sisters.) acted out by Becky in the role of a singing French marquise, recalling both Lacoste's 1705 tragic opera Philomèle and an arriviste lover and wife of Louis XIV. Apart from its importance in the book, the scenes were subsequently considered models of the genre.

By the time of the First World War, "acting charades" had become the most popular form and, as written charades were forgotten, it adopted its present, terser name. Thackeray's scenes—even those said to be "in pantomime"—included dialogue from the actors but truly "dumb" or "mime charades" gradually became more popular as well and similarly dropped their descriptive adjectives. The amateurish acting involved in charades led to the word's use to describe any obvious or inept deception, but over time "a charade" became used more broadly for any put-on (even highly competent and successful ones) and its original association with the parlor game has largely been lost.

The acted form of charades has been repeatedly made into television game shows, including the American Play the Game, Movietown, RSVP, Pantomime Quiz, Stump the Stars, Celebrity Charades, Showoffs and Body Language; the British Give Us a Clue; the Canadian Party Game and Acting Crazy; and the Australian Celebrity Game. On Britain's BBC Radio 4, I'm Sorry I Haven't a Clue performs a variant of the old written and spoken form of the game as Sound Charades.

In the 1939 movie The Mystery of Mr. Wong, the game is called "Indications".

== Rules ==
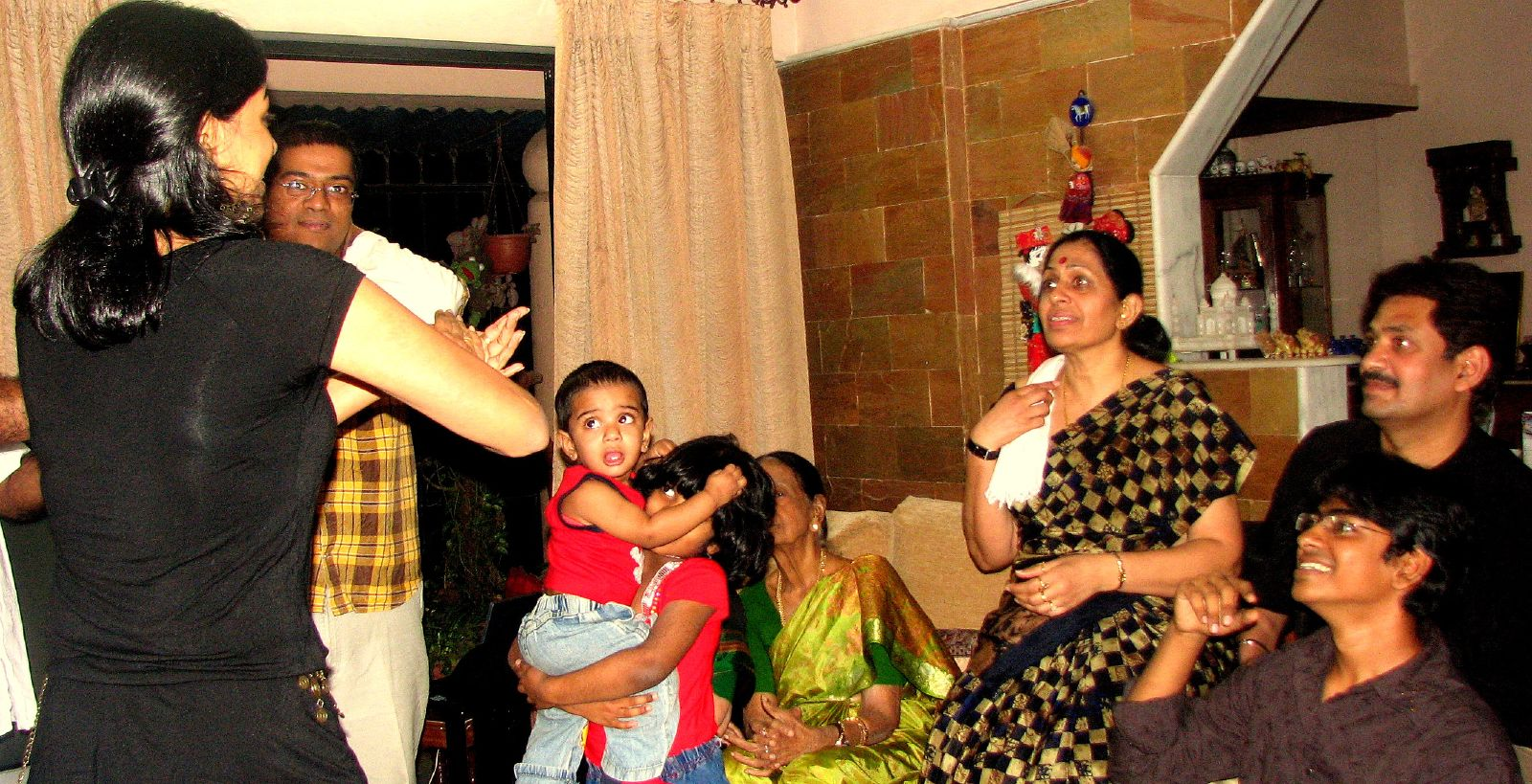
Group guessing the acted-out phrase in the game of charades.

As a long-lived and informal game, charades' rules can vary widely. Common features of the game include holding up a number of fingers to indicate the number of syllables in the answer, silently replying to questions, and making a "come on" gesture once the guesses become close; some forms of the games, however, forbid anything except physically acting out the answer. In a mixed setting, it is therefore advisable to clarify the rules before play begins.

Common features of the modern game include:

- Players are not allowed to play people or actors etc.
- Players divided into two or more exclusive teams.
- A notebook or scraps of paper, used for one team to write the answer(s) to be performed by a member of the other side. The answer(s) may be restricted to dictionary words, titles of artistic works, etc. to limit the difficulty. Words which cannot be explained other than by spelling (e.g., the or of) may be excluded from play except within larger phrases.
- A silent performance by the player to his or her teammates. To enforce a focus on physical acting out of the clues, silent mouthing of the words for lipreading, spelling, and pointing are generally banned. Humming, clapping, and other noises may be banned as well.
- A clock, timer, hourglass, etc. to limit the teams' guesses.
- A scoreboard or sheet to tally the teams' points: one for every correctly guessed answer and one for every answer the opposing team failed to guess within the allotted time.
- Alternation of teams until every player has acted at least once.

== Common signals ==
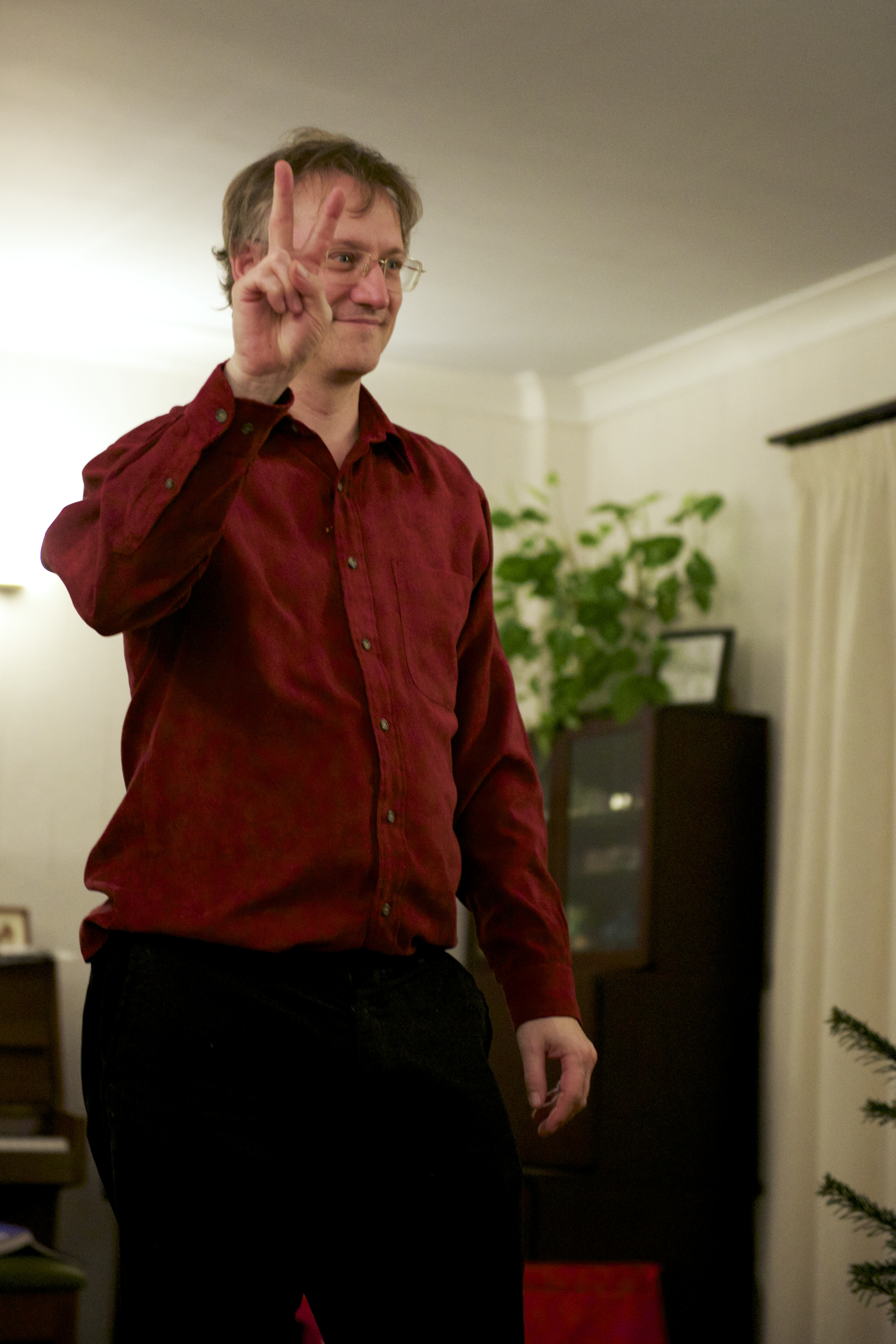
A player using two fingers to signal to his teammates that the answer has two words

The following gestures are commonly used in the game:

- A number of fingers at the beginning of play gives the number of words in the answer. Holding the number on the opposite inside elbow denotes the number of syllables in a particular word.
- To indicate a book, hold hands, palm up, side-to-side, and pretend to read a book.
- To indicate a song, throw one arm up while gesturing the other palm-up to your mouth, and pretend to sing.
- To indicate a movie, pretend to crank an old movie camera.
- To indicate a tv program, use the pointer finger of both hands to draw a rectangle in the air.
- To indicate a theater production/play, take a bow.
- Pointing at or tugging on an earlobe means "sounds like"
- Moving hands or fingers closer together without touching means "shorter"
- Holding the hands or fingers close together without touching indicates a short word such as "if" or "of" that is difficult to act out on its own
- A "T" gesture, like "time out", means "the".
- "Come on", "close", or "keep guessing" may be indicated by any "come here" gesture or by holding one's hands toward each other and spinning them in circles
- "More" or "add a suffix" may be indicated by similar movements or by miming the act of stretching out a rubber band
- "I" may be signed either by gesturing to one's chest or eye
- "Yes, correct", in addition to more general signs such as nodding, is often expressed in charades by pointing at or touching the nose with one hand while pointing at the correct guesser with the other, signifying "on the nose"
- In India, thumbs up means English language, thumbs down is Hindi, thumb in horizontal position is a state language like Tamil, Malayalam, Kannada, etc.
- "OK sign" can mean 3, 0, or the middle finger (in Portuguese).

Some of these signs may be banned from some forms of the game.

== See also ==
- Time's Up!
- Dumb crambo
- Cryptic crossword, for a type of clue based on this game
- Pictionary, a game inspired by charades where players draw words or phrases
- Concept
