= Toukana Interactive =

German indie game studio

Toukana Interactive GmbH
- Formerly: Toukana Interactive UG
- Industry: Video games
- Founded: 2020
- Founder: Luca Langenberg; Sandro Heuberger; Timo Falcke; Zwi Zausch
- Headquarters: Berlin
- Products: Dorfromantik; Star Birds
- Website: https://www.toukana.com/

Toukana Interactive GmbH is a German indie game studio based in Berlin. The studio was founded in 2020 by four students at HTW Berlin. As of December 2025, they have published two games: Dorfromantik and Star Birds.

== History ==
Toukana Interactive was founded in early 2020 by German and Swiss students Luca Langenberg, Sandro Heuberger, Timo Falcke, and Zwi Zausch. They began developing their debut game, Dorfromantik, as part of a master's degree in Game Design at HTW Berlin. The group met during their bachelor's studies, and were compelled to start an indie studio by their master's program at the university. During this time, they made 10 different prototype games. Toukana received 110,000 euros in funding from the Medienboard Berlin-Brandenburg for development of Dorfromantik. The game was released in early access in March 2021 and in full in April 2022. Later in 2022, a board game adaptation of Dorfromantik was released by Pegasus Spiele. Due to the game's high sales performance, the studio was able to pay back its debts all at one time. In August 2023, the company was incorporated as a GmbH, having been a UG previously. In 2024, Toukana announced a partnership with Kurzgesagt. They collaborated on a game, Star Birds, which was released in September 2025.

Toukana is headquartered in the Lichtenberg borough of Berlin. As of May 2022, Toukana employed 6 people. The company publishes their games themselves without a publisher.

== Games ==
Name	Year	Notes
Dorfromantik	2022	
Star Birds	2025	Collaboration with Kurzgesagt. The game was formerly known as "Project Mango".

== Awards ==
In 2021, Toukana's Dorfromantik won "Best Debut" and "Best Game Design" at the Deutscher Computerspielpreis.
