= Dorfromantik =

2022 video game

- Developer: Toukana Interactive
- Publisher: Toukana Interactive
- Designers: Timo Falcke; Sandro Heuberger; Luca Langenberg; Zwi Zausch
- Composers: Laryssa Okada; Pygoscelis
- Engine: Unity
- Platforms: Windows; macOS; Nintendo Switch; PlayStation 4; PlayStation 5; Xbox One; Xbox X/S
- Release: Windows; April 28, 2022; Nintendo Switch; September 29, 2022; PS4, PS5, XB1, XBXS; August 14, 2025
- Genres: Puzzle, strategy
- Mode: Single-player

Dorfromantik is a 2022 strategy and puzzle video game developed and published by Toukana Interactive. The player places a series of hexagonal tiles containing elements of a pastoral environment to create a landscape. They earn points and additional tiles by connecting like sides of the tiles together, closing off fields, forests, and villages, and completing quests to make areas of contiguous regions. An additional creative mode allows the player to create their own landscapes.

The game was developed by four German and Swiss students in a game design master's program at HTW Berlin: Timo Falcke, Sandro Heuberger, Luca Langenberg, and Zwi Zausch. They founded Toukana to create a peaceful, minimalist game, as they felt it may be their last chance to work together without other focuses. Dorfromantik was started as one of several small prototypes in early 2020, but garnered early notice after being included in an Itch.io game bundle and became the team's focus. The game's title is an older German word meaning "village romanticization", or a nostalgic feeling for the countryside, and the game itself was inspired by romanticist and impressionist landscape paintings and city-building games.

Dorfromantik was first released as an early access title in March 2021, which led to a spike in attention, as well as awards and nominations. After several updates, the full version was released for Windows in April 2022, and was followed by a Nintendo Switch port in September 2022 and ports for PlayStation and Xbox consoles in August 2025 and macOS in June 2026. Critics gave the game positive reviews, especially for its aesthetics and design, but had mixed opinions on its depth of gameplay. A cooperative board game version was published by Pegasus Spiele as Dorfromantik: The Board Game in February 2023, which won that year's Spiel des Jahres award. It was followed by other versions of the board game, including a competitive two-player version, Dorfromantik: The Duel, in February 2024.

== Gameplay ==
The player has many tiles placed and 30 tiles remaining, with over 18,000 points. The next tile to be placed has two sides railroad and four barren, with an associated quest to make a railroad line which includes at least 97 tiles.

Dorfromantik is a single-player strategy and puzzle video game in which the player places a series of hexagonal tiles containing elements of a pastoral environment on a plane to create a landscape. Each tile consists of one to six land types: forest, barren, village, water, railroad, and field, with each side assigned to a type. The game begins with a placed tile with all six sides barren, and a stack of 40 random tiles to be placed. The player can only place the top tile from the stack, and can only see the top three tiles. Tiles can be rotated before being placed and can be put anywhere in the landscape as long as it touches at least one existing tile. The sole restriction is that placed tiles cannot cause water paths or railroad lines to abruptly end at the edge of a tile. Once placed, a tile cannot be moved again, although the player can undo their actions.

Points are awarded when a tile is placed for how many edges match the edges of neighboring tiles. Some tiles have associated quests, such as creating a railway line including that tile with a minimum length, or creating a contiguous field including that tile with an exact number of edges. Quests may also have a follow-up quest to close off the area, such as a field, so that no more field edges can be joined to it. Completing quests awards points and gives the player additional tiles, as does matching a tile's edges with those of all six surrounding tiles. The game ends when the player runs out of tiles. Hidden tiles with quests can be found a distance from the starting position, which, if completed, unlock achievements. Completing these achievements grants the player new tile designs, such as a clock tower village tile or an animal that wanders a forest, as well as biomes, or art styles for the game. In addition to the standard game mode, there is a creative mode with no tile limit, a quick mode with a limited number of tiles, and challenge modes with modified rules.

== Development ==
Dorfromantik was developed by four German and Swiss students studying at HTW Berlin: Timo Falcke, Sandro Heuberger, Luca Langenberg, and Zwi Zausch. The four had all received their bachelor's degree in game design from the university, and Heuberger and Falcke had created and published the game ViSP - Virtual Space Port. After graduating they all began jobs, but when HTW Berlin started a master's program in game design they returned. As they began their first semester in the master's program there, the four founded Toukana Interactive to create games as they felt it was the last time in their lives they knew they would all be together focusing on their own projects instead of working at other companies. They wanted to focus Toukana on creating "minimalistic, inviting games". The group focused their master's theses on the creation of a game and received support from the school's DE:HIVE Institute for starting the company.

They built ten different prototype games that semester, each over a few days; one of them was created for a Ludum Dare game jam at the end of April with the theme "Keep it Alive". The group approached the theme of the game jam with the concept of "keeping a civilization alive by balancing it out with its surrounding nature". They chose to use placing tiles as a simple core mechanic, then added quests to give a purpose to placing the tiles. At the end of the two day game jam, the core gameplay of Dorfromatik was complete, and the team had a clear vision of where they would take the game. They chose Dorfromantik as the game's placeholder title, an older German word that translates into "village romanticization", or a nostalgic feeling for the countryside. Although they were advised to change it for English-speaking audiences, the name ended up sticking.

In June 2020, Itch.io sold a bundle of over 1700 games for charity, titled the "Bundle for Racial Justice and Equality". Dorfromantik was included in the bundle, which sold over 800,000 copies, leading to a spike in attention to the game. Feeling that the game was the most promising of the prototypes, the team decided to pursue developing it. The four worked on the game for nearly two more years; originally they planned to release the final game in late 2021, but the positive reception to the game caused them to release an early access version six months early on March 25, 2021. This release again gained a great deal of attention, and the following month the game won Best Game Design and Best Debut and was nominated for Best Family Game at the Deutscher Computerspielpreis (German Computer Games Awards), followed by a nomination for Best Student Game at the Independent Games Festival Awards in May. The studio hired a community manager and marketing professional and continued developing the game. They decided to self-publish the game, as they felt one of the goals of the project was to learn all of the parts of creating a game themselves.

At the time of the early access release, Toukana still planned on releasing the full game in late 2021. In July, however, this was pushed out to spring 2022. The team spent the remainder of the development time improving the game and adding features, such as the creative mode in August 2021, and additional biomes, quests, and tiles. The game continued to receive attention, was nominated for Best Indie Game at the 2021 Gamescom trade show in August, and won Best German Game at the Deutscher Entwicklerpreis (German Developer Awards) in December. The full release of the game for Windows was on April 28, 2022, and included additional game modes and music. A version for the Nintendo Switch was released on September 29, 2022, and versions for PlayStation 4, PlayStation 5, Xbox One, and Xbox X/S were released by Headup Games on August 14, 2025. A macOS version of the game was released on June 25, 2026. A mobile version of the game is under development by ClockStone Studio, to be published by Headup Games.

The design of the game was inspired by European board games, as well as by the video games Islanders (2019), Townscaper (2021), and Tetris (1985). The game's setting was inspired by the four team members themselves, as they had all grown up in the German and Swiss countryside, in different settings ranging from mountains to the seaside. The art style was influenced by landscape paintings with a romantic, idealized style, particularly romanticist and impressionist paintings, rather than realistic portrayals. The music was composed by Laryssa Okada and Pygoscelis; the team asked them to make ambient and meditative tracks that would not be boring or distract from the gameplay. The twelve tracks for the game were released as two separate purchases alongside the game's early access and full release as Dorfromantik Soundtrack Vol. 1 and 2. A "Medieval Biome Pack", adding three new biomes, was released for sale in June 2026.

== Reception ==
Reception

Aggregate score
Aggregator	Score
Metacritic	(PC) 80/100 (NS) 82/100

Review scores
Publication	Score
Destructoid	8/10
Edge	7/10
Game Informer	8/10
GameStar	81/100
Nintendo Life	8/10
Nintendo World Report	8.5/10
Shacknews	9/10

Dorfromantik received "generally favorable reviews", according to the review aggregator website Metacritic. In addition to the awards it won and was nominated for during development, after the release of the full game, it was nominated for the "Sit Back and Relax" category at the 2022 Steam Awards and Best Indie Game at the 2022 Golden Joystick Awards. Toukana has not released any sales numbers, but did say that they were able to pay back all of their grants as soon as the game was released in early access, as well as fund the development of their next game.

Critics highly praised the gameplay, though there were mixed opinions on the depth. Several reviewers, such as Wolfgang Rabenstein of GameStar, Robert Purchese of Eurogamer, and the reviewer for Edge, called the gameplay "pleasant and relaxing", "satisfying", and "meditative". Katharine Castle of Rock Paper Shotgun said it was one of the "most charming, welcoming and relaxing game worlds". Marcus Stewart of Game Informer and Neal Ronaghan of Nintendo World Report said that it had a good balance of coziness and strategy, while Zoey Handley of Destructoid felt that it had too little strategy, leading their mind to wander. Mitch Vogel of Nintendo Life took a stronger tone, saying that the gameplay was "relatively shallow in the long run". Oli Welsh of Polygon, in contrast, found the game to be an engaging puzzle to solve once he focused on perfectly placing tiles rather than straightforwardly playing. This duality of experience was summed up by Hikaru Nomura of IGN Japan as a "gap" in the gameplay—that players could either peacefully place tiles as they saw fit to finish quests or else spend much more time focusing on perfect tile placement to get a high score, with no middle ground.

The presentation of the game was universally praised. Polygon called it "gorgeous and toylike" and "aesthetically cleansing" and IGN Japan praised the "idyllic visuals". Game Informer said it created a "Zen atmosphere", and praised the way the biomes would shift into each other as the landscape grew; Rock Paper Shotgun said that this created a feeling of "hazy summer holidays, crisp autumnal afternoons and cozy winter nights". Rock Paper Shotgun also praised the music and sound design, as did IGN Japan, which said that it was a perfect match for the rural landscape. Morgan Shaver of Shacknews called it a "treat for the ears", and said that the music, background noises, and sound effects for actions all "meshes together seamlessly" to make a peaceful experience.

=== Accolades ===
Accolades
Year	Award	Category	Result	Ref.
2021	23rd Independent Games Festival Awards	Best Student Game	Nominated	
2021	Gamescom Awards	Best Indie Game	Nominated	
2021	Deutscher Computerspielpreis (German Computer Games Awards)	Best Family Game	Nominated	
2021	Deutscher Computerspielpreis (German Computer Games Awards)	Best Game Design	Won	
2021	Deutscher Computerspielpreis (German Computer Games Awards)	Young Talent Award Best Debut	Won	
2021	Deutscher Entwicklerpreis (German Developer Awards)	Best German Game	Won	
2022	The Steam Awards	Sit Back and Relax	Nominated	
2022	38th Golden Joystick Awards	Best Indie Game	Nominated	

== Board game adaptations ==
In 2023, a board game adaptation of Dorfromantik was published as Dorfromantik: The Board Game by Pegasus Spiele. It was designed by independent designers Lucas Zach and Michael Palm; Zach had seen Dorfromantik's Deutscher Computerspielpreis award wins and tried out the game, then the pair asked Pegasus, with which they regularly worked, to approach Toukana. According to Pegasus co-founder Karsten Esser, this is the opposite of the norm for popular video games, where typically the rights-holders approach a board game maker to make a spin-off game. Palm and Zach quickly made a digital prototype for a board game, and Toukana agreed to pursue the project. According to Palm, adapting the video game to a board game was generally straightforward due to its design; the primary challenge was changing the computer-controlled systems so that the player would not need to make any calculations until the end of the game.

Dorfromantik: The Board Game was released in February 2023. It is a cooperative game that can be played with one to six players, with games taking 30 to 60 minutes. Like in the video game, new tiles and elements are unlocked as the game is repeatedly played, with players encouraged to record their scores as a "campaign" to earn the right to open up sealed boxes. It won the 2023 Spiel des Jahres award, and was a Recommended Casual Game in the 2024 American Tabletop Awards. While sales numbers have not been published by Pegasus or Toukana, Frankfurter Allgemeine Zeitung claimed in November 2023 that it had sold 500,000 copies, and according to Esser winning the Spiel des Jahres typically results in hundreds of thousands of extra sales to retailers in the following months.

New versions of the board game have been released since the initial launch. Three mini expansions for the game, "The Great Mill", containing a mill figure and two new cards, "The Wetterau", comprising three new tiles, and "The Limes", containing eight tiles commemorating the anniversary of the Lower Germanic Limes becoming a UNESCO World Heritage Site, were released in October 2023, June 2024, and October 2026, respectively. A competitive version of the game for two players was released as Dorfromantik: The Duel in February 2024, and a faster-paced version was released as Dorfromantik: Head to Head in October 2026. A sequel to the original board game, Dorfromantik: Sakura, was released in November 2024, with similar gameplay but new tiles and a new "cherry blossom" mechanic. A compact version of the game, with smaller tiles, shorter playing time, and a small carrying case was released in November 2025 as Dorfromantik: Light Luggage. A version themed after tropical islands, Dorfromantik: South Seas, was released in October 2026.
