= Kurzgesagt =

German animation studio and YouTube channel

Kurzgesagt Inc.
- Kurzgesagt – In a Nutshell
- Kurzgesagt's logo, a minimalist representation of the Earth
- Pronunciation: /ˌkʊərtsɡəˈzɑːkt/
- Formation: 10 July 2013; 13 years ago
- Founder: Philipp Dettmer
- Type: Private
- Headquarters: Munich, Germany
- Location: Germany
- Fields: Science; Space; Technology; Biology; History; Philosophy; Physics
- Official languages: English; German; French; Spanish; Portuguese; Arabic; Hindi; Japanese; Korean
- Owner: Philipp Dettmer
- Managing director: Peter Berger
- Website: kurzgesagt.org

YouTube information
- Channel: Kurzgesagt – In a Nutshell
- Years active: 2013–present
- Genres: Science Space Technology; Biology History Philosophy Physics
- Subscribers: 25.6 million
- Views: 3.90 billion
- Last updated: 5 October 2026

Kurzgesagt (/ˌkʊərtsɡəˈzɑːkt/, /ˈkʊərtsɡəˌzɑːkt/; German for "In a nutshell", "in short", or literally "shortly said"; German pronunciation: [ˈkʊʁt͡sɡəˌzaːkt]) is a German animation and design studio founded by Philipp Dettmer. The studio is best known for its YouTube channel, which is well known for its animated educational content using minimalistic, flat and in some cases with 3D graphics. It discusses scientific, technological, political, philosophical, and psychological subjects.

Narrated in English by Steve Taylor, many videos are also available through other language-specific channels, such as in German through the channel Dinge Erklärt – Kurzgesagt, and in Spanish through En Pocas Palabras – Kurzgesagt. Some of their videos are also available in French, Hindi, Arabic, Brazilian Portuguese, Japanese and Korean.

As of June 2026, with over 25 million subscribers and more than 350 videos (including shorts), the studio's original English-language channel was the world's 270th most subscribed channel.

== History ==
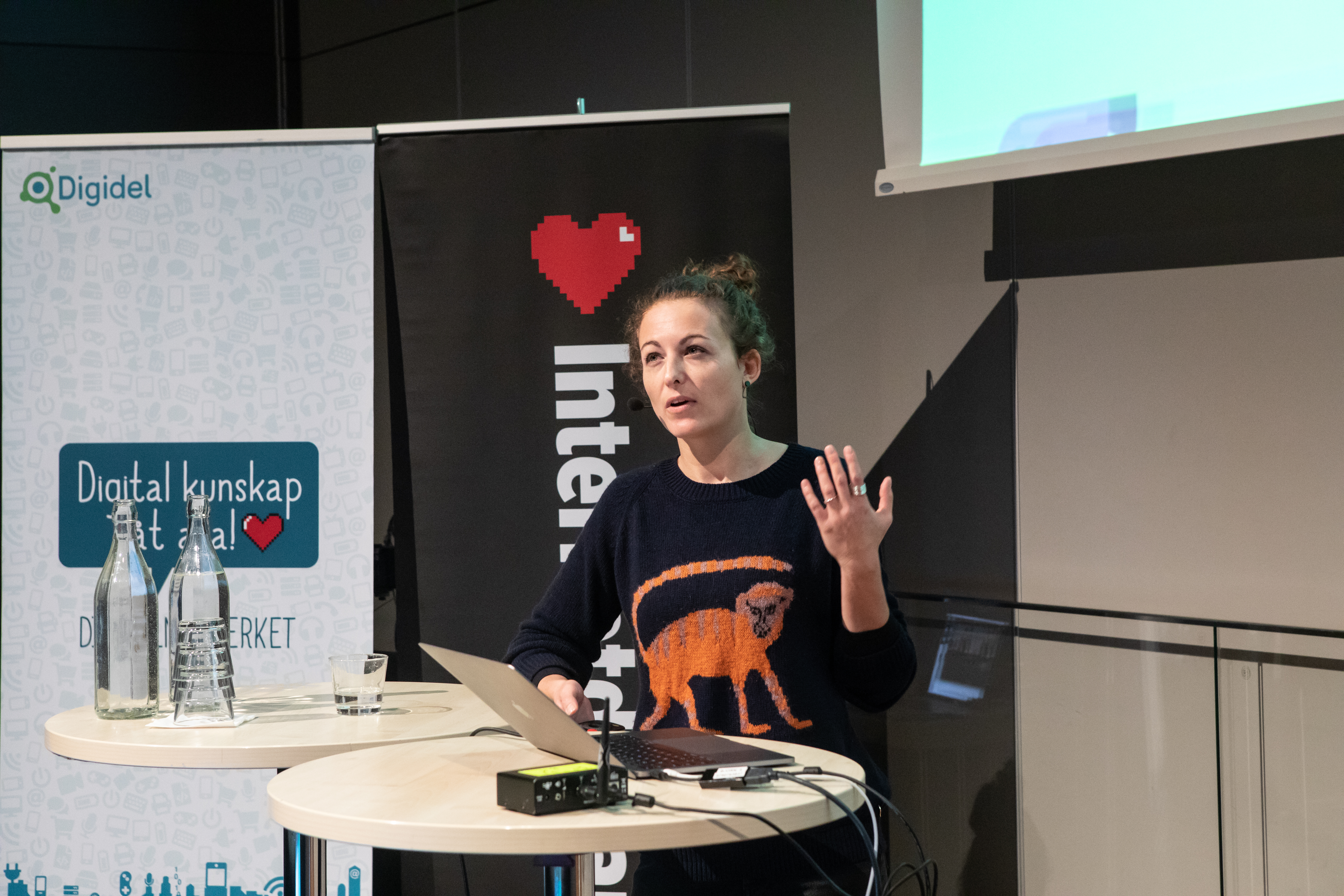
Patrizia Mosca, Chief operating officer at Kurzgesagt, speaks at the Internet Days in Stockholm, 2018.

The Kurzgesagt YouTube channel was created on 10 July 2013 (with their first video coming out on 12 July 2013), shortly after the founder, Philipp Dettmer, graduated from Munich University of Applied Sciences. The first video, which explained evolution, was published two days later with the voice of Steve Taylor, who has remained the channel's commentator. In ten years the channel evolved from a passion project worked on during Dettmer's free time to a design studio with about seventy on the team. In 2015, Kurzgesagt was commissioned to create a video on the end of disease by the Bill and Melinda Gates Foundation.

A video about the COVID-19 pandemic, called The Coronavirus Explained & What You Should Do and released in March 2020, was posted on all three of their channels. It shared how the human body responds to COVID-19 and how effective the measures are in evading SARS-CoV-2. The English version has over 89 million views, making it the most viewed video on the channel. A study published in Visual Resources said that the video "is an example of an aesthetically compelling explanation of the biological processes of a Covid infection," and it "includes fantastical depictions that convey the message in a more comprehensible straightforward manner."

Kurzgesagt has received several awards. In 2019, Kurzgesagt became the first German channel to surpass 10 million subscribers on YouTube. In December 2020, fellow YouTuber Marques Brownlee honoured Kurzgesagt, with his "Streamys Creator Honor" award in the 10th Streamy Awards.

In February 2026, Kurzgesagt created a second channel called Nightshift - Kurzgesagt After Dark, which focuses on the "weird, beautiful, and sometimes unsettling side of history".

=== Immune: A Journey Into The Mysterious System That Keeps You Alive ===
In November 2021, Kurzgesagt announced the release of their first book, "Immune: A Journey Into The Mysterious System That Keeps You Alive" written by Philipp Dettmer, the channel's founder.

A publication by the Foundation for the Rights of Future Generations, a German think tank, recommended the book among others for books on the COVID-19 pandemic, describing it as "full of stories of invasion, strategy, defeat, and noble self-sacrifice", in introducing the complex world of the immune system. Daniel M. Davis, the Head of Life Sciences and Professor of Immunology at Imperial College London, described it as "the feast we have been waiting for" due to the public interest in the mechanisms of the immune system, such as antibodies, T cells, and B cells, during the COVID-19 pandemic, which were "rarely discussed outside of research labs and scientific talks". In the book, the author acknowledges the feedback and help of a Dr. James Gurney, Professor Thomas Brocker, the director of the Munich Institute for Immunology, and Professor Maristela Martins de Camargo of the University of São Paulo.

=== Sources of funding ===
In 2015, the channel received a US$570,000 grant from the Bill and Melinda Gates Foundation.

Since September 2017, Kurzgesagt's German branch had been financially supported by the network Funk of ARD and ZDF. Kurzgesagt's German branch announced their departure from Funk in January 2023.

In March 2022, Kurzgesagt received €2.97 million in a grant via Open Philanthropy, which the channel said was being used for translating their videos into various languages, and for funding the creation of content for TikTok. The channel has received a smaller grant from the John Templeton Foundation.

In a January 2023 statement, Kurzgesagt stated that 65% of their income from 2020 to 2022 came from viewers via the sale of merchandise from their shop, such as mugs, posters and toys, crowdfunding via Patreon, and Google AdSense revenue, with commercial or institutional sponsorships and grants accounting for only 24% of income. The statement said that the channel treats all data sceptically, that their sources for statements are always given, and that all research work is done in-house, with no editorial influence from sponsors or donors—a condition they say is included in every deal they have signed. Kurzgesagt made this statement in response to a December 2022 video which accused them of having been "basically bought off by billionaires".

=== Star Birds ===
In June 2024, the studio announced they had partnered with Toukana Interactive, the creators of Dorfromantik, to create a video game called Star Birds that would be centred around asteroid mining. The game was released on 10 September 2025 in early access with a 10% discount as an introductory offer.

== Criticism ==
=== Reliability of videos ===
While some commentators have praised Kurzgesagt's videos for their reliability and fact-checking, some of their earlier work received criticism. In 2016, the Art Libraries Society of North America criticised the studio's occasional lack of credible sources and professional consultation, and use of emotive language.

In 2019, Kurzgesagt released a video saying that while they now had all their arguments fact-checked by experts, they had not always done so in the past. They added they were removing two of their videos uploaded in 2015 that did not meet their current standards, namely The European Refugee Crisis and Syria and Addiction. A collaboration between Kurzgesagt and journalist Johann Hari, Addiction came to be one of the most popular on their channel at the time, despite also being one of their most criticised. The video was accused of misleadingly summarising the conclusions of the contentious Rat Park experiments. Kurzgesagt acknowledged they had presented one argument as fact, and had not considered other theories on the matter.

In July 2024, Kurzgesagt released a video entitled We Need to Rethink Exercise - The Workout Paradox, which was criticised by viewers who considered it too simplified. Kurzgesagt subsequently consulted with more experts in the field and released an updated version of the video in September to address these concerns. Tubefilter rated the updated version as one of the top sponsored videos released on YouTube that week.
