= Dorfromantik: The Board Game =

2022 board game

- Designers: Michael Palm, Lukas Zach
- Illustrators: Paul Riebe
- Publishers: Pegasus Spiele
- Publication: November 2022
- Genres: Cooperative tile-laying game
- Players: 1–6
- Playing time: 30–60 minutes
- Age range: 8+
- Website: www.toukana.com/dorfromantik/boardgames

Dorfromantik: The Board Game (German: Dorfromantik: Das Brettspiel; lit. 'Village Romance') is a board game by Lukas Zach and Michael Palm based on the video game of the same name. The game was published by the German game company Pegasus Spiele in 2022. Dorfromantik is a cooperative game in which players lay hexagonal tiles to create a landscape of various terrains, while also managing tasks to score more points. Dorfromantik also has a campaign mode in which players open boxes as they play games to continually increase their scores. It has won several awards both in Germany and abroad, including the 2023 Spiel des Jahres (transl. Game of the Year).

As of November 2026, three mini-expansions for Dorfromantik have been released: The Great Mill, The Wetterau, and The Limes. In addition, two subsequent stand-alone board games have been launched: Dorfromantik: Sakura, and Dorfromantik: South Seas. Dorfromantik: The Duel and Dorfromantik: Head to Head are the two competitive versions that have been published. In October 2025, a compact version of the game was released, Dorfromantik: Light Luggage.

== Background and development ==
The video game Dorfromantik was developed in Berlin by Toukana Interactive – a German indie game studio founded in 2020 as part of a master's degree program at the HTW Berlin. The video game version of Dorfromantik was inspired by board games and designed to look like one. The first prototype of the video game was published in April 2020 during a game jam called Ludum Dare, and released into early access in March 2021. It was released in full on 28 April 2022. Dorfromantik: The Board Game is based on and named after the video game. The artwork in the board game was illustrated by Paul Riebe.

Lukas Zach first found out about the video game Dorfromantik when it won the Deutscher Computerspielpreis (transl. German PC Game Award) in 2021; Iron Harvest from his studio King Art Games had also been nominated for the award. This drew Zach's attention to the video game, as it was similar to a tile-placement board game that he and Michael Palm, the other designer of Dorfromantik: The Board Game, had been working on for several years. The pair soon started communicating with Toukana to begin collaboration on a board game version of Dorfromantik, and agreed on a licensed cooperation after Toukana was shown the prototype. After much playtesting, the two teams first met in person at Essen SPIEL. Karsten Esser, CEO of Pegasus Spiele, said of the process that they "worked the other way around" from normal, as usually a successful video game publisher will approach board game designers instead of the reverse.

Work continued during the COVID-19 lockdown, and progress was only minimally hindered because the design of Dorfromantik lent itself well to remote development. According to Palm, although the video game and board game prototypes were similar, the adaptation still required extensive modification in order to minimise the management needed during gameplay. In the video game, the computer could manage tile selection and "count the number of trees in a forest", but in the board game, changes needed to be made so that the player only has to tally points at the end of the game. As such, one of the changes included shifting the task requirements in the board game adaptation from individual items (i.e. trees) to whole tiles.

Michael Palm and Lukas Zach live on opposite sides of Germany, and first met each other in the early 2000s when Zach randomly chose to write a letter to the designer of one of the board games in his collection in order to discover more about the process of board game design. He sent a letter to Palm, who at the time ran a board game and comic book shop near Lake Constance. The two soon met in person and began designing games, publishing with Pegasus Spiele. Their first game together was Die Kutschfahrt zur Teufelsburg, which they published in 2006, and they have continued to collaborate since on many other games.

Paul Riebe, who illustrated the game and is best known for his work on Dorfromantik, is a German artist who works in the entertainment industry on video games and films. He said in an interview that Dorfromantik was the first board game he had ever illustrated, and that the most difficult part of the art design was maintaining the original video game's "charming style" while still adhering to the requirements of a board game.

A small amount of preview board game copies were presented at Essen SPIEL 2022. Dorfromantik: Das Brettspiel, the German version of the board game, was first released in November 2022. The English edition premiered in the United States in March 2023.

== Gameplay ==
Gameplay of Dorfromantik, showing the hexagonal tiles. Each of the terrain types (wheat fields, forests, villages, railway tracks, rivers, and meadows) are visible. Flags and task markers can also be seen.

Dorfromantik is a cooperative game and consists of the basic game and a campaign. In the basic game, players place hexagonal tiles, or hexes, to create a landscape with wheat fields, forests, villages, meadows, railroads, and rivers while trying to complete tasks to gain points. At the conclusion of a game, players advance along a campaign sheet, and eventually unlock small campaign boxes which contain new material for future games. The game is designed for 1–6 players.

=== Basic game ===
In the basic game of Dorfromantik, there are two main types of tiles: Landscape tiles and Task tiles. On Dorfromantik's tiles, there are six terrain types, although not all of them are always present. The five terrains with task tiles are wheat fields, forests, villages, railroad tracks, and rivers, and the remaining "neutral" terrain type is meadows. With the exception of railroads and rivers, any terrain can stop or continue on any hex edge, meaning that terrain features do not need to match at tile edges. Except for the very first tile, all tiles placed must be connected by at least one edge to the rest of the game map.

When a task tile is placed, a random task marker of the same terrain type is drawn. On one side, task markers have a terrain type, and on the other side is a number from four to six. The number on the front of the task marker is exactly how many tiles of the terrain shown must be connected in order to score points. The greater the number on the front of the marker, the more points are scored by completing the task. Flags printed on tiles score more points for large territories, as long as the territory has been closed off (i.e., no tile edges with the type of terrain matching the flag are open to the edge of the map).

To start, players draw three task tiles and place them down to start the map. After these three original tasks are drawn and placed, landscape tiles start being drawn. These landscape tiles are used to expand territories, and therefore complete tasks for points. Once a task is completed, the next player draws another task to always bring the number of tasks to three. As soon as a player is required to draw a landscape tile and none remain, the game ends immediately and scoring begins. In the basic game, points are scored based on completed tasks, flags, and the longest railroad track and river.

=== Campaign ===
After scoring is complete, players may start or continue a campaign. On the campaign sheet, players round their score down to the nearest ten, then match their rounded score to the number of circles to advance and consult the number of steps on the sheet that they can fill in. The number shown on the sheet corresponds to circles on the sheet, which are filled in by the players to unlock campaign boxes and achievement cards. The campaign starts with five closed boxes. These boxes contain other ways to score points such as new tokens, tiles, or achievement cards. In addition to the tiles from the basic game, there is also a third type of tile that comes in the campaign boxes, Special tiles, which can be identified by a printed black signpost.

While there is no definitive end to Dorfromantik, the campaign eventually runs out of boxes and achievements to unlock, which usually takes 15–20 games. Following this, the game does not have any more campaign content remaining. Players can either start the campaign again or keep playing without unlocking any more campaign content.

=== Solo play ===
While Dorfromantik does not come with a dedicated solo mode, the game is compatible to be played solo with few adjustments, due to the lack of intrinsic inter-player interaction. A reviewer from the German online board game magazine Reich der Spiele (transl. Realm of Games) said that the game functions best in solo mode and recommends using many bonus tiles. Arkadiusz Deroszewski from Board Times recommended the game for solo play, saying that the solo nature of the video game had translated well onto the board game adaptation, but also maintained that the game worked best with 2–3 players.

== Subsequent board games and expansions ==
=== Stand-alone games ===
==== Dorfromantik: Sakura ====
About a year after the release of Dorfromantik: The Duel, a new stand-alone game, Dorfromantik: Sakura, was published in late 2024. It is based on the original design of Dorfromantik but is set in a Japanese landscape. Dorfromantik: Sakura retains the campaign system from the original game, with six boxes and 40 achievements. The rules of Dorfromantik: Sakura are very similar to the original, with only the terrain art design greatly changed. In Dorfromantik: Sakura, cherry blossom trees replace forests from the original Dorfromantik, rice paddies replace wheat fields, and roads replace railroads. However, the campaign part of the game is modified to fit the new theme, with a new campaign sheet and new achievements which unlock new game material unique to the game. While the original Dorfromantik only requires points from game scores, Dorfromantik: Sakura has another campaign mechanic, cherry blossoms. These allow the player to progress further in the campaign, unlocking new boxes. Reviewers of the game noted that, while it does bring some new campaign material, the basic game rules are almost entirely the same as the original.

==== Dorfromantik: Light Luggage ====
Dorfromantik: Light Luggage (German: Dorfromantik: Leichtes Gepäck) is a compact, stand-alone version of Dorfromantik which released in German in late 2025. This smaller version of the game includes most of the base game's features, but tiles are fewer and smaller, playing time is reduced, and the campaign rules are simplified. Dorfromantik: Light Luggage can also function as an introduction to the board game and is more accessible to a wider audience. Some material from Dorfromantik: Light Luggage can be used when playing the base Dorfromantik game.

==== Dorfromantik: South Seas ====
A new stand-alone game based on Dorfromantik was released in October 2026, called Dorfromantik: South Seas. The game is set on tropical islands and contains new components including mangroves, fish, and beach huts. South Seas contains a new campaign with five boxes, including new mechanics such as movable boats that collect fish as they move between islands. According to Pegasus Spiele, South Seas is near the same complexity level as Sakura. The new stand-alone game takes the same theme as the early prototypes of Dorfromantik had had, before the designers began collaborating with Toukana Interactive. This game contains a built-in solo mode.

=== Competitive games ===
==== Dorfromantik: The Duel ====
A new competitive game based on Dorfromantik was released by Pegasus in late 2023 called Dorfromantik: The Duel (German: Dorfromantik: Das Duell). Dorfromantik: The Duel is similar in style to the original game, but it is competitive and places two players against each other. It introduces new task types as well as a tile-matching system between the two players, eliminating most aspects of luck and making the game perfectly symmetrical. As opposed to the base game, in Dorfromantik: The Duel the two players each have their own game space. During play, players draw the same tile and place it on their personal board. Task and landscape tiles work similar to the original Dorfromantik, but there is a larger ratio of tasks relative to landscape tiles. Tasks themselves are also mostly the same as in the original. The game, like the original, has flags that score for enclosed territories. Dorfromantik: The Duel has two new types of tasks: wraparound and double tasks. Wraparound tasks, like in Dorfromantik: Sakura, are completed once the listed number of tiles have been placed surrounding the task tile. For double tasks, two landscape options are shown. When either of the options have reached the required number of tiles, the task is completed. The playtime of Dorfromantik: The Duel lasts longer than the original game, often reaching up to two hours.

Although Dorfromantik: The Duel does not have a campaign progression system, being the only stand-alone Dorfromantik game without one, it does contain two "modules". Unlike the campaigns from other games, the modules can be unlocked at any time and are optional to play with. Module 1 contains nine new task cards, and Module 2 contains markers that activate new mechanics, such as hearts, photographers, and special tiles. Dorfromantik: The Duel also comes with several new tiles, counters, and cards for the base game of Dorfromantik. The new task types, wraparound and double, can be integrated into the original game, as well as the special tiles and photographer from Module 2.

Reviews of the game have been mixed. The game has been criticised for taking up an excessive amount of space on the table. Due to the nature of the tile-matching, all 183 tiles have to be spread out on the table, taking up a lot of room. Dorfromantik: The Duel has also received criticism for the incredibly close final scores, as small mistakes near the beginning of the game can have a large effect on the end result. In a review, Spieletest.at enjoyed how the game is competitive, but with limited interference between players.

==== Dorfromantik: Head to Head ====
Dorfromantik: Head to Head is another stand-alone competitive version of Dorfromantik. It is divided into two phases: first, players select their tiles, then they place those tiles that they selected. The game includes new closed terrain features, such as mountains and lakes. Head to Head is designed to be faster-paced than Dorfromantik: The Duel, the other competitive edition.

=== Mini-expansions ===
In 2023, a mini-expansion for Dorfromantik was released called The Great Mill (German: Große Mühle). It contains a small cardboard standee of a windmill which is used to score extra points in field tiles, as well as two new cards. The mini-expansion was announced following Dorfromantik's Spiel des Jahres win in 2023. Another mini-expansion, The Wetterau (German: Die Wetterau), was released in June 2024 consisting of three new tiles depicting landmarks in the Wetterau. In July 2026, a mini-expansion for Light Luggage, The Limes, was released to commemorate the fifth anniversary of the Lower Germanic Limes' recognition as a UNESCO World Heritage Site. It was available at specialist retailers together with Light Luggage and was developed in collaboration with the Rhineland Regional Association. It is aimed at advanced players and contains eight markers representing the Roman limes.

== Reception ==
Dorfromantik has received overall positive reviews. IGN's Matt Thrower has said that the game "only gets more addictive the more you play". Matt Jarvis from Dicebreaker described the game as "charming" and a "relaxed, satisfying experience from beginning to end". A reviewer from the Tabletop Gaming magazine described Dorfromantik as "the board game equivalent of a warm bath with candles and relaxing music, followed by a lovely cuddle" and that it was "the perfect game if you want a relaxing, laid-back experience without any competitive pressure or heart-breaking failures". Michael Weber from Reich der Spiele called Dorfromantik a "feel-good game" (German: Wohlfühlspiel). Following its announcement as the winner for 2023, Dorfromantik was described by the Spiel des Jahres (transl. Game of the Year) jury as "idyllic" and a "feel-good game" that "takes the pressure out of everyday life". Dorfromantik also received some early criticism over the game's lack of a way to lose. Writing for Der Standard, Alexander Putzendolper found the simplistic art style of the game to be unenthusiastic, but praised the campaign system and its non-destructiveness. On the board game forum and database BoardGameGeek, the base game of Dorfromantik is ranked 328th with an average rating of 7.6 out of 10 as of November 2026. Pegasus reported that 500,000 copies of the game were sold by November 2023, a year after Dorfromantik's release.

== Awards ==
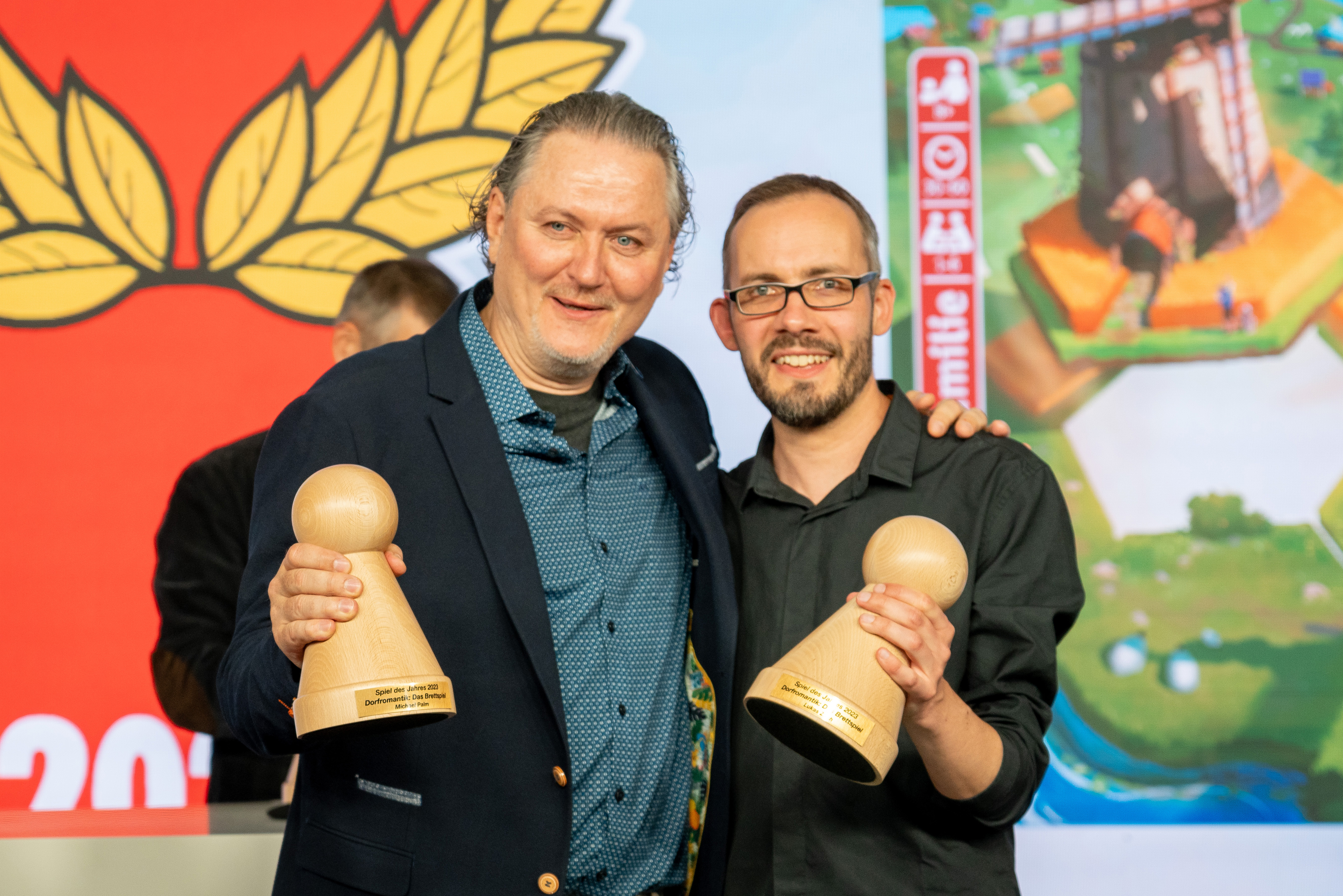
Dorfromantik won the 2023 Spiel des Jahres award.

Dorfromantik has won several awards from various countries. Its first major award came in 2023, when the Spiel des Jahres jury awarded the game first prize. That same year, it also won the silver medal at the Deutscher Spiele Preis (transl. German Games Prize). In 2024, Dorfromantik was awarded the Adult Game of the Year from Guldtärningen (transl. Golden Die) and was recommended in the Casual Games category by the American Tabletop Awards. Gra Roku and Guldbrikken received nominations for Dorfromantik in their Family Game of the Year and Best Family Game categories, respectively.

Awards and nominations
| Year | Award | Category | Result | Ref. |
|---|---|---|---|---|
| 2023 | Spiel des Jahres | Spiel des Jahres | Won | |
| 2023 | Deutscher Spiele Preis | German Games Prize | 2nd Place | |
| 2024 | American Tabletop Awards | Casual Games | Recommended | |
| 2024 | Guldtärningen | Adult Game of the Year | Won | |
| 2024 | Gra Roku | Family Game of the Year | Nominated | |
| 2024 | Guldbrikken | Best Family Game | Nominated | |
