= Love Letter (card game) =

2012 card game

Court the Royal Princess of Tempest
- Original box cover
- Designers: Seiji Kanai
- Publishers: AEG (2012–2018); Z-Man Games (2018–present)
- Players: 2 to 4 (original); 2 to 6 (Second Edition)
- Playing time: 20 minutes

Love Letter is a card game introduced in May 2012 and designed by Seiji Kanai. Its first English-language edition was produced in the United States by Alderac Entertainment Group (AEG) until 2018, when Love Letter was acquired by Z-Man Games (a subsidiary of Asmodee).

== Premise ==
Each player aims to deliver a love letter to the Princess with the assistance of relatives and acquaintances. Gameplay resembles the practice of medieval courting.

== Gameplay ==
- At the start of each round, one card is discarded face-down (four cards with three of them face-up if playing with two players; so the process of elimination cannot be used to prove which cards are left for the round), one card is dealt to each player and the rest are deposited face-down in the middle to form a draw deck.
- During each player's turn, one card is drawn from the deck and the player gets to play either that card or the card already in their hand.
- After processing the effect described on the played card, the next player to the left gets a turn.
- This process is repeated until either the deck runs out, in which case the player holding the highest-value card wins the round, or all players but one are eliminated, in which case the last player still in play wins the round.
- Once a round ends, the winner of the round receives a favor token. All cards are collected and shuffled, and play continues with a new round, with the winner of the previous round taking the first turn.
- The game ends when one player has accumulated a predetermined number of favor tokens (from 3 to 7, depending on the number of players), winning the game for that player.

== Card types ==
Below is the list of cards in the original edition of the game:

Card	Strength	Count	Effects
Guard	1	5	Player may choose another player and name a card other than the Guard. If the chosen player's hand contains the same card as named, that player is eliminated from the round.
Priest	2	2	Player may privately see another player's hand.
Baron	3	2	Player may choose another player and privately compare hands. The player with the lower-value card is eliminated from the round.
Handmaid	4	2	Player cannot be affected by any other player's cards until their next turn.
Prince	5	2	Player may choose any player (including themselves) to discard their hand and draw a new one.
King	6	1	Player may trade hands with another player.
Countess	7	1	Does nothing when played, but if the player has this card and either the King or the Prince in their hand, this card must be played immediately.
Princess	8	1	If the player plays or discards this card for any reason, they are eliminated from the round.

== Premium edition ==
A premium edition of Love Letter was released in 2016. It uses the same artwork as the original, with larger cards printed on a heavier card stock. Additionally, many of the cards' other components have also been upgraded.

The premium edition supports up to eight players. While the game is identical to the first edition when played with up to four players, there are sixteen additional new cards for games with five or more players. These cards include nine new roles to the game alongside three additional Guards featuring new artwork. Below is the list of cards in the premium edition:

Card	Strength	Count (2-4 Players)	Count (5-8 Players)	Effects
Assassin	0	0	1	Does nothing when played, but if the player has this card in their hand, they can reveal it when another player targets them with the Guard; that player is eliminated from the round. Afterwards, this card is discarded and the player draws a new hand.
Jester	0	0	1	Player may give another player the Jester token. If that player wins the current round, the player who gave them the Jester token also wins an Affection Token.
Guard	1	5	8	Player must choose another player and say a number other than 1. If the chosen player's hand contains a card with the strength matching that number, that player is eliminated from the round.
Cardinal	2	0	2	Player chooses any two players (including themselves) and the chosen players trade hands. The player may then look at the chosen player's hand if they chose to trade hands themselves.
Priest	2	2		Player may privately see another player's hand.
Baron	3	2		Player may choose another player and privately compare hands. The player with the lower strength-numbered card is eliminated from the round.
Baroness	3	0	2	Player may privately see up to two other players' hands.
Handmaid	4	2		Player cannot be affected by any other player's cards until their next turn.
Sycophant	4	0	2	Player may choose another player as the target for the next card played targeting an opponent.
Count	5	0	2	If the player has played or discarded this card and remains in play until the end of the round, they add one to the strength of the card in their hand.
Prince	5	2		Player may choose any player (including themselves) to discard their hand and draw a new one.
Constable	6	0	1	If the player has played or discarded this card and is eliminated before the end of the round, they win an Affection Token.
King	6	1		Player may trade hands with another player.
Countess	7	1		Does nothing when played, but if the player has this card and either the King or the Prince in their hand, this card must be played immediately.
Dowager Queen	7	0	1	Player may choose another player and privately compare hands. The player with the higher strength-numbered card is eliminated from the round.
Princess	8	1		If the player plays or discards this card for any reason, they are eliminated from the round.
Bishop	9	0	1	Player may choose another player and say a number. If the chosen player's hand contains the card with the strength matching that number, the player who played the Bishop wins an Affection Token immediately (but the round does not end). If the guess is correct, the chosen player must discard their hand and draw a new one. At the end of the round, this card beats all other cards except the Princess.

== Second Edition ==
A second edition of Love Letter was released in 2019 with new artwork and the addition of five cards to support up to 6 players. This edition carries over all the cards from the original version and adds two new roles, Spy and Chancellor. Additionally, the strength values of the King, the Countess and the Princess are all increased by one to 7, 8 and 9 respectively. This allows the Chancellor to slot in at strength 6, while the Spy is assigned the previously unused strength 0. An additional Guard card has also been added. Below is the list of cards in the second edition:

Card	Strength	Count	Effects
Spy	0	2	Does nothing when played, but if the player is the only one still in play who has played or discarded this card by the end of the round, they gain an additional favor token.
Guard	1	6	Player may choose another player and name a card other than the Guard. If the chosen player's hand contains the same card as named, that player is eliminated from the round.
Priest	2	2	Player may privately see another player's hand.
Baron	3	2	Player may choose another player and privately compare hands. The player with the lower-value card is eliminated from the round.
Handmaid	4	2	Player cannot be affected by any other player's cards until their next turn.
Prince	5	2	Player may choose any player (including themselves) to discard their hand and draw a new one.
Chancellor	6	2	Player may draw two cards from the deck, then choose one of the three cards in their hand to keep, and place the other two at the bottom of the deck in any order.
King	7	1	Player may trade hands with another player.
Countess	8	1	Does nothing when played, but if the player has this card and either the King or the Prince in their hand, this card must be played immediately.
Princess	9	1	If the player plays or discards this card for any reason, they are eliminated from the round.

This edition can also be played in accordance with the original version by removing the five additional cards, though this only supports 2–4 players.

== List of editions ==
In addition to foreign language editions, there are many themed editions, often with unique rules not found in the original game. Below is the partial list of all known editions of Love Letter, in chronological order of release:

Name	Date	Publisher	Language	Notes
Love Letter	2012	Kanai Factory	Japanese	The original edition of the game.
Love Letter	2012	AEG	English	The first English-language edition of the game.
Love Letter: Legend of the Five Rings Edition	2014	AEG	English	Themed, new art, identical rules to the original game.
Love Letter: Wedding Edition	2014	AEG	English	Wedding-themed version of the game with corresponding art. Made specifically for wedding receptions and can only be ordered directly from the publisher.
Big Love Letter	2014	Pegasus Spiele	German	"Postcard expansion" explaining how to use 2 sets of the base game to play with up to 8 players.
Munchkin Loot Letter	2014	AEG	English	Themed, identical rules to the original game. Includes one new card for Munchkin itself.
Letters to Santa	2014	AEG	English	Christmas-themed edition, featuring characters such as Santa Claus, snowmen, and reindeer.
Love Letter: The Hobbit: The Battle of the Five Armies	2015	AEG	English	Themed, 17-card tie-in for the 2014 film The Hobbit: The Battle of the Five Armies. Two notable changes from the original game include the addition of "The One Ring" card and a 'Baron' card with different effects.
Love Letter: Batman	2015	AEG	English	Batman-themed version with a single new rule.
Land of the Lustrous Card Game: "Love Letter"	2015	Kanai Factory	Japanese	Themed with some rules changes and new cards, included with the special edition release of volume 4 of the manga.
Adventure Time: Love Letter	2015	AEG	English	Themed with two new rules.
Star Wars: Secret Invasion (Russian: Звёздные войны: Тайное вторжение)	2015	Hobby World	Russian	Themed, with 17 cards.
Love Letter: Premium Edition	2016	AEG	English	Upgraded and expanded version of the game that supports up to eight players.
Archer: Once You Go Blackmail...	2016	AEG	English	Themed TV tie-in.
Harap Alb Continues: A Love Letter Game (Romanian: Harap Alb Continuă...: un joc Love Letter)	2016	cutia.ro	Romanian	Themed, based on the character of Harap Alb.
Osomatsu-san Love Letter Board Game	2016	Arclight	Japanese	Themed Mr. Osomatsu edition. Has a few notable rules modifications.
Love Letter: Erweiterung	2017	Pegasus Spiele	German	Expansion that adds 10 new characters.
Lovecraft Letter	2017	AEG; Z-Man Games	English	Themed, based on Lovecraft's Cthulhu Mythos. Introduces new alternative set of cards based on "insanity" powers. Re-released by Z-Man Games in 2021 with no significant changes.
Love Letter from Yozakura	2018	Kanai Factory	Japanese	Themed, included with the limited edition release of volume 22 of the manga.
Pummeleinhorn: The Super Cookie (German: Pummeleinhorn: Der Superkeks)	2018	Pegasus Spiele	German	Themed, based on Pummeleinhorn (Chubby Unicorn).
Chief Arino's Love Letter	2019	Arclight	Japanese	Themed, based on GameCenter CX, featuring Shinya Arino from Japanese comic duo Yoiko.
Love Letter Second Edition	2019	Z-Man Games	English	Updated art and five additional cards to support up to 6 players.
Witch Hat: Magic Test	2019	Arclight	Japanese	Themed, included with the special edition release of volume 5 of the manga.
Love Letter: Sender	2020	Z-Man Games	English	Themed, free print-and-play online dating April Fools' Day edition for April Fools' Day.
Touhou Bomb Letter: Delivery Barrage!	2020	Arclight	Japanese	Themed, adds 3 new types of cards.
Danganronpa: Despair Love Letter	2020	Arclight	Japanese	Themed Danganronpa tie-in, with new rules based on "Hope" and "Despair".
Infinity Gauntlet: A Love Letter Game	2020	Z-Man Games	English	Themed Marvel Universe tie-in, with team-based gameplay rules pitting one player against the rest.
Love Letter: Princess Princess Ever After	2021	Renegade Game Studios	English	Themed, based on the novel series by Kay O'Neill, with a single new rule revolving around the 'Chancellor' card.
Star Wars: Jabba's Palace – A Love Letter Game	2022	Z-Man Games	English	Themed, with new rules based on the opposing factions.
Love Letter 2nd Edition	2022	Arclight	Japanese	Second Japanese-language edition of the game.
Love Letter: 10th Anniversary Edition	2022	Arclight	Japanese	Limited edition of the game.

== Awards won ==
Love Letter has received the following awards:

- 2014 Deutscher Spiele Preis, 4th place
- 2014 Spiel des Jahres recommended
- 2014 Origin Awards Best Traditional Card Game
- 2014 Guildbrikken Best Family Game
- 2014 Fairplay A la Carte
- 2013 Golden Geek Best Party Board Game
- 2013 Golden Geek Best Innovative Board Game
- 2013 Golden Geek Best Family Board Game
- 2013 Golden Geek Best Card Game
- 2012 Japan Boardgame Prize Voters' Selection
- 2012 Dice Tower Best Family Game
- 2012 Origins Award for Best Traditional Card Game
