= Pegasus Spiele =

German board game company

Coordinates: 50°19′10″N 8°44′58″E

Pegasus Spiele Verlags – und Medienvertriebsgellschaft mbH
- Type: GmbH
- Industry: Board game publishing and distribution
- Founded: 1993 in Friedberg, Germany
- Founder: Karsten Esser; Andreas Finkernagel
- Headquarters: Friedberg
- Key people: Kartsen Esser (CEO); Andreas Finkernagel (CEO)
- Number of employees: 58 (2023)
- Subsidiaries: Pegasus Spiele North America
- Website: pegasus.de

Pegasus Spiele Verlags – und Medienvertriebsgellschaft mbH (transl. Pegasus Games Publishing and Media Distribution Company mbH) is a German board game publisher and distributor. The company was founded in 1993 by Karsten Esser and Andreas Finkernagel in Friedberg, Germany, and has remained there ever since. The company has won 10 Spiel des Jahres awards and published or distributed over 5,000 games. Pegasus also has a distribution branch in Minneapolis, Minnesota, United States.

== History ==
=== 1993–2020 ===
Pegasus Spiele was founded by two friends, Karsten Esser and Andreas Finkernagel, in 1993 as a fantasy shop in downtown Friedberg, Germany. Finkernagel has said that he was inspired by his English teacher to start a board game company. The founders, 19 and 21 at the time, had dropped out of college to establish the store. The original store was in a location vacated by their parents, next to the former Joh department store. The founders also started a fantasy club, Die Gemeinschaft des Rings (transl. The Community of the Ring), and published the gaming magazine Der Ringbote (transl. The Ring Messenger). The business first evolved into a game wholesaler, and in 1994, Pegasus expanded into publishing. Their first published game was GURPS, a pen-and-paper role-playing game (RPG). Pegasus adopted the collectible card game Magic: The Gathering early, being one of its first distributors for 4 years. The company hosted Germany's first Magic championship in Friedberg.

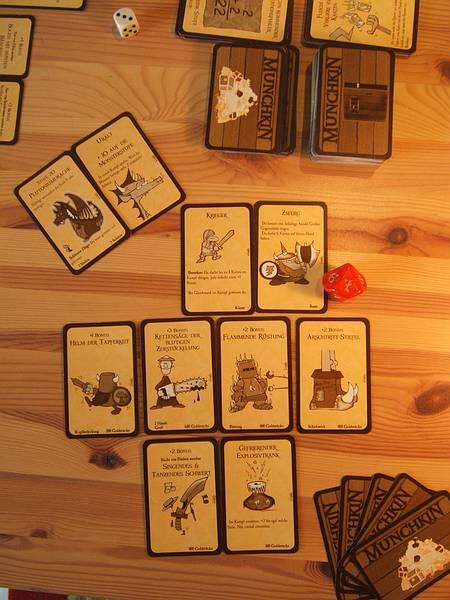
Munchkin (2003), a bestseller for Pegasus

The game Munchkin, published in 2003, contributed greatly to the company's growth in the 2000s and remains the company's bestseller. Pegasus began publishing the cooperative game Pandemic in 2008, which Esser described as a "game changer" for the company. They received their first Spiel des Jahres nomination in 2009 for Pandemic and their first win in 2012. Pegasus had to relocate their store several times for space, but wanted to remain in Friedberg. The company first moved to the western industrial park, but after running out of room again, they built a new building in the southern industrial park in 2014. In 2018, the publisher entered into a licensing agreement with Games Workshop for Talisman.

=== 2020–present ===
During the coronavirus pandemic in 2020, sales of Pegasus games boomed as families began playing more games. That year, the company restarted publishing Der Ringbote, now as an official magazine of the company. In 2021, Pegasus opened its North America branch in Minneapolis, Minnesota, which now operates as a subsidiary. For Friedberg's 800th anniversary, the company released a game based on Love Letter, The Tsar is Coming, for the city. This game was inspired by Tsar Nicholas II's 1910 visit to Hesse. The company's first original development to win the Spiel des Jahres was Dorfromantik: The Board Game (2022).

For a few months in 2023, Pegasus operated a pop-up store in downtown Friedberg. Also in 2023, construction started on a new adjacent building, dubbed "Pegasus 2". The expansion, completed in April 2024, includes new buildings and doubled the business's capacity, costing seven figures to build. Pegasus participates in the "Get to the Center" downtown initiative (German: Ab in die Mitte) as well as the Bad Nauheim- and Friedberg Plays festivals. Trade disruptions during the second Trump government impacted Pegasus both ways; devaluation in currencies benefited the company financially while uncertainty made foreign retailers hesitant to buy games. As of April 2023, Pegasus employs 58 people. Both Esser and Finkernagel remain as joint CEOs of the company. Esser primarily manages finances while Finkernagel manages marketing and sales, although they collaborate on other aspects of the company. In 2024, Finkernagel stated that Pegasus has a brand awareness of 17% in Germany. As of October 2025, Pegasus produces 90% of its products in China. Pegasus uses an alliance system to cooperate with smaller publishers. The company has distribution or licensing agreements with Games Workshop, Deep Print Games, and others.

== Games ==
Pegasus's first game was GURPS, which they published in 1994. They also distributed the popular card game Magic: The Gathering for four years before losing its rights. The publishing of Munchkin (2003) and Pandemic (2008) led to significant growth for the company. Other successful games include Kingdomino, Azul, MicroMacro, and Dorfromantik.

As of 2023, Pegasus has 5–6,000 games in their catalogue, although not all are published by Pegasus, just distributed. Pegasus publishes about 500 games themselves. The company makes around €30–35 million in revenue per year and sells about 1 million games per year. On average, a Pegasus sells 3,000 copies of a game. As of 2024, Pegasus only directly develops family games, enthusiast games ("Kennerspiele"), and card games with designers. Pegasus also publishes RPGs and fantasy books. The company releases 100–150 games per year on average that they add to their catalogue.

As of 2025, the company has won 10 Spiel des Jahres awards for its games in total. In 2025, Frankfurter Allgemeine Zeitung reported that "no other publisher has received more awards since 2014" than Pegasus Spiele. Games that win the Spiel des Jahres receive a significant boost in sales.

=== Spiel des Jahres awards and nominations ===
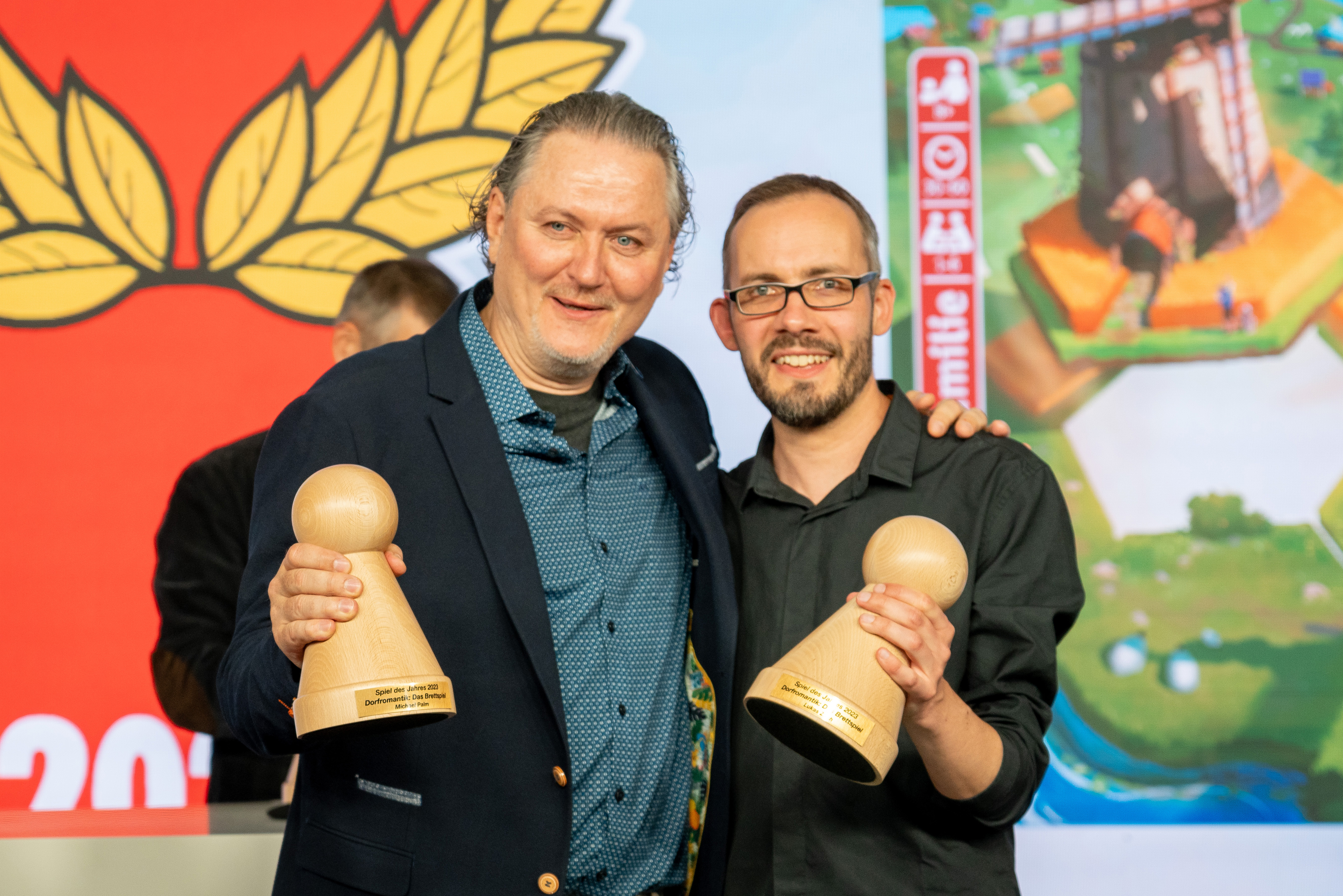
The designers of Pegasus-published Spiel des Jahres winner Dorfromantik: The Board Game holding their trophies

Title	Year	Category	Result	Notes
Pandemic	2009	Spiel des Jahres	Nominated	In collaboration with Z-Man Games
Village	2012	Kennerspiel des Jahres	Won	In collaboration with eggertspiele
Camel Up	2014	Spiel des Jahres	Won	In collaboration with eggertspiele
Istanbul	2014	Kennerspiel des Jahres	Won	
Rococo	2014	Kennerspiel des Jahres	Nominated	In collaboration with eggertspiele
Love Letter	2014	Spiel des Jahres	Recommended	
Guildhall	2014	Kennerspiel des Jahres	Recommended	
Kingdomino	2017	Spiel des Jahres	Won	
Azul	2018	Spiel des Jahres	Won	By Plan B Games (now Next Move Games) but distributed by Pegasus Spiele
MicroMacro: Crime City	2021	Spiel des Jahres	Won	In collaboration with Edition Spielwiese
Dragomino	2021	Kinderspiel des Jahres	Won	Childrens' version of Kingdomino (2017 winner)
Aeon's End	2021	Kennerspiel des Jahres	Recommended	In collaboration with Frosted Games and Indie Boards & Cards
Point Salad	2021	Spiel des Jahres	Recommended	In collaboration with AEG
Living Forest	2022	Kennerspiel des Jahres	Won	
Dorfromantik	2023	Spiel des Jahres	Won	
Bomb Busters	2025	Spiel des Jahres	Won	In collaboration with Cocktail Games
Isla a la Vista/Käpt’n Kuck	2025	Kinderspiel des Jahres	Recommended	In collaboration with Mercurio
