= Star Birds =

2025 video game

- Logo
- Developers: Toukana Interactive; Kurzgesagt
- Release: 10 September 2025 (early access)

Star Birds is a 2025 factory simulation and resource management game based on asteroid mining developed and published by Toukana Interactive in collaboration with Kurzgesagt. The game released in early access on 10 September 2025.

== Development ==
In March 2024, Toukana announced a video game collaboration with Kurzgesagt, a German animation studio. The game, originally codenamed "Project Mango", was revealed as Star Birds on 9 June at the PC Gaming Show. The two studios first met in 2022 at Gamescom. The art style of Star Birds resembles Kurzgesagt's animation. The game was released in early access on Steam on 10 September 2025. The full release is expected to take between 6–12 months.

== Gameplay ==
A screenshot of Star Birds gameplay during the alpha stage of development

The protagonists of the game are the birds often found in Kurzgesagt videos. The birds are trying to expand an empire and make new resources. The game's theme is asteroid mining, and players gather resources from different asteroids to use in factories. Players construct networks to process resources in factories in order to complete quests. Asteroids are procedurally generated, and each asteroid only has a limited area to build, so players also have to manage space for efficiency. Much of the challenge comes from the placing of pipes, which cannot cross over each other. Once all quests are completed, the birds move onto another star system and begin a new series of quests on new asteroids. Each star system has its own unique materials and resources. There is an in-game wiki to look up recipes and processes for manufacturing.

== Reception ==
PC Gamer said that the game had an easy start but quickly became very complicated. ComicBook.com praised the visuals and game design but said that the story was unengaging and disconnected from the actual gameplay. GameLuster said that the game was low-stress and "perfect entry to automation management games for newcomers".

On Steam, Star Birds received an "overwhelmingly positive" rating of 95% positive reviews. Over 200,000 people played the free Steam demo in early 2025. Toukana has announced that Star Birds will be available in autumn of 2026.

== Awards ==
Year	Award	Category	Result	Ref.
2025	Gamescom	Most Wholesome	Nominated	
2025	Indie X	Most Fun to Play	Nominated	
