= Ha Duong Ngo =

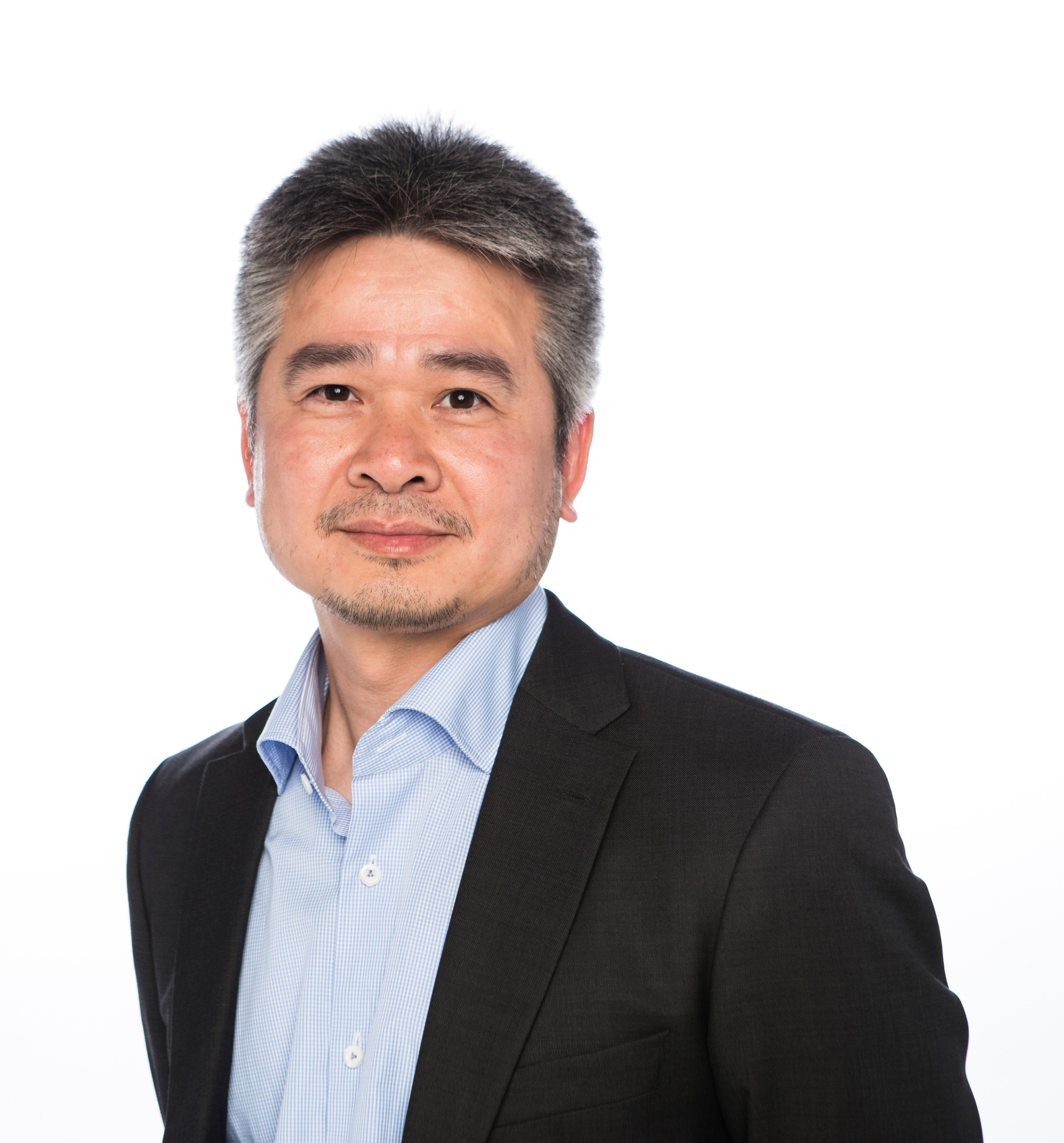
Ha Duong Ngo

Ha Duong Ngo is a research scholar in the field of Electrical Engineering/Microsystems Engineering, specifically surface-micromachined actuators in microoptical applications and silicon-on-insulator (SOI) and silicon carbide (SiC) devices for use in extreme conditions (high temperature, corrosive) and biosensing.

== Education ==
Ha Duong Ngo studied Electrical Engineering in Vietnam, Electrical Enigeering in Ukraine (UdSSR) and Microsystem technologies in Germany. He received a PhD from Technische Universität Berlin in 2006, on Micro Opto-Electro Mechanical systems (MOEMS), a special class of Micro-electro- mechanical systems (MEMS) involved in sensing or manipulating optical signals.

By 2006, Ha Duong Ngo joined the Electrical Faculty and Research Center for Microperipheric Technologies. He was the head of Microsensors and Actuator Technology Center at Technische Universität Berlin.

Presently, he is a professor at the University of Applied Sciences Berlin and a researcher of microsensors technology at Fraunhofer Institute IZM Berlin.

== Research and career ==
Professor Ngo's research interests include Microsystems Engineering, Sensor technology and development—Piezo-resistive Sensors, Gas Sensors and Silicon-on-insulator (SOI) technology and silicon carbide (SiC) technology. This work has contributed to the development of fast micro-mirrors for telescommunications and AeroMEMS sensors.

== Editorship ==
Professor Ngo has authored and co-authored more than eighty research papers and ten patents. He is currently serving as Editor for MDPI (Microsensors, Micromachines) Journals, and as associate editor at Journal on Smart Sensing and Intelligent Systems.

He is also a member of AAAS and German Society for Material Research.

== Publications ==
- Technologien der Mikrosysteme.
- Development and Characterization of a Novel Low-Cost Water-Level and Water Quality Monitoring Sensor by Using Enhanced Screen Printing Technology with PEDOT.
- A WSi–WSiN–Pt Metallization Scheme for Silicon Carbide-Based High Temperature Microsystems.
- Advanced Liquid- Free, Piezo-resistive, SOI-Based Pressure Sensors for Measurements in Harsh Environments.
