= Islanders: New Shores =

2025 video game

- Developer: The Station
- Publisher: Coatsink
- Platforms: Microsoft Windows; macOS; Nintendo Switch; PlayStation 5; Xbox Series X/S
- Release: 10 July 2025
- Genres: Casual game, city builder
- Mode: Single-player

Islanders: New Shores is a casual city-building game developed by Swedish studio The Station and published by Coatsink. It was released on 10 July 2025 for the Nintendo Switch, PlayStation 5, Xbox Series X and Series S and on Steam for Windows and MacOS. Acting as a sequel to Islanders, players must utilize buildings to place on an island to succeed. It features a high score mode and sandbox mode. It received generally positive critic reviews.

== Gameplay ==
The player is presented with several small islands. They must choose between two packs containing resources and buildings placeable throughout the island, such as houses or facilities which can perform actions such as nature generation or manipulated. If the player can exhaust the score threshold before the pack is empty, another pack is unlocked, and if done enough times, the player is allowed to move on to the next island.

In high score mode, the player collect enough points on each island to advance to the next one, and complete a total of twenty islands before reaching the end of a run. In sandbox mode, the objective is simply to make the island as pretty as possible with no tangible goal.

== Development ==
The team at Coatsink felt as if they had made a good game with Islanders, and decided to create something greater, being Islanders: New Shores. New buildings and new ways for players to earn score were added to increase depth to the gameplay. Islanders: New Shores was released 10 July 2025 for the Nintendo Switch, PlayStation 5, Xbox Series X and Series S and on Steam for Windows and MacOS.

== Reception ==
Reception

Aggregate scores
Aggregator	Score
Metacritic	83/100
OpenCritic	85% recommend

Review scores
Publication	Score
IGN	8/10
Nintendo World Report	8.5/10
Gameliner.nl	5/5
TechRaptor	6.5/10

Islanders: New Shores received generally favorable reviews according to review aggregator website Metacritic. Fellow review aggregator OpenCritic assessed that the game received strong approval, being recommended by 85% of critics.

In comparison to Islanders, Islanders: New Shores featured a "warmer and moodier" aesthetic.
