= Edition Spielwiese =

German board game publisher

Edition Spielwiese is a publisher of board and card games that is based in Berlin, Germany. The company publishes a range of games, encompassing various genres and complexity levels, sourced from both new and established designers.

== History and background ==
Edition Spielwiese was established as an extension of the Spielwiese café, a gaming venue in Berlin.

The first title published by Edition Spielwiese was Cottage Garden by Uwe Rosenberg, which was presented at Spiel in Essen in 2016. Memoarrr! by Carlo Bortolini was placed on the recommendation list for the Spiel des Jahres in 2018. Nova Luna, also by Uwe Rosenberg, was nominated for the Spiel des Jahres in 2020. In 2021, MicroMacro: Crime City received the Spiel des Jahres critics’ award.

== Published games ==
- MicroMacro: Crime City
- MicroMacro: Crime City – Full House
- Cottage Garden
- MicroMacro: Crime City – All In
- Indian Summer
