= Townscaper =

2021 video game

- Developer: Oskar Stålberg
- Publisher: Oskar Stålberg
- Platforms: Microsoft Windows; macOS; Nintendo Switch; Xbox One; Xbox Series X/S; Web
- Release: Windows, macOS, Switch; August 26, 2021; iOS, Android; October 20, 2021; Xbox One, Xbox Series X/S, Web; December 1, 2021
- Genre: City-building game
- Mode: Single-Player

Townscaper is a city builder game by Oskar Stålberg. It was released for Windows and Mac in August 2021. A port to the Nintendo Switch was released in August 2021 when the Steam version left early access. The mobile version was released in October 2021. It was later ported to Xbox One, Xbox Series X/S, and web browsers (as a demo) in December 2021. It features low poly graphics and a simple, minimalist user interface for constructive primitive groups of buildings.

== Gameplay ==
An example of a complex structure, made in the game

Townscaper takes place on a large distorted grid set in an infinite sea. This allows for towns that feel more organic and unstructured when compared to similar games that are based on regular grids.

Townscaper has no inherent objective or story and has been described by developer Stålberg as "more of a toy" than a game. Users construct an island town by placing and removing coloured blocks on a calm body of endless water. Different rules of the game dictate these blocks' appearances, with some appearing as spires and others as balconies, depending on their location and surroundings. This method of rule-based decoration allows arches, gardens, flying buildings and stairways to be created without specific user instructions.

== Development ==
Townscaper was developed by Swedish developer Oskar Stålberg, who previously worked on Bad North. Stålberg gave a talk at the IndieCade Europe 2019 event during development, showcasing some of the game's features, including terrain generation and procedural building design.

== Reception ==
Reception

Aggregate score
Aggregator	Score
Metacritic	NS: 63/100; PC: 86/100

Review scores
Publication	Score
Eurogamer	Recommended
PC Gamer (US)	80/100
TouchArcade	4.5/5

The PC edition of Townscaper received a critic score of 86% according to review aggregator Metacritic, indicating generally favorable reviews. The Nintendo Switch edition received a score of 63%, indicating a mixed or average reception.

Natalie Clayton of PC Gamer wrote: "Townscaper may not have the complexity of a Cities: Skylines, but its quaint towns littered with cobbled streets and old churches, dockyards and lighthouses feel more instantly homely than the sterile American-styled metropolises of "real" city-builders."

Christian Donlan of Eurogamer wrote: "[...] but met on its own terms, diving in when you've a few spare minutes to lay down a new neighbourhood, Townscaper is an absolutely joyous little time waster that's kept me busy since it first hit early access last year (opens in new tab). Now that it's out for real, I don't doubt it'll keep popping back in for a quick vacation for many months to come."

Tilly Lawton of Pocket Tactics wrote: "Townscaper serves up a gorgeous, illustrative art style, serene sound design, and a simple concept that’s sure to put you at ease."

== See also ==
- Islanders, a minimalist city-builder released in 2019
