= MicroMacro: Crime City =

Crime-solving hidden object game

- Manufacturers: Hard Boiled Games
- Designers: Johannes Sich
- Illustrators: Daniel Goll; Tobias Jochinke; Johannes Sich
- Publishers: Edition Spielwiese
- Publication: 2020; 6 years ago
- Players: 1–4
- Playing time: 15–45 minutes
- Age range: 8+

MicroMacro: Crime City is a cooperative tabletop crime-solving hidden object game designed by Johannes Sich and published in 2020 by Edition Spielwiese. The game received positive reviews and won the Spiel des Jahres in 2021. Three sequels released after the game's success, like MicroMacro: Crime City – Full House in August 2021.

== Gameplay ==
The team of players unfolds a poster-sized map about 45 by 30 inches (114 cm × 76 cm) with an illustrated urban area depicting characters performing ordinary daily tasks such as eating, working, or attending events. However, other characters engage in criminal activities, ranging from petty theft to murder, and it is the goal of the players acting as detectives or private investigators to solve those crimes.

The victim of the crime is depicted, but the crime is not. Each crime is associated with a case that consists of a deck of 5–12 cards with clues, the first of which describes the scene of the crime and victim. Each of the 16 cases have a difficulty rating ranging from one to five stars, and all clues for a case are labeled with a unique icon representing that case. These clues lead to different parts of the map, tracking the victim and potential perpetrator backward and forward in time.

Details such as clothing, decoration, and directionality depicted in the map can be important clues in the game, which may require a "deductive leap" at times.

== Sequels ==
MicroMacro: Crime City has spawned three sequels, each following the same basic format, but with a new city map and new cases to solve. Each sequel subtitle takes its name from a term in poker. A final product, MicroMacro: Crime City – Bonus Box was published in 2023, which utilises all four city maps simultaneously, and includes four cases which take place across all of Crime City.

- MicroMacro: Crime City – Full House was published in August 2021. It included a new 75-by-110-centimetre (30 in × 43 in) map with 16 new cases to solve. The game was described by the publisher as "more complex, sophisticated and, of course, a bit more criminal", but also included icons with each case indicating the appropriateness of the case for younger children.
- MicroMacro: Crime City – All In was published in 2022. Although once again a stand-alone package, several storylines from earlier editions continue in All In.
- MicroMacro: Crime City – Showdown was published in December 2023.
- Instagram Specials are cases available on the game's official Instagram account, available since December 2022 to users while they await future publications.

== Reception ==
MicroMacro: Crime City received positive reviews. Dicebreaker described the game as blending features from puzzle books such as Where's Wally? and mystery-solving board games such as Sherlock Holmes: Consulting Detective. In a review for ICv2, William Niebling commended the box cover art implementing a "sample mini-mystery" as a "brilliant idea" that would enable potential customers in a shop to "experience what the game offers before buying". He also stated that the game would benefit from having included its own tokens for marking sites on the map, for example tiddly-winks, instead of players having to source their own.

The game was also commercially successful, and print runs repeatedly sold out for eight months after its release. From late 2020 to mid-February 2021, shipments of the game were delayed or halted as a result of the COVID-19 pandemic.

== Awards ==
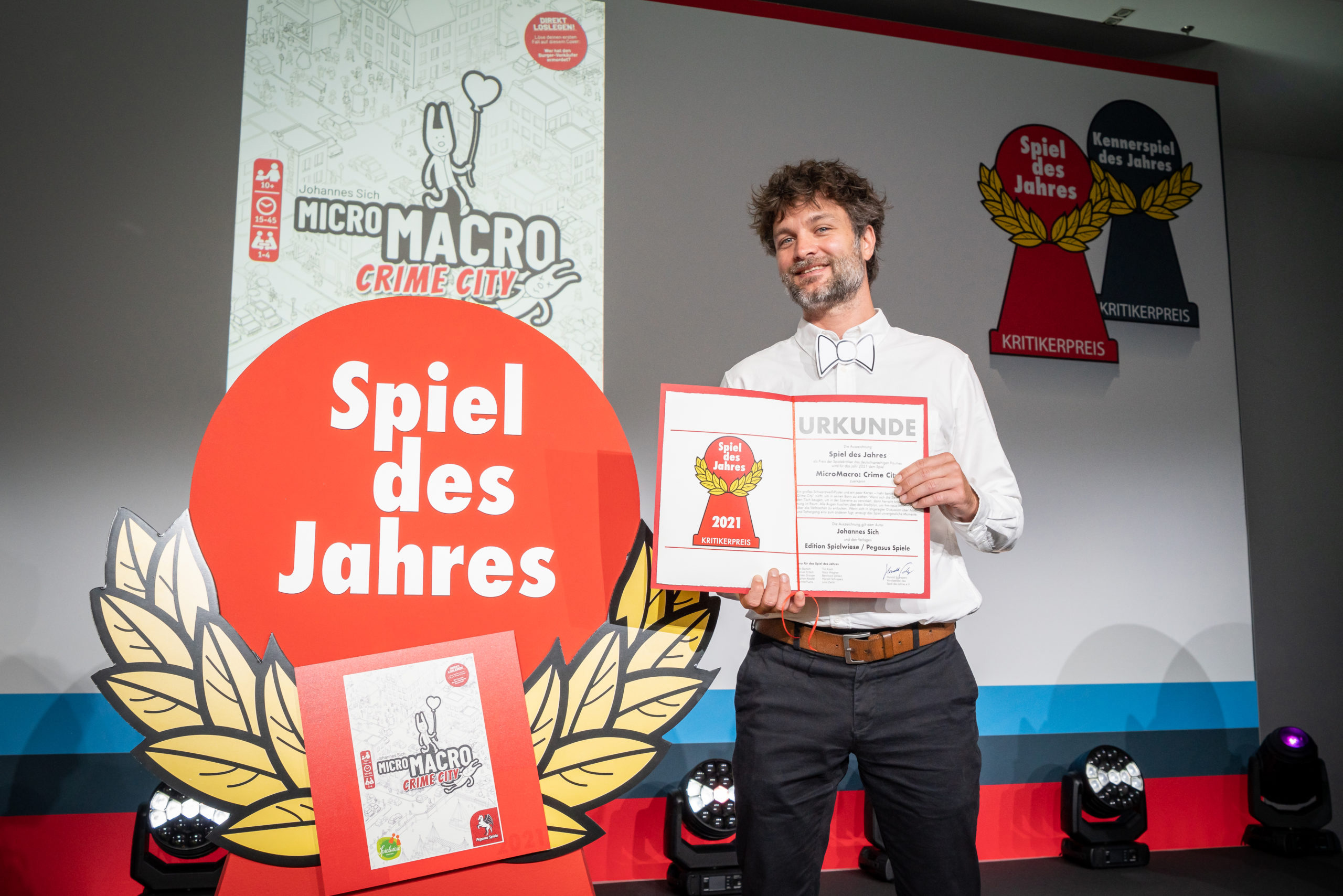
MicroMacro: Crime City receiving the Spiel des Jahres award in 2021.

MicroMacro: Crime City won the 2021 Spiel des Jahres award and the L'As d'Or Jeu de l'Année. It also won the 2020 Light Game of the Year and Innovative Game awards from the board game fansite Board Game Geek.
