= HTW Berlin =

University of applied sciences in Germany

Coordinates: 52°29′35″N 13°31′33″E

HTW Berlin – Berlin University of Applied Sciences
- Hochschule für Technik und Wirtschaft Berlin
- HTW Berlin logo
- Type: Public
- Established: 1874; 152 years ago School of Engineering and Technical Drawing 1948 Berlin Engineering School; 1991 Fachhochschule für Technik und Wirtschaft 2009 HTW Berlin
- Affiliations: EUA, HAWtech
- President: Annabella Rauscher-Scheibe
- Faculty: 294 professors (additional: 787 assistant lecturers) (2026)
- Administrative staff: 412 (2026)
- Students: 16,237 (2026)
- Location: Berlin, Germany
- Campus: Urban
- Colors: Green
- Nickname: HTW Berlin
- Website: www.htw-berlin.de

Hochschule für Technik und Wirtschaft Berlin (or HTW Berlin – University of Applied Sciences in Berlin, Germany) is the largest public University of Applied Sciences in Berlin and Eastern Germany. It has over 15,000 students and 80 programs in areas of engineering, computer science, business, culture and design. At 25.8%, HTW Berlin has one of the highest proportions of international students in Germany.

In some research-intensive and innovative departments, the HTW Berlin exercises the rights to award doctorates.

== History ==
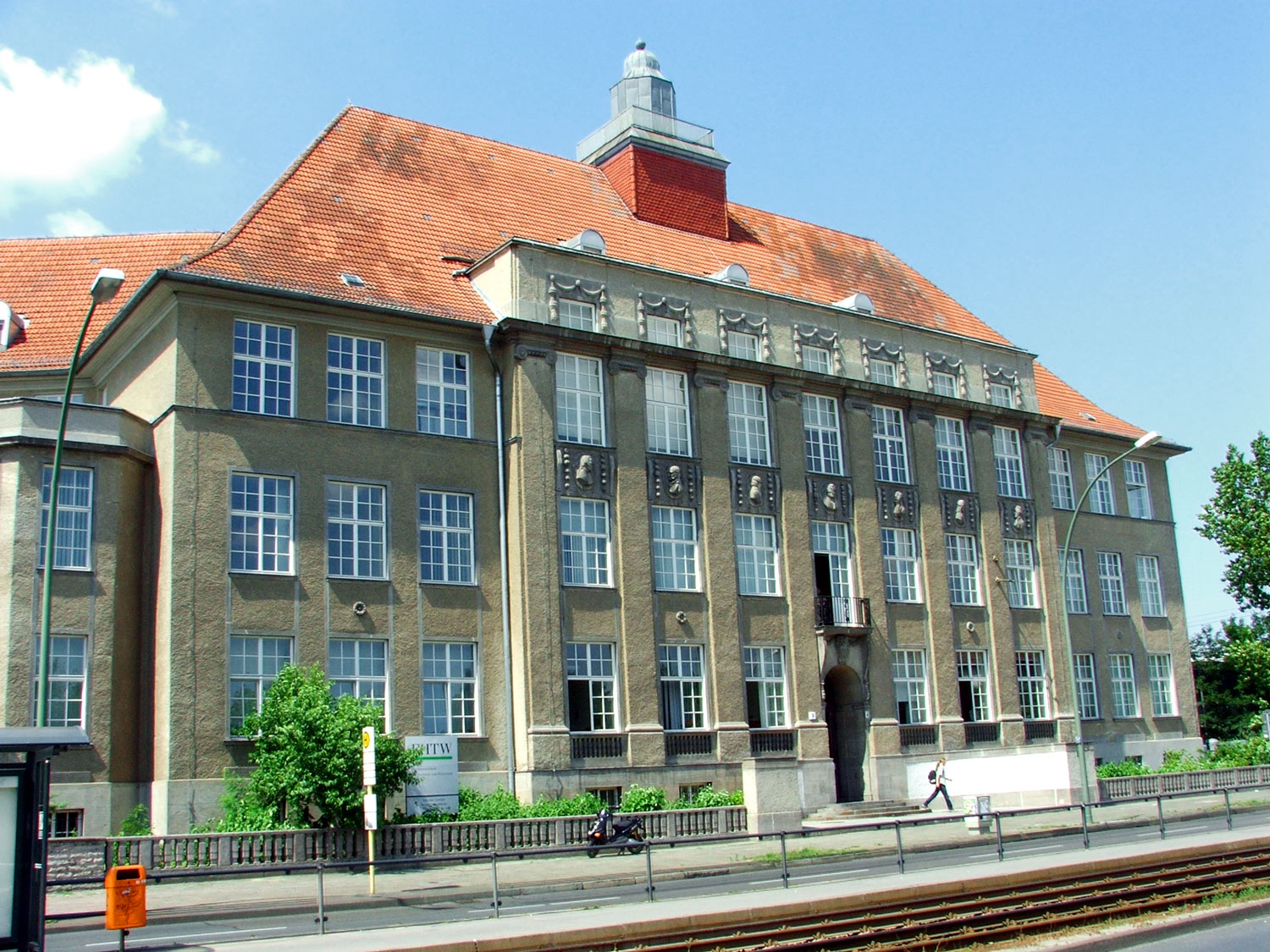
Main Building in Karlshorst

HTW Berlin is the result of the merger of various institutions.

1874 – The founding of the Fachschule für Dekomponieren, Komponieren und Musterzeichnen (School of Engineering and Technical Drawing), which later became the Berlin School of Textiles and Fashion. It then became the Engineering School of Clothing Technology, and was incorporated into the Engineering College of Berlin (Ingenieurhochschule Berlin) in 1990.

1948 – the Engineering School for Mechanical Engineering, Electrical Engineering, and Civil Engineering was founded. This was renamed the Engineering College of Berlin in 1988.

1991 – Technische Fachhochschule Berlin (TFH, now Berliner Hochschule für Technik) was charged with founding the FHTW, unifying the Engineering College and other colleges as well as the HfÖ College of Economics, located at five different places around the former East Berlin. The TFH was given responsibility for setting up the administration and hiring new teachers, although much of the staff remained with their respective schools.

1994 – FHTW was formally declared independent.

1996 – integration of the University of Applied Sciences German Telecom into the school.

2009 – name changed from FHTW to HTW Berlin and official opening of the completed Wilhelminenhof Campus.

2019 – HTW celebrated its 25th anniversary.

== Study Programs ==
The Hochschule für Technik und Wirtschaft (HTW) Berlin offers a diverse array of study programs across various disciplines, including business, engineering, computer science, design, culture, health, energy and environment, law, and construction and real estate.

Bachelor's Programs:

Master's Programs: The university offers around 40 master's programs, including consecutive master's programs that build directly on a related bachelor's degree, as well as advanced master's programs that cater to professionals seeking to enhance their qualifications.

English-Language Programs: HTW Berlin offers several programs conducted entirely in English. Examples include International Business (Bachelor and Master), Construction and Real Estate Management (Master), and International and Development Economics (Master).

== University rankings ==
In the annual university ranking published by the business magazine WirtschaftsWoche, which is based on surveys of HR managers from German companies, HTW Berlin consistently ranks among the top universities of applied sciences in business and engineering disciplines.

In 2024, the university placed first nationwide among universities of applied sciences in Business Administration, Computer Science, Industrial Engineering, and Business Informatics. Between 2021 and 2023, the university also consistently achieved top-three placements in these subjects within this category.

WirtschaftsWoche Ranking (Universities of Applied Sciences)
Subject	2024	2023	2022	2021
Business Administration	1	1	2	1
Computer Science	1	1	1	2
Industrial Engineering	1	1	2	2
Business Informatics	1	2	2	3
Mechanical Engineering	2	2	2	3
Electrical Engineering	2	4	3	6

== Locations ==
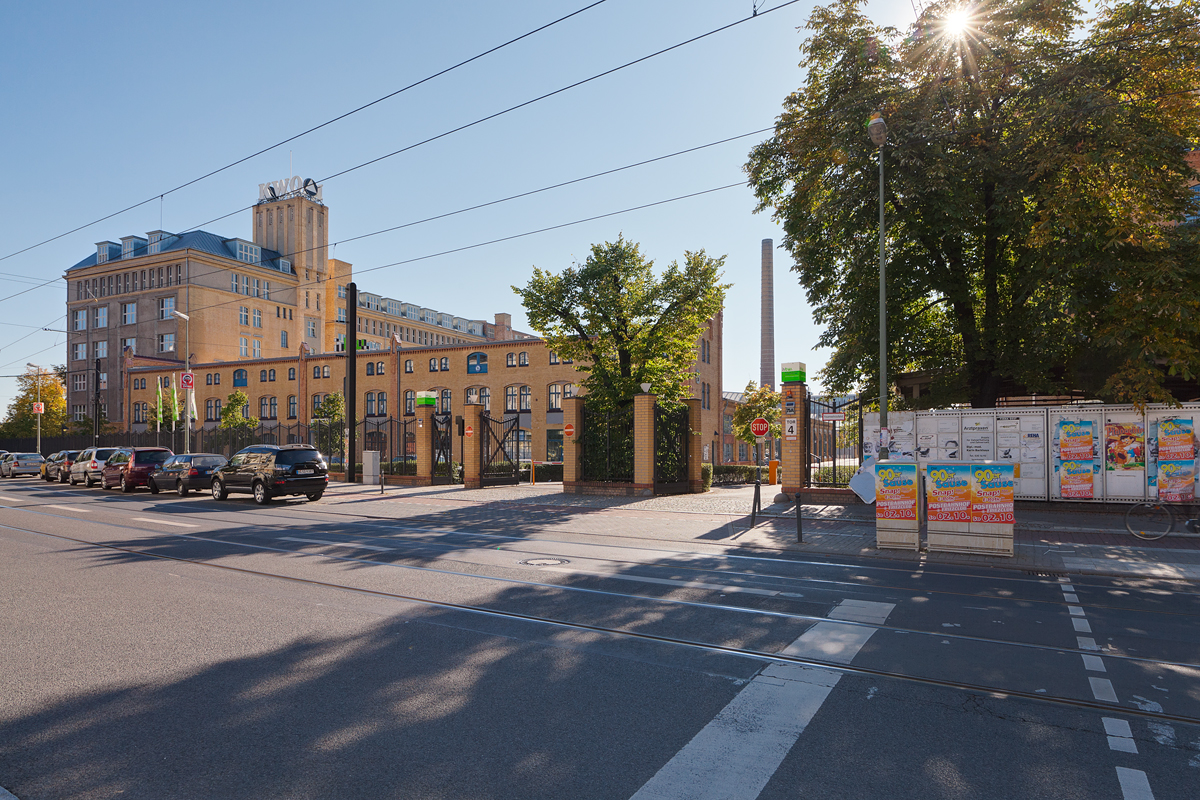
Entrance area of Wilhelminenhof campus

HTW Berlin currently has two campuses located in the eastern part of Berlin:

- Campus Treskowallee, Treskowallee 8, 10318 Berlin-Karlshorst
- Campus Wilhelminenhof, Wilhelminenhofstraße 75A, 12459 Berlin-Oberschöneweide

== Notable Professors ==
- Ha Duong Ngo - Electrical engineering professor
- Volker Quaschning - Renewable energy systems professor
