= Car game =

Game played on car journeys

Car games or road-trip games are games played to pass the time on long car journeys, often started by parents to amuse restless children. They comprise mostly of conversation games when including the driver, and also hand games when excluding the driver. They generally require little or no equipment or playing space. Some such games are designed specifically to be played while traveling (e.g. the license plate game, the Alphabet Game, or "car tag" games like Punch Buggy), while others are games that can be played in a variety of settings including car journeys (e.g. twenty questions).

A travel game is a "game designed to be easily transportable and playable in a variety of settings." It is a broader term as many car games can also be played in other vehicles like trains, boats, and planes. Travel games may also include components such as cards, travel-sized board games, or electronics. In 1860, Milton Bradley's pocket-sized "The Checkered Game of Life" is considered the U.S.'s first travel game, designed for soldiers of the American Civil War.

== Alphabet Game ==
In the alphabet game, each player has to find the letters of the alphabet among signs and other pieces of text in the environment around them, working through the alphabet in order from A to Z. Players may take turns, each turn lasting five miles of driving distance, or may play cooperatively with each other.

The game is also known as "where's the alphabet".

== Car-spotting games ==
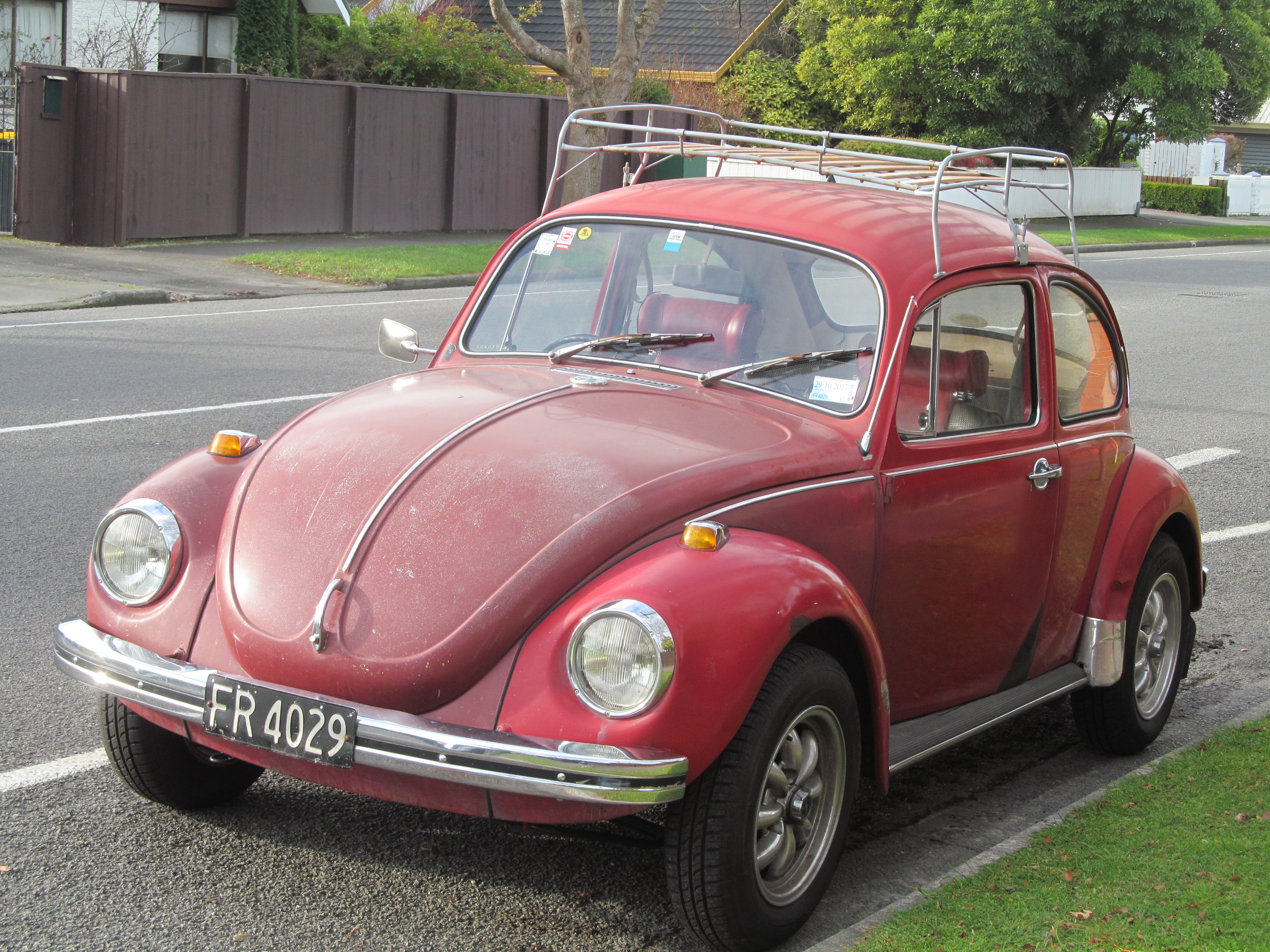
In the game of Punch Buggy, players try to spot Volkswagen Beetles

Various games involve players looking out for a particular make, model, or color of car on the road, such as "banana game", "car colors", and "find the vehicle". The game ends when the travellers reach their destination, and the person who spotted the most cars wins. Cars in a dealership lot are usually not counted.

House rules may make certain car models trigger other effects beyond or instead of awarding points, most famously in the game variant known as "Punch Buggy" where spotting a Volkswagen Beetle allows the spotter to punch another passenger.

== I Spy ==
I Spy is a common car game, one person calling out "I spy with my little eye something..." then giving a clue such as naming a letter, and others attempting to guess the object that was spied.

Players may agree that any chosen object should remain visible during the journey, rather than something that will be passed and not seen again during the journey. Players may also agree to decide if the objects will be all outside or all inside the vehicle.

The "animal game" is a variation in which the objective is to spy only animals and make their sound. If a common object is being spied, such as telephone poles, headlights, etc., then another game is to "count the..." objects. The right to score a point is often granted to the first player who spied the object, such as in "zitch dog" played in How I Met Your Mother.

== The Parson's Cat ==
The Parson's Cat, also called The Minister's Cat, is a Victorian parlour game in which players describe a cat using each letter of the alphabet. In differing variations, players may each describe the cat using a different letter (i.e., "amiable", "beautiful", "curious"), or may all describe the cat using the same letter until they cannot think of more, at which point they move on to the next letter ("amiable", "alluring", ... "antiquated", "beautiful"). In other variations, players may be required to recite all previous descriptions of the cat before adding the next adjective.

== My Cows ==
The My Cows car game can be played with any combination of rules, from complicated to simple, but at the game's core, players score points when they see a herd of cows and say "My Cows". Point modifiers can be added or subtracted from a player depending on other landmarks. For example a player may see a house of worship and say "My Church" to send your cows to be married, doubling your points or when passing a cemetery say "Your Cemetery" to eliminate an opponents cows/points. The game typically ends when you reach your destination.

Versions of this game may have regional, or even localized, variations to the name, including, "Cows, Silos, and Cemeteries" or simply "Cows on My Side".

== Sign cricket ==
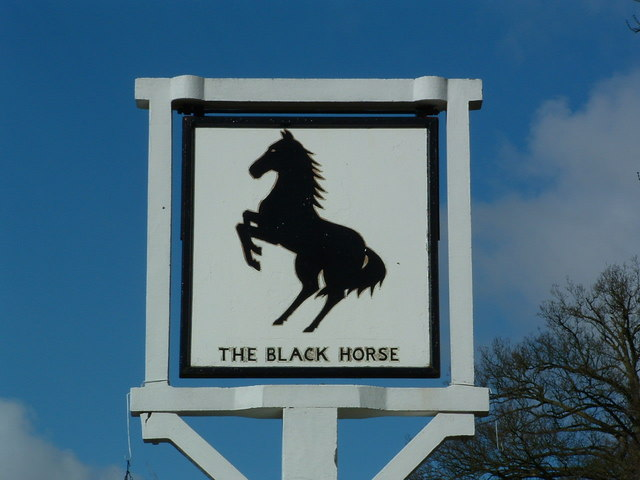
The Black Horse pub sign scores 4 points

Sign cricket is a British game where players earn points according to the numbers of legs belonging to the people or animals in the pub's name. For example, a "Horse and Groom" pub would score 6 points: 4 for the four-legged horse, plus 2 for the two-legged groom.

== Other games ==
- "Banned words". Also known as the "forbidden words" game. A variation is played in episode four of Kaguya-sama: Love Is War season 1.
- Battle of the bands
- Botticelli. Also known as "who am I?"
- Categories. Variations are "alphabet categories", and "guess that category"
- Charades
- "Counting game", a game similar to the Japanese drinking game "Takenoko Takenoko Nyoki Ki"
- Fizzbuzz
- "French toast", a guessing game where players ask if item is more like one object or another
- "Fortunately/unfortunately", a game where players alternate good and bad situations
- Ghost (game)
- Hand games (e.g. rock paper scissors)
- I packed my bag. Also known as "grocery game", or "picnic game".
- Language games
- License plate game. A version is "odd or even"
- Name That Tune and "radio game"
- Never have I ever
- Puzzles
- Quiet game. Also known as the "mouse game".
- Riddles
- Road trip bingo
- Shiritori
- Simon Says
- Six Degrees of Kevin Bacon or similarly "the movie game"
- Spelling bee
- Staring contest
- Story chain. Also known as "team storytelling". The "singing game" is a version in which players chain songs.
- Telephone game
- "Title game", a guessing game for song, movie, or book titles
- Trivia
- "Tunnels", a game where you hold your breath when driving through tunnels
- Twenty Questions, or "21 questions" (number can vary)
- Two Truths and a Lie
- Word Association
- Word chain. Some versions are "geography lesson", or "the name game".
- Would I Lie to You?, "did you hear that...?", or "while you were sleeping"
- Would you rather
- Yes, no, black, white
- Zip and bong
