= Party game =

Games played for entertainment at social gatherings

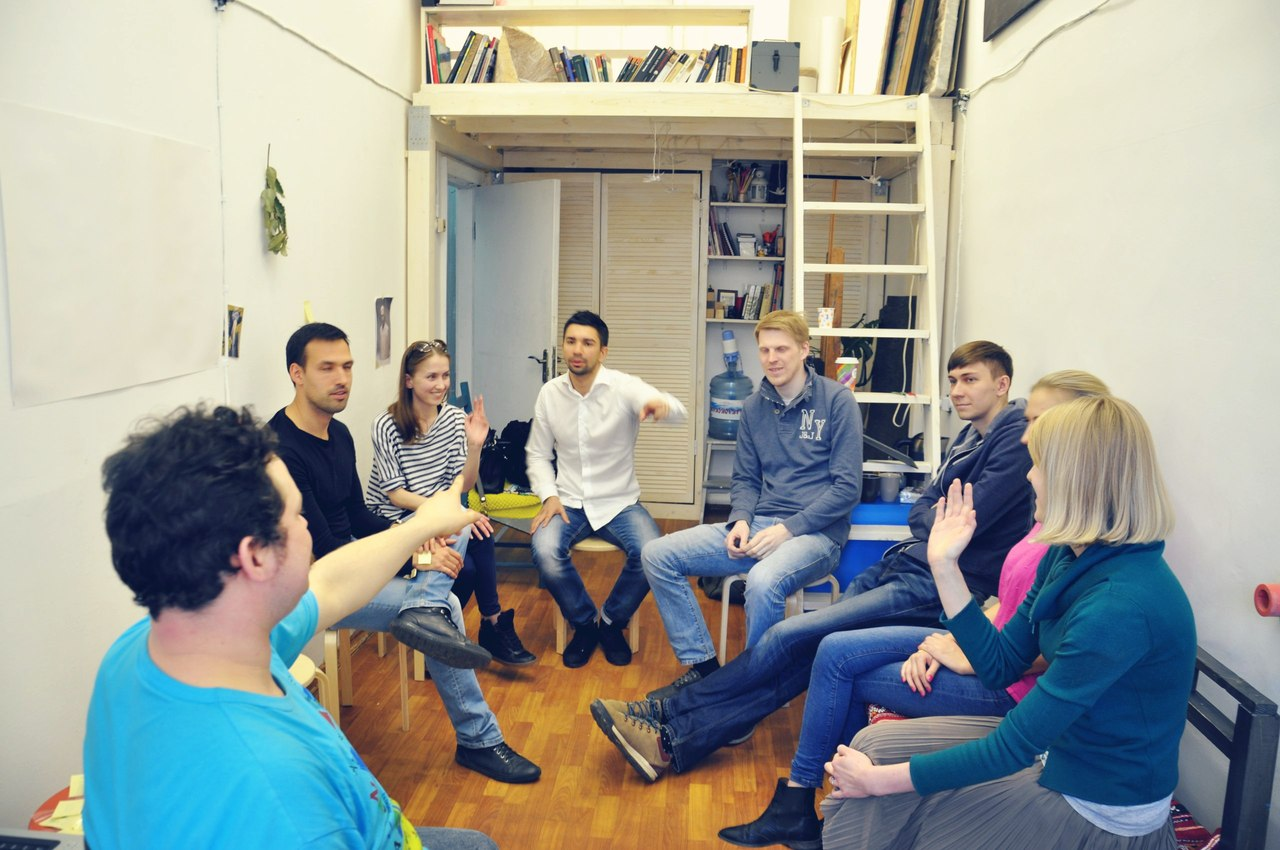
Party guests playing a game of Mafia

Party games are games that are played at social gatherings to facilitate interaction and provide entertainment and recreation. Categories include (explicit) icebreaker, parlour (indoor), picnic (outdoor), and large group games. Other types include pairing off (partnered) games, and parlour races. Different games will generate different atmospheres so the party game may merely be intended as an icebreakers, or the sole purpose for or structure of the party. As such, party games aim to include players of various skill levels and player-elimination is rare. Party games are intended to be played socially, and are designed to be easy for new players to learn.

== Characteristics ==
The characteristics of party games tend to include:

- A game can support a relatively large or undefined number of players, compared to more traditional board games or card games that require a small, set number of players. Some games, especially commercial games, have a set limit based on available equipment; others are limited by other mechanics of the game like time for each turn, while still others have no practical limit.
- Team-based play in party games is common, but not required. Games that divide players into two, three, or four roughly equal teams, such as Cranium, Charades or Pictionary tend to allow for larger total numbers of players. By contrast, other games such as Werewolf and How to Host a Murder are role-based, with each player being given a character or other role to play in the course of the game. The number of players is limited to the number of roles, but in many such games there are "generic" roles allowing for a high degree of flexibility.
- Cooperation and interaction between players is encouraged. Both team and role-based play generally encourage this social aspect to the game; games that do not encourage this interaction generally make poor party games.
- Multiple ways to play and contribute. For example, in Fictionary not everyone needs to create plausible dictionary definitions; humorous submissions are welcome. In Charades, players can actively participate in guessing without taking a turn at acting. Sports often make poor party games as limitations in a player's physical abilities may preclude participation though some party games, such as: relay racing and Red light/Green light, involve a significant physical aspect and are especially suitable for groups similar in age and ability.
- Players participate in gameplay frequently, sometimes on an impromptu basis. Games in which each player has their own independent turn generally make poor party games, especially if a turn takes a long time.
- A game should also have entertainment value for spectators. Many party games involve at least some level of humor, whether inherent in the game or introduced by players. In this way, players not taking a turn can still enjoy the gameplay, whilst party favors can embellish the party atmosphere.
- Player elimination is rare. Monopoly makes a poor party game, because bankrupt players must sit out while the remaining players continue to the game's conclusion, which can take several hours. In contrast, no matter how far behind a team is in Pictionary, all players can participate until the end.
- The amount of specialized equipment needed is not dependent on the number of players. Games such as Liar's Dice make poor party games because each player needs a cup and five dice to start the game. By contrast, Yahtzee needs only one cup and set of dice regardless of the number of players (the basic Yahtzee game does have other practical limitations).
- The game usually does not involve spending real money as a prerequisite or consequence of playing. Games that require each player to purchase consumable items or specialized equipment are usually poor party games. Casino games are a notable exception. Examples include "casino nights" with a token door charge or buy-in for charity or to defray costs and poker tournaments with a similar small buy-in.

== Common party games ==
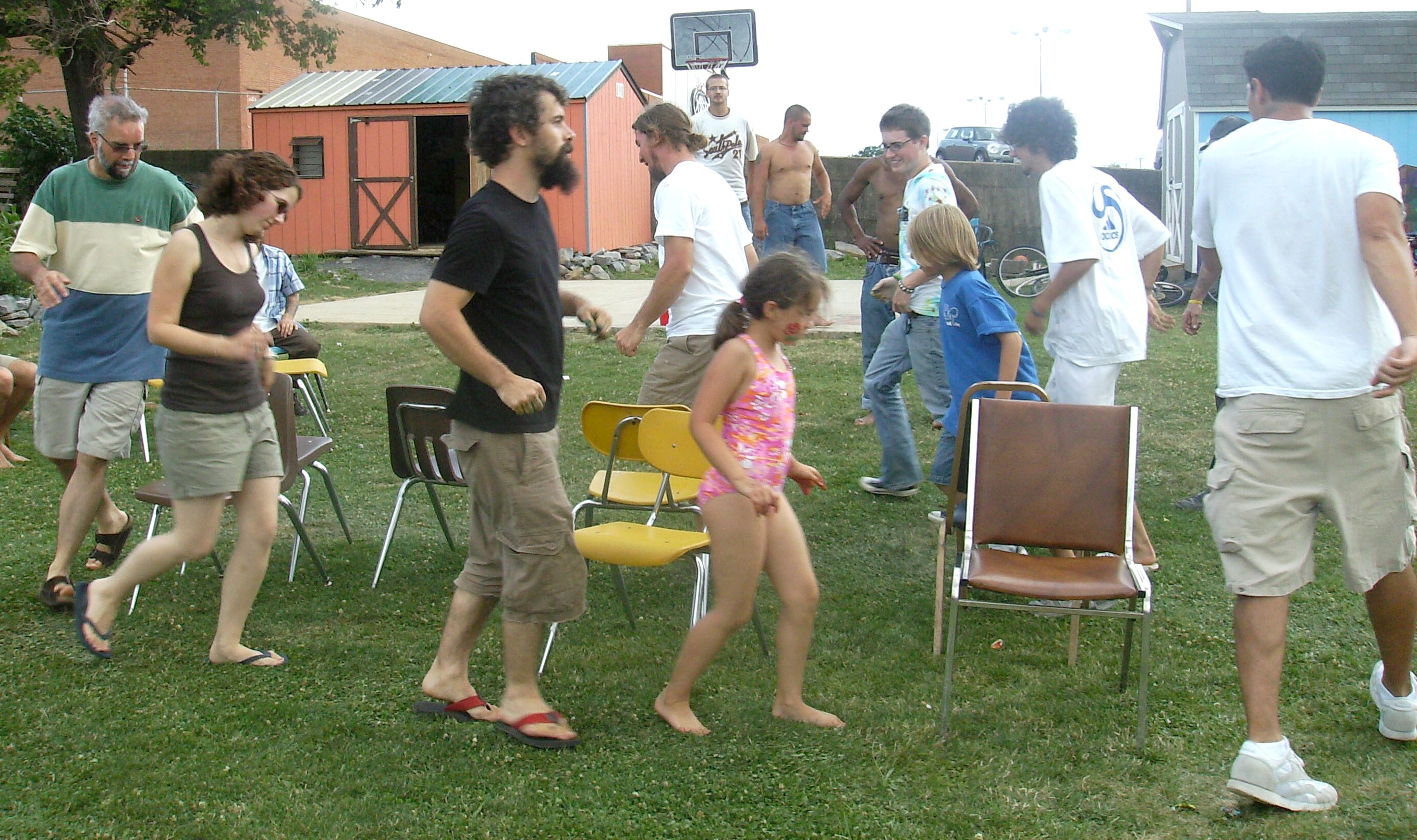
Musical chairs

- 1000 Blank White Cards
- 30 Seconds
- Apples to Apples
- Articulate
- Balderdash
- Bat a rat
- Beer pong
- Bingo
- Botticelli
- Buck buck
- Cards Against Humanity
- Catch Phrase
- Celebrity
- Charades
- Chinese whispers
- Consequences
- Couch of power
- Cranium
- Dixit
- Drinking games
- Fictionary (related to the commercial Balderdash)
- Game For Fame
- Gift Trap
- Mafia (also known as Vampire or Werewolf)
- Murder mystery games
- Musical statues
- Nerf War
- Never have I ever
- Outburst (game)
- Pat-a-cake, pat-a-cake, baker's man
- Pictionary
- Post Office (game)
- The priest of the parish
- Psychiatrist
- The Resistance
- Scattergories
- Scissors
- Scruples
- Seven minutes in heaven
- Shout about movies
- Spin the bottle
- Squeak piggy squeak
- Strip games
- Taboo
- Time's Up! (game)
- Treasure Hunt
- Trip to Jerusalem
- Trivial Pursuit
- Truth or Dare? and related games such as "Strip or Dare?" and "Drink or Dare?"
- Twenty questions
- Utter Nonsense!
- White elephant gift exchange
- Would you rather
- Zip and bong
- Zip Zap Zop
- Zoom Schwartz Profigliano

== Children's party games ==
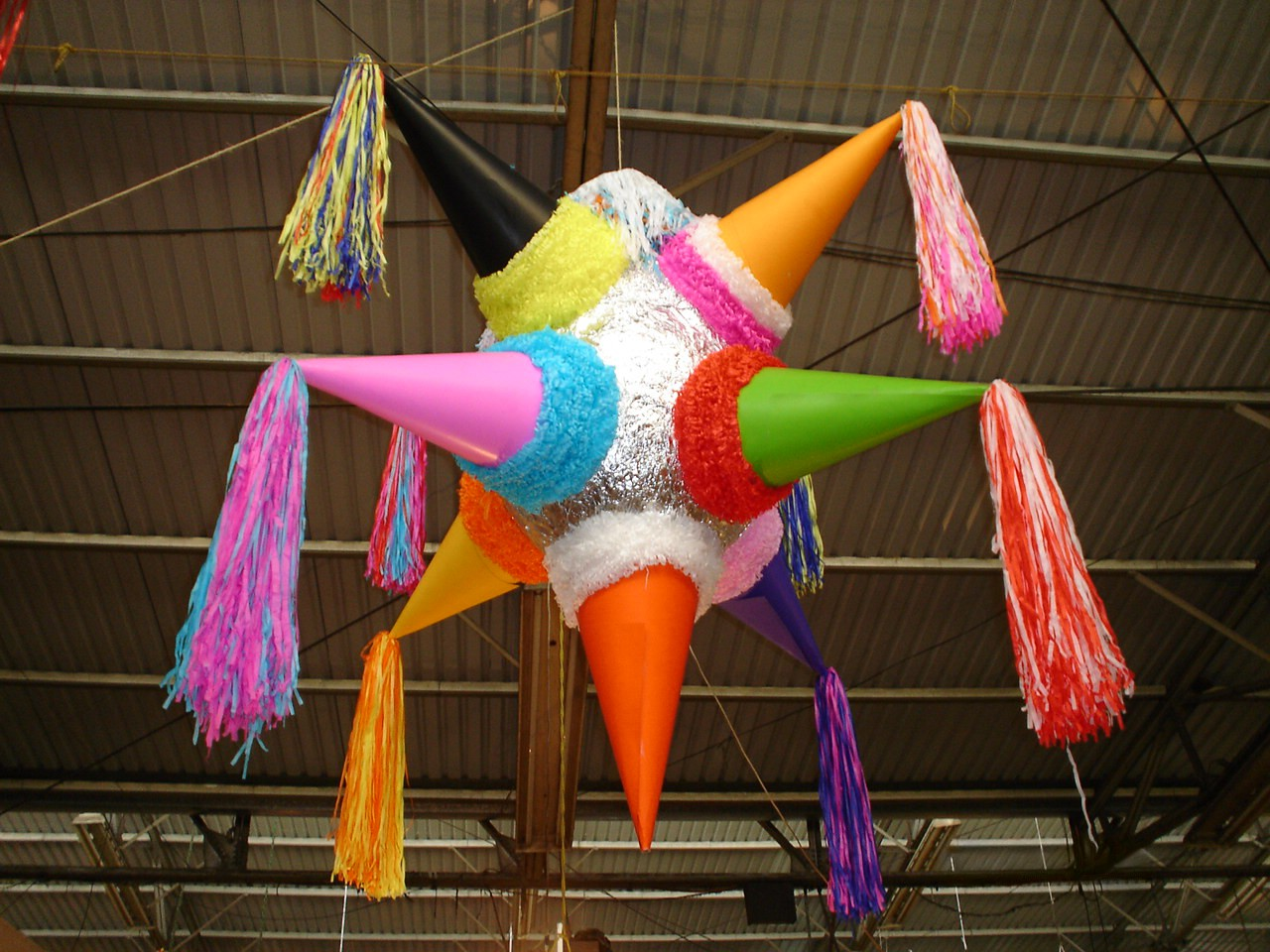
A nine-pointed star piñata

Traditional children's party games include:

- Blind man's bluff
- Duck, duck, goose
- Forty forty
- Hide and seek
- Hunt the thimble (or slipper, or other object)
- Mother May I?
- Musical chairs
- Musical statues
- Oranges and Lemons
- Pass the parcel
- Pin the tail on the donkey
- Piñata
- Poor pussy
- Rock paper scissors
- Sardines
- Sleeping lions
- The Farmer in the Dell
- Twister
- Wink murder

== Video games ==
Party video games are commonly designed as a collection of simple minigames, designed to be intuitive and easy to control, and allow for competition between many players. Some games are played on simulated game boards, like the Itadaki Street series, Mario Party series and Sonic Shuffle.

BYTE in 1981 called the Olympic sports game Olympic Decathlon (1980) "the first true party game for microcomputers". Another early example is Starpath's Party Mix.

Modern examples include Tower Unite (2016), a virtual community party game played online, and The Jackbox Party Pack series which offers minigames that can be played both online and with people in the same room.

== Large group games ==
Large group games are played by many participants and are often used as planned activities in structured environments, especially as educational activities. They are similar to party games, except that large group games are typically planned for larger numbers (perhaps even hundreds) as part of an event.

Large group games can take a variety of forms and formats.

Some are physical games such as Buck buck.

Some are modeled on the TV game show format, offering points for teams who can answer questions the fastest. Trivia-type games might have questions posed from the stage and each tabletop writing their answers to be collected and scored. Others may take on some of the qualities of Open Space environments and allow participants to wander in a less structured way.

Some are modeled on TV reality shows such as The Amazing Race or Survivor. Participants compete as individuals or in teams to complete challenges that move them towards victory in a competition spanning the entire party. The TV shows on which such parties are based are normally competitions involving elimination, so such events require significant planning to avoid exclusion or boredom.

There are also now electronic party games such as Cards Against Humanity that can be played on the phone or computer.

Group board games can take on the design of small groups of players, seated at tables of 4 to 6 people, who work together on a problem. There can be large numbers of people (and thus many tables). If properly designed, these scalable exercises can be used for small groups (12 to 20 people) as well as very large events (600 people or 100 tables).

Generally, for these larger exercises, multimedia projectors, large screens and microphones are required for instructions and communications.

A search for team building events can turn up millions of links to exercises, companies, and various offerings ranging from paintball competitions to fire walks to outdoor climbing or whitewater adventures. The impact on actual team building can vary widely - a golf outing for corporate executives does not generally accomplish much in the way of organizational improvement while a business simulation might be directly focused on linking the play of the game to issues for corporate improvement.

Holiday groups use a gift exchange party game such as white elephant gift exchange for socializing and sharing gifts. New online party games, based on these holiday games, allow larger groups to gather on the internet to save travel expenses.

== See also ==
- Card game – Game using playing cards as the primary device
- Casual game – Video game genre
- Conversation games – Type of game
- Cuddle party – Event where people cuddle in a group
- Drinking game – Game which involves the consumption of alcoholic beverages
- Minigame – Game often contained within a video game
- Parlour game – Group game played indoors
- Pub games – Game traditionally played in or outside pubs and bars
- Strip game – Game involving clothing removal
