= Smash or pass? =

Party game

Smash or pass? is a game in which players evaluate the sexual desirability of an individual, declaring whether they would hypothetically want to "smash" them (have sex with them) or "pass" (choose not to). The subject of discussion may be a celebrity, a fictional character, or an individual known personally to the players.

The game has seen spikes of popularity on the Internet, including on Facebook, YouTube, and TikTok. It has also been used as a form of sexual harassment, including through the uploading of photographs of people without their consent.

The name comes from a slang meaning of smash meaning "have casual sex", which is attested from the early 2000s. The game's terminology is also used metaphorically to evaluate things outside the sexual sphere, like food or festival performances.

== History ==
Smash or pass? originated as a party game, but has become popular on the Internet; it has been described as an internet fad. Vice News reported that the game "has mysterious origins" and speculated that it may have originated from other risqué games played by adolescents, including spin the bottle, truth or dare?, and fuck, marry, kill. The game appeared on internet forums in mid-2010, the same year in which the phrase smash or pass was first defined on Urban Dictionary.

In one version of the game, reported in 2011, teenagers uploaded photographs of themselves to Facebook so that others could evaluate their looks. In some cases, photographs were uploaded for the game without their subjects' knowledge or consent. Digital security specialists Theresa Payton and Tshaka Armstrong said the game was risky and urged parents to monitor their children's activity online. Payton called the game "sexploitation" and said that the photographs might be viewed by sexual predators. Missy Wall of Teen Contact expressed concern about how the game could affect teenagers' mental health: "When a teenager gets 'passed' that could be very detrimental to emotional health. The teen may try to get noticed and may become more risque. It is a form of cyber-bullying."

In 2014, Task & Purpose reported that "smash or pass" photographs of women in the United States military were being uploaded to Facebook without their consent, as part of a pattern of sexual harassment. The photographs sometimes attracted jokes about raping the women depicted.

Based on Google Trends data, interest in the game was low until around 2016, when searches spiked, coinciding with a rise in the game's popularity on YouTube. PewDiePie made a Smash or Pass video in 2017 which got 13 million views.

In two cases, the game was linked to specific incidents of online sexual harassment in American high schools. A 2017 qualitative study by information scientists Denise E Agosto and June Abbas reported a "Smash or Pass" Twitter account on which students at one school evaluated other students' appearances. The Twitter account was widely viewed among the student body and included "increasingly cruel" comments. When school administrators discovered the account, they had it shut down, expelled the student responsible, and prohibited students from talking about the incident. In 2019, two male high school students in DeWitt, New York, changed schools after posting a video in which they rated the sexual desirability of girls in the local area; one of their parents said that the two boys were asked to leave their school or face expulsion.

Starting in January 2022, the game became part of a trend on TikTok in which users decide whether to "smash or pass" fictional characters from TikTok character generators. Popular characters have included Marvel Universe characters, Disney characters, and cartoon parents.

The game's popularity among German speakers has led to the verb smash entering the German lexicon as smashen; in 2022 it was chosen as youth word of the year in a Langenscheidt poll.

== Reception ==
Dictionary.com called the game "the sleepover game of the internet age". Steph Panecasio of CNET said of the TikTok trend: "There's no untoward behavior, this is all in the name of good fun."

American security scholar Joan Johnson-Freese cited the game, along with Hot or Not, as examples of the objectification of women prevalent in Western society. American communication researchers Nathian Shae Rodriguez and Terri Hernandez also cited the phrase "smash or pass" as an example of objectification of women related to hegemonic masculinity.

Arielle Richards of Vice News said that "the real beauty of smash or pass is in its simplicity", but acknowledged that it "can be, and has been, misused in harmful ways". Richards compared the game to FaceMash, a predecessor to Facebook, in which users rated the appearance of female Harvard students.

== See also ==
- Conversation games
- Fuck, marry, kill
