= Yes, no, black, white =

Verbal party game

- Years active: Unknown (before 1957)
- Genres: Spoken game, party game, car game
- Players: Variable, generally 2
- Setup time: None
- Playing time: Arbitrary, generally < 5 minutes
- Chance: High
- Skills: Language skills (vocabulary), memory, deception

Yes, no, black, white is a simple verbal game for two or more players. It can also be considered as a party game and a car game. It has very few and simple rules, requires no equipment, and it's played in multiple countries around the world, primarily in Europe. The game's exact origin is unclear.

== Gameplay and rules ==
The game, in the most common setting, is played with two players. After deciding who will play the roles of a questioner and an answerer and agreeing to start the game, the questioner asks the answerer any question they wish, and the answerer must answer truthfully to that without using any of the four forbidden words: yes, no, black or white. Given the answer satisfies this rule, the questioner continues asking and the answerer answering in this manner, engaging in a conversation in which the questioner tries to trick, confuse or otherwise make the answerer have a slip of the tongue, therefore lose the game. If the answerer uses one of the forbidden words, they lose, and the two players might change roles and start a new session.

Generally the game has no preset time limits for either answers or the game session itself, but answers are expected to be given in a reasonably short amount of time. To avoid the forbidden words, the answerer may use words or phrases with a similar meaning or use circumlocutions. In any case, the reply must be verbal, for example humming an mhm instead of an expected yes isn't considered a valid answer. Usually there is an expectation that the answerer shouldn't use the same evading phrase more than three times, although keeping this in mind may present challenges without the players writing down the answers used.

== Variations ==
In German the game is known as Ja-Nein-Schwarz-Weiß ("yes-no-black-white") and in Hungarian as fekete-fehér, igen-nem ("black-white, yes-no"). Since in the Hungarian language saying "I don't know" (nem tudom) or "not sure" (nem biztos) involves saying the word for "no" (nem), these are generally considered losing answers. This technicality might affect other languages as well.

There are radio stations which integrated the game in their programming as a call-in game. The Hungarian station Class FM uses a variation of the game in their morning zoo program Morning Show. This has a one-minute time limit, while the caller and the show host they choose naturally alternates between the questioner and answerer roles, as in a real-life conversation. In this variant, the caller wins a small assortment of Class FM merchandise if they avoid using the forbidden words or they manage to make the chosen host say any of them before time runs out.

== Origins ==
Homo Ludens, a Hungarian website about verbal games, has two entries with the game's name, one describes it as a "folk game", and the other one describes a "scout" variant. Both entries cite Katalin Lázár's ethnographical work Népi Játékgyűjtemény ("Folk Game Collection"). The "scout" variant's collection date is given as 1957.

== See also ==
- Twenty Questions
