= FMK =

FMK may refer to:

- FMK Firearms, an American manufacturer of firearms founded in 2006
- Fuck, Marry, Kill, a forced choice question-and-answer game
