= Car-spotting game =

Game played during a car ride

A car-spotting game is one that is played during a car ride, especially a road trip, where occupants of a vehicle compete to be the first to spot a car of a certain description. Many variations exist around the world. The first to call a particular target either scores points which are tracked over the course of the journey, or they earn the right to lightly punch an opponent.

== Punch buggy ==
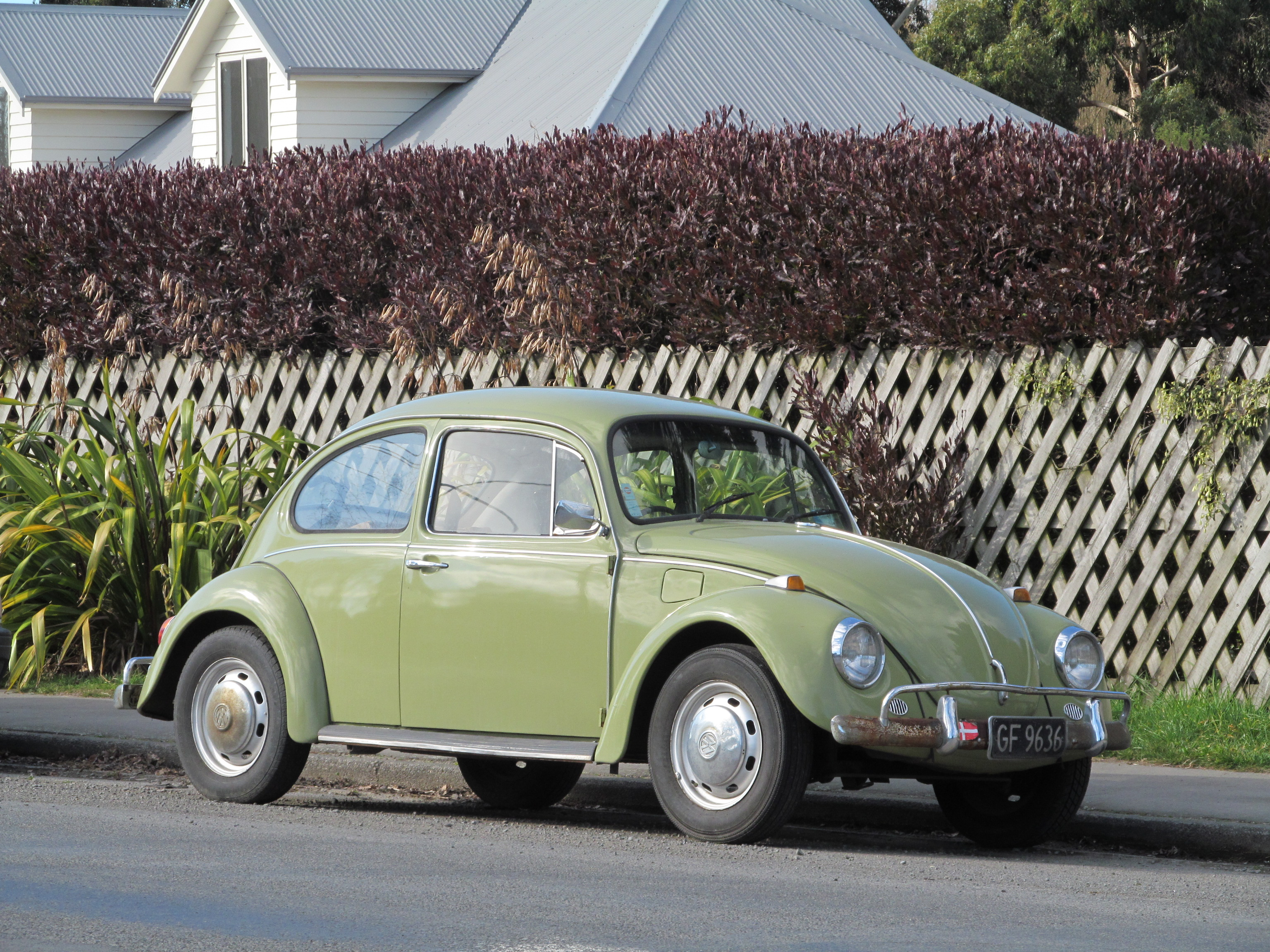
A 1972 Volkswagen Beetle

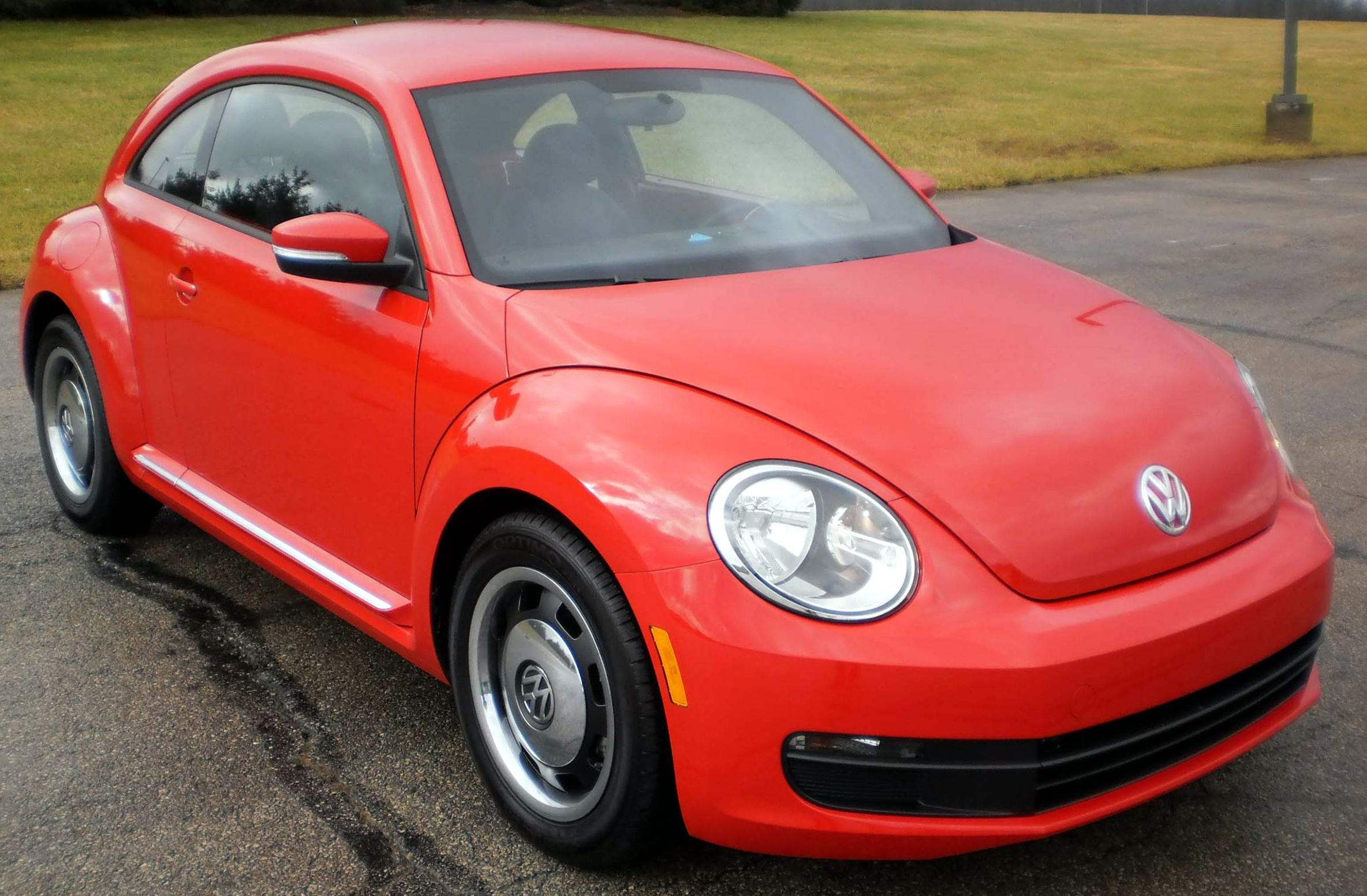
A 2012 Volkswagen Beetle

Punch buggy (also called slug bug or punch dub) is a car-spotting game where players seek Volkswagen Beetles, calling "Punch buggy!" when they do so, in reference to the Beetle's nickname, the Bug. Once a car has been spotted and called out it cannot be used by another player. Traditionally the calling player also gently punches an opponent in the arm, but the game can also be played for points: spotting a Beetle earns the player a point, but making an incorrect call means that they lose a point and will get punched 3 times and it does not count if it is in a movie or show.

The color of the Beetle is sometimes stated when it is called.

In some versions where players punch each other, a player can shout "No punch backs!" after each call. If they forget to do so, they may be immediately punched back by the player that they punched.

=== History ===
Most references about the game originate from unofficial sources and personal accounts from players. It apparently has existed since the Volkswagen's peak popularity in the 1960s.

Volkswagen ran a 2009 advertising campaign calling the game "Punch Dub", with a fictional backstory of its inventor, Sluggy Patterson. The campaign claimed that the game was started "over 50 years ago", though this is a humorous historical fiction created by the ad agency Deutsch Inc.

In 2010, Volkswagen referenced the game in a Super Bowl commercial, with blind musician Stevie Wonder punching comedian Tracy Morgan after "spotting" a red bug.

=== Variants ===
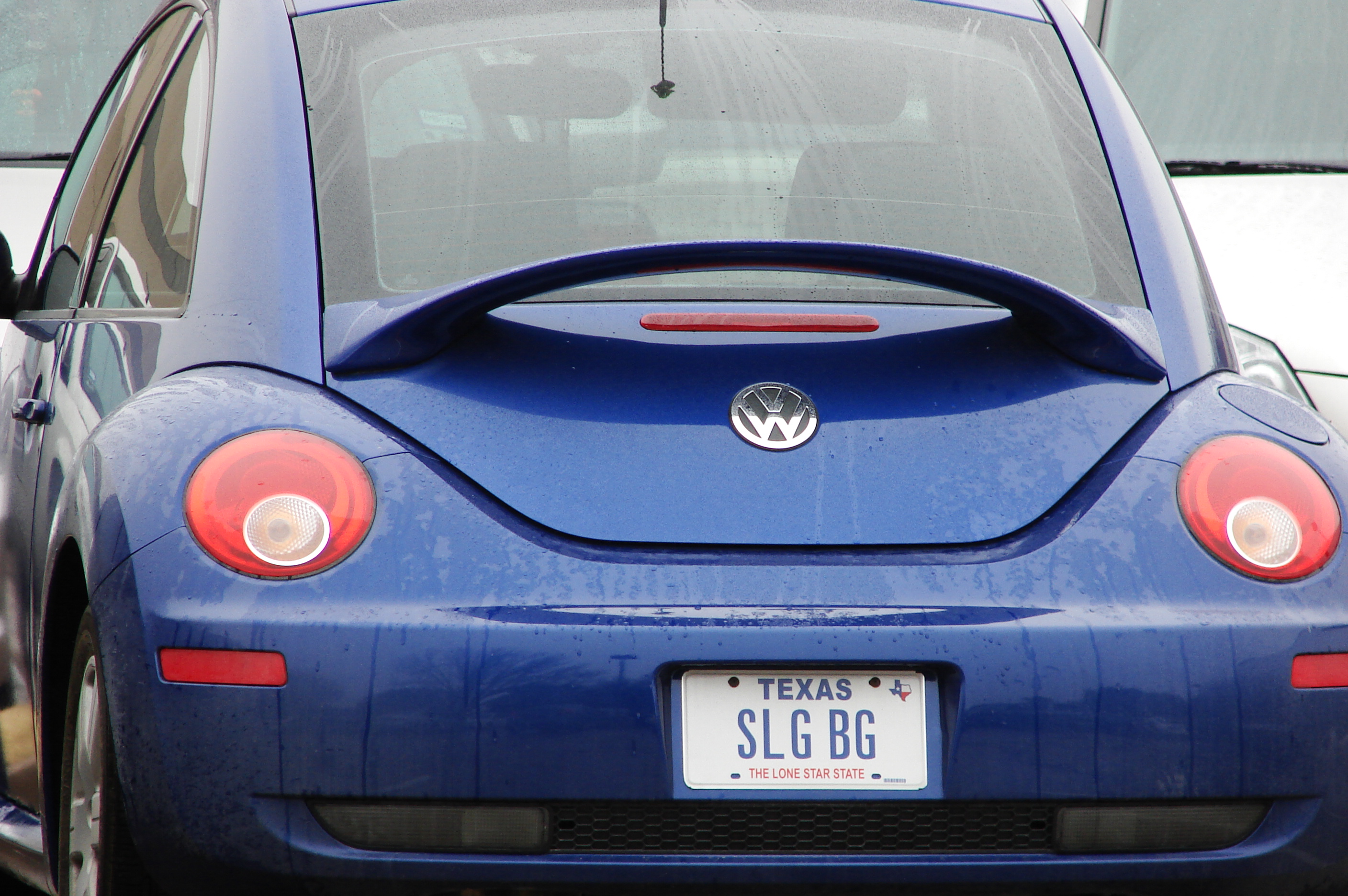
A New Beetle "slug bug"

Some variations consider the 1998–2010 Beetle and 2011–2019 Beetle invalid for game purposes, but as older models become rarer, variations may choose to include the new Beetles. Others allow "classic" Beetles to count for two punches.

In Brazil, a popular version of the game is played when a blue Volkswagen Beetle is seen. The first individual to notice it has to scream 'Fusca Azul', which stands for 'Blue Beetle', while others close their arms around their chest and say 'Fechei' (I closed it), and the person who forgets or refuses to say 'Fechei' may have their arm punched as a punishment. A Mexican variant exists, but with yellow Beetles rather than blue ones. It is stated that those rare yellow-colored Beetles could bring good luck.

== Padiddle ==
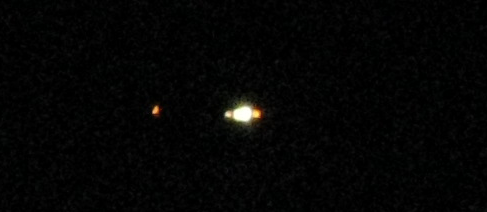
The lights of a padiddle

Padiddle (alternatively padoodle, pediddle, perdiddle) is a night driving game where players look for vehicles with a single burnt-out headlight or brake light, the word padiddle being a slang term for such a vehicle. The term popeye is also used, due to it resembling a missing or squinting eye. A car with only one taillight may be called as a padunkle.

=== Play ===
The objective is to be the first to spot a qualifying vehicle. The spotter must say "padiddle" to earn one point for a single headlight sighting, and "little dip" to earn 3 points for a single tail light sighting. Players lose 5 points for errant callouts (e.g. motorcycles or two working lights). In some groups, the spotter must simultaneously hit the ceiling of the car or hit the window glass, and in others, punch or kiss another passenger. The person with the highest score at the end of the trip is the winner. In another version, the first person to get to 3 "padiddles" is the winner and gets to make a wish.

In some variants the last member of the car to punch the ceiling loses one article of clothing. Following this style of play, the winner is the last person wearing clothes in the car. This is sometimes played in teams where every member of the losing team must remove an article of clothing.

Qualifying vehicles must be visible through the windshield of the vehicle; "padiddles" seen through a side or rear-view mirror only count for half a point. A motorcycle misidentified as a padiddle is a foul that awards the offender's partner a double hit or kiss. Players can not use their own vehicle as a point.

Fog lights do not count as a padiddle even if used as primary lights. There is no such thing as a double padiddle.

=== Other targets ===
Other calls for padiddle include padunkle or padinkle for a car with only one tail light.

One author suggests similar games with station wagons, convertibles, trucks and buses.

== Yellow car ==
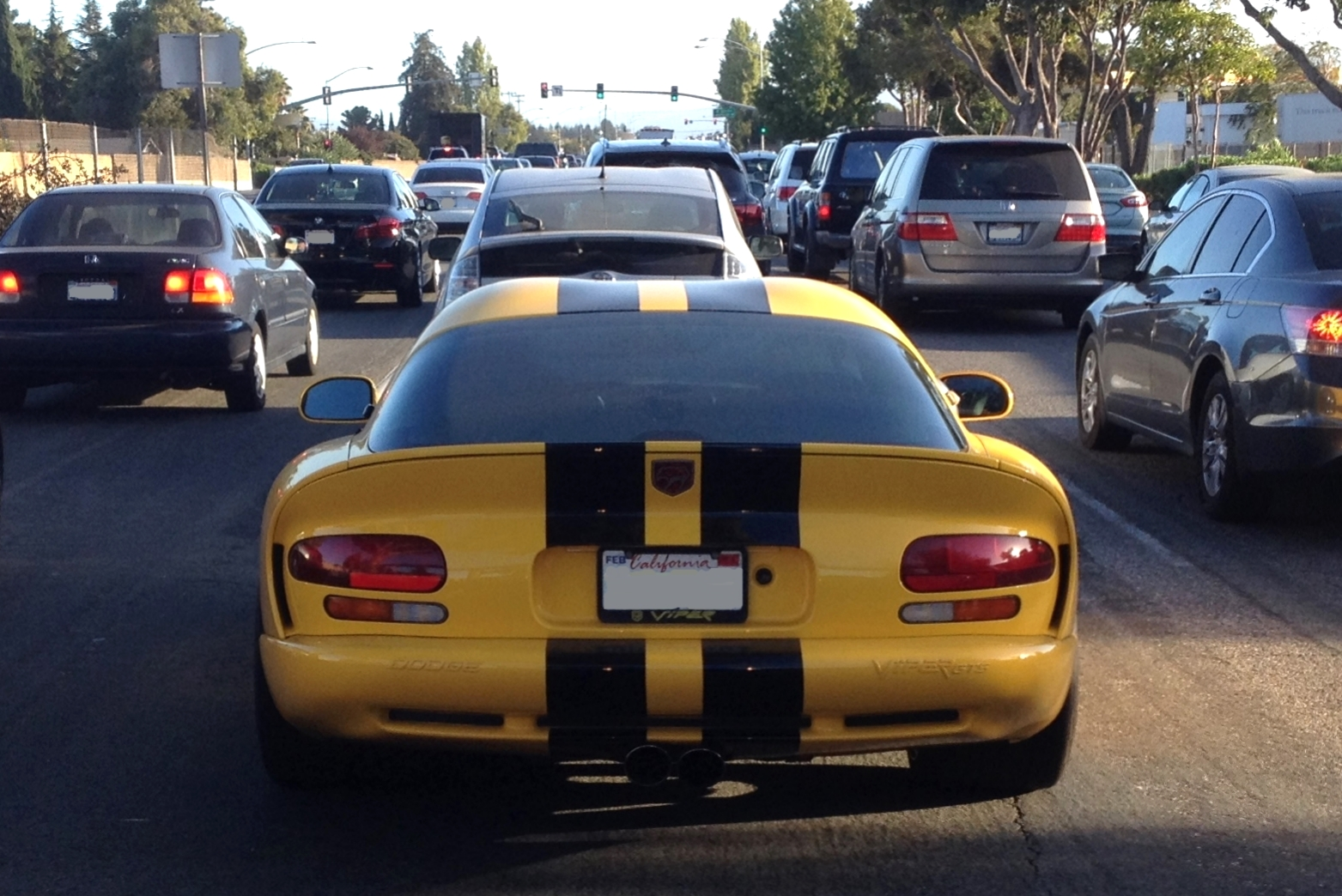
A variant of the game involves spotting yellow cars of any make and model (Dodge Viper shown here)

A version of the game in Europe involves spotting yellow cars, and it appears in the British radio sitcom Cabin Pressure under the name "yellow car", with no scoring.

In Scandinavia a similar game called gul bil exists. In Finland, the game was featured in a comedy sketch from Justimusfilms.

The U.S. National Park Service recognizes this version as the "banana game" in which players score points for being first to spot yellow cars. Different size and makes (e.g. sports cars and buses) may be worth more points.

Yellow cars have higher visibility on the road and are also known to be less popular than other car colors, making them ideal targets for spotting.

== Spotto ==
The Australian car-spotting game that combines "Yellow Car" and "Punch Buggy". However, the rules may extend to other types of vehicles including motorcycles, vans, trucks and buses etc. Players spot a yellow vehicle, proclaim "Spotto!" and then punch another passenger.

In the 1950s, BP gas stations would market their own version of road trip bingo with the name "spotto." In 2019, the International Spotto Federation (ISF) was formed by Richard Czeiger and his wife Alexandra Mattinson to formalize the official rules.

== See also ==
- Car numberplate game – Game or solo challenge based on license plate observation
