= 4040 =

4040, 40-40 or 40/40 may refer to:

- The year 4040 in the 5th millennium

== Computers ==
- Intel 4040, a microprocessor
- Commodore 4040, a model of floppy disk drive

== Roads ==
- County Road 4040 (Volusia County, Florida), a historic road
- A4040 road, a road in Birmingham, England

== Sports and games ==
- 40–40 club, a term in baseball
- The 40/40 Club, a sports bar chain
- Forty forty, a children's game

== Music ==
- 40/40 (The Carpenters album)
- 40/40: The Best Selection (Olivia Newton-John album)

== Other ==
- 4040 Purcell, an asteroid
