= Quaker Meeting =

Quaker Meeting may refer to:

- Monthly meeting, the basic unit of administration in the Religious Society of Friends (Quakers)
- Meeting for worship, a Quaker religious practice comparable to a church service
- Quaker meeting (game), a children's game
- Quaker Meeting (Quakertown, New Jersey), a historic district

== See also ==
- Friends meeting house
