= Scissors (game) =

Party game

Scissors is a party game in which the rules of game are hidden from some of the players. Players will sit in a circle and pass a pair of real or imaginary scissors to the player to the left of them. The scissors may be passed open or closed, depending on a rule which is known only to one or two players. As each player passes the scissors they will declare whether the scissors are open or closed as they attempt to deduce the rule. A player wins when they deduce the rule, so consistently pass the scissors in the correct form. Variants of this game have been recorded as early as the nineteenth century.

== Play ==
The players sit on chairs in a circle, preferably without a table in the way, and have an object such as an empty plastic drink bottle or even a genuine pair of scissors. In turn, each player passes the object to the player on their left stating whether they are passing the scissors open or passing the scissors closed. As each player does this the others say whether they have got it right — the players who already know the game judge whether the passing was correct or not. The objective of the game is to work out what is going on and consistently find the correct method of passing.

== Solution ==
The most common solution to this game is that scissors are passed closed if your legs (or even ankles) are crossed, or if the passer's hands are closed, and the scissors are passed open if uncrossed or if the passer has their hands open. At the beginning of the game positions and movements should be natural. Towards the end, they will need to be heavily exaggerated.

== Other variations ==
Other variations of this game theme are common, where different objects work as the "scissors" with the same solution, or with slightly different solutions — for example, the legs may need to be uncrossed when not passing, or the pass may need to be done so that the passing arm crosses the body. There may also be a combination of actions, such as needing to pass a pair of scissors blade-first to the next player as well as crossing or uncrossing the legs; the player may realize that one part is necessary but not the other.

In Finland, a similar game is played under the name Näin räätäli sakset antaa ("This Is How The Tailor Hands The Scissors"). As in the version described above, the trick is also to cross one's legs or ankles while passing the scissors to the next person, but the same phrase of "this is how the tailor hands the scissors" is repeated no matter if the scissors are open or closed. Players who know the trick may fool others with complicated hand gestures or by emphasizing one of the words. The clueless participants will then unsuccessfully try to mimic the previous person who did it correctly. There is a game judge who knows the trick from the start and will watch people when they pass the scissors, telling them "that's right" or "no, that's wrong". After some time passes, people may incidentally have their legs crossed, and eventually most people will figure out that crossing legs is the trick.

The Dropout panel show Game Changer was loosely based on Scissors when it was first pitched by host and current Dropout CEO Sam Reich. Every episode features a different game, with the players usually unaware of the game or its rules before play begins.

== Origin ==
The origin of the game is unknown, but rules for one early version appear in an 1860 publication:

A pair of scissors, or any similar article, is passed from hand to hand, each player saying as she gives them to her neighbour, "I return you my crossed (or uncrossed) scissors." In the first case, she must, whilst pronouncing the formula, carelessly cross her hands or feet; in the second, she must be careful to keep them apart. This game, simple as it is, often greatly puzzles those unacquainted with the secret.

A similar game was described in the Los Angeles Times in 1899:

A simple game is to have a pair of blunt scissors. All the company sits in a circle, and one takes the scissors and hands them to his neighbor on the right saying: "I make you a present of a pair of scissors closed". They can say "open" or "closed" at will, the company immediately crossing their feet and hands when any one says open and vice versa. This game should be played in a very lively manner, so as to cause those playing to forget and leave their hands and feet crossed and uncrossed at the wrong time. Forfeits are paid when a mistake is made. It is something after the old game of "Simon says."

The version now played was included in a 1905 games book:

The leader hands a closed pair of scissors to her accomplice, who takes it and says: "I received these scissors uncrossed and I give them crossed." (Opening the scissors as she speaks.) She passes them to the player on her right who should say: "I receive these scissors crossed and I give them crossed." (If they are left open; if closed, they are uncrossed.) Those who do not know the game receive the scissors and pass them and say what they think they ought. It may be just what the player before said, but the condition of the scissors may not be the same, and, therefore, it is not right. Thus each one has a turn, and the game continues until some bright player notices that the scissors are called crossed when they are open and uncrossed when they are closed, and that the player who knows the game crossed her feet if the scissors were crossed, and if not, her feet were uncrossed, or resting on the floor as usual.

== See also ==
- Psychiatrist (game)
- Mao (game)
