= Fuck, marry, kill =

Forced choice question-and-answer game

Fuck, Marry, Kill, also known as Kiss, Marry, Kill, as Bang, Marry, Kill, or as Bang, Smash, Dash, or with other synonyms or arrangements of the terms, is a social forced choice question-and-answer game. As one source describes it, "[w]e have heard of the game "Kiss, Marry, Kill" in which people fantasize about which of the three choices they would exercise on someone". In the game, one person poses three names of people known to the other, typically either names of people known in their personal lives or names of celebrities or fictional characters. The other person then has to decide which of the three they would have sexual intercourse with (or kiss), which one they would marry, and which one they would kill.

== Overview ==
A 2009 Wonkette piece described it as "the popular children's schoolyard game of 'Fuck, Marry, Kill'" and suggested that the "rules" of the game included an understanding that the player cannot have sex with the person they marry and that the person they do choose to have sex with, they can only have sex with one time. Slate, on the other hand, posted a lengthy staff debate in 2020 on the rules of the game, including the question of whether the marriage must be celibate or whether it could include sex but of a lesser quality than that of the sex-only option. The Slate staff also debated whether the sex option implied a single encounter and never seeing the person again after the encounter. The British BBC Three reality television show Snog Marry Avoid? has been observed to present a variation on the theme, with a piece in Feminist Review noting the "explicitly sexualized" element of having men make this judgment from images of "everyday" women who are total strangers to them.

The game has been criticized and described as "tasteless" and "juvenile". In April 2018, singer J Balvin received criticism for his responses when induced to play the game during an interview, when he suggested in response to the question that singer Rihanna would not be a good person to marry. A 2020 hostile work environment lawsuit against $9 billion hedge fund Advent Capital alleged, among other things, that male employees of the company "played the juvenile game '[fuck], marry, kill.'"

== In popular culture ==
In a 2007 episode of the sitcom 30 Rock titled "Up All Night" (in which the game is called "marry, boff, kill"), characters in the show playing the game regarding one another discover feelings that shape their relationships. A 2008 article in The Onion captioned a photograph in a parody piece with "Sen. Clinton scans the Senate floor, passing the time with a quick game of 'Fuck, Marry, Kill'". A 2012 single by Nikki Williams was named "Kill, Fuck, Marry". The Chicago Tribune celebrated the 2014 Netflix release of the TV series Friends with a "Bang, Marry, Kill: 'Friends' edition", offering rationales for applying different combinations of the options to the respective trios of male and female main characters. The 2017 film Spider-Man: Homecoming has a scene in which two girls in Peter Parker's high school play the game regarding Thor, Iron Man, and the Hulk. The reboot Animaniacs on Hulu has a scene where Putin and Kim Jong-un are playing the game with actors named Chris. In the second last episode of season 2 of the satirical dramedy Succession, the game is played by key characters while being held as hostages.

== See also ==
- Conversation games
- Never have I ever
- Smash or pass?
- Would you rather
