= Zip and bong =

Car or party group-dynamic game

Zip and bong (also known as zip bong, zip 'n' bong, or zip zip bong) is a car or party group-dynamic game which requires little skill and no accessories. Surfacing around the turn of the 21st century, it is widespread throughout the United States, with documented practice on the East and West Coasts and in the Midwest and South, largely in college and youth communities.

== Rules and play ==
Playable by three (and to some extent two) or more players, the game involves the participants (if numerous, then seated in a circle) "passing" the word zip to the person on their right with their lips curled in over their teeth. The person to one's right must do the same, and so on. If any participant wishes to change the flow of the passage, he or she must say the word bong instead of zip, reverting the game's direction.

The word bong performs one of two functions, depending on how the game is played. The first (and probably more common) function simply uses bong to switch the game's direction. The second has zip stand for a clockwise flow and bong stand for a counterclockwise flow, thus giving both the words zip and bong the power to revert the flow. In either case, use of the words can result in an effective restricting of the game between two players until one chooses not to revert the flow.

The object of the zip and bong is to stay in play. This is accomplished by never showing one's teeth and by not missing one's turn (which is potentially difficult in small groups who make use of the word reversion).

The game can be difficult because the absurdity of its play easily causes laughter, which can lead to exposure of the teeth.
