= Poor pussy =

Party game

Poor pussy is an old party game played by children and adults often in drama classes or at parties. As it is described:

This game makes everybody laugh. Have the guests sit around the room. Choose one person to be the pussy. Pussy must go over to a guest and meow three times. The guest must pet pussy's head three times and say "Poor pussy, poor pussy, poor pussy," without laughing. The pussy should do their best to make the guest laugh. They can make funny meows and walk around like a cat. The pussy goes from one guest to another until someone laughs. The first one to laugh becomes the new pussy.

A variation of this game involves the exchange: Person: "Honey, I love you, give me a smile." Guest: "Honey, you know I love you, but I just can't smile."
