= Zoom Schwartz Profigliano =

Drinking game

Zoom Schwartz Profigliano, also known as figliano, is a verbal "tag" drinking game with many variations. One player at a time is active ("it"). The active player states a command from a predefined set of words, which typically include "zoom," "schwartz," and "profigliano." The command shifts active status to another player, 'tagging' them. Play continues until a player fouls by giving a command when not active, by failing to give a command promptly when active, or in some cases by giving a command which is prohibited by the current state of the game. The game lends itself to bluffing where the active player uses nonverbal communication to suggest that someone else is active. In a high-speed game a player might give a command passing active status to one player while looking at a different player, confusing the situation.

== General overview ==
Figliano requires at least four players, with six to eight optimum. The first player holds an imaginary ball. They pass it by looking at another player and stating one of the accepted calls. The ball is given to the person defined by the word chosen. The ball is passed either to the person looked at or to another player that was previously ricocheted off of in the prior pass, depending upon the word used. During play, only passage words are allowed to be spoken.

While it is often a drinking game, in which a player who fouls must take a drink, in non-drinking forms the fouling player is just embarrassed. Either way, the fouling player starts the next round. There is also a children's version where a break in the conversation eliminates the player. The games can have as few commands as the basic "Zoom", "Schwartz" and "Profigliano", but some variations have as many as fifteen commands. Play usually begins with two or three basic commands, then additional commands are added as the players become more proficient, increasing the difficulty factor.

Some variants also have motions which must be made along with the command. Other versions describe the game as players passing around an imaginary ball of energy, a version also used as an improvisation game, where the object is to get the 'ball of energy' moving around the circle as fast as possible. Generally, however, it is accepted that all those participating in the game are friends, and when a player 'fouls' it is considered rude for fellow participants to literally 'point out' the player that fouled, opting instead to simply 'indicate' the fouler, by raising a bent arm, with the elbow aimed at the participant that committed the foul. A common expression explaining this courtesy is that 'friends don't point fingers, friends indicate'.

== Calls ==
Zoom
This call is for passing the 'ball' to the person the caller looks at. It is a foul to call zoom to a player already being engaged.
Schwartz
This call is for passing the 'ball' to the player that just passed the ball or the zoomer. It is a foul to look away when calling schwartz.
Figliano
A contracted version of Profigliano. It is a no-look or look pass back to the person you are currently engaged with.

== Strategy ==
Techniques to stimulate a mistake by another include: using all six words instead of only a few, constantly changing who the 'it' player is looking at, and varying the speed.

The game lends itself to coaxing a non-active player into speaking a command word by looking at them with the expectation of a response when speaking a command word or visualizing an expectation of a response from a non-active player who was looked at in the last pass.

The player starting the round must start by stating the name of the game (Zoom-Schwartz-Profigliano in this case) and must start with the first command (Zoom in this case).

== Possible origins ==
The first play of the game may have been at Towson University in 1914. Others say Zoom was brought to Ventura College in California in 1971 by Kelly Weaverling, a former Navy submariner who claimed the game originated by the Navy submarine crew he worked with. Kelly taught the game to the technical students at Ventura College.

Zoom Schwartz Profigliano was actively played at the University of California at Davis starting in 1976 and included the commands "Beefeater," which passed the "it" to the active player's left, and "Beutermann," which passed the "it" to the active player's right. This was normally done with bluffing to further enhance the game. Another variation utilized in the late 1980s at SUNY Morrisville coined the term “Coleman”. Alternately known as the CH29 rule, the studious player will sparingly employ this peppy bluffing tactic to pass the “it” to the player to their immediate left regardless of what direction they are looking.

== See also ==
- Zip Zap Zop
- List of drinking games
