= Would you rather =

Conversational party game

"Would you rather" is a conversation or party game that poses a dilemma in the form of a question beginning with "would you rather". The dilemma can be between two supposedly good options such as "Would you rather have the power of flight or the power of invisibility?", two attractive choices such as "Would you rather have money or have fame?", or two supposedly bad options such as "Would you rather sleep with your best friend's lover or your lover's best friend?" The players, sometimes including the questioner, then must choose their answers. Answering "neither" or "both" is against the rules. This leads the players to debate their rationales.

The game is played on the podcasts Comedy Bang! Bang! and Richard Herring's Leicester Square Theatre Podcast, the horror film Would You Rather, the Disney Channel TV series Coop & Cami Ask the World, and the BBC America game show Would You Rather...? with Graham Norton. The game is a "running gag" on Family Guy, played by Peter, Cleveland, Joe, and Quagmire.

== See also ==
- Conversation games
- Fuck, Marry, Kill
- Never Have I Ever
- Sophie's Choice (disambiguation)
