= Car numberplate game =

Game or solo challenge based on license plate observation

A car numberplate game is a car game playable in the United Kingdom and other countries with a suitable car registration scheme, either looking out for a particular number or characteristic of a number plate, or thinking of a word or phrase that corresponds to the letters of the registration. Most are solitary games, however some can be played individually in competition with other passengers.

== In Europe ==
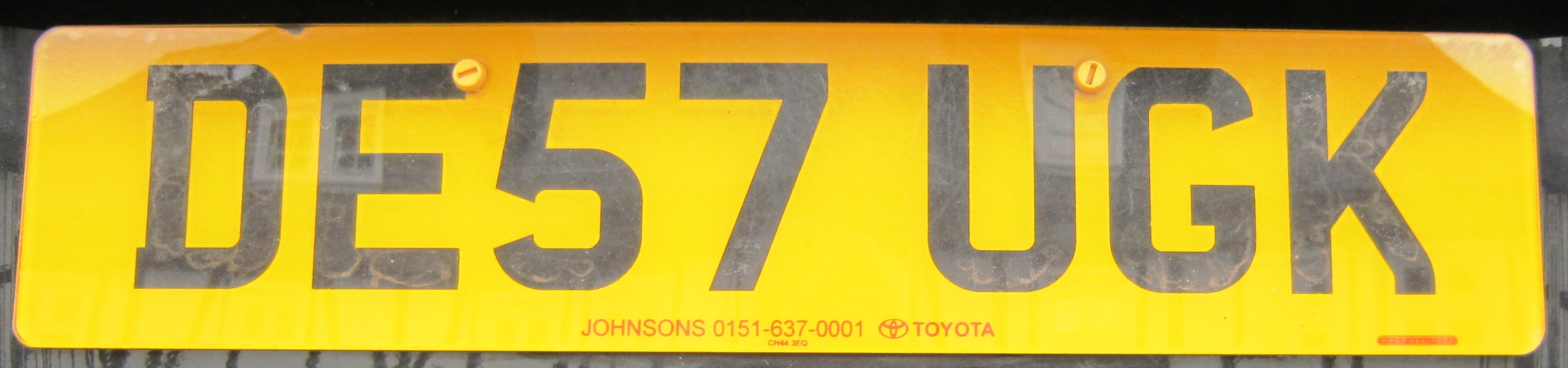
A British car number plate

One game played in Europe is to spot the 26 letters of the alphabet on passing number plates, starting with A and working forwards. To make this a competitive game between two teams, a second team can work backwards at the same time.

Another game involves spotting number plates with each number from 1 to 999 in order. The letters around the numbers are ignored. This was playable in the UK prior to 2001 when number plates read XXX 111X or X111 XXX, but since the current system of XX11 XXX was introduced in September 2001, such plates have become rarer and this particular game harder to play.

In Bulgaria plates typically have 4 numbers. The goal of the game is to make the first half equal to the second by using various calculations. For example, one scores a point with XX4282XX, as soon as he figures that 4 + 2 = 8 - 2. The letters around the numbers are ignored.

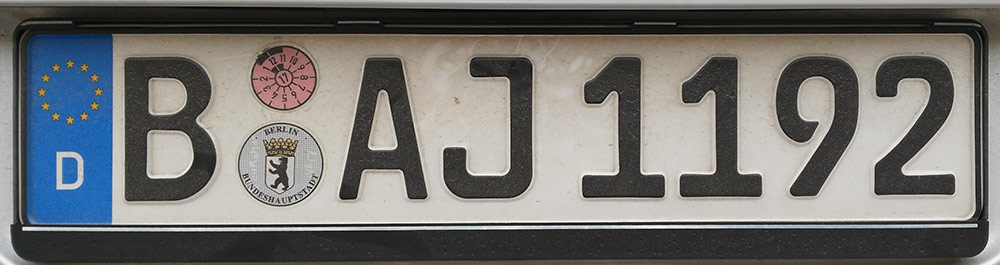
A German license plate from Berlin

In countries where local regions are marked on number plates, such as France or Germany, players can look for cars from different areas. In France, the last two digits of the number plate shows the car's department (e.g. 49 is Maine-et-Loire and 16 is Charente.). German plates also indicate where the car is registered (e.g. B is Berlin and KL is Kaiserslautern), however this changed from 2014.

Another game is spotting unusual vanity plates, where the car owner has paid a premium to get a particular code, like "REDBMW", "HERTOY," or "BONZO". In most European countries, premiums for such license plates are very high (sometimes as much as 2,000 euros), so very few drivers own such plates.

Another European version is spotting a plate and taking the letters - in order - and trying to construct a word which contain all the letters in the same order. For example, a Swede might see the plate "SVG111" and construct the Sweden words sving ("swing") or Sverige (Sweden). Points can be rewarded in different manners, such as finding the shortest word or finding the longest word.

A similar variant, particularly popular in the United Kingdom, involves considering the last three letters of a number plate to be an acronym, and creating a three-word sentence that fits. For example, a number plate ending in ZKG could be "Zebra Kills Giraffe". This game is not playable with most European number plates, unless they contain three characters in a row.

== In North America ==
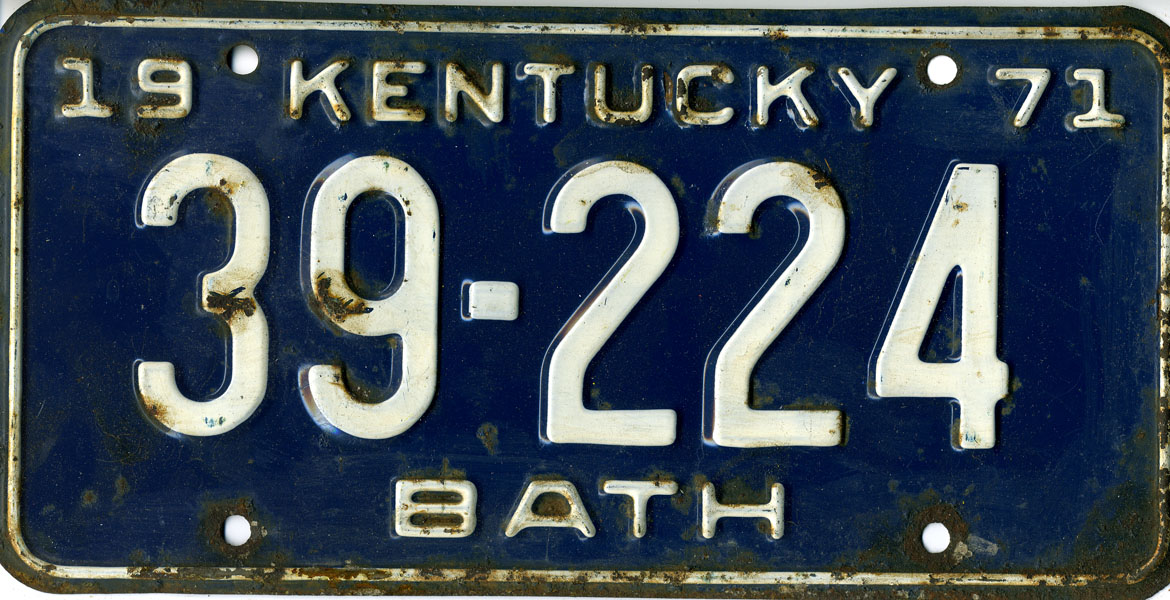
A US license plate, from the state of Kentucky

A North American version of the game, commonly referred to as the "license plate game," involves attempting to find a license plate from each Canadian province, U.S. or Mexican state. After one player has spotted a plate especially rare in that region, the other players get a higher number of points by spotting another plate that matches the first. If a player calls out a state that has already been named, or the wrong state, they may have to pay some physical forfeit. (This game can also be played in Ireland, where numberplates indicate the city to which the car is registered.)

Another game common in North America is "license plate poker," in which the players attempt to form poker hands from the characters on license plates. Since North American plates have shorter texts than those in Europe, this is more difficult than it would seem. Flushes are obviously impossible, and straights are exceedingly rare.

Another game is spotting unusual vanity plates (as in Europe), or spotting a double letter or number (i.e. ABC-113 or ABB-113).

A point-scoring game can be played in the U.S. by assigning each plate a point value based on the last digit on the plate. Letters are assigned points based on their position in the alphabet, e.g., a plate with the letter M for the last digit is worth 13 points. A further variation allows points for plates that end in zero by moving back in the plate until a non-zero digit is found. In this variation the hypothetical plate ABC120 would be worth 20 points. Points are totaled for either the current trip or multiple legs of a trip by agreement.

== Similar games ==
Various car-spotting games exist in which players look out for cars which have rare traits, such as a particular colour or model.

The Canadian gameshow Bumper Stumpers ran in the 1980s, and challenged its contestants to solve gramogram letter puzzles presented as vanity licence plates, such as "PYR88" having a solution of "pirates" ("pyr" + "eights").
