= FMK 9C1 =

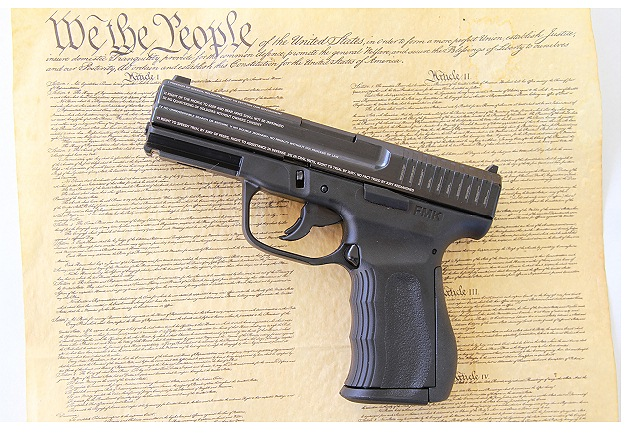
- First model FMK 9C1 displayed on top of a copy of the US Constitution
- Type: Semi-automatic pistol
- Place of origin: United States

Production history
- Designer: FMK Firearms
- Designed: -2010
- Manufacturer: FMK Firearms

Specifications
- Mass: 23.45 oz with empty magazine
- Length: 6.85"
- Barrel length: 4"
- Width: 1.14"
- Height: 5.09"
- Cartridge: 9×19mm Parabellum
- Action: Short recoil
- Feed system: 10 or 14-round box magazine
- Sights: Interchangeable Fixed 3-dot low profile system

The 9C1 is a family of polymer-framed, short recoil-operated, locked-breech semi-automatic pistols designed and manufactured by FMK Firearms in California.

== Design features ==
The FMK 9C1 is a polymer-framed short-recoil semiautomatic pistol chambered for the 9×19mm Parabellum. It comes with 14 or 10 round double stacked magazines depending on the local restrictions. Like other pistols on its class, it has a firing pin block, a loaded chamber indicator. and a Glock-style trigger safety. Similar to a Glock and some versions of the Smith & Wesson M&P, it does not incorporate a frame-mounted safety lever.

Dimensionally, it is comparable with a Glock G19, placing it in the same class as the G19, the Springfield Armory XD, Taurus G3, and the Smith & Wesson M&P 9.

9C1 G2 & G19 Specifications
	FMK 9C1 G2	Glock 19 G4
Magazine Capacity	14+1	15+1
Barrel Length	4in	4.01in
Overall Length	6.85in	7.28in
Width	1.14in	1.18in
Height	5.09in	5.99in
Weight	23.45oz	23.65oz

Uncommon in pistols, it offers two distinct but interchangeable trigger systems:

- A double-action-only (DAO) firing mechanism, which also has a magazine lock and is aimed at sales to California and Massachusetts. This magazine lock also causes the magazine to not drop free when you depress the release button.

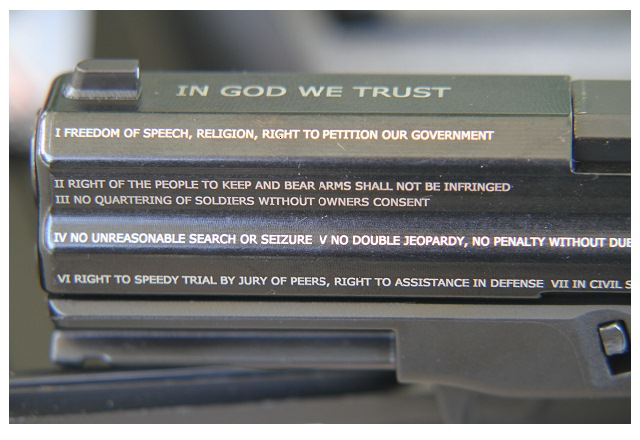
Bill of Rights Scrip on FMK 91c slide

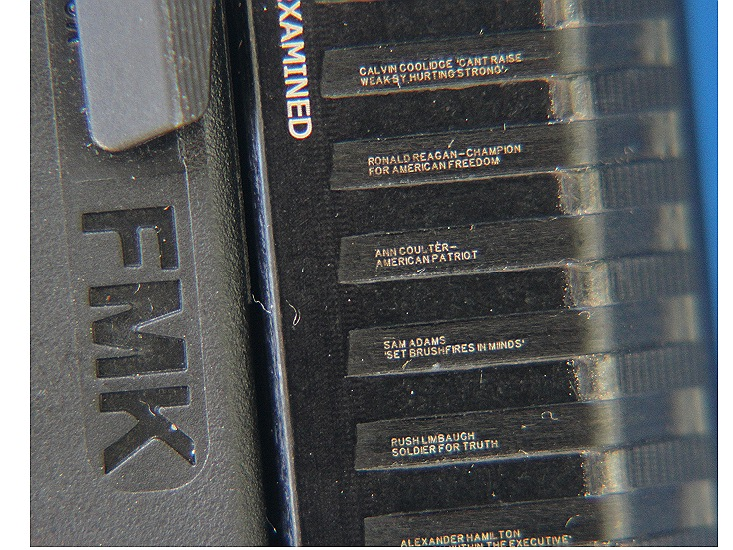
Subscrip on FMK slide serrations.

- A single-action-only (SAO) firing mechanism, which is named Fast Action Trigger (FAT) by the manufacturer. There has been different versions of this trigger, the current one is identified by the number 804 engraved on its left side.

Some of the 2nd generation of the pistol have the bill of rights engraved on the slide. The 9C1 pistol is made in California and is approved for sale in California. This handgun is not designed to use +P ammunition or low quality reloaded ammunition.

== See also ==
- HK USP
- Glock 19
- Walther P99
- Springfield Armory XD
