= David McGranaghan =

Scottish actor, and writer

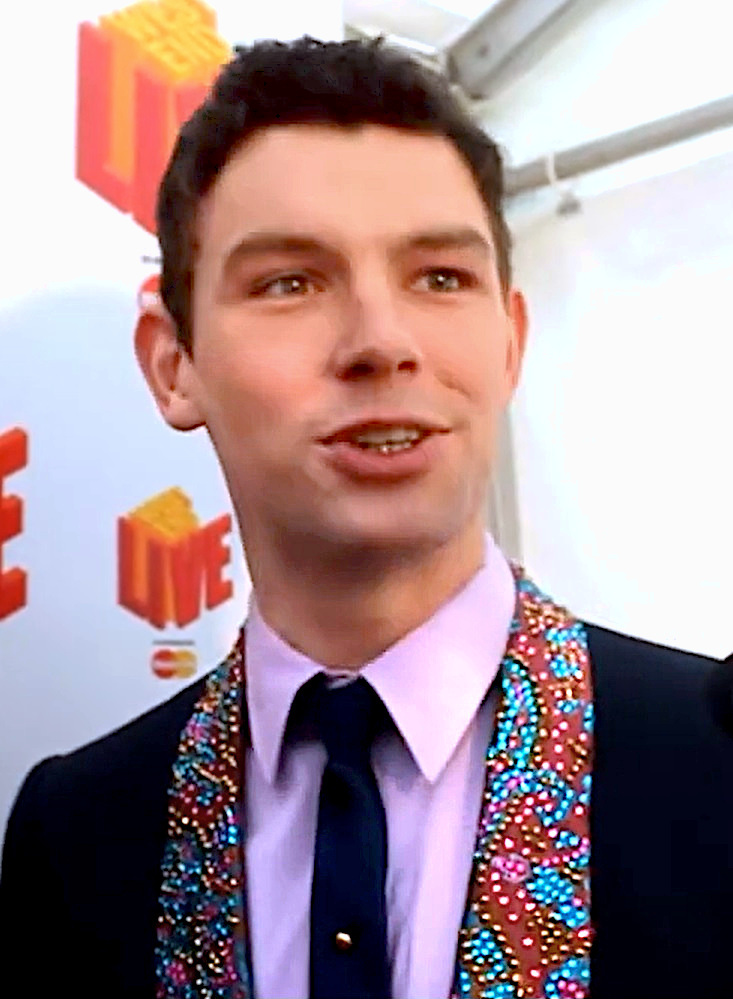
- McGranaghan in Jersey Boys 2013
- Education: Guildford School of Acting
- Occupations: Actor, comedy writer
- Notable work: Game For Fame

David McGranaghan is an actor and comedy writer originally from Largs, Scotland. He trained at the Guildford School of Acting before performing in a number of theatre performances;

- Jersey Boys in London's Prince Edward Theatre
- The Homecoming, Merchant of Venice, Taming of the Shrew and MacBeth at the Royal Shakespeare Company
- Chariots of Fire in London's Gielgud Theatre
- Be Near Me at the Donmar Warehouse and National Theatre of Scotland

As well as acting, McGranaghan co-invented Game For Fame the Party Board Game with Joseph Pitcher. McGranaghan also has written and performed in his own YouTube comedy channel Dave McG TV which has had over 1,000,000 hits. Dave McG TV has been commissioned by AOL's comedy channel Quipstar and David is currently filming series 3.
