= Game For Fame =

Party board game

Game for Fame is a party board game in which 4-16 players cooperate with and compete against their teammates in a number of physical challenges to earn money. The player with the largest amount of money at the end of the game is the winner. Game For Fame was invented by David McGranaghan and Joseph Pitcher in 2010.

The game box includes 130 Money Maker cards, four pawns, cheques, four pencils, a timer, and a notepad.

Game For Fame is available in the US, UK, Canada and The Netherlands in a Dutch language edition published by actor Julian Miller. The game is available through the McMiller Entertainment website. It retails for US$22.99 with free shipping. The game is directed at ages ten and over and for 4-16 players. An expansion pack is also available which includes 130 new Money Maker cards.
