= Quaker meeting (game) =

Children's game

Quaker Meeting, also known as Quaker's meeting or Cracker's Meeting (in the American South), is a child's game which is initiated with a rhyme and becomes a sort of quiet game where the participants may not speak, laugh, or smile, while the player in charge of the "meeting" may act like a comedian in an attempt to elicit one of the forbidden responses, and so get the participant who broke the taboo "out." The rhyme has many variations, but is similar to the following:

Quaker meeting has begun;
No more laughing, no more fun.
If you show your teeth or tongue,
you must pay a forfeit.

Another version is as follows:

Quaker meeting has begun;
no more talking, no more fun.
No more chewing bubble gum,
Starting now!

In the American South, where there are fewer Quakers, the rhyme often goes:

Cracker's meeting has begun.
No more laughing, no more fun.
If you smile or show your teeth,
you'll be punished for a week.

== See also ==
- Quakers
