= FMK Firearms =

American firearms manufacturer

- Industry: Arms Industry
- Founded: 2006
- Founder: Jim Pontillo
- Headquarters: Placentia, CA 92870, United States
- Products: Firearms
- Website: http://www.fmkfirearms.com/

FMK Firearms is an American manufacturer of firearms located in California. It was founded in 2006 by Jim Pontillo and Mr. ED They are known for producing the FMK 9C1, the FMK AR1 Patriot, and the FMK AR1 Extreme. The Patriot and Extreme are composite polymer AR15 lower receivers.

== FMK 9C1 Pistol ==
The FMK 9C1 pistol is a semiautomatic pistol that comes with either 10 or 14 round magazines. It is known for being similar in function to other service pistols such as the Glock design.

== FMK AR1 Patriot and Extreme ==
FMK's first generation polymer lower receiver was the FMK AR1 Patriot. It had reports of breakages at the rear takedown pin. After redesign in 2013 the FMK AR1 Extreme was introduced replacing the Patriot. The redesign included beefing up the area around the rear takedown pin. There may have also been reformulation of the composite polymer that is used in the production of the lowers.
