= Diversity Icebreaker =

Questionnaire used in seminars to improve communication

Diversity Icebreaker (DI) is a Norwegian-developed, certified tool for communication, reflection, and collaboration. DI consists of a questionnaire and a seminar concept used in organizational and personnel contexts.

== Method ==
The Diversity Icebreaker is a process tool often used within a structured workshop process explained by Ekelund and Langvik in their book “Diversity Icebreaker. How to manage diversity processes”. The workshop is usually run for groups from 9 to 150 persons and lasts between one and two hours. The participants are divided into groups – Red, Blue or Green – based on the results from the questionnaire. Red preference is characterized by a strong focus on relations, personal involvement and a social perspective. Blue preference is recognized by focus on structure and task, and through a logic perspective. Green perspective is seen in focus on change, vision and ideas. The meaning of the three categories is established during the seminar. It originates from the questionnaire's items (questions) as well as from participant's personal experiences and the local culture, thus making the categories of red, blue and green flexible and applicable in many contexts.

Through the seminar process the sense of the categories is worked out by the participants themselves. They discover the effect of putting labels on each other, as well as the effect of “us” versus “the others” way of thinking. A systematic use of humor is central in the process and stimulates the participants to a safe and open reflection about differences.

Feedback report

In 2022, an extended feedback report called Premium was introduced. This report provides individual information based on the three dimensions (Red, Blue, Green) of Diversity Icebreaker and outlines possible applications in communication, personal development, and teamwork. It is typically provided after a seminar but can also be used independently of a seminar, making the tool appear more like a traditional psychological test.

== Application areas ==
Diversity Icebreaker is used to work on a wide range of subjects from focus on communication and interaction in general to more specific topics like team development, intercultural relations, learning styles and conflict resolution. Users vary from multinationals to smaller companies independently of sector of activity, schools and universities, non-profit organizations,

Romani describes how she uses the concept when teaching in multicultural classes of business students in Singapore, making the students aware of how the self-other categories have effects on the group dynamics. Similar application of the concept in Bangladesh is reported by Orgeret. The Diversity Icebreaker is also named in a book by Maureen B. Rabotin among other tools relevant for improving cooperation across cultures.

Application of the Diversity Icebreaker was also named in the area of mentoring

== Development ==
Diversity Icebreaker was developed by Bjørn Z. Ekelund. The work started following a project in 1995 where focus groups were asked to give ideas on how to communicate to obtain changes in behavior of other people. When the participants sorted the ideas, three main categories occurred. These categories were used for the first time in 1995 in marketing campaigns and training of consultants, where the aim was to reduce energy consumption among power supplier's customers. The development of the categories and evaluation of the first campaign were presented in Bjørn Z. Ekelund's MBA thesis.

The first edition of the questionnaire, which identified an individual's preference towards one of the roles blue, red, or green was made in 1998 and published in a book about team development written by Dansk Psykologisk Forlag in Denmark. Since then, the questionnaire has been reedited in 2003 and 2005. Since 2012, the concept is branded in the UK and in the USA under the name Trialogue.

Ekelund was awarded the prize "Consultant of the Year 2008" for the development of the Diversity Icebreaker. The Research Council of Norway supported development of the tool in the years 2011-2012

=== Certification by DNV Business Assurance ===
On 27 November 2013, Diversity Icebreaker was certified as a team assessment tool for development by DNV Business Assurance, which administers standards for work-related psychological tests in occupational settings. The quality requirements applied by DNV are based on the framework of the Certification Council for Test Use in Norway (STN), which in turn builds on the standards of the European Federation of Psychologists’ Associations (EFPA 2013 Test Review Model ver 4.2.6). Parts of the scientific documentation forming the basis for the DNV certification have been published by the publisher.

Diversity Icebreaker was recertified by DNV in 2016, 2019, and 2023, with validity until 27 November 2027.

== Research ==
As of 2025, the normative basis for Diversity Icebreaker is derived from responses provided by 124,771 individuals. These data are employed both for calculating individual scores and for generating group profiles. Group profiles allow for comparison of seminar results with the average in the normative material, as well as with different professions and nationalities. Information regarding the standard deviation within each group is also reported.

Analyses of the norm data indicate that men, on average, score higher on the Blue and Green dimensions, while women tend to score higher on the Red dimension. Age differences are relatively minor, though respondents under the age of 18 are more likely to score higher on Green, whereas respondents over 60 show higher average scores on Blue.

Reliability, measured as internal consistency through Cronbach’s alpha based on 473 respondents, has been reported in the range of 0.75 to 0.82. Test–retest reliability has been measured at r(tt)=.872 for Blue, r(tt)=.793 for Red, and r(tt)=.838 for Green, p<.001.

The Red, Blue, and Green dimensions have been systematically validated against a range of constructs, including personality traits, emotional intelligence, cultural values, Interpersonal Problems (IIP), and team processes [20]. These categories have also been applied in marketing research, for example in studies of brand personality.

=== Evaluation studies ===
Since 2008, several evaluation studies of Diversity Icebreaker have been conducted using both qualitative and quantitative methodologies. The first study was based on interviews with experienced consultants and applied a qualitative design.

An independent study published in 2015 examined a two-year employee engagement project at a Norwegian university involving more than 400 technical–administrative staff. The study identified the Diversity Icebreaker communication model as a central factor in the project’s reported outcomes.

In 2025, Canadian researchers published a study investigating the use of Diversity Icebreaker in combination with elements of the South African Ubuntu philosophy. The study was carried out in a Norwegian municipality where 2,500 employees and managers participated in an organizational and leadership development program. The authors concluded that the combination contributed to leadership development and collaboration by offering a shared language for addressing differences and promoting community.

Since 2013, annual experimental studies have been conducted at the Hebrew University, indicating that Diversity Icebreaker seminars can increase positivity, reduce distrust, foster attentiveness to others, and enhance psychological safety—factors associated with creativity and conflict resolution. Later studies have also identified limitations, including cases where seminar participation was associated with reduced willingness to engage in dialogue with individuals holding extreme views outside the seminar groups.
