= Truth or dare? =

Verbal party game

- Players: 2 or more
- Playing time: Variable
- Chance: low
- Skills: creativity, embarrassment tolerance

Truth or dare? is a mostly verbal party game requiring two or more players. Players are given the choice between answering a question truthfully, or performing a "dare". The game is particularly popular among adolescents and children.

== History ==
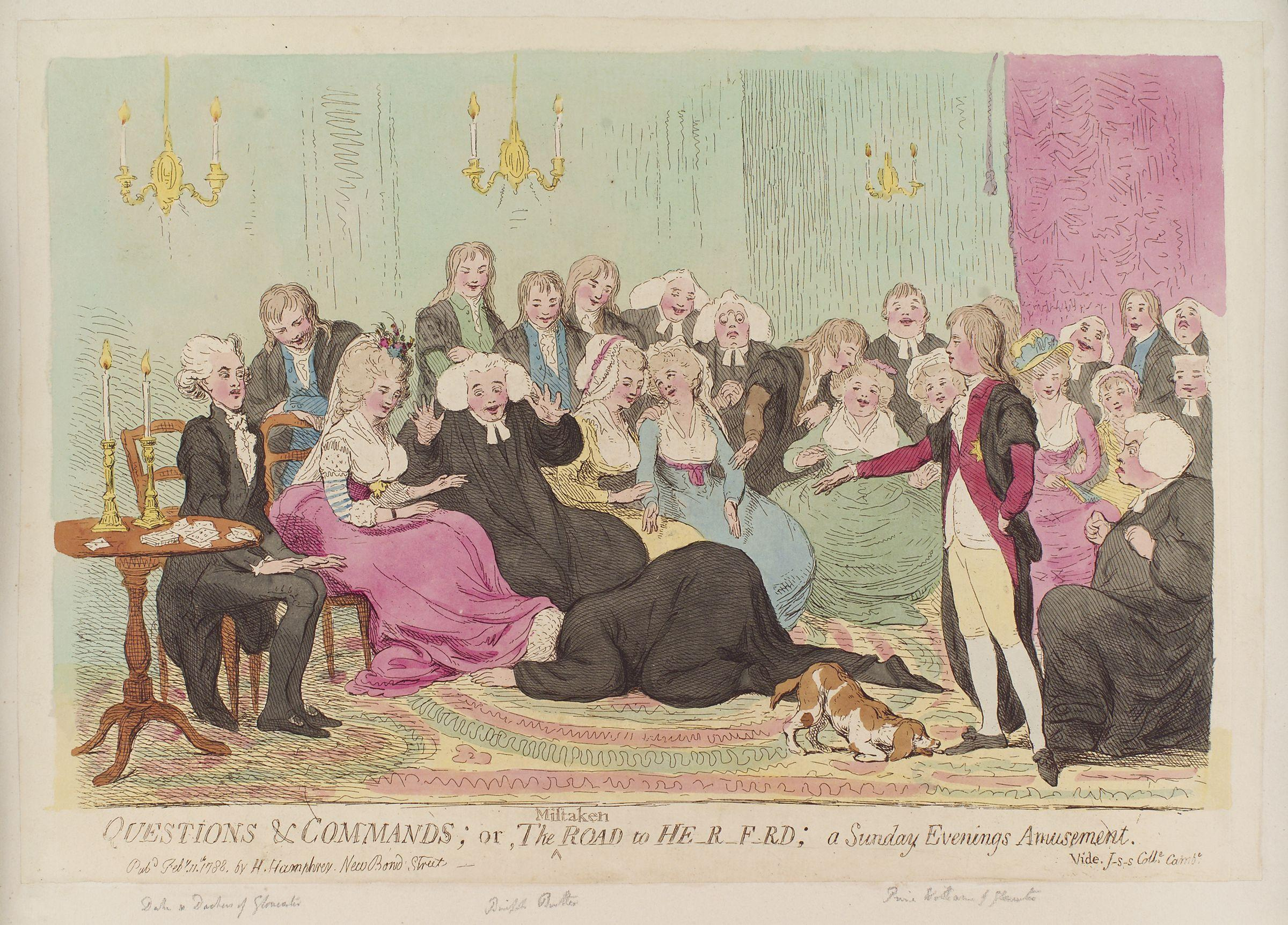
A game of "Questions and Commands" depicted by James Gillray, 1788

The game has existed for hundreds of years, with at least one variant, "questions and commands", being attested as early as 1712:

A Christmas game, in which the commander bids their subjects to answer a question which is asked. If the subject refuses or fails to satisfy the commander, they must pay a forfeit [follow a command] or have their face smutted [dirtied].

Truth or dare may ultimately derive from command games such as the ancient Greek basilinda (in Greek: βασιλίνδα). This game is described by Julius Pollux: "in which we are told a king, elected by lot, commanded his comrades what they should perform".

In some cases, pedophiles have used the Truth or Dare game to groom their victims.

== In popular culture ==
The 2018 horror film Truth or Dare features the game heavily. In the film, participants are put to death if they lie or fail to go through with dares.

== See also ==
- Game of dares
- Never have I ever
