= Kaguya-sama: Love Is War season 1 =

2019 romance comedy anime

Kaguya-sama: Love Is War
- Season 1
- No. of episodes: 12

Release
- Original network: MBS, Tokyo MX, BS11, GTV, GYT, CTV, TeNY
- Original release: January 12 – March 30, 2019

Season chronology
- Next → Love Is War?

The first season of the Kaguya-sama: Love Is War anime television series is based on the manga series Kaguya-sama: Love Is War by Aka Akasaka. The anime television series adaptation was announced by Shueisha on June 1, 2018. The series was directed by Mamoru Hatakeyama and written by Yasuhiro Nakanishi, with animation by A-1 Pictures. Yuuko Yahiro provided the character designs, while Jin Aketagawa served the sound director and Kei Haneoka composed the series' music. The series premiered from January 12 to March 30, 2019, broadcasting on MBS, Tokyo MX, BS11, GTV, GYT, CTV, and TeNY. The series ran for 12 episodes. Masayuki Suzuki, Rikka Ihara, and Yoshiki Mizuno performs the series' opening song "Love Dramatic feat. Rikka Ihara", while Halca performs the series' ending theme song "Sentimental Crisis."

Aniplex of America have acquired the series in North America, and streamed the series on Crunchyroll, Hulu, and Funimation. In Australia and New Zealand, AnimeLab simulcasted the series within the region.

== Episodes ==
Story	Episode	Title	Directed by	Written by	Original release date
1	1	"I Want to Make You Invite Me to a Movie"; Transliteration: "Eiga ni Sasowasetai" (Japanese: 映画に誘わせたい)	Yūjirō Abe	Yasuhiro Nakanishi	January 12, 2019
1	1	"Kaguya Wants You to Stop Her"; Transliteration: "Kaguya-sama wa Tomeraretai" (Japanese: かぐや様は止められたい)	Yūjirō Abe	Yasuhiro Nakanishi	January 12, 2019
1	1	"Kaguya Wants You to Offer Her Food"; Transliteration: "Kaguya-sama wa Itadakitai" (Japanese: かぐや様はいただきたい)	Yūjirō Abe	Yasuhiro Nakanishi	January 12, 2019
Shuchi'in Academy's Student Council is led by president Miyuki Shirogane and vice president Kaguya Shinomiya, both of whom like each other but want the other to confess first. Secretary Chika Fujiwara has movie tickets to give to Miyuki, who puzzles over whether to invite Kaguya. However, Kaguya, who had planted the tickets, wants Miyuki to invite her. When Kaguya gets a love letter, Miyuki tries to stop her from going without confessing. When Miyuki brings his homemade lunch and shares some with Chika, Kaguya glares angrily at the two and gets jealous of their feeding each other.
2	2	"Kaguya Wants to Exchange Contact Info"; Transliteration: "Kaguya-sama wa Kōkan Shitai" (Japanese: かぐや様は交換したい)	Tarō Kubo	Yasuhiro Nakanishi	January 19, 2019
2	2	"Fujiwara Wants to Go Out"; Transliteration: "Fujiwara-chan wa Dekaketai" (Japanese: 藤原ちゃんは出かけたい)	Tarō Kubo	Yasuhiro Nakanishi	January 19, 2019
2	2	"Miyuki Shirogane Wants to Hide It"; Transliteration: "Shirogane Miyuki wa Kakushitai" (Japanese: 白銀御行は隠したい)	Tarō Kubo	Yasuhiro Nakanishi	January 19, 2019
Miyuki tries to get Kaguya to ask him for his LINE ID on his new smartphone, while Kaguya, who had secretly arranged the circumstances, does the same. Chika wants to go on a summer trip for the Student Council; Miyuki and Kaguya debate whether to go to the mountains or the ocean. A boy asks Miyuki for love advice on whether to confess to classmate Nagisa Kashiwagi while Kaguya listens in.
3	3	"Miyuki Shirogane Still Hasn't Done It"; Transliteration: "Shirogane Miyuki wa Mada Shitenai" (Japanese: 白銀御行はまだしてない)	Isono	Yukie Sugawara	January 26, 2019
3	3	"Kaguya Wants Him to Guess Right"; Transliteration: "Kaguya-sama wa Ateraretai" (Japanese: かぐや様は当てられたい)	Isono	Yukie Sugawara	January 26, 2019
3	3	"Kaguya Wants to Walk"; Transliteration: "Kaguya-sama wa Arukitai" (Japanese: かぐや様は歩きたい)	Isono	Yukie Sugawara	January 26, 2019
When Chika and Miyuki read a women's magazine article about teens doing it, Kaguya thinks it's not a big deal, misunderstanding the euphemism. Kaguya challenges Miyuki to a game of 20 questions to see if he knows what she likes. Kaguya has to walk to school; she hopes to meet Miyuki along the way, but is sidetracked by an elementary school student who wants her to help walk to school.
4	4	"Kaguya Wants Affection"; Transliteration: "Kaguya-sama wa Medetai" (Japanese: かぐや様は愛でたい)	Masaki Utsunomiya	Yukie Sugawara	February 2, 2019
4	4	"The Student Council Wants To Make Each Other Say It"; Transliteration: "Seitokai wa Iwasetai" (Japanese: 生徒会は言わせたい)	Masaki Utsunomiya	Yukie Sugawara	February 2, 2019
4	4	"Kaguya Wants To Make Him Send It"; Transliteration: "Kaguya-sama wa Okurasetai" (Japanese: かぐや様は送らせたい)	Masaki Utsunomiya	Yukie Sugawara	February 2, 2019
4	4	"Miyuki Shirogane Wants To Speak"; Transliteration: "Shirogane Miyuki wa Hanashitai" (Japanese: 白銀御行は話したい)	Masaki Utsunomiya	Yukie Sugawara	February 2, 2019
The Student Council prepares for an upcoming visit from their sister academy in France as Kaguya and Miyuki each try putting on cat ears. The Student Council plays a "forbidden word" game to find out who will go shopping. Kaguya stresses over what to text Miyuki until her personal assistant forces the issue by calling him from Kaguya's phone. The Student Council finally hosts the French students, but Miyuki is shocked to find out he's the only student who doesn't know any French beyond basic phrases. When the headmaster sends a cruel French girl to test Miyuki's resolve, her insults have no effect, but Kaguya scares the girl off with even harsher language.
5	5	"Kaguya Wants to Handle It"; Transliteration: "Kaguya-sama wa Konashitai" (Japanese: かぐや様はこなしたい)	Tsuyoshi Tobita	Yasuhiro Nakanishi	February 9, 2019
5	5	"Miyuki Shirogane Wants to Show Off"; Transliteration: "Shirogane Miyuki wa Misetsuketai" (Japanese: 白銀御行は見せつけたい)	Tsuyoshi Tobita	Yasuhiro Nakanishi	February 9, 2019
5	5	"Kaguya Wants to Be Covered"; Transliteration: "Kaguya-sama wa Sasaretai" (Japanese: かぐや様は差されたい)	Tsuyoshi Tobita	Yasuhiro Nakanishi	February 9, 2019
Nagisa Kashiwagi asks Kaguya for advice on breaking up with her boyfriend, but Kaguya, lacking experience, tries to help the girl find her boyfriend's good points, inadvertently revealing her own desires. Miyuki trains hard at volleyball to avoid looking dumb in front of the student body in a week, with Chika helping him train. When Kaguya is forced to walk home on a rainy day, both she and Miyuki try to make the other open an umbrella first.
6	6	"Yu Ishigami Wants to Live"; Transliteration: "Ishigami Yū wa Ikinobitai" (Japanese: 石上優は生き延びたい)	Takayuki Kikuchi	Yukie Sugawara	February 16, 2019
6	6	"Chika Fujiwara Wants to Test You"; Transliteration: "Fujiwara Chika wa Tesuto-shitai" (Japanese: 藤原千花はテストしたい)	Takayuki Kikuchi	Yukie Sugawara	February 16, 2019
6	6	"Kaguya Wants to Be Noticed"; Transliteration: "Kaguya-sama wa Kizukaretai" (Japanese: かぐや様は気づかれたい)	Takayuki Kikuchi	Yukie Sugawara	February 16, 2019
Yu Ishigami, the introverted Treasurer of the Student Council, asks Miyuki if he can resign his position, suspecting that Kaguya wants to kill him after he asked her if she was in love with Miyuki. Chika gives the other Student Council members a psych test from a magazine, but Kaguya plans ahead to turn it into an advantage over Miyuki. Ai Hayasaka, Kaguya's personal assistant and schoolmate, tries to improve Kaguya's personal image by doing her nails, making her feel extra self-conscious the next day.
7	7	"Miyuki Shirogane Wants to Work"; Transliteration: "Shirogane Miyuki wa Hatarakitai" (Japanese: 白銀御行は働きたい)	Yūjirō Abe	Yasuhiro Nakanishi	February 23, 2019
7	7	"Kaguya Wants Him to Join In"; Transliteration: "Kaguya-sama wa Iretai" (Japanese: かぐや様は入れたい)	Yūjirō Abe	Yasuhiro Nakanishi	February 23, 2019
7	7	"Kaguya Wants to Control It"; Transliteration: "Kaguya-sama wa Taetai" (Japanese: かぐや様は堪えたい)	Yūjirō Abe	Yasuhiro Nakanishi	February 23, 2019
Nagisa's boyfriend returns to Miyuki, seeking advice on how to hold hands with his girlfriend. The Student Council discusses budgeting for various school clubs. Kaguya can't stop laughing at Chika's mention of the word "wiener".
8	8	"Kaguya Wants Her to Say It"; Transliteration: "Kaguya-sama wa Yobasetai" (Japanese: かぐや様は呼ばせたい)	Tarō Kubo	Yasuhiro Nakanishi	March 2, 2019
8	8	"Miyuki Shirogane Can't Lose"; Transliteration: "Shirogane Miyuki wa Makerarenai" (Japanese: 白銀御行は負けられない)	Tarō Kubo	Yasuhiro Nakanishi	March 2, 2019
8	8	"Yu Ishigami Closes His Eyes"; Transliteration: "Soshite Ishigami Yū wa Me o Tojita" (Japanese: そして石上優は目を閉じた)	Tarō Kubo	Yasuhiro Nakanishi	March 2, 2019
Kaguya attempts to befriend Miyuki's younger sister, Kei, but discovers she gets along better with the other council members. Kaguya and Miyuki battle for the number one academic position in the school's final exams. During the week before, noticing Ishigami is on the verge of failing his classes, Kaguya tutors him, although Ishigami perceives of her methods as torture.
9	9	"Kaguya Wants to Give a Gift"; Transliteration: "Kaguya-sama wa Okuritai" (Japanese: かぐや様は送りたい)	Masakazu Obara	Yukie Sugawara	March 9, 2019
9	9	"Chika Fujiwara Wants to Pay a Visit"; Transliteration: "Fujiwara Chika wa Mimaitai" (Japanese: 藤原千花は見舞いたい)	Masakazu Obara	Yukie Sugawara	March 9, 2019
9	9	"About Kaguya Shinomiya, Part 1"; Transliteration: "Shinomiya Kaguya ni tsuite 1" (Japanese: 四宮かぐやについて①)	Masakazu Obara	Yukie Sugawara	March 9, 2019
When a typhoon hits the area, Kaguya tries to trick Miyuki into asking her for a ride home, but gets a cold standing out in the rain waiting for him. Next day, the remaining Student Council members play a game of Concentration to find out who will visit Kaguya's home, but Miyuki notices Chika playing with a marked deck of cards and another underhanded tactic that he uses to his advantage. Miyuki comes to visit Kaguya at her sickbed, but is encouraged by a disguised Ai to spend some uninterrupted private time with Kaguya.
10	10	"Kaguya Won't Forgive"; Transliteration: "Kaguya-sama wa Yurusenai" (Japanese: かぐや様は許せない)	Tsuyoshi Tobita	Yasuhiro Nakanishi	March 16, 2019
10	10	"Kaguya Wants to Forgive"; Transliteration: "Kaguya-sama wa Yurushitai" (Japanese: かぐや様は許したい)	Tsuyoshi Tobita	Yasuhiro Nakanishi	March 16, 2019
10	10	"Miyuki Shirogane Wants to Go Somewhere"; Transliteration: "Shirogane Miyuki wa Dekaketai" (Japanese: 白銀御行は出かけたい)	Tsuyoshi Tobita	Yasuhiro Nakanishi	March 16, 2019
After the events of the previous day, Kaguya and Miyuki both fight over the last piece of cake, trying to make the other eat it. Kaguya and Miyuki secretly seek advice from Nagisa and Yu (respectively) on how to forgive the other for their recent actions. The Student Council revisits their summer vacation plans and agrees to go to a summer festival and watch the fireworks.
11	11	"Ai Hayasaka Wants to Get Soaked"; Transliteration: "Hayasaka Ai wa Tsukaritai" (Japanese: 早坂愛は浸かりたい)	Aya Ikeda	Yasuhiro Nakanishi	March 23, 2019
11	11	"Chika Fujiwara Really Wants to Eat It"; Transliteration: "Fujiwara Chika wa Chō Tabetai" (Japanese: 藤原千花は超食べたい)	Aya Ikeda	Yasuhiro Nakanishi	March 23, 2019
11	11	"Miyuki Shirogane Wants to See You"; Transliteration: "Shirogane Miyuki wa Deaitai" (Japanese: 白銀御行は出会いたい)	Aya Ikeda	Yasuhiro Nakanishi	March 23, 2019
11	11	"I Can't Hear the Fireworks, Part 1"; Transliteration: "Hanabi no Oto wa Kikoenai, Zenpen" (Japanese: 花火の音は聞こえない 前編)	Aya Ikeda	Yasuhiro Nakanishi	March 23, 2019
Ai tries to enjoy her bath but Kaguya keeps interrupting her with questions about Twitter. Chika comes back from her world trip with her family and flashes back to a ramen shop she visited. Miyuki and Kaguya both struggle to invite the other out during the summer. Kaguya reminisces about her childhood and her father's lack of attention.
12	12	"I Can't Hear the Fireworks, Part 2"; Transliteration: "Hanabi no Oto wa Kikoenai, Kōhen" (Japanese: 花火の音は聞こえない 後編)	Takayuki Kikuchi	Yukie Sugawara	March 30, 2019
12	12	"Kaguya Doesn't Want to Avoid Him"; Transliteration: "Kaguya-sama wa Saketakunai" (Japanese: かぐや様は避けたくない)	Shinichi Omata	Yukie Sugawara	March 30, 2019
Kaguya's father bans Kaguya from going to the summer festival, so Ai launches a plot with the rest of the Student Council to sneak Kaguya outside to see the fireworks in person. After the events of the festival, Kaguya and Miyuki are too self-conscious to speak to one another.
