= Squeak piggy squeak =

Children's and party game

Squeak piggy squeak is a parlour game that is sometimes called grunt piggy grunt, or oink piggy oink. It is a variation of blind man's buff and was popular in the Victorian era.

To play the game, one player is chosen to be the "farmer"; the others are the piggies. The farmer is blindfolded and holds a pillow. All other players then sit in a circle surrounding the farmer. The farmer is spun around three times and then has to make their way to the piggies, place the pillow on the lap of the chosen piggy without touching the piggy with their hands (to maintain the anonymity of the piggy), and sit down, squashing the piggy. The farmer then says "Squeak piggy squeak." When the chosen piggy squeaks, the farmer has to guess the name of the player on whom they are sitting. If the farmer guesses correctly, the piggy becomes the farmer in the next round. If the guess is incorrect, then the farmer remains to be spun again for the next round. The piggies all switch chairs so that the farmer will not know who is sitting where. Instead of "Squeak piggy squeak," any other animal sound can be substituted, like "Moo cow moo," or even "Roar lion roar."

Another variation is to eliminate players. The farmer is spun three times, points in front of them and says 'Oink piggy pink', and the piggy facing them must squeal. If the farmer guesses correctly, that piggy is out of the game and the farmer becomes a piggy. The eliminated piggy chooses another piggy to become the farmer. If the farmer is incorrect, they are out of the game, and the piggy who squealed becomes the farmer. This continues until only one farmer and one piggy remain. At this time there's no need for the farmer to guess who the piggy is. The two remaining players are the winners.

The title of the game is used in the media, often to establish a satiric tone in political pieces.
