= Sophie's Choice =

Sophie's Choice may refer to:

- Sophie's Choice (novel), a 1979 novel by American author William Styron
  - Sophie's Choice (film), a 1982 American drama film directed by Alan J. Pakula
  - Sophie's Choice (opera), an opera by the British composer Nicholas Maw

== See also ==
- "Sophia's Choice", an episode of season 4 of The Golden Girls
