= Couch of power =

Game

- Players: 8+ (ideally an even number)
- Setup time: < 5 minutes
- Playing time: 15–45 minutes
- Chance: Low
- Age range: All ages
- Skills: Strategic thinking Teamwork; Memory

Couch of power is a group game of strategy and memory in which two teams shuffle seats until one team controls every seat on the couch and wins. It is sometimes known as "Parliament" or "Four on the Couch".

== Equipment ==
- Seats arranged in a circle. There must be one seat for each player and one empty seat.
- A couch, which can be a real couch (which would replace four seats) or four adjacent seats.
- Internet. 4onacouch.com
- Slips of paper if internet is not available - the same amount as people playing. Each slip has the name of one of the players, so that every player is named on one slip.

== Objective ==
The game is won by the team who fills the couch with their own players.

== How to play ==
It's player A's turn. They can move player B from the couch to the empty seat.

Now it's C's turn. They can move a teammate to the empty seat on the couch and win the game.

Divide the players into two teams. The game works best if the teams are even. To avoid later confusion, instruct one team to distinguish themselves from the other team by wearing headbands, rolling up their pants legs or shirt sleeves, etc. – boys vs. girls may work. Hand out the slips of paper with players' names; it doesn't matter if you have your own name. Everyone should have one slip, with no extras.

Teams then alternate seats (i.e., no two team members are sitting next to each other) so that two people from each team are on the couch and there is one empty seat. Play begins with the player left (or clockwise) of the empty seat.

The player calls a name, and whoever has that name on their slip must move to the empty seat, making their former seat the new empty seat.

To make the game particularly challenging, every time someone moves to the empty seat, they should exchange slips of paper with the person who called their name (now on their left). Now everyone will know what the person who called the name has, but will not know what the person who moved has (unless said earlier in the game).

Play always passes to the player to the left of the empty seat. The same name cannot be called twice in a row, and you cannot call the name that is on your slip of paper.

When all four people on the couch are from the same team, the game is over and that team wins.

== Basic strategy ==
Players can focus on moving the ideal person to the ever-changing empty seat, keeping in mind that the person sitting to the left of a vacated seat will be the next to play. Like chess, this requires some ability to think ahead.
