= Musical statues =

Children's party game

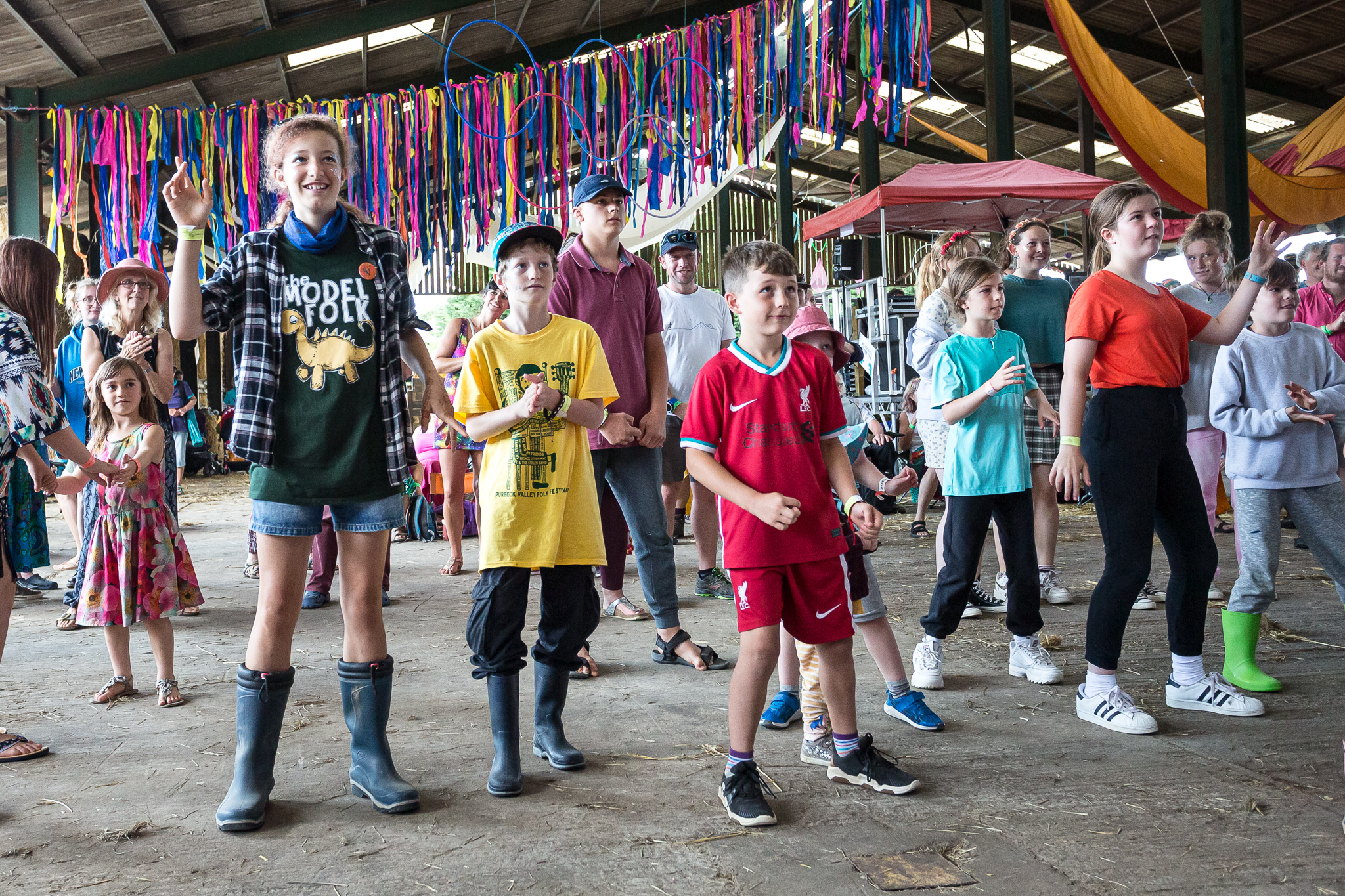
- Children playing musical statues
- Other names: Freeze dance (USA), statue dance/stop dance (Philippines)
- Players: Variable
- Setup time: 1 minute
- Playing time: Variable
- Chance: Music stoppage may seem random to players, but is under the control of the leader
- Age range: Usually children
- Skills: Quick reaction time, ability to stand completely still

Musical statues is a game played at children's birthday parties. Originating from the United Kingdom, the game is similar to musical chairs and is part of the "Jerusalem games", of which elimination is an element. It is also known as freeze dance in the United States and statue dance in Philippines.

== Rules ==
Players stand in an area, usually a dance hall, with one person controlling the music. When the music starts the players should dance along to it, and when it stops, they must freeze in position. Any player moving or laughing while the music has stopped is out of the game. Play continues until there is only one person left, who will be announced as the winner.

== Variations ==
In the newspaper dance game, players must dance on a sheet of newspaper without stepping off of it. Whenever the music stops and players freeze, the pieces of newspaper are torn in half to a smaller size. For another version, pairs of players dance around the sheet, which they must step on as the music stops; the newspaper being folded to smaller sizes as the game progresses.

In the traffic light game, players run around pretending to be vehicles, and must freeze when the game runner shouts "red!"

== World record ==
The world record for musical statues was set on 16 August 2013. Over 1,500 students at Mansfield State High School in Brisbane, Australia, participated in the event.

== In popular culture ==
In the opening credits to the Australian children's animated series Bluey, the characters play a game of musical statues.
