= Icebreaker (facilitation) =

Form of brief facilitating exercise

An icebreaker is a brief facilitation exercise intended to help members of a group begin the process of working together or forming a team. They are commonly presented as games to "warm up" a group by helping members get to know each other and often focus on sharing personal information such as names or hobbies.

Although they have become popular over the years, there are a number of people who dislike them.

== Purpose ==
An icebreaker should be related to the subject or the purpose of the meeting. For example, if a collaborative learning environment is needed for a training project, then an icebreaker exercise that promotes collaboration could be chosen. If the subject of the meeting is literature, then the subject of the meeting could be introduced through an exercise that revolves around a participant's favourite books. Most icebreakers should promote an appropriate level of self-disclosure, as this builds trust between participants in the group and helps develop group cohesiveness.

Icebreakers should be relaxing and non-threatening. For example, icebreakers in a professional setting should not require people to reveal personal information or to touch other people, as this may be stressful or culturally inappropriate. They should not embarrass the participants or make them feel compelled to participate. They should also not show disrespect for any social and professional hierarchies in the group, as this can be uncomfortable for participants. A simple activity without right or wrong answers can reduce anxiety for people who are in a new situation or an unfamiliar group of people.

The icebreaker should allow people to experience the behaviors that are expected or desired within the group. For example, if the main group activities will use rigid turn-taking during discussions, then the ice breaker should model rigid turn-taking. An icebreaker can help people understand whether this will be a psychologically safe group that will accept different opinions.

At the end of a well-executed icebreaker exercise, the facilitator should be able to summarize for the group what was learned during the exercise or what the purpose of the icebreaker was.

== Reactions ==
Icebreakers are often disliked, but having participants feel awkward or think that the exercise is unpleasant does not impair their effectiveness in bringing individuals closer together.

People who dislike icebreakers may be reacting to previous experience with irrelevant, pointless, or poorly designed icebreakers, which can feel like a waste of time. Participants may also show aspects of their personality, as people with different personalities respond differently to the same exercise.

== Types ==
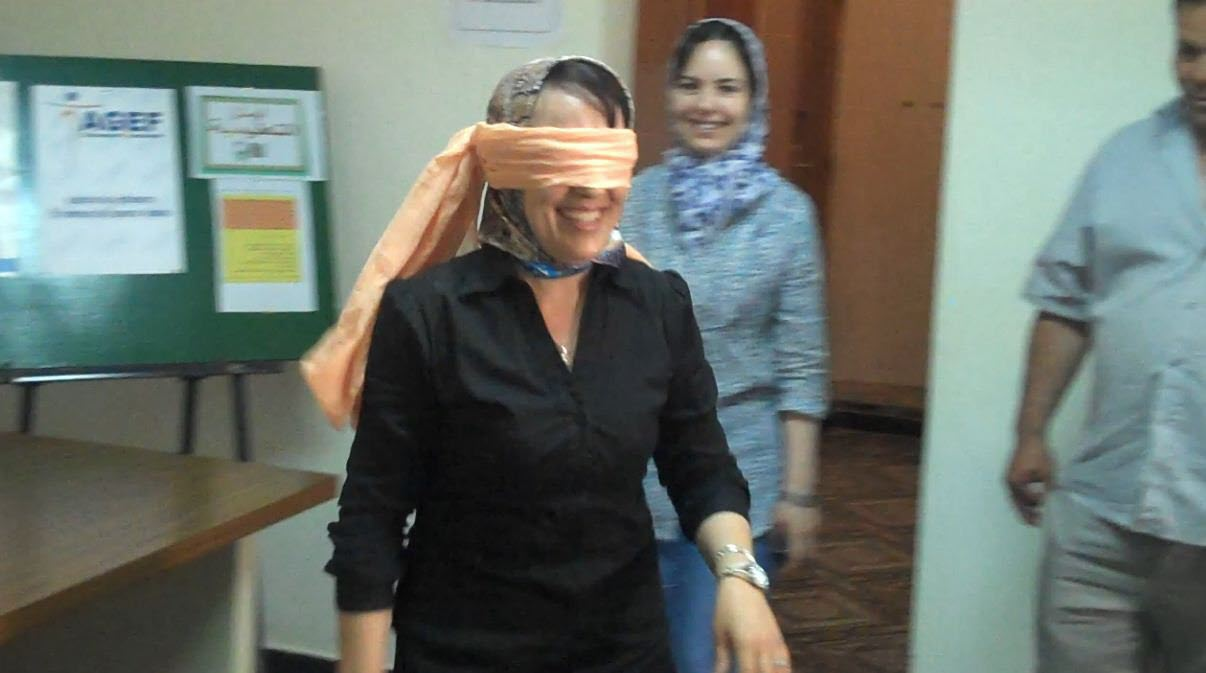
A team-building icebreaker game where the group guide a blindfolded player to find and pick up a plastic cup

There are many different types of icebreakers. Some of the most common are:

Introductory icebreakers
Often, when people get together for the first time, they do not all know one another. Introductory icebreaker games and activities not only help people begin to know each other, but also help them recognize and appreciate differences and similarities. Introductory icebreakers can be as simple as asking each person to tell the group their name and one fact about themselves, or they can be complicated exercises designed to build trust and a desire to work together.
Getting-to-know-you icebreakers
Icebreakers are frequently presented in the form of a game to “warm up” a group by helping the members to get to know each other. They often focus on sharing information such as names, personal facts, hobbies, etc. Getting to know you icebreakers also help people who already know each other become more acquainted.
Team-building icebreakers
Many icebreaker games are intended to help a group to begin the process of forming themselves into a team or teams. Some teamwork icebreakers, such as building activities, aid group dynamics by building trust, communication, and the ability to work together.
Party (fun) icebreakers
Party icebreakers introduce guests to one another. Use icebreakers that are simple and entertaining to coax people to converse and laugh. This sets the right mood for the rest of the party.
Icebreaker questions
As the name implies, icebreaker questions simply elicit information from people in an effort to get them comfortable and relaxed. Icebreaker questions can be serious or funny. The best icebreaker questions are designed specifically for an identified age and purpose and prepare people for activities or experiences that follow.

== Warm-up exercises ==
Examples of warm-up exercises include:

Little-known fact
Participants are asked to share their name, role in the group, length of service, and one "little-known fact" about themselves. This "little-known fact" becomes a humanizing element for future interactions.
Two truths and a lie
Each participant makes three statements about themselves. Two statements are true, and one is untrue. Other group members try to identify the falsehood.
Mingle, Mingle, Mingle
Ask everyone to walk around the room in one direction, saying the word 'mingle' over and over. The facilitator then shouts a number. The participants try to form groups of that number (e.g., groups of four people, if the facilitator said "four"). The facilitator commiserates with any not in a group and then starts the process again.
Interviews
Participants are paired up and spend five minutes interviewing each other. The group reconvenes and the interviewer introduces the interviewee to the group.

The exercises are particularly popular in the university setting, for instance among residents of a residence hall or groups of students who will be working closely together, such as orientation leaders or peer health teachers.

== Group interaction exercises ==
Challenging icebreakers also have the ability to allow a group to be better prepared to complete its assigned tasks. For example, if the team's objective is to redesign a business process such as Accounts Payable, the icebreaker activity might take the team through a process analysis. The analysis could include the identification of failure points, challenging assumptions and development of new solutions — all in a "simpler and safer" setting where the team can practice the group dynamics they will use to solve assigned problems.

Two examples of group interaction exercises are:

Ball Exercise
Immediately after introductions, the facilitator arranges the group in a circle and asks each person to throw a ball to a participant on the other side of the circle while stating their name. When every person in the group has thrown the ball at least once, the facilitator announces that the exercise will be repeated (but with it being timed) and announces the rules.
- Each person must touch the ball in the same order as the first round.
- Each person must touch the ball with at least one hand.
- Time stops when the ball is returned to the facilitator. (For further complication, the facilitator will sometimes introduce three balls in succession to the process.) Regardless of their performance, the facilitator expresses disappointment with the group's performance and urges them to repeat it faster. When asked for clarification, the facilitator only reiterates the rules. An effective team will creatively redesign their process to meet the requirements of the rules. After several iterations, the facilitator will call a halt and use the exercise to draw out morals which will be relevant later in the day such as challenging assumptions, dissatisfaction with the first answer, or being creative.
Human Spiderweb
The facilitator begins with a ball of yarn. He/she keeps one end and passes the ball to a participant. Each participant introduces him/herself and role in the group, then, keeping hold of the strand of yarn, unrolls enough to hand the ball to another person in the group, describing how they are dependent on that person (or role). The process continues, often with multiple dependencies until everyone is introduced. The facilitator then pulls on the starting thread and asks the group if anyone's hand failed to move. The facilitator then uses the yarn as a metaphor for the interdependencies of the group or the process to be discussed.

== See also ==
- Diversity Icebreaker
- Group-dynamic game
- Forming-storming-norming-performing
- Conversation games
