= Fizz buzz =

Group word game to teach mathematical division

Fizz buzz is a group word game for children to teach them about division. Players take turns to count incrementally, replacing any number divisible by three with the word "fizz", and any number divisible by five with the word "buzz", and any number divisible by both three and five with the word "fizzbuzz".

== Play ==
Players generally sit in a circle. The player designated to go first says the number "one", and the players then count upwards in turn. A player who hesitates or makes a mistake is eliminated.

For example, a typical round of fizz buzz would start as follows:

1, 2, Fizz, 4, Buzz, Fizz, 7, 8, Fizz, Buzz, 11, Fizz, 13, 14, Fizzbuzz, 16, 17, Fizz, 19, Buzz, Fizz, 22, 23, Fizz, Buzz, 26, Fizz, 28, 29, Fizzbuzz, 31, 32, Fizz, 34, Buzz, Fizz, 37, ...

== Other variations ==
In some versions of the game, other divisibility rules such as 7 can be used instead. Another rule that may be used to complicate the game is where numbers containing a digit also trigger the corresponding rule (for instance, 52 would use the same rule for a number divisible by 5).

== Programming ==
Fizz buzz (often spelled FizzBuzz in this context) has been used as an interview screening device for computer programmers. Writing a program to output the first 100 FizzBuzz numbers is a relatively trivial problem requiring little more than a loop and conditional statements in any popular language, and is thus a quick way to weed out applicants with absolutely no programming experience.
