= Quiet game =

Children's game

The quiet game is a children's game where children must stay quiet. Stillness is sometimes a rule but in most cases not. The last child or team to make noise wins the game. It is usually acceptable for players to make sounds they cannot control, such as sneezing or coughing whereas talking would cause a player to get out. The game is often played indoors, typically in classrooms. It can also be played outdoors, for instance, at summer camps. One application of the game is for parents to keep their loud children quiet for a long journey.

There are many versions of this game, which all follow the same general rules: one who talks is immediately eliminated, eventually isolating the winner at the end. Sometimes played by only excluding verbal language rather than all sounds.

The children's game quaker meeting is a version of the game that starts with a spoken rhyme such as "Quaker meeting has begun; No more laughing, no more fun. If you show your teeth or tongue, you must pay a forfeit." In Ireland, a similar game is called "Silence in the Courtyard", opened with the rhyme "Silence in the courtyard, silence in the street, the biggest fool in Ireland is just about to speak. No laughing, no crying, no showing off you teeth, starting from now."

== External sources ==
- Creating Readers: Over 1000 Games, Activities, Tongue Twisters, Fingerplays, Songs, and Stories to Get Children Excited about Reading by Pam Schiller, Gryphon House, Beltsville, Maryland (2001). 447 pages. ISBN 0-87659-258-2.
