= Utter Nonsense! =

Card game played by a judge and players

Utter Nonsense! is a comical card game played by a judge and players.

== History ==
The game was created by Tim Swindle and Dave Mazurek. When they were classmates in college, they would at times play with their folks a game of reciting sentences in a variety of accents. Later in 2014, after playing Cards Against Humanity, they decided to create their college past time into a real game. After several copies were retailed by a local game shop, their game was picked up by Target which further marketed it.

== Equipment ==
The game is played with 500 cards: 455 contain sentences, and 45 naming a particular accent.

== Game play ==
The players select a judge based on whose breath is the most repulsive. Determining who has such a breath doesn't have to be factual but can involve absurd reasons.

At the start of each round, the judge deals seven sentence cards to the other players. The judge then takes an accent card from the top of its deck, and reveals it.

The player on the left side of the judge gets the first turn, then the one on the player's left side, and so on. Each player selects a sentence card from his/her hand, and recites it in the accent given.

After all the players have recited, the judge decides whose recitation he/she thinks is the most comical. The player whose recitation is chosen wins the round, keeps the round's accent card, and becomes the next judge. Play goes on until one player wins an assigned number of rounds (usually five).
