= Forty forty =

Children's game

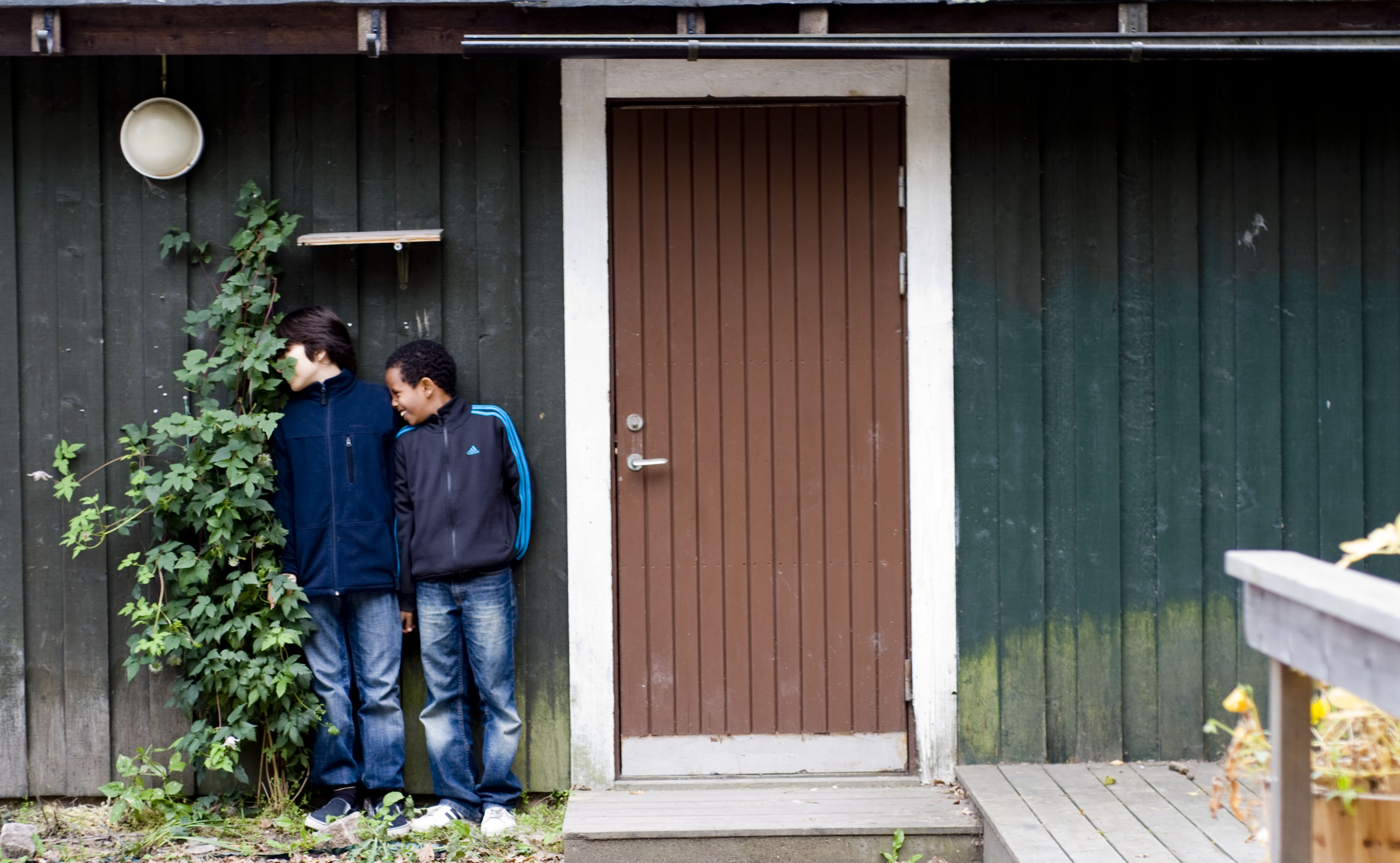
Players attempt to reach a home base without being seen

Forty Forty (also known as 123 Home, Forty Forty In, Mob Mob, Mob and other names) is a children's game combining elements of the games "It" and Hide and seek. One player is "on", or "It", and they must capture the other players by 'spying' them rather than by tagging as there is no physical contact with another player.

== Rules ==
A player is chosen as "It" and a landmark such as a tree or lamppost is chosen as the base, this is sometimes called “the mob post”. Players who are not "It" run and hide, while "It" counts to a certain number depending on the version of the game; usually 40, 44 or 100. "It" looks for the other players, while the players try to get to base without being seen.

If a player gets to base without being seen, they shout "forty forty I'm free", "forty forty home", "forty forty save myself", "forty forty in", “save myself 123” and are then safe, waiting at base for the remainder of the game and do not help “It” in the search for other players. In order to catch someone, "It" must see the person, run back, touch the base and say "forty forty I see [name]" or “mob mob [name] 123”. If the "seen" player is behind or in an object, it must be specified; e.g. "forty forty I see [name] behind that tree" while pointing at it.

Players that are caught by the "It" return to base. The first person to be caught by the end of the game is "It" for the next game. Some variants make the last person caught "It" for the next game.

There are variants to allow players to be freed. In some variants, a player reaching base can say "Release, one, two, three" or a similar chant to release one or all captured players. If the last player reaches the base without being spied, they can chant a variant of 'Save everyone/all 123', and all the players are freed to play again.

== Ping Pong ==
In one variant, the initial "It" is selected by a system known as Ping Pong. All those playing stand in a circle, holding out arms so that their index fingers touch whilst a designated selector says either "Ping", (zero, once or repeatedly as they see fit) or "Pong". Once the designated selector says "Pong", everyone breaks formation hurriedly as the first person that the designated selector can touch becomes "It". If the designated selector is unable to touch someone by lunging or by sleight of hand to the right or the left, the designated selector is free to pursue one or more of the fleeing circle that has just broken formation. However, if someone wrongfully breaks prematurely, i.e. before "Pong" is said, then the forfeit is that they are "It".

== Other names ==
The game is known by many names, including Acky 123, 44 home, Block 123, Relievo 123, Hicky 123, Rally 123, Pom Pom, twenty-twenty (or any other number), Tip the Can, home and I-Erkey
