= Psychiatrist (game) =

Party game

Psychiatrist (also known as Psycho) is a party game in which all but one player takes the role of a patient with the same problem, and the remaining player is a psychiatrist who must diagnose them with a series of indirect questions.

== Gameplay ==
The players sit in a circle, with one player sitting in the center of the circle. The player in the center is the "psychiatrist", and the players in the circle are the "patients". Before the game starts, the patients must agree on a common affliction, such as being afraid of the dark, or believing themselves to be a particular film star. The psychiatrist must leave the room while this affliction is discussed and decided.

The psychiatrist then returns, and attempts to diagnose the collective illness by asking indirect questions to each patient in turn ("Do you prefer the daytime or the nighttime?" rather than "Is your illness related to light?"). Patients can convey hints in their behavior as much as their answers.

If a patient gives an answer which is inconsistent with the agreed affliction, or is a lie, the other patients should shout "Psychiatrist!", and the answering patient swaps seats with the patient who shouted first. This game mechanic may be invoked voluntarily if the psychiatrist's questions are being too direct - for example, if the psychiatrist has worked out that the shared delusion is that of being a film star and asks one of the patients "What is your name?", that patient may choose to lie, knowing that another will then shout "Psychiatrist!"

The game continues until the psychiatrist correctly identifies the patients' ailment.

== Variants ==
A different version, popular on college campuses, is similar but also bears certain resemblances to the drinking game I Never and the card game Mao. In this version, as before, participants sit in a circle while one person leaves the room. The circle then decides on a pattern, such as "the person sitting to my right". Upon re-entering, the person who left the room (the "psychiatrist") must then guess the pattern by choosing someone from the circle and asking them a personal question. The person must then answer for the person that the pattern dictates - in the example given above, everyone would answer for the person to their right, to the best of their knowledge. For example, if a player is wearing red socks, and the person to their right is wearing blue socks, the player's answer to the question "Are you wearing blue socks?" would be "Yes".

The questions do not have to be limited to yes/no questions, and generally tend to become more and more personal and risqué as the game progresses. If a player answers a question incorrectly, anyone who knows that the answer is incorrect shouts "Psychiatrist!" and everyone switches places. The true purpose of the game is to discover interesting and usually ribald information about the players, and also to discover how much people really know about each other.

Sometimes, the first time that the game is played in an evening, the Psychiatrist will not even be told that there is a pattern, and must deduce the nature of the game as well as the pattern. With a Psychiatrist who already knows how to play, the pattern tends to be quite esoteric ("the first person to your left who is a different gender but shares your hair color").
