= Conversation games =

Type of game

Conversation games, also known as verbal games or spoken games, are games that require only conversational ability and no other paraphernalia. Conversation games owe their popularity to their ability to be played almost anywhere with almost anyone and for their ability to generate conversation. Their popularity has gained in part due to the hip hop culture and TV shows like Wild 'N Out and Yo Momma. They can often also be categorized as guessing games, word games, or because of their freedom from equipment or visual engagement, car games. Because of their nature, conversation games are usually non-commercial. Hand games such as Where Are Your Keys? may also be considered conversational through its use of sign language.

== Examples ==
The Dozens
A game originating from Hip-hop culture where players verbally spar in an attempt to entertainingly insult one another. Related to "your mom" jokes.
I spy
Guessing game where one player thinks of an item that can be seen nearby, and others guess it.
Never Have I Ever
A drinking game in which a person makes a statement in the form of "I have never X". All people who have done X must then drink. Often people try to craft questions in order to find out interesting information about others.
Psychiatrist
a handful of players sit (the "patients") in a circle and one leaves the room (the "psychiatrist"). The "patients" sitting in the circle then agree on a fictitious psychiatric condition that they all have in common. The "psychiatrist" then comes back into the room and assumes the role of psychiatrist and quizzes the group in order to find out what the condition is. The psychiatrist may not inquire about the psychiatric condition itself, but may ask any other questions. For instance, the group may agree that they all believe they are the person sitting to their right, and when the psychiatrist returns into the room, they behave with the mannerisms of that person, and answers the psychiatrist's questions in the way they imagine the person to their right would.
Twenty Questions
A two-player game in which one person has a noun in mind and the other player is allowed to ask twenty yes/no questions to try to guess the noun.
Two Truths and a Lie
The player in the hot seat makes three statements about their life or experiences, of which two are true and one is false. The other players must interrogate them for further details about the three statements; the hot-seated player must tell the truth in connection with the two true statements, but may lie to conceal the falsity of the untrue statement. Other players have to guess which is the lie.
Would you rather
A game in which one player poses two scenarios, both equally revolting and dreadful, to another player who must then choose in which scenario they would rather find themselves. The challenge of the game is to not only come up with the horrific scenarios but find the advantages and disadvantages of each scenario and make a judgment call on which seems like the lesser of two horrors. There are many notably extreme examples of this, such as "Would you rather be homeless or be in prison?"
Questions
A game in which each player must respond with a question. Statements are out, repetition and rhetoric are not allowed. It was played by the title characters in Rosencrantz and Guildenstern Are Dead. In the film version, it was played in a tennis court.
Truth or dare?
Players ask one another whether they want to answer a question truthfully or perform a "dare." The game-master asks the person to their right "truth or dare," followed by the player choosing either a truth or a dare.
Mafia (party game)
A social deduction game played between 5 or more people in which participants are divided in two groups, the mafia and citizens. Players try to guess who are the mafia.

== See also ==
- Drinking games
- Language games
- Party games
- Pub games
- Singing game
