= Road trip bingo =

Car trip game related to bingo

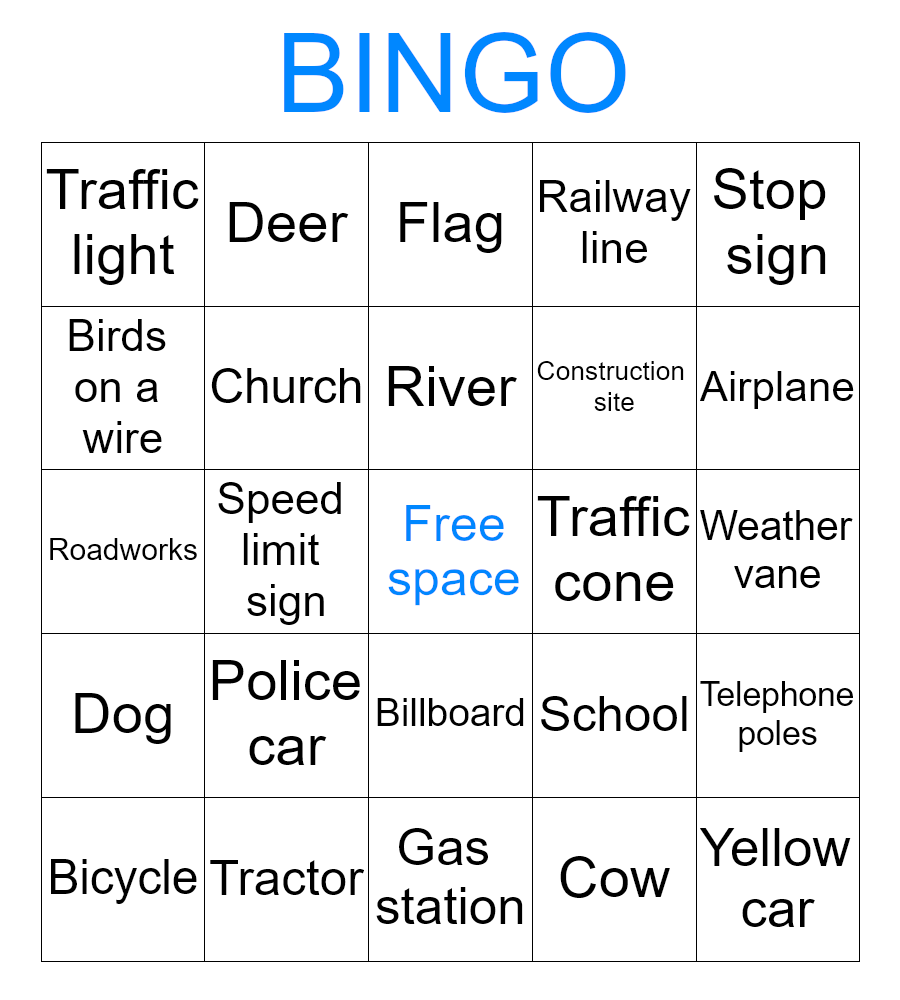
Example road trip bingo card

Road trip bingo is a game in the bingo family (American or British) used for long car rides or road trips. Commercial versions use sliding panels to mark off different things one would see on the road. Homemade versions might use a hand-drawn 5x5 grid.
