= Zip (game) =

Theatre preparation exercise game

Zip, sometimes known as zip zap boing or zip zap zop, is a game often used as a theatre preparation exercise and sometimes as an elimination game. The game structure is folkloric and has differing rules and names in different places. When used as an elimination game, often the last three remaining are usually considered the winners of the game.

== Rules ==
The rules of this game have many variations. The most basic form of the game involves a circle of people sending a "clap" or "impulse" or "ball of energy" to each other in turn, saying the word "zip" each time. Other moves such as "zap" send the clap in different directions.

Although almost every practitioner of the game uses a different set of rules, for illustrative purposes, below are the set of rules used by the UK Scout Association:

- Players stand in a circle, roughly two metres apart.
- Play is passed from one player to another by use of the actions "zip", "zap", and "boing":
  - Zip: A player clasps their hands with thumbs raised and index fingers pointing to an adjacent person in the circle and says "zip"; play passes to that person.
  - Zap: A player clasps their hands as in Zip, but pointing to any non-adjacent person in the circle, and says "zap"; play passes to that person.
  - Boing: A player performs a star jump and says "boing"; play passes back to the previous player.
- Players who make a mistake are eliminated.
- The game ends when there are only two players left.

Other rulesets may include actions like "Zoom", "Catch and Roll" and "Reflector".
