= Folklore =

Expressive culture shared by particular groups

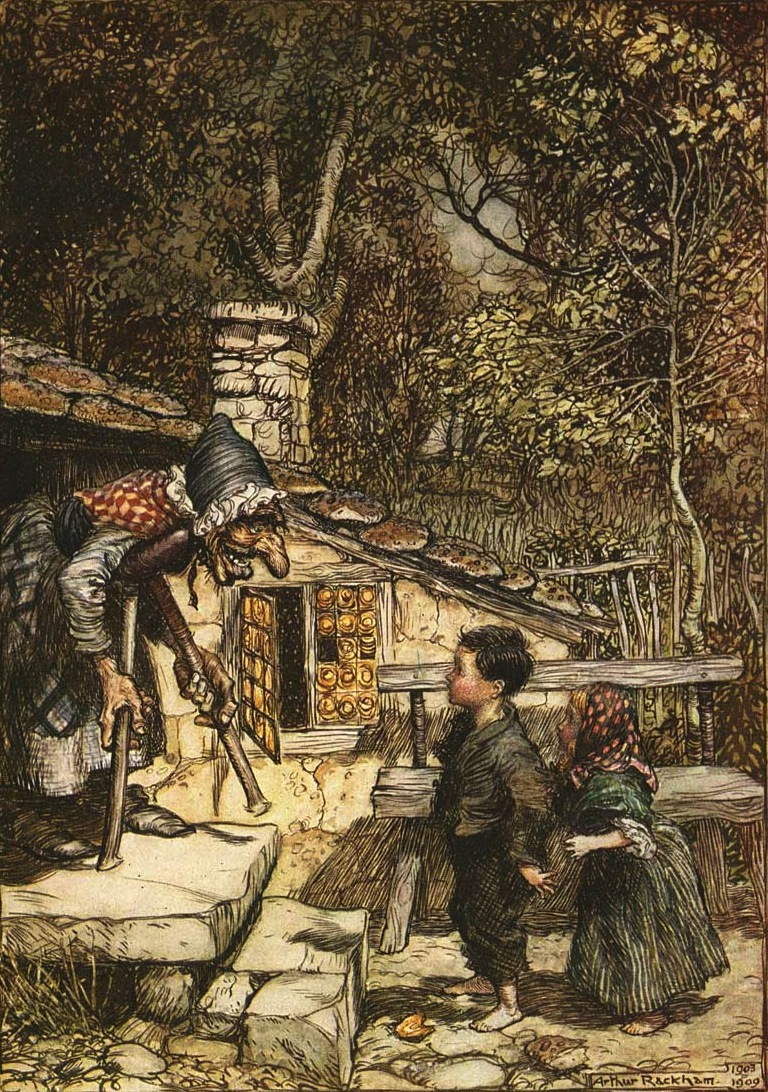
A German folk tale, Hansel and Gretel; illustration by Arthur Rackham, 1909

Folklore is the body of expressive culture shared by a particular group of people, culture or subculture. This includes oral traditions such as tales, legends, proverbs, poems, and jokes. This also includes material culture, such as traditional building styles common to the group. Folklore also encompasses customary lore, taking actions for folk beliefs, including folk religion, and the forms and rituals of celebrations such as festivals, weddings, folk dances, and initiation rites.

Each one of these, either singly or in combination, is considered a folklore artifact or traditional cultural expression. Just as essential as the form, folklore can also encompasses the transmission of these artifacts from one region to another or from one generation to the next. Folklore is not something one typically gains from a formal school curriculum or fine arts study. Instead, these traditions are passed along informally from one individual to another, either through verbal instruction or demonstration.

The academic study of folklore is called folklore studies or folkloristics, and it can be explored at the undergraduate, graduate, and Ph.D. levels.

== Overview ==
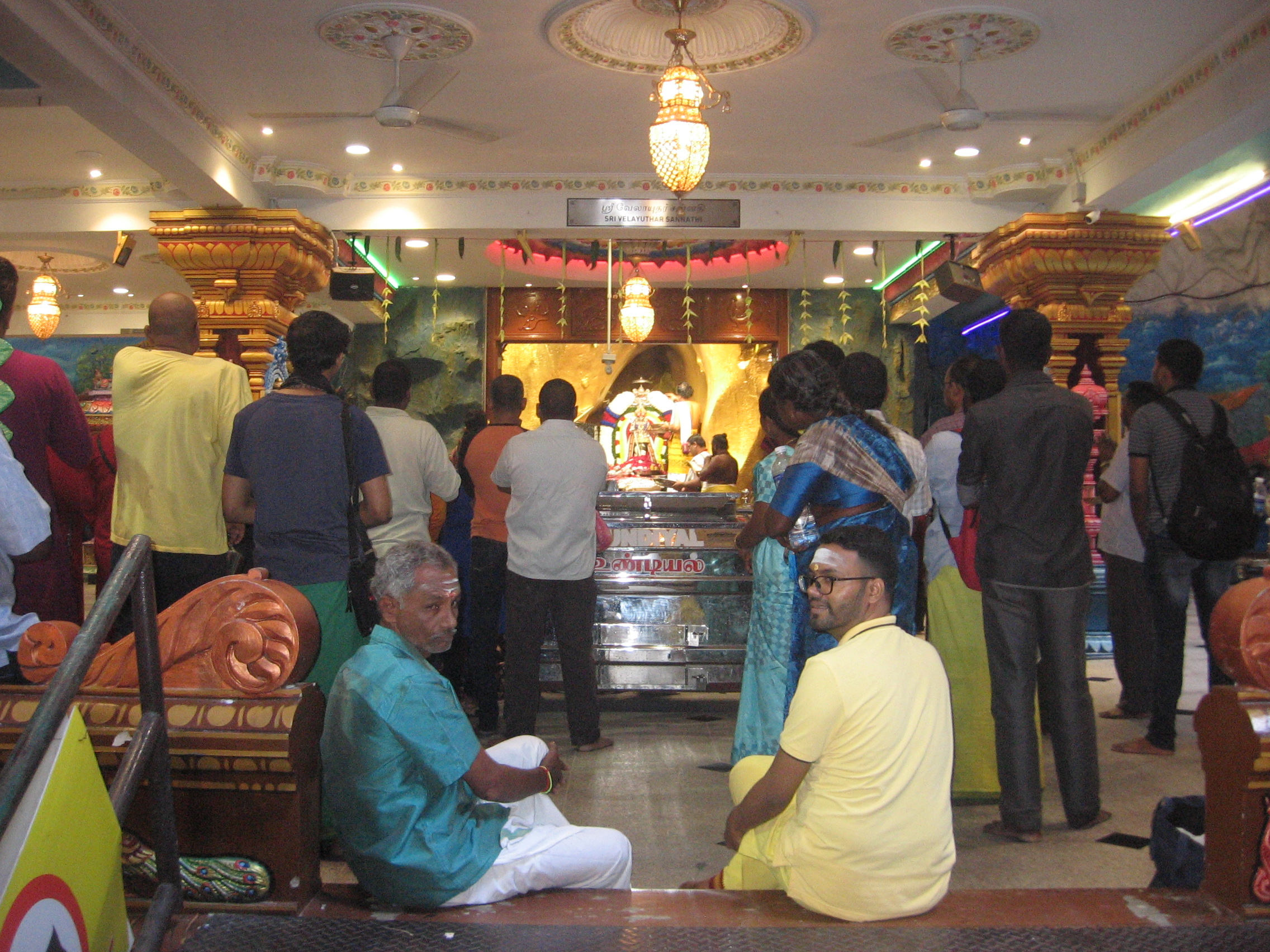
Indian Folk Worship at Batu Caves, Selangor, Malaysia

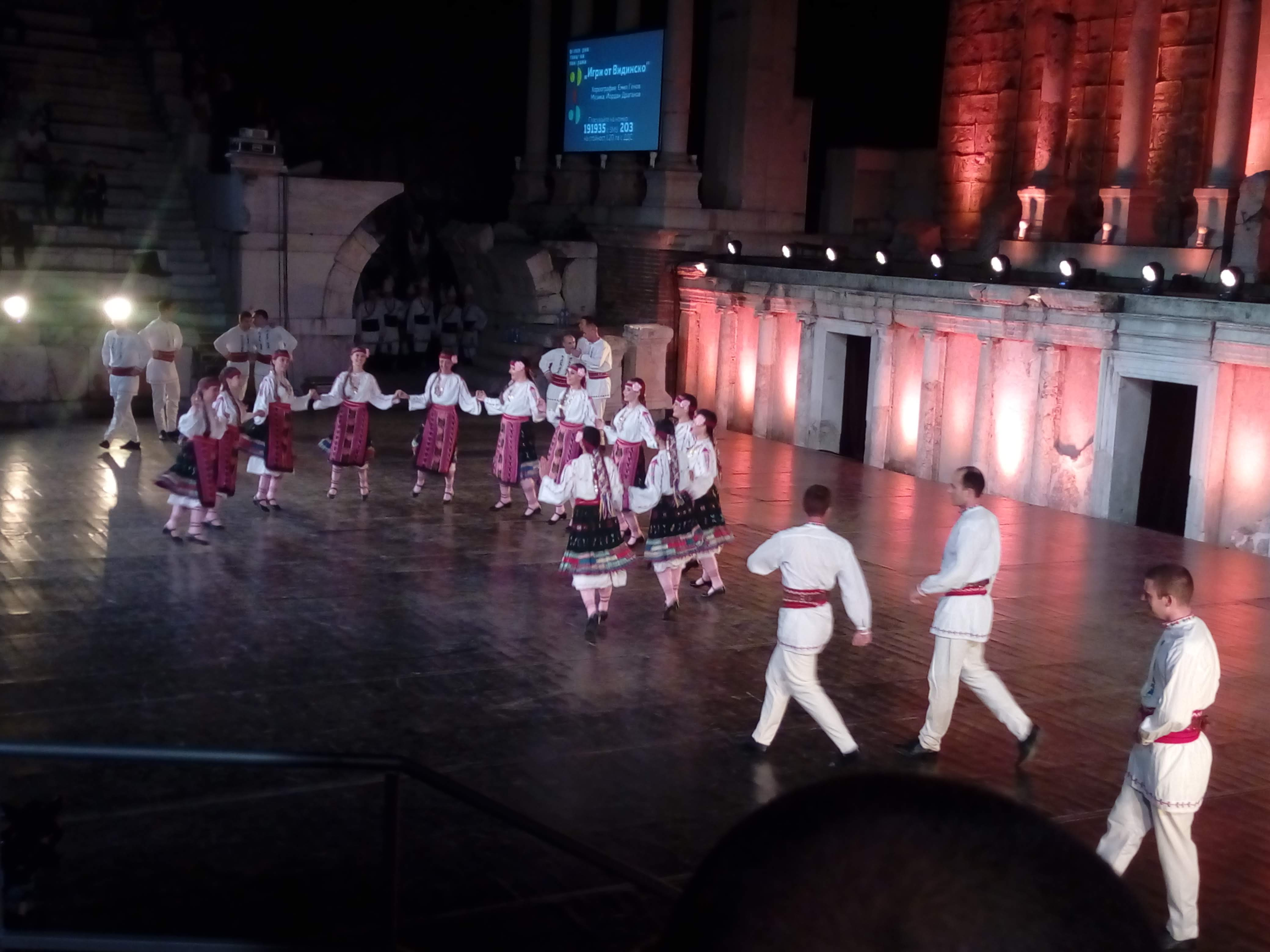
Folk dancing, Plovdiv, Bulgaria

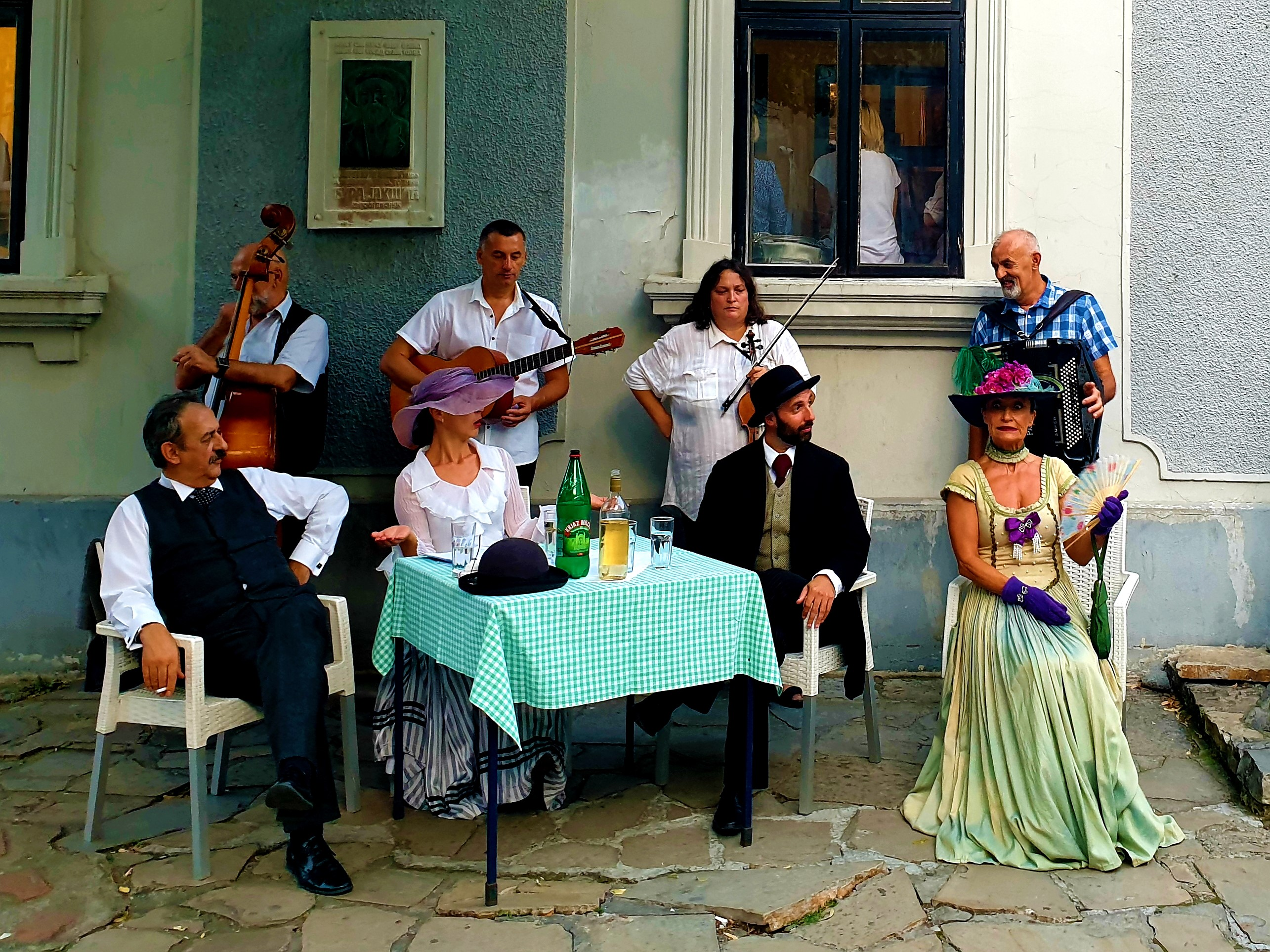
Serbian Folk Group, Music and Costume. A group of performers sharing traditional Serbian folk music on the streets of Belgrade, Serbia.

The word folklore, a compound of folk and lore, was coined in 1846 by the Englishman William Thoms, who devised the term as a replacement for the contemporary terminology of "popular antiquities" or "popular literature". The second half of the word, lore, comes from Old English lār 'instruction'. It is the knowledge and traditions of a particular group frequently passed along by word of mouth.

The concept of folk has varied over time. When Thoms first created this term, folk applied only to rural, frequently poor, and illiterate peasants. A more modern definition of folk is a social group that includes two or more people with common traits who express their shared identity through distinctive traditions. "Folk is a flexible concept which can refer to a nation as in American folklore or to a single family." This expanded social definition of folk supports a broader view of the material, i.e., the lore, considered to be folklore artifacts. These now include all "things people make with words (verbal lore), things they make with their hands (material lore), and things they make with their actions (customary lore)". Folklore is no longer considered to be limited to that which is old or obsolete. These folk artifacts continue to be passed along informally, as a rule anonymously, and always in multiple variants. The folk group is not individualistic; it is community-based and nurtures its lore in community. "As new groups emerge, new folklore is created… surfers, motorcyclists, computer programmers". In direct contrast to high culture, where any single work of a named artist is protected by copyright law, folklore is a function of shared identity within a common social group.

Having identified folk artifacts, the professional folklorist strives to understand the significance of these beliefs, customs, and objects for the group, since these cultural units would not be passed along unless they had some continued relevance within the group. That meaning can, however, shift and morph; for example, the Halloween celebration of the 21st century is not the All Hallows' Eve of the Middle Ages and even gives rise to its own set of urban legends independent of the historical celebration; the cleansing rituals of Orthodox Judaism were originally good public health in a land with little water, but now these customs signify for some people identification as an Orthodox Jew. By comparison, a common action such as tooth brushing, which is also transmitted within a group, remains a practical hygiene and health issue and does not rise to the level of a group-defining tradition. Tradition is initially remembered behavior; once it loses its practical purpose, there is no reason for further transmission unless it has been imbued with meaning beyond the initial practicality of the action. This meaning is at the core of folkloristics, the study of folklore.

With the increasing theoretical sophistication of the social sciences, it has become evident that folklore is a naturally occurring and necessary component of any social group; it is indeed all around us. Folklore does not have to be old or antiquated; it continues to be created and transmitted, and in any group, it is used to differentiate between "us" and "them."

== Origin and development of folklore studies ==
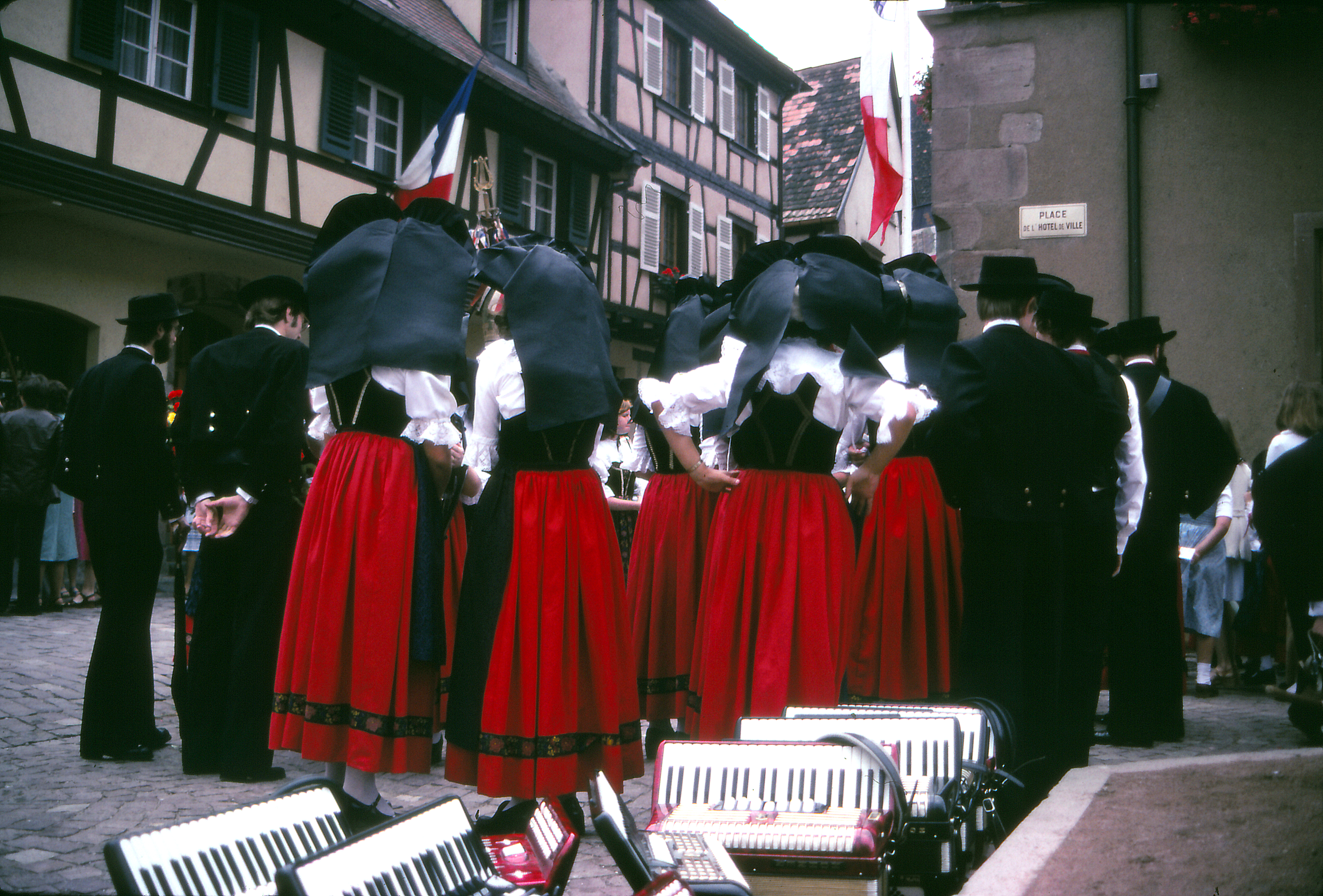
Typical Alsatian folk group from the town of Kaysersberg (Haut-Rhin - France).

Folklore began to distinguish itself as an autonomous discipline during the period of romantic nationalism in Europe. A particular figure in this development was Johann Gottfried von Herder, whose writings in the 1770s presented oral traditions as organic processes grounded in the locale. After the German states were invaded by Napoleonic France, Herder's approach was adopted by many of his fellow Germans, who systematized the recorded folk traditions and used them in their process of nation building. This process was enthusiastically embraced by smaller nations, like Finland, Estonia, and Hungary, which were seeking political independence from their dominant neighbors.

Folklore, as a field of study, was further developed among 19th-century European scholars, who were contrasting tradition with the newly developing modernity. Its focus was the oral folklore of the rural peasant populations, which were considered as residues and survivals of the past that continued to exist within the lower strata of society. The "Kinder- und Hausmärchen" of the Brothers Grimm (first published 1812) is the best known but by no means only collection of verbal folklore of the European peasantry of that time. This interest in stories, sayings, and songs continued throughout the 19th century and aligned the fledgling discipline of folkloristics with literature and mythology. By the turn of the 20th century, the number and sophistication of folklore studies and folklorists had grown both in Europe and North America. Whereas European folklorists remained focused on the oral folklore of the homogenous peasant populations in their regions, the American folklorists, led by Franz Boas and Ruth Benedict, chose to consider Native American cultures in their research, and included the totality of their customs and beliefs as folklore. This distinction aligned American folkloristics with cultural anthropology and ethnology, using the same techniques of data collection in their field research. This divided alliance of folkloristics between the humanities in Europe and the social sciences in America offers a wealth of theoretical vantage points and research tools to the field of folkloristics as a whole, even as it continues to be a point of discussion within the field itself.

The term folkloristics, along with the alternative name folklore studies, (Note: The word folkloristics is favored by Alan Dundes, and used in the title of his publication Dundes 1978; the term folklore studies is defined and used by Simon Bronner, see Bronner 1986, p. xi.) became widely used in the 1950s to distinguish the academic study of traditional culture from the folklore artifacts themselves. When the American Folklife Preservation Act (Public Law 94-201) was passed by the U.S. Congress in January 1976, to coincide with the Bicentennial Celebration, folkloristics in the United States came of age.

"…[Folklife] means the traditional expressive culture shared within the various groups in the United States: familial, ethnic, occupational, religious, regional; expressive culture includes a wide range of creative and symbolic forms such as custom, belief, technical skill, language, literature, art, architecture, music, play, dance, drama, ritual, pageantry, handicraft; these expressions are mainly learned orally, by imitation, or in performance, and are generally maintained without benefit of formal instruction or institutional direction."

Added to the extensive array of other legislation designed to protect the natural and cultural heritage of the United States, this law also marks a shift in national awareness. It gives voice to a growing understanding that cultural diversity is a national strength and a resource worthy of protection. Paradoxically, it is a unifying feature, not something that separates the citizens of a country. "We no longer view cultural difference as a problem to be solved, but as a tremendous opportunity. In the diversity of American folklife, we find a marketplace teeming with the exchange of traditional forms and cultural ideas, a rich resource for Americans". This diversity is celebrated annually at the Smithsonian Folklife Festival and many other folklife fests around the country.

There are numerous other definitions. According to William Bascom, there are "four functions to folklore":

- Folklore lets people escape from repressions imposed upon them by society.
- Folklore validates culture, justifying its rituals and institutions to those who perform and observe them.
- Folklore is a pedagogic device which reinforces morals and values and builds wit.
- Folklore is a means of applying social pressure and exercising social control.

== Definition of "folk" ==
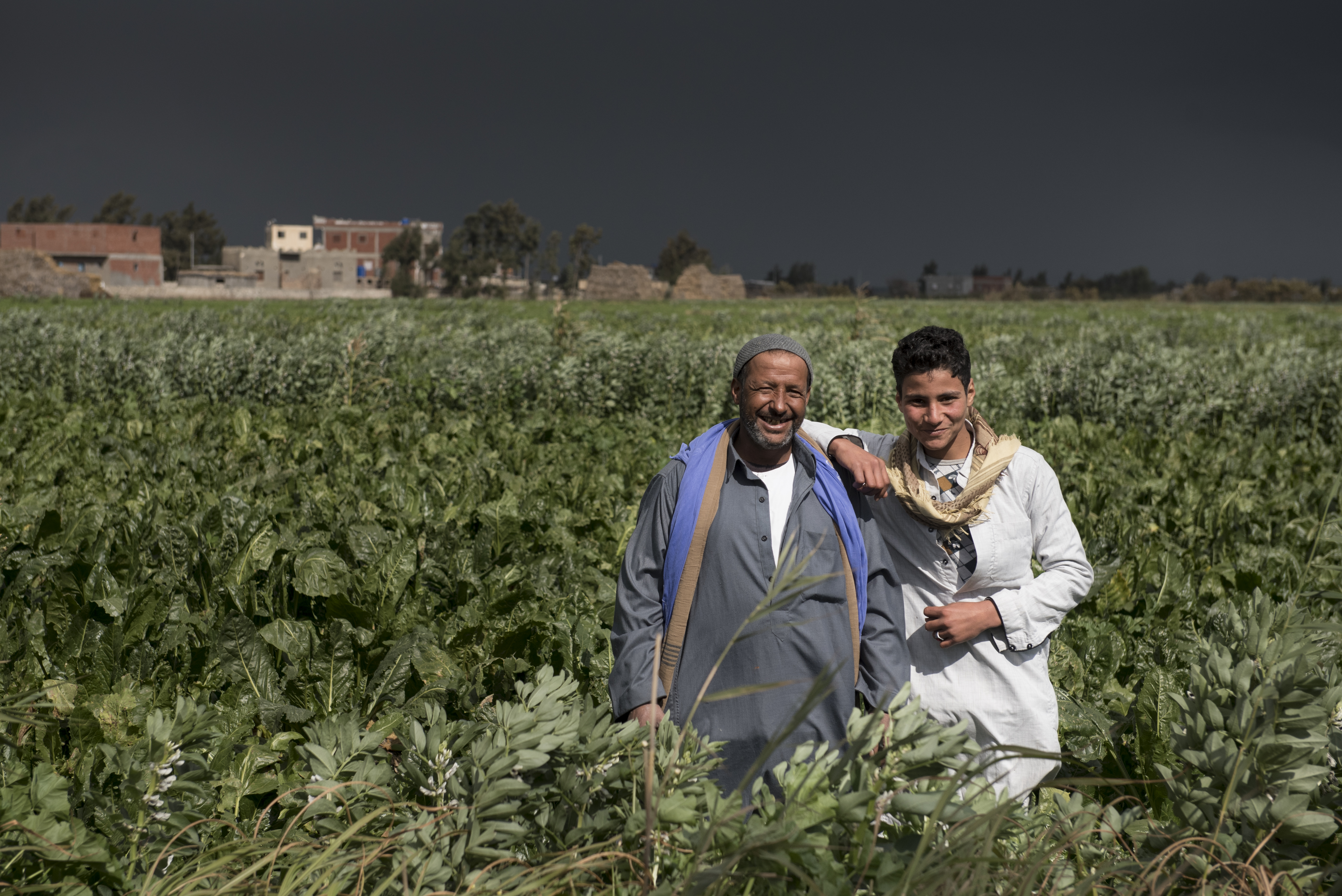
Friends in a farm

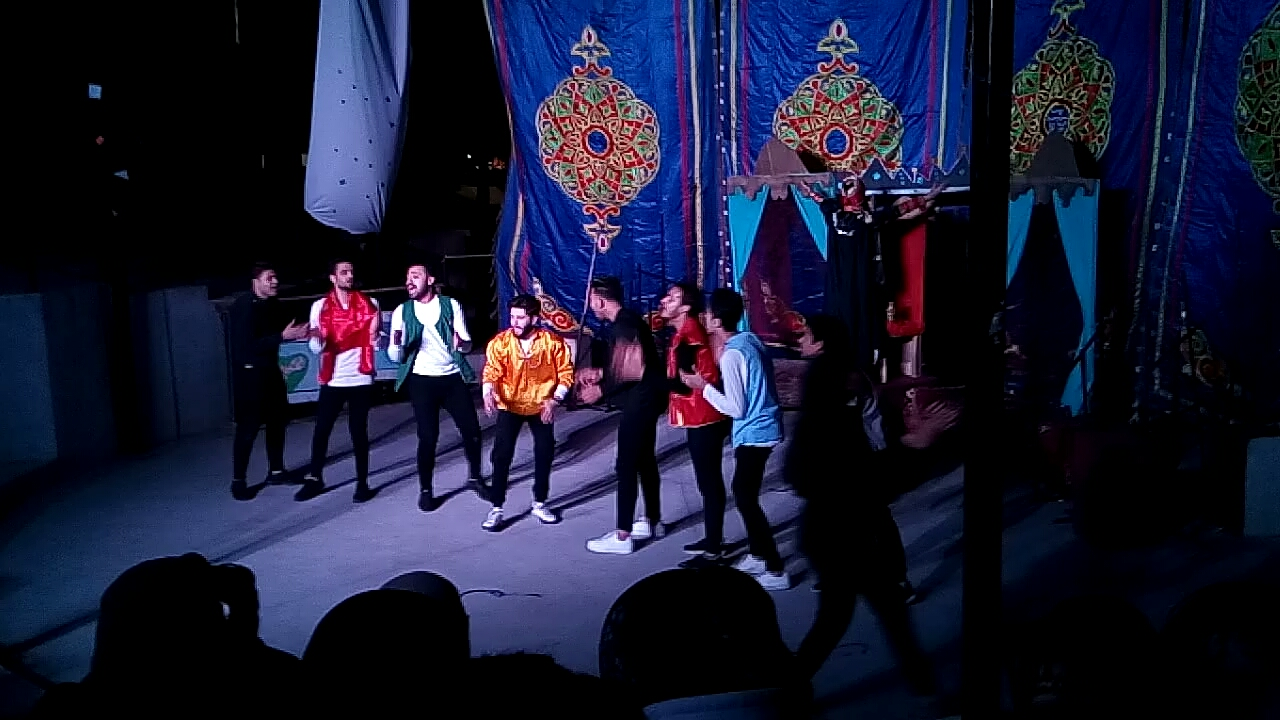
Folklore theater in Mansoura, Egypt

The folk of the 19th century, the social group identified in the original term "folklore", was characterized by being rural, illiterate, and poor. They were the peasants living in the countryside, in contrast to the urban populace of the cities. Only toward the end of the century did the urban proletariat (on the coattails of Marxist theory) become included with the rural poor as folk. The common feature in this expanded definition of folk was their identification as the underclass of society.

Moving forward into the 20th century, in tandem with new thinking in the social sciences, folklorists also revised and expanded their concept of the folk group. By the 1960s, it was understood that social groups, i.e., folk groups, were all around us; each individual is enmeshed in a multitude of differing identities and their concomitant social groups. The first group that each of us is born into is the family, and each family has its own unique family folklore. As a child grows into an individual, its identities also increase to include age, language, ethnicity, occupation, etc. Each of these cohorts has its own folklore, and as one folklorist points out, this is "not idle speculation… Decades of fieldwork have demonstrated conclusively that these groups do have their own folklore." In this modern understanding, folklore is a function of shared identity within any social group.

This folklore can include jokes, sayings, and expected behavior in multiple variants, always transmitted informally. For the most part, it will be learned by observation, imitation, repetition, or correction by other group members. This informal knowledge is used to confirm and reinforce the identity of the group. It can be used both internally within the group to express their common identity, for example in an initiation ceremony for new members. It can also be used externally to differentiate the group from outsiders, like a folk dance demonstration at a community festival. Significant to folklorists here is that there are two opposing but equally valid ways to use this in the study of a group: you can start with an identified group in order to explore its folklore, or you can identify folklore items and use them to identify the social group.

Beginning in the 1960s, a further expansion of the concept of folk began to unfold through the study of folklore. Individual researchers identified folk groups that had previously been overlooked and ignored. One notable example of this is found in an issue of the Journal of American Folklore, published in 1975, which is dedicated exclusively to articles on women's folklore, with approaches that had not come from a man's perspective. (Note: Contributors of this issue were, among others, Claire Farrer, Joan N. Radner, Susan Lanser, Elaine Lawless, and Jeannie B. Thomas.) Other groups that were highlighted as part of this broadened understanding of the folk group were non-traditional families, occupational groups, and families that pursued the production of folk items over multiple generations.

Folklorist Richard Dorson explained in 1976 that the study of folklore is "concerned with the study of traditional culture, or the unofficial culture" that is the folk culture, "as opposed to the elite culture, not for the sake of proving a thesis but to learn about the mass of [humanity] overlooked by the conventional disciplines."

== Folklore genres ==
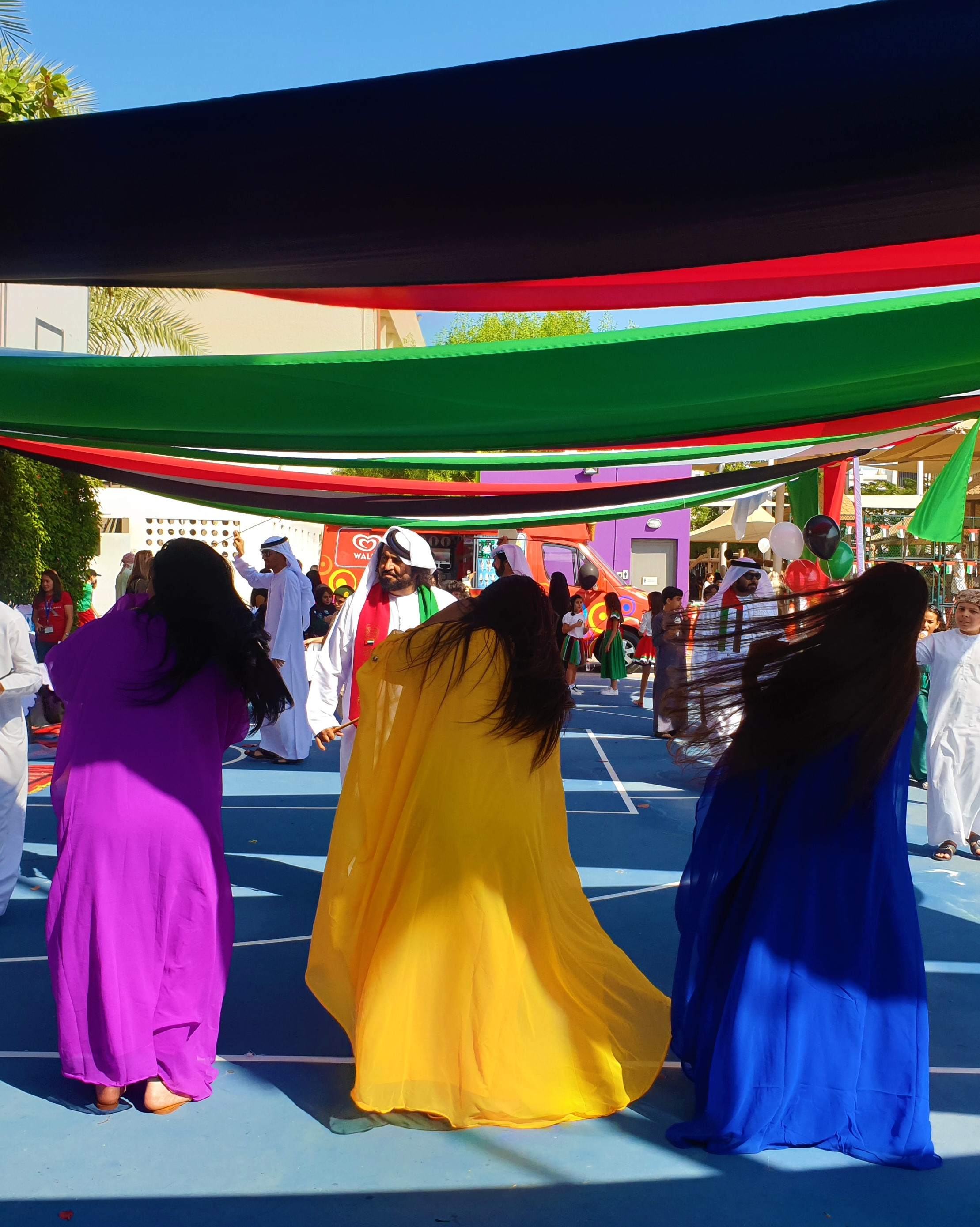
United Arab Emirates' traditional folk dance; the women flip their hair sideways in brightly coloured traditional dress.

Individual folklore artifacts are commonly classified as one of three types: material, verbal or customary lore. For the most part self-explanatory, these categories include physical objects (material folklore), common sayings, expressions, stories and songs (verbal folklore), and beliefs and ways of doing things (customary folklore). There is also a fourth major subgenre defined for children's folklore and games (childlore), as the collection and interpretation of this fertile topic is particular to school yards and neighborhood streets. Each of these genres and their subtypes is intended to organize and categorize the folklore artifacts; they provide common vocabulary and consistent labeling for folklorists to communicate with each other.

That said, each artifact is unique; in fact, one of the characteristics of all folklore artifacts is their variation within genres and types. This is in direct contrast to manufactured goods, where the goal in production is to create identical products, and any variations are considered mistakes. It is, however, just this required variation that makes the identification and classification of the defining features a challenge. While this classification is essential for the subject area of folkloristics, it remains just labeling and adds little to an understanding of the traditional development and meaning of the artifacts themselves.

Necessary as they are, genre classifications are misleading in their oversimplification of the subject area. Folklore artifacts are never self-contained, they do not stand in isolation but are particulars in the self-representation of a community. Different genres are frequently combined with each other to mark an event. So a birthday celebration might include a song or formulaic way of greeting the birthday child (verbal), presentation of a cake and wrapped presents (material), as well as customs to honor the individual, such as sitting at the head of the table and blowing out the candles with a wish. There might also be special games played at birthday parties, which are not generally played at other times. Adding to the complexity of the interpretation, the birthday party for a seven-year-old will not be identical to the birthday party for that same child as a six-year-old, even though they follow the same model. Each artifact embodies a single variant of a performance in a given time and space. The task of the folklorist becomes to identify within this surfeit of variables the constants and the expressed meaning that shimmer through all variations: honoring of the individual within the circle of family and friends, gifting to express their value and worth to the group, and of course, the festival food and drink as signifiers of the event.

=== Verbal tradition ===
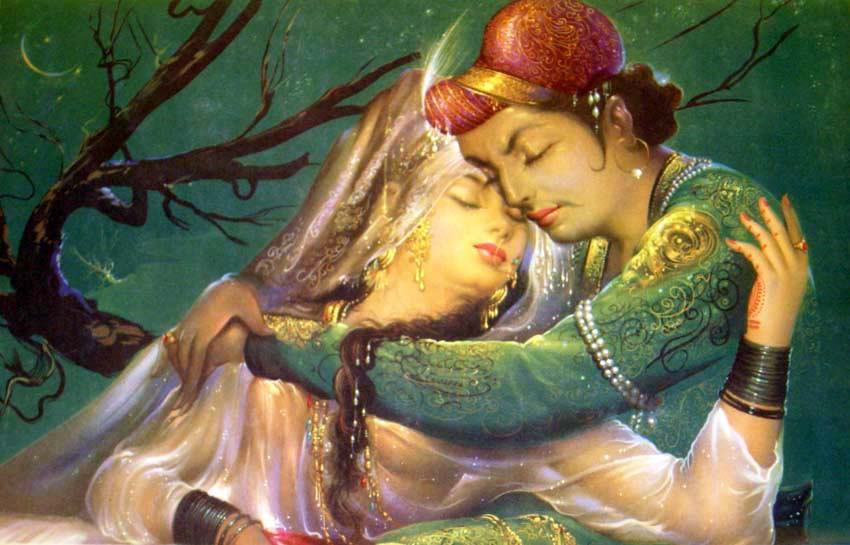
The story of Jahangir and Anarkali is popular folklore in the former territories of the Mughal Empire.

The formal definition of verbal lore is words, both written and oral, that are "spoken, sung, voiced forms of traditional utterance that show repetitive patterns." Crucial here are the repetitive patterns. Verbal lore is not just any conversation, but words and phrases conforming to a traditional configuration recognized by both the speaker and the audience. For narrative types, by definition, they have a consistent structure and follow an existing model in their narrative form. (Note: Vladimir Propp first defined a uniform structure in Russian fairy tales in his groundbreaking monograph Morphology of the Folktale, published in Russian in 1928. See Propp 1968) As just one simple example, in English, the phrase "An elephant walks into a bar…" instantaneously flags the following text as a joke. It might be one you have already heard, but it might be one that the speaker has just thought up within the current context. Another example is the child's song "Old MacDonald Had a Farm", where each performance is distinctive in the animals named, their order, and their sounds. Songs such as this are used to express cultural values (farms are important, farmers are old and weather-beaten) and teach children about different domesticated animals.

Verbal folklore was the original folklore, the artifacts defined by William Thoms as older, oral cultural traditions of the rural populace. In his 1846 published call for help in documenting antiquities, Thoms was echoing scholars from across the European continent to collect artifacts of verbal lore. By the beginning of the 20th century, these collections had grown to include artifacts from around the world and across several centuries. A system to organize and categorize them became necessary. Antti Aarne published the first classification system for folktales in 1910. This was later expanded into the Aarne–Thompson classification system by Stith Thompson and remains the standard classification system for European folktales and other types of oral literature. As the number of classified oral artifacts grew, similarities were noted in items that had been collected from very different geographic regions, ethnic groups, and epochs, giving rise to the Historic–Geographic Method, a methodology that dominated folkloristics in the first half of the 20th century.

When William Thoms first published his appeal to document the verbal lore of the rural populations, it was believed these folk artifacts would die out as the population became literate. Over the past two centuries, this belief has proven to be wrong; folklorists continue to collect verbal lore in both written and spoken form from all social groups. Some variants might have been captured in published collections, but much of it is still transmitted orally and, indeed, continues to be generated in new forms and variants at an alarming rate.

Below is a small sampling of types and examples of verbal lore.

- Aloha
- Ballads
- Blessings
- Bluegrass
- Chants
- Charms
- Cinderella
- Country music
- Cowboy poetry
- Creation stories
- Curses
- English similes
- Epic poetry
- Fable
- Fairy tale
- Folk belief
- Folk etymologies
- Folk metaphors
- Folk poetry
- Folk music
- Folksongs
- Folk speech
- Folktales of oral tradition
- Ghostlore
- Greetings
- Hog-calling
- Insults
- Jokes
- Keening
- Latrinalia
- Legends
- Limericks
- Lullabies
- Myth
- Oaths
- Leave-taking formulas
- Fakelore
- Place names
- Prayers at bedtime
- Proverbs
- Retorts
- Riddle
- Roasts
- Sagas
- Sea shanties
- Street vendors
- Superstition
- Tall tale
- Taunts
- Toasts
- Tongue-twisters
- Urban legends
- Word games
- Yodeling

=== Material culture ===
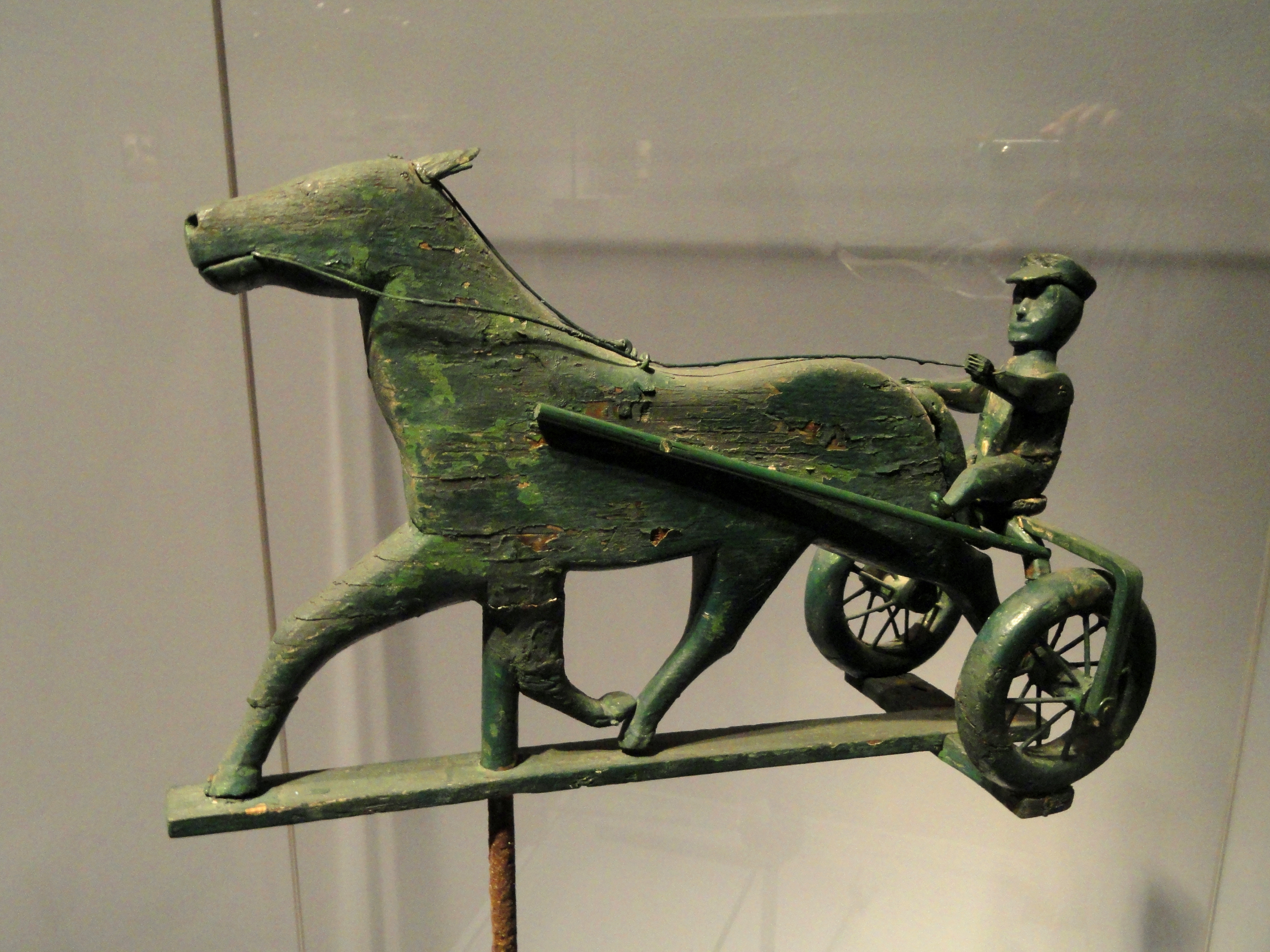
Horse and sulky weathervane, Smithsonian American Art Museum

The genre of material culture includes all artifacts that can be touched, held, lived in, or eaten. They are tangible objects with a physical or mental presence, either intended for permanent use or to be used at the next meal. Most of these folklore artifacts are single objects that have been created by hand for a specific purpose; however, folk artifacts can also be mass-produced, such as dreidels or Christmas decorations. These items continue to be considered folklore because of their long (pre-industrial) history and their customary use. All of these material objects "existed prior to and continue alongside mechanized industry. … [They are] transmitted across the generations and subject to the same forces of conservative tradition and individual variation" that are found in all folk artifacts. Folklorists are interested in the physical form, the method of manufacture or construction, the pattern of use, as well as the procurement of the raw materials. The meaning to those who both make and use these objects is important. Of primary significance in these studies is the complex balance of continuity over change in both their design and their decoration.

Traditional highlanders' pins hand-made by a goldsmith in Podhale, Poland

In Europe, prior to the Industrial Revolution, everything was made by hand. While some folklorists of the 19th century wanted to secure the oral traditions of the rural folk before the populace became literate, other folklorists sought to identify hand-crafted objects before their production processes were lost to industrial manufacturing. Just as verbal lore continues to be actively created and transmitted in today's culture, so these handicrafts can still be found all around us, with possibly a shift in purpose and meaning. There are many reasons for continuing to handmake objects for use, for example, these skills may be needed to repair manufactured items, or a unique design might be required that is not (or cannot be) found in the stores. Many crafts are considered simple home maintenance, such as cooking, sewing and carpentry. For many people, handicrafts have also become an enjoyable and satisfying hobby. Handmade objects are often regarded as prestigious, where extra time and thought is spent in their creation and their uniqueness is valued. For the folklorist, these hand-crafted objects embody multifaceted relationships in the lives of the craftspeople and the users, a concept that has been lost with mass-produced items that have no connection to an individual craftsperson.

Many traditional crafts, such as ironworking and glass-making, have been elevated to the fine or applied arts and taught in art schools; or they have been repurposed as folk art, characterized as objects whose decorative form supersedes their utilitarian needs. Folk art is found in hex signs on Pennsylvania Dutch barns, tin man sculptures made by metalworkers, front yard Christmas displays, decorated school lockers, carved gun stocks, and tattoos. "Words such as naive, self-taught, and individualistic are used to describe these objects, and the exceptional rather than the representative creation is featured." This is in contrast to the understanding of folklore artifacts that are nurtured and passed along within a community. (Note: Henry Glassie, a distinguished folklorist studying technology in cultural context, notes that in Turkish, one word, sanat, refers to all objects, not distinguishing between art and craft. The latter distinction, Glassie emphasizes, is not based on medium but on social class. This raises the question as to the difference between arts and crafts; is the difference found merely in the labeling?)

Many objects of material folklore are challenging to classify, difficult to archive, and unwieldy to store. The assigned task of museums is to preserve and make use of these bulky artifacts of material culture. To this end, the concept of the living museum has developed, beginning in Scandinavia at the end of the 19th century. These open-air museums not only display the artifacts, but also teach visitors how the items were used, with actors reenacting the everyday lives of people from all segments of society, relying heavily on the material artifacts of a pre-industrial society. Many locations even duplicate the processing of the objects, thus creating new objects of an earlier historic time period. Living museums are now found throughout the world as part of a thriving heritage industry.

This list represents just a small sampling of objects and skills that are included in studies of material culture.

- Autograph books
- Bunad
- Embroidery
- Folk art
- Folk costume
- Folk medicines
- Food recipes and presentation
- Foodways
- Common handicrafts
- Handmade toys
- Haystacks
- Hex signs
- Decorative ironworks
- Pottery
- Quilting
- Stone sculpting
- Tipis
- Traditional fences
- Vernacular architecture
- Weather vanes
- Woodworking

=== Customs ===
Customary culture is remembered enactment, i.e. re-enactment. It is the patterns of expected behavior within a group, the "traditional and expected way of doing things" A custom can be a single gesture, such as thumbs down or a handshake. It can also be a complex interaction of multiple folk customs and artifacts as seen in a child's birthday party, including verbal lore ("Happy Birthday to You" song), material lore (presents and a birthday cake), special games (Musical chairs) and individual customs (making a wish as you blow out the candles). Each of these is a folklore artifact in its own right, potentially worthy of investigation and cultural analysis. Together, they combine to build the custom of a birthday party celebration, a scripted combination of multiple artifacts that have meaning within their social group.

Santa Claus giving gifts to children, a common folk practice associated with Christmas in Western nations

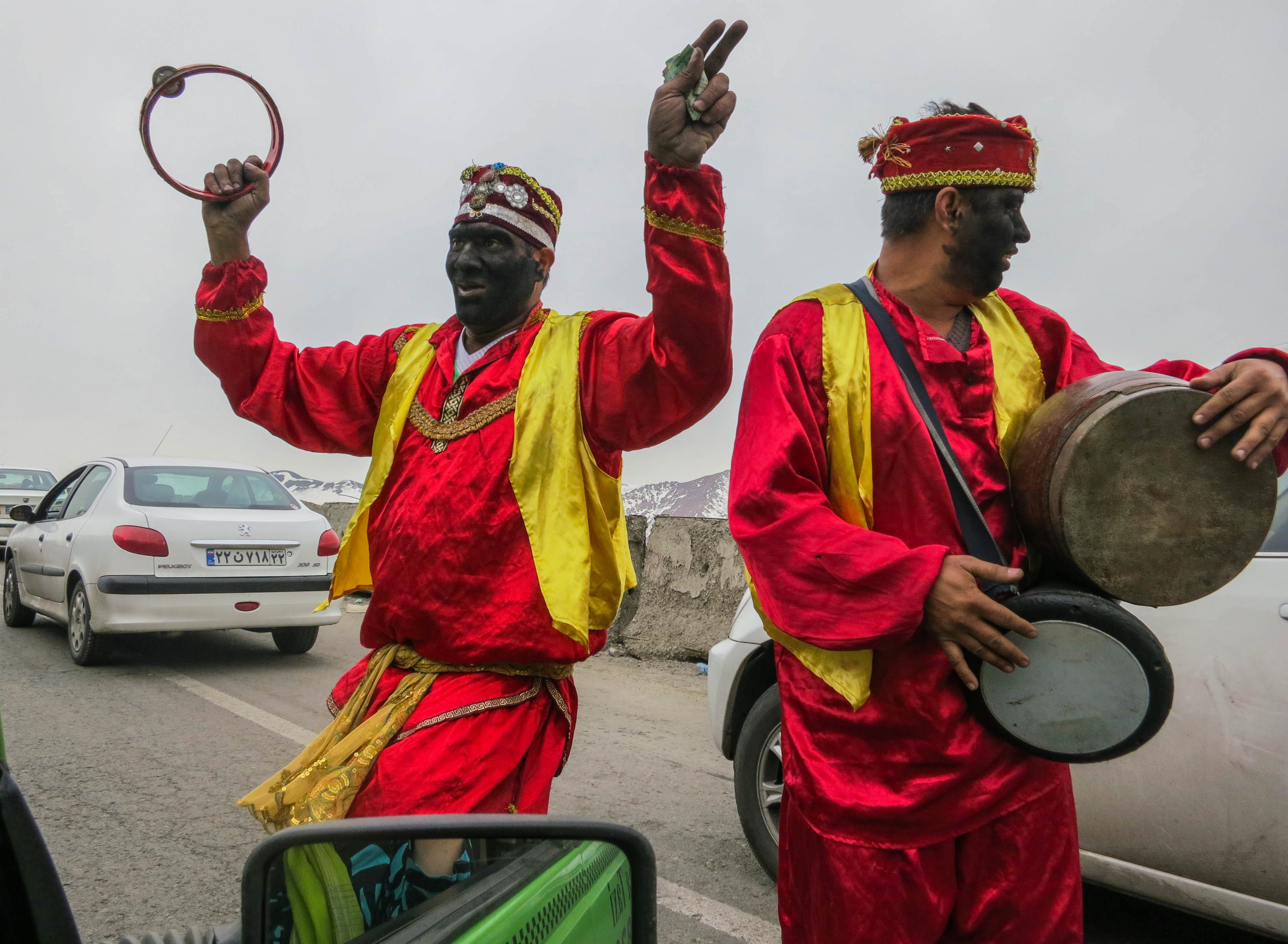
Hajji Firuz is a fictional character in Iranian folklore who appears in the streets by the beginning of Nowruz, dances through the streets while singing and playing tambourine.

Folklorists divide customs into several different categories. A custom can be a seasonal celebration, such as Thanksgiving or New Year's. It can be a life cycle celebration for an individual, such as baptism, birthday or wedding. A custom can also mark a community festival or event; examples of this are Carnival in Cologne or Mardi Gras in New Orleans. This category also includes the Smithsonian Folklife Festival celebrated each summer on the Mall in Washington, DC. A fourth category includes customs related to folk beliefs. Walking under a ladder is just one of many symbols considered unlucky. Occupational groups tend to have a rich history of customs related to their life and work, so the traditions of sailors or lumberjacks. (Note: The folklorist Archie Green specialized in workers' traditions and the lore of labor groups.) The area of ecclesiastical folklore, which includes modes of worship not sanctioned by the established church tends to be so large and complex that it is usually treated as a specialized area of folk customs; it requires considerable expertise in standard church ritual in order to adequately interpret folk customs and beliefs that originated in official church practice.

Customary folklore is always a performance, be it a single gesture or a complex of scripted customs, and participating in the custom, either as performer or audience, signifies acknowledgment of that social group. Some customary behavior is intended to be performed and understood only within the group itself, so the handkerchief code is sometimes used in the gay community or the initiation rituals of the Freemasons. Other customs are designed specifically to represent a social group to outsiders, those who do not belong to this group. The St. Patrick's Day Parade in New York and in other communities across the continent is a single example of an ethnic group parading their separateness (differential behavior), and encouraging Americans of all stripes to show alliance to this colorful ethnic group.

Practitioners of hoodening, a folk custom found in Kent, southeastern England, in 1909

These festivals and parades, with a target audience of people who do not belong to the social group, intersect with the interests and mission of public folklorists, who are engaged in the documentation, preservation, and presentation of traditional forms of folklife. With a swell in popular interest in folk traditions, these community celebrations are becoming more numerous throughout the Western world. While ostensibly parading the diversity of their community, economic groups have discovered that these folk parades and festivals are good for business. All shades of people are out on the streets, eating, drinking and spending. This attracts support not only from the business community, but also from federal and state organizations for these local street parties. Paradoxically, in parading diversity within the community, these events have come to authenticate true community, where business interests ally with the varied (folk) social groups to promote the interests of the community as a whole.

This is just a small sampling of types and examples of customary lore.

- Amish
- Barn raising
- Birthday
- Cakewalk
- Cat's cradle
- Chaharshanbe Suri
- Christmas
- Crossed fingers
- Folk dance
- Folk drama
- Folk medicine
- Giving the finger
- Halloween
- Hoodening
- Gestures
- Groundhog Day
- Louisiana Creole people
- Mime
- Native Hawaiians
- Ouija board
- Powwows
- Practical jokes
- Saint John's Eve
- Shakers
- Symbols
- Thanksgiving
- Thumbs down
- Trick or Treating
- Yo-yos

=== Childlore and games ===
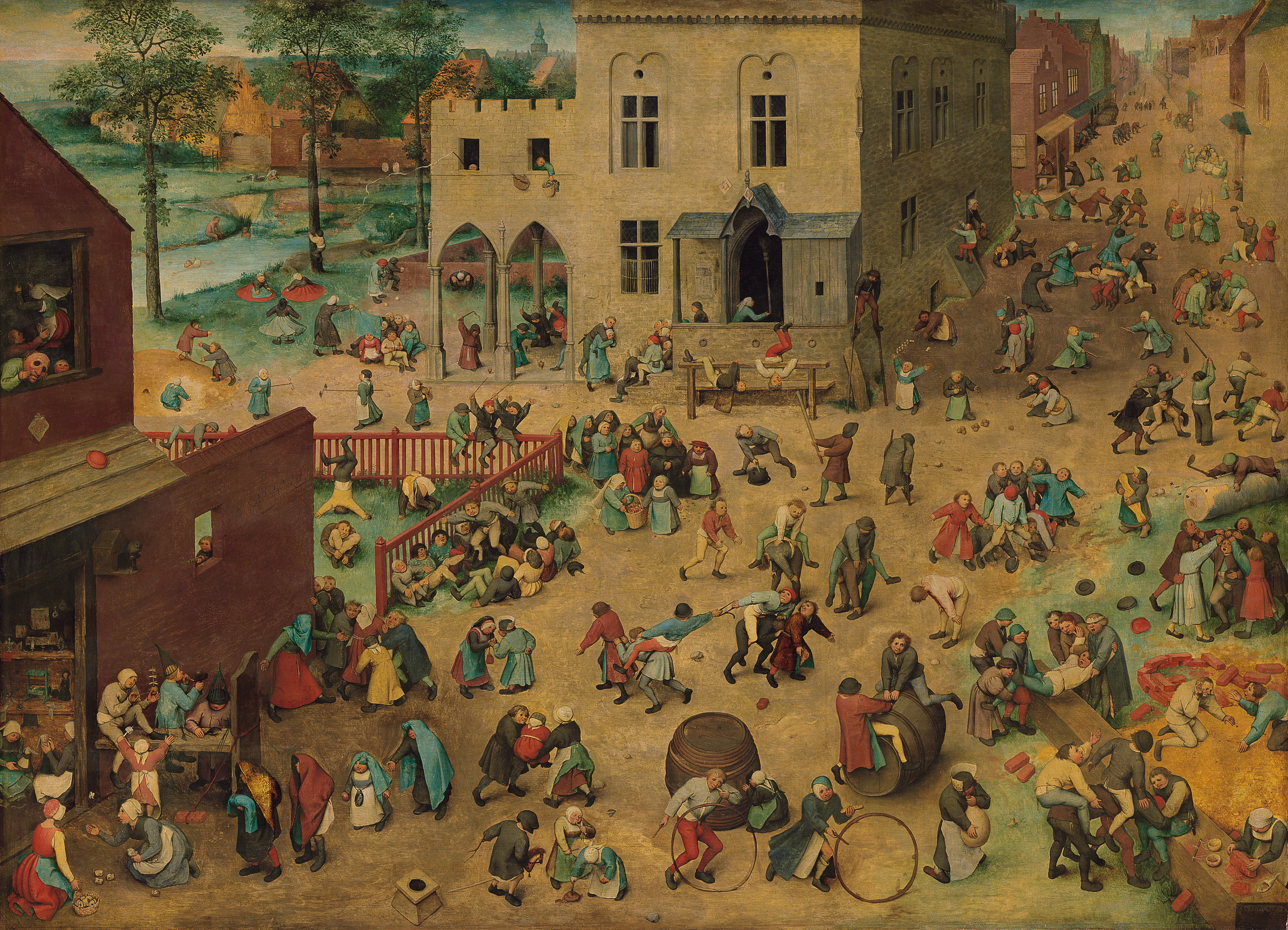
Children's Games by Pieter Bruegel the Elder, 1560; there are five boys playing a game of buck buck in the lower right-hand corner of the painting.

Childlore is a distinct branch of folklore that deals with activities passed on by children to other children, away from the influence or supervision of an adult. Children's folklore contains artifacts from all the standard folklore genres of verbal, material, and customary lore; it is however the child-to-child conduit that distinguishes these artifacts. For childhood is a social group where children teach, learn and share their own traditions, flourishing in a street culture outside the purview of adults. This is also ideal where it needs to be collected, as Iona and Peter Opie demonstrated in their pioneering book Children's Games in Street and Playground. Here the social group of children is studied on its own terms, not as a derivative of adult social groups. It is shown that the culture of children is quite distinctive; it is generally unnoticed by the sophisticated world of adults, and quite as little affected by it.

Of particular interest to folklorists here is the mode of transmission of these artifacts; this lore circulates exclusively within an informal pre-literate children's network or folk group. It does not include artifacts taught to children by adults. However, children can take the taught and teach it further to other children, turning it into childlore. Or they can take the artifacts and turn them into something else; so Old McDonald's farm is transformed from animal noises to the scatological version of animal poop. This childlore is characterized by "its lack of dependence on literary and fixed form. Children…operate among themselves in a world of informal and oral communication, unimpeded by the necessity of maintaining and transmitting information by written means". This is as close as folklorists can come to observing the transmission and social function of this folk knowledge before the spread of literacy during the 19th century.

As we have seen with the other genres, the original collections of children's lore and games in the 19th century was driven by a fear that the culture of childhood would die out. Early folklorists, among them Alice Gomme in Britain and William Wells Newell in the United States, felt a need to capture the unstructured and unsupervised street life and activities of children before it was lost. This fear proved to be unfounded. In a comparison of any modern school playground during recess and the painting of "Children's Games" by Pieter Breugel the Elder we can see that the activity level is similar, and many of the games from the 1560 painting are recognizable and comparable to modern variations still played today.

These same artifacts of childlore, in innumerable variations, also continue to serve the same function of learning and practicing skills needed for growth. So bouncing and swinging rhythms and rhymes encourage development of balance and coordination in infants and children. Verbal rhymes like Peter Piper picked... serve to increase both the oral and aural acuity of children. Songs and chants, accessing a different part of the brain, are used to memorize series (Alphabet song). They also provide the necessary beat to complex physical rhythms and movements, be it hand-clapping, jump roping, or ball bouncing. Furthermore, many physical games are used to develop strength, coordination and endurance of the players. For some team games, negotiations about the rules can run on longer than the game itself as social skills are rehearsed. Even as we are just now uncovering the neuroscience that undergirds the developmental function of this childlore, the artifacts themselves have been in play for centuries.

Below is listed just a small sampling of types and examples of childlore and games.

- Buck buck
- Counting rhymes
- Dandling rhymes
- Finger and toe rhymes
- Counting-out games
- Dreidel
- Eeny, meeny, miny, moe
- Games
- Traditional games
- London Bridge Is Falling Down
- Lullabies
- Nursery rhymes
- Playground songs
- Ball-bouncing rhymes
- Rhymes
- Riddles
- Ring a Ring o Roses
- Jump-rope rhymes
- Stickball
- Street games

=== Folk history ===
A case has been made for considering folk history as a distinct sub-category of folklore, an idea that has received attention from such folklorists as Richard Dorson. This field of study is represented in The Folklore Historian, an annual journal sponsored by the History and Folklore Section of the American Folklore Society and concerned with the connections of folklore with history, as well as the history of folklore studies.

- List of world folk-epics

== Folklore performance in context ==
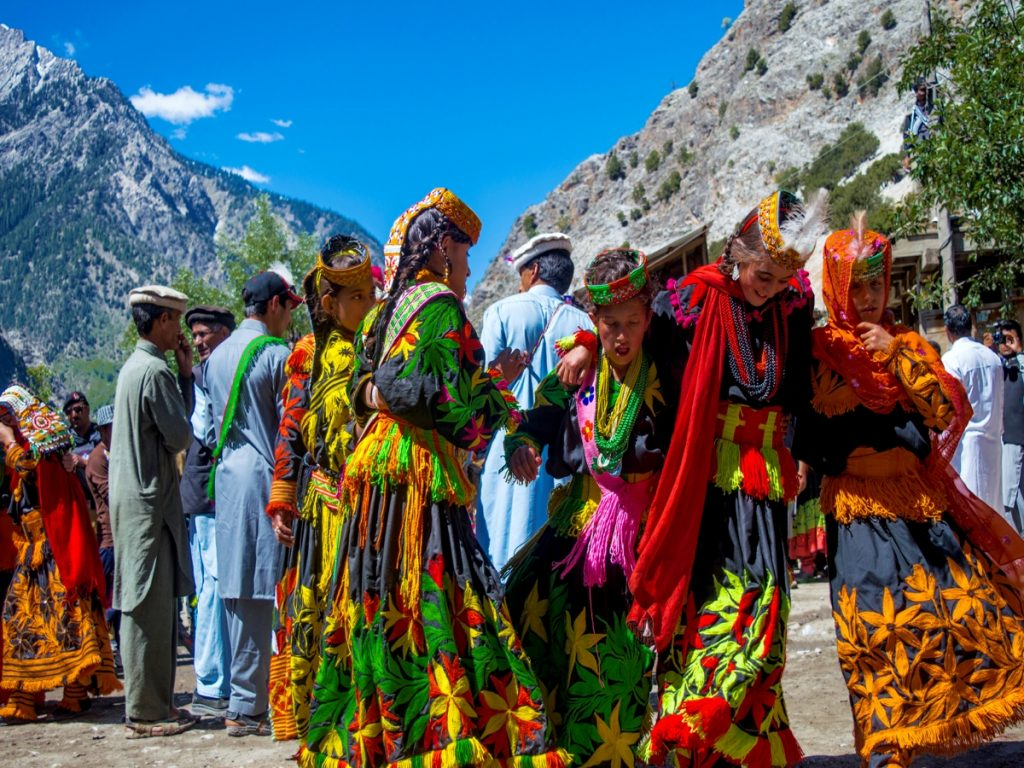
Folk-dance-kalash in Pakistan

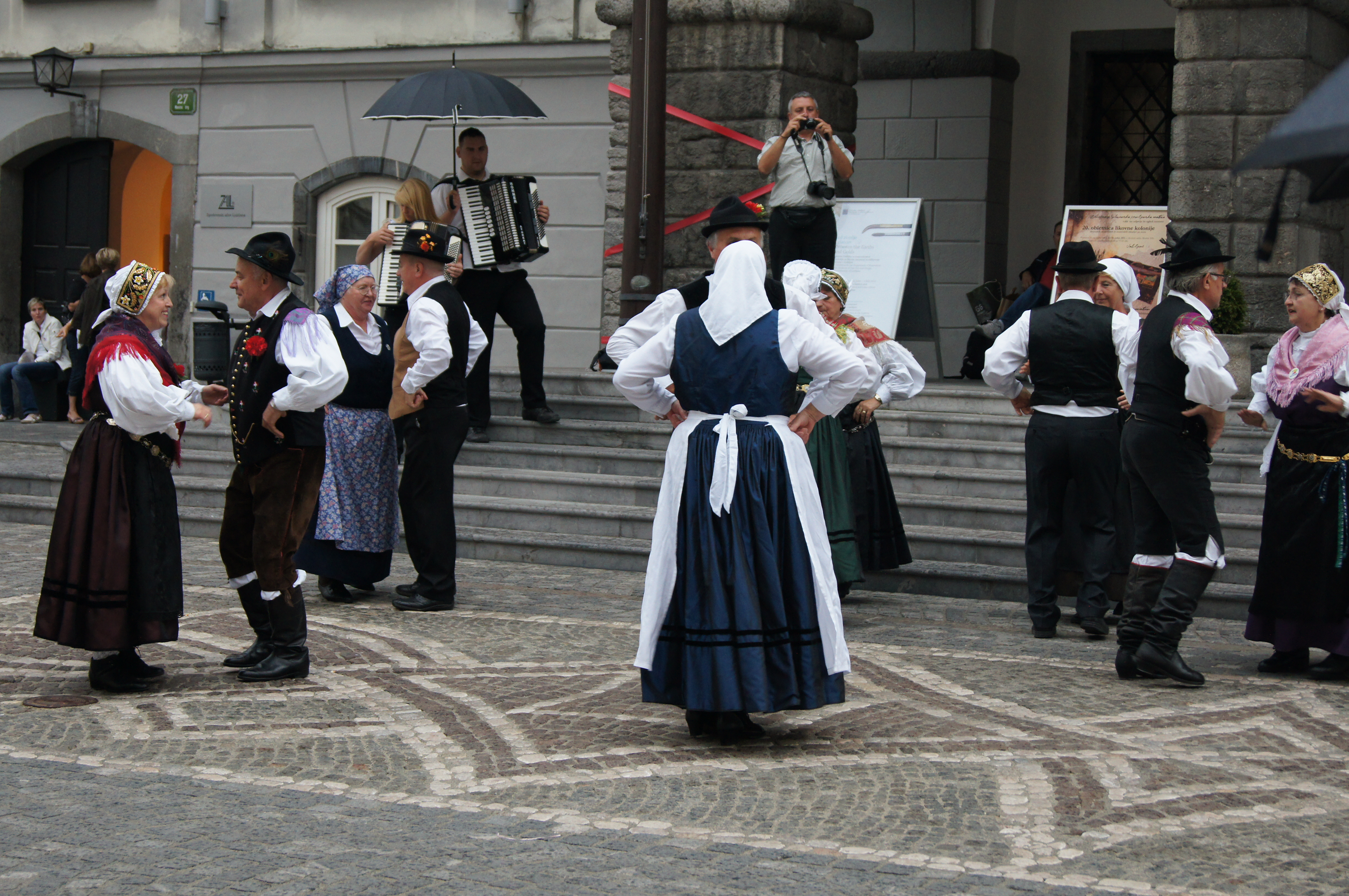
Slovene folklore dancers

Lacking context, folklore artifacts would be uninspiring objects without any life of their own. It is only through performance that the artifacts come alive as an active and meaningful component of a social group; the intergroup communication arises in the performance and this is where transmission of these cultural elements takes place. American folklorist Roger D. Abrahams has described it thus: "Folklore is folklore only when performed. As organized entities of performance, items of folklore have a sense of control inherent in them, a power that can be capitalized upon and enhanced through effective performance." Without transmission, these items are not folklore; they are just individual quirky tales and objects.

This understanding in folkloristics only occurred in the second half of the 20th century, when the two terms "folklore performance" and "text and context" dominated discussions among folklorists. These terms are not contradictory or even mutually exclusive. As borrowings from other fields of study, one or the other linguistic formulation is more appropriate to any given discussion. Performance is frequently tied to verbal and customary lore, whereas context is used in discussions of material lore. Both formulations offer different perspectives on the same folkloric understanding, specifically that folklore artifacts need to remain embedded in their cultural environment if we are to gain insight into their meaning for the community.

The concept of cultural (folklore) performance is shared with ethnography and anthropology among other social sciences. The cultural anthropologist Victor Turner identified four universal characteristics of cultural performance: playfulness, framing, the use of symbolic language, and employing the subjunctive mood. In viewing the performance, the audience leaves the daily reality to move into a mode of make-believe, or "what if?" It is self-evident that this fits well with all types of verbal lore, where reality has no place among the symbols, fantasies, and nonsense of traditional tales, proverbs, and jokes. Customs and the lore of children and games also fit easily into the language of a folklore performance.

Material culture requires some moulding to turn it into a performance. Should we consider the performance of the creation of the artifact, as in a quilting party, or the performance of the recipients who use the quilt to cover their marriage bed? Here the language of context works better to describe the quilting of patterns copied from the grandmother, quilting as a social event during the winter months, or the gifting of a quilt to signify the importance of the event. Each of these—the traditional pattern chosen, the social event, and the gifting—occur within the broader context of the community. Even so, when considering context, the structure and characteristics of performance can be recognized, including an audience, a framing event, and the use of decorative figures and symbols, all of which go beyond the utility of the object.

=== Backstory ===
Before the Second World War, folk artifacts had been understood and collected as cultural shards of an earlier time. They were considered individual vestigial artifacts, with little or no function in the contemporary culture. Given this understanding, the goal of the folklorist was to capture and document them before they disappeared. They were collected with no supporting data, bound in books, archived and classified more or less successfully. The Historic–Geographic Method worked to isolate and track these collected artifacts, mostly verbal lore, across space and time.

Following the Second World War, folklorists began to articulate a more holistic approach toward their subject matter. In tandem with the growing sophistication in the social sciences, attention was no longer limited to the isolated artifact, but extended to include the artifact embedded in an active cultural environment. One early proponent was Alan Dundes with his essay "Texture, Text and Context", first published 1964. A public presentation in 1967 by Dan Ben-Amos at the American Folklore Society brought the behavioral approach into open debate among folklorists. In 1972 Richard Dorson called out the "young Turks" for their movement toward a behavioral approach to folklore. This approach "shifted the conceptualization of folklore as an extractable item or 'text' to an emphasis on folklore as a kind of human behavior and communication. Conceptualizing folklore as behavior redefined the job of folklorists..." (Note: A more extensive discussion of this can be found in "The 'Text/Context' Controversy and the Emergence of Behavioral Approaches in Folklore", Gabbert 1999)

Folklore became a verb, an action, something that people do, not just something that they have. It is in the performance and the active context that folklore artifacts get transmitted in informal, direct communication, either verbally or in demonstration. Performance includes all the different modes and manners in which this transmission occurs.

=== Tradition-bearer and audience ===
Presentation of traditional Wallachian pipes at the Wallachian Open Air Museum, Rožnov pod Radhoštěm, Czech Republic, 2017

Transmission is a communicative process requiring a binary: one individual or group who actively transmits information in some form to another individual or group. Each of these is a defined role in the folklore process. The tradition-bearer is the individual who actively passes along the knowledge of an artifact; this can be either a mother singing a lullaby to her baby, or an Irish dance troupe performing at a local festival. They are named individuals, usually well known in the community as knowledgeable in their traditional lore. They are not the anonymous "folk", the nameless mass without of history or individuality.

The audience serves as the recipient by listening, watching, and retaining the performance. While few of the listeners become active tradition-bearers, many act as passive tradition bearers who preserve the memory of the artifact's presentation and content.

There is active communication between the audience and the performer. The performer is presenting to the audience; the audience in turn, through its actions and reactions, is actively communicating with the performer. The purpose of this performance is not to create something new but to re-create something that already exists; the performance is words and actions which are known, recognized and valued by both the performer and the audience. For folklore is first and foremost remembered behavior. As members of the same cultural reference group, they identify and value this performance as a piece of shared cultural knowledge.

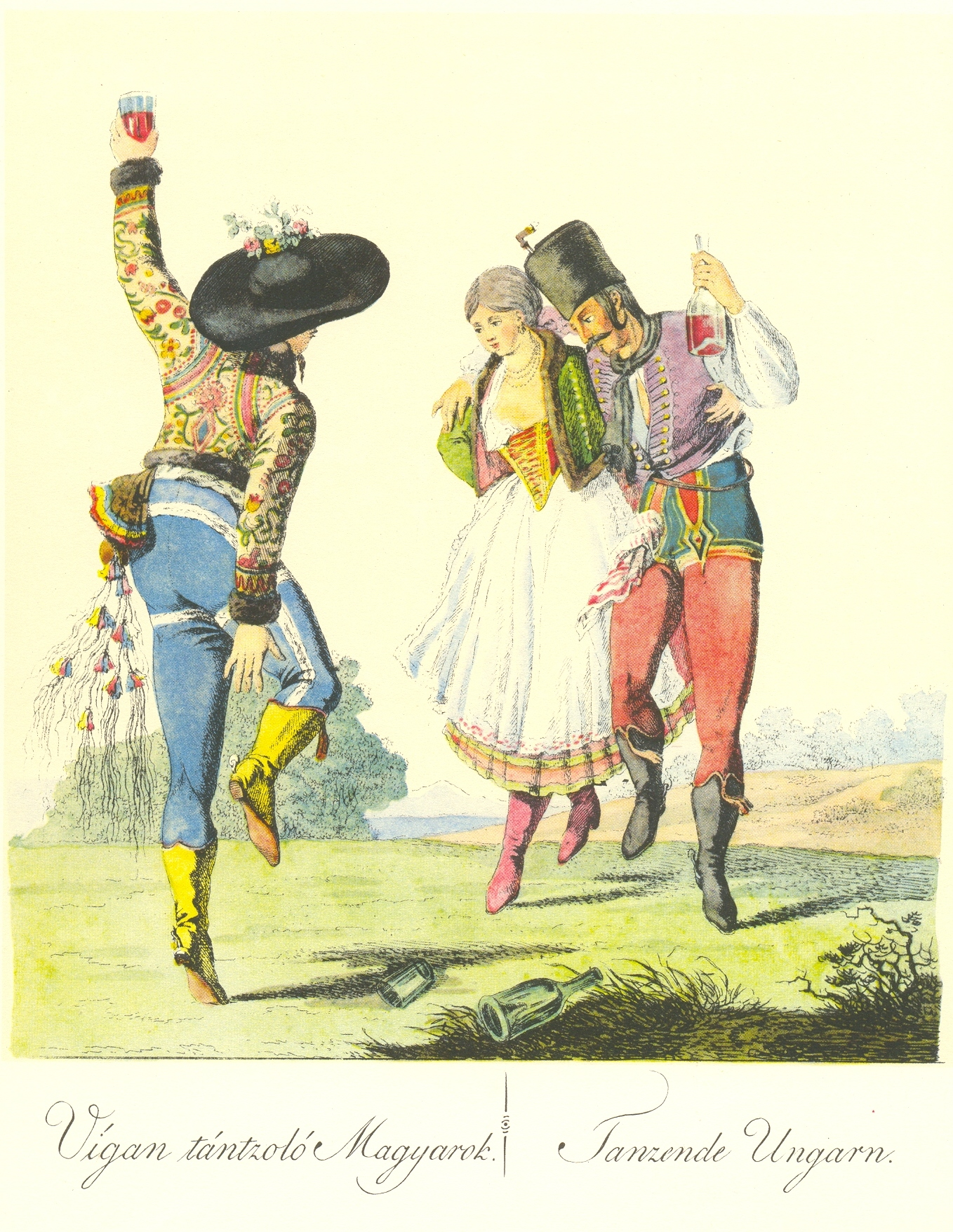
Dancing Hungarians by J. B. Heinbucher, 1816

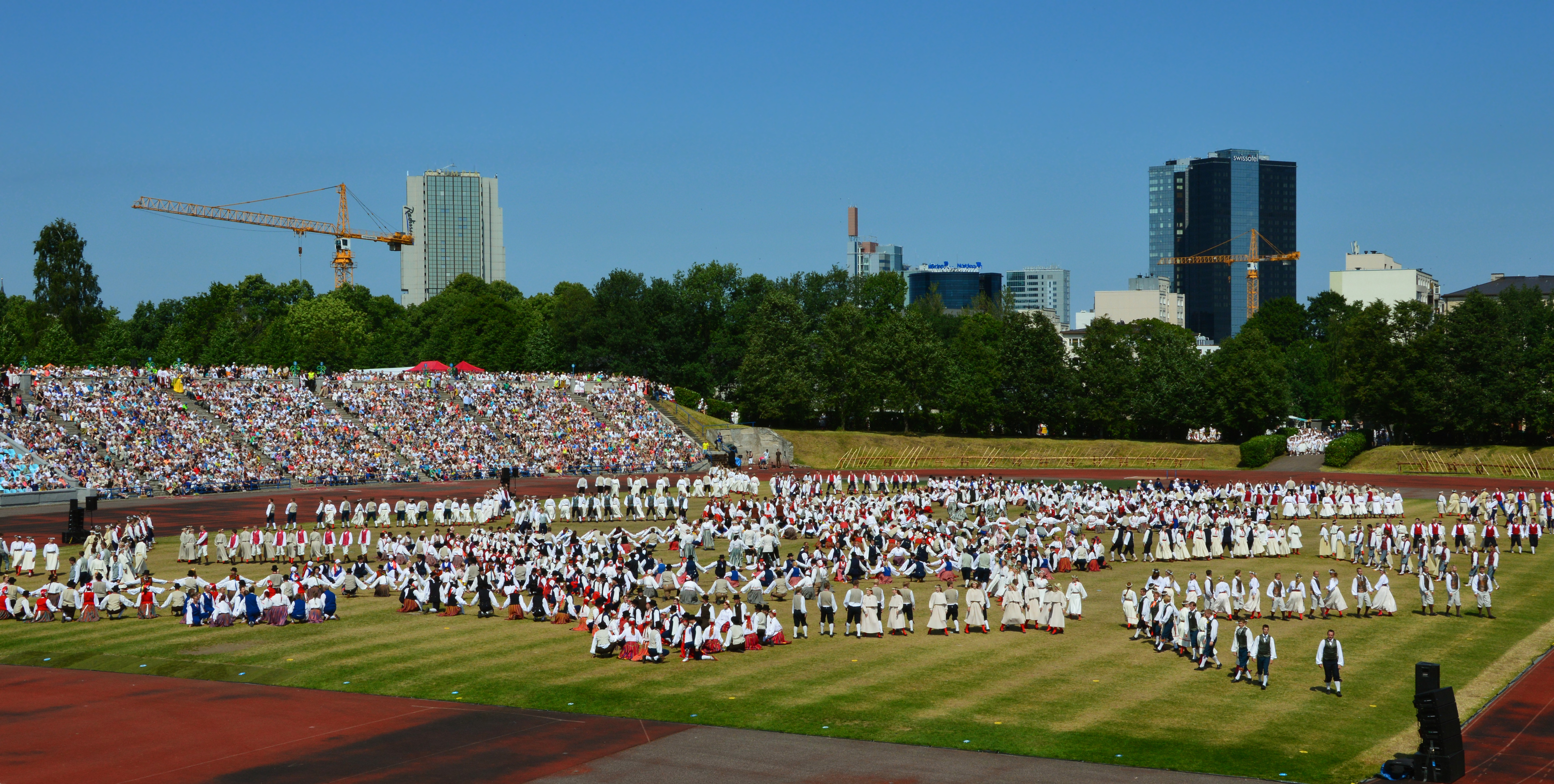
Some elements of folk culture might be in the center of local culture and an import part of self-identity. For instance folk dance is highly popular in Estonia and it has evolved into a sort of a national sport. (Note: See "Folk dance". Estonica. Archived from the original on 2016-03-03.) XIX Estonian Dance Celebration in 2015 that was held together with Estonian Song Festival.

=== Framing the performance ===
To initiate the performance, there must be a frame of some sort to indicate that what is to follow is indeed performance. The frame brackets it as outside of normal discourse. In customary lore such as life cycle celebrations (ex. birthday) or dance performances, the framing occurs as part of the event, frequently marked by location. The audience goes to the event location to participate. Games are defined primarily by rules, it is with the initiation of the rules that the game is framed. The folklorist Barre Toelken describes an evening spent in a Navaho family playing string figure games, with each of the members shifting from performer to audience as they create and display different figures to each other.

In verbal lore, the performer will start and end with recognized linguistic formulas. An easy example is seen in the common introduction to a joke: "Have you heard the one...", "Joke of the day...", or "An elephant walks into a bar". Each of these signals to the listeners that the following is a joke, not to be taken literally. The joke is completed with the punch line of the joke. Another traditional narrative marker in English is the framing of a fairy tale between the phrases "Once upon a time" and "They all lived happily ever after." Many languages have similar phrases which are used to frame a traditional tale. Each of these linguistic formulas removes the bracketed text from ordinary discourse, and marks it as a recognized form of stylized, formulaic communication for both the performer and the audience.

=== In the subjunctive voice ===
Framing as a narrative device serves to signal to both the story teller and the audience that the narrative which follows is indeed a fiction (verbal lore), and not to be understood as historical fact or reality. It moves the framed narration into the subjunctive mood, and marks a space in which "fiction, history, story, tradition, art, teaching, all exist within the narrated or performed expressive 'event' outside the normal realms and constraints of reality or time." This shift from the realis to the irrealis mood is understood by all participants within the reference group. It enables these fictional events to contain meaning for the group, and can lead to very real consequences.

=== Anderson's law of auto-correction ===
The theory of self-correction in folklore transmission was first articulated by the folklorist Walter Anderson in the 1920s; this posits a feedback mechanism which would keep folklore variants closer to the original form. (Note: Anderson is best known for his monograph Kaiser und Abt (Folklore Fellows' Communications 42, Helsinki 1923) on folktales of type AT 922.) This theory addresses the question about how, with multiple performers and multiple audiences, the artifact maintains its identity across time and geography. Anderson credited the audience with censoring narrators who deviated too far from the known (traditional) text.

Any performance is a two-way communication process. The performer addresses the audience with words and actions; the audience in turn actively responds to the performer. If this performance deviates too far from audience expectations of the familiar folk artifact, they will respond with negative feedback. Wanting to avoid more negative reaction, the performer will adjust his performance to conform to audience expectations. "Social reward by an audience [is] a major factor in motivating narrators..." It is this dynamic feedback loop between performer and audience which gives stability to the text of the performance.

In reality, this model is not so simplistic; there are multiple redundancies in the active folklore process. The performer has heard the tale multiple times, he has heard it from different story tellers in multiple versions. In turn, he tells the tale multiple times to the same or a different audience, and they expect to hear the version they know. This expanded model of redundancy in a non-linear narrative process makes it difficult to innovate during any single performance; corrective feedback from the audience will be immediate. "At the heart of both autopoetic self-maintenance and the 'virality' of meme transmission... it is enough to assume that some sort of recursive action maintains a degree of integrity [of the artifact] in certain features ... sufficient to allow us to recognize it as an instance of its type."

=== Context of material lore ===
For material folk artifacts, it becomes more fruitful to return to the terminology of Alan Dundes: text and context. Here the text designates the physical artifact itself, the single item made by an individual for a specific purpose. The context is then unmasked by observation and questions concerning both its production and its usage. Why was it made, how was it made, who will use it, how will they use it, where did the raw materials come from, who designed it, etc. These questions are limited only by the skill of the interviewer.

In his study of southeastern Kentucky chair makers, Michael Owen Jones describes production of a chair within the context of the life of the craftsman. For Henry Glassie in his study of Folk Housing in Middle Virginia, the investigation concerns the historical pattern he finds repeated in the dwellings of this region: the house is planted in the landscape just as the landscape completes itself with the house. The artisan in his roadside stand or shop in the nearby town wants to make and display products which appeal to customers. There is "a craftsperson's eagerness to produce 'satisfactory items' due to a close personal contact with the customer and expectations to serve the customer again." Here the role of consumer "... is the basic force responsible for the continuity and discontinuity of behavior."

In material culture the context becomes the cultural environment in which the object is made (chair), used (house), and sold (wares). None of these artisans is "anonymous" folk; they are individuals making a living with the tools and skills learned within and valued in the context of their community.

=== Toelken's conservative-dynamic continuum ===
No two performances are identical. The performer attempts to keep the performance within expectations, but this happens despite a multitude of changing variables. They have given this performance one time more or less, the audience is different, the social and political environment has changed. In the context of material culture, no two hand-crafted items are identical. Sometimes these deviations in the performance and the production are unintentional, just part of the process. But sometimes these deviations are intentional; the performer or artisan wants to play with the boundaries of expectation and add their own creative touch. They perform within the tension of conserving the recognized form and adding innovation.

The folklorist Barre Toelken identifies this tension as "a combination of both changing ('dynamic') and static ('conservative') elements that evolve and change through sharing, communication and performance." Over time, the cultural context shifts and morphs: new leaders, new technologies, new values, new awareness. As the context changes, so must the artifact, for without modifications to map existing artifacts into the evolving cultural landscape, they lose their meaning. Joking as an active form of verbal lore makes this tension visible as joke cycles come and go to reflect new issues of concern. Once an artifact is no longer applicable to the context, transmission becomes a nonstarter; it loses relevancy for a contemporary audience. If it is not transmitted, then it is no longer folklore and becomes instead an historic relic.

=== In the electronic age ===
Folklorists have begun to identify how the advent of electronic communications will modify and change the performance and transmission of folklore artifacts. It is clear that the internet is modifying folkloric process, not killing it, as despite the historic association between folklore and anti-modernity, people continue to use traditional expressive forms in new media, including the internet. Jokes and joking are as plentiful as ever both in traditional face-to-face interactions and through electronic transmission. New communication modes are also transforming traditional stories into many different configurations. The fairy tale Snow White is now offered in multiple media forms for both children and adults, including a television show and video game.

Yeh et al. (2023) suggest that user-generated content (UGC) should be considered as folklore, especially in mental health communities, because it conveys informal, unofficial knowledge through first-hand stories of treatment experiences. These narratives, often shared on YouTube, serve to educate and transmit culture, much like traditional folklore. They provide insight into mental health consumers' experiences with antidepressants, highlighting where they obtain information, gaps in their knowledge, and obstacles to seeking or continuing treatment. UGC in the form of YouTube reviews reflects dynamic, recurring expressions that function as a modern-day method of passing on informal knowledge.

== See also ==
- Applied folklore
- Costumbrismo
- Intangible cultural heritage
- Memetics
- The law of conservation of misery
