= Family folklore =

Branch of folkloristics

Family folklore is the branch of folkloristics concerned with the study and use of folklore and traditional culture transmitted within an individual family group. This includes craft goods produced by family members or memorabilia that have been saved as reminders of family events. It includes family photos, photo albums, along with bundles of other pages held for posterity such as certificates, letters, journals, notes, and shopping lists. Family sayings and stories which recount true events are retold as a means of maintaining a common family identity. Family customs are performed, modified, sometimes forgotten, created or resurrected with great frequency. Each time the result is to define and solidify the perception of the family as unique.

Family folklore has long been included in the documentation of regional, ethnic, religious or occupational groups. Responding to a call in 1958 from oral history pioneer Mody Boatright to document the "family saga", folklorists responded with published accounts of stories and traditions passed down in their own families. In the 1970s began to be considered a defining element of the family group. L. Karen Baldwin's unpublished dissertation (1975) laid the further theoretical groundwork for family folklore "… not only is the family a folk group, but it is also the first folk group anyone belongs to."

Thereafter the field broadened to include the expanding definition of family. The conventional extended family, consisting of a heterosexual married couple with children and grandparents, now incorporates gay partners, unmarried committed relationships and children adopted or born through non-traditional methods and procedures. Family traditions themselves are changing accordingly.

The study of family folklore is distinct from genealogy or family history. Instead of focusing on historical dates, locations and verifiable events, this area of study looks at the unique stories, customs, and handicrafts that define the family as a distinct social group. Family lore often changes to convey a sense of the family and a set of values. Family lore defines the family story. In 1996, American folklorist Barre Toelken wrote:

For an individual family, folklore is its creative expression of a common past. As raw experiences are transformed into family stories, expression, and photos, they are codified in forms which can easily be recalled, retold, and enjoyed. Their drama and beauty are heightened, and the family’s past becomes accessible as it is reshaped according to its needs and desires. … Its stories, photographs, and traditions are personalized and often creative distillations of experience, worked and reworked over time.

== Folklore ==
A child is born or adopted into an established family group, which contains a microcosm of the social alignments found in many larger groups: the vertical relationship between grandparents and grandchildren, the horizontal relationship between siblings and cousins of a generation or age group, clusters of girls or boys and skill-based family alliances. The child grows up in this family and learns the family lore as it is performed throughout the seasons and the life cycle. The family is the first folk group of the child, and "the group in which important primary folkloric socialization takes place and individual aesthetic preference patterns".

The dynamics of family folklore change through the addition of children, but especially via the regular incorporation of new adult family members through each marriage or a committed relationship. With the formation of each new family node, a unique subset and combination of the customs and traditions of both families are incorporated into a new story, both modifying and enriching the current family lore.

As the definition of family broadened to encompass more arrangements, the folklore associated with those arrangements came to be considered family folklore.

== Transmission ==
The transmission of individual stories and customs within a family depends for the most part upon the personality, character and lifestyle of its members. No single member typically is responsible for passing along family lore. As a family reshapes itself around each birth, death, marriage or other life event, individual members pick up items of family lore to own and perform. This might be learning a skill, telling a story (or story cycle) or baking a traditional dessert for a holiday table. Individual items can be picked up by multiple family members, for example when grown siblings adopt a family recipe or tradition in their households. This type of transmission through multiple individuals was first described in an article by Dégh and Vázsonyi as "multi-conduit transmission". By choosing to own a piece of the family lore, family members signify that this tradition embodies beliefs and values to which they adhere. By spreading it to the rest of the family, these beliefs and values come to define the family.

Multiple spheres within the family and household have been "traditionally" defined as the purview of one gender or the other, creating an intersection between folklore studies and gender studies. Thus transmission runs through either the male or the female lines. An obvious area of gender-related transmission is seen in the kitchen, where food preparation and mealtime customs have historically been performed by women. In the course of everyday meal preparation, family folklore is typically transmitted from mother to daughter. A variant of this is seen when a man takes over the preparation of a special meal or special recipe. One common example of this practice is described by Thomas Adler in the article "Making Pancakes on Sunday: The Male Cook in Family Tradition".

A different gender-related variation in folklore transmission is seen in storytelling. The same story can be shaped and told differently each family member, even though they were both present at the original event. For an event occurring during the apple harvest, for example, a woman's narration might include details of the apple butter recipe they were preparing at the time. In contrast, the man's narration might give only enough detail to "make a point worth telling". This gender-based variance has been studied by Baldwin and Margaret Yocum. They found "… women's telling to be more collaborative, interruptible, and filled with information and genealogy; men's telling, by contrast, is often uninterrupted and more competitive."

Deference is typically to family member who is the designated performer of a specific custom or tradition, even though the custom is known to everyone. When the "last basketmaker" dies, another member steps up to become new "last basketmaker." No one else performs the tradition as long as the designated bearer of the tradition is available, as family members acknowledge this individual as the (current) keeper of this tradition. "Traditional deference" can be found in many folk groups but is particularly evident within the family group.

== Detritus of family lore ==
If family lore which is picked up and transmitted represents the chosen familial beliefs and values, then lore that does not support and enhance these values becomes problematic. Therefore, items such as newspaper clippings on arrests, photographs of estranged members, stories of infidelities, or papers about a dishonorable discharge from military service often are not saved.

Family traditions may be lost or modified in response to difficult family events. This is obvious when one of the tradition bearers has died. If no one steps up, the tradition is lost. In a divorce one parent is frequently no longer available to play his or her role in the established traditions. The customary tall Christmas tree decorated by the (missing) tall father might be traded in for a short tree for the children to decorate. Ornaments may be discarded and new ones purchased. The toy train is no longer set up. These became the new traditions.

When the tradition is too painful in a certain circumstance, it may temporarily be held in abeyance until the circumstance changes. If one storyteller dies, hearing one of the stories may for a time remind family members more of the lost storyteller than of the story's subject.

Each family passes its traditions from generation to generation. New members do not recognize family customs as "traditional" and must learn of their significance. New members also bring their own traditions that need to be reconciled with the existing set.

== Forms ==
In the 1970s, family folklore began to be investigated as a defining element of the family group. As part of this investigation, the Smithsonian Folklife Festival in Washington, D.C. set up a tent for several years to collect the family lore of festival visitors. The goal was to establish an archive of family folklore as part of the Smithsonian collections. Using taped interviews, representative pieces were published in the book A Celebration of American Family Folklore: Tales and Traditions from the Smithsonian Collection.

=== Stories and sayings ===
A family story recounts a historical event concerning specific family members. Seasoned with time and re-telling, the story gets revised to express specific values and character treasured family traits. Instead of historical accuracy, the narration becomes a medium to restate and re-enforce shared values. These stories generally take the form of an anecdote and follow the pattern of traditional tales. A favorite family story might tell how the parents met, or how one parent chose the other among rivals. According to one family's story, the prospective bride had to untie all the knots in a string to demonstrate her care and diligence. Another family tells how the young couple was stuck at the top of a Ferris wheel when he proposed, and she had either to say yes or jump. Given time and repetition, the anecdotes serve to shape the overall family story, populating it with real individuals and historical events that are made personal.

The setting for telling family stories becomes part of the tradition. It can include family occasions, a particular location and/or a designated raconteur. Such elements need to be documented as part of the storytelling tradition. In one family, for example, following a holiday meal the men would retire to the study and the women would move into the kitchen. At some point in the cleanup, usually, after the best dishes had been washed and put away, the mother would bring out a bottle of schnapps to help complete the work. This became the trigger for family stories and jokes, with the laughter from the kitchen bringing the men to join in.

Another type of verbal lore common within family groups is the unique family expression or saying. A saying can be created at any time; it starts as a one-time utterance of a family member. Through repetition, it becomes a shorthand reference to the original and the current situation. In one family, the saying "… good worker, very strong" signifies that the speaker wants to come along, and would be a valuable addition to the planned undertaking. This expression originally referred to as a first move of the family, a move that current family members took no part in." Even so, the saying becomes a code word for all family members, with different or no meaning to others as well as to re-enforce and strengthen the family's shared experience and history.

=== Photos, letters, journals and other papers ===
Family archival material can take many forms, including papers, news clippings, photographs, letters, notes, journals, and receipts. Their value as additions to the family story is often unclear. The materials are passed along until they are either thrown out in a move, destroyed in a fire, or find an owner within the family who has the interest and time to curate them.

The largest collection of papers is frequently photographs, either kept in a drawer or labeled and organized into albums. Each photo documents a single moment; yet taken together they create a visual history of the family. They serve as triggers for memories, stories and events in the life of a family. They are brought out at gatherings and used to commemorate events such as a birth, a wedding or a funeral.,

Photos of naked babies on carpets or in the wading pool, generational portraits gathered around the baby the first day of school, a birthday gathering, can be found in many family albums.

As with storytelling, the occasion for photo-taking itself becomes a family tradition. Year after year, the same pictures are snapped; documenting a family that is growing and changing, adding and subtracting members, detailing a new location. The camera can be as much a part of the celebration as the birthday cake or the menorah.

The twenty-first century ubiquity of cameras and social networks dramatically changed the tradition of family photos and photo albums. Video recordings and video-conferencing allow for a daily family log to be created. Presentations of slideshows and video documentaries became commonplace.

Some families amassed collections of letters and other papers written by or about family members. One family, in sorting through such papers, discovered all diplomas for family members from 2nd-grade Sunday school up through doctoral degrees. Other documents include the family Bible, military enlistment/discharge papers, and marriage, birth and baptismal certificates. While certificates authenticate the dates and events' history, letters and journals can reveal the character and thoughts of individual family members.

Similar to photographs, letters and journal entries document individual moments in the life of a family member. Once these papers are saved, it falls to the following generations to evaluate them.

The introduction of electronic messaging means that paper documents are no longer as regularly generated. Electronic communication is seldom printed. The 19th and 20th centuries saw dramatic increases in literacy and the resources to create and preserve paper documents. Now, these forms of family history and lore are themselves becoming history. The rapid evolution of personal digital storage media (from magnetic tape to magnetic disks to optical disks to flash drives and the cloud has meant that many digital documents of recent vintage are inaccessible because the technology to access them is no longer available.

=== Customs ===
One major area of family traditions revolves around food, spanning cultivation, procurement, preparation, serving, eating and cleanup. Customs affect daily life and special occasions. Assumptions about how this occurs—who does what and when—are challenged when the established process (i.e. family custom) hits a snag: we've run out of rice or someone ate the last of the olives. Sunday morning pancakes lose their meaning if the cook is away. Family mealtimes differ; types of food vary by time of day and day of week.

Holiday meals are highly ritualized in many cultures, but still vary by family. They can be characterized by food type, meal timing, preparation method, etc.

Another significant family tradition involves naming customs. When a baby is born, family names are often given to the arrival, although this varies by culture and era.

=== Heirlooms ===
Possessions are pieces of material culture—objects with which members of a culture customarily surround themselves. However, family folklore is focused only on handicrafts produced by family members and memorabilia passed along through generations.

Memorabilia are objects with attached stories and memories. In one family a doll, given once as a gift, continued to be brought out each year to celebrate a holiday. As part of the tradition, the doll's picture is taken with the changing family. For the doll's hundredth birthday, a birthday cake was included. Any object imbued with family stories and memories becomes a family heirloom. As such, it holds in the family a value often unrelated to its monetary value. As the stories and memories enveloping the object fade, the object itself may lose its significance.

Handicrafts are objects that were "homemade", crafted by family members. The skills for such artisanal crafts may be transmitted within the family. The include knitting, weaving, welding, pottery, woodworking, quilting or basketry. The handicrafts can be functional or decorative. Over time these handicrafts are nurtured within the family, as become a point of family identification for outsiders. The family cultivates both the product knowledge and the objects themselves.

Family handicrafts are generally one-of-a-kind. Many family members can tell the story of the doll or keep photographs, but only one family branch can actually possess the doll. A crafter could decide to create a cap or toy for each child.

These objects allow family members to gather objects from different times or generations and experience them together. For example, consider an heirloom bowl. The bowl helps preserve the family history and identity both for the family member who walks past the bowl sitting on the counter and the outsider who asks about the origin of the unique item. "The artifacts that family members make, use, or display can be an unseen backdrop to the duties and demands of family life. Alternatively, they might be carefully crafted statements about the values and expectations of family tradition bearers."

== Institutional support ==
=== Smithsonian Center for Folklife and Cultural Heritage ===
The Smithsonian Folklife Festival takes place annually on the National Mall in Washington, D.C., to exhibit and demonstrate crafts and customs of diverse ethnic, regional and occupational groups. Each exhibit endeavors to move beyond the items of tangible culture, the arts and objects we can touch, feel and put in a glass case. Each performance or display articulates the goal of the Smithsonian Institution to spread its reach beyond material objects to artifacts of intangible cultural heritage. Festival exhibits such as "The Changing Soundscape in Indian Country" (1992), "American Social Dance" (1993), "Mississippi Delta" (1997), "Asian Pacific Americans: Local Lives, Global Ties" (2010) are some of the exhibits. The festival's goal to "legitimize and celebrate individual Americans and their traditions".

At its inception in 1967 it offered only displays from the United States. In 1974 a new tent was added. Instead of displaying or performing recognized traditions, its goal was to collect items of family folklore from visitors. This tent was unique in asking visitors to be active contributors to the folklore on display instead of spectators. A sign at the tent was hopeful: "Family Folklore—Will You Share Yours With Us?" Interviewers with recorders were on hand to prompt, listen and record visitors' descriptions of family lore. Visitors could see their family traditions represented elsewhere in the exhibits, and could recognize and record parts of their stories.

During the four years that the tent was included at the festival, it gradually became cluttered with objects, memorabilia, and photos. Taking the interviews as a baseline, the stories and customs collected in the tent were used to establish an archive of family folklore as part of the Smithsonian collections. Representative pieces were then published in the book A Celebration of American Family Folklore: Tales and Traditions from the Smithsonian Collection. This collection continues to be supported by the Smithsonian Center for Folklife and Cultural Heritage and the American Folklife Center at the Library of Congress.

Many regional festivals have been established across the US. These include the Northwest Folklife Festival, the New England Folk Festival and the Philadelphia Folk Festival. Each of these is supported by various institutions of public folklore, with the goal of displaying traditions of regional, ethnic and occupational folk groups.

=== The Folklore Society ===
The Folklore Society (FLS) is a London-based learned society devoted to folklore, including folktales, traditional song and dance, folk plays, childlore, folk religion, etc. The society fosters the research and documentation of folklore worldwide.

The society publishes the journal Folklore. It is one of the earliest English-language journals in the field of folkloristics, first published as The Folk-Lore Record in 1878. Folklore's content varies from ethnographical and analytical essays on popular religion and belief, language, arts and crafts to reviews, analysis and debate on a wide range of adjacent disciplines.

=== Oral history and oral tradition projects ===
Oral history and oral tradition first became recognized as legitimate forms of historical and cultural research in the 1960s and early 1970s. A Pulitzer Prize was awarded to Studs Terkel in 1985 for his book The Good War: An Oral History of World War II and a special Pulitzer Prize was awarded to Alex Haley in 1977 for Roots: The Saga of an American Family. These awards established the importance of oral histories and traditions as a bona fide tool of historical and cultural research.

Historical and folklore research using oral interviews launched multiple organizations dedicated to its collection. One of the best-known organizations is StoryCorps, founded in 2003 and modeled on the WPA Federal Writers' Project. Its mission is to "record, preserve, and share stories of Americans from all backgrounds and beliefs." Special projects reach out to targeted populations to fulfill StoryCorps' commitment to record a diverse array of voices. The only requirement for the two-person interview is that the participants "care about each other," such as members of the same family. The participants are given a recording of the interview to take with them to add to the family archive.

Other organizations abound, such as City Lore of New York City and the Oral History Society of London.
