= Children's Games (Bruegel) =

Painting by Pieter Bruegel the Elder

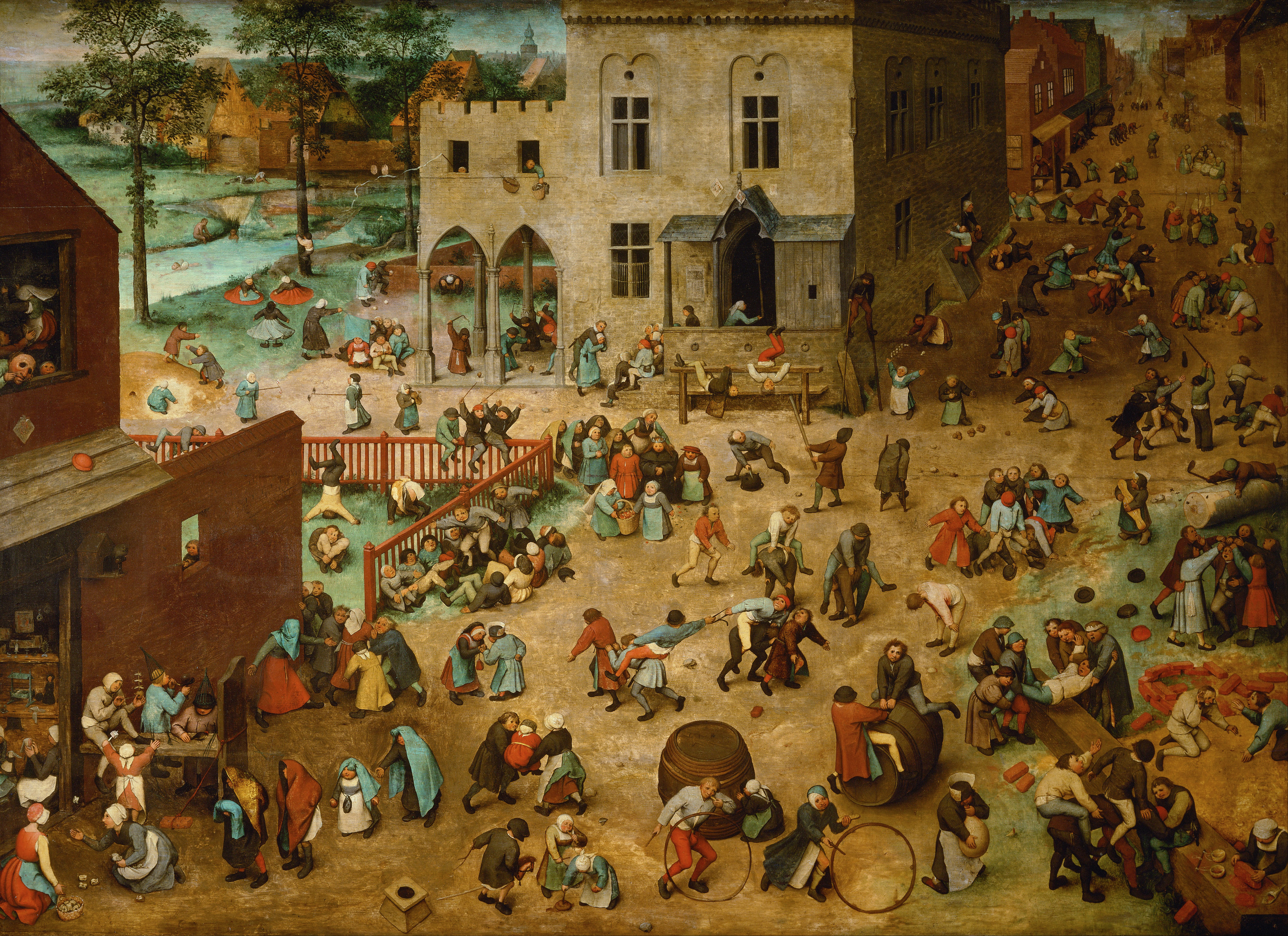
- Pieter Bruegel the Elder, Children’s Games
- Artist: Pieter Bruegel the Elder
- Year: 1560
- Type: Oil on panel
- Dimensions: 118 cm × 161 cm (46 in × 63 in)
- Location: Kunsthistorisches Museum, Vienna

Children's Games is an oil-on-panel by Flemish Renaissance artist Pieter Bruegel the Elder, painted in 1560. It is now in the Kunsthistorisches Museum in Vienna. The entire composition is full of children playing a wide variety of games. Over 90 different games that were played by children at the time have been identified.

== Description ==
This painting, mentioned for the first time by Karel van Mander in 1604, was acquired in 1594 by Archduke Ernest of Austria. It was suggested that it was the first in a projected series of paintings representing the Ages of Man, in which Children's Games would have stood for Youth. If that was Bruegel's intention, it is unlikely the series progressed beyond this painting, because there are no contemporary or subsequent mentions of related pictures.

The children, who range in age from toddlers to adolescents, roll hoops, walk on stilts, spin hoops, ride hobby-horses, stage mock tournaments, play leap-frog and blind man's bluff, perform handstands, inflate pigs' bladders and play with dolls and other toys. They have also taken over the building that dominates the square: it may be a town hall or some other important civic building, in this way emphasizing the moral that the adults who direct civic affairs are as children in the sight of God. This crowded scene is to some extent relieved by the landscape in the top left-hand corner; but even here children are bathing in the river and playing on its banks.

The artist's intention for this work is more serious than simply to compile an illustrated encyclopedia of children's games, though some eighty particular games have been identified. Bruegel shows the children absorbed in their games with the seriousness displayed by adults in their apparently more important pursuits. His moral is that in the mind of God, children's games possess as much significance as the activities of their parents. This idea was a familiar one in contemporary literature: in an anonymous Flemish poem published in Antwerp in 1530 by Jan van Doesborch, mankind is compared to children who are entirely absorbed in their foolish games and concerns.

== The games ==
Starting from bottom left, the games may be identified as follows:

Number	Image	Game	Notes
01	Playing with dolls	Playing with dolls	
02	Playing 'Holy Mass'	Playing 'Holy Mass'	Small liturgical objects used at Mass and Liturgies
03	Water gun and owl on support	Water gun and owl on support	Shooting water at a bird
04	Wearing masks	Wearing masks	Wearing disguises for fun
05	Swinging from a hanging seat	Swinging from a hanging seat	The classic hanging seat
06	Climbing a fence	Climbing a fence	
07	Handstand	Handstand	
08	Play the "knot"	Play the "knot"	Bending the body to contorted positions
09	Somersault	Somersault	Flipping and rolling forwards, backwards, or sideways
10	Fence riding	Fence riding	Pretending the fence is a horse
11	Mock wedding	Mock wedding	It is exactly at the diagonal centre of the panel. Perhaps an irony of the holy sacrament, or a reference to the main event that allows conception of children. Mock child weddings have been common folk tradition many places in Europe, and were celebrated at Midsummer.
12	Passing through kicking legs - running the gauntlet	Passing through kicking legs - running the gauntlet	
13	Blind Man's Bluff	Blind Man's Bluff	One player is blindfolded and then disoriented by being spun around. The other players call out to the "blind man" who attempts to tag them before they dodge away.
14	Playing with birds	Playing with birds	
14b	Making hats with twigs	Making hats with twigs	The child in the blue tunic is wearing a hat woven from twigs.
15	Blowing bubbles	Blowing bubbles	Still a popular pastime, Bruegel shows children blowing bubbles with clay pipes and verifies soap bubbles being used as entertainment for at least 400 years
16	Shell bobbin	Shell bobbin	A flying spinneret made of nut shells
17	Teetotum	Teetotum	Forerunner of the roulette and dice games
17b	Toy animal with leash	Toy animal with leash	A stone dog of sorts
18	Knucklebones	Knucklebones	Game of very ancient origin, played with five small objects, originally the "knucklebones" (actually the astragalus: a bone in the ankle, or hock) of a sheep, which are thrown up and caught in various ways; more commonly known as playing jacks.
19	Mock baptismal	Mock baptismal	Re-enacting the procession of adults carrying home a baby just baptized. The blue hood symbolises deception ("hooding the husband" meant to cuckold him, as shown in Bruegel's Netherlandish Proverbs).
20	A hand game	A hand game	Possibly the morra, a hand game - similar to rock, paper, scissors - that dates back thousands of years to ancient Roman and Greek times
21	Piñata	Piñata	A papier-mâché or other type of container that is decorated, filled with toys and or candy and then broken, usually as part of a ceremony or celebration
22	Walk on stilts	Walk on stilts	Walking poles equipped with steps for the feet to stand on, they can be short (like here) or long (see number 62)
23	Play leapfrog	Play leapfrog	Vaulting over each other's stooped backs
24	Mock tournaments	Mock tournaments	Competitions of various kind
25	The "Pope's seat"	The "Pope's seat"	Holding the child by gripping hands
26	Hobby-horse	Hobby-horse	Riding a wooden hobby horse made of a straight stick with a small horse's head
27	Stirring excrement with a stick	Stirring excrement with a stick	
28	Playing the flute and the drum	Playing the flute and the drum	Playing simple music with basic instruments, always popular with kids
29	The simple roll hoop	The simple roll hoop	Children and adults around the world have played with hoops, twirling, rolling and throwing them throughout history
30	Shouting into a barrel from a hole	Shouting into a barrel from a hole	The many uses of a barrel
31	The hoop with bells	The hoop with bells	A variation of rolling the hoop
32	Riding the barrel	Riding the barrel	With barrel vaulting, another popular play
33	Hat throwing	Hat throwing	Throw them through a child's open legs, or see who throws the furthest
34	Raisinbread man	Raisinbread man	A man-shaped loaf of bread, most likely some sort of Dutch duivekater, offered during wakes or at Christmas
35	The penalty of "bumbouncing"	The penalty of "bumbouncing"	Bouncing someone's buttocks on planks
36	Ball made with an inflated animal bladder	Ball made with an inflated animal bladder	Inflating a bladder to create a balloon or ball
37	Buck buck	Buck buck	A group of children had to create a "pony" and another had to leap on their backs until the weight made it crumble
38	To play shop	To play shop	On the wooden plank below the funnel Bruegel inscribed "BRUEGEL 1560" Red pigment was made from scraping bricks and was most famous from Antwerp.
39	Playing Tiddlywinks	Playing Tiddlywinks	Played with small discs called "winks", a pot, and a collection of squidgers. The children use a "squidger" (a disk) to propel a wink into flight by pressing down on a wink, thereby flicking it into the air: the objective is to score points by sending one's own winks into the pot
39b	Playing Mumblety-peg	Playing Mumblety-peg	An old outdoor game played by children using pocketknives
40	Building (a well)	Building (a well)	
41	Pulling hair	Pulling hair	May be a game or a fight
42	Catching insects with a net	Catching insects with a net	
43	Playing the scourge	Playing the scourge	
44	Playing marbles	Playing marbles	Ancient throwing game
45	Pitch and toss	Pitch and toss	Players each grab a coin and take turns tossing them towards the wall: the coin that is closest to the wall wins
45b	Twirling a hat on a stick	Twirling a hat on a stick	
46	Making a procession	Making a procession	Popular among children and adults, in diverse applications
47	Playing the porter	Playing the porter	
48	Who's got the ball?	Who's got the ball?	Hiding the ball and guessing who has it
49	Riding piggyback	Riding piggyback	Riding on another's shoulders
50	Singing door-to-door	Singing door-to-door	
51	Bonfire	Bonfire	Lighting a fire
52	Riding a broom	Riding a broom	A variation of hobby-horse, but with many players
53	Pushing a wall	Pushing a wall	
54	Hide-and-seek	Hide-and-seek	Or "hide and go seek", a game where a number of players conceal themselves in the environment, to be found by one or more seekers
55	The "devil's tail" or "crack the whip"	The "devil's tail" or "crack the whip"	One player, chosen as the "head" of the tail or whip, runs around in random directions with subsequent players holding onto the hand of the previous player. The entire "tail" of the whip moves in those directions, but with much more force toward the end of the tail.
56	Grappling	Grappling	A basic form of wrestling
57	The "devil chained"	The "devil chained"	Role play as a street game
58	Run, jump on a cellar's door	Run, jump on a cellar's door	
59	Bowling	Bowling	Players attempt to score points by rolling a ball along a flat surface, either into pins or to get close to a target ball
60	The token	The token	Running and handing off the baton to the next runner
61	Throwing walnuts	Throwing walnuts	Perhaps a variation of bowling or bocce, hitting an assembled cluster of nuts
62	High stilts	High stilts	Walking on long poles
63	Pole vaulting	Pole vaulting	Exercising on a horizontally fixed bar
64	Balancing a stick on a finger	Balancing a stick on a finger	A clownish game of balance
65	Put up a show	Put up a show	Enacting a play
66	Spinning tops	Spinning tops	Using toys that can be spun on an axis, balancing on a point
67	The trolleys	The trolleys	Baskets moving on a line
68	Flying a ribbon on a stick	Flying a ribbon on a stick	Letting a piece of cloth fly in the wind from a stick
69	Whom shall I choose?	Whom shall I choose?	A girl selects her "baby" from a group of friends under a blanket
70	Urinating	Urinating	
71	Bocce	Bocce	In teams, throwing the bocce balls closest to the jack ball
72	Pirouetting skirts	Pirouetting skirts	Swirling the girls' skirts round and round
73	Climbing a tree	Climbing a tree	
74	Swimming	Swimming	A healthy recreational exercise, enjoying a full-body workout
75	Diving	Diving	Jumping or falling into water is always fun for children
76	Floating with an inflated pig's bladder	Floating with an inflated pig's bladder	A sheep's bladder was also used, to float on top of it or to play water games
77	"Dethroning the King"	"Dethroning the King"	A game also known as "king of the hill"
78	Playing with sand	Playing with sand	Popular with children across the world
79	Coil tournament	Coil tournament	A fight of knights
80	Rattles	Rattles	Noisy musical game

== See also ==
- List of paintings by Pieter Bruegel the Elder
