= Buck buck =

Outdoor children's game

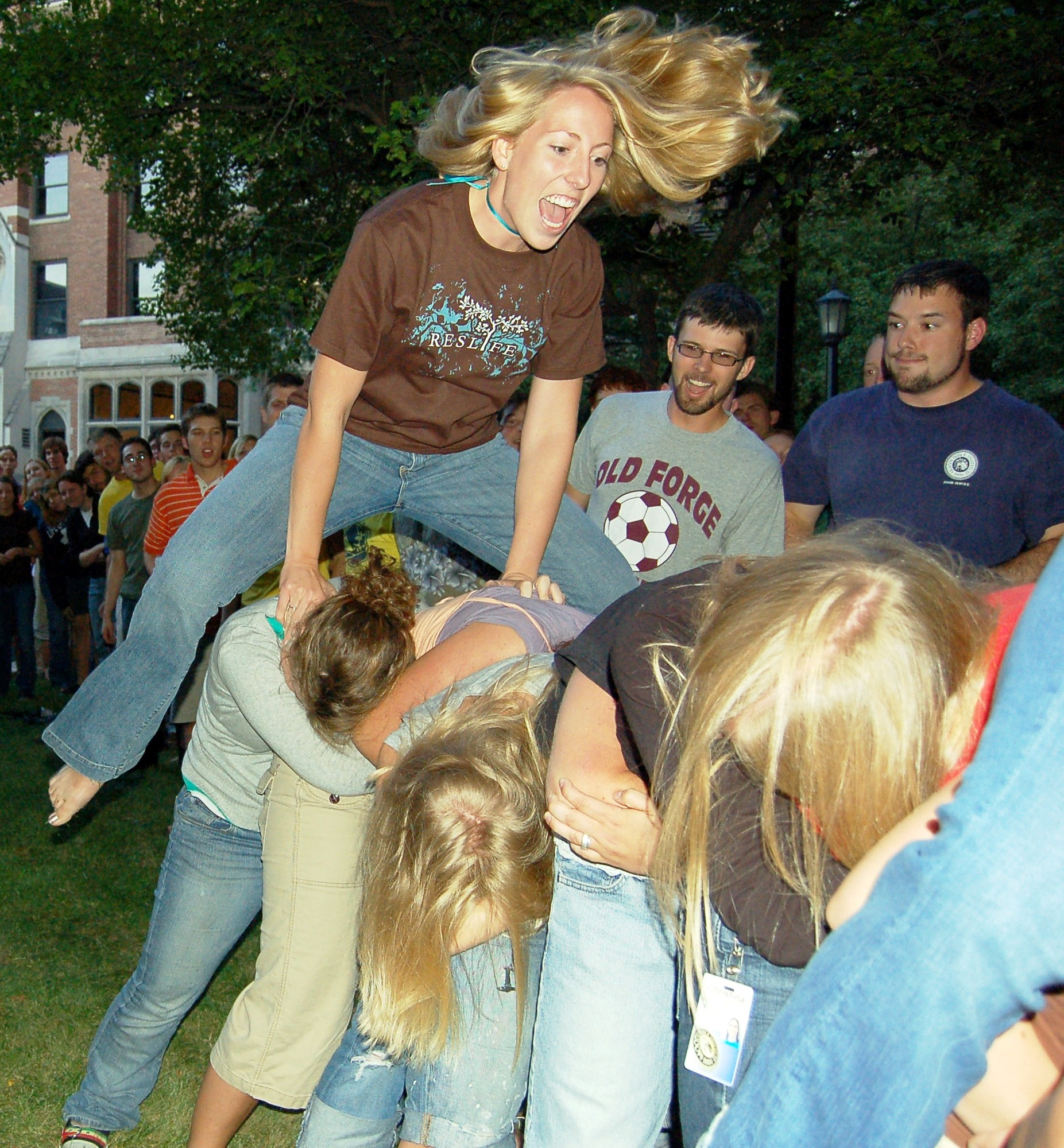
College students playing the game (United States, 2006)

Buck buck (also known as Johnny-on-a-Pony, or Johnny-on-the-Pony) is a children's game with several variants. One version of the game is played when "one player hops onto another's back" and the climber guesses "the number of certain objects out of sight". Another version of the game is played with "one group of players [jumping] onto the backs of a second group in order to build as large a pile as possible or to cause the supporting players to collapse."

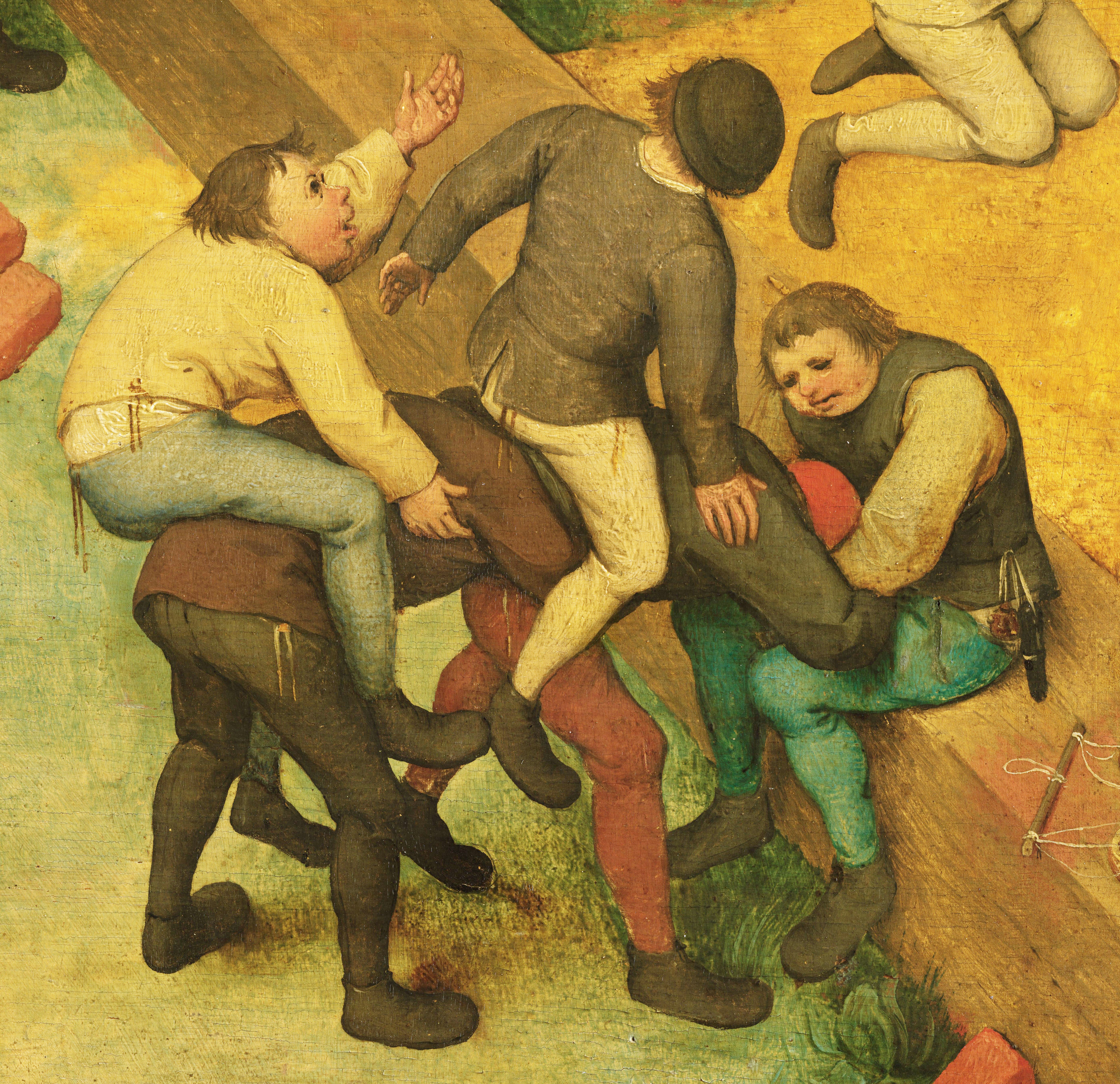
Children's Games (1560) by Pieter Bruegel the Elder shows five boys playing buck buck

As early as the 16th century, children in Europe and the Near East played Buck, Buck, which had been called "Bucca Bucca quot sunt hic?" Pieter Bruegel's painting Children's Games (1560) depicts children playing a variant of the game. Folklorists Iona and Peter Opie claim that the game goes back to the time of Nero in the first century.

== Other national names and variants ==
In the United Kingdom, the game is sometimes called High Cockalorum, but has a large number of different names in various local dialects. These include: "Polly on the Mopstick" in Birmingham, "Strong Horses, Weak Donkeys" in Monmouthshire, "Hunch, Cuddy, Hunch" in west Scotland, "Mont-a-Kitty" in Middlesbrough, "Husky Fusky Finger or Thumb" in Nottinghamshire, "High Jimmy Knacker" in east London, "Jump the Knacker 1-2-3" in Watford, "Wall-e-Acker" or "Warny Echo" in north West London, "Stagger Loney" in Cardiff, "Pomperino" in St Ives, Cornwall and "Trust" in Lancashire. The game is sometimes played in the sergeants' or officers' messes of the British Armed Forces.

In Mexico and El Paso, the game is known as el chinche de agua (water bug).

In the Chile, the game is called Caballito de Bronce (Little Brass Horse)

In Australia a similar game is called "stacks-on" the goal being to jump onto the player declared by yelling "stacks-on <name>". The declared player attempts to remain upright, while the other players all try and jump on top of them until they collapse.

A similar game malttukbakgi (말뚝박기) is played in South Korea, by children up until high school. In malttukbakgi, there are two teams. The first team has one person stand up against the wall and the rest of the team queue behind them with their heads tucked between the legs of the person in front, in a formation that resembles a long "horse". The second team then jumps up onto the backs of the first team one by one, with as much force as possible. If anyone from any team falls to the floor, that team loses. If everyone stays up, then the person against the wall and the person in front play a game of gawibawibo (rock paper scissors) to determine the winner.

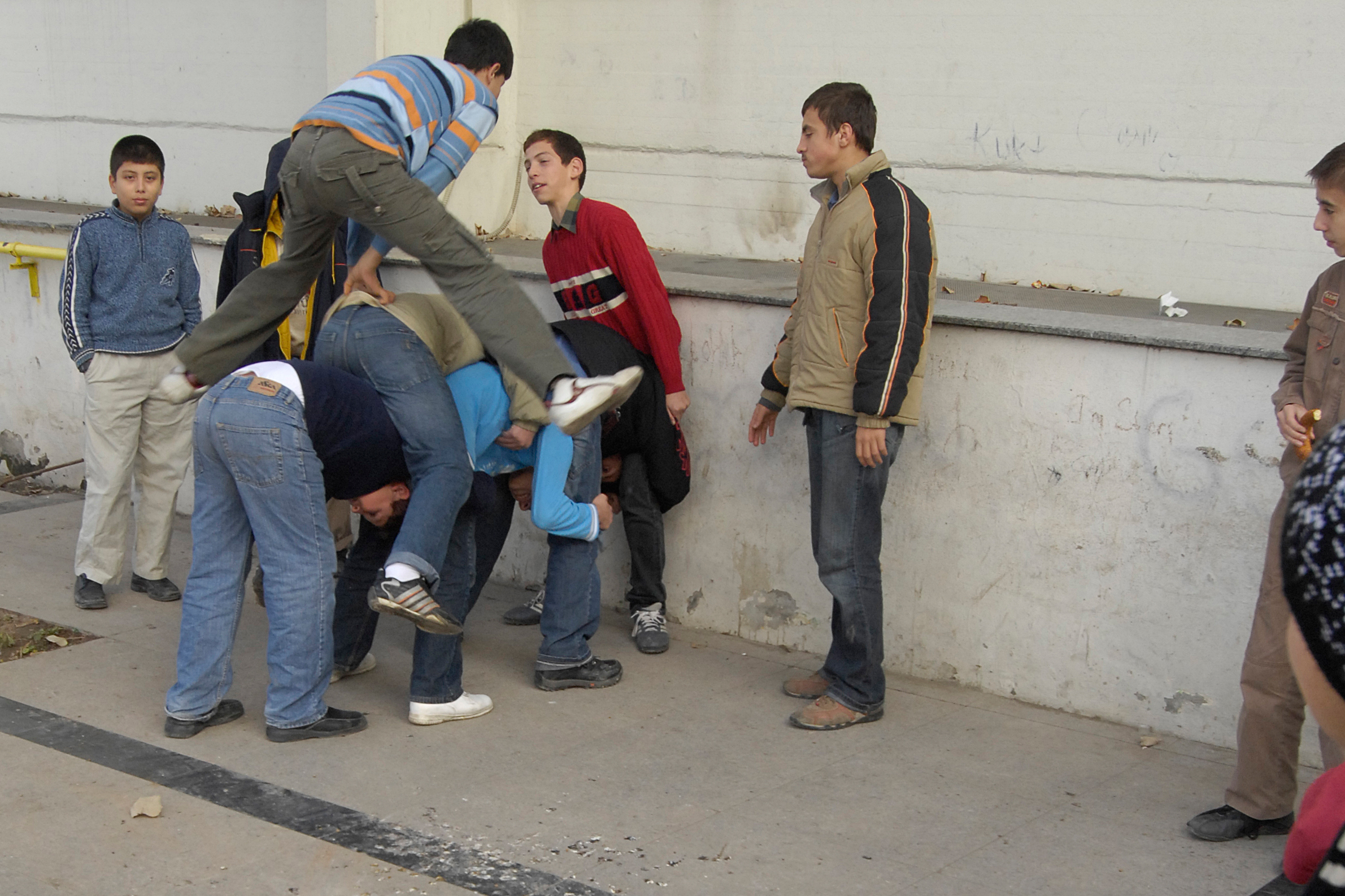
Players of uzun eşek

In Turkey, a similar game is uzun eşek ("long donkey"). The person standing up is the referee and is called the "pillow". One team bends over, then the other team one by one jumps on the "donkey". If the Donkey can stand the pressure, the first person to go in the jumping team puts up one or two with his fingers. If the donkey can guess the number right, they are permitted to jump. If the jumpers fall to the ground, it is the donkey's turn to jump. If the donkey falls, the jumpers jump again.

In Romania, the game is referred to as lapte gros ("thick/condensed milk").

In Indonesia, this game called Kuda Tubruk (Crashed Horse) or Kuda Tomprok (Bumped Horse). This game played with same rules as the Korean one..

== In popular culture ==
Bill Cosby's 1967 album Revenge includes a track "Buck, Buck" in which he describes playing the game as a child. He mentions that in his hometown of Philadelphia it was called "Buck Buck", while in New York City it was known as "Johnny on the Pony". This track introduces Fat Albert, "the baddest Buck Buck breaker in the world," who "weighed 2,000 pounds" and could cause earthquakes when he ran down the street. The character would later become the basis for the cartoon series Fat Albert and the Cosby Kids which includes a buck buck episode (season 1 episode 6). Fat Albert and his friends also play a game of buck buck in the film Fat Albert (2004). The same story, in a slightly different form, is also included in Cosby's book Childhood.

In the 2014 Teenage Mutant Ninja Turtles film, the heroes use a game of buck buck as an attack that is key to their defeat of the main villain.
