= List of children's games =

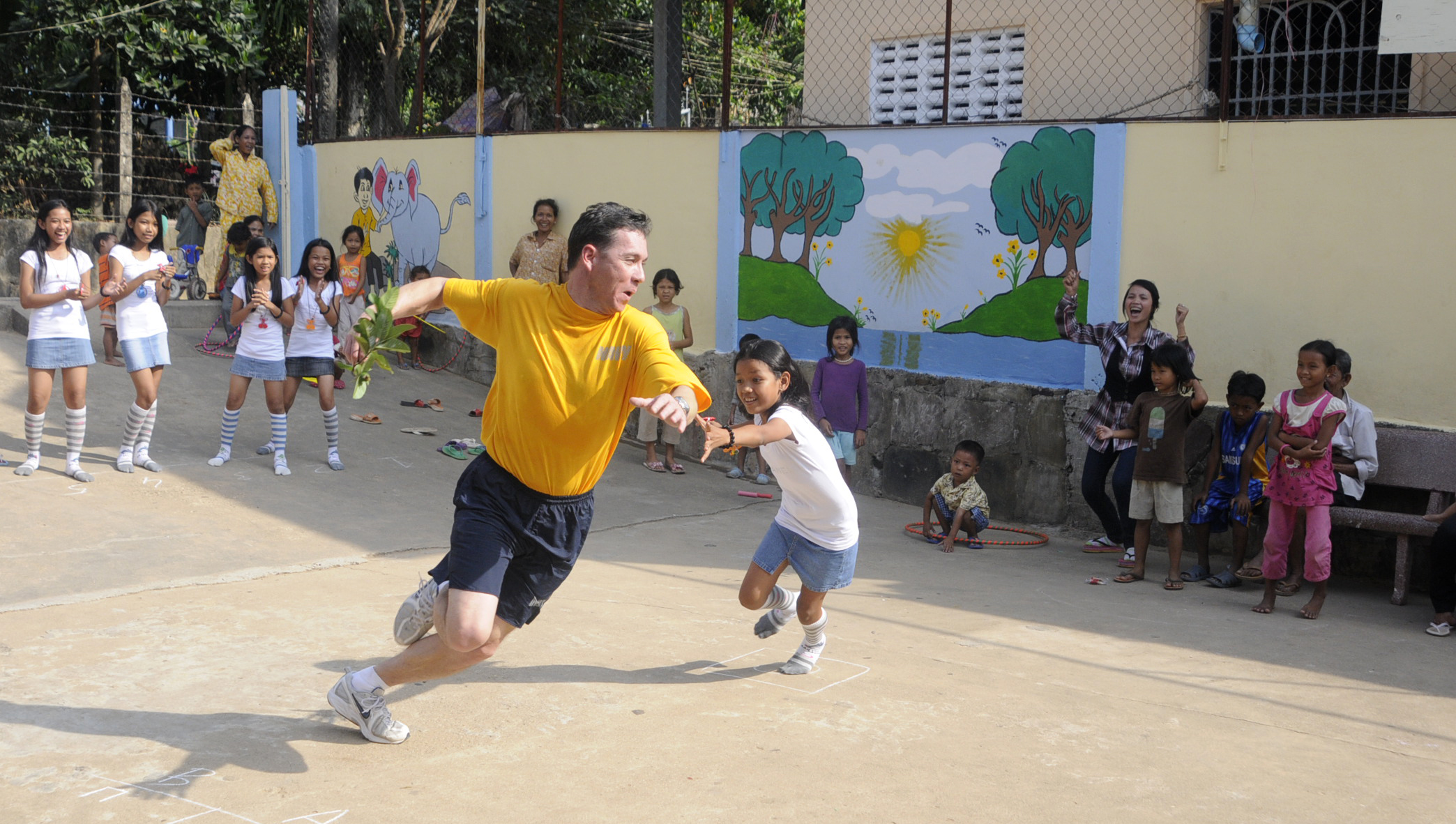
A child playing tag

Traditional children's games, also known as folk games, are played by individuals between an estimated 7–12 years of age, without much equipment or any rules. They do not include commercial products such as board games but do include those which require props such as hopscotch or marbles. (Toys appear in List of toys unless the toys are used in multiple games or the single game played is named after the toy; thus "jump rope" is a game, while "Jacob's ladder" is a toy.) The games persist and evolve, as they are transmitted down to subsequent generations and from one child to another primarily through word of mouth, due to not being considered suitable for academic study or adult attention. Folk games consist of two or more of the following: physical skill, strategy, chance, repetition of patterns, creativity, and vertigo.

== History ==
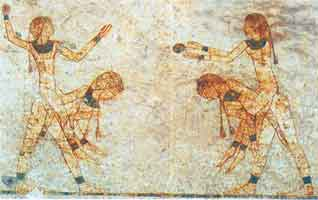
Ancient Egyptian sports game

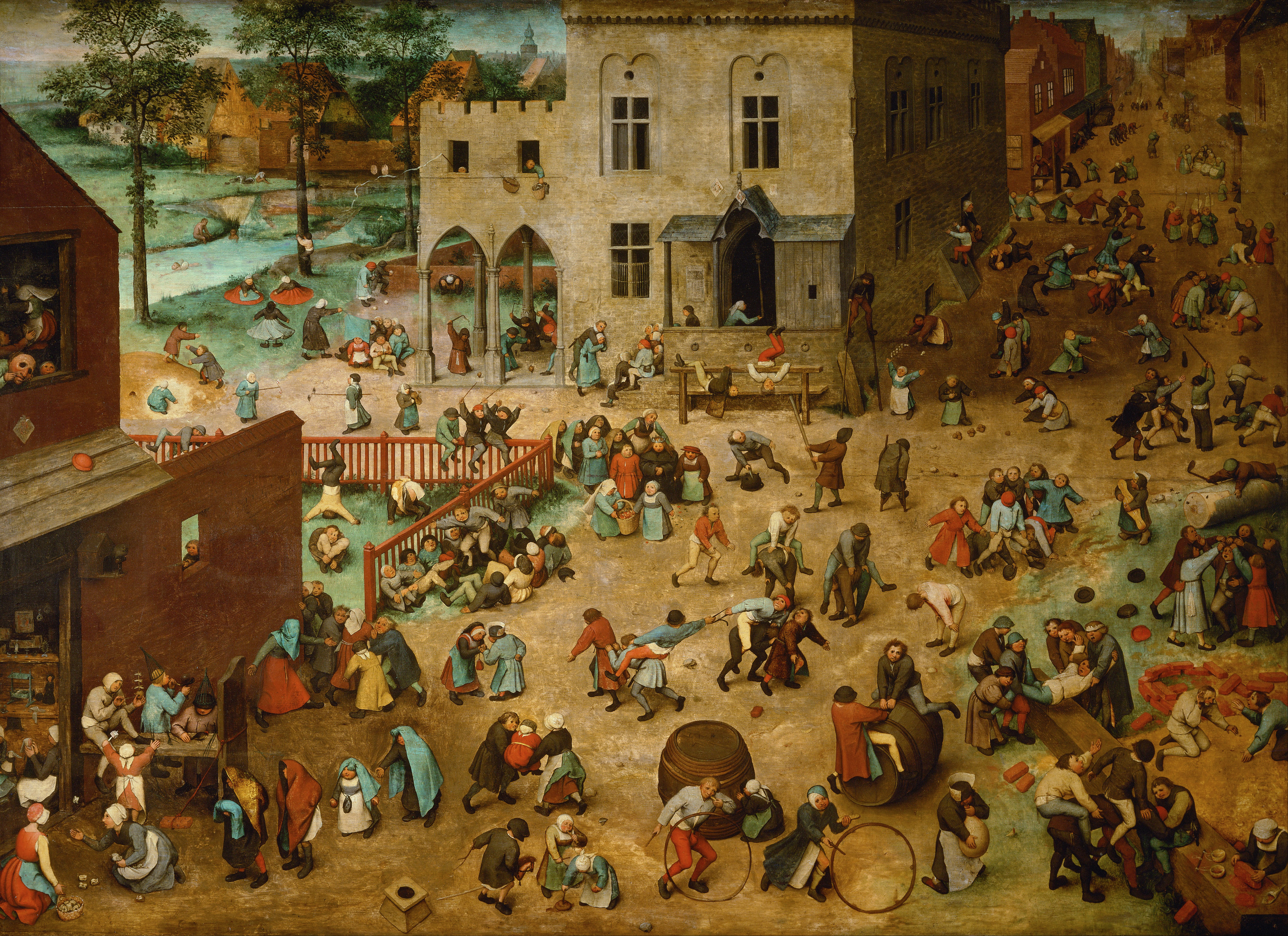
Children's Games (1560)

From the 18th century onwards, researchers have taken a greater interest in the value of traditional games in elucidating cultural values and identities. The modern Olympic Games were influenced by this thinking, and were founded by Pierre de Coubertin on the basis of "All games, all nations", though this aspect of the Olympics was never fully realised and quickly faded away after a few years, with mainly only Western sports being played. In some European countries, the revival of traditional games has served as a way for regional identities to be expressed in a political or educational way.

== Tag games ==
- Tag
  - Ball tag
  - Chain tag
  - Cops and robbers (Cowboys and Indians)
  - Freeze tag
  - Ghost in the graveyard
  - Kiss chase
  - Stuck in the mud
- Atya-patya
- Blind man's buff
- British Bulldog
- Capture the flag (Stealing Sticks)
- Duck, duck, goose
- Duck on a rock
- Kabaddi
- Kho-kho
- Kick the can
- Langdi
- Marco Polo
- Monkey on Woodchips (Grounders)
- Patintero
- Pie
- Poison
- Puss in the corner
- Ringolevio
- Sharks and minnows
- Statues (red light, green light; Grandmother's Footsteps)
- Tumbang preso
- What's the time, Mr Wolf?
- Chor Police

== Hiding games ==
- Hide-and-seek
- Peekaboo
- Sardines

== Games with equipment ==
- Ball games
- Ball in a Cup
- Baseball
- Basketball
- Beanbag toss
- Blow football
- Catch
- Chinese handball
- Conkers
- Downball
- Continuous cricket
- Dandy shandy
- Dodgeball
- Football
- Four Square (Kingey)
- French cricket
- Gaga
- Handball
- Handball_(schoolyard_game)
- Hoop rolling
- Horseshoes
- Hula hoop
- Kickball
- Kick-to-kick
- Lagori
- Marbles
- Minkey
- Mumblety-peg
- Musical Chairs
- Paddle ball
- Paper football
- Patball
- Punchball
- Queenie
- Silent ball
- Soccer hockey
- Spinning top
- Spud
- Stickball
- String games (cat's cradle)
- Stoop ball
- Tennis
- Tetherball
- Tug of war
- Wallball (children's game)

== Jumping games ==
- Ampe, from Ghana
- Double Dutch (jump rope)
- Jumping Jacks
- Jumping rope (Skipping rope)
- Jumpsies (also known as Chinese jump rope, elastics, or gummitwist)
- Leapfrog

=== Hopping games ===
- Hopscotch
- Langa (game)
- Squid (game)

== Memory games ==
- Chinese whispers (Telephone)
- Concentration
- Here Comes an Old Soldier from Botany Bay (Old Soldier)
- I packed my bag
- Kim's Game

== Parlour games ==
- Hunt the Thimble (Hot and Cold)
- Huckle buckle beanstalk (Hot buttered beans)
- I spy
- Truth or Dare?
- Wink Murder

== Hand games ==
- Bloody knuckles
- Chopsticks
- Clapping games
  - Concentration 64 (clapping, memory game)
  - Double Double This This
  - Down Down Baby
  - Down by the Banks
- Mary Mack
- Pat-a-cake
- Pass the ring
- Red hands
- Rock paper scissors
- Thumb war

== Other traditional children's games ==
- Buck buck (High Cockalorum)
- Bulleribock (Sweden)
- Button, button, who's got the button?
- Counting out
- Crack the whip
- Game of dares
- Floor is Lava
- Follow the leader
- Four corners (game)
- Hangman (game)
- House
- Hurray
- Jinx
- Keep Away (Monkey in the middle)
- Knock, Knock, Ginger (Ding dong ditch)
- Knucklebones (jackstones, Jacks)
- Limbo
- London Bridge
- Mingle
- Mother May I?
- Oshikura Manju
- Paper fortune teller
- Pencil fighting
- Piljke
- Pitching pennies
- Poohsticks
- Push-pin
- Red Rover
- Ring a Ring o' Roses
- Seven Up
- Simon says
- Singing games
- Skully
- Skyscope (Poland)
- Sleeping lions
- Stone skipping
- Tic-tac-toe
- Tip-cat
- Tsere tsere
- Wrestling

== See also ==
- Game
- List of open-source video games
- Outline of games
- Papers-and-Pencils games
- Street games
- Children's toys and games
- List of skill toys
