= Chor Police (disambiguation) =

Chor Police may refer to:

- Chor Police, a 1983 Indian film
- Chor Police (game), a pastime role-playing game
- Chorr Police, an Indian animation comedy show
- Chor Sipahee, 1977 Indian film
