= Sleeping Lion =

Sleeping Lion may refer to:

- Sleeping lions, a children's game
- Sleeping Lion, Bytom, a sculpture in Bytom, Poland
- Sleeping Lion, Gliwice, a sculpture in Gliwice, Poland
- The Sleeping Lion, 1919 film
