= Höga berg och djupa dalar =

Swedish folksong

Höga berg och djupa dalar is a traditional Swedish folk song (folkvisa) used when dancing around the midsummer pole and the Christmas tree.

== Publication ==
- Julens önskesångbok, 1997, under the lines "Tjugondag Knut dansar julen ut", credited as "folk game"

== Recordings ==
An early recording was done in February 1901, but never released commercial.
