= Coconut-shell walking =

Children's game

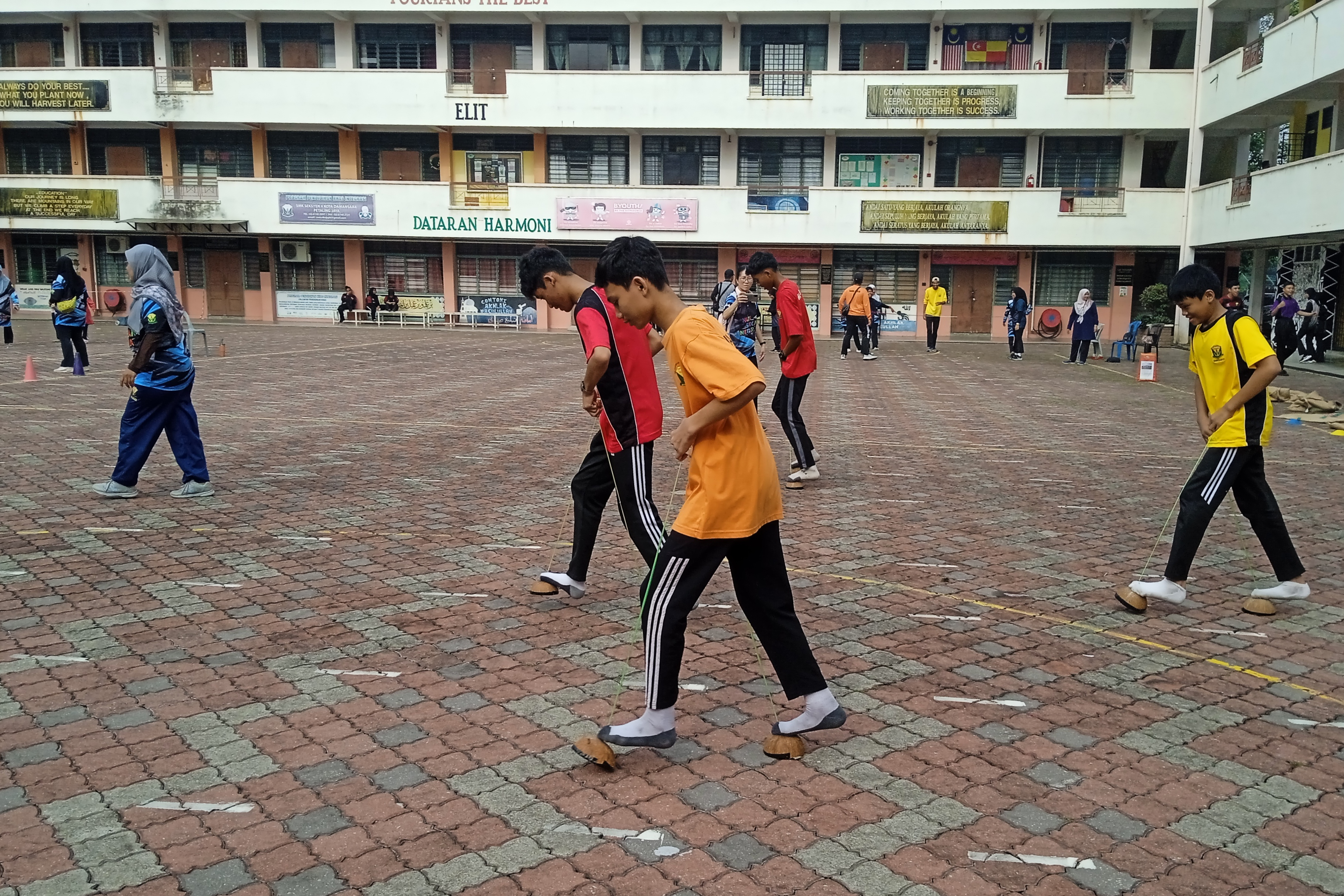
Coconut-shell walking

Coconut-shell walking is a folk children's game found among countries of Southeast Asia as well as the Pacific islands. Sometimes described as stilt walking using coconut shells, it is played using two halved coconut shells to which a rope is attached. The player walks on the shells, keeping the rope between the first two toes, while pulling on the rope to keep balance and hold the shells against the feet.
