= Loup y es-tu? =

French children's song

"Loup y es-tu?" (in French: Promenons nous dans les bois) is a popular French children's song, from at least the XIX century. It sings about how a group enters a forest where no wolf is to be seen and "as long as he isn't there, he won't eat us". During the refrain the wolf is called, but each time he is busy putting on one of his clothes. Near the end he finally arrives, which is the sign for the children to run away.

There is an equivalent English version from the same period, and similar games exist in Romania and Greece.

== Lyrics ==
(Chorus:)
Promenons-nous dans les bois,
Pendant que le loup n'y est pas.
Si le loup y était
Il nous mangerait,
Mais comme il y est pas,
Il nous mangera pas.
Loup, y es-tu ? Que fais-tu ? M'entends-tu ?

Le loup: "Je mets ma chemise "
(repeat chorus)
Le loup: "Je mets ma culotte "
(repeat chorus)
Le loup: "Je mets mes chaussettes "
(repeat chorus)
Le loup: "Je mets ma veste "
(repeat chorus)
Le loup: "Je mets mes bottes "
(repeat chorus)
Le loup: "Je mets mon chapeau "
(repeat chorus)
Ajouter les vêtements souhaités par l'enfant
(repeat chorus)
Le loup: "Je prends mon fusil ! J'arrive ! Me voilà ! "

Sauvons nous !

== See also ==
- Deep in the Woods (French: Promenons-nous dans les bois), a French horror movie (2000)
- What's the time Mr Wolf, a children's game
