= Butler Institute of American Art =

Museum in Youngstown, Ohio, US

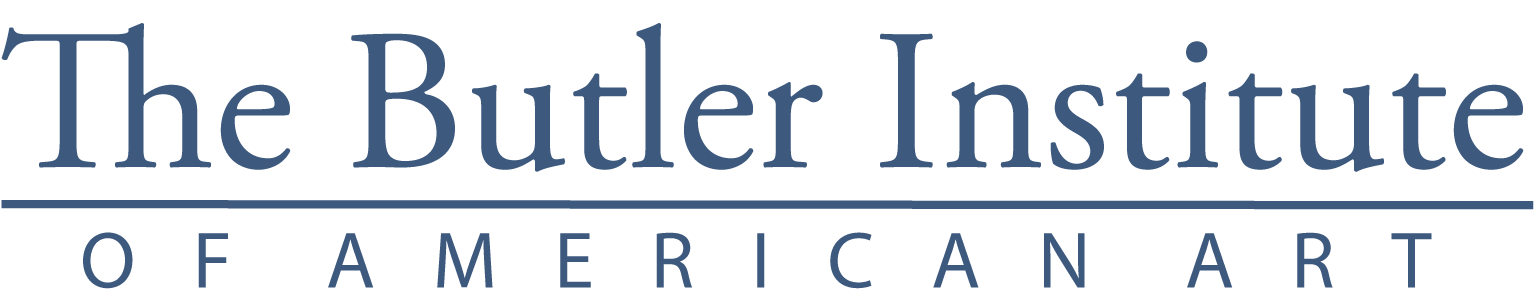

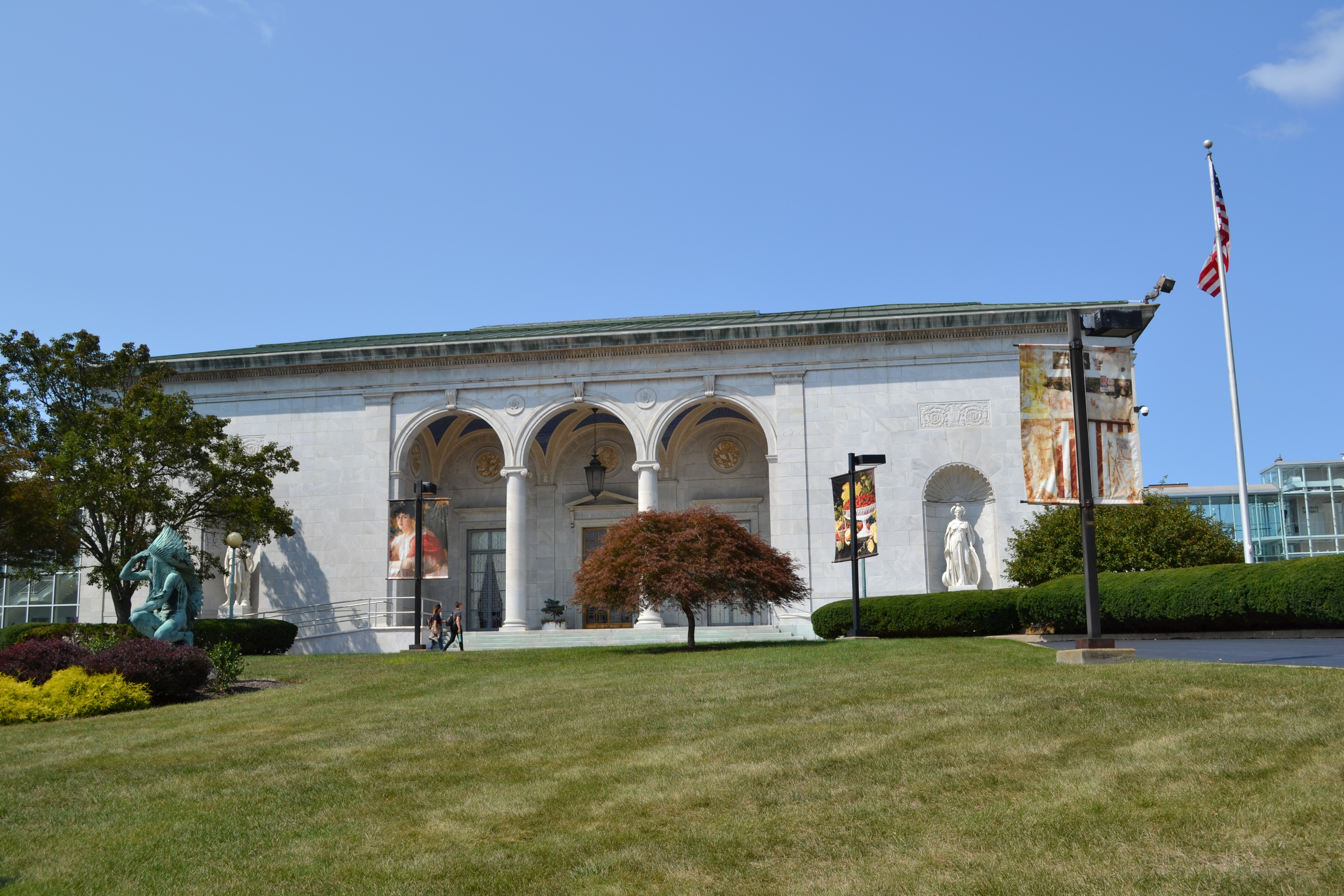
- Established: 1919
- Location: 524 Wick Avenue, Youngstown, Ohio, 44502
- Coordinates: 41.105371°N 80.645458°W
- Type: American art
- Director: Anastasia James
- Website: www.butlerart.com
- Butler Institute Of American Art
- U.S. National Register of Historic Places
- Location within Ohio Location within the United States
- Location: 524 Wick Ave., Youngstown, Ohio
- Coordinates: 41°6′20″N 80°38′46″W
- Area: less than one acre
- Built: 1919
- Architect: McKim, Mead & White
- Architectural style: Second Renaissance Revival
- NRHP reference No.: 74001567
- Added to NRHP: October 29, 1974

The Butler Institute of American Art (BIAA), located on Wick Avenue in Youngstown, Ohio, United States, was the first museum dedicated exclusively to American art. Established by local industrialist and philanthropist Joseph G. Butler, Jr., the museum has been operating pro bono since 1919. Dedicated in 1919, the original structure is a McKim, Mead and White work listed on the National Register of Historic Places.

Among the most celebrated works in the Butler's permanent collection is Winslow Homer's Snap the Whip, a famed tribute to the era of the one-room schoolhouse. Winslow, however, painted two versions of Snap the Whip, with the other version residing in the Metropolitan Museum of Art. The two paintings differ, with the Butler's version of Snap the Whip having mountains in the background, while the Metropolitan's does not. In 2007, the museum acquired the Norman Rockwell painting Lincoln the Railsplitter for $1.6 million. The previous owner of the 84.5 by 44.5 inch painting was businessman and former presidential candidate Ross Perot. Other aspects of the nation's past are captured in a unique collection of paintings featuring southwestern Native Americans, which were once part of Joseph Butler's personal collection.

Additional highlights include an iconic depiction of George Washington's wedding, William Gropper's celebrated Youngstown Strike, an interpretation of the area's violent 1937 Little Steel Strike, and Albert Bierstadt's The Oregon Trail, 1869.

Meanwhile, the gallery of modern art features a striking, life-sized painting by Alfred Leslie titled, Americans: Youngstown, Ohio, which depicts personalities connected with the Butler as they appeared in the 1970s. The museum also holds a significant collection of works by the Abstract Expressionist painter Robert Motherwell.

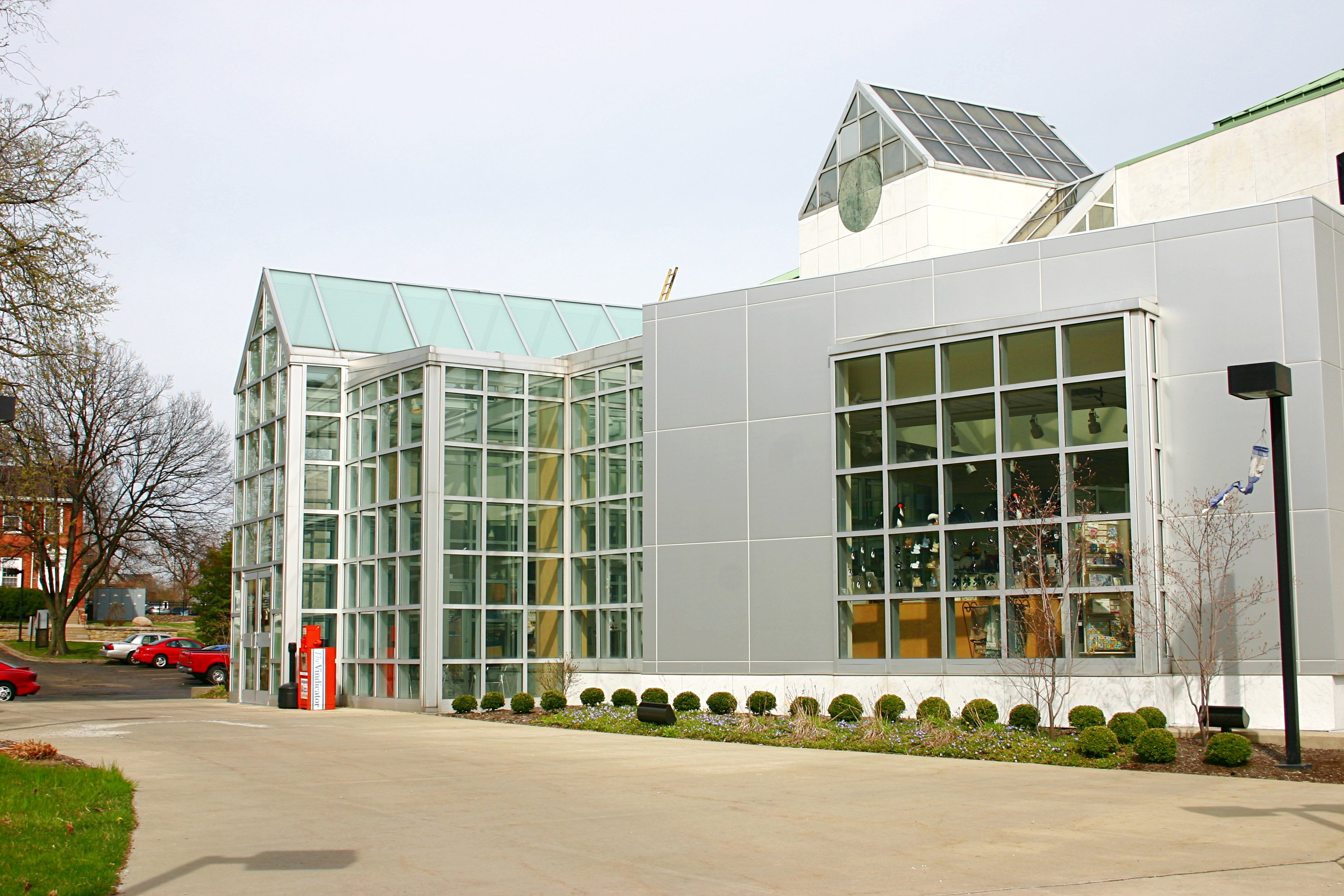
Butler Institute of American Art's Andrews Pavilion

In recent years, the Butler has expanded significantly. A 19,000-square-foot (1,800 m^{2}) south wing, the Beecher Center, was constructed in conjunction with Youngstown State University in 2000 with a focus of uniting technology and art. Two years later, the 3,400-square-foot (320 m^{2}) Andrews Pavilion, featuring a sculpture atrium, gift shop, and café, was added to the rear of the facility. In 2006, the Butler purchased the neighboring First Christian Church facility and converted it into an education and performing arts center. In October 2007, the museum had its first auction in fifteen years. Pieces of art were donated from around the country and up to 125 art enthusiasts and museum supporters gathered to view and buy the pieces of art. All of the money raised from the auction went to the hiring of scholars to produce an updated catalog of all the pieces of art in the museum and its cost of publication. In October 2009, the work of Hyperrealist painter Denis Peterson was featured in a traveling show of prominent Photorealists.

Alongside the many physical renovations to the building, the Butler Institute of American Art has also been advancing in technology as well. In December 2021, the museum partnered with the Aira Tech Corp. to gain access to an app (Aira) to assist visually impaired patrons to experience the artwork displayed. The app is user friendly and easy to use; simply open the app, tap the button, and you are partnered with an Aira agent to help describe each piece of artwork.
