= House (game) =

Children's game in which players take on the roles of a family

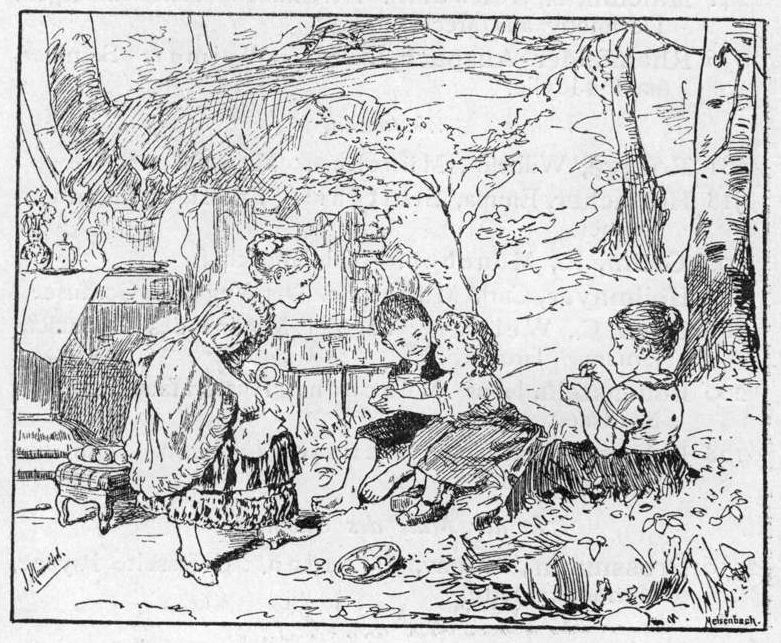
An 1883 German illustration of children playing house

House, also referred to as "playing house" or "play grown up", is a traditional children's game. It is a form of make-believe where players take on the roles of a nuclear family. Common roles include parents, children, a newborn, and pets.

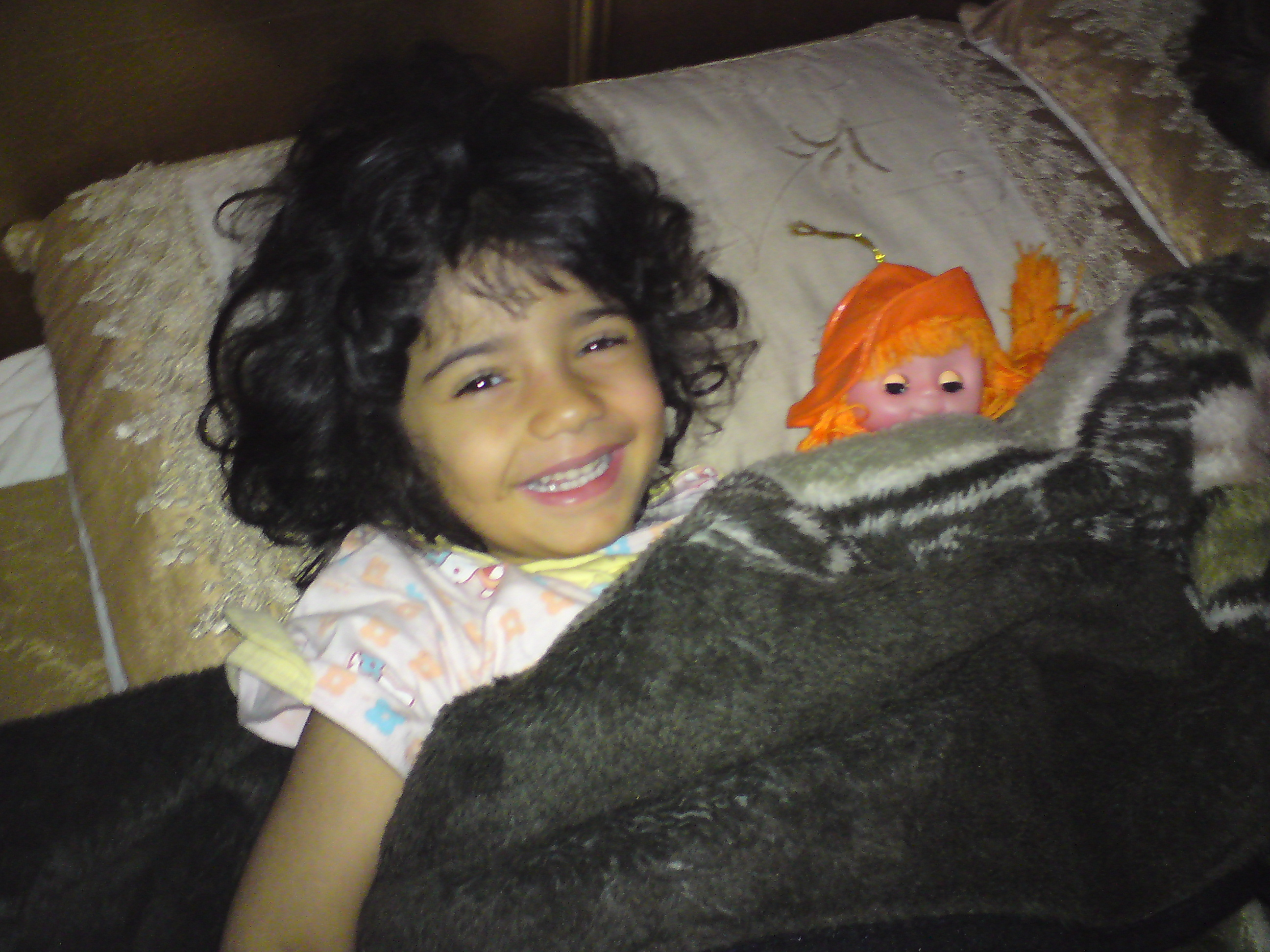
Iranian "Mamy" game with a little girl playing the mother and a little doll in the role of her daughter

The game often involves props, such as toy food or mock-up kitchen appliances. Additionally, dolls or other forms of toys can play the role of family members. Model houses and play kitchens are toys which are often specifically intended for playing house. The game is played both at home and in kindergarten or day care.

== In other cultures ==
- In Chinese, the game is called "扮家家酒" or "过家家" (playing/living a family).
- In Dutch, the game is called "vadertje en moedertje" (little father and little mother).
- In German, the game is called "Mutter, Vater, Kind" (mother, father, child).
- In Hungarian, the game is called "papás-mamás" (fatherly-motherly).
- In Italian, the game is called "mamma casetta" (mother little home).
- In Japanese, the game is called "ままごと"(playing cooking).
- In Persian, the common term (خاله بازی or مامان بازی) means "mother play" or "auntie play", highlighting that the game is stereotypically played by girls.
- In Russian, the game is called дочки-матери (daughters-and-mothers).
- In Swedish, the game is called "Mamma, pappa, barn" (mother, father, child).
- In Spanish, the game is often called "jugar a la casita/familia" (playing house/family).
- In Turkish, the game is called "Evcilik" (Houseism).
- In Hindi, the game is called "ghar-ghar" (house-house).
- In Thai, the game is called "พ่อแม่ลูก" (father, mother, child).
- In Indonesian, the game is called "Rumah-rumahan" (fake house).
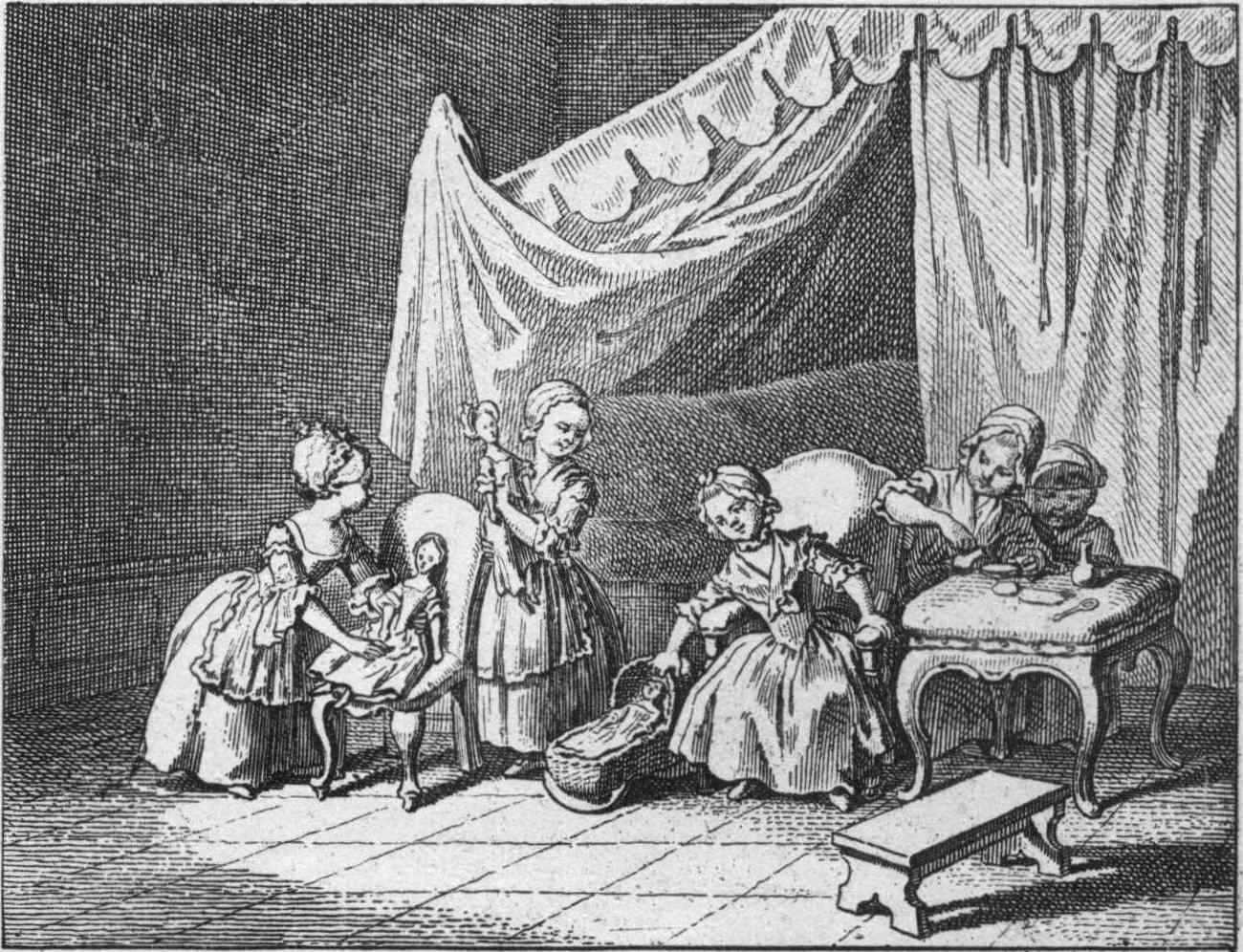

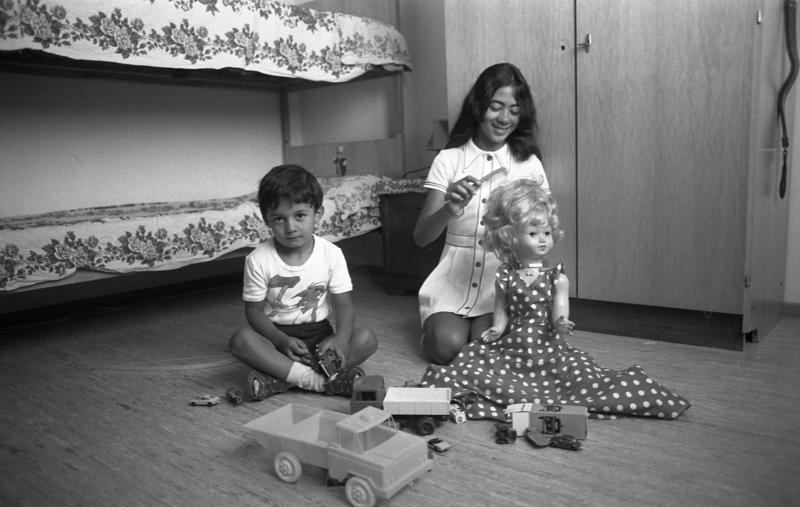

== See also ==
- Role playing
- List of children's games
- Make-believe
