= Jinx (children's game) =

Children's game

Jinx is a game, typically a schoolyard or children's game, with varying rules and penalties that occur when two people unintentionally speak the same word or phrase simultaneously. It can also be used to refer to the general phenomenon of uttering the same content at the same time.

== Rules ==
A jinx can be initiated when at least two people say any same word or phrase at the same time. Typically, after the coincidental voicing of the same content, the individuals compete to say the word "jinx" before the other, with the slower respondent being the "loser" or "jinxee".

There are different variations on what is required of the jinxee. A report in 1973 described that the loser should remain silent until they are freed by the winner. In another, the winner will say, "Jinx, buy me a soda" or "pinch poke, you owe me a Coke" first and the loser must comply. There is also a version where the name of the jinxee has to be uttered to "free" the jinxee.

== See also ==
- Pinky swear
- Punch buggy
