= Puss in the corner (children's game) =

Children's game for five players

Puss in the Corner
- Players: 5
- Setup time: 1 minute or less
- Playing time: No limit
- Chance: Low
- Age range: 3 and up
- Skills: Running

Puss in the corner is a children's game for five players.

== Description ==
A yard, court, room, or other square area with four corners, posts, or trees equidistant from one another is chosen as the playing arena. One player is nominated "Puss" and takes their place in the center of the arena. Each of the other four players selects one of the corners and takes their place there. Play begins with the four corner players attempting to exchange places with each other in any direction. "Puss" attempts to gain a corner during the exchange. Should they succeed, the player left without a corner becomes "Puss" and takes the place in the center of the arena. Play resumes in a similar manner. Should players A and B attempt to exchange corners and A gains B's corner but A's corner is gained by "Puss", then B becomes "Puss" rather than A.

== See also ==
- Four corners (game)
