= Snap the Whip =

Painting by Winslow Homer

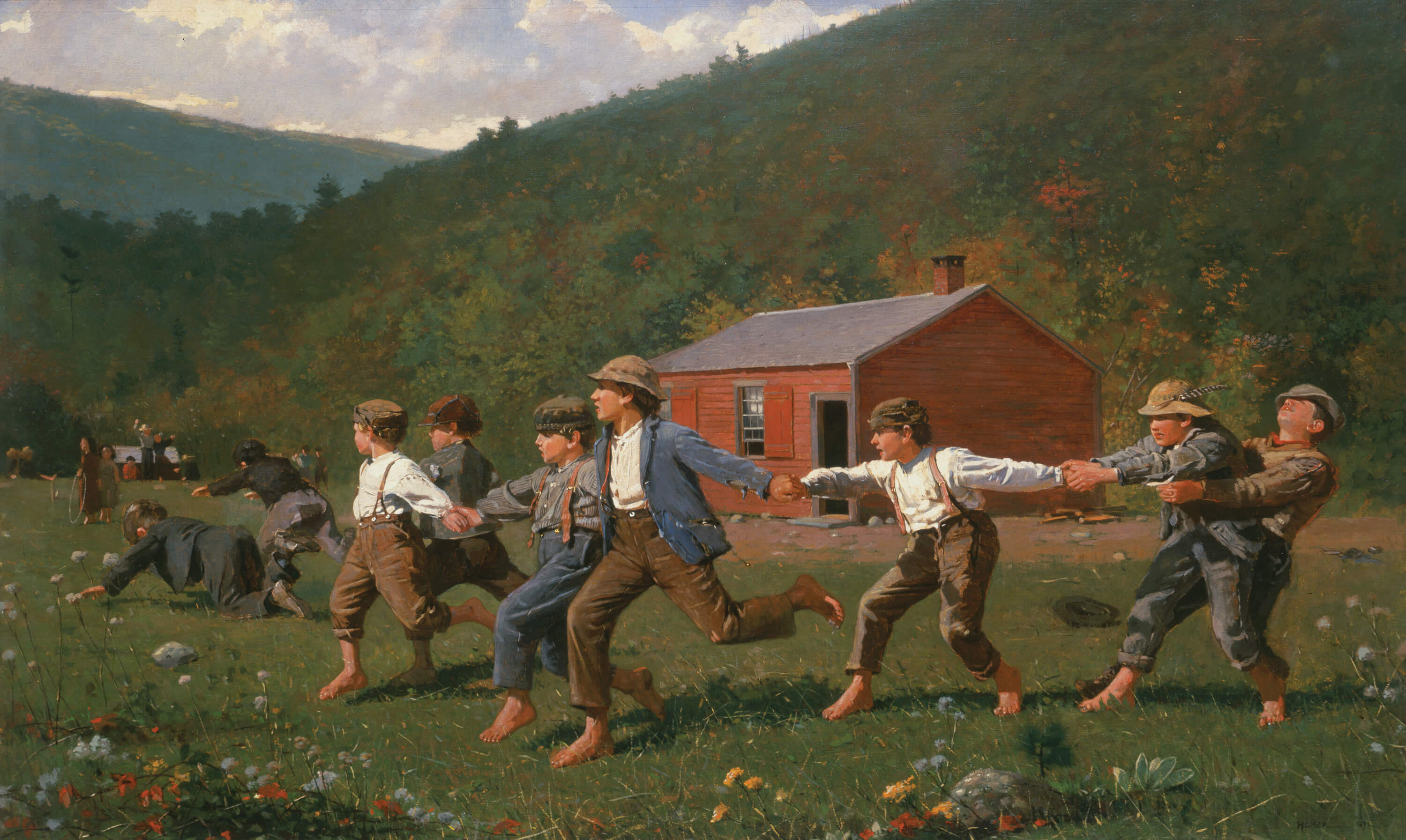
- Artist: Winslow Homer
- Year: 1872
- Medium: Oil on canvas
- Dimensions: 56 cm × 91 cm (22 in × 36 in)
- Location: Butler Institute of American Art; Youngstown, Ohio

Snap the Whip
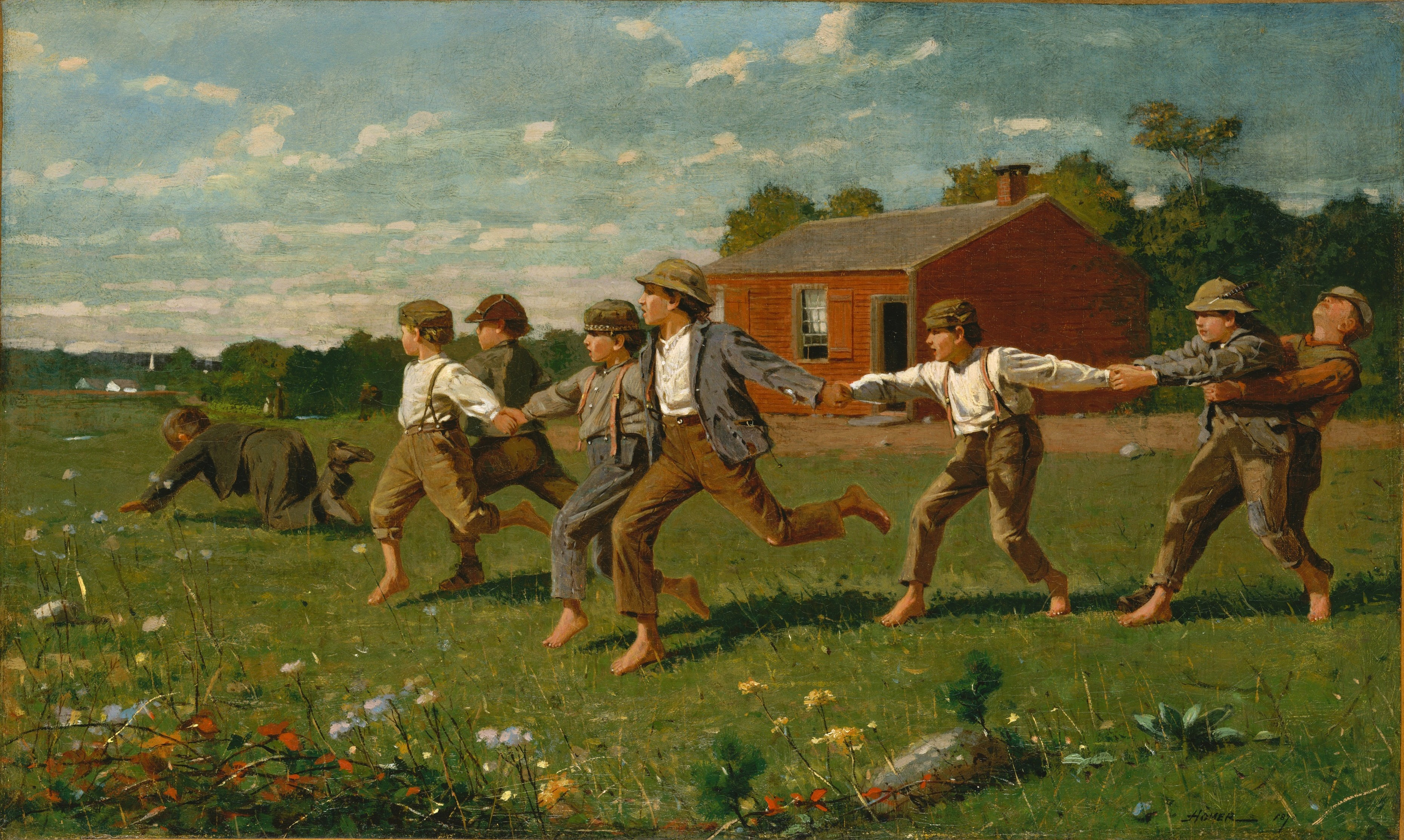
- Artist: Winslow Homer
- Year: 1872
- Medium: Oil on canvas
- Dimensions: 30 cm × 51 cm (12 in × 20 in)
- Location: Metropolitan Museum of Art; New York, New York

Snap the Whip is the name of two almost identical 1872 oil paintings by the American artist Winslow Homer. It depicts a group of children playing crack the whip in a field in front of a small red schoolhouse. With more of America's population moving to cities, the portrait depicts the simplicity of rural agrarian life that Americans were beginning to leave behind in the post-Civil War era, evoking a mood of nostalgia.

Homer spent several summers in New York's Hudson Valley, and is said to have been inspired to paint this scene by local boys playing at the Hurley schoolhouse.

The first version is in the Butler Institute of American Art in Youngstown, Ohio. Homer painted a second version, of similar date, which is now in the Metropolitan Museum of Art, New York. In this, he retains the schoolhouse but the background hillscape is removed, making the location less regionally specific.

== See also ==
- List of paintings by Winslow Homer
