= Children's toys and games =

Children's toys and games may refer to:

- Boys' toys and games
- Girls' toys and games
- Toys and games in ancient Rome

== See also ==
- List of children's games
- List of toys
