= Here Comes an Old Soldier from Botany Bay =

Children's game

Here Comes an Old Soldier from Botany Bay, commonly known as Here Comes an Old Soldier or just Old Soldier, is a nursery rhyme and children's game found in Australia, the United States, and the British Isles. The game and rhyme date to at least the late nineteenth century.

== Lyrics and performance ==
Here comes an old soldier from Botany Bay,
Have you got anything to give him to-day?

Mentions of children's games in the late 19th century describe it as a call and response game where others take turns to respond to the singer, with a prohibition of predetermined taboo words, typically yes, no, black, white, grey and sometimes other colours. The child playing the soldier may beg items of clothing and then ask what colours they are, or otherwise enter into a conversation in the hope that the child questioned will forget what has been agreed, in which case they must pay a forfeit or in some versions take on the role of the soldier.

== Origin and variations ==
G. K. Chesterton wrote of the poem as a "beggars' rhyme" during his childhood in late nineteenth-century London, and quoted the words as thus:

Here comes a poor soldier from Botany Bay:
What have you got to give him to-day?

Various other games incorporating the rhyme emerged in the twentieth century, most local adaptations that replaced the "old soldier from Botany Bay" with an "old woman from Botany Bay."

In another version of the game, the player responding must also remember and correctly name all previous items given to the old soldier, before adding a new one to the list in their response. This is similar to the game of "I packed my bag".
