= Pass the ring =

Children's game

Pass the ring is a family or children's game that needs a ring (or similar such small object). The "it" puts their hands together in a praying-like motion, with the ring between them. The remainder of the players line up beside each other with their hands in the same praying-like motion. The "it" must then walk down the line and slide their hands in between each player's hands. At some point, the "it" drops the ring or object into one of the players' hands as discreetly as possible. After walking down the line, the "it" picks a random person to guess who has the ring. A player that chooses correctly wins the game. Can also be called Grandmas Pearls where pearls are used instead
