= Poison (game) =

Traditional children's game

Poison is a traditional children's game, a variant of the game of tag. Jessie H. Bancroft's 1909 book Games for the Playground... describes it as follows.

Children form a ring clasping their hands around a much smaller "poison" circle drawn on the floor or ground. The player are trying to push or pull each other to step into the "poison". As soon as some players touch the "poison" circle, the other shouts "Poisoned!" and run for safety. The safety consists of finding a piece of dead wood, step on it. Safe children would shout "I am standing on the wood! You can't get me!" A part of fun is to try to run from one safe place to another. Players tagged while caught off the wood become poisoned themselves and join the catchers. The game ends when as many as possible become poisoned.

A simpler version, sometimes played by Scouts, is that whoever touches the "poison" drops out of the circle until only two players are left.
