= Piljke =

Piljke is a traditional game played in parts of the Balkans. The game is usually played with five small stones. One stone is thrown into the air and the objective is to pick up all other stones that lay on the ground, one by one or in group, and catch the stone that was thrown.
