= Statues (game) =

Children's game

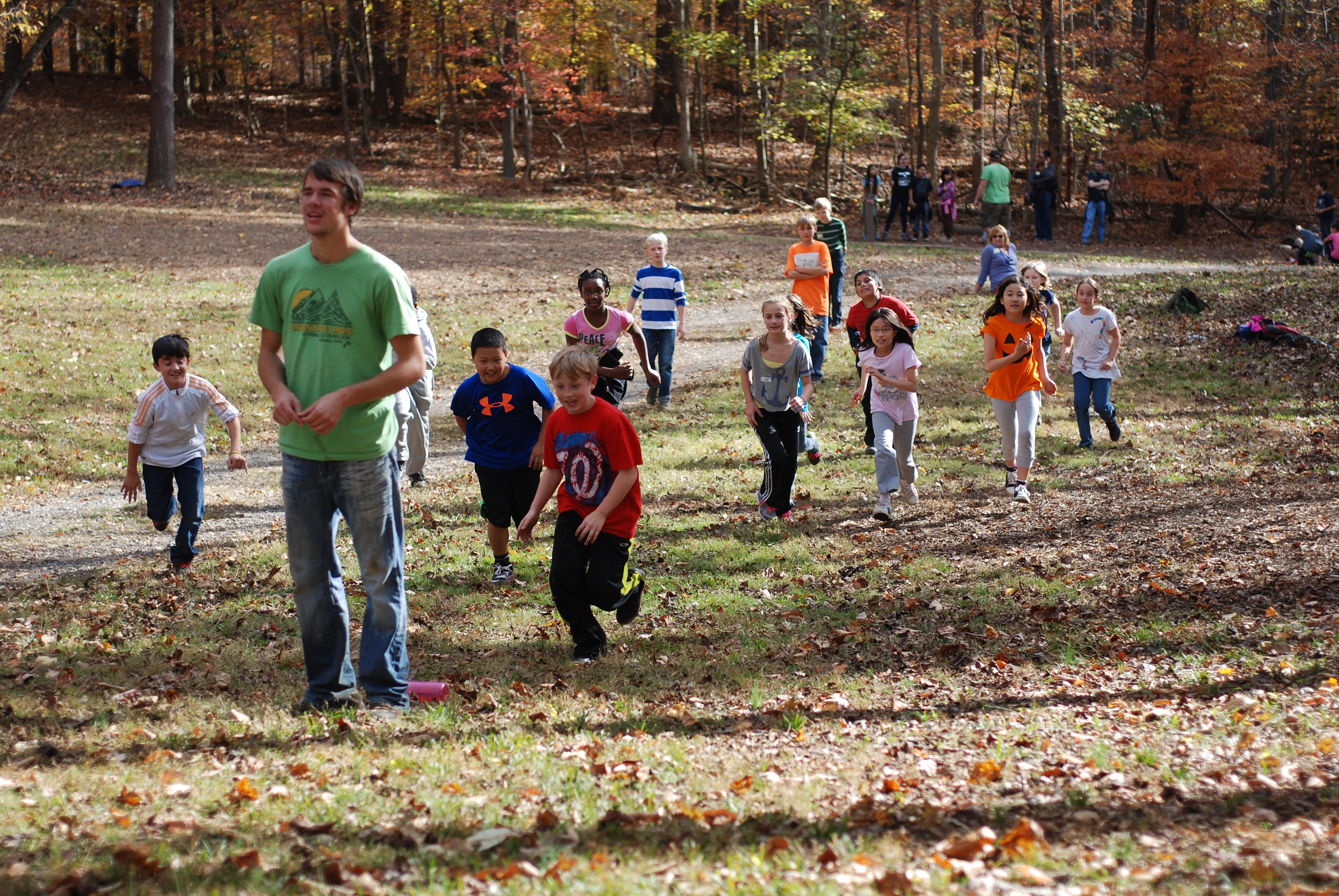
Red Light, Green Light being played at Hemlock Overlook Regional Park's Ropes course.

Statues (also known as Red Light, Green Light in North America, and Sly Fox, Grandma's/Grandmother's Footsteps or Fairy Footsteps in the United Kingdom) is a children's game. There are variations of play throughout different regions of the world.

== General rules ==
One person starts the game in the "curator" role (It, Granny, Pooh, etc.) and stands at the end of a field. Everyone else playing stands at the far end (distance depends upon playing area selected). The objective of the game is for a "statue" to tag the curator, thereby becoming the curator and resetting the game.

The curator turns their back to the field, and the "statues" attempt to race across and tag the curator.

Whenever the curator turns around, the statues must freeze in position and hold that for as long as the curator looks at them. The curator may even be allowed to walk around the statues, examining them. The curator needs to be careful – whenever the curator's back is turned, statues are allowed to move.

If a statue is caught moving they are sent back to the starting line to begin again, or, in some versions of the game, eliminated.

== Variations ==
=== Red Light, Green Light ===
Red Light, Green Light is a variation of Statues played throughout North America. The title of the game refers to the colors of a traffic light.

- Like Statues, Red Light, Green Light is played in a field or another long space.
- One player, the Caller, stands at one end of the field and calls out to the rest of the players who line up at the other end.
- The Caller turns around, looking away from the rest of the players and calls out "green light!"
- While the Caller is looking away, the other players are permitted to move, and they attempt to advance on the Caller. The objective is to get close enough to the Caller to tag them.
- At any point while the Caller is turned away, they can call "red light!" and turn back around to face the players. When this is called, the players must freeze in place. If the Caller observes any player moving, they send them back to the start.
- This repeats until another player tags the Caller.
- The caller may recite "red light!" and "green light!" as fast or slow as they would like in order to catch the other players while they are still moving.
- The first player to tag the Caller without being caught becomes the new Caller, and all other players return to the start to begin another round.

There are different levels of stringency in regard to how much movement the Caller may observe to send a player back to the start. Some allow general movement as long as the players are not moving their feet from the ground, while others restrict any large bodily movements, such as swaying of the arms or even smiling. Blinking and breathing are generally permitted.

In the Dutch version, the Caller shouts "Annemaria Koekoek!" ("Ann Maria Cuckoo!") when they turn around (like "red light!") which is slightly similar to the Dutch name of a Peekaboo game played with babies, where the parents hide their face with their hands, then reveal themselves whilst saying "Peek-a-boo!" (also known in Dutch as "Kiekeboe!").

=== Winnie the Pooh ===
Winnie the Pooh is a variation of Statues where the person playing "Pooh" (the Curator) usually leans against a wall and has to shout "1, 2, 3, Winnie the Pooh, stop!" (so it is long enough for the players to reach some distance and because of the rhyme it provides in Bulgarian, where this version comes from) before turning to face the players. Whenever a player tags Pooh they have to run so it doesn't catch them. If they manage to go back to the wall where Pooh was leaning before it catches them, they become Pooh and the game starts over. In this variation the role of Pooh is more desirable.

=== Team building exercise ===
Another variation of the game was altered as a team building exercise. It follows the Red Light, Green Light rules with exception that if anybody moves after the red light the whole team must return to the starting line. Also, the object of the game is for the players to "steal" an "object" positioned near the "it" person and return with it to the other side of the field. Once the "object" is moved it has to stay hidden from "it", who has several chances to guess who has it at the moment. If guessed successfully then the whole team must return to the starting line.

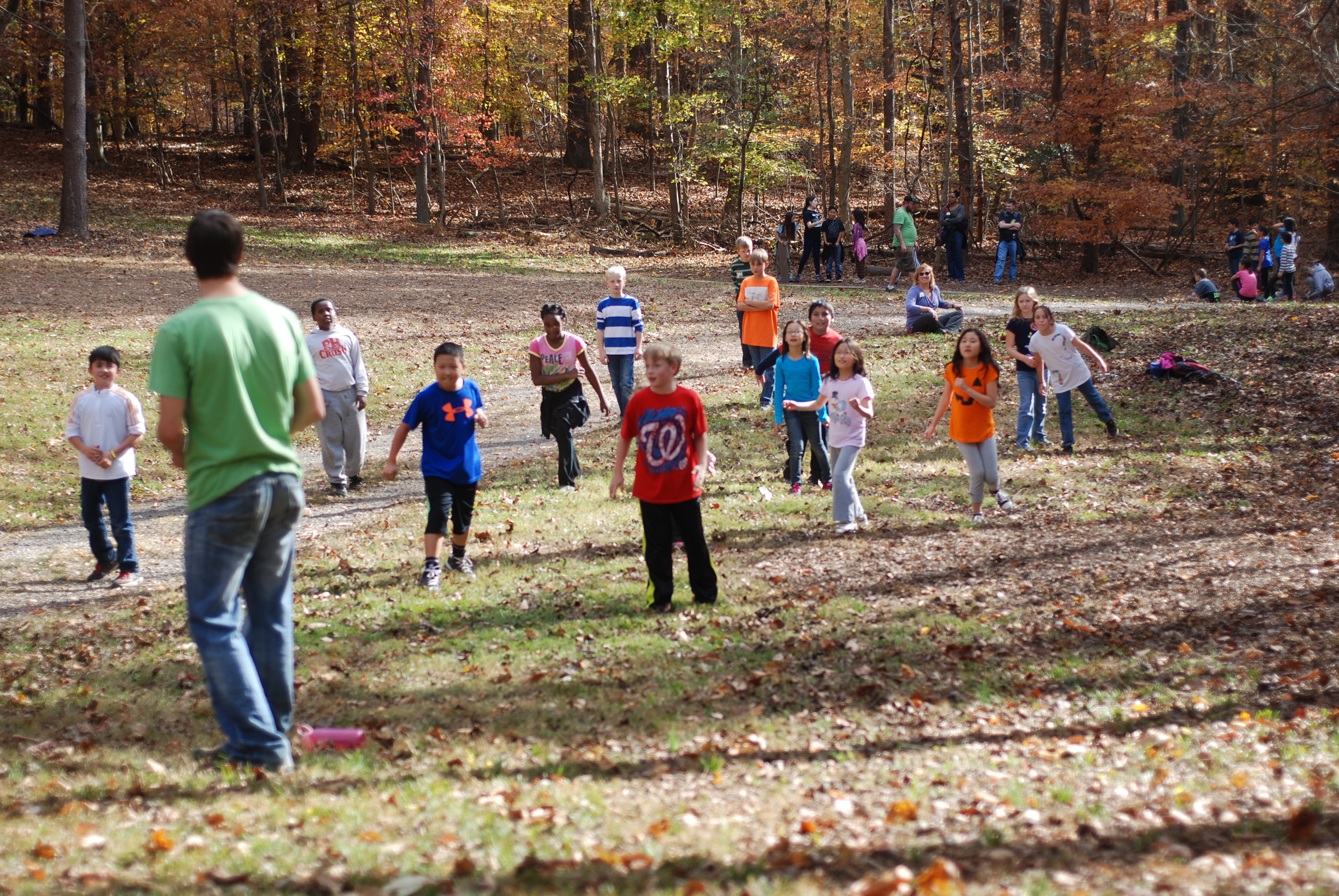
Red light

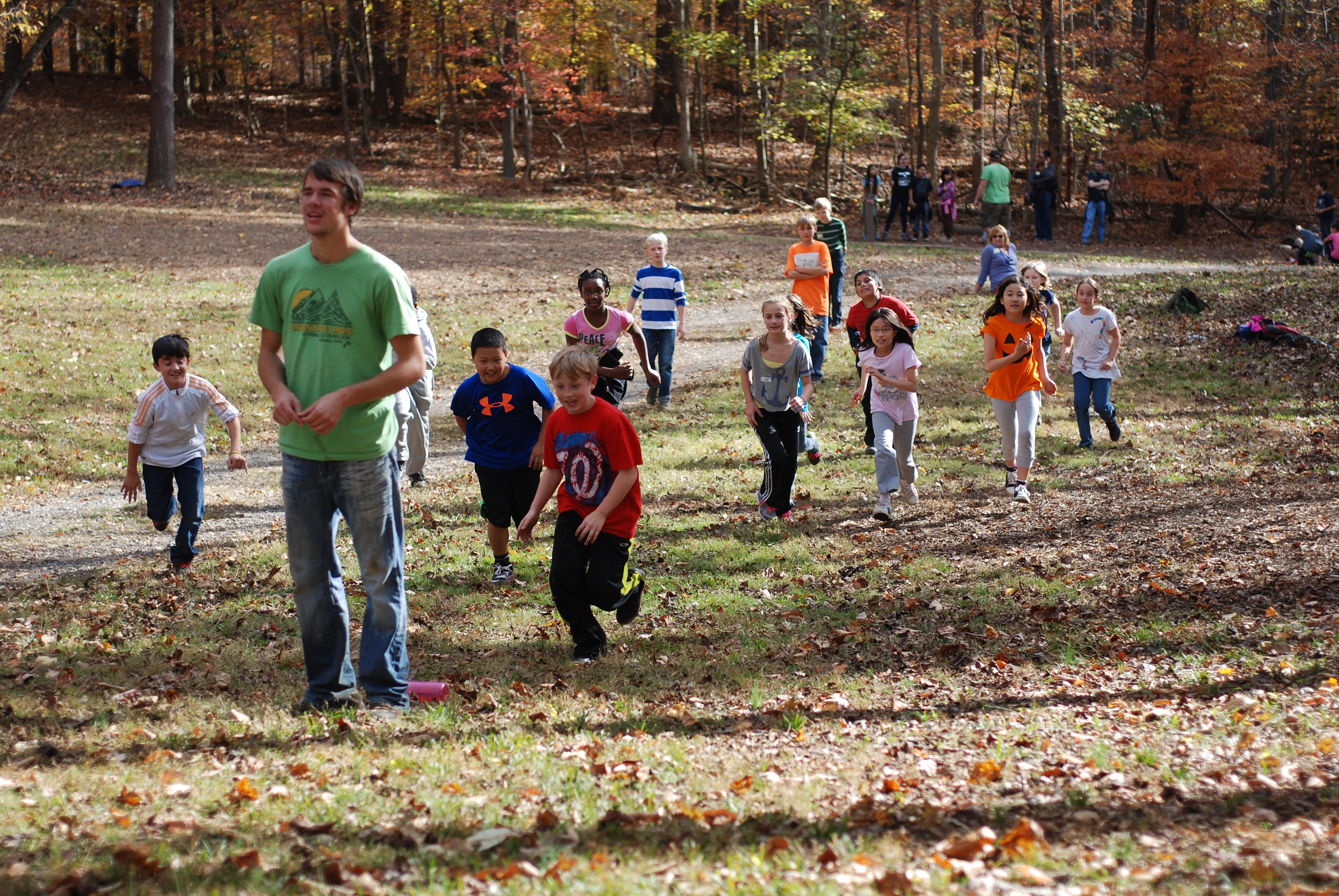
Green light

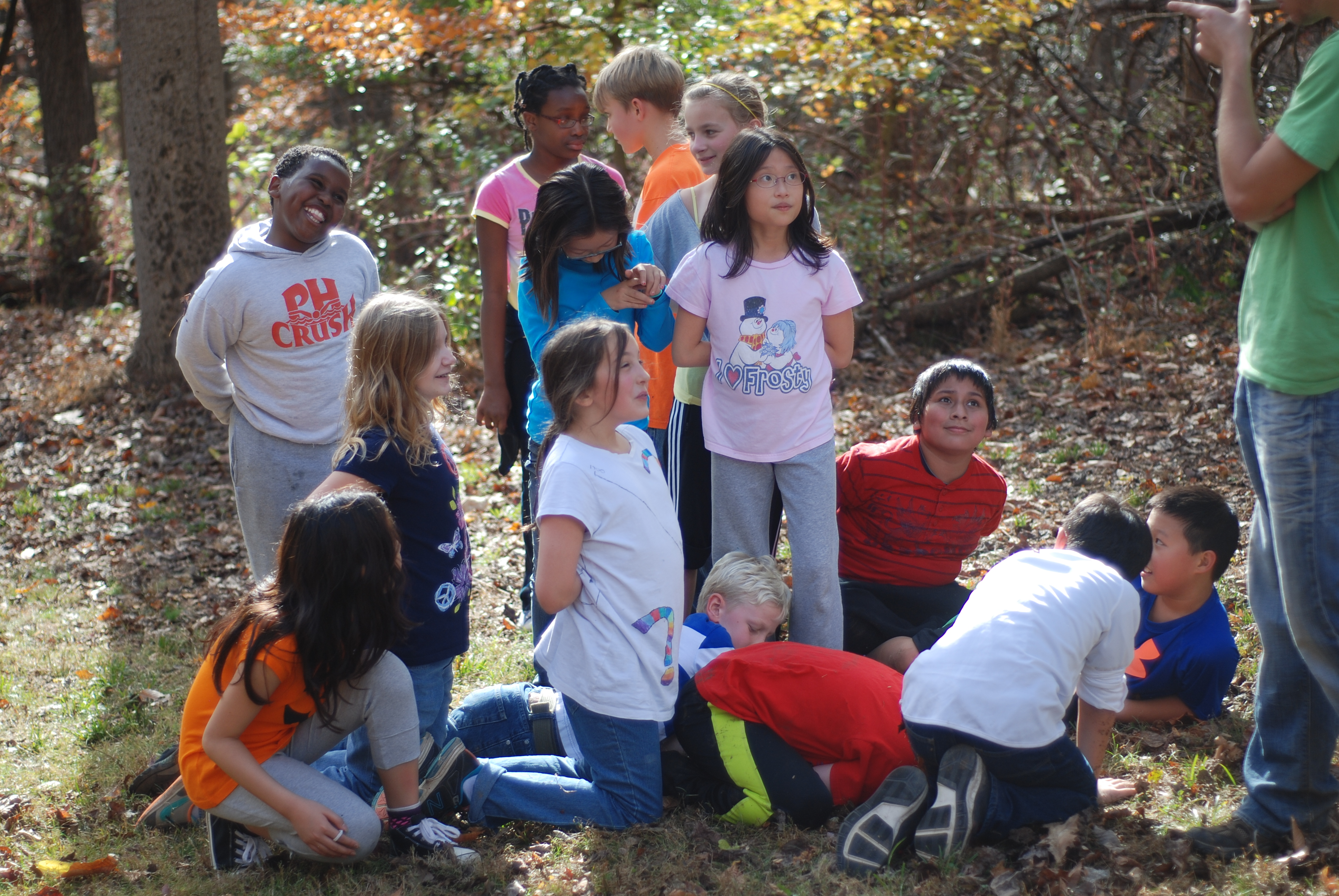
Guessing who is hiding the "object"

== Other names ==
Argentina
"Uno, dos, tres, cigarrillo cuarenta y tres" (tr. "One, two, three, cigarette forty three")
Australia
"Hot Chocolate"
"Giant Steps"
Austria
"Donner, Wetter, Blitz!" (tr. "Thunder, weather, lightning!")
"Zimmer, Küche, Kabinett, hinterm Ofen steht ein Bett!" (tr. "Room, kitchen, cabinet, behind the oven there is a bed!")
Bangladesh
"Statue!"
"এলন্ডি লন্ডন, ঘড়ি বাজে টনটন, এক, দুই, তিন!" (Ēlanḍi lanḍana, ghaṛi bājē ṭanaṭana, ēka, du'i, tina! tr. "L-O-N-D London, bells ring ton-ton, 1 2 3!")
Belgium
"Eén, twee, drie, piano!" (tr. "One, two, three, piano!") (Dutch/Flemish)
"Un, deux, trois, piano!" (tr. "One, two, three, piano!") or "Un, deux, trois, soleil!" (tr. "One, two, three, sun!") (French)
Brazil
"Batatinha frita, um, dois, três!" (tr. "Little french fry, one, two, three!")
Bulgaria
"Winnie the Pooh" (Мечо Пух; Mecho Pukh, lit. "Pooh Bear")
"Indian Eye" (Индианско Око; Indiansko Oko, lit. "Native American Eye")
Canada
"Go, go, stop!" (British Columbia)
"Un, deux trois, soleil" (tr. "One, two, three, sun") (Quebec)
"Bleu, blanc, rouge!" (tr. "Blue, white, red!") (Quebec)
"Un, deux trois, statue!" (tr. "One, two, three, statue!") (Quebec)
Chile
"Un, dos, tres, momia es" (tr. "One, two, three, it's a mummy")
China
"红灯绿灯小白灯" (Hóng dēng lǜ dēng xiǎo bái dēng. tr. "Red light, green light, little white light")
"一，二，三，我们都是木头人！" (Yī, èr, sān, wǒ mēn dōu shì mù tóu rén. tr. "One, two, three, we are all wooden men!")
Colombia
"Un, dos, tres, pollito inglés!" (tr. "One, two, three, little English chicken!")
"Uno, dos, tres, toca pared" (tr. "One, two, three, touch the wall")
Costa Rica
"Un, dos, tres, quesito, ¡stop!" (tr. "One, two, three, little cheese, stop!")
Croatia
"Crna kraljica, jedan, dva, tri" (tr. "Black Queen, one, two, three")
Cyprus
“ένα, δύο, τρία, έτοιμη η φωτογραφία!” (“one, two, three, picture’s ready!”)
Czech Republic
"Cukr, káva, limonáda... čaj, rum, bum!" (tr. "Sugar, coffee, lemonade... tea, rum, boom!") – The words rhyme, and the latter are easier to say quickly.
Denmark
"rød gul grøn stop" ("red yellow green stop")
Egypt
تماثيل إسكندرية Statues of Alexandria. One will stand in front of the wall and cover his/her face and sing "تماثيل اسكندرية، تماثيل مبتتحركش" (Tamaseel Iskenderiah, Tamaseel mabtetharaksh) (tr. "Statues of Alexandria, they are a statues that don't move") and while he/she is singing the rest is moving and when he/she stops singing they freeze like the statues.
Estonia
"Heeringas, heeringas, üks, kaks, kolm" (tr. "Herring, herring, one, two, three")
Finland
"Peili" (tr. "Mirror")
France
"Un, deux trois, soleil" (tr. "One, two, three, sun")
Germany
"Eins, zwei, drei, vier, Ochs am Berg" (tr. "One, two, three, four ox at the mountain")
“Grünes licht, rotes licht” (tr. ”Green light, red light”)
Greece
"Αγαλματάκια ακούνητα, αμίλητα, αγέλαστα... Μέρα ή νύχτα;" (Agalmatákia akoúnita, amílita, agélasta... Méra í nýchta? tr. "Statues that don't move, don't speak, don't laugh... Day or night?
Hong Kong
"一二三，紅綠燈，過馬路，要小心" (Yāt yih sāam, hùhng luhk dāng, gwo máh louh, yiu síu sām. tr. "One Two Three, Red light green light, careful when you cross the road")
Iceland
"Einn, tveir, þrír, fjórir, fimm, dimmalimm" (tr. "One, two, three, four, five, 'dimmalimm'")
India
" S-T-O-P Stop!!"
"Statue!"
"Apple, Apple, Banana"
Indonesia
"Patung" (tr. "Statue")
Ireland
"Sly Fox"
Israel
"Dag Maluah" (דג מלוח, lit. "Salted fish", tr. Pickled herring; "Ahat shtayim shalosh [one two three] dag maluah!")

Italy
"Un, due, tre, stella!" (tr. "One, two, three, star!")
Japan
"Daruma-san ga koronda" (達磨さんが転んだ; lit. "The Daruma Fell Over") Instead of calling out the phrase, "Daruma-san ga koronda", you may count down from 10 to 1.
Korea
"Mugunghwa kkochi pieotseumnida" (무궁화 꽃이 피었습니다/無窮花 꽃이 피었습니다, lit. "The Rose of Sharon has bloomed")
Latvia
"Lēnāk iesi, tālāk tiksi!" (tr. "The slower you go, the further you'll get!")
"Lēnāk brauksi, tālāk tiksi!" (tr. "The slower you drive, the further you'll get!")
Mexico
"Un, dos, tres, calabaza" (tr. "One, two, three, pumpkin")
Nepal
"L-O-N-D-O-N London, S-T-O-P Stop!!" or just "L-O-N-D-O-N London!"
Netherlands
"Annemaria Koekoek!"
New Zealand
"Sneak up Granny"
Norway
"En, to, tre, Rødt lys!" (tr. "One, two, three, Red light!")
Pakistan
"P-O-L-O S-T-O-P stop, Polo Stop!"
"L-O-N-D-O-N London Stop!"
Panama
"Un, dos, tres, pan con queso!" (tr. "One, two, three, grilled cheese!")
Philippines
"Pepsi, 7-Up!"
Poland
"Raz, dwa, trzy, Baba Jaga patrzy!" (tr. "One, two, three, Baba Yaga is looking!")
Portugal
"Um, dois, três, macaquinho do chinês!" (tr. "One, two, three, little monkey of the Chinese!")
Romania
"Unu, doi, trei, la perete stai" (tr. "One, two, three, you're staying at the wall")
Russia
"Море волнуется — раз!" (More volnuyetsya — raz! lit. "Sea has waves — one!")
"Тише едешь — дальше будешь!" (Tishe yedesh' — dal'she budesh'! lit. "The quieter you go, the further you'll get!")
Serbia
"Лукава лисица, СТОП!" (Lukava lisica, STOP! tr. "Sneaky fox, stop!")
Singapore
"A, E, I, O, U"
Slovenia
"Mati, koliko je ura?" (tr. "Mother, what time is it?")
"Ljubljana – Zagreb – Beograd. Stop!"
Spain
"Uno, dos, tres, toca la pared" (tr. "One, two, three, touch the wall")
"Un, dos, tres, el escondite inglés" (tr. "One, two, three, English hide and seek")
"Un, dos, tres, pollito inglés!" (tr. "One, two, three, little English chicken!")
"Pica paret" or "Un, dos, tres, pica paret" (tr. "Knock the wall" or "One, two, three, knock the wall") (Catalonia)
Sweden
"Ett, Två, Tre, Ost!" (tr. "One, two, three, cheese!")
"Ett, Två, Tre, Rött Ljus!" (tr. "One, Two, Three, Red Light!")
"Röda, vita rosen, stopp!" (tr. "The red, the white rose, stop!)"
"Ett, två, tre, röda lyktan stopp!" (tr. "One, two, three, red lantern stop!")
Switzerland
"Ziitig läse" (tr. "Reading the Newspaper") (German side)
"Un, deux, trois, soleil" (tr. "One, two, three, sun") (French side)
"Un, due, tre, stella!" (tr. "One, two, three, star!") (Italian side)
Taiwan
"Yī, èr, sān, mù tou rén" (一, 二, 三, 木頭人, lit. "One, two, three, wooden man")
Thailand
"A E I O U"
Turkey
"Davul, Zurna, Bir, İki, Üç" (tr. "Davul, Zurna, one, two, three")
United Kingdom
"Hot chocolate"
"Granny's Footsteps"
"White Horses” (Scotland)
United States
"Un, dos, tres, pescao" (tr. "One, two, three, fish") (Puerto Rico)
"One Fish, Two Fish, Red Fish, Blue Fish"
Venezuela
"Un, dos, tres, pollito inglés!" (tr. "One, two, three, little English chicken!")
Vietnam
"Em bé tập đi" (lit. "The baby learns to walk")
"Ngựa Gỗ" (tr. "Wooden Horse")
"Một, Hai, Ba" (tr. "One two three")
"Hổ đã quay lại làng" (lit. "A tiger has returned to our village")

== In popular culture ==
- Doctor Who writer Russell T Davies said that the statue role in Grandmother's Footsteps was a concept for the Weeping Angel, a recurring monster on the 2005–present show.
- In The Railway Series story Percy and the Trousers, Percy tries to play Grandmother's Footsteps with the coaches, but instead hits a trolley of trousers.
- Folk music trio Peter, Paul and Mary adapted this game into a song called "Rocky Road" on their 1963 album, In the Wind.
- Hajime Syacho, the most popular YouTuber in Japan and participants, 740 in all, played Daruma-san ga koronda at Industrial Development Center in Kanazawa-ku, Yokohama, Kanagawa Prefecture on 24 October 2015 which has been listed in the Guinness World Records.
- In the 1942 Merrie Melodies short The Case of the Missing Hare, Bugs plays a statues game on the magician while Ala Bahma charges at Bugs to kill him.
- In the 1987 film RoboCop, the titular character is seen playing the game with elementary school children in footage shown during an in-film news report.
- In the Japanese manga As the Gods Will and its 2014 film adaptation, it is one of the games the students are forced to play with a Daruma doll.
- The third chapter of the 2017 game Faith: The Unholy Trinity features this game as a method to obtain the key to progress. The player must collect the key and return without being caught by the cultist and the gray demon. Failing to comply will result in death.
- In the 2021 dystopian Netflix series Squid Game, it was the first game of the competition. Contestants played the game with a large doll resembling Young-hee, a young girl from a Korean book series. The game played was a deadlier iteration, where anyone caught moving would be shot dead.
- Crab Game, a 2021 game based on the Netflix series Squid Game, features the game as portrayed in the show—only in this version, players explode rather than being shot when they lose.
- In the 2022 game Poppy Playtime: Chapter 2 – Fly in a Web, there is a section somewhat similar to this game where the player must navigate through an obstacle course while being chased by a large caterpillar toy. When a light comes on, they must stand still and cannot move until it goes off again.

== See also ==
- What's the time, Mr Wolf?
