= Tsere tsere =

South African children's game

Tsere tsere is a children's game from South Africa. It is no longer frequently played.

In Bantu tsere-tsere means 'walking deliberately'.
