= Crack the whip =

Children's game

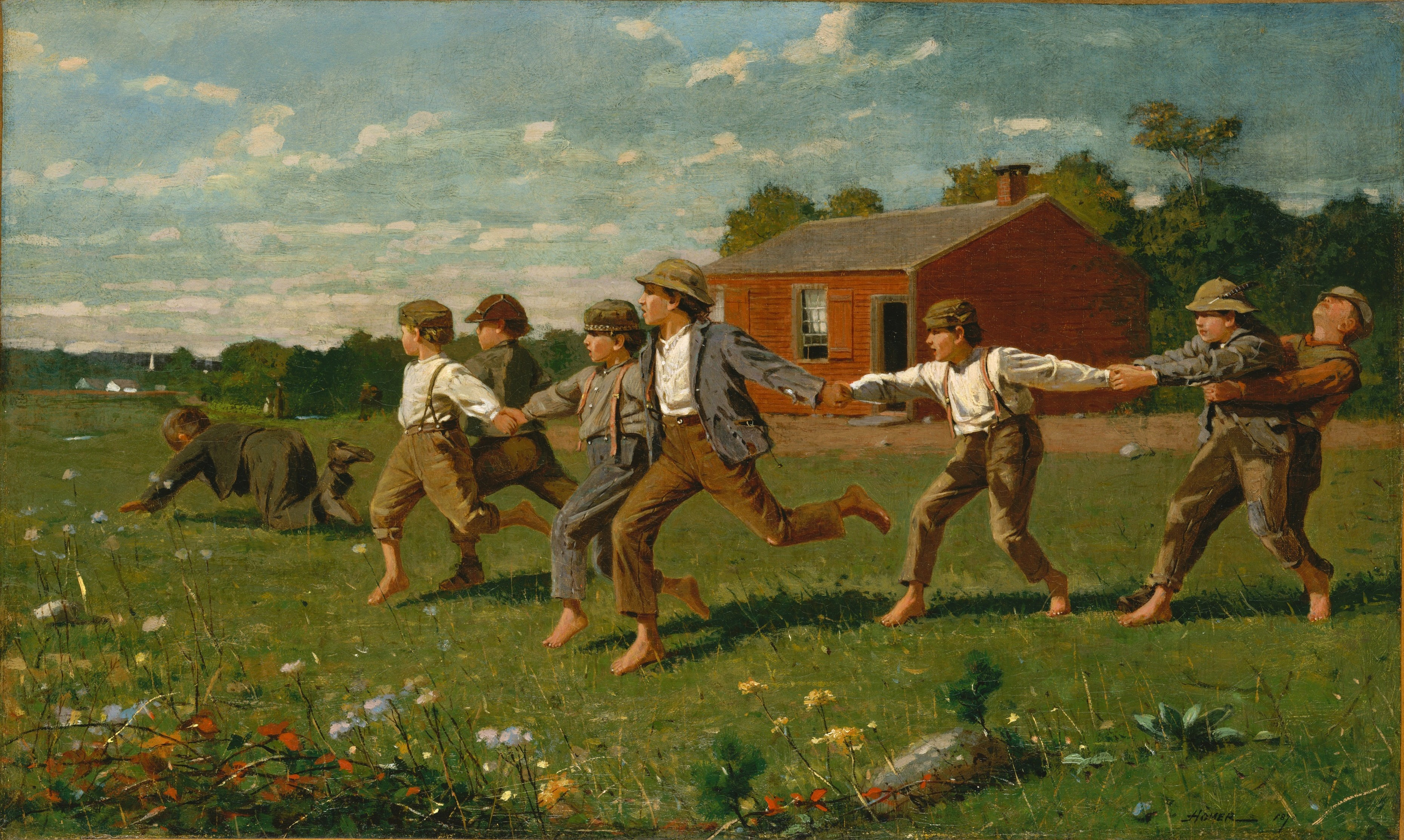
American boys playing the game in Winslow Homer's 1872 painting Snap the Whip

Crack the whip (also known as Pop the Whip or Snap the Whip) is at its simplest an outdoor children's game, usually played in small groups, on grass and sometimes ice. One player, chosen as the "head" of the whip, runs (or skates) around in random directions, with subsequent participants holding on to the hand of that ahead of them (or hips when skating) and seeking to hang on. With every turn the forces generated accelerate the tail, the sharper the turn and longer the tail the more so, eventually "cracking the whip" and sending one or more players flying.

Unlike musical chairs the game is not won by the last to hold on. Instead, those shucked along the way are welcome to rejoin the game so long as they can hang on, with competition among them to resume as close to the current tail as they can, to minimize the likelihood of being thrown off again at its end.

There is no objective to the game, which was illustrated in Winslow Homer's 1872 painting of boys joyously plunged in Snap the Whip, other than having fun and enjoying its physical thrills. It experienced a distinct wave of popularity in the 1930s and 1940s in the United States at public skating rinks, and was often featured in Hollywood movies of that time.
