= Spud (game) =

Ball tag game

Spud is a dodgeball variant for children and adults, where players try to eliminate each other by catching and throwing an inflated and generally soft ball. It is related to "call ball" and "ball tag".

As few as three may play, with no upper limit. A large, open area is required. The game begins with each player being assigned a number, in secret, with the highest number corresponding to the number of players. For example, if 5 people are playing, each player will be assigned one of the numbers 1 through 5. A player is chosen as 'It.' The person who is It stands in the approximate center of the playing area, with one foot in front of the other. All of the other players must then touch one of their feet to its inward foot, and then step backwards 3 paces. This 3-step-backward set-up is required. When all of the players have stepped backward 3 paces, the person who is It throws the ball straight into the air and calls the number of another player. The ball must be thrown straight up.

When the ball is thrown skyward, all of the players then dash away until the player whose number is called both (1) gains possession of the ball; and (2) calls out 'Spud!' At that point, all of the players must freeze. If, while they were running, they were unable to stop immediately, those players must retrace their steps and return to the point that they were in contact with when Spud! was called. In no event may any of the players run around corners or hide behind trees. In all instances, they must be in sight of the player who has gained possession of the ball. At this point, the player who has the ball is allowed to take an identified number of giant steps toward one or more of the other players. Smaller, younger, or older players may be given the option of taking more steps. After the steps are taken, the person with the ball will try to hit one of the other players with the ball. The target player may not move his or her feet or duck, but may sway, bend, shimmy, and shift.

Targeted players who come into contact with the thrown ball in any way (unless the ball is caught), are penalized with one letter (i.e., S P U or D), and then is charged with throwing the ball into the air for the next round. If the target player does not come into contact with the thrown ball or the target player catches the ball, the player who threw the ball is penalized with one letter, and then is charged with throwing the ball into the air for the next round.

When a player receives four penalty letters (S P U D), that person is required to be eliminated, or a new game is begun. For another variation, a player who receives four Penalty letters is simply removed from the game, and the other players continue playing with their original penalty letters in place. When there are only 2 players left playing under this variation, there are two ways for the game to end. First, both players can be declared victors. Second, one of the removed players throws the ball into the air for the final round.

In another variation, the highest of the secretly-assigned numbers is 2 greater than the number of players. In this version, the 2 secretly unassigned numbers are referred to as 'ghost numbers.' If the player throwing the ball into the air calls a ghost number, all players will then chase after the ball and try to touch it. The last player to touch the ball is penalized with one letter and is then charged with throwing the ball into the air for the next round. While kicking the ball is permitted, players may not kick the ball if it is within 3 feet of another player (for purposes of safety). In this instance, the player may simply touch or punch the ball with another part of the body besides his or her feet. In this version, when a player is removed, his or her number also becomes a ghost number. In all instances, a player who wants to call a ghost number must throw the ball sufficiently high and in the air to remove any advantage that they would otherwise have.
