= Silent ball =

Party game

Silent ball is a party game, commonly played in a classroom, in which a ball is thrown from player to player while everyone attempts to remain silent. The game was created to stimulate interpersonal relationships by the Psi Chi honor society. Silent ball stems from experiments by Philip G. Zimbardo.

There may be variations or additions to the standard ruleset. For example, if players who are sitting down, because they are "out", are able to catch the ball, then they may re-enter the game. If the ball is tossed inaccurately or in an aggressive manner, then the person who threw the ball is "out". Other adaptations include disallowing players from returning the ball to the players from whom they have immediately received it (except in cases where only two players remain in the game), imposing time limits on how long players may hold the ball before being required to pass it, or the teacher of the class joining in.

Silent ball also goes by the names "Silent desk ball" or "Mum ball".

In a classroom game of silent ball, the students are usually the players, whereas the teacher is usually a referee, though occasionally the teacher may join in as a player.

Some common strategies include "snake eyes" in which someone looks at one player and throws it at another player. Though this is sometimes a banned strategy, there is also "whipping" the ball in which a player throws the ball as hard as possible. In some instances, two players will sit at the same desk and be a team, although this is an uncommon practice.
