= Sleeping lions =

Children's game

Sleeping lions is a children's game.

== Rules ==
All but one or two players are "lions", and lie down on the floor, eyes closed, as if they were sleeping. The remaining one or two players ("hunters") move about the room attempting to encourage the lions to move. The hunters cannot touch the lions, but may move close to them, tell things to them, jokes, etc. Any person who moves must stand up and join the hunters.

== Usage ==
Sleeping lions is also sometimes used in schools as an exercise. All the children will play "lions" and the teacher will play the "hunter". Usually, in this case, the teacher will make no effort to make the "lions" move, because in this case the real aim of the "game" is to calm the children down after playing other exciting games.

Other names for the game include: dead soldiers.
