= Skyscope =

Children's game

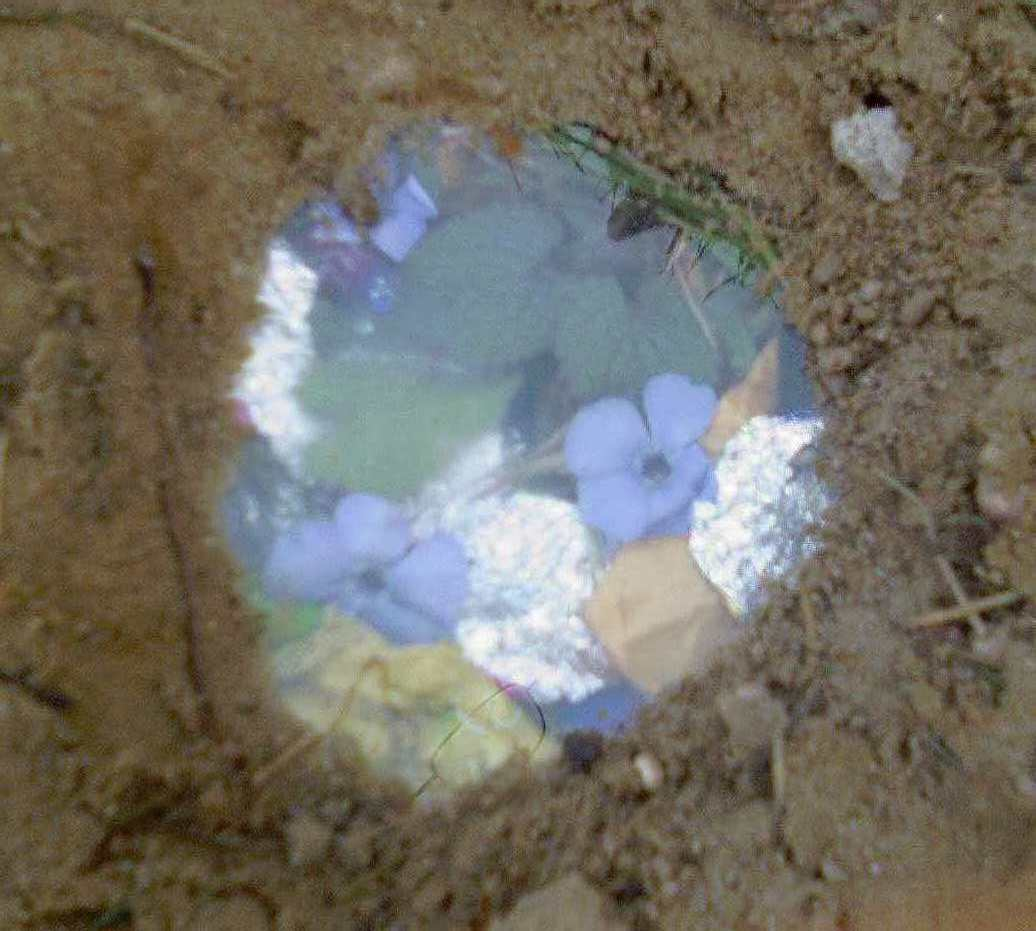
Skyscope (seen from above)

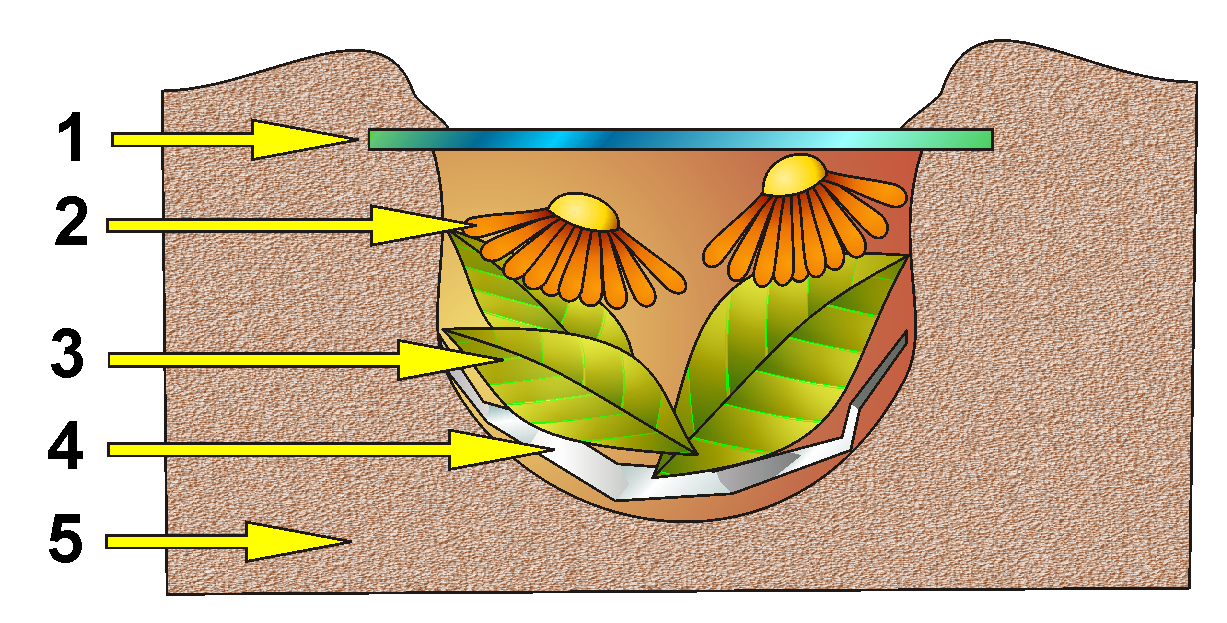
Skyscope schematics. 1. glass screen; 2. flowers; 3. leaves; 4. alluminium foil; 5. soil

Skyscope, also known as "The Secret" (Polish: widoczek, niebko, sekret, aniołek - skyview, secret, little angel), is a creative children's game, popular in Poland, Lithuania, and the 1960s Soviet Union.

The activity consists of creating some kind of a collage. In rarely visited places (often hidden parts of the backyard or school's playground), a hole was dug in the ground in which the child would put small items creating a visual composition, then cover them with a glass screen and bury them. The items used were usually common wild flowers, leaves, beads, pieces of aluminium foil or colourful wrappings and packages. The viewer privy to see Skyscope, in order to view it, had to clean the glass surface, sometimes using their own saliva.

The colour composition appearing in the hollow, randomly framed during cleansing, viewed through the thin glass, gives an artistic, often very unexpected and unpredictable effect created by the contrast with the surroundings. The game was popular in the cities at times when television was not commonly available.
