= I packed my bag =

Memorization game

I packed my bag is a memory game often played as a car game. In the traditional version of the game, one person says "I packed my bag and in it I put..." and names any object. The next person then says "I packed my bag and in it I put..." followed by the previous suggestions, then adding their own. The game continues with more objects being added, and a player is disqualified if they forget one of the previously occurring items or cannot think of a new item to add to the bag. The game continues until all but the winner has been disqualified.

== Example ==
In a gameplay scenario, what started as "I packed my bag and in it I put a toothbrush" may, after six further turns, become "I packed my bag and in it I put a toothbrush, a volleyball, a comic book, a banana, a deck of cards, a baseball cap, and a tent."

== Variants ==
=== Alphabetical ===
A common variation of the game is that the items listed must be in alphabetical order, so the first person would need to choose an object beginning with A, the second person's object would begin with B, and so on. Alternatively, objects can be named in any alphabetical order, but without repeating an earlier starting letter.

=== Scenario ===
Other variations can involve activities other than packing a bag. For example, "I went to the zoo and saw..." following the same rules as either of the above variants. Some known variants are played as "I packed my grandmother's trunk", "I went on a picnic", or "I went to the shops."

== See also ==
- Here Comes an Old Soldier from Botany Bay, a nursery rhyme sometimes sung in a similar way
