= Four corners (game) =

Children's game

- Genres: Tag variant
- Chance: Yes
- Skills: Prediction

Four corners is a children's game, often played in elementary schools. The object of the game is for players to choose corners of the room and not get caught by the designated "It" player until they are the last remaining participant.

== Gameplay ==
To begin, four corners (or general areas) of the room are marked from the numbers one to four. One player is designated to be "It," or the "counter." This player sits in the middle of the room and closes their eyes, or exits the room, and counts to ten. The remaining players choose any one of the corners and quietly go and stand in that area. When the "It" player has finished counting, they call out one of the numbers. All players who had chosen that corner or area are out of the game, and they sit down. Then, "It" counts again, and the remaining players move to a different corner, unless the corner is out.

The last person to still be in the game wins, and usually becomes the new "It."

If "It" calls out a corner containing no players, they either call out another number right away or the players rotate to a new corner, according to different versions of gameplay.

== French game ==
The rules are the same as in the Canadian game, but the fifth player is designated the "chamber pot". In L'Enfant, French author Jules Vallès calls "it" just the "pôt".

== Indian game ==
In some parts of India, a game similar to the Canadian game is played called "Nalugu Stambalata" (Four-poles game). Each corner of the square has a pole/pillar which the players attempt to touch.

== See also ==
- Puss in the corner (children's game)
