= Dandy shandy =

Children's game

Dandy shandy is a game played mainly by children, mostly girls in the Caribbean island of Jamaica. It is believed that children invented the game. It is not certain as to when the game was invented but it can be tracked back to as far as the 1950s.

== Rules ==
It is played with a minimum of three players. Two players stand about fifty feet apart facing each other and are considered the throwers. They are partners working together against the third player who is the dodger. The third player (dodger), runs back and forth in between the two throwers, whose job is to try to hit the dodger with a ball. The goal of the dodger is to dodge as many throws while running back and forth between the two throwers. The strategy is to stay as far as possible from the thrower that has the ball. For every attempt that the dodger dodges successfully they receive a point. A Thrower may strategically throw the ball to the opposite thrower in a manner where the ball is easy to catch and is of no threat to the dodger in an attempt to set up a play for the opposite thrower to get a good chance of hitting the dodger.

The game requires a great degree of athletic ability, some throwers can throw the ball as fast as 70 to 80 MPH. They have to be accurate throwers with control so that if they do miss a potential dodger the opposite thrower is able to catch the ball and make a throw in stride. Good dodgers are usually even more athletic, they run between throwers with their eyes on the ball jumping, leaping and even diving out of the way of an incoming throw. The ball is usually home made from a small paper carton stuffed with newspaper.
