= Chor Police (game) =

Role-playing pastime game

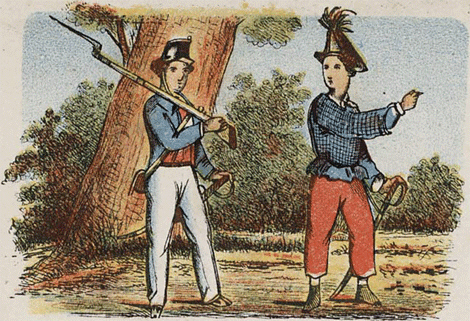
- Illustration of Chor Police
- Genres: Role-playing game
- Players: Infinite
- Playing time: 20–30 minutes
- Skills: Teamwork, Tact, Assertiveness, Invisibility
- Synonyms: Chor Sipahi

Chor Police (transl. Thief and Police), also known as Chor Sipahi, is an outdoor role-playing game played by children in the Indian subcontinent. The game is usually played by children divided into two teams with no limit of players. One team acts as police and another one acts as thieves within a narrative. Police players chase chor (thieves) in an attempt to catch and mark them defeated.

== Rules ==
Since the game revolves around cops and thieves, police has to catch the thieves in order to defeat opposite team. Once the team is defeated after a successful run-and-catch, police has to play the role of thieves and hence thieves become police and it continues vice versa until the game ends.

== Origin ==
The Chor Police game is played in several countries under different names and with a set of different rules formed by local players. Its origin is not known.
