= What's the time, Mr Wolf? =

Playground game

Mr. Fox, What time is it?
What's the time, Mr. Wolf?
- Players: 2+
- Setup time: <1 minute
- Playing time: No limit
- Chance: Low to medium
- Age range: All ages
- Skills: Running, strategy, endurance, time-keeping, bravery, tenacity

Mr. Fox, what time is it?, or What's the time, Mr. Wolf?, is a popular tag game in many English-speaking regions, or some former British colonies. There are quite a sum of variants, but the basic element is that players ask the tagger the time and the tagger replies with an hour of a day, such as five o'clock. While its origin is not very clear, but its early rules and game plays were recorded in 1899 book from London in the United Kingdom as "Pray, Mr. Fox, what time is it?", and in another 1917 book from the University of California in the United States as "If you please, Mr. Fox, what time is it?".

The games evolved with new names other than fox, such as wolf and shark, or using different question words, such as "What's the time?", or moving the Mr. animal to the end of the question.

The game is popular in many parts of the world, such as Australia, Canada, the English-speaking Caribbean, Hong Kong, Ireland, New Zealand, South Africa, the United Kingdom and the United States.

The 1899 book is "A History of Nursery Rhymes" by Percy B. Green. The author described Mr. Fox's "Twelve o'clock" as "the sly and foxy answer to the question", demonstrating the cunning of the fox, a traditional belief in England. The tagger needs to manipulate the hours in order to achieve a successful "hunt".

The game was introduced to physical education as early as 1917, and was recited in education publications many times. Because it needs attention skills, quick reactions, and working memory for the "it" child, it is recommended by Harvard University's Center on the Developing Child to assist in developing executive function skills for children aged 5 to 7.

== Original rules ==
=== Pray, Mr. Fox, what time is it ===
In 1899 "Pray, Mr. Fox, what time is it?", here were the rules.

1. A child, denominated Mr. Fox, stands on a hillock, or slightly elevated ground.
2. A party of children, hand in hand, approach him.
3. The children ask Mr. Fox a question, "Pray, Mr. Fox, what time is it?"
4. Mr. Fox answers an hour, from one to twelve, says "One o'clock".
5. Except when it's "Twelve o'clock", children are safe and fall back to their den.
6. Repeat again and again until "Twelve o'clock".
7. Mr. Fox shouts "Twelve o'clock", bounding towards the children and scattering them in all direction.
8. The children go back to their den.
9. Mr. Fox catches the children before they go back to their den.
10. Those caught are prisoners.
11. The game is played until one remains.
12. The one remains become Mr. Fox and new game starts.

=== If you please, Mr. Fox, what time is it? ===
In 1917 "If you please, Mr. Fox, what time is it?" was classified as a tag game and showed something different.

1. Make off a den in one corner.
2. Make off a chicken yard in another corner.
3. Choose a player to be Mr. Fox.
4. Choose another player to be the mother hen.
5. The mother hen arranges the chickens in a compact group.
6. The mother hen leads them up close to the fox's den.
7. The mother hen stands between the chickens and Mr. Fox.
8. The mother hen inquires "If you please, Mr. Fox, what time is it?"
9. Mr. Fox replies an hour.
10. Except when it's "Twelve o'clock at night", they are safe and may play about.
11. The mother hen lets the chickens play a moment.
12. The mother hen gets the chickens.
13. Repeat again and again until "Twelve o'clock at night".
14. Mr. Fox replies "Twelve o'clock at night" and tries to tag one.
15. The mother hen and the chickens runs to chicken yard.
16. Choose a player to be Mr. Fox and another to be the mother hen.
17. The games begins as before.

== Basic rules ==
Modern rules require only very simple settings. It can be played indoors or outdoors, as long as there is ample, safe space to run. The game is quite similar to the original, like this:

1. Although the game can be played with two players, it is better with four or more players.
2. Choose one player to be Mr. Fox, who stands at one end of the playing field.
3. The other players stand at the opposite end.
4. The players chant in unison, "What time is it, Mr. Fox?"
5. Mr. Fox then answers with an hour, between one and twelve, for example, "Five o'clock."
6. Except when it’s "Twelve o'clock", the players move towards Mr. Fox, step by step, counting aloud as they go. So, if Mr. Fox says "Five o'clock", they count "One, two, three, four, five".
7. The players continue asking "What time is it, Mr. Fox?" and play again until Mr. Fox calls "Twelve o'clock".
8. At "Twelve o'clock", Mr. Fox chases and attempts to tag a player.
9. The players run to avoid being tagged.
10. When one of the players is tagged, that player becomes Mr. Fox for the next round.

In British culture, the fox is considered a clever creature. Mr. Fox must use his intelligence to choose the right answer and timing in order to "hunt". In the above game, it is possible that Mr. Fox may be unable to tag anyone, causing the round to become boring. To address this, the original concept of a den, or safe place, is reintroduced to shorten the round. For example, the players could return to the starting point, which serves as a safe den. When all the players have returned to the den, Mr. Fox gets another chance to start the game and tag a player with clever answers.

The game could refer to a female player as Mrs. Fox instead. Additionally, another common alternative to Fox is Wolf, which plays a similar role in British stories. Instead of "Twelve o'clock", it could be "Dinner Time", "Lunch Time", "Supper Time", or "Midnight". Also, instead of asking "What time is it?", the players can ask "What's the time?"

== Variants ==
=== United Kingdom ===
An additional element of play in some versions of the game, such as that often played in the United Kingdom, sees the game set up with Mr. Fox standing against a wall or similar such structure, and whilst his back is turned from the players, they also have the option of trying to sneak in either extended length steps or to add additional steps undetected by the fox, with the aim of reaching the "safety" of the wall to either side of the fox ahead of the other players. If they successfully reach the wall by this method, then the player will call out "Safe" or "Home" (or similar variant), thus becoming exempt from being caught by the fox.

In many versions which include this element, if the fox hears these extra steps being taken by a player whilst his back is turned, then he will call out "Heard you!" and spin around to point at the suspected player. If the fox's accusation is correct, then depending on the version being played, the offending player will either have to return to the position they first started the game in (leaving them to likely be the last to reach "Home" and thus most likely to be caught by the fox), or to themselves simply become the fox by default. In addition, if the offending player is within the fox's reach when he turns around to accuse them, the fox may simply attempt to grab them - if successful, the captured player will again then become the fox.

An occasional further condition to the above version, is that sometimes that player(s) who safely make it "home" ahead of time without being spotted by the fox, must stand facing the wall, so as not to offer any support nor distraction to either the fox of the remaining players.

=== North America ===
Another variant of this game which has become popular is "Mr. Shark, Mr. Shark, what time is it?", or "What's the Time, Mr. Shark?"The big difference is that this game is played in a swimming pool, lake, or other swimming area. When Lunch Time is called the player may try running through the water or swimming to get away from the shark.

=== Hong Kong ===
In Hong Kong, the game is often played in Cantonese, the lingua franca of the city. The opening call is 狐狸先生幾多點 (Jyutping: wu^{4} lei^{5} sin^{1} saang^{1} gei^{3} do^{1} dim^{2}; lit. "what time is it, Mr. Fox"), and "twelve o'clock" (十二點; sap^{6} ji^{6} dim^{2}) is typically used instead of the name of a mealtime.

=== Others ===
It is not uncommon for "Mr. Fox" to be allowed to look around at the other players, before answering the question; especially if there is a rule involving penalties applied to "Mr. Fox" if a player reaches "Mr. Fox" before "Dinner time" is called.

There is also a simpler version of the game where "Mr. Fox" faces the other players, who must remain stationary until "dinner time" is called. If any player moves on a time of day being called, that player becomes "Mr. Fox".

In another version, Mr. Fox holds a dandelion seed head and blows on it. The other players dance around them, taunting them by calling out "What's the time, Mr. Fox?" After each blow, Mr. Fox calls times in ascending order (e.g. "1 o'clock", "two o'clock", etc) until all the seed head has been blown away. "Mr. Fox" then calls out "Dinner time!" and chases the other players, aiming to tag them before they can claim sanctuary at predesignated points called "Bar". The players claim "Bar" by yelling out "B - A - R Bar" and touching the safety point. The skill is in deciding when the seed head is going to be completely blown away, as the players cannot run away until this happens. It could happen after one blow by "Mr. Fox", or several. The first player tagged becomes Mr. Fox for the next round of the game.

This game can also be played on a hopscotch court. The players chant "What's the time Mr. Fox" and the fox replies with a time. The players hop that number of spaces forwards on the hopscotch court. If "Mr. Fox" answers with "It's dinner time" the players try to run back to the beginning of the hopscotch court before they are caught by "Mr. Fox".

A variant also exists in which the tagged players become wolves themselves, helping to tag the other players. The original fox, however, still calls the numbers.

== Similar games ==
Similar games include Lupo Delle Ore in Italy, and Captain Midnight in the United States, in which everyone has to start running at midnight. The game also bears some resemblance to Red light, green light and Dahrumasan ga koronda.

== Popular culture ==
=== In music ===
- The game was the basis for a 1991 song of "What's the Time, Mr. Wolf?" by New Zealand band Southside of Bombay, which appeared on the soundtrack of the film Once Were Warriors (1994). It peaked at number three on the New Zealand Singles Chart for four weeks following the movie's release, finishing the year as the eighth-best-selling single and earning a gold sales certification.
- What's the Time Mr. Wolf? is the title of a 2007 album by British band Noisettes.
- What Time Is It, Mr. Fox? is the name of a cabaret art rock band from Boston.
- "What's the Time Mr. Wolf?" is a song by The Scaramanga Six, released on their 2017 album Chronica and the Wiggles, released on their 2019 album, Party Time!.

=== In print ===
- The game has inspired children's books with this and similar titles. One was published in 2003 and illustrated by Annie Kubler (ISBN 085953944X), a second, published in 2007, was written and illustrated by Gemma Raynor (ISBN 1845392779). Harcourt published What Time Is It, Mr. Crocodile (2002), written by Judy Sierra and illustrated by Doug Cushman.

This is the title of a short story by Lauren Groff, first published in the New Yorker on April 27, 2021. It is also included in the author's collection of short stories, "Brawler", published by Penguin Random House in 2026 (ISBN 9780593418420)

=== In film ===
- The 1983 New Zealand film Utu, an historic drama depicting a Maori exacting revenge on English settlers in the 1870s, includes a scene where Maori leader Te Wheke beheads a vicar in a church, then places the bloodied head on the pulpit, saying the line "What's the time, Mr. Wolf?"
- The 2019 Guy Ritchie film The Gentlemen includes a scene whilst Ray is in a tower block, some young street urchins are goading the gangster guarding the car, they spot his watch and one says "What's the time Mr. Wolf ?"

=== In television ===
- The Australian children's show Bluey had moments where the children played this game in the episode "Shadowlands".
- A TV series OmoBerry had an episode titled "What Time is it Mr. Fox?"
