= Special Agent Oso season 2 =

Special Agent Oso
- Season 2
- No. of episodes: 36 (66 half-episode segments and 3 full episodes)

Release
- Original network: Playhouse Disney; Disney Junior
- Original release: May 6, 2010 – May 17, 2012

Series chronology
- ← Previous; Season 1

The second and final season of Special Agent Oso premiered on May 6, 2010 on Playhouse Disney and its series finale aired May 17, 2012 on Disney Junior.

== Episodes ==
No. overall	No. in season	Title	Written by	Original release date	Prod. code
25a	1a	"Quantum of Sandwich"	John Loy	May 6, 2010	201a
When Dotty trains Oso to fly and land his training space jet at the space center, Oso tries remembering how to line up and land the space jet. He helps a boy in Astoria named Dylan make a peanut butter and jelly sandwich for his school lunch while his mother gets ready for work, before the school bus arrives and takes him to school.: Step 1: Get two slices of bread; Step 2: Spread the peanut butter and jelly; Step 3: Put the two slices of bread together (13); Title reference: Quantum of Solace
25b	1b	"Thunder Muffin"	Noelle Wright	May 6, 2010	201b
As Wolfie trains Oso to repair the new Shutterbug control computer, Oso tries remembering how to put the computer chips properly. He helps a girl in Porto named Sophie, who has baked some carrot muffins with her mom for a school bake sale, prepare the muffins with the frosting and raisins before she and her mom have to leave for school.: Step 1: Frost the carrot muffins; Step 2: Put raisins on them; Step 3: Put them in a box (3); Title reference: Thunderball
26a	2a	"Dr. Go"	Noelle Wright	July 17, 2010	202a
Wolfie trains Oso to water ski up a ramp and jump into the lake with falling and without falling. A special alert is called after Oso jumps off the incorrect end of the ramp and takes a face first plunge. A girl in New Mexico named Emily wants to play with her brother Matthew's remote-control car, while he and his friends fix the tires on theirs, but she does not know how yet. It is up to Oso to help her race the car before the children return.: Step 1: Turn the car on; Step 2: Make it go forward; Step 3: Steer the car around the track (5); Title reference: Dr. No
26b	2b	"For Your Bed Only"	John Loy	July 17, 2010	202b
As Oso practices covering his special agent car with a blanket that matches the surroundings, he receives a special alert and gets covered with the blanket. In Colombia, Oso helps a girl named Kayla, who is going to have a sleepover with her best friend Ashley, make the bed before Ashley comes.: Step 1: Straighten and pull up the sheet; Step 2: Pull up the bedspread; Step 3: Arrange the pillows and stuffed animals (7); Title reference: For Your Eyes Only
27a	3a	"Another Way to Fly"	Ford Riley	July 10, 2010	201a
While being trained to help Dotty and Wolfie make a speedy escape on Rapide, Oso receives a special alert from Colorado. A girl named Lizzie is going to make a paper airplane to fly in a paper airplane contest, but she does not know how to make one yet. It is up to Oso to help her out before she leaves for the contest.: Step 1: Fold a sheet of paper in half; Step 2: Make the airplane body; Step 3: Fold down the wings (14); Title reference: "Another Way to Die", the theme song to Quantum of Solace.
27b	3b	"A View to a Ball"	Ford Riley	July 10, 2010	201b
While Dotty trains Oso to make a space rescue and get Wolfie in the space jet, he receives a special alert from Oahu. At the beach, a girl named Kaylee wants to play catch with her brother, Brandon, but she does not know how to catch a ball yet. So Oso must help her catch a ball before they leave for home.: Step 1: Get in front of the ball; Step 2: Grab the ball with your hands; Step 3: Pull the ball to your chest (12); Title reference: A View to a Kill
28a	4a	"From China with Love"	Ford Riley	July 24, 2010	203a
Oso gets a visit from Professor Buffo, who creates all the gadgets and vehicles for the organization Oso works for. Because Professor Buffo likes keeping his laboratory clean, Oso and Dotty have to change into their clean room suits. After getting changed, Oso drops his cap on the floor and the scanner scans him as "dirty" and gets sucked up a tube and into a laundry cart. That's when a special alert is called from China. On Chinese New Year, two boys named Rick and Noyoon are having dinner at Noyoon's grandfather's house. Rick has never eaten with chopsticks before and Noyoon does not how to teach him yet. Oso has to help them use chopsticks before dinner.: Step 1: Press one chopstick between your middle finger and thumb; Step 2: Hold the other chopstick between your pointer finger and thumb; Step 3: Move the chopstick with your pointer finger to grab food (8); Title reference: From Russia with Love
28b	4b	"Thunderbasket"	Written by : John Loy; Story by : Ford Riley	July 24, 2010	203b
While Wolfie trains Oso to clear a big boulder off a railroad track with help from Whirly Bird, Paw Pilot calls in a special alert from Kansas City. Oso helps a boy named Pete play basketball before his babysitter Susan comes.: Step 1: Face the basket; Step 2: Hold the ball in front of you; Step 3: Shoot the ball (6); Title references Thunderball
29a	5a	"Goldscooter"	John Loy	July 31, 2010	204a
As Dotty puts Oso through a practice emergency exit drill, Oso tries looking for the door with a flashing red light and thinking fast, but he falls back on the conveyor belt and receives a special alert from Tampa. For his special assignment, Oso helps a girl named Harper ride a scooter at the park before her sister Vicky comes.: Step 1: Put one foot on the scooter; Step 2: Push off with the other foot; Step 3: Put both feet on the scooter and ride (6); Title reference: Goldfinger
29b	5b	"The Boy with the Colored Crayons"	Kent Redeker	July 31, 2010	204b
While Dotty trains Oso to rescue Wolfie from a tank of water on the red tower, and as Oso tries figuring out the fastest way to get there besides climbing stairs, a special alert is called from Kyiv. A girl named Ursula has brought home a picture she colored in school to show her mom, and her brother Ivan wants to make a picture too. Ursula lets Ivan color a picture in her coloring book, but he is not good at it yet. Oso decides to help him color a picture to show it to his dad before he comes home.: Step 1: Pick a picture you want to color; Step 2: Pick the crayon colors; Step 3: Color the picture (12); Title reference: The Man with the Golden Gun
30a	6a	"Goldputter"	Noelle Wright	August 7, 2010	205a
As Wolfie trains Oso in Morocco to drive a dune buggy while he collects all the flags, Oso stops his buggy on the sloppy part of a sand dune when he receives a special alert from Paw Pilot, causing it to roll downhill and crash. He helps two boys in St. Louis named Jayden and Ryan, who are playing mini golf, get the ball into the hole before they leave for home.: Step 1: Place the ball on the putting green; Step 2: Aim the ball at the hole; Step 3: Tap the ball into the hole (19); Title reference: Goldfinger
30b	6b	"Live and Leaf Rub"	Krista Tucker	August 7, 2010	205b
In Australia, Oso must make his way through an obstacle course while dodging Wolfie's water balloons, until he gets drenched in water balloons when he tries to crawl under the fence and gets a special alert from Manitoba. He helps a girl named Sadie make a leaf rubbing for her grandma's birthday present.: Step 1: Put a leaf on a piece of paper; Step 2: Put another piece of paper over the leaf; Step 3: Rub a crayon over the top sheet of paper (7); Title references: Live and Let Die
31a	7a	"Dr. Juice"	Noelle Wright	August 14, 2010	206a
As Dotty trains Oso to trap a spy copter, Oso tries remembering how to operate the net and catch the spy copter before it flies away until he got sprayed and covered in cream. Two sisters from Paris, France named Zoe and Alex are going to make fresh squeezed orange juice for their mother who has a cold, but they do not know how to make it. Oso has to help them make it before their mother wakes up.: Step 1: Find some oranges; Step 2: Squeeze the oranges to get the juice; Step 3: Pour the juice into a glass (5); Title reference: Dr. No
31b	7b	"For Your Nose Only"	Krista Tucker	August 14, 2010	206b
While being trained to put a snow flap in the North Pole, Oso tries snapping the flap in place when a special alert is called from Australia. A boy named Thomas has a cold. His mother tells him to use a tissue to blow his nose, but Thomas does not know how to do it yet. It is up to Oso to help Thomas blow his nose before his mom comes up with some tea.: Step 1: Hold the tissue over your nose; Step 2: Gently blow out through your nose; Step 3: Wipe your nose with the tissue, then throw it into the trash (7); Title reference: For Your Eyes Only
32a	8a	"The Man with the Golden Retriever"	Jack Monaco	August 21, 2010	207a
As Oso retrieves a deep sea probe from under the ocean, he tries finding it and being careful around underwater volcanoes when Paw Pilot calls in a special alert from Regensburg. A girl named Elsa meets a new friend at the park, Mr. Thompson, who has a dog named Madeline. Mr. Thompson asks Elsa if she would like to pet Madeline, but she has never done that before. Oso helps Elsa pet the dog before they leave for the pet fair.: Step 1: Ask the owner for permission; Step 2: Hold out your hand so the dog can sniff it; Step 3: Pet the dog gently (7); Title reference: The Man with the Golden Gun
32b	8b	"The Chairs are Not Enough"	John Loy	August 21, 2010	207b
Dotty trains Oso to bungee jump off a tower. During his training mission, Oso tries grabbing a cube-shape container, but misses it when a special alert is called from Turkey. Two children named Rasheed and Layla are invited to a birthday party where they will be playing musical chairs. Oso helps Rasheed and Layla play musical chairs before the party starts.: Step 1: Set up the chairs; Step 2: Walk around the chairs while the music plays; Step 3: Sit in a chair when the music stops (5); Title reference: The World Is Not Enough
33a	9a	"Colors Royale"	Noelle Wright	October 4, 2010	209a
Dotty and Wolfie train Oso to go through the swamp without leaving a trail of footprints or being followed. Although Oso managed to cover his footprints, he got caught by Dotty and Wolfie after accidentally leaving his muddy paw prints all over the swamp trees. A boy in Fukuoka named Nicholas is going to paint a picture for his grandpa, but has trouble mixing the right colors. Oso helps him mix yellow and blue paint to make green so he can paint the grass in his painting to show his grandpa.: Step 1: Get red, yellow, and blue paint; Step 2: Put the paint on your palette; Step 3: Mix two colors to get a new one (12); Title reference: Casino Royale
33b	9b	"Cleanfingers"	Jack Monaco	October 4, 2010	209b
The water for the shower on Rapide is empty, so Dotty and Wolfie train Oso to fill up Rapide's water tank using a hose. After filling up the tank, Oso unplugs the hose with the water still running, sending him flying in the air with the hose out of control. A special alert is called, in which he teaches a boy in Brazil named Charlie the importance of washing his hands before eating.: Step 1: Rub your hands with soap; Step 2: Rinse your hands; Step 3: Dry your hands (6); Title reference: Goldfinger
34a	10a	"A View to a Mask"	Jack Monaco	October 8, 2010	210a
Wolfie trains Oso in the Arabian Desert to deliver a briefcase to a building while driving in an armored vehicle. Oso must be careful not to knock over any statues while driving, but cannot see where he is driving and knocks several statues down. For his special assignment, Oso helps a boy in Ireland named Kevin make a Halloween mask out of a paper plate to go with his tiger costume, before the party starts.: Step 1: Draw a face on the paper plate; Step 2: Attach the string; Step 3: Cut out the eye and mouth holes (13); Title reference: A View to a Kill
34b	10b	"Pumpkin Eyes"	Written by : Kent Redeker; Story by : Ford Riley	October 8, 2010	210b
Wolfie trains Oso to find a special microchip hidden in room number three in a short amount of time (45 seconds). Oso tries to find the hidden microchip, but the time expires, and then Oso gets sucked up a trap tube, out of the building, and into his car. A special alert is coming, in which Oso helps a girl in Eau Claire named Nevaeh and her dad make a Jack-o'-lantern just like Nevaeh's friend, Justin, so that they could bring it to the Jack-o'-lantern contest on Halloween.: Step 1: Clean out the pumpkin; Step 2: Make the Jack-o'-lantern's face; Step 3: Put a light in the Jack-o'-lantern (12); Title reference: GoldenEye
35	11	"The Living Holiday Lights"	Ford Riley; John Loy; Jonathan Rosenthal	December 6, 2010	211
Oso helps a girl in France named Celeste decorate for Christmas.: Step 1: Get the advent wreath; Step 2: Put the candles in the wreath; Step 3: Have a grownup light the candles (12); Oso helps a Jewish boy in Jerusalem, Israel named Noah decorate for Hanukkah.: Step 1: Find the Menorah; Step 2: Put the candles in the menorah; Step 3: Have a grownup light the candles (8); Oso helps a boy in the Washington D.C., United States named Brayden decorate for Kwanzaa.: Step 1: Find the kinara; Step 2: Put the candles in the kinara; Step 3: Have a grownup light the candles; Title reference: The Living Daylights
36a	12a	"For Angels with Snow"	John Loy	December 13, 2010	212a
At the space center, Professor Buffo locked himself in the rocket by mistake and Oso must get the keys to unlock the door. He finds the keys and tries looking for the correct one to unlock the rocket until he gets sprayed by stone mist. That's when a special alert happens, in which Oso helps a boy in Palmerston North named Liam make snow angels, before his grandmother sees.: Step 1: Lie back on the snow; Step 2: Move your arms and legs back and forth; Step 3: Stand up carefully (10); Title reference: From Russia with Love
36b	12b	"Dr. Snow"	Written by : Kent Redeker; Story by : Ford Riley	December 13, 2010	212b
Dotty teaches Oso how to use a special agent cable jacket to go down a tube and open a door that has the number 9. When Oso opens the incorrect door that has the number 6 after being upside down and gets covered with ping pong balls, he receives a special alert from Northern Italy, where he helps a boy named Ethan make a snow globe.: Step 1: Decorate the inside of a jar lid; Step 2: Put water and glitter into the jar; Step 3: Seal the lid onto the jar (11); Title reference: Dr. No
37a	13a	"License to Sled"	Noelle Wright	December 27, 2010	213a
While riding on a snowmobile chase with a pack of penguins after him, Oso tries to keep his balance but ends up leaning sideways and he tips over. That's when a special alert happens, in which Oso helps two kids in North Island named Hailey and Henry, go sledding before their cousins, Tess and Molly arrive.: Step 1: Get on the sled; Step 2: Push off with your hands; Step 3: Hold on (12); Title reference: Licence to Kill
37b	13b	"Snowflakes are Forever"	Krista Tucker	December 27, 2010	213b
Dotty and Wolfie train Oso to launch his motorcycle off Rapide while traveling from South Africa. Oso tries remembering what Dotty and Wolfie told him to do while Rapide is moving, but he open the ramp a little and takes a spill. For his special assignment, Oso helps a Peruvian girl named Gabriella make a paper snowflake just like her older sister, Valentina, so she can use it for the winter festival before it starts.: Step 1: Fold a piece of paper; Step 2: Cut the paper; Step 3: Unfold the paper (7); Title reference: Diamonds Are Forever
38a	14a	"Dr. Throw"	Krista Tucker	January 7, 2011	214a
Dotty trains Oso to jump out of the space jet with a parachute and land onto an iceberg. While waiting Wolfie finds him for rescuing, Oso slips off the iceberg and into the water. A special alert comes in, where Oso helps a boy in Plymouth named Rudy throw a football while his mom does some weeding.: Step 1: Grip the football; Step 2: Look at the person you're throwing to; Step 3: Move your arm back and then throw the ball (10); Title reference: Dr. No
38b	14b	"Nobody Plays "it" Better"	Written by : John Loy; Story by : Don Gillies	January 7, 2011	214b
Professor Buffo has invented a rocket that goes very fast. As he gets Oso to drive around a race track twice while being timed, Oso suddenly crashes Buffo's rocket into a curve. For his special assignment, Oso goes to Moscow to teach a boy named Alexander and a girl named Elena at the park so they will know to play tag.: Step 1: Pick who's going to be it; Step 2: Count to 5 and run after your friends; Step 3: Tag one of your friends (8); Title reference: "Nobody Does It Better", the theme song to The Spy Who Loved Me
39a	15a	"On Old MacDonald's Special Song"	Dan Riley	April 4, 2011	218a
While training to open a garage by pressing buttons on a keypad in a certain pattern, Oso presses all the buttons at once and gets launched high into the air. A boy in New York named Henry is having trouble playing "Old MacDonald" on the piano while his grandpa Mel is sleeping and his mom is too busy making pizza. Oso helps Henry play the song properly before his Aunt Stephanie comes over so he can play for her.: Step 1: Find a group of three black keys; Step 2: Learn what keys to play; Step 3: Press the keys as you sing (4); Title reference: On Her Majesty's Secret Service
39b	15b	"Snapfingers"	Jack Monaco	April 4, 2011	218b
As Wolfie assigns Oso a training mission to open a door by scanning a card, he must walk up the wall and on the ceiling in magnetic boots provided by Professor Buffo. Oso tries to open the door when he falls from the ceiling and onto the floor, but he gets scanned and launched into a trap tube. A girl named Nicole and a boy named Spencer are at a Snapasonic concert in Minsk with their Uncle Eric to hear their favorite song and snap their fingers. Neither of them know how to snap, so it is up to Oso to help Nicole and Spencer snap their fingers before the concert begins.: Step 1: Put your middle finger on your thumb; Step 2: Press those two fingers together; Step 3: Slide your finger down and your thumb up (12); Title reference: Goldfinger
40a	16a	"Quantum of Sauce"	John Loy	January 24, 2011	215a
Agent Wolfie trains Oso to change the nose cone on a deep sea probe before launching it. Oso tries to remember how to put on the replacement nose cone on the probe. A girl in Bloemfontein named Taylor is eating spaghetti for dinner, but whenever she eats it, she spills sauce on her clothes. Oso is tasked to teach Taylor how to eat spaghetti in a clean manner, without spilling sauce on her new dress. Step 1: Scoop spaghetti onto your fork Step 2: Twirl the fork to wrap the spaghetti around it Step 3: Turn the fork over and lift it to your mouth (6) Title reference: Quantum of Solace
40b	16b	"The Girl with the Folded Clothes"	Krista Tucker	January 24, 2011	215b
Oso is on the moon training to use a moon-buggy, until losing his key. He helps a girl in Malaysia named Lydia fold clothes to surprise her mother. Step 1: Fold the shirts Step 2: Fold the pants Step 3: Pair up matching socks (7) Title reference: The Man with the Golden Gun
41a	17a	"Greenfinger"	John Loy; Jonathan Rosenthal	February 14, 2011	216a
Dotty trains Oso in Cyprus to climb up cliffs to the red flag without letting Wolfie's searchlight get him. Oso tries avoiding Wolfie's light until Paw Pilot calls in a special alert, and he falls into the lake. A girl in Jamaica named Makayla wants to water potted plants that have soil, roots, and leaves, but she cannot do it yet. It is up to Oso to help Makayla water potted plants before she leaves for school. Step 1: Find the watering can Step 2: Fill it with water Step 3: Pour water onto the soil around the plant (6) Title reference: Goldfinger
41b	17b	"For Sleepy Eyes Only"	Jack Monaco	February 14, 2011	216b
Professor Buffo trains Oso to load fuel canisters onto the rocket ship. Oso tries getting the fuel to the rocket ship, but he goes too fast causing the canisters to fly off. He helps an Algerian girl named Nadia, who is having a birthday party tomorrow, relax so that she can fall asleep and be wide awake for her birthday party. Step 1: Close your eyes Step 2: Take a deep breath in and let it out Step 3: Relax your whole body (3) Title reference: For Your Eyes Only
42a	18a	"Live and Let Heal"	Mike Rabb	February 23, 2011	217a
While flying in the air, Oso is given a training exercise from Dotty where he must stick a jet-tracking device to the wing of a red jet. However, he gets the device stuck onto him and slips off the plane after Paw Pilot calls in a special alert. Oso helps a boy in South Island named Caleb help his brother named Malcolm clean and bandage his scraped knee while his mom is on the phone. Step 1: Clean the dirt off the scrape Step 2: Choose a bandage Step 3: Cover the scrape with the bandage (7) Title reference: Live and Let Die
42b	18b	"GoldenFish"	Noelle Wright	February 23, 2011	217b
As Dotty and Wolfie teach Oso how to go paragliding for his training exercise, Oso holds onto the rope as he gets pulled along. However, Oso does not pay any attention to Dotty's warning of a bridge up ahead, and he crashes into it and loses his grip on the rope. He is then tasked with helping a boy in Argentina, Santiago, feed his goldfish Swimmy while his father is busy changing his baby brother's diaper.: Step 1: Find the fish food; Step 2: Pick up a pinch of fish food; Step 3: Sprinkle the fish food into the water (8); Title reference: GoldenEye
43a	19a	"For Tamales with Love"	Maria Escobedo; Charles Gherardi	September 15, 2011	227a
As Wolfie puts Oso through a water rescue for his training exercise, he rides a water bike to save Dotty. However, Oso presses down on the pedal too hard and loses control, before taking a splashing spill into Dotty's raft and into the ocean with a seagull on his head. A girl in Mexico named Carmen wants to show her cousins Maritza and Javier how she can make tamales by herself, but she does not know how. Oso has to help Carmen make tamales before her abuela gets ready to cook them. Step 1: Press the masa onto the corn husk. Step 2: Add a spoonful of filling. Step 3: Wrap the tamale. (6) Title reference: From Russia with Love
43b	19b	"Piñata Royale"	Don Gillies	September 15, 2011	227b
In a department shopping store, when Oso was trained by Wolfie to follow Dotty without letting her see him, but Oso steps into a TV store, see that she is not in here, stumbles on the plant pot, rolls down in the hallway, into a fountain, then he loses sight of her. Two brothers in Mexico named Luis and Miguel are shopping for a piñata for their sister Mariana's Quinceañera (15th birthday party). Neither of them know how to prepare the piñata for the party, so it is up to Oso to help them get the piñata ready before the guests arrive. Step 1: Pick out a piñata Step 2: Fill the piñata Step 3: Hang the piñata (11) Title reference: Casino Royale
44a	20a	"Lost and Get Found"	John Loy	April 6, 2011	220a
Professor Buffo trains Oso to find the real Agent Wolfie in 6 robot clones of Wolfie's. Oso tries figuring out who is the real Wolfie when he gets a special alert. Three brothers named Juan, Jesus, and Julio are shopping with their mom at a department store in Madrid, Spain. Juan stops to look at a toy train, and he gets separated from his mom and brothers. Now he is lost and scared and it is up to Oso to help Juan find his family. Step 1: Stay in one place Step 2: Find a safe adult Step 3: Tell them your full name and tell that you're lost (3) Title reference: Live and Let Die
44b	20b	"A View to the Truth"	John Loy	April 6, 2011	220b
As Wolfie trains Oso to pilot a submarine, Oso leaves the hatch open by mistake, causing the water to seep inside Wolfie's submarine and it sinks. A girl in Hamburg named Lena accidentally knocks over her grandma's flower vase while taking her dog Bo outside. Lena lets Bo take the blame and she feels bad for not telling her what happened. Now, it is up to Oso to show Lena how to tell the truth about the flower vase to her grandma, and also do the same for Wolfie after sinking his submarine. Step 1: Apologize for what you did Step 2: Tell what happened Step 3: Ask to be forgiven Title reference: A View to a Kill
45a	21a	"License to Order"	Guy Toubes	April 5, 2011	219a
While doing road rallying in Northern Russia, Oso reads the map while Wolfie does the driving. However, Wolfie could not hear Oso's instructions because the engine is too loud. Paw Pilot calls in a special alert as Wolfie drives the car off a cliff and crashes it into a snowbank. A girl in Moscow named Anastasia is having dinner at a restaurant with her parents. Anastasia wants to order a healthy meal by herself, but she cannot read the menu yet. Oso helps her order her own dinner. Step 1: Look at the menu Step 2: Pick a healthy meal Step 3: Tell the waiter what you want (4) Title reference: Licence to Kill
45b	21b	"Table Manners are Forever"	Krista Tucker	April 5, 2011	219b
Dotty trains Oso in Malaysia to sneak onto Wolfie's boat and get a briefcase without being seen or heard. However, Musa beats Oso to the briefcase, and Wolfie launches Oso off the boat after hearing him talk. Two kids in British Columbia named Zack and Chloe are at a fancy dinner party to celebrate the wedding of their aunt Mary and uncle James, but Zack does not know much about using good table manners. It is up to Oso to teach Zack good table manners in order to show how polite he is. Step 1: Put your napkin on your lap Step 2: Eat with your fork, not your fingers Step 3: Chew with your mouth closed (6) First Appearance of: Musa Title reference: Diamonds Are Forever
46a	22a	"A View to a Fire Drill"	Krista Tucker	April 7, 2011	221a
Oso leads agents Dotty, Wolfie, and Musa through a cave in Russia for his training exercise. But he wanders off the path causing everyone to nearly fall off a ravine. That's when a special alert comes in from Hanover. Three girls named Marie, Charlotte, and Lisa want to practice a fire drill at school tomorrow, but neither of them know what to do. Marie wants to ask her mother if they can do a practice fire drill, but she is too busy working. Oso helps the girls stay safe in case of a real fire. Step 1: Line up single file Step 2: Walk quietly out of the building Step 3: Stay together until the teacher says it’s to go inside (3) Guest Star: Musa Title reference: A View to a Kill
46b	22b	"Thunderbelt"	Noelle Wright	April 7, 2011	221b
Professor Buffo trains Oso to open a vault where his inventions are stored. Oso needs to turn the dial and pull the handle to open it, but he fails to turn the dial all the way and he gets a special alert after setting off the alarm and getting himself frozen in ice. He helps a girl in Houston named Maya, who is going on a picnic in the car with her mom, fasten her seat belt before she and her mom drive to the picnic. Step 1: Face forward in your seat Step 2: Pull the seat belt across your chest and lap Step 3: Push the end of the seat belt into the buckle (8) Title reference: Thunderball
47a	23a	"License to Cheer Up"	John Loy	November 8, 2011	229a
As Wolfie trains Oso in Zimbabwe to drive a hovercraft, Oso's goal is to stay behind Wolfie during their flight, but he loses sight of Wolfie when he sees a bird ahead. Oso gets a special alert when he and Wolfie went on a collision course on two separate islands. At a school in Toronto, a girl named Jennifer is feeling sad, and her friend Gavin wants to cheer her up. Oso decides to help Gavin find a way to cheer up Jennifer before playtime ends. Step 1: Ask if your friend is okay Step 2: Find out what's wrong Step 3: Help your friend think of something happy (8) Title reference: Licence to Kill
47b	23b	"You Only Vote Once"	Earl Kress	November 8, 2011	229b
As Oso trains to test Professor Buffo's new hang glider, he is about to fly it to a mountain and land on one of the landing pads. Oso cannot decide which pad to land on, and he lands in the snow between one of the pads. Two girls in Geneva named Aubrey and Julia with their friends are having trouble deciding what to play. Some kids want to play kickball, while some others want to play hopscotch. Oso decides to help them vote for what to play. Step 1: Think about your choice Step 2: Vote for your choice Step 3: Count the votes to see what wins (3) Title reference: You Only Live Twice
48a	24a	"Quantum of Celery"	Written by : Kent Redeker; Story by : Ford Riley	April 8, 2011	222a
As Wolfie trains Oso to launch ten water balloons at a target, Oso overloads the launcher with too many balloons, and they get launched in all directions. A girl in Kamloops named Audrey has trouble making a healthy snack for school, Ants on a log, while her mother changes her baby sister's diaper. It is up to Oso to help her out before the bus comes to take her to school. Step 1: Get celery sticks Step 2: Fill the celery Step 3: Put raisins on the filling (11) Title reference: Quantum of Solace
48b	24b	"Drink Another Day"	Written by : Krista Tucker; Story by : Dan Riley	April 8, 2011	222b
While being trained by Wolfie on a deep sea search, Oso is about launch a deep sea probe in an underwater cave, but he launches it in the wrong direction and hits Wolfie's boat instead. A special alert is called. In Greece, Oso helps a girl, Athena, drink from the water fountain. Step 1: Turn on the water Step 2: Lean close to the spout Step 3: Pucker your lips and sip the water (7) Title reference: Die Another Day
49a	25a	"Dye Another Egg"	Noelle Wright	April 6, 2012	235a
Oso tries to catch a fish-shaped underwater camera with a net without touching it with his hands. He goes to Rome, Italy, and help two Italian kids named Gabriel and Kiara dye Easter eggs for an Easter egg hunt tomorrow before bedtime. Step 1: Put food coloring in water. Step 2: Dip the eggs Step 3: Take them out to dry. (16) Title reference: Die Another Day
49b	25b	"Dr. Skip"	Krista Tucker	April 6, 2012	235b
While Wolfie teaches Oso how to walk through a hallway using Professor Buffo's new foam blaster to cover the surveillance cameras, Oso covers seven of the cameras with the foam, leaving one of them, gets sighted and launched into a tank of water. Oso goes to the Philippines to help a girl, Jasmine, learn how to skip. Step 1: Step forward with one foot and hop on it. Step 2: Step forward with the other foot and hop on it. Step 3: Keep stepping and hopping (10) Title reference: Dr. No
50a	26a	"For Your Hands Only"	Jack Monaco	May 6, 2011	223a
As Dotty repairs the space jet, Oso makes the space pod light shining. However, Oso's attention gets turned around when he sees a shooting star, and he moves the light around, causing Dotty to do some damage on the space jet. A Korean girl named Eun-Kyung wants to make a handprint for a Mother's Day gift. However, her father is busy cooking dinner and her sister, Mee-wah, needs to go to soccer practice. So Oso has to help Eun-Kyung make handprints before her mother comes home for her special dinner. Step 1: Pour finger paint into a tray Step 2: Dip your hand into the finger paint Step 3: Press your hand onto a piece of paper (4) Title reference: For Your Eyes Only
50b	26b	"Thunderbeam"	Noelle Wright	May 6, 2011	223b
Professor Buffo makes Oso test the Hydro Bubble to walk on water. Oso's mission is to cross the lake and get onto Wolfie's boat, but he nears the boat, he gets tired from walking on the water and gets swept away by a waterfall. A girl in Cairo named Leah wants to join the Green Group Gymnastics class after watching her older sister Kyra walk across a balance beam. However, Leah is prohibited for taking part because she cannot do it yet. It is up to Oso to help Leah cross the balance beam to join the gymnastics before the class starts. Step 1: Stand on the balance beam Step 2: Hold out your arms Step 3: Put one foot in front of the other and walk across (13) Title reference: Thunderball
51a	27a	"Best Friends are Forever"	John Loy	September 2, 2011	226a
After agreeing with Dotty to help set up the new moon beacon, Dotty tells Oso to bring her the last piece of it to put the beacon together. Oso tries looking for the piece, but he brings the large one which it crushes his moon buggy. A girl in Mbombela named Madison is sad because her best friend, Aaliyah, is moving away. Oso decides to help Madison say goodbye to Aaliyah before she moves to her new home. Step 1: Spend a little time together Step 2: Give them something to remember you by Step 3: Share a goodbye hug (12) Title reference: Diamonds Are Forever
51b	27b	"For School Days Only"	Krista Tucker	September 2, 2011	226b
While training to go sail suit-gliding in the Himalayas, Oso cannot find his sail suit because he forgot his backpack, so he uses his parachute instead. However, he gets it caught on the ledge during his flight. A boy in North Dakota named Evan is getting ready for his first day of kindergarten, but feels nervous because he cannot get ready all by himself. Oso decides to help Evan get ready for school before he leaves. Step 1: Pack your backpack Step 2: Grab your lunch Step 3: Put on your jacket (3) Guest Star: Musa Title reference: For Your Eyes Only
52a	28a	"A View to a Goal"	Krista Tucker	May 30, 2011	224a
Dotty trains Oso to drive Wolfie's stunt car to the bottom of a mountain and to the Base Camp for a low-visibility mission. Because of the fog, Oso does not pay attention and drives Wolfie's car off a cliff. For his special assignment, Oso helps a boy in Brazil named Alberto play soccer and make a goal just like his brother, Marco. Step 1: Line up the ball with the goal Step 2: Get in position Step 3: Kick the ball towards the goal (8) Title reference: A View to a Kill
52b	28b	"Sweep Another Day"	John Loy	May 30, 2011	224b
In a jungle pursuit mission, Oso must catch Musa before he gets to the satellite dish during the chase. However, Oso steps into quicksand. For his special assignment, Oso helps a boy in Honduras named Xavier sweep up the floor of his playroom for a visit from his friend, Rafael. Step 1: Sweep the broom in one direction Step 2: Sweep the dirt into a pile Step 3: Sweep the dirt into a dustpan (12) Guest Star: Musa Title reference: Die Another Day
53a	29a	"Freeze Dance Royale"	Krista Tucker	August 12, 2011	225a
Oso helps Professor Buffo test his new submarine's sonar. As Buffo goes to work on his aqua pod, Oso tries to listen to the sonar and sound the alarm to signal Buffo. While Oso listens to some music on Paw Pilot, he is not alert with the sonar and the submarine gets hit by a blue whale. For his special assignment, Oso helps two kids in Taiwan named Mia and Lin play freeze dance with Chen and her friends. Step 1: Dance to the music Step 2: Stop dancing when the music stops, or else your out Step 3: Keep playing until someone wins (9) Title reference: Casino Royale
53b	29b	"The Boy with the Cardboard Fort"	John Loy	August 12, 2011	225b
Dotty trains Oso to drop water balloons on a target from high up in the air. However, Oso goes too fast and misses the target, causing Wolfie to be drenched in water balloons. For his special assignment, Oso helps a boy named Wyatt build a fort out of a cardboard box from which a new refrigerator came in before Wyatt's friend Isaac comes for a visit to play. Step 1: Put a big box on its side Step 2: Make the door and windows Step 3: Decorate the box. (8) Title reference: The Man with the Golden Gun
54a	30a	"Goldfanner"	Krista Tucker; John Loy	January 24, 2012	231a
Dotty trains Oso to stand in a spinning room for two minutes. However, he neglects to hold onto the bars. Meanwhile, a girl in China named Min has accidentally ripped a paper fan her mom made as a child, and Oso must help her make a new one before she and her mother leave for the big fan dance festival. Step 1: Decorate a piece of paper Step 2: Fold the paper into skinny rectangles Step 3: Hold one end and open carefully (5) Title reference: Goldfinger
54b	30b	"Connect Another Dot"	Krista Tucker	January 24, 2012	231b
While being trained by Dotty on code entry, Oso enters a code to open a tunnel gate, but he enters the incorrect code and takes a splashing spill. Oso helps a boy in Russia named Dimitri draw a connect-the-dots picture to show it to his grandpa. Step 1: Find dot #1; Step 2: Draw a line from dot #1 to dot #2; Step 3: Draw a line to the next dot until you reach the last one Title reference: Die Another Day
55a	31a	"License to Share"	Written by : Kent Redeker; Story by : Ford Riley	January 25, 2012	232a
Professor Buffo needs Oso's help to dig out for red crystals to bring them back for a surprise, using a new drill tank. When he is about to put them in a cart, Oso decides to carry all of the crystals and takes a "mine-tastical" cart ride down into the dirt. Oso helps two kids in Belarus named Chris and Kaitlyn share a toy cash register. Step 1: Agree to share the toy Step 2: Decide which person plays with the toy first Step 3: Take turns playing with the toy (9) Title reference: Licence to Kill
55b	31b	"Live and Be Polite"	Krista Tucker	January 25, 2012	232b
Wolfie trains Oso in Yucatan to retrieve a box filled with diamonds. The boxes look identical, confusing Oso. As a result, Oso gives Wolfie a box filled with bean bags and stuffed dolls which look like snakes, causing havoc outside the building. Oso helps a boy in Saskatchewan named Jordan learn how to be polite, which includes using the magic words: Please and Thank You. Step 1: Wait your turn Step 2: Say please Step 3: Say thank you (5) Title reference: Live and Let Die
56	32	"The Manny with the Golden Bear"	Written by : Krista Tucker; Story by : Ford Riley; John Loy	March 30, 2012	234
Oso is to deliver a briefcase to Professor Buffo who is on a submarine. In order to get there, Oso must use various vehicles. Dotty and Wolfie are on call if he needs help, but Oso thinks he can complete the mission by himself. But when he tries to land the Space Jet in the water, it sinks. That's what Paw Pilot calls in a special alert. A boy in Sheet Rock Hills named David wants to learn to ride a bike his cousin Nick gave him. However, his mother cannot teach him because of her broken foot and the bike is broken too. So, Oso and David call Handy Manny and his tools to help them and Oso fix the bike for Bike Day in the park. Oso learns a lesson about asking for help and working together. Step 1: Sit on the bike Step 2: Balance the bike while walking Step 3: Pedal and balance at the same time. Special Guest Stars: Wilmer Valderrama as Handy Manny, Dee Bradley Baker as Turner, Tom Kenny as Pat, Fred Stoller as Rusty, Nika Futterman as Stretch and Squeeze, Kath Soucie as Dusty, Grey DeLisle as Flicker, and Carlos Alazraqui as Felipe; Guest Stars: Nancy Truman as Kelly Title reference: The Man with the Golden Gun.
57a	33a	"Sock Puppet Royale"	Written by : John Loy; Story by : Krista Tucker	October 7, 2011	228a
Wolfie gives Oso a training assignment to camouflage Rapide with the Atacama desert sands using Professor Buffo's new sprayer. Oso covers Rapide with the spray, but not the top. Oso decides to help a girl in Peru named Lucia make a sock puppet to use in her brother, Mateo's puppet show. Step 1: Ask for a sock to use. Step 2: Make the puppet's face. Step 3: Use your hand to make a puppet's mouth move. (8) Title reference: Casino Royale
57b	33b	"Costume of Solace"	Written by : John Loy; Story by : Chris Nee	October 7, 2011	228b
Dotty trains Oso to escape from a flooding room of water without using any of his gadgets but a flotation vest. However, Oso gets trapped in a whirlpool. He decides to help a girl in Berlin named Lainey find what she needs to dress up like a princess for a tea party. Step 1: Find a pretty dress. Step 2: Add some jewelry. Step 3: Find a crown. (12) Title reference: Quantum of Solace
58a	34a	"Diamonds are for Baseball"	Krista Tucker	May 17, 2012	236a
Wolfie trains Oso to drive through an alley on two wheels, demonstrated to Oso by Dotty. However, while trying to do that, his car goes back to the normal way of driving, causing Oso to crash his car into the alley, leaving it stuck. That is when a special alert comes in from Ottawa. A boy named Adam wants to play tee-ball with his sister, Heather and her friends. However, Adam is not good at hitting a baseball off a tee yet. So it is up to Oso to help Adam hit a baseball off a tee before his sister, Heather and her friends come back to play tee-ball with him. Step 1: Step up to the plate. Step 2: Get in batting position. Step 3: Look at the ball and swing the bat. (9) Title reference: Diamonds Are Forever
58b	34b	"Tomorrow Never Ducks"	Krista Tucker	May 17, 2012	236b
Wolfie trains Oso to drive the speedboat to the dock on the other side of the bay. However, Oso forgets to go around a sandbar and instead goes through it, causing him to crash the boat into land. That is when a special alert comes in. Oso goes to Belize to helps a boy named Raphael and his three friends, Enrique, Eduardo, and Alicia play "Duck, duck, goose" before they head home. Step 1: Say "duck" as you walk around the circle tapping everyone's head. Step 2: Tap one person's head and say "goose". Step 3: Run around the circle to the open spot and sit down. (12) Title reference: Tomorrow Never Dies
59a	35a	"The Sitter Who Watched Me"	Krista Tucker	January 26, 2012	233a
Oso and the Special Agents are having a car race today. Everyone is geared up and ready to race but Oso leaves his car keys behind, causing the others to start racing without him. That is when Paw Pilot calls in a special alert. A british girl named Faith who lives in London, England is having a babysitter. Since her Aunt Sarah is not coming, a new babysitter named Amy Lou is coming to babysit her, who babysits her friend, Lisa. However, Faith is unsure if she is comfortable with her new babysitter, so Oso decides to help Faith feel comfortable just before her parents leave. Step 1: Meet the babysitter Step 2: Show her what you like to do Step 3: Say goodbye to mom and dad. Guest Star: Musa; Last appearance of: Rapide Title reference: The Spy Who Loved Me
59b	35b	"Potty Royale"	Written by : John Loy; Story by : Chris Nee	January 26, 2012	233b
Dotty trains Special Agent Oso to watch Wolfie walking to a hidden base in a pine forest, along with Musa, as quietly as they can. Oso shouts at Musa that Wolfie is approaching them, in which Wolfie catches Oso instead and then traps Oso in an automatic net. This is when a new assignment is introduced to Oso. A boy in Dortmund named Aiden wants to go to preschool like his brother Julian, but is told from his mom that preschool is not for little kids, and the only way to be a big kid is to go to the potty by himself. Aiden then tells his mom that he is willing to try, but he is not good at it yet. It is up to Oso to help Aiden use the potty all by himself so that Aiden can prove his mom that he is ready for preschool. Step 1: Ask yourself if you have to go Step 2: Find a bathroom and go Step 3: Wash your hands when you're done (6) Title reference: Casino Royale
60	36	"Thundersmall"	John Loy; Ford Riley	January 23, 2012	230
Dotty trains Oso to jump his car off a dock onto Wolfie's submarine, but--as always--Oso fails in his training exercise on his first try. After all, Oso is a special agent in training. Meanwhile, Professor Buffo has invented a new machine that shrinks things. After he tests the shrinking machine on Wolfie's motorcycle, Oso plays with it thinking it was a toy. Suddenly, Oso, Dotty, Wolfie, Professor Buffo and Whirly Bird get shrunk by Buffo's invention by mistakes, and chaos breaks out in the U.N.I.Q.U.E. Dome. Oso is on a mission to find a way to save himself and his friends in order to return to normal size, so that he will find what it takes to become a real special agent by earning a Titanium Medal of Confidence. Step 1: Find Wolfie and Dotty; Step 2: Bring them back to the lab Step 3: Use the Thundersmall Device to make everyone big again Title references Thunderball
