= Duck, duck, goose =

Children's chasing game

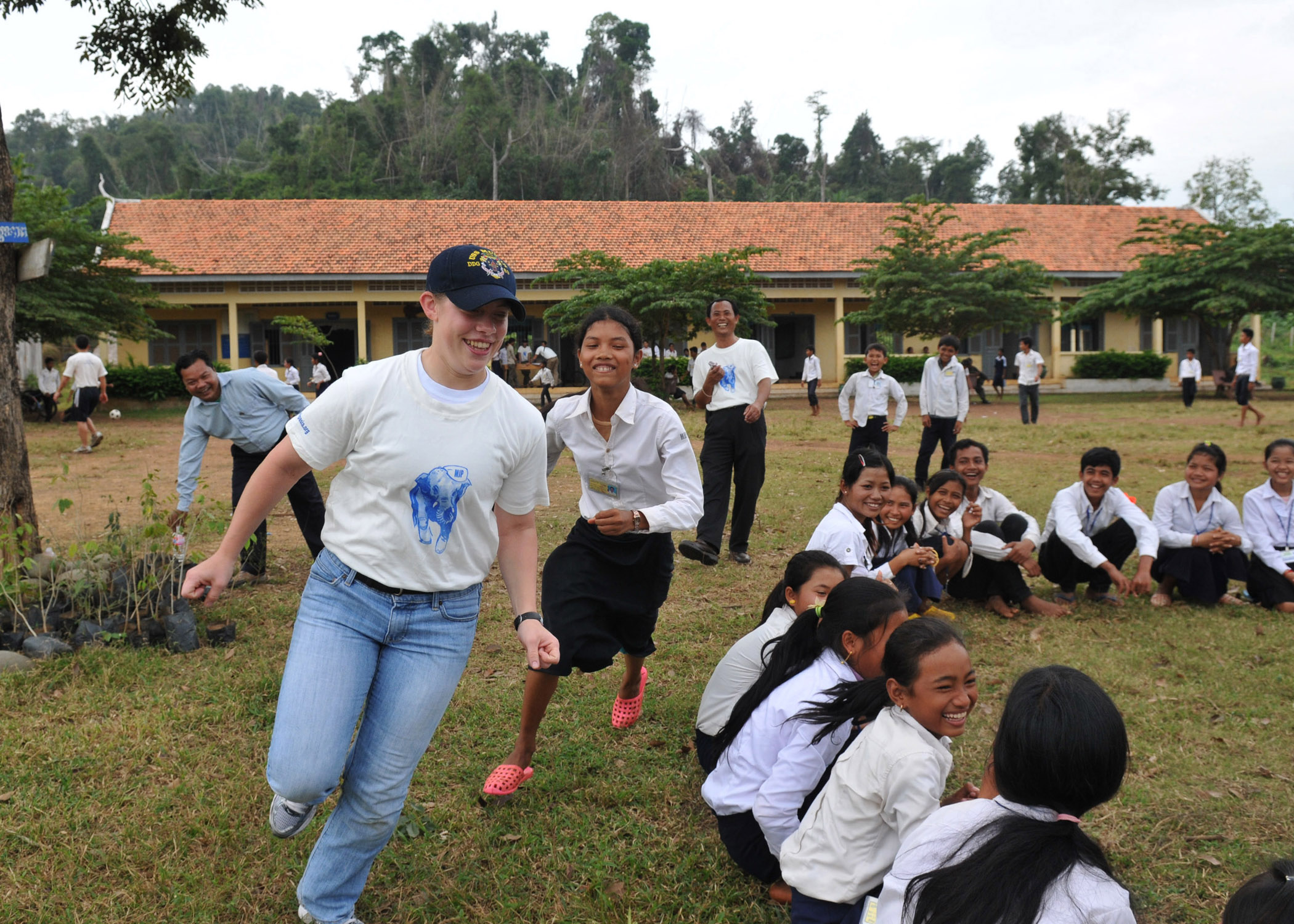
- People playing the game in Cambodia
- Players: 3+
- Skills: Running, chasing, logic, basic motor skills

Duck, duck, goose (also called duck, duck, gray duck or daisy in the dell) is a traditional children's game often first learned in preschool. The game may be later adapted on the playground for early elementary students. The object of this game is to walk in a circle, tapping on each player's head until one is finally chosen; the chosen player must then chase the picker to avoid becoming the next picker.

== Basic concept ==
A group of players sit in a circle, facing inward, while another player, who is "it", walks around tapping or pointing to each player in turn, calling each a "duck" until finally calling one a "goose", which designates the chosen player as the chaser. The chaser (goose) then stands and tries to tag the chasee (it), while the chasee tries to return to and sit where the chaser had been sitting before. If the chasee (it) succeeds, the chaser (goose) becomes the chasee and the process begins again. If the chaser (goose) tags the chasee (it), the chaser (goose) may return to their previous spot and the original chasee (it) restarts the process.

== Variations ==
There is at least one instance of the game in Australia called "Duck Duck Goose Goose" where players can be eliminated.

=== Kiss in the ring or drop handkerchief ===
In this version of the game, as described by the British folklorist Alice Gomme in 1894, the picker touches the shoulder of each person in the ring with a handkerchief saying "not you", "not you", until the picker reaches the desired chaser, places the handkerchief on the person's shoulder, and says "but you". The picker then runs around the outside of the circle pursued by the chaser. Once the chaser catches the picker, the chaser is entitled to lead the picker into the center of the ring and claim a kiss. The original picker then takes the chaser's place in the ring and the chaser becomes the picker for the next round. Gomme describes various regional variations: in Shropshire, the two players run in opposite directions and compete to be first to reach the starting point; around London, the chase weaves in and out under the clasped hands of the other people in the ring. Gomme describes Drop Handkerchief as a variant in which there is no kissing. She also connects it to similar games such as French Jackie and Cat after Mouse.

Gomme suggests that "'Kiss in the Ring' is probably a relic of the earliest form of marriage by choice or selection. The custom of dropping or sending a glove as a signal of a challenge may have been succeeded by the handkerchief in this game."

=== Daisy in the dell ===
A variation described in the 1919 book Entertaining Made Easy by Emily Rose Burt has children standing in a circle, joining hands. The daisy picker goes around the outside, saying "Daisy in the dell, I don't pick you … I do pick you."

=== Duck, duck, gray duck ===
"Duck, duck, gray duck" is a variation of the game played in much of Minnesota and some parts of Wisconsin. Instead of yelling "goose" to signal which player must chase the picker, the picker yells "gray duck!" or "duck, duck, gray duck!" The picker may call various colors or adjectives, such as saying "green duck, purple duck, yellow duck, gross duck, grape duck, gray duck!" In some regions and variations, the caller may change the direction in which they run.

=== Drip, drip, drop ===
"Drip, drip, drop" is another version of the game. One player who is "it" goes around the circle with a container of water and "drips" a small amount on each person's head. They will then select someone in the circle to "drop" the entire container on top of them. This player will then try to tag the "it" before the "it" sits in the spot of the person who got "dropped" on. If "it" is tagged then they will remain "it" for another round.

== See also ==
- Kagome Kagome (a related Japanese game)
- Kho kho (a related Indian game)
- Leapfrog
- Mother may I?
- Musical chairs
- Poor Mary
- Red light, green light
- Simon Says
