= Diane Bell (anthropologist) =

Australian writer and anthropologist

- Born: 1943 (age 82–83); Melbourne, Australia
- Education: Frankston Teachers College; Monash University (BA); Australian National University (PhD)
- Notable work: Ngarrindjeri Wurruwarrin (1998); Daughters of the Dreaming (1983, 1993, 2002); Generations (1987)

Diane Robin Bell OAM (born 1943) is an Australian feminist anthropologist, author, and social justice advocate. Her work focuses on the Aboriginal people of Australia, Indigenous land rights, human rights, Indigenous religions, environmental issues, and feminist theory and practice.

Bell has undertaken fieldwork in central and southeastern Australia and in North America; and held senior positions in higher education in Australia and the USA. In 2005, after 17 years in the United States, she returned to Australia, and worked on a number of projects in South Australia. As of 2025 she is Professor Emerita of Anthropology at the George Washington University in Washington, D.C., U.S., Distinguished Honorary Professor of Anthropology at the Australian National University, Canberra.

Her books include Daughters of the Dreaming (1983/1993/2002); Generations: Grandmothers, mothers, and daughters (1987); Law: The old and the new (1980/1984); and Ngarrindjeri Wurruwarrin: A world that is, was, and will be (1998/2014). Evil: A novel (2005) was adapted to a play.

== Early life and education ==
Diane Robin Bell was born in 1943 in Melbourne, Victoria.

After leaving school at the age of 16, she trained as a primary school teacher at Frankston Teachers College (1960-1) and taught in a range of state schools in Victoria and New South Wales between 1962 and 1970.

After the birth of her children, Genevieve (1967) and Morgan (1969), she completed high school through night classes at Box Hill High School, Victoria (1970-1), her BA (Hons) in Anthropology at Monash University (1975), and a PhD from Australian National University (ANU) (1981).

== Career ==
In 1981, Bell worked for the newly-established Northern Territory Aboriginal Sacred Sites Protection Authority; set up her own anthropological consultancy in Canberra (1982-8); consulted for the Central Land Council, the Northern Land Council, Aboriginal Legal Aid Services, the Australian Law Reform Commission, and the Aboriginal Land Commissioner. Her academic posts included Research Fellow at the ANU (1983-6), and then as the Chair of Australian Studies at Deakin University in Geelong, where she was the first female professor on staff.

In 1989, Bell moved to the United States to take up the Chair of Religion, Economic Development and Social Justice endowed by the Henry R. Luce Foundation, at the College of the Holy Cross in Worcester, Massachusetts.

In 1999, she took up the position of Director of Women's Studies and Professor of Anthropology at the George Washington University (GWU) in Washington, D.C. As the recipient of a fellowship in 2003–4, awarded by the peak educational body, the American Council on Education, Bell also worked closely with the senior administration of Virginia Tech as they revised their curriculum.

On her retirement from GWU in 2005 she was awarded the title "Professor Emerita of Anthropology". On her return to Australia in 2005, she was appointed writer and editor in residence at Flinders University, and visiting professor, School of Social Sciences at the University of Adelaide.

As of December 2024 she is Emerita Professor at the ANU

== Anthropological work ==
Bell's first full-length anthropological monograph was Daughters of the Dreaming, which focused on the religious, spiritual and ceremonial lives of Aboriginal women in central Australia. The book has been in continuous print since its first publication in 1983 and subsequent editions in 1993 and 2002 engage with the debates the work stimulated. It is now well-established practice to have women's councils as part of the decision-making and consultative structures in Aboriginal affairs. Through her research and in giving expert evidence, Bell has been able to demonstrate that Aboriginal women are owners and managers of land in their own right.

In 1986, Melbourne publishers McPhee Gribble, with Bell as author, won the competitive tender from the Australian Bicentennial Authority (ABA) to write a book about women in Australia for the 1988 Bicentenary. The book Generations: Grandmothers, Mothers and Daughters traces ways in which significant objects in the lives of Australian women have been passed from generation to generation and explores how stories of the objects forge links with female kin. Bell used an ethnographic approach to explore the commonalities of Australian women's cultures across age, time, race and region. Shortly after it was published, the book reached number one on The Age bestseller list for works of non-fiction.

Throughout the latter part of the 1970s, and through most of the 1980s, Bell was involved in issues about Aboriginal land rights and law reform. With lawyer Pam Ditton, she authored Law: the old and the new. Aboriginal Women in Central Australia Speak Out (1980/1984), which addressed issues of law reform in Central Australia, in the wake of the passage of the Northern Territory Land Rights Act 1976. Bell worked on some 10 land claims for the Central Land Council, the Northern Land Council and the then Aboriginal Land Commissioner, Justice Toohey.

In the late 1990s, Bell was drawn into the Hindmarsh Island bridge controversy. In 1994, a group of Ngarrindjeri women, traditional owners of the Lower River Murray, Lakes Alexandrina, and Lake Albert and the Coorong (South Australia) had objected that a proposal to build a bridge from Goolwa to Kumarangk (Hindmarsh Island) near the Murray mouth would desecrate sites sacred to them as women. The gender-restricted knowledge that underwrote their claim became known as "secret women's business", and was contested in the media, courts, and academy. In 1996, a South Australian Royal Commission found that the women had deliberately fabricated their beliefs to thwart the development. However, with one exception, the women who claimed knowledge of the sacred tradition did not give evidence at the Royal Commission because they considered it to be a violation of their religious freedoms.

In 1997, in the Federal Court of Australia, the developers sought compensation for the losses incurred by the delays in the building of the bridge. Mr. Justice von Doussa, heard from all parties to the dispute and, although the court had been informed that the case would not be a rerun of the Royal Commission, the matter of restricted women's knowledge recurred such that 'late in the trial the applicants amended their pleadings to specifically allege that the restricted women's knowledge, which they refer to as "women's business", was not a genuine Ngarrindjeri tradition'. In his 'Reasons for Decision' of August 2001, von Doussa noted 'the evidence received by the Court on this topic is significantly different to that which was before the Royal Commission. Upon the evidence before this Court I am not satisfied that the restricted women's knowledge was fabricated or that it was not part of genuine Aboriginal tradition'. As to Ngarrindjeri key witness, Doreen Kartinyeri, he wrote, "I am not persuaded that I should reject Dr. Kartinyeri's evidence and find that she has lied about the restricted women's business".

On 4 May 2009, "The Meeting of the Waters", the site complex the Ngarrindjeri women had sought to protect through the courts, was registered by the Government of South Australia. On 6 July 2010, on behalf of the SA Government, Paul Caica, Minister for Aboriginal Affairs, acknowledged Von Doussa's Decision that Ngarrindjeri knowledge was a genuine part of Aboriginal tradition and apologised for the great pain and hurt to the community.

Bell became involved in this matter of gender-restricted knowledge after the Royal Commission. On the basis of her research in the SA archives and fieldwork with the women in 1996–8, Bell was convinced there was sufficient evidence to support the women's claims that there was gender-restricted knowledge in Ngarrindjeri society and that the women had told the truth. Bell's subsequent monograph, Ngarrindjeri Wurruwarrin (1998/2014), was acclaimed. From 2005 to 2013, Bell lived on Ngarrindjeri lands as she researched and wrote the Connection Report for their Native Title Claim.

== Writing ==
Bell is the author/editor of 10 books and numerous articles and book chapters dealing with religion, land rights, law reform, art, history, feminist theory and practice, and social change.

Bell's first published novel, Evil, addresses secrets within the Roman Catholic church and is set on the campus of a fictional American liberal arts college. Adapted by Leslie Jacobson to a play, Evil was performed for the "From Page to Stage" season on new plays at the Kennedy Center, Washington, D.C., USA, 2006 and in Adelaide, 2008. Bell's play "Weaving and Whispers" was performed at the TarraWarra Museum of Arts Biennial in 2014.

== Politics ==
Bell ran as an independent candidate in the 2008 Mayo by-election, caused by the resignation of former foreign minister and Liberal leader Alexander Downer. Her campaign was called Vote4Di and was supported by a campaign website. South Australian independent Senator Nick Xenophon gave support to Bell's campaign. In a field of eleven candidates and the absence of a Labor candidate, Bell finished third on a 16.3 percent primary vote, behind the Greens on 21.4 (+10.4) percent and the Liberals on 41.3 (–9.8) percent. The seat became marginal for the Liberals on a 53.0 (–4.0) two-candidate vote.

== River advocate ==
Bell campaigned for fresh water flows for the River Murray, Lakes Alexandrina and Albert and the Coorong. In 2007, she was a co-founder of the 'StoptheWeir' website and worked with the River, Lakes and Coorong Action Group Inc to stop the construction of a weir across the River Murray at Pomanda Island (at the point where the river enters Lake Alexandrina). She administered the "Hurry Save The Murray" website and has been a frequent speaker and commentator on environmental matters online, in the media and in preparing submissions and giving evidence to various environmental inquiries.

== Other activities and roles ==
Bell served on the board of trustees for Hampshire College for eight years.

She has served on the editorial boards of several journals (Aboriginal History 1979–1988; Women's Studies International Forum 1990–2005) and was the Australian contributing member of the international editorial board for the Longmans Encyclopedia (1989) Macmillan, the Encyclopedia of World Religions (2005) and the Encyclopedia of Religion in Australia (2009), Cambridge University Press.

Bell was a contributing consultant to National Geographic on their Taboo TV series (2002-4).

== Recognition and awards ==
- 1999: Ngarrindjeri Wurruwarrin (1998), winner, NSW Premier's Gleebooks Prize for Critical Writing in the NSW Premier's Literary Awards
- 1999: Ngarrindjeri Wurruwarrin, shortlisted for The Age Book of the Year
- 2000: Ngarrindjeri Wurruwarrin, finalist, Australian Literature Society Gold Medal
- 2021: Medal of the Order of Australia, for "service to literature" in the 2021 Queen's Birthday Honours
- 2023: Hazel Rowley Literary Fellowship

== Works ==
=== As author ===
- Evil: A novel Spinifex Press, Melbourne, 2005
- Ngarrindjeri Wurruwarrin: A world that is, was, and will be Spinifex Press, Melbourne, 1998 (New edition 2014)
- Generations: Grandmothers, Mothers and Daughters Melbourne, Penguin, 1987, with photographs by Ponch Hawke.
- Daughters of the Dreaming, First ed. Melbourne, McPheeGribble/Sydney, Allen and Unwin, 1983 (Second ed. Minneapolis, University of Minnesota Press 1993; Third ed. Melbourne, Spinifex Press 2002)
- Law: The Old and the New (with Pam Ditton) Aboriginal History, Canberra, 1980

=== As editor ===
- Kungun Ngarrindjeri Miminar Yunnan: Listen to Ngarrindjeri Women Speaking Melbourne, Spinifex Press, 2008 (in collaboration with Ngarrindjeri women
- All about Water: All about the River (co-edited with Gloria Jones for the River, Lakes and Coorong Action Group, www.stoptheweir.com)
- Radically Speaking: Feminism Reclaimed (Contributing co-editor with Renate Klein) Spinifex Press, Melbourne, 1996
- Gendered Fields: Women, Men and Ethnography (Contributing co-editor with Pat Caplan and Wazir Karim) Routledge, London, 1993
- This is My Story: The Use of Oral Sources (Contributing co-editor Shelley Schreiner) Centre for Australian Studies, Deakin University, Geelong, 1990
- Longman's Encyclopedia (Australian Contributing Editor) Longmans, 1989
- Religion in Aboriginal Australia (Contributing co-editor with Max Charlesworth, Kenneth Maddock and Howard Morphy) University of Queensland Press, St Lucia, 1984

=== As reviewer ===
- Miles Franklin and the Serbs still matter: a review essay, Honest History, 1 December 2015
- Sex, soldiers and the South Pacific, Honest History, 8 February 2016
- An anthropologist, an historian and his historians, Honest History, 26 October 2016
- Clare Wright's You Daughters of Freedom is a Big Book about Big Ideas, Honest History, 7 October 2018
- Read and savour the salt of Bruce Pascoe's stories and essays of our land, Honest History, 1 November 2019
