= Poor Jenny =

Poor Jenny may refer to:

- Poor Jenny (film), a 1912 German silent film
- Poor Jenny (song), a 1959 song by The Everly Brothers
- An alternate name for the nursery rhyme Poor Mary
- An alternate name for the song The Saga of Jenny
