= Piano Concerto No. 1 (Shostakovich) =

Concerto by Dmitri Shostakovich

Piano Concerto
- No. 1
- by Dmitri Shostakovich
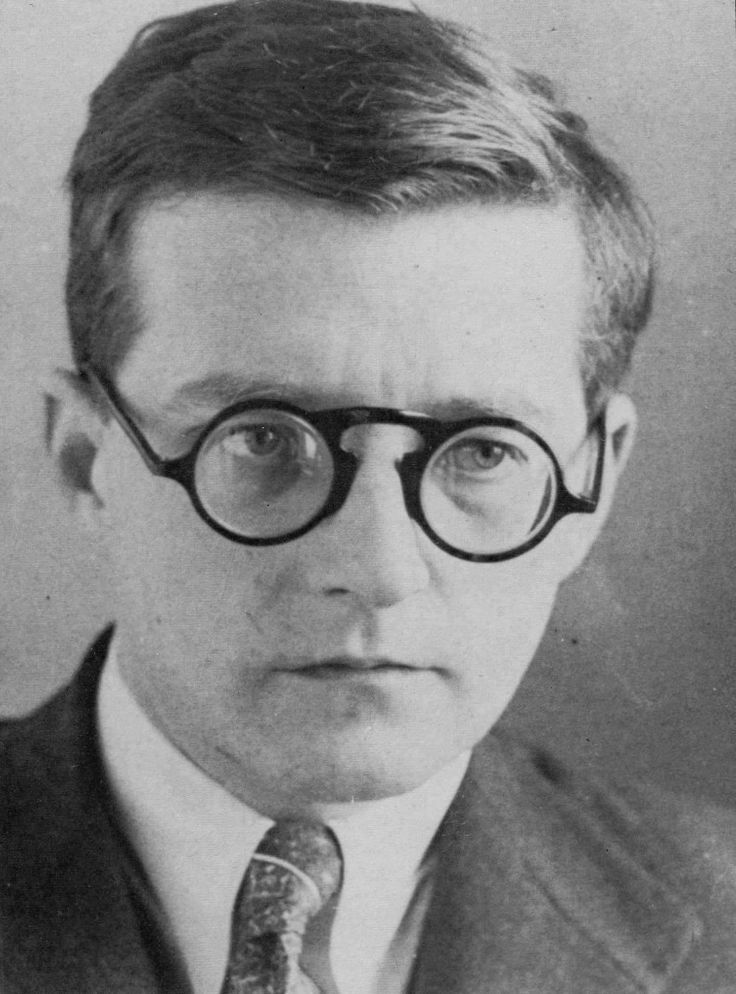
- Shostakovich before 1941
- Key: C minor
- Opus: 35
- Composed: 1933
- Performed: 15 October 1933
- Movements: 3
- Scoring: piano; trumpet; string orchestra

The Concerto in C minor for Piano, Trumpet, and String Orchestra, Op. 35, was completed by Dmitri Shostakovich in 1933.

The concerto was premiered on 15 October 1933 in the season opening concerts of the Leningrad Philharmonic Orchestra with Shostakovich at the piano, Fritz Stiedry conducting, and Alexander Schmidt playing the trumpet solos. "By all accounts, Shostakovich played brilliantly" and the concerto was well received. The performance was repeated on 17 October.

== Classification ==
Despite the title, the work might be classified as a double concerto rather than a piano concerto, in which the trumpet and piano command equal prominence. The trumpet parts assume equal importance during the conclusion of the last movement, immediately after the cadenza for piano solo. Years after he wrote the work, Shostakovich recalled that he had initially planned to write a concerto for trumpet and orchestra and then added the piano to make it a double concerto. As he continued writing, it became a piano concerto with a solo trumpet.

== Arrangement for two pianos ==
After writing the orchestral version, Shostakovich wrote an arrangement for two pianos (without orchestra or trumpet). In the two-piano version, the solo piano part is more elaborate. The metronome indications and tempo markings of the two-piano arrangement differ from those of the orchestral version.

== Structure ==
The concerto comprises either three or four movements, depending on the interpretation:

1. Allegro moderato
2. Lento
3. Moderato
4. Allegro con brio

The Moderato is sometimes seen as an introductory passage to the Allegro con brio rather than as a separate movement. However, it is usually considered to be the third of four movements, as the moods of the two are very different. Some recordings feature only three movements, with the last marked as Moderato – Allegro con brio. The concerto is concluded by a brief cadenza, with the strings reentering to build tension near the finish. The movement comes to a close with short C Major bursts of the strings and piano, accompanied by the trumpet.

== Incorporation of other classical works and folk tunes ==
Robert Matthew-Walker wrote of this work:

With such a polyglot collection of quotations and influences, only a composer of genius could have moulded this variety into a cohesive whole. The miracle is that Shostakovich succeeded, and constructed a distinctive and indestructible work...

He also noted that the concerto contains a strong element of parody, beginning with a reference to Beethoven's "Appassionata" Sonata, and ending with "an uproarious quotation" of Beethoven's "Rage Over a Lost Penny" and a slice of Haydn's D major Piano Sonata. The last movement's final cadenza is introduced with exactly the same trill as in the final bars of Beethoven's cadenza for his Piano Concerto No. 3. The work also includes quotations from Shostakovich's own Hamlet incidental music, Op. 32a, and from a revue, Hypothetically Murdered, Op. 31.

Shostakovich also quotes the Austrian folk song "O du lieber Augustin".

The trumpet solo in the nine bars starting one bar after rehearsal mark 63 is identical to the melody of the folk tune "Poor Mary" (aka "Poor Jenny").

== Recordings ==
There are numerous recordings of the orchestral version of the concerto, including several with Shostakovich at the piano; he repeatedly played the concerto.
