= Leslie Jacobson =

American dramatist

- Occupations: Professor emeritus of theatre, playwright, director, and artistic director
- Known for: Founding artistic director of the longest-running women's theatre in the United States

Leslie Bravman Jacobson is a George Washington University professor emeritus of theatre, playwright, director, and the founding artistic director of the longest-running women's theatre in the United States, Horizons: Theatre from a Woman's Perspective in Washington, D.C. She was also a founder and vice president of the 501(c)(3) not-for-profit Bokamoso Youth Foundation, president of the League of Washington Theatres, and recipient of a Fulbright Senior Research Fellowship.

== Early life ==
Jacobson's paternal great-grandfather was a rabbi. He raised his family in a small town in Lithuania. His son, Jacobson's grandfather, would eventually come to live in New Jersey, where he worked at a women's shoe factory. He later raised a family in Brooklyn, New York; one of his children, Jacobson's father, went on to attend Harvard Law School as well as enlist in the U.S. Army. Jacobson's mother was an informal jazz pianist whose love of music was passed down to Jacobson and her brother; Jacobson sang in her high school choir and continued in choir when attending Northwestern University.

== Education ==
Jacobson graduated cum laude from Northwestern University with a degree in theatre. She earned her Master of Fine Art in Directing from Boston University’s School for the Arts. In 2001, Jacobson graduated from a program at Leadership America.

== Career ==
Jacobson began her career at George Washington University in 1976.

In 1977, Jacobson helped establish Pro Femina Theatre, later called Horizons: Theatre from a Woman's Perspective, in Washington, D.C. At various points, the theatre was the recipient of federal funds from the National Endowment for the Arts. Jacobson produced plays by and about women for 30 years. Throughout the three decades, Jacobson fully produced 60 new plays and playwrights and an additional 50 through staged readings. Works included Close Calls/Far Cries, Mother, May I?; Nancy Drew, Girl Detective; Miss Lulu Bett; Club Horizons: Masquerade; Top Girls; Lee Blessing's Eleemosynary; and My Name Is Alice. The theatre company occupied a variety of spaces throughout its tenure, including a historic parish hall space in Georgetown.

From 1985–1986, Jacobson served as the president of the League of Washington Theatres. In 1986, she was nominated for the Helen Hayes Award in the category of Outstanding Director. In 1988, she was the recipient of the Helen Hayes Award for Outstanding Resident Musical for A...My Name Is Alice. Around the same time, she was listed in Who's Who of American Theatre. 1n 1989, she was nominated for another Helen Hayes Award, this time in the category of Outstanding Director.

Jacobson served as Chair of the Department of Theatre and Dance at George Washington University for 13 years, from 1995 to 2008, and taught at the university for 42 years. During this time, she helped create the one-year intensive MFA program in Classical Acting, over which she presided as Director of Graduate Studies, and the Women's Leadership Program in International Arts and Culture. She also originated new courses, including "Theatre for Social Change." In addition, she served as an affiliate faculty member at the university's Honey W. Nashman Center for Civic Engagement & Public Service and chair of the Faculty Learning Community on Community Engagement and the Arts.

In 2003, Jacobson began collaborating with Roy Barber to create eight music and theatre pieces with at-risk youth from the Bokamoso Youth Centre in the impoverished rural township of Winterveldt, South Africa. The works addressed issues the youth were facing, ranging from the HIV/AIDS crisis and family violence to teen pregnancy. Since 2003, 12 youth from Winterveldt have been selected to travel to Washington, D.C. perform. In the process, they have helped raise scholarship funds for themselves and their peers. Additionally, students from Jacobson's department at George Washington University have traveled to Winterveldt to work with the youth there. To complement the program, Jacobson established the 501(c)(3) not-for-profit Bokamoso Youth Foundation, serving as its vice president.

Throughout her career, Jacobson directed many theatre works, from those at George Washington University such as Thornton Wilder's The Skin of Our Teeth to those at Horizons: Theatre from a Woman's Perspective such as Close Calls/Far Cries, and a number of works at D.C. theatre companies and regional theatres in Colorado, Massachusetts, Georgia, and Maryland.

== Retirement ==
Jacobson retired from George Washington University in 2019 after 42 years of service. Preceding a reception was a performance of Women's Works, a selection of works by Jacobson. The post-performance soiree took place at the Arts Club of Washington. She was recognized for her dedication to utilizing theatre as a "catalyst for social change," illuminating through her own works, as well as the works of others she chose to produce, social issues such as gender inequality, domestic violence, and the immigrant experience. A number of her many accomplishments were noted, such as the workshops she held at the homeless advocacy organization, Street Sense, and the student exchange program she started with South Africa's Bokamoso Youth Centre. In addition, her peers and students acknowledged her "warmth," "love of teaching," and nurturing spirit.

== Personal life ==
Jacobson is married to Lou Jacobson. The couple have two daughters, Becky and Rachel.

== Select dramatic works ==
- Migratory Tales (2018)
- Vanishing Point (2009)
- The Body Project (2005)
- I Want to Tell You (1999)
- Strangers In Their Own Land (1992)

== Other writings ==
- "Myriam, Morocco, My Mother, Me — And George Gershwin," Huffington Post (2017)
- "Grandpa Was a Draft Dodger," Huffington Post (2017)
- "People of Faith," Huffington Post (2015)

== Awards and recognition ==
- Fulbright Senior Research Fellowship recipient (2008)
- Recipient of the Helen Hayes Award for Outstanding Resident Musical (1988)
- Three-time nominee for the Helen Hayes Award in the category of Outstanding Director (1986, 1988, 1989)
- Chosen by the Historian of the U.S. Senate to write, direct, and produce a play commemorating the 200th anniversary of the Senate. (1989)
