= Special Agent Oso season 1 =

Special Agent Oso
- Season 1
- No. of episodes: 24

Release
- Original network: Disney Channel; Playhouse Disney; Disney Junior (all)
- Original release: April 4, 2009 – April 17, 2010

Series chronology
- Next → Season 2

The first season of Special Agent Oso aired from April 4, 2009, to April 17, 2010 on Playhouse Disney.

== Episodes ==
No. overall	No. in season	Title	Written by	Original release date	Prod. code
1a	1a	"To Grandma with Love"	Ford Riley	April 4, 2009	101a
While Oso is practicing climbing on Mount Aconcagua in Mendoza, Argentina, he slips off the rope and rolls down the snowy mountain and ends up as a snowball as Paw Pilot calls in a special alert from Northern Quebec. A girl named Stacey loses the card she has made for Grandma's birthday, and it is up to Oso to help her look for it and send it in the mailbox before the mail truck arrives. Step 1: Find the envelope Step 2: Put a stamp on the envelope Step 3: Put the envelope in the mailbox (10) Titles reference From Russia with Love
1b	1b	"Gold Flower"	Silvia Olivas	April 4, 2009	101b
Oso receives a special alert while practicing walking in space and getting tangled in his space tether. He helps a girl in Northern Quebec named Molly plant yellow marigold flowers in her garden before her mother gets home. Step 1: Get yellow marigold seeds Step 2: Plant the seeds in the dirt Step 3: Water the planted seeds (8) The Gold Flower clip is used in the BLAM! episodes, Snow Mountain Climbing and Space Walking. Titles reference Goldfinger
2a	2a	"Never Say No Brushing Again"	Krista Tucker	April 4, 2009	102a
Oso is being trained by Dotty to insert a device that helps to make the space jet fly smoothly again. However, when a special alert is called from Naples, Oso takes a break from his training mission to help a boy named Danny brush his teeth before his mom reads him a bedtime story. Step 1: Put toothpaste on the toothbrush Step 2: Make circles on your teeth with the brush Step 3: Rinse your mouth with water (6) Titles reference Never Say Never Again
2b	2b	"The Girl with the Golden Book"	Noelle Wright	April 4, 2009	102b
While Oso is doing one of his training missions, a puzzle, he pushes a button that sets off an alarm and goes up a trap tube and out of the U.N.I.Q.U.E Dome when he gets a special alert. Oso helps a girl named Samantha fix a torn book page before her mom reads her the story. Step 1: Find the right tape for the job Step 2: Put the ripped pieces together Step 3: Tape the page together (5) Titles reference The Man with the Golden Gun
3a	3a	"Live and Jump Rope"	Krista Tucker	April 5, 2009	103a
While Oso practices jumping laser beams, Paw Pilot calls in a special alert then he sets off the alarms and gets launched into his car. He helps a girl in Lamu named Abby jump rope before her friend Sally arrives for a playdate. Step 1: Put the jump rope behind your feet Step 2: Swing the rope over your head, then jump when it gets to your feet Step 3: Keep swinging the rope and jumping (10) Titles reference Live and Let Die
3b	3b	"A View to a Kitten"	Sean Diviny	April 5, 2009	103b
Oso tumbles down a sand dune and into a camel’s water hole after he receives a special alert while looking for a hidden plane in the Sahara Desert. A boy in Exmouth named Aaron is having trouble with his mother's camera, so Oso helps him take a picture of his kitten before his mother finishes making fruit salad. Step 1: Turn the camera on Step 2: Point the camera Step 3: Press the button to take the picture (11) Titles reference A View to a Kill
4a	4a	"A View to a Book"	Ford Riley	April 6, 2009	104a
As Agent Wolfie gives Oso a driving lesson, he receives a special assignment after crashing into a haystack. Oso helps a boy named Joe check out a library book about dinosaurs before the library closes, while his mother is making dinner. He is bringing one of his dinosaurs to show and tell tomorrow. Step 1: Go to the library Step 2: Find the dinosaur book Step 3: Check out the book using a library card (8) Titles reference A View to a Kill
4b	4b	"Diamonds are for Kites"	Brian Swenlin	April 6, 2009	104b
Oso gets a special assignment while being trained to cross a bridge with a green flag to raise it on the other side of the ravine in the Arctic National Wildlife Refuge. He helps a girl named Sarah fly her kite during Kite Day in the park. Step 1: Get a kite Step 2: Tie string to the kite Step 3: Use the wind to make the kite fly (10) Titles reference Diamonds Are Forever
5a	5a	"The Boy with the Golden Gift"	John Loy	April 7, 2009	105a
As Oso tries to figure out a mystery picture, a special assignment is delivered and he gets trapped in one of the lockers. He helps a boy named Michael wrap a present for his friend Quinn's birthday before he leaves for the party. Step 1: Find wrapping paper Step 2: Fold and tape it around the present Step 3: Put a bow on the wrapped gift (10) Titles reference The Man with the Golden Gun
5b	5b	"Birthdays are Forever"	Ford Riley	April 7, 2009	105b
While Oso tries fixing the air brakes on his special agent train, he fails and the train speeds past a barrier and splashes into a river when he gets a special assignment from Casablanca to help a boy named Quinn make a party hat for his birthday picture after he gave the last one to his baby cousin, Madison. Step 1: Fold a paper circle in half Step 2: Shape the paper into a cone Step 3: Decorate the hat (13) Titles reference Diamonds Are Forever
6a	6a	"Carousel Royale"	Noelle Wright	April 8, 2009	106a
Oso is being trained to load a statue onto his train when a special alert is called. A girl named Cassie has lost her ticket to ride the carousel and it has fallen under the boardwalk. So, Oso must help her find her lost ticket before the last carousel ride of the day starts. Step 1: Find the lost ticket Step 2: Pick a horse to ride Step 3: Climb up onto the horse (7) Titles reference Casino Royale
6b	6b	"Leaf Raker"	John Loy	April 8, 2009	106b
While Oso sees how well he does without any of his gadgets, a special alert is called. Oso helps a boy named Dawson rake the leaves in his front yard before the recycling truck comes. Step 1: Find a rake Step 2: Rake the leaves into piles Step 3: Put the piles into a leaf bin (9) Titles reference Moonraker
7a	7a	"Thunder Berries"	John Loy	April 9, 2009	107a
As Oso paints his motorcycle with invisibility paint for his training exercise, he accidentally gets some on Rapide when he receives a special alert from Los Angeles County. He helps a girl named Grace pick strawberries on a farm for her family lunch, before the lunch is served. Step 1: Find red, ripe strawberries Step 2: Pull them off their stems Step 3: Wash them well (8) Titles reference Thunderball
7b	7b	"Flowers are Forever"	Noelle Wright	April 9, 2009	107b
Oso is learning how to fly his space jet when a special alert is called from Pismo Beach. He helps a girl named Caroline pick wildflowers for homework before she, her mother and baby sister Morgan leave for home. Step 1: Find wildflowers Step 2: Pick the wildflowers on the list Step 3: Press them in a book (15) Titles reference Diamonds Are Forever
8a	8a	"For Your Nice Bunny"	Brian Swenlin	April 10, 2009	108a
Oso is trying to get an envelope out of a building while avoiding puppies who are after him in hot pursuit when a special alert is called and the puppies catch him. He helps two kids named Jim and Mia bring the bunny before they leave for school. Step 1: Cover the cage floor with newspaper Step 2: Add hay and water Step 3: Put the bunny in the cage (14) Titles reference For Your Eyes Only
8b	8b	"For Pancakes with Love"	Holly Huckins	April 10, 2009	108b
Oso is in space replacing the solar panels of a tracking satellite when he receives a special assignment from Casablanca. He helps a girl named Olivia, who is going to make fresh-made pancakes for breakfast, measure out the ingredients, and stir the batter up before her grandparents arrive for breakfast. Step 1: Find a bowl and spoon Step 2: Measure the ingredients Step 3: Mix until the batter's smooth (8) Titles reference From Russia with Love
9a	9a	"License to Clean"	John Loy	April 11, 2009	109a
As Oso goes in a dark cave at Big Bend National Park in search of a red jewel, and a special alert is called as he falls and ends up dangling from a ravine. A boy named Jake has trouble finding his soccer shoes, and his room is a mess. So it is up to Oso to help him clean his messy room before he goes to soccer. Step 1: Put the books on their shelves Step 2: Put the toys in their boxes Step 3: Put the clothes in their drawers (10) Titles reference Licence to Kill
9b	9b	"On Her Cousin's Special Salad"	Brian Swenlin	April 11, 2009	109b
Oso dives into the sea to find a submarine, but gets tangled in seaweed as he receives a special alert. He helps a girl named Jade prepare a salad for her cousin Rachel who has food allergies, by washing, chopping, and tossing the vegetables. Step 1: Wash the vegetables Step 2: Chop the vegetables Step 3: Toss the salad (10) Titles reference On Her Majesty's Secret Service
10a	10a	"Hide Another Day"	Jack Monaco	April 13, 2009	110a
Oso is in training to take apart his grappling hook pen and put it back together blindfolded. He tries to find the top of it when he receives a special alert and then he ends up getting dressed in scuba gear by a robotic arm. He helps a boy in Euskadi named David play hide and go seek with his cousins, Jess, Ben, and Nathan, before they have to go home. Step 1: Close your eyes Step 2: Count to 20; Step 3: Find the other players (15) Titles reference Die Another Day
10b	10b	"Live and Let Dry"	John Loy	April 13, 2009	110b
As Oso gets trained to paddle a kayak down a river, he falls down a waterfall as he receives a special alert from San Diego. A boy named Logan needs to wash and dry dishes, since his mom is getting ready for her day, but he does not know how yet. So Oso must help Logan wash the dishes before he leaves for school. Step 1: Scrub the dishes Step 2: Rinse the soap off the dishes Step 3: Dry the dishes (6) Titles reference Live and Let Die
11a	11a	"Dr. Off"	Ford Riley	April 18, 2009	111a
A special alert is called as Oso searches for a hidden tunnel in Albuquerque. He helps a girl in Fortaleza named Addison save power and water, by turning off all unused lights, TVs, and faucets before family game night starts. Step 1: Turn off lights in empty rooms Step 2: Turn off faucets not being used Step 3: Turn off TVs that aren't being watched (15) Titles reference Dr. No
11b	11b	"License to Dress"	Krista Tucker	April 18, 2009	111b
While Oso trains to swim across a lagoon to Wolfie’s Boat for a party while having his scuba gear over his tuxedo for a training assignment, he receives a special alert after he gets his tuxedo all wet after he forgets to zip up the zipper of the wetsuit. He helps a boy named Frank get dressed for school, and Oso learns to get dressed by himself as well. Step 1: Put on a shirt Step 2: Put on pants Step 3: Put on socks and shoes (8) Titles reference License to Kill
12a	12a	"Octo Puzzle"	Brian Swenlin	April 25, 2009	112a
While Oso is out on the top of a tall tower looking for a red sports car, a special alert is called. A boy named Jack is trying to put together a jigsaw puzzle of an octopus to show his dad when he comes home, but he is having trouble doing so. So Oso must help Jack sort out the pieces and put the puzzle together before his dad comes home from work. Step 1: Sort the pieces Step 2: Build the outside of the puzzle Step 3: Build the inside of the puzzle (15) Titles reference Octopussy
12b	12b	"One Suitcase is Now Enough"	John Loy	April 25, 2009	112b
While Oso tries unlocking a high-security lock that opens a door to a room full of special gadgets, he receives a special alert after he falls through a trapdoor and goes down a slide and all the way outside to a pool of ping-pong balls. Oso helps a boy in Puducherry named Cody, who is having a vacation at the beach, pack a suitcase before he and his family leave for the airport. Step 1: Pick out what to take Step 2: Pack it neatly in the suitcase Step 3: Zip the suitcase shut (7) Titles reference The World Is Not Enough
13a	13a	"Three Wheels are Not Enough"	Phil Harnage	May 2, 2009	113a
Oso is in space on a training mission to close the space door tight, but he accidentally opens the door and floats out into space. He is then called to help a boy in Northern Territory named Paulie, fix his wagon's broken wheel so he can get birthday party supplies to his friend Julia's house. Step 1: Find the missing wheel and nut Step 2: Put the wheel and nut back on Step 3: Tighten the nut so the wheel won't come off (14) Titles reference The World Is Not Enough
13b	13b	"A Zoo to a Thrill"	Brian Swenlin	May 2, 2009	113b
Paw Pilot calls in a special alert as Oso looks for a disc hidden behind a painting. At a county fair, Oso helps a girl named Joon-Kim feed a llama at a petting zoo before the fair closes. Step 1: Get llama food Step 2: Wait your turn in line Step 3: Feed the llama (6) Titles reference A View to a Kill
14a	14a	"The Girl Who Cheered Me"	Jack Monaco	May 16, 2009	114a
As Oso tries transporting a package from his train to his helicopter, Paw Pilot calls in a special alert from Santa Cruz. A girl named Maria wants to do the team cheer to help her sister Josie's team, the Gators, only she has trouble doing so. So Oso must help her cheer before the second half of the game ends. Step 1: Watch the cheer Step 2: Practice the cheer Step 3: Do the cheer (15) Titles reference The Spy Who Loved Me
14b	14b	"License to Twirl"	Noelle Wright	May 16, 2009	114b
As Oso sails Wolfie’s boat to a submarine, he receives a special assignment from Pathein. He helps a girl named Ava twirl a hoop-a-loop for the party before her sister Alyssa and friends arrive. Step 1: Find a hoop-a-loop Step 2: Spin the hoop around your waist Step 3: Move your hips to keep the hoop spinning (5) Titles reference Licence to Kill
15a	15a	"For Show and Tell Only"	Brian Swenlin	May 23, 2009	115a
Wolfie assigns Oso to have Rapide the train carry his boat to the sea. Suddenly, a special alert is called after he forgets to couple Rapide to the boat and ends up falling off the boat and uses his pen to grabs onto the boat, leaving him dangling. A boy in Pathein named Grayson needs help, because it is his first show and tell at school and he does not know what to bring yet. It is up to Oso to help him pick something special to show to his classmates and tell them about it. Step 1: Pick something to show Step 2: Show it to your friends Step 3: Tell your friends about it (4) Titles reference For Your Eyes Only
15b	15b	"Piggy Bank Royale"	John Loy	May 23, 2009	115b
Oso is in space practicing flying through a meteor shower when he receives a special alert from Earth. In San Francisco, a girl named Michelle accidentally breaks her brother Eric's piggy bank, and it is up to Oso to help her find the broken piece and glue the piggy bank back together before Eric comes home. Step 1: Find the broken piece Step 2: Put glue on the broken piece Step 3: Glue the pieces together (6) Titles reference Casino Royale
16a	16a	"Hopscotch Royale"	Brian Swenlin	May 30, 2009	116a
While Oso is being trained to hop onto stones across a swamp to bring a tube of sponge animal capsules to the lab, but falls down into the swamp and drains the swamp when the capsules fall and grow into giant sponge animals as he receives a special alert from Paw Pilot. He helps two kids at school named John and Alexis play hopscotch before recess ends. Step 1: Toss the stone into a square Step 2: Hop to the last square Step 3: Hop back and pick up the stone (12) Titles reference Casino Royale
16b	16b	"Goldringer"	John Loy	May 30, 2009	116b
As Oso is trained to fire his laser pen from a hot air balloon for target practice, Paw Pilot calls in a special alert when his balloon gets ripped. He helps a girl named Chloe play horseshoes before her grandpa arrives. Step 1: Point the horseshoe at the wooden stake Step 2: Swing the horseshoe Step 3: Let go of the horseshoe (6) Titles reference Goldfinger
17a	17a	"The Living Flashlight"	Noelle Wright	June 13, 2009	117a
As Oso prepares to launch a deep sea probe, he receives a special alert. He helps two boys named Theo and Oliver replace the batteries in their flashlight for a sleepover campout before it gets dark. Step 1: Find batteries Step 2: Put batteries in the flashlight Step 3: Turn the flashlight on. (7) Titles reference The Living Daylights
17b	17b	"Sandcastle Royale"	Krista Tucker	June 13, 2009	117b
While Oso lumbers through the forest following Agent Wolfie's footprints, a special alert is called. A girl at the beach, named Katie, is going to build a sandcastle as a surprise for her mother, but is not sure yet. It will be up to Oso to help Katie make the sandcastle before her mother finishes reading her book. Step 1: Fill a bucket with wet sand Step 2: Turn the bucket over and lift it up Step 3: Decorate the sandcastle (12) Titles reference Casino Royale
18a	18a	"License to Chill"	Dana Monahan	July 18, 2009	118a
As Oso wears white coveralls to trains to paint his car black, making sure not to touch the wet paint, Paw Pilot calls in a special alert then he gets himself and the inside of Rapide sprayed with paint. He helps a boy in Mumbai named Tyler make his sick twin sister, Lily who has come down with a cold, feel better by making frozen orange juice pops before she takes her medicine. Step 1: Fill an ice cube tray with juice Step 2: Put in toothpicks Step 3: Freeze the juice pops (7) Titles reference Licence to Kill
18b	18b	"GoldenFly"	Noelle Wright	July 18, 2009	118b
One night as Wolfie trains Oso to drive his boat across the water to the dock by following the light of the lighthouse, a special alert is called and he and his boat keep spinning around in circles after trying to follow a duck. A boy in Mombasa named William wants to catch a firefly, but he has trouble doing so. William has ten minutes before he has to go to bed, so it is up to Oso to help William catch a firefly before bedtime. Step 1: Find a firefly Step 2: Put one hand under the firefly Step 3: Gently cover the firefly with your other hand (9) Titles reference GoldenEye
19a	19a	"Tie Another Day"	Krista Tucker	August 24, 2009	119a
As Oso trains a horse, Fargo, to jump over a tall fence and keep him from running off, Paw Pilot calls in a special alert and he flies off from Fargo, landing in a haystack. A girl in Dakar named Tara has new shoes she wants to wear to school. The only problem is that her new shoes are the lace-up kinds, and Tara has never tied shoelaces before, so Oso helps her tie her shoes before the school bus comes to take her to school. Step 1: Cross the laces, wrap one under and pull Step 2: Make a bunny ear Step 3: Wrap the other lace around the bunny ear, push it through and pull (6) Titles reference Die Another Day
19b	19b	"You Only Start Preschool Once"	John Loy	August 24, 2009	119b
Oso is trying to make an eye scanner recognize him by looking directly at it when a special alert is called from Santa Barbara. He shows a boy named Sam, who just started preschool, how to make a new friend before his class goes on a nature walk. Step 1: Say "hi" and introduce yourself Step 2: Ask them their name Step 3: Invite them to play (12) Titles reference You Only Live Twice
20a	20a	"Goldfeather"	Sean Diviny	October 3, 2009	120a
While Wolfie trains Oso in Baffin Island to cross a zip line from one iceberg to another, Oso falls off the zipline into the water and is tossed by three seals and is tossed back to land when a special alert is called in New Jersey. He helps a girl named Brianna, who finds a bird's nest, make a pine cone bird feeder before the birds fly away for the winter. Step 1: Find a pine cone Step 2: Put birdseed on the pine cone Step 3: Hang the pine cone bird feeder (11) Titles reference Goldfinger
20b	20b	"Live and Let Ride"	Noelle Wright	October 3, 2009	120b
Oso is trying to remember a code word to type in so he can blast off into outer space when Paw Pilot calls in a special alert after he types in the incorrect code word and gets his spacesuit inflated. A girl named Emma and her dad want to get to school on time to see Animal Annie, but she and her Dad forget where the bus stop is. So Oso must help them find the bus stop before the bus leaves. Step 1: Find a school bus stop Step 2: Wait for bus number 5 Step 3: Get on the school bus (7) Titles reference Live and Let Die Note: Both episodes were first released as an exclusive bonus feature on the Imagination Movers: Warehouse Mouse Edition DVD on May 5, 2009, five months before they aired on television.
21a	21a	"For Your Pies Only"	Noelle Wright	November 7, 2009	121a
As Oso gets trained in Arizona to race his motorcycle around a track and avoid mud puddles, a special alert is called and he falls into the mud. Two brothers named Carlos and Jose, are buying groceries for their mom for an apple pie. However, neither Carlos nor Jose knows where to find the ingredients on the list. Carlos and Jose only have 20 minutes to shop, and Oso must help them gather the ingredients. Step 1: Find the groceries on the list Step 2: Wait in line Step 3: Pay for the groceries (3) Titles reference For Your Eyes Only
21b	21b	"The Plates are Not Enough"	Brian Swenlin	November 7, 2009	121b
Oso is trained to slide down a mountain in Alaska on his snowboard but he takes the path on the right and crashes on someone's snowman after Paw Pilot calls in a special alert from Newfoundland. Three sisters named Isabella, Allie, and Elizabeth, are preparing a big family dinner. Isabella volunteers to set the table, but she is not good at it yet. Oso helps her out before dinner time. Step 1: Put out the plates Step 2: Place the napkins Step 3: Put out the silverware (8) Titles reference The World Is Not Enough
22a	22a	"For Your Ice Only"	John Loy	December 5, 2009	122a
Dotty trains Oso to walk across a high, narrow beam to test his balance. He takes a fall when Paw Pilot calls in a special alert. A girl named Carina is at her sister Marie's ice skating party, but she is missing all the fun because she has trouble learning how to ice skate. So Oso helps her ice skate before the next conga line begins. Step 1: Stand up without falling Step 2: Move your feet to glide across the ice Step 3: Practice, practice, practice (12) Titles reference For Your Eyes Only
22b	22b	"Coldfingers"	Noelle Wright	December 5, 2009	122b
Oso is out skiing in the Queen Elizabeth Islands, and Dotty trains him to ski down a mountain with falling and without falling. Oso tries remembering on how to keep himself warm when he receives a special alert from Svalbard and Jan Mayen. He helps two kids named Christopher and Ashley build a snowman. They only have ten minutes, and it is up to Oso to help them finish their snowman before they have to go inside and get warm. Step 1: Make three snowballs Step 2: Stack the snowballs on top of each other Step 3: Make a snowman face (8) Titles reference Goldfinger
23a	23a	"Nobody Draws it Better"	Phil Harnage	January 30, 2010	123a
Oso is at the South Pole on a training mission. He tries remembering a special password to enter an ice base. When Oso says the word "up", he gets tossed into a snowbank, then a special alert is called. In Krasnodar, Oso helps a girl named Anna make a new Valentine's Day card for her dad, when her dog, Mitzi, accidentally ripped the old card up before her dad wakes up. Step 1: Fold the paper Step 2: Decorate the card Step 3: Help Anna write her name on the card (12) Titles reference "Nobody Does It Better," which was not the name of a Bond film, but instead the name of the theme song to The Spy Who Loved Me
23b	23b	"Thunderbubble"	Brian Swenlin	January 30, 2010	123b
Oso is trained to transport Wolfie's boat into the lake. Oso tries filling the passageway with water when a special alert is called, and the water overflows. He helps a boy in São Luís named Andrew blow bubbles for his grandparents' 50th wedding anniversary dance, before the band begins playing for the anniversary dance. Step 1: Make bubble mix Step 2: Dip the bubble wand Step 3: Blow into the circle on the wand (9) Titles reference Thunderball
24a	24a	"Recycling is Forever"	John Loy	April 17, 2010	124a
Wolfie trains Oso to ride his motorcycle across the lake. Oso fails to step on the pedal, presses the red turbo button, and lands his motorbike in a pine tree, causing Paw Pilot to call in a special alert from Palu. Oso helps a boy named Joshua recycle the bottles, cans, and paper, as part of Joshua's family household chores, so that Joshua and his family can go out for some yogurt before the shop closes. Step 1: Find the things to be recycled Step 2: Sort the cans, bottles, and paper Step 3: Put them in the correct bins (7) Titles reference Diamonds Are Forever
24b	24b	"Goldswinger"	John Loy	April 17, 2010	124b
Oso is in space being trained by Dotty to go from the cargo hole of the space jet to the cockpit. He tries to figure out how to get there the fastest when a special alert comes in from San Francisco. A girl named Natalie is at the playground with her Aunt Susan and her little brother Noah. Natalie wants her aunt to push her on the swings, but her aunt must watch Noah as he plays in the sandbox. Oso decides to help Natalie swing before they have to go home. Step 1: Hold onto the chains Step 2: Walk backward Step 3: Hop on the seat and pump your legs (8) Titles reference Goldfinger: This is the first season finale in airing order.
