= Poor Mary =

Nursery rhyme

Nursery rhyme
- Published: 1880s

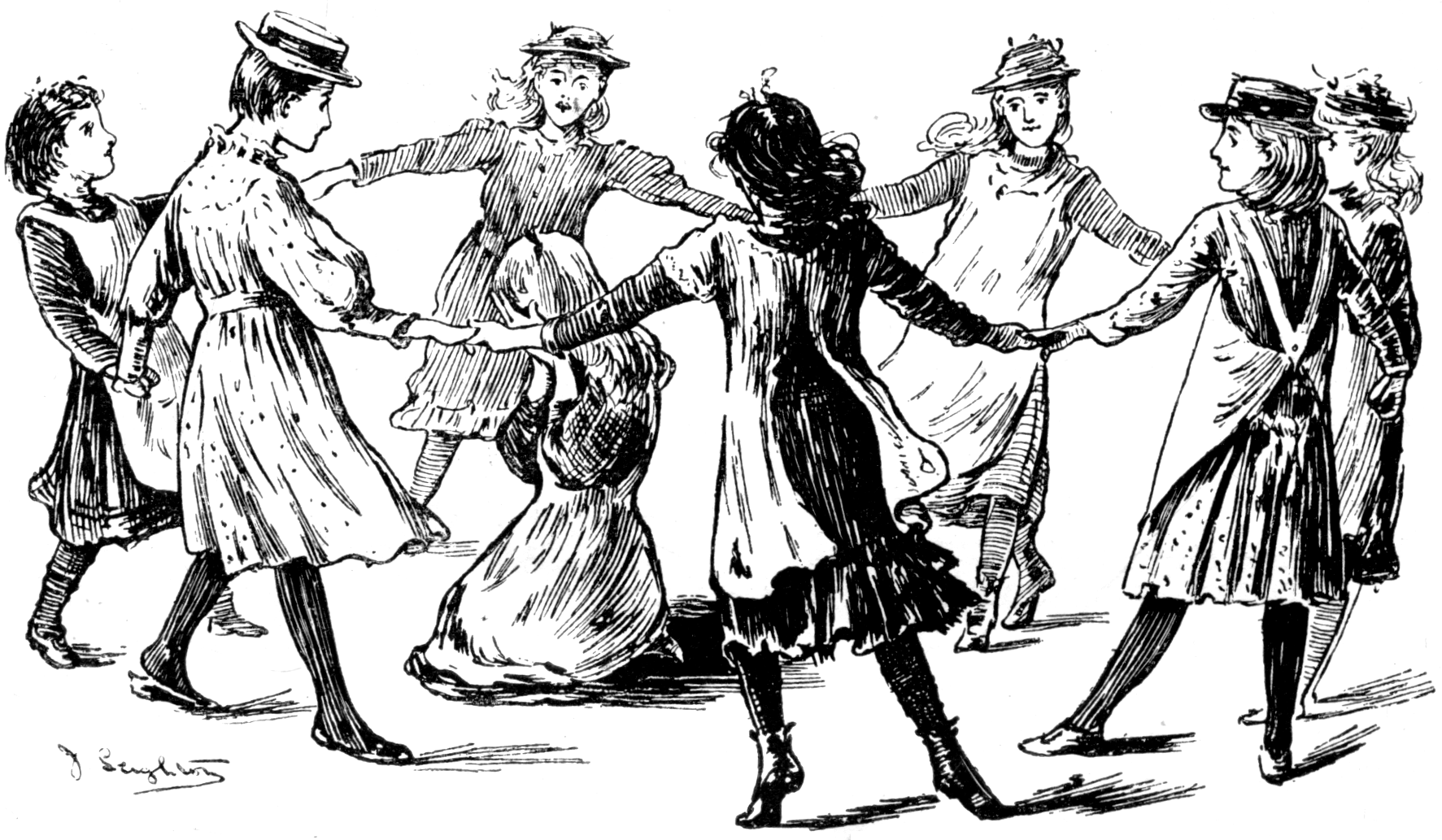

"Poor Mary" or "Poor Jenny" is an English language nursery rhyme and singing game. It has a Roud Folk Song Index number of 1377.

== Lyrics ==
Lyrics vary considerably for this song. Over a hundred known variations have been collected in Britain since the 1880s, not least in the use of the names, including Jenny, Mary and Sally. Common modern versions include:

Poor Jenny is a-weeping,
A-weeping, a-weeping,
Poor Jenny is a-weeping
On a bright summer’s day.

Why are you weeping,
Weeping, weeping,
Why are you weeping,
On a bright summer's day?

I'm weeping for a loved one,
A loved one, a loved one,
I'm weeping for a loved one,
On a bright summer's day.

Stand up and choose your loved one,
Your loved one, your loved one,
Stand up and choose your loved one,
One a bright summer's day.

Shake hands before you leave 'er,
You leave 'er, you leave 'er,
Shake hands before you leave 'er,
On a bright summer's day.

== The game ==
One child of the group is chosen to be "Jenny" or "Mary" etc., and has to kneel in the middle of a circle, usually with head in hands. The other children join their hands and walk around the other child singing the first verse. The child in the centre then carries out the actions of the following verses, most importantly choosing a partner.

== The tune ==
The tune is widely known in Europe, and forms the first section of the folk dance tune "La Bourrée des Galvachers" from Burgundy, France. The melody was also used by Dmitri Shostakovich in his first Piano Concerto, op.35.

== See also ==
- Kagome Kagome
