= Mother may I? =

Children's game

Mother may I? is a children's game, also known as "captain may I?" and "father may I?".

== Objective, rules, and general gameplay ==
One player plays the "mother", "father" or "captain". The other players are the "children" or "crewmembers". To begin the game, the mother or father stands at one end of the room and turns around facing away, while the children line up at the other end. The children take turns asking, "mother/father, may I ____?" and makes a movement suggestion. For example, one might ask, "Mother/Father, may I take five steps forward?" The mother/father either replies "Yes, you may" or "No, you may not do that, but you may _____ instead" and inserts their own suggestion. The players usually move closer to the mother/father, but are sometimes led astray. Even if the mother/father makes an unfavorable suggestion, the child must still perform it. The first of the children to reach the location of the mother/father wins the game. That child becomes the mother/father, and the original mother/father becomes a child. A new round will then commence.

Some suggestions that fill in the "mother/father/captain, may I ____?" blank include:

- Take (#) steps forward
- Take (#) giant steps forward (usually a small number, due to large step size)
- Take (#) baby steps forward (usually a large number, due to tiny step size)
- Take (#) umbrella steps forward
- Hop forward like a frog, (#) times
- Run forward for (#) seconds
- Crabwalk forward for (#) seconds
- Take (#) Cinderella steps - twirl forward with index finger touching the top of the head
- Open-and-shut the book (#) times - jump forwards with feet apart then again bringing the feet together
- Lamppost - lie face down and stretch arms forwards, bring your feet to the point reached by the fingertips

If the "children" are reaching the "mother" or "father" too quickly, the "mother"/"father" may reject the child's suggestion by replacing it with "No, you may not do that, but you may ____ instead." They may reduce the child's original suggestion (for example, reducing five giant steps to three giant steps), or make a different suggestion, such as:

- Take (#) steps backward
- Run backward for (#) seconds
- Walk backward until I (mother/father) say "stop"
- Return to the starting line (in rare cases)

A common alternative gameplay is for "mother" or "father" (who can be facing the children) to begin each child's turn by issuing the instruction to be carried out. The child must reply, "Mother/Father, may I?" before carrying out the order, to which Mother/Father always consents. However, if the child omits to ask permission, he or she is required to go back to the start. Children who have advanced a long way towards the goal are thus brought to ruin; instructions to go backwards must also be asked for lest a worse fate awaits. The art to being a good mother or father is to bring everyone as equally as possible.

Other variations of this kind of crossing-over game are "what's the time, Mr. Wolf?" (sometimes called "old Mrs. Fox, what time is it?", although this version is slightly different), "grandmother's footsteps" and "bulldog", played in Britain. In the first of these, gameplay is similar: Mr Wolf faces away from the children (or Mrs. Fox faces the children), the children together chant in a well-known fashion "what's the time, Mr Wolf?" (or "old Mrs. Fox, what time is it?"), and if he or she replies with 9 o'clock, the children move 9 steps forward. Should anyone reach Mr. Wolf, he or she becomes the new Mr Wolf. Alternatively, however, should Mr. Wolf reply to the question by saying "dinner time!" (or in the Mrs. Fox version, "midnight!") he turns and chases the children back towards the start. If he catches one before he or she reaches safety, that child is the new Mr. Wolf.

== References in fiction ==
- Mother Mae-Eye is the name of a villain from the Teen Titans animated series.
- "Mother May I" is a track by Coheed and Cambria that features on their 2005 album, Good Apollo, I'm Burning Star IV, Volume One: From Fear Through the Eyes of Madness.
- In the first season of Barney & Friends, the episode "Down on Barney's Farm" featured Barney and the kids playing the game while waiting for another farm animal to show up.
- A Sesame Street sketch had Luis and a group of kids playing "May I?" until Oscar the Grouch showed up and suggested a similar game, the difference being instead of "may I?" the players ask "do I have to??"
- In The Poisonwood Bible, Ruth May befriends a group of local children by teaching them the game.
- In the 2017 film I Love You, Daddy, multiple characters describe a naked adult version of the game that teens play on spring break.

== References in nonfiction ==
- Some sources say "mother, may I?" was the inspiration for Neil Armstrong's famous words when setting foot on the Moon ("That's one small step for [a] man [...]"). In the Discovery and Science Channel's 2019 documentary, Apollo: The Forgotten Films, Kotcho Solacoff, listed as "Neil Armstrong's close friend", said that when he asked Armstrong about the source of his words, Armstrong stated on the way to the Moon, he was thinking about the game, in which you take small steps and giant steps to reach the goal. No other source reports this explanation directly from Armstrong, but his brother speculated that the game was Armstrong's inspiration.

== See also ==
- Red light, green light
- Simon says
